= Electoral history of Mike Huckabee =

Electoral history of Mike Huckabee, Republican politician and 44th governor of Arkansas.

1992 United States Senate election in Arkansas (Republican Primary)
Party	Candidate	Votes	%
Republican	Mike Huckabee	41,406	79.16
Republican	David Busby	10,902	20.84

1992 United States Senate election in Arkansas
Party	Candidate	Votes	%
Democratic	Dale Bumpers (incumbent)	553,635	60.18
Republican	Mike Huckabee	366,373	39.82

1993 Arkansas lieutenant gubernatorial special election
Party	Candidate	Votes	%
Republican	Mike Huckabee	151,502	50.85
Democratic	Nate Coulter	146,436	49.15

1994 Arkansas lieutenant gubernatorial election
Party	Candidate	Votes	%
Republican	Mike Huckabee (incumbent)	417,191	58.58
Democratic	Charlie Cole Chaffin	294,957	41.42

1998 Arkansas gubernatorial election (Republican Primary)
Party	Candidate	Votes	%
Republican	Mike Huckabee (incumbent)	51,627	90.24
Republican	Gene McVay	5,581	9.76

1998 Arkansas gubernatorial election
Party	Candidate	Votes	%
Republican	Mike Huckabee (incumbent)	421,989	59.77
Democratic	Bill Bristow	272,923	38.66
Reform	Keith Carle	11,099	1.57

2002 Arkansas gubernatorial election (Republican Primary)
Party	Candidate	Votes	%
Republican	Mike Huckabee (incumbent)	78,803	85.44
Republican	Doyle Cannady	13,434	14.57

2002 Arkansas gubernatorial election
Party	Candidate	Votes	%
Republican	Mike Huckabee (incumbent)	427,082	53.01
Democratic	Jimmie Lou Fisher	378,250	46.95

== Presidential elections ==
=== 2008 ===
First place by popular vote and plurality of delegates John McCain (37) Mitt Romney (11) Mike Huckabee (8)

2008 Republican Party presidential primaries
Party	Candidate	Votes	%
Republican	John McCain	9,840,746	47.25
Republican	Mitt Romney	4,525,036	21.73
Republican	Mike Huckabee	4,179,514	20.07
Republican	Ron Paul	1,163,078	5.58
Republican	Rudy Giuliani	591,384	2.84
Republican	Fred Thompson	273,806	1.31
Republican	uncommitted	91,504	0.44
Republican	Alan Keyes	58,251	0.28
Republican	Duncan Hunter	38,011	0.18
Republican	Tom Tancredo	8,513	0.04
Republican	John H. Cox	3,341	0.02
Republican	Sam Brownback	2,838	0.01

2008 Republican National Convention
Party	Candidate	Votes	%
Republican	John McCain	1,455	66.2
Republican	Mike Huckabee	270	12.3
Republican	Mitt Romney	189	8.6
Republican	Ron Paul	35	1.6
Republican	Fred Thompson	11	0.5
Republican	Alan Keyes	2	0.1
Republican	Duncan Hunter	1	<0.1

=== 2016 ===
Huckabee got 51,450 or (0.16%) of the vote during the 2016 Republican Party presidential primaries.
