= 2008 United States presidential election in Kansas =

- November 4, 2008

Nominee	John McCain	Barack Obama
Party	Republican	Democratic
Home state	Arizona	Illinois
Running mate	Sarah Palin	Joe Biden
Electoral vote	6	0
Popular vote	699,655	514,765
Percentage	56.48%	41.55%

McCain
40–50%
50–60%
60–70%
70–80%
80–90%
90–100%
Obama
40–50%
50–60%
60–70%
70–80%
80–90%
90–100%
President before election
George W. Bush
Republican
Elected President
Barack Obama
Democratic

The 2008 United States presidential election in Kansas took place on November 4, 2008, and was part of the 2008 United States presidential election. Voters chose six representatives, or electors to the Electoral College, who voted for president and vice president.

Kansas was won by Republican nominee John McCain by a 14.9% margin of victory. Prior to the election, all 17 news organizations considered this a state McCain would win, or otherwise considered as a safe red state. He won all but three counties and one congressional district in the state. Obama still performed significantly better than Kerry, and his 41.55% of the vote remains the highest for a Democrat in the 21st century, although his running mate Joe Biden nearly matched that percentage 12 years later, with a slight reduction in margin of defeat.

As of 2024, this is the last time that Crawford County voted for the Democratic candidate in a presidential election.

== Caucuses ==
- 2008 Kansas Democratic presidential caucuses
- 2008 Kansas Republican presidential caucuses

== Campaign ==
=== Predictions ===
There were 16 news organizations who made state-by-state predictions of the election. Here are their last predictions before election day:

Source	Ranking
D.C. Political Report	Likely R
Cook Political Report	Solid R
The Takeaway	Solid R
Electoral-vote.com	Solid R
Washington Post	Solid R
Politico	Solid R
RealClearPolitics	Solid R
FiveThirtyEight	Solid R
CQ Politics	Solid R
The New York Times	Solid R
CNN	Safe R
NPR	Solid R
MSNBC	Solid R
Fox News	Likely R
Associated Press	Likely R
Rasmussen Reports	Safe R

=== Polling ===
McCain won every pre-election poll. Since March 16, McCain won each poll with a double-digit margin and at least 47% of the vote.

=== Fundraising ===
John McCain raised a total of $1,219,074 in the state. Barack Obama raised $1,548,322.

=== Advertising and visits ===
Obama spent $62,108. McCain and his interest groups spent $13,693. Neither campaign visited the state.

== Analysis ==
Kansas has always been a Republican stronghold at the presidential level, voting for GOP nominees in all but seven elections since statehood. The last Democratic presidential nominee to carry Kansas was Lyndon B. Johnson in his landslide in 1964. Although the state did receive attention from Barack Obama, whose mother was born in Kansas, it wasn't enough to overcome the deeply planted GOP roots in the state. John McCain carried Kansas by a comfortable 15-percent margin of victory. McCain's margin of victory in Kansas, however, was less than that of George W. Bush who carried the state in 2004 with 62% of the vote over John Kerry's 36.62% showing in the state - a 10-point swing to the Democrats in 2008.

Obama only won three counties - Crawford (home to Pittsburg), Douglas (home to Lawrence), and Wyandotte (home to Kansas City). The first two were home to large college populations, while Wyandotte had a significant African-American population. He did, however, succeed in winning 41% of the state's popular vote. The other Democrats to have cracked the 40 percent barrier in the state since Johnson's 1964 landslide are Jimmy Carter in 1976, Michael Dukakis in 1988, Joe Biden in 2020, and Kamala Harris in 2024.

To highlight its status as a reliably red state, former State Treasurer Lynn Jenkins, a Republican, ousted incumbent Democratic U.S. Representative Nancy Boyda to win back Kansas's 2nd Congressional District seat in the U.S. House of Representatives. Jenkins received 50.80% of the vote to Boyda's 45.97%. At the same time, incumbent Republican U.S. Senator Pat Roberts was reelected with 60.06% of the vote over former Democratic U.S. Representative Jim Slattery. Republicans also made gains in the Kansas Senate, picking up one seat.

As of the 2024 presidential election, this is the last election in which Crawford County voted for the Democratic candidate. Obama became the first Democrat to win the White House without carrying Atchison County since John F. Kennedy in 1960.

== Results ==
2008 United States presidential election in Kansas
Party	Candidate	Running mate	Votes	Percentage	Electoral votes
Republican	John McCain	Sarah Palin	699,655	56.48%	6
Democratic	Barack Obama	Joe Biden	514,765	41.55%	0
Independent	Ralph Nader	Matt Gonzalez	10,527	0.85%	0
Libertarian	Bob Barr	Wayne Allyn Root	6,706	0.54%	0
Reform	Chuck Baldwin	Darrell Castle	4,148	0.33%	0
Green	Cynthia McKinney (write-in)	Rosa Clemente	35	0.00%	0
Write-in votes			36	0.00%	0
Totals			1,238,873	100.00%	6
Voter turnout (Voting age population)					60.8%

=== By county ===
County	John McCain Republican		Barack Obama Democratic		Ralph Nader Independent		Bob Barr Libertarian		Various candidates Other parties		Margin		Total votes cast
County	#	%	#	%	#	%	#	%	#	%	#	%	Total votes cast
Allen	3,552	60.67%	2,189	37.39%	67	1.14%	30	0.51%	17	0.29%	1,363	23.28%	5,855
Anderson	2,362	65.14%	1,175	32.40%	50	1.38%	24	0.66%	15	0.41%	1,187	32.74%	3,626
Atchison	3,791	52.72%	3,241	45.07%	99	1.38%	37	0.51%	23	0.32%	550	7.65%	7,191
Barber	1,833	74.45%	598	24.29%	14	0.57%	9	0.37%	8	0.32%	1,235	50.16%	2,462
Barton	7,802	70.56%	3,027	27.38%	142	1.28%	52	0.47%	34	0.31%	4,775	43.18%	11,057
Bourbon	4,240	62.53%	2,394	35.30%	80	1.18%	32	0.47%	35	0.52%	1,846	27.23%	6,781
Brown	2,985	68.21%	1,317	30.10%	42	0.96%	16	0.37%	16	0.37%	1,668	38.11%	4,376
Butler	18,155	65.13%	9,159	32.86%	253	0.91%	170	0.61%	136	0.49%	8,996	32.27%	27,873
Chase	976	70.52%	383	27.67%	12	0.87%	9	0.65%	4	0.29%	593	42.85%	1,384
Chautauqua	1,418	76.57%	401	21.65%	17	0.92%	8	0.43%	8	0.43%	1,017	54.92%	1,852
Cherokee	5,886	60.90%	3,594	37.19%	118	1.22%	45	0.47%	22	0.23%	2,292	23.71%	9,665
Cheyenne	1,148	76.64%	323	21.56%	13	0.87%	7	0.47%	7	0.47%	825	55.08%	1,498
Clark	897	77.39%	245	21.14%	6	0.52%	2	0.17%	9	0.78%	652	56.25%	1,159
Clay	2,998	73.95%	1,009	24.89%	28	0.69%	13	0.32%	6	0.15%	1,989	49.06%	4,054
Cloud	3,121	70.12%	1,233	27.70%	51	1.15%	26	0.58%	20	0.45%	1,888	42.42%	4,451
Coffey	3,054	72.16%	1,121	26.49%	28	0.66%	19	0.45%	10	0.24%	1,933	45.67%	4,232
Comanche	765	78.54%	194	19.92%	12	1.23%	1	0.10%	2	0.21%	571	58.62%	974
Cowley	8,492	61.59%	5,012	36.35%	162	1.18%	72	0.52%	49	0.36%	3,480	25.24%	13,787
Crawford	7,735	48.12%	7,957	49.50%	227	1.41%	94	0.58%	62	0.39%	-222	-1.38%	16,075
Decatur	1,189	76.81%	343	22.16%	9	0.58%	3	0.19%	4	0.26%	846	54.65%	1,548
Dickinson	6,081	70.16%	2,422	27.95%	75	0.87%	60	0.69%	29	0.33%	3,659	42.21%	8,667
Doniphan	2,372	66.55%	1,115	31.29%	32	0.90%	25	0.70%	20	0.56%	1,257	35.26%	3,564
Douglas	17,929	33.42%	34,398	64.13%	622	1.16%	307	0.57%	385	0.71%	-16,469	-30.71%	53,641
Edwards	995	73.32%	333	24.54%	15	1.11%	12	0.88%	2	0.15%	662	48.78%	1,357
Elk	1,042	72.66%	363	25.31%	10	0.70%	15	1.05%	4	0.28%	679	47.35%	1,434
Ellis	8,207	65.94%	4,010	32.22%	128	1.03%	63	0.51%	39	0.31%	4,197	33.72%	12,447
Ellsworth	2,021	68.79%	851	28.97%	39	1.33%	18	0.61%	9	0.31%	1,170	39.82%	2,938
Finney	6,926	66.89%	3,275	31.63%	78	0.75%	48	0.46%	27	0.26%	3,651	35.26%	10,354
Ford	5,730	64.64%	2,991	33.74%	57	0.64%	56	0.63%	30	0.34%	2,739	30.90%	8,864
Franklin	7,079	60.04%	4,433	37.60%	121	1.03%	66	0.56%	92	0.78%	2,646	22.44%	11,791
Geary	4,492	55.50%	3,491	43.13%	68	0.84%	23	0.28%	20	0.25%	1,001	12.37%	8,094
Gove	1,136	80.11%	261	18.41%	10	0.71%	3	0.21%	8	0.56%	875	61.70%	1,418
Graham	1,060	74.49%	325	22.84%	27	1.90%	7	0.49%	4	0.28%	735	51.65%	1,423
Grant	1,995	74.97%	635	23.86%	12	0.45%	9	0.34%	10	0.38%	1,360	51.11%	2,661
Gray	1,643	77.54%	436	20.58%	18	0.85%	15	0.71%	7	0.33%	1,207	56.96%	2,119
Greeley	591	79.33%	151	20.27%	2	0.27%	1	0.13%	0	0.00%	440	59.06%	745
Greenwood	1,619	71.04%	622	27.29%	16	0.70%	14	0.61%	8	0.35%	997	43.75%	2,279
Hamilton	844	77.01%	233	21.26%	7	0.64%	8	0.73%	4	0.36%	611	55.75%	1,096
Harper	1,999	71.49%	736	26.32%	35	1.25%	15	0.54%	11	0.39%	1,263	45.17%	2,796
Harvey	9,006	57.40%	6,318	40.27%	165	1.05%	77	0.49%	125	0.80%	2,688	17.13%	15,691
Haskell	1,277	81.34%	278	17.71%	8	0.51%	4	0.25%	3	0.19%	999	63.63%	1,570
Hodgeman	865	78.92%	211	19.25%	9	0.82%	6	0.55%	5	0.46%	654	59.67%	1,096
Jackson	3,811	60.95%	2,308	36.91%	83	1.33%	29	0.46%	22	0.35%	1,503	24.04%	6,253
Jefferson	5,220	58.32%	3,542	39.58%	118	1.32%	54	0.60%	16	0.18%	1,678	18.74%	8,950
Jewell	1,231	77.71%	313	19.76%	22	1.39%	10	0.63%	8	0.51%	918	57.95%	1,584
Johnson	152,627	53.70%	127,091	44.72%	1,469	0.52%	1,540	0.54%	1,484	0.52%	25,536	8.98%	284,211
Kearny	1,159	78.21%	309	20.85%	10	0.67%	3	0.20%	1	0.07%	850	57.36%	1,482
Kingman	2,603	71.04%	963	26.28%	40	1.09%	35	0.96%	23	0.63%	1,640	44.76%	3,664
Kiowa	912	80.35%	200	17.62%	16	1.41%	5	0.44%	2	0.18%	712	62.73%	1,135
Labette	5,001	55.38%	3,839	42.51%	89	0.99%	56	0.62%	46	0.51%	1,162	12.87%	9,031
Lane	814	79.26%	193	18.79%	8	0.78%	9	0.88%	3	0.29%	621	60.47%	1,027
Leavenworth	16,791	54.89%	13,255	43.33%	263	0.86%	162	0.53%	120	0.39%	3,536	11.56%	30,591
Lincoln	1,204	75.91%	347	21.88%	22	1.39%	6	0.38%	7	0.44%	857	54.03%	1,586
Linn	3,086	66.84%	1,425	30.86%	57	1.23%	29	0.63%	20	0.43%	1,661	35.98%	4,617
Logan	1,187	82.43%	225	15.63%	18	1.25%	5	0.35%	5	0.35%	962	66.80%	1,440
Lyon	6,698	51.88%	5,924	45.88%	169	1.31%	68	0.53%	52	0.40%	774	6.00%	12,911
Marion	4,159	68.64%	1,801	29.72%	59	0.97%	23	0.38%	17	0.28%	2,358	38.92%	6,059
Marshall	3,157	62.69%	1,784	35.42%	54	1.07%	26	0.52%	15	0.30%	1,373	27.27%	5,036
McPherson	8,937	66.76%	4,218	31.51%	107	0.80%	70	0.52%	54	0.40%	4,719	35.25%	13,386
Meade	1,540	79.75%	357	18.49%	14	0.73%	12	0.62%	8	0.41%	1,183	61.26%	1,931
Miami	9,382	61.01%	5,742	37.34%	116	0.75%	68	0.44%	69	0.45%	3,640	23.67%	15,377
Mitchell	2,440	76.18%	701	21.89%	34	1.06%	16	0.50%	12	0.37%	1,739	54.29%	3,203
Montgomery	9,309	66.94%	4,338	31.19%	145	1.04%	70	0.50%	45	0.32%	4,971	35.75%	13,907
Morris	1,875	66.00%	907	31.93%	28	0.99%	16	0.56%	15	0.53%	968	34.07%	2,841
Morton	1,153	82.24%	229	16.33%	8	0.57%	11	0.78%	1	0.07%	924	65.91%	1,402
Nemaha	3,817	71.23%	1,432	26.72%	67	1.25%	20	0.37%	23	0.43%	2,385	44.51%	5,359
Neosho	4,473	62.19%	2,563	35.64%	95	1.32%	31	0.43%	30	0.42%	1,910	26.55%	7,192
Ness	1,207	79.15%	289	18.95%	21	1.38%	5	0.33%	3	0.20%	918	60.20%	1,525
Norton	1,878	77.76%	497	20.58%	23	0.95%	13	0.54%	4	0.17%	1,381	57.18%	2,415
Osage	4,820	63.89%	2,534	33.59%	96	1.27%	59	0.78%	35	0.46%	2,286	30.30%	7,544
Osborne	1,490	77.20%	403	20.88%	26	1.35%	7	0.36%	4	0.21%	1,087	56.32%	1,930
Ottawa	2,323	75.28%	704	22.81%	28	0.91%	18	0.58%	13	0.42%	1,619	52.47%	3,086
Pawnee	1,946	67.59%	882	30.64%	39	1.35%	6	0.21%	6	0.21%	1,064	36.95%	2,879
Phillips	2,105	78.93%	525	19.69%	29	1.09%	5	0.19%	3	0.11%	1,580	59.24%	2,667
Pottawatomie	6,929	70.15%	2,599	26.31%	79	0.80%	50	0.51%	220	2.22%	4,330	43.84%	9,877
Pratt	2,822	67.35%	1,294	30.88%	40	0.95%	24	0.57%	10	0.24%	1,528	36.47%	4,190
Rawlins	1,247	80.50%	273	17.62%	14	0.90%	8	0.52%	7	0.45%	974	62.88%	1,549
Reno	16,112	60.57%	9,916	37.28%	232	0.87%	136	0.51%	206	0.78%	6,196	23.29%	26,602
Republic	1,978	74.05%	640	23.96%	27	1.01%	15	0.56%	11	0.41%	1,338	50.09%	2,671
Rice	2,780	69.14%	1,163	28.92%	44	1.09%	23	0.57%	11	0.27%	1,617	40.22%	4,021
Riley	12,111	52.43%	10,495	45.43%	186	0.81%	148	0.64%	160	0.70%	1,616	7.00%	23,100
Rooks	2,068	79.91%	468	18.08%	31	1.20%	11	0.43%	10	0.39%	1,600	61.83%	2,588
Rush	1,225	68.78%	504	28.30%	29	1.63%	12	0.67%	11	0.62%	721	40.48%	1,781
Russell	2,509	76.19%	736	22.35%	23	0.70%	14	0.43%	11	0.33%	1,773	53.84%	3,293
Saline	14,165	62.16%	8,186	35.92%	187	0.82%	184	0.81%	66	0.29%	5,979	26.24%	22,788
Scott	1,823	83.66%	321	14.73%	19	0.87%	7	0.32%	9	0.41%	1,502	68.93%	2,179
Sedgwick	106,849	55.15%	82,337	42.50%	1,589	0.82%	1,231	0.64%	1,724	0.89%	24,512	12.65%	193,730
Seward	3,791	71.05%	1,493	27.98%	15	0.28%	24	0.45%	13	0.24%	2,298	43.07%	5,336
Shawnee	41,476	49.05%	41,235	48.77%	823	0.97%	418	0.49%	598	0.70%	241	0.28%	84,550
Sheridan	1,108	80.52%	254	18.46%	11	0.80%	2	0.15%	1	0.07%	854	62.06%	1,376
Sherman	1,959	72.45%	688	25.44%	30	1.11%	16	0.59%	11	0.41%	1,271	47.01%	2,704
Smith	1,719	77.78%	446	20.18%	23	1.04%	10	0.45%	12	0.54%	1,273	57.60%	2,210
Stafford	1,495	72.08%	542	26.13%	21	1.01%	8	0.39%	8	0.39%	953	45.95%	2,074
Stanton	628	75.94%	188	22.73%	6	0.73%	3	0.36%	2	0.24%	440	53.21%	827
Stevens	1,815	85.33%	283	13.31%	9	0.42%	11	0.52%	9	0.42%	1,532	72.02%	2,127
Sumner	6,737	65.17%	3,353	32.44%	124	1.20%	74	0.72%	49	0.47%	3,384	32.73%	10,337
Thomas	2,837	77.24%	787	21.43%	29	0.79%	9	0.25%	11	0.30%	2,050	55.81%	3,673
Trego	1,225	73.31%	420	25.13%	18	1.08%	2	0.12%	6	0.36%	805	48.18%	1,671
Wabaunsee	2,395	68.02%	1,036	29.42%	36	1.02%	14	0.40%	40	1.14%	1,359	38.60%	3,521
Wallace	690	85.82%	96	11.94%	8	1.00%	5	0.62%	5	0.62%	594	73.88%	804
Washington	2,248	75.44%	659	22.11%	30	1.01%	20	0.67%	23	0.77%	1,589	53.33%	2,980
Wichita	840	82.43%	163	16.00%	8	0.79%	3	0.29%	5	0.49%	677	66.43%	1,019
Wilson	2,850	69.16%	1,170	28.39%	49	1.19%	20	0.49%	32	0.78%	1,680	40.77%	4,121
Woodson	1,055	65.98%	512	32.02%	21	1.31%	6	0.38%	5	0.31%	543	33.96%	1,599
Wyandotte	16,506	28.75%	39,865	69.44%	409	0.71%	190	0.33%	439	0.76%	-23,359	-40.69%	57,409
Totals	699,655	56.48%	514,765	41.55%	10,527	0.85%	6,706	0.54%	7,220	0.58%	184,890	14.93%	1,238,873

Counties that flipped from Republican to Democratic

- Crawford (largest city: Pittsburg)

=== By congressional district ===
McCain carried three of the state's four congressional districts.

District	McCain	Obama	Representative
1st	68.60%	29.61%	Jerry Moran
2nd	54.87%	43.20%	Nancy Boyda (110th Congress)
2nd	54.87%	43.20%	Lynn Jenkins (111th Congress)
3rd	48.01%	50.59%	Dennis Moore
4th	58.38%	39.72%	Todd Tiahrt

== Electors ==
Technically the voters of Kansas cast their ballots for electors: representatives to the Electoral College. Kansas is allocated 6 electors because it has 4 congressional districts and 2 senators. All candidates who appear on the ballot or qualify to receive write-in votes must submit a list of 6 electors, who pledge to vote for their candidate and their running mate. Whoever wins the majority of votes in the state is awarded all 6 electoral votes. Their chosen electors then vote for president and vice president. Although electors are pledged to their candidate and running mate, they are not obligated to vote for them. An elector who votes for someone other than their candidate is known as a faithless elector.

The electors of each state and the District of Columbia met on December 15, 2008, to cast their votes for president and vice president. The Electoral College itself never meets as one body. Instead the electors from each state and the District of Columbia met in their respective capitols.

The following were the members of the Electoral College from the state. All 6 were pledged to John McCain and Sarah Palin:

1. Tom Arpke
2. Jeff Colyer
3. David Kensinger
4. Kris Kobach
5. Mike Pompeo
6. Helen Van Etten

== See also ==
- United States presidential elections in Kansas
- Presidency of Barack Obama
