= Senator Chafin =

Senator Chafin may refer to:

- Ben Chafin (born 1960), Virginia State Senate
- Truman Chafin (born 1945), West Virginia State Senate

== See also ==
- Charlie Cole Chaffin (born 1938), Arkansas State Senate
