= 1994 Arkansas lieutenant gubernatorial election =

- November 8, 1994
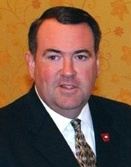

Nominee	Mike Huckabee	Charlie Cole Chaffin
Party	Republican	Democratic
Popular vote	417,191	294,957
Percentage	58.58%	41.42%
- County results Huckabee: 50–60% 60–70% 70–80% Chaffin: 50–60%
Lieutenant Governor before election
Mike Huckabee
Republican
Elected Lieutenant Governor
Mike Huckabee
Republican

The 1994 Arkansas lieutenant gubernatorial election was held on November 8, 1994, to elect the lieutenant governor of Arkansas. Republican incumbent Mike Huckabee, first elected in a special election in 1993, won election to a full term by a wide margin of seventeen percentage points over Democratic challenger and Arkansas state senator Charlie Cole Chaffin.

== General election ==
=== Candidates ===
- Mike Huckabee, incumbent lieutenant governor of Arkansas (1993–1996) (Republican)
- Charlie Cole Chaffin, Arkansas state senator (1984–1994) (Democratic)

=== Results ===
1994 Arkansas lieutenant gubernatorial election results
Party	Candidate	Votes	%	±%
Republican	Mike Huckabee	417,191	58.58%	+7.73%
Democratic	Charlie Cole Chaffin	294,957	41.42%	−7.73%
Total votes		712,148	100.00%	
Republican hold				
