= Public image of Mike Huckabee =

The public image of former Governor and Republican presidential candidate Mike Huckabee is mixed. He has been criticized by many conservatives such as Rush Limbaugh. He received significant support in his 2008 presidential campaign, including endorsements from five Representatives of the U.S. House, three former governors and seven newspapers.

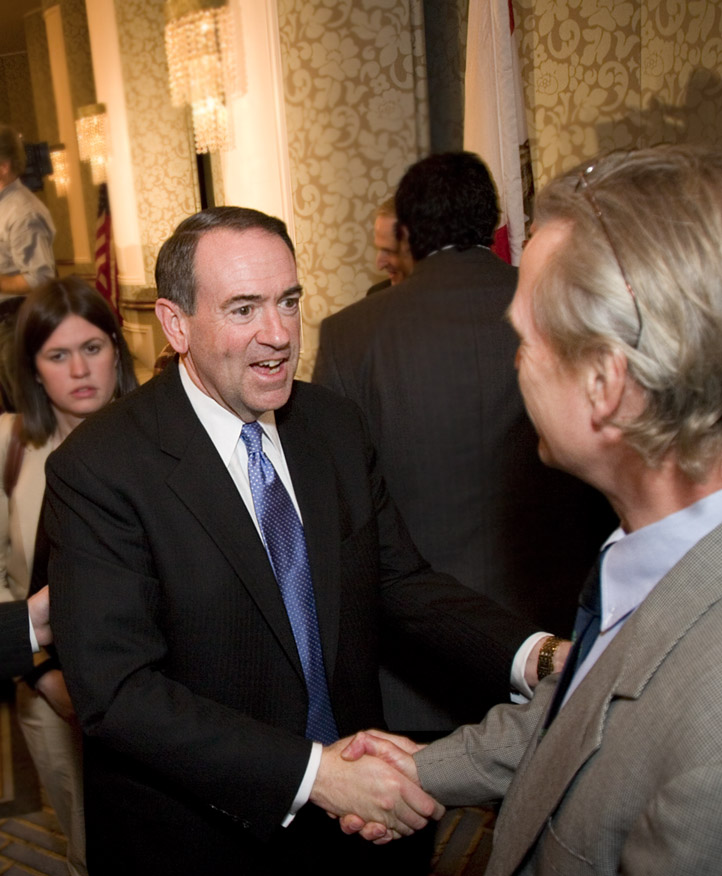
Mike Huckabee greeting an attendee after an address at the San Francisco Commonwealth Club, Jan. 31, 2008.

== Ideology ==
=== Fiscal ===
In late 1996, Huckabee campaigned for ballot Amendment 1, a plan to adjust property tax rules to make school funding more equal across the state, and Amendment 2, a constitutional amendment increasing the state sales tax 0.125 percent to improve the state's park system and natural resources. Later in 2001, his refusal to raise taxes in the face of a budget shortfall sparked criticism from lawmakers and the media.

The conservative non-profit group Club for Growth spent hundreds of thousands of dollars during 2008 presidential race attacking Huckabee's economic policies. The group argued that Huckabee increased state spending 65.3 percent (1996–2004) and supported five tax increases. In response, Huckabee said he doubled the standard deduction and the child care tax credit, eliminated the marriage penalty and the capital gains tax on the sale of a home, and reduced the capital gains tax for both businesses and individuals. Ernest Dumas of the Arkansas Times, a consistent Huckabee critic, responded that most of the tax cuts were small deductions and exemptions initiated by the state legislature, the broad-based tax cut was proposed by his predecessor and Huckabee was "the biggest taxer and spender in Arkansas history." The Club for Growth pointed out that Huckabee publicly opposed the repeal of a sales tax on groceries and medicine in 2002, signed a bill raising taxes on gasoline in 1999, and signed a $5.25 bed-tax on private nursing home patients in 2001. Arkansas Health Care Association President Jim Cooper stated the private nursing home tax was necessary in order to avert future huge tax increases as a result of years of mismanagement. The libertarian think tank, the Cato Institute gave Huckabee an "F" for his spending/tax policies as governor in 2006 and a D for his career as governor. Former Arkansas State Representative Randy Minton (R) said Huckabee's "support for taxes split the Republican Party, and damaged our name brand." The Arkansas Department of Finance and Administration reported that during Huckabee's tenure, taxes decreased ninety times for a reduction of $378 million, while taxes were raised twenty-one times for an increase of $883 million.

In 2005, Time magazine named him one of the five best governors in the U.S., writing "Huckabee has approached his state's troubles with energy and innovation". The newspaper of Dallas Morning News endorsed Huckabee in 2008 and praised his fiscal policies as governor saying "Mr. Huckabee established a respectable record of fiscal responsibility in Arkansas. Rather than run up deficits, he backed raising taxes to pay for needed infrastructure, health care and education. That's called prudence, and it was once a Republican virtue."

=== Social ===
The Christian Science Monitor called Huckabee a "conservative with a social gospel." because he "speaks the language of Christian Evangelicals on social issues" but as governor opened himself up to criticism that he was not consistently conservative on taxing and spending on education and healthcare. Bill O'Reilly's first question to Huckabee in an interview was "Is Mike Huckabee ‘Too Religious’ to be elected president?"

== Personality ==
Huckabee's personality has been described in positive terms as "gentle and warm", "charming", "friendly, teddy-bear", and "engaging, warm, relaxed, and persuasive". Huckabee's personality has been described in negative terms as "petty, thin-skinned, self-righteous", and "somewhat vindictive". Mixed descriptions include "best of leaders and the worst of thin-skinned pols" and "charming and aloof".

== Perception from liberals and Democrats ==
On December 9, 2007, liberal columnist Frank Rich of The New York Times praised Huckabee in an op-ed saying Huckabee is the Republicans' Obama.

On December 11, 2007, the conservative news website Drudge Report, stated in an "exclusive" report that the highest levels of the Democratic Party told their officials to avoid any criticism of 2008 Republican presidential contender Mike Huckabee, until he would secure the nomination. One Democrat said "He'll easily be their McGovern, an easy kill."

== Support from minority groups ==
On January 21, 2008, Mike Huckabee received the endorsement of 50 African-American leaders in Atlanta, Georgia. The endorsers cited Huckabee's record on life, education, minorities, the economy, the prison system, and immigration as Arkansas governor.

== Criticism from gay rights groups ==
Huckabee has expressed on numerous occasions a particularly low opinion of the LGBT community. Kathy Webb, a gay Arkansas state senator, has said the "former governor doesn't seem to have a lot of tolerance and goodwill toward gay people."

Huckabee has also been criticized for being photographed with Brian Camenker the head of MassResistance, a social conservative activist group that has been classified as a "hate group" by the Southern Poverty Law Center, a legal advocacy organization known for its tolerance education programs and legal victories against white supremacists. When told Brian was from MassResistance, Huckabee said, "I know. I get your emails."

Andrew Sullivan is frequently critical of Huckabee, especially his comments that HIV-positive people should be isolated, calling such comments against gays with HIV "rancid homophobia". The family of Ryan White, an Indiana teenager who died of AIDS, has also objected to Huckabee's comments about AIDS.

Jay Barth, the co-author of a book on Arkansas politics, has been quoted as saying "In terms of public comments that are clearly derogatory toward gays and lesbians or persons with HIV/AIDS, most of those comments come early in his career," and "That is not to say he became a progressive on the issue, but he talked about them less."

In July 2012, after Chick-fil-A COO Dan Cathy made several public statements supporting what he believes to be "the traditional family," saying about same-sex marriage that those who "have the audacity to define what marriage is about" were "inviting God's judgment on our nation". Several prominent politicians expressed disapproval. Boston Mayor Thomas Menino, and Chicago Alderman Proco "Joe" Moreno said they hoped to block franchise expansion into their areas. The proposed bans drew criticism from liberal pundits, legal experts, and the American Civil Liberties Union. The Jim Henson Company, which had a Pajanimals kids' meal toy licensing arrangement with Chick-fil-A, said it would cease its business relationship, and donate the payment to the Gay & Lesbian Alliance Against Defamation. Chick-fil-A stopped distributing the toys, citing unrelated safety concerns that had arisen prior to the controversy. In response to criticism of the Cathy family's support for "traditional In response to criticism of the Cathy family's support for "traditional marriage,". Politician Mike Huckabee created the counter-protest for August 1 called "Chick-fil-A Appreciation Day."

== Controversial statements ==
Over the years, Huckabee admitted to making public statements have drawn criticism. Commenting on another incident comparing Arkansas journalists critical of his policies with disgraced reporters Jayson Blair and Janet Cooke, Huckabee said "You'll see it – one of the things that gets me in trouble is my love of metaphors. I use hyperbole in the course of trying to paint a word picture. I pay a dear price for it."

=== American Muslims ===
In February 2011, Huckabee questioned the decision of two Protestant churches that allowed Muslims to use their facilities for worship, remarking that Islam "is the antithesis of the Gospel of Christ". In May 2014, Huckabee invited on his Fox News program Islamic feminists Raquel Saraswati and Raheel Raza to discuss the kidnapping of Nigerian schoolgirls by Nigerian Islamist group Boko Haram. During the show Huckabee acknowledged that "not all Muslims want to kill anyone who is not a Muslim", and that knowing so was "refreshing".

=== Concentration camp ===
After a 100-pound weight loss he quipped, "I have just come out of six weeks at a concentration camp held by the Democrat Party of Arkansas in an undisclosed location". The National Jewish Democratic Council chastised him for what it regarded as a Holocaust reference. Huckabee denied referencing the Holocaust or slighting Jews.

=== Suicide ===
Suicide awareness groups criticized Huckabee for mentioning suicide while joking about the fundraising efforts of his primary opponents. He responded "I would never intentionally hurt the feelings of anyone for any reason, and I certainly was not making light of suicide, but of the excesses of campaign spending".

=== Mormons ===
He also asked "Don't Mormons believe that Jesus and the devil are brothers?" when discussing Mitt Romney's religion. Huckabee apologized to Romney and explained, "I asked the question because I had heard that," but "never thought it would make the story."

=== Abortion holocaust ===
October 2007, Huckabee labeled the "liberalized abortion" of "more than a million people" who would have joined the workforce since Roe v. Wade a "holocaust". The Anti-Defamation League called on Huckabee and all candidates to resist using such "disturbing and offensive" terms.

=== Canadian igloo ===
While governor of Arkansas he was asked by host Rick Mercer of the Canadian satiric comedy news show This Hour Has 22 Minutes about Canada's decision to preserve its national igloo. Unaware to the fact that Canada has no national igloo, Mike Huckabee congratulated Canada for preserving it. In a subsequent interview Rick Mercer explained that Huckabee had asked if it was a controversial igloo but that he wasn't aware that it was a fake news story.

=== Illegal immigrants ===
In December 2007, Huckabee said that Pakistan has more illegal immigrants entering the United States than any country but Mexico. Department of Homeland Security estimated that more illegal immigrants entered the U.S. from Korea, Philippines, China and Vietnam than from Pakistan.

=== Marriage ===
In January 2008, in an interview with the website Beliefnet, Huckabee said "I think the radical view is to say that we're going to change the definition of marriage so that it can mean two men, two women, a man and three women, a man and a child, a man and animal."

=== Amending constitution ===
At a Michigan primary campaign appearance on January 14, 2008, Huckabee said "I have opponents in this race who do not want to change the Constitution. But I believe it's a lot easier to change the Constitution than it would be to change the word of the living God. And that's what we need to do – to amend the Constitution so it's in God's standards rather than try to change God's standards so it lines up with some contemporary view."

=== Israel ===
In 2009, Huckabee criticized American policy toward Israel in front of an Israeli audience. These comments drew accusations from liberal bloggers that Huckabee was "bashing America", which he denied. Huckabee responded that President Obama's policies were "anti-Israel and promise breaking", stating, “I have extolled the virtues of the USA at every stop and in every comment, but have stated a position that I have stated for many years — during both Republican and Democratic administrations — that Jerusalem should be a united city.”

=== WikiLeaks ===
On November 29, 2010, Huckabee strongly criticized WikiLeaks and its sources in relation to the Cablegate scandal in which approximately 251,000 U.S. Embassy cables were obtained by WikiLeaks and displayed on its website. Much of the information released was labeled secret and confidential. Huckabee was quoted saying, "Whoever in our government leaked that information is guilty of treason," and "anything less than execution is too kind a penalty."

== See also ==
- Arkansas gubernatorial election, 2006
- Who Made Huckabee?
- The Huckabee Report
