= 1998 Arkansas gubernatorial election =

- November 3, 1998
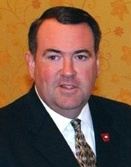

| Nominee | Mike Huckabee | Bill Bristow |
| Party | Republican | Democratic |
| Popular vote | 421,989 | 272,923 |
| Percentage | 59.77% | 38.66% |
- County results Huckabee: 40–50% 50–60% 60–70% 70–80% Bristow: 50–60%
Governor before election
Mike Huckabee
Republican
Elected Governor
Mike Huckabee
Republican

The 1998 Arkansas gubernatorial election took place on November 3, 1998 to elect the governor of Arkansas. Republican incumbent Mike Huckabee was re-elected to a second term in office over Democratic nominee Bill Bristow.

== Background ==
In 1993, Mike Huckabee won a special election to become lieutenant governor of Arkansas after Jim Guy Tucker was elevated to governor following the resignation of Bill Clinton. Tucker resigned from office in 1996 after his conviction for arranging fraudulent loans as part of the Whitewater controversy, and Huckabee became governor of Arkansas on July 15, 1996.

== Republican primary ==
=== Candidates ===
- Mike Huckabee, incumbent governor of Arkansas since 1996
- Gene McVay, Air National Guard colonel

=== Results ===
Republican Primary results
| Party | Candidate | Votes | % |
|---|---|---|---|
| Republican | Mike Huckabee (inc.) | 64,819 | 63.56 |
| Republican | Gene McVay | 37,160 | 36.44 |
| Total votes | | 101,979 | 100.00 |

== Democratic primary ==
=== Candidates ===
- Dirk Anderson, farmer
- Bill Bristow, attorney
- Johnny Hoyt, state representative

=== Results ===
Democratic Party primary results
| Party | Candidate | Votes | % |
|---|---|---|---|
| Democratic | Bill Bristow | 129,639 | 55.22 |
| Democratic | Johnny Hoyt | 90,057 | 38.36 |
| Democratic | Dirk Anderson | 15,072 | 6.42 |
| Total votes | | 234,769 | 100.00 |

== General election ==
=== Candidates ===
- Bill Bristow, attorney (Democratic)
- Keith Carle (Reform)
- Mike Huckabee, incumbent governor of Arkansas since 1996 (Republican)

=== Campaign ===
Because Huckabee had not yet been elected to the post, and the aftermath of Tucker's resignation had temporarily tarnished the title of governor, he was expected to face a strong challenge from Bristow. However, Huckabee's appeal as an honest Southern Baptist minister in the wake of scandal and Bristow's lack of political experience made Huckabee a much more attractive candidate. He ran a well-funded grassroots campaign across all portions of the state, while the Democratic Party focused on Blanche Lincoln's campaign for U.S. Senate.

=== Polling ===
| Poll source | Date(s) administered | Sample size (Note: Key: A – all adults RV – registered voters LV – likely voters V – unclear) | Margin of error | Mike Huckabee (R) | Bill Bristow (D) | Keith Carle (Rf) | Undecided |
|---|---|---|---|---|---|---|---|
| Mason-Dixon Polling & Strategy | October 23–25, 1998 | 810 (LV) | ± 3.5% | 58% | 33% | – | 9% |
| Mason-Dixon Polling & Strategy | October 5–7, 1998 | 838 (LV) | ± 3.5% | 60% | 30% | – | 10% |
| Mason-Dixon Polling & Strategy | September 8–9, 1998 | 811 (LV) | ± 3.5% | 61% | 31% | 1% | 7% |
| McLaughlin Consulting Group | July 14–20, 1998 | 400 (LV) | ± 4.9% | 69% | 22% | 1% | 8% |
| Mason-Dixon Polling & Strategy | June 1–3, 1998 | 805 (RV) | ± 3.5% | 62% | 28% | 1% | 9% |
| Mason-Dixon Polling & Strategy | May 11–12, 1998 | 814 (LV) | ± 3.5% | 61% | 27% | – | 12% |

=== Results ===
On election day, Huckabee won the election with nearly 60 percent of the vote, the largest margin for any Republican governor of Arkansas since Reconstruction. It would not be surpassed until 2018, when Asa Hutchinson received 65.3 percent.

According to a CNN exit poll, Huckabee received 48 percent of the African American vote. During Huckabee's 2008 presidential campaign, some experts questioned whether those numbers were a representative sample.

Arkansas gubernatorial election, 1998
| Party | Candidate | Votes | % | ±% |
|---|---|---|---|---|
| Republican | Mike Huckabee (inc.) | 421,989 | 59.77% | +19.61% |
| Democratic | Bill Bristow | 272,923 | 38.66% | −21.18% |
| Reform | Keith Carle | 11,099 | 1.57% | |
| Majority | | 149,066 | 19.54% | +0.14% |
| Turnout | | 706,011 | | |
| Republican hold | | Swing | | |
