= 1993 Arkansas lieutenant gubernatorial special election =

- July 27, 1993
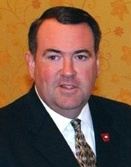

Nominee	Mike Huckabee	Nate Coulter
Party	Republican	Democratic
Popular vote	151,502	146,436
Percentage	50.85%	49.15%
- County results Huckabee: 50–60% 60–70% Coulter: 50–60% 60–70%
Lieutenant Governor before election
Vacant
Elected Lieutenant Governor
Mike Huckabee
Republican

The 1993 Arkansas lieutenant gubernatorial special election was held on July 27, 1993 to fill the office of lieutenant governor of Arkansas, which became vacant following incumbent Jim Guy Tucker's elevation to the governorship after Bill Clinton resigned to take office after winning the 1992 United States presidential election. Republican pastor and the party's unsuccessful 1992 nominee for U.S. Senate in Arkansas Mike Huckabee won the election in an upset, defeating Democratic attorney Nate Coulter by one percentage point.

With his victory, Huckabee became just the second Republican lieutenant governor of Arkansas since Reconstruction.

== General election ==
=== Candidates ===
- Mike Huckabee, pastor and 1992 Republican nominee for U.S. Senate in Arkansas (Republican)
- Nate Coulter, attorney and former legal counsel to Governor Bill Clinton (Democratic)

=== Results ===
1993 Arkansas lieutenant gubernatorial special election results
Party	Candidate	Votes	%
Republican	Mike Huckabee	151,502	50.85%
Democratic	Nate Coulter	146,436	49.15%
Total votes		297,938	100.00%
Republican gain from Democratic			
