= 2008 Kansas Democratic presidential caucuses =

- February 5, 2008

Candidate	Barack Obama	Hillary Clinton
Home state	Illinois	New York
Delegate count	23	9
Popular vote	27,172	9,462
Percentage	73.98%	25.76%
- Congressional district results

The 2008 Kansas Democratic presidential caucuses took held on Super Tuesday, February 5, 2008, with 21 delegates at stake. The remaining 11 delegates were selected at the Kansas Democratic Party District Conventions on April 12. The state, and a majority of its delegates, were won by Barack Obama.

== Process ==
The Kansas Democratic Caucus was open to all registered Democrats, non-Democrats, 17-year-olds eligible to vote by the general election, and new voters who could register or re-register at the door. Surrogates were permitted for religious observance, military service, legislative service, or physical disability. At the caucus, participants gathered into preference groups. There was a 15-percent minimum threshold required for viability at the precinct level, with re-caucusing among all participants permitted. After re-caucusing, the results were tallied and reported to state party headquarters, and delegates were selected to Congressional District Conventions on April 12, who then selected delegates to the Kansas Democratic Party State Convention on May 17. In Kansas, delegates' pledges are binding to congressional districts at the precinct level, unlike most other caucuses, where delegates are unpledged up to the Congressional District Convention level.

== Results ==
=== Local Unit Convention Results ===
Convention Date: February 5, 2008

National Pledged Delegates Determined: 21 (of 32)

Kansas Democratic Presidential Caucus Results – 2008
Party	Candidate	Votes	Percentage	Delegates
Democratic	Barack Obama	27,172	73.98%	23
Democratic	Hillary Clinton	9,462	25.76%	9
Democratic	John Edwards	53	0.14%	0
Democratic	Dennis Kucinich	35	0.10%	0
Democratic	Bill Richardson	1	0.00%	0
Totals		36,723	100.00%	32
Voter turnout		%		—

=== District Convention Results ===
Allocation of delegates to candidates was pre-determined by the results of the local unit conventions on February 5. Only the persons filling the roles of delegates and alternates were chosen at this event.

Convention Date: April 12, 2008

National Pledged Delegates Determined: 0 (of 32)

Kansas Democratic Presidential District Convention Results – 2008
Party	Candidate	District Delegates	Percentage	National Delegates
Democratic	Barack Obama	15	71.43%	23
Democratic	Hillary Clinton	6	28.57%	9
Totals		21	100.00%	32
Voter turnout		%		—

=== State Convention Results ===
Convention Date: May 17, 2008

== Analysis ==
As he did throughout all other states that held caucuses, Barack Obama defeated Hillary Rodham Clinton by a nearly three-to-one margin in Kansas, one of the reddest states in the nation. Obama, however, had roots in Kansas, as it was the state where his mother was born and raised. Obama also received a huge endorsement from former Governor Kathleen Sebelius who was at the time a very popular Democratic Governor in a very Republican state. The endorsement by Sebelius, who went on to serve as Secretary of Health & Human Services in the Obama Administration, along with Obama's roots in the state, may have contributed to his large victory in the Kansas Democratic Primary. He won a majority of counties and carried all four of the state's congressional districts. Clinton only carried three counties in the state - Franklin, Linn and Miami (both Miami and Linn are situated along the state's border with Missouri where Clinton did far better). Clinton also tied Obama in 16 counties but these were relatively rural and far less populated areas that could not be overweighed by his margins in the more populated, urban areas including Kansas City, Lawrence, Topeka, and Wichita.

== See also ==
- 2008 Democratic Party presidential primaries
- 2008 Kansas Republican presidential caucuses
