= 2008 Kansas Republican presidential caucuses =

- February 9, 2008

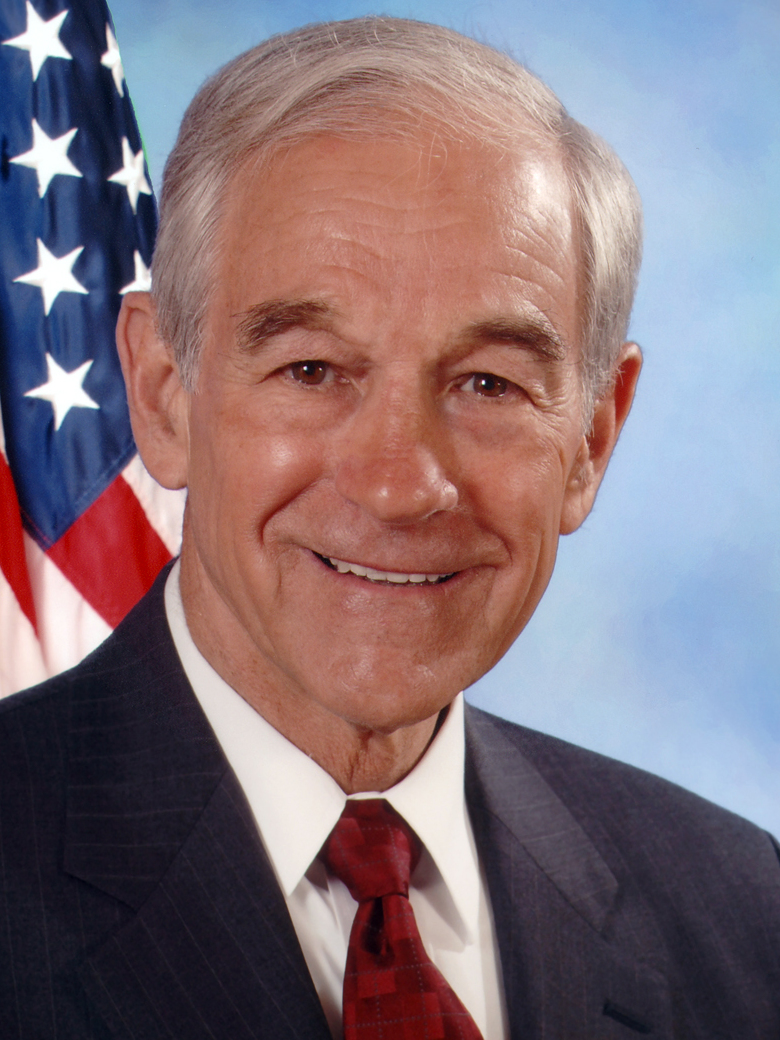
Candidate	Mike Huckabee	John McCain
Home state	Arkansas	Arizona
Delegate count	36	0
Popular vote	11,627	4,587
Percentage	59.58%	23.50%
Candidate	Ron Paul
Home state	Texas
Delegate count	0
Popular vote	2,182
Percentage	11.18%
- Congressional district results Mike Huckabee

The 2008 Kansas Republican presidential caucuses were held on February 9, 2008, as part of the selection process for delegates to the 2008 Republican National Convention.

Mike Huckabee, former governor of Arkansas, won the caucuses with 59.58% of the vote, securing all 36 of Kansas's national delegates. His victory was confirmed by major news outlets, including Fox News, CNN, and the Associated Press.

John McCain, the national frontrunner at the time, finished second with 23.50% of the vote, while Ron Paul placed third with 11.18%.

== Results ==
Official Results
Candidate	Votes	Percentage	Delegates
Mike Huckabee	11,627	59.58%	36
John McCain	4,587	23.50%	0
Ron Paul	2,182	11.18%	0
Mitt Romney	653	3.35%	0
Alan Keyes	288	1.48%	0
Fred Thompson	61	0.31%	0
Rudy Giuliani	34	0.17%	0
Uncommitted	84	0.43%	0
Total	19,133	100%	36

There were also 528 provisional ballots cast.

== See also ==
- 2008 Kansas Democratic presidential caucuses
- 2008 Republican Party presidential primaries
