= 2002 Arkansas gubernatorial election =

- November 5, 2002
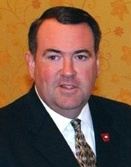

Nominee	Mike Huckabee	Jimmie Lou Fisher
Party	Republican	Democratic
Popular vote	427,082	378,250
Percentage	53.02%	46.96%
- County results Huckabee: 50–60% 60–70% Fisher: 50–60% 60–70%
Governor before election
Mike Huckabee
Republican
Elected Governor
Mike Huckabee
Republican

The 2002 Arkansas gubernatorial election took place on November 5, 2002, for the post of Governor of Arkansas. Incumbent Republican governor Mike Huckabee defeated Democratic State Treasurer Jimmie Lou Fisher to win a second full term in office, despite losing 26 counties he won in 1998. This is the last gubernatorial election in Arkansas decided by a single-digit margin.

== Democratic primary ==
=== Candidates ===
- Jimmie Lou Fisher, Arkansas State Treasurer
- Joe Holmes, former prosecutor
- Jim Billie

=== Results ===
Democratic primary results by county Fisher: 40–50%; 50–60%; 60–70%; 70–80%; 80–90%; Holmes: 50–60%; 60–70%

Democratic Party primary results
Party	Candidate	Votes	%
Democratic	Jimmie Lou Fisher	176,126	63.11
Democratic	Joe Holmes	77,516	27.77
Democratic	Jim Billie	25,455	9.12
Total votes		279,097	100.00

== Republican primary ==
=== Candidates ===
- Mike Huckabee, incumbent governor of Arkansas
- Doyle Cannady, retired banker

=== Results ===
Republican Primary results
Party	Candidate	Votes	%
Republican	Mike Huckabee (incumbent)	78,803	85.44
Republican	Doyle Cannady	13,434	14.56
Total votes		92,237	100.00

== General election ==
=== Campaign ===
At the start of the election campaign Huckabee was expected to win the election easily with a poll in July showing him 16% ahead. Fisher began the campaign by unveiling plans on issues such as prescription drugs, education and domestic violence. She also attacked Huckabee for mismanagement and likened him to a dictator for his response to criticism over cost overruns in a new computer system.

Huckabee's record as governor became an issue in the election with Fisher's campaign attacking Huckabee for granting clemency to violent criminals, including a rapist. However Huckabee responded that he had signed more death warrants and executed more people than any other governor of Arkansas. Huckabee called on voters to support him due to the progress in education, health care and the economy during his period as governor. Huckabee also criticised Fisher for receiving help from former governor Bill Clinton, describing him as having had his turn.

Huckabee's lead in the polls declined as the election neared, with a poll in September showing him with a 12% lead and one in mid-October showing him 10% ahead. Near the end of October a poll showed Huckabee only 2% ahead of Fisher. Huckabee's campaign was hurt by his wife's struggling campaign to become Arkansas secretary of state; voters were concerned over the couple holding too much power, with polls showing Janet Huckabee over 20% behind. In late October a fundraising letter from Huckabee's campaign described it as in crisis. Huckabee was also sued by his daughter Sarah in his role as governor in a lawsuit he wanted to lose. This came after a state court ordered that students should be removed from the voting rolls in Arkadelphia. Huckabee suggested his daughter join a federal lawsuit which succeeded in getting the students restored.

=== Predictions ===
Source	Ranking	As of
The Cook Political Report	Tossup	October 31, 2002
Sabato's Crystal Ball	Lean R	November 4, 2002

=== Results ===
Arkansas gubernatorial election, 2002
Party	Candidate	Votes	%	±%
Republican	Mike Huckabee (incumbent)	427,082	53.02%	−6.75%
Democratic	Jimmie Lou Fisher	378,250	46.96%	+8.30%
Write-in		210	0.03%	N/A
Majority		48,832	6.06%	−15.05%
Turnout		805,542	100.00%	N/A
Republican hold				

==== Counties that flipped from Republican to Democratic ====
- Arkansas (Largest city: Stuttgart)
- Ashley (Largest city: Crossett)
- Bradley (largest city: Warren)
- Clark (largest city: Arkadelphia)
- Conway (Largest city: Morrilton)
- Craighead (Largest city: Jonesboro)
- Crittenden (Largest city: West Memphis)
- Dallas (Largest city: Fordyce)
- Desha (largest city: Dumas)
- Fulton (Largest city: Salem)
- Greene (Largest city: Paragould)
- Hempstead (largest city: Hope)
- Hot Spring (Largest city: Malvern)
- Izard (Largest city: Horseshoe Bend)
- Jefferson (largest city: Pine Bluff)
- Lafayette (Largest city: Stamps)
- Lincoln (largest city: Star City)
- Little River (largest city: Ashdown)
- Monroe (largest city: Clarendon)
- Mississippi (largest city: Osceola)
- Nevada (Largest city: Prescott)
- Ouachita (Largest city: Camden)
- Phillips (largest city: Helena-West Helena)
- Poinsett (largest city: Harrisburg)
- Pulaski (largest city: Little Rock)
- Sevier (Largest city: De Queen)
