= 1992 United States Senate election in Arkansas =

- November 3, 1992
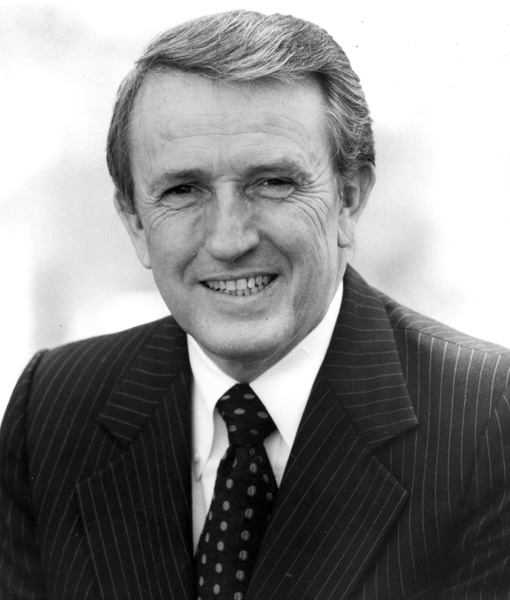

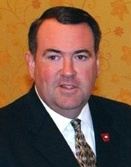
Nominee	Dale Bumpers	Mike Huckabee
Party	Democratic	Republican
Popular vote	553,635	366,373
Percentage	60.18%	39.82%
- County results Bumpers: 50–60% 60–70% 70–80% 80–90% Huckabee: 50–60%
U.S. senator before election
Dale Bumpers
Democratic
Elected U.S. Senator
Dale Bumpers
Democratic

The 1992 United States Senate election in Arkansas was held on November 3, 1992. Incumbent Democratic Senator Dale Bumpers won re-election to a fourth term. His Republican opponent was future Arkansas lieutenant governor, governor, and two-time presidential candidate Mike Huckabee, a church pastor from Texarkana.

The 1992 election coincided with the 1992 presidential election, in which Arkansas governor Bill Clinton, who was elected as President of the United States, won his home state. While Bumpers had previously won his home state with over 60% of the vote, Clinton secured only 53.21% of the vote. Bumpers served another term in the Senate before retiring in 1998.

== Democratic primary ==
=== Candidates ===
- Dale Bumpers, incumbent U.S. Senator and former Governor
- Julia Hughes Jones, State Auditor

=== Results ===
Democratic Primary for U.S. Senate, 1992
Party	Candidate	Votes	%
Democratic	Dale Bumpers (incumbent)	325,054	64.5%
Democratic	Julia Hughes Jones	178,843	35.5%
Total votes		503,897	100.0%

== Republican primary ==
=== Candidates ===
- Mike Huckabee, pastor
- David Busby, businessman

=== Results ===
Republican Primary for U.S. Senate, 1992
Party	Candidate	Votes	%
Republican	Mike Huckabee	41,346	79.1%
Republican	David Busby	10,892	20.9%
Total votes		52,238	100.0%

== General election ==
=== Results ===
Arkansas Senate election 1992
Party	Candidate	Votes	%
Democratic	Dale Bumpers (incumbent)	553,635	60.18%
Republican	Mike Huckabee	366,373	39.82%
Total votes		920,008	100.00%
Democratic hold			

== See also ==
- 1992 United States Senate elections
- 2002 United States Senate election in Arkansas
- 2008 United States Senate election in Arkansas
