= Mike Huckabee =

American politician and diplomat (born 1955)

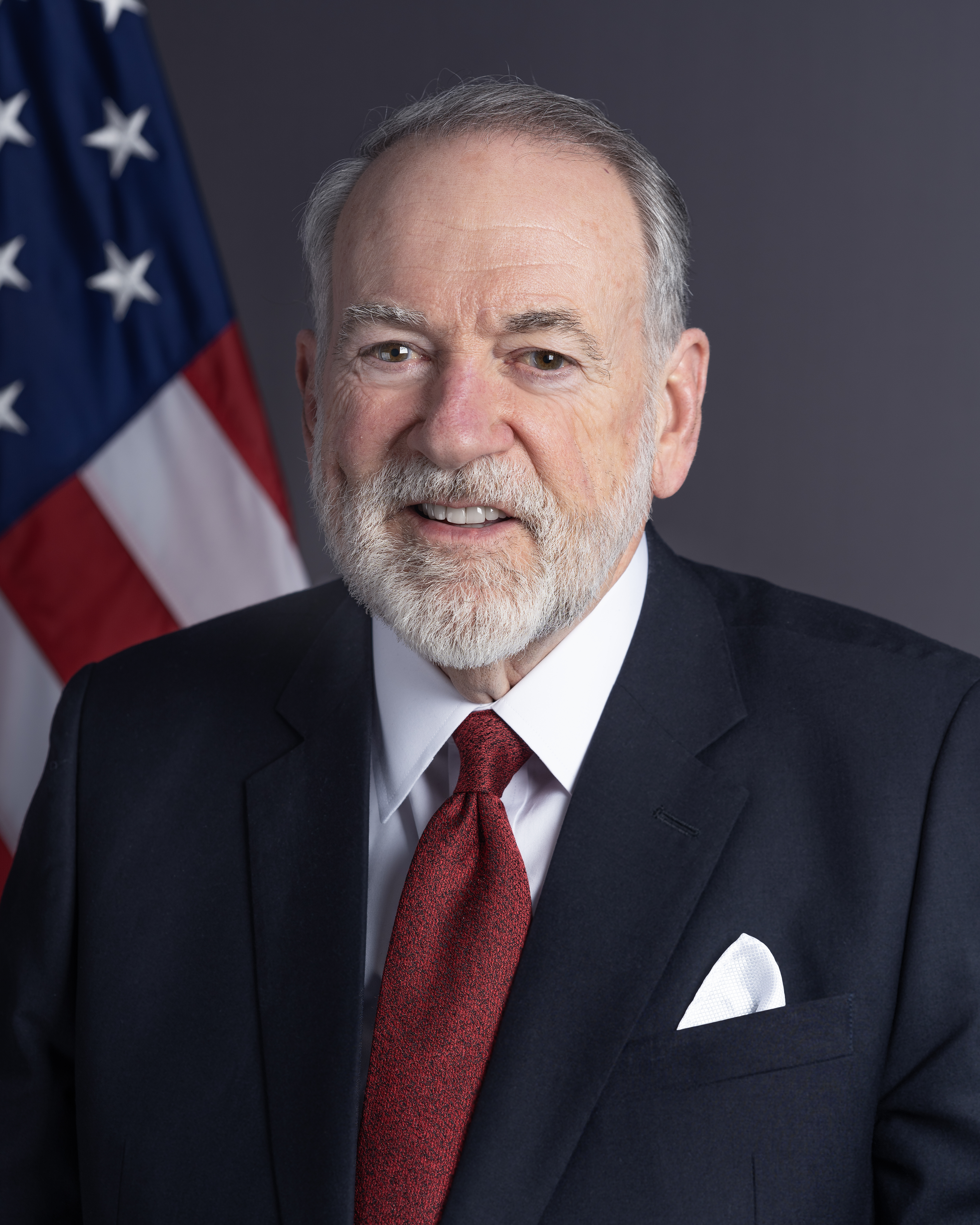
- Official portrait, 2025

29th United States Ambassador to Israel
- Incumbent
- Assumed office April 21, 2025
- President: Donald Trump
- Preceded by: Jack Lew

44th Governor of Arkansas
- In office July 15, 1996 – January 9, 2007
- Lieutenant: Winthrop Paul Rockefeller (1996–2006); Vacant (2006–07)
- Preceded by: Jim Guy Tucker
- Succeeded by: Mike Beebe

Chair of the National Governors Association
- In office July 18, 2005 – August 7, 2006
- Preceded by: Mark Warner
- Succeeded by: Janet Napolitano

16th Lieutenant Governor of Arkansas
- In office November 20, 1993 – July 15, 1996
- Governor: Jim Guy Tucker
- Preceded by: Jim Guy Tucker
- Succeeded by: Winthrop Paul Rockefeller

Personal details
- Born: Michael Dale Huckabee; August 24, 1955 (age 71) Hope, Arkansas, U.S.
- Party: Republican
- Spouse: Janet McCain (m. 1974)
- Children: 3, including Sarah
- Education: Ouachita Baptist University (BA); Southwestern Baptist Theological Seminary (attended)
- Website: Official website

Michael Dale Huckabee (/ˈhʌkəbi/, born August 24, 1955) is an American politician, diplomat, and Baptist minister serving as the 29th United States ambassador to Israel since 2025. A member of the Republican Party, he served as the 44th governor of Arkansas from 1996 to 2007, and ran for his party's presidential nomination in both 2008 and 2016. He is the father of Sarah Huckabee Sanders, the current governor of Arkansas since 2023 and a former White House press secretary.

Huckabee was the host of the talk show Huckabee, which ran on Fox News from 2008 to 2015, and on TBN from October 2017 to January 2025. From April 2012 through December 2013, he also hosted a daily radio program, The Mike Huckabee Show, on weekday afternoons for Cumulus Media Networks. Huckabee is an ordained Southern Baptist pastor noted for his evangelical views, a musician, and a public speaker. He has written several books and was previously a political commentator on The Huckabee Report.

In the 2008 Republican presidential primaries, Huckabee won the 2008 Iowa Republican caucuses and finished second in delegate count and third in both popular vote and number of states won, behind John McCain and Mitt Romney. Huckabee ran again for the Republican nomination in the 2016 presidential election but withdrew early in the primary following the Iowa caucus. On November 12, 2024, it was announced that then–President-elect Donald Trump would be nominating Huckabee as US ambassador to Israel. He was sworn in on April 9, 2025, and presented his credentials to Israeli president Isaac Herzog on April 21.

== Early life ==
Huckabee was born on August 24, 1955, in Hope, Arkansas, the son of Dorsey Wiles Huckabee (1923–1996) and his wife Mae (Elder) Huckabee (1925–1999), conservative Southern Democrats. Huckabee is of English, German, and Scots-Irish ancestry, with roots in America dating to the Colonial Era. He has cited his working-class upbringing as the reason for his political views; his father worked as a fireman and mechanic, and his mother worked as a clerk at a gas company.

His first job, when he was 14, was at a radio station, where he read the news and weather. He was elected governor of Arkansas by his chapter of the American Legion–sponsored Boys State program in 1972. He was student council vice president at Hope High School during the 1971–1972 school year, then was student council president during the 1972–1973 school year. He has one sister, Pat Harris, a middle school teacher. He entered the ministry in 1972 at Garrett Memorial Baptist Church in Hope.

Huckabee married Janet McCain on May 25, 1974. He graduated from Ouachita Baptist University on May 8, 1978, completing his bachelor's degree in religion before attending Southwestern Baptist Theological Seminary in Fort Worth, Texas. He dropped out of the seminary after one year in order to take a job in Christian broadcasting.

== Pastoral career ==
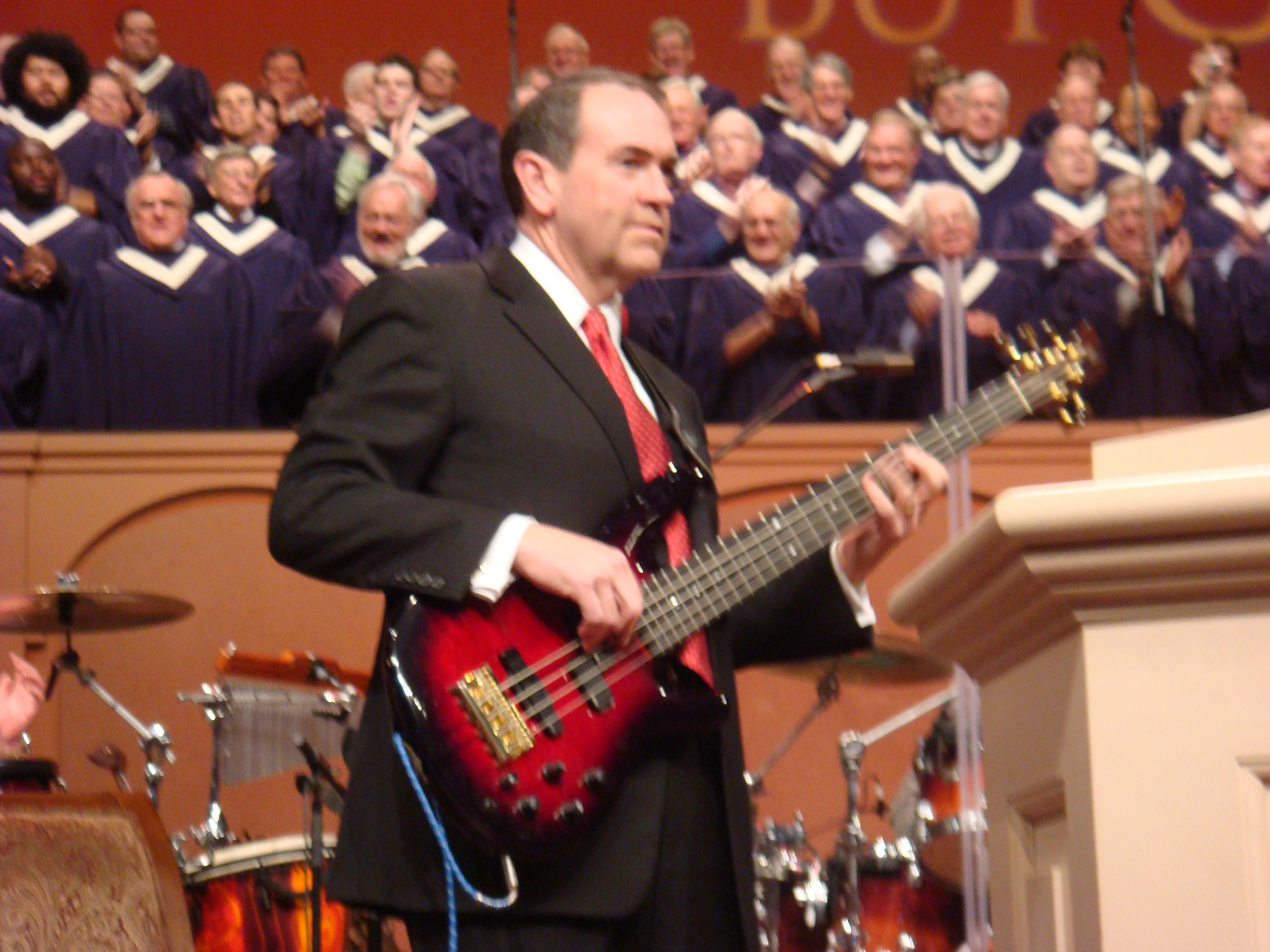
Huckabee playing bass guitar at Thomas Road Baptist Church in 2008

At age 21, Huckabee was a staffer for televangelist James Robison. Robison commented, "His convictions shape his character and his character will shape his policies. His whole life has been shaped by moral absolutes." Prior to his political career, he served as pastor at Immanuel Baptist Church in Pine Bluff, Arkansas, from 1980 to 1986, and the Beech Street First Baptist Church in Texarkana, from 1986 to 1992.

Huckabee started 24-hour television stations in both Pine Bluff and Texarkana, where he produced documentaries and hosted a program called Positive Alternatives. He encouraged the all-white Immanuel Baptist Church to accept black members in the mid-1980s. Years later, he wrote about the insights he gained as a minister:

My experience dealing every day with real people who were genuinely affected by policies created by government gave me a deep understanding of the fragility of the human spirit and vulnerability of so many families who struggled from week to week. I was in the ICU at 2 a.m. with families faced with the decision to disconnect a respirator on their loved one; I counseled fifteen-year-old pregnant girls who were afraid to tell their parents about their condition; I spent hours hearing the grief of women who had been physically and emotionally clobbered by an abusive husband; I saw the anguish in the faces of an elderly couple when their declining health forced them to sell their home, give up their independence, and move into a long-term-care facility; I listened to countless young couples pour out their souls as they struggled to get their marriages into survival mode when confronted with overextended debt ...

In 1989, Huckabee ran against Ronnie Floyd of Springdale for the presidency of the Arkansas Baptist State Convention. Huckabee won and served as president from 1989 to 1991.

Huckabee has received two honorary doctorates: a Doctor of Humane Letters, received from John Brown University in 1991, and a Doctor of Laws from Ouachita Baptist University in 1992.

== Political career ==
=== Lieutenant Governor of Arkansas, campaign 1992 ===
In Huckabee's first political race in 1992, he lost to incumbent Democratic senator Dale Bumpers, receiving 40 percent of the vote in the general election. In the same election, Arkansas governor Bill Clinton was elected president, making lieutenant governor Jim Guy Tucker the new governor when Clinton resigned the governorship. In 1993, Republican state chairman Asa Hutchinson urged Huckabee to run in the special election for lieutenant governor held on July 27. Realizing his loss came among key conservative Democrats, Huckabee ran a decidedly conservative campaign. In the subsequent general election, he defeated Nate Coulter, who had been Bumpers's campaign manager the previous year, 51–49 percent. Huckabee became the second Republican since Reconstruction to serve as Arkansas lieutenant governor, the first having been Maurice Britt from 1967 to 1971.

In his autobiography From Hope to Higher Ground, Huckabee recalled the chilly reception that he received from the Arkansas Democratic establishment on his election as lieutenant governor: "The doors to my office were spitefully nailed shut from the inside, office furniture and equipment were removed, and the budget spent down to almost nothing prior to our arriving. After fifty-nine days of public outcry, the doors were finally opened for me to occupy the actual office I had been elected to hold two months earlier."

Dick Morris, who had previously worked for Bill Clinton, advised Huckabee on his races in 1993, 1994, and 1998. Huckabee commented that Morris was a "personal friend". A newspaper article reported on Huckabee's 1993 win: "Morris said the mistake Republicans always make is that they are too much of a country club set. What we wanted to do was run a progressive campaign that would appeal to all Arkansans.'"

Morris elaborated, "So we opened the campaign with ads that characterized Mike as more of a moderate whose values were the same as those of other Arkansans." Consequently, he abandoned his earlier support for the Council of Conservative Citizens (CofCC) when in April 1994 following an adverse media campaign against the CofCC, Huckabee withdrew from a speaking engagement before their national convention. He repeated the accusations made by various media and civil rights organizations such as the Southern Poverty Law Center recalling his past association with the CofCC saying, "I will not participate in any program that has racist overtones. I've spent a lifetime fighting [against] racism and anti-Semitism."

In 1994, Huckabee was re-elected to a full term as lieutenant governor, beating Democratic candidate Charlie Cole Chaffin with nearly 59 percent of the vote. While lieutenant governor, Huckabee accepted $71,500 in speaking fees and traveling expenses from a nonprofit group, Action America. R. J. Reynolds was the group's largest contributor.

In October 1995, David Pryor announced that he was retiring from the United States Senate. Huckabee then announced he was running for the open seat and moved ahead in the polls, but ultimately dropped out of the race to lead the state after incumbent governor Jim Guy Tucker resigned following his fraud and conspiracy convictions.

During his campaign, Huckabee opposed in December then-governor Tucker's plan for a constitutional convention. The plan was defeated by voters, 80–20 percent, in a special election. In January 1996, Huckabee campaigned in televised ads paid for by the Republican National Committee and the Arkansas Republican Party against a highway referendum. Tucker supported the referendum, which included tax increases and a bond program, to improve 1,300 miles (2,100 km) of highway. On the referendum, the bond question, which included a sales tax increase and a gas tax increase, lost 87–13 percent. A second question, a five-cent increase on diesel tax, lost 86–14 percent. Huckabee also opposed Tucker's plan for school consolidation.

=== Governor of Arkansas (1996–2007) ===
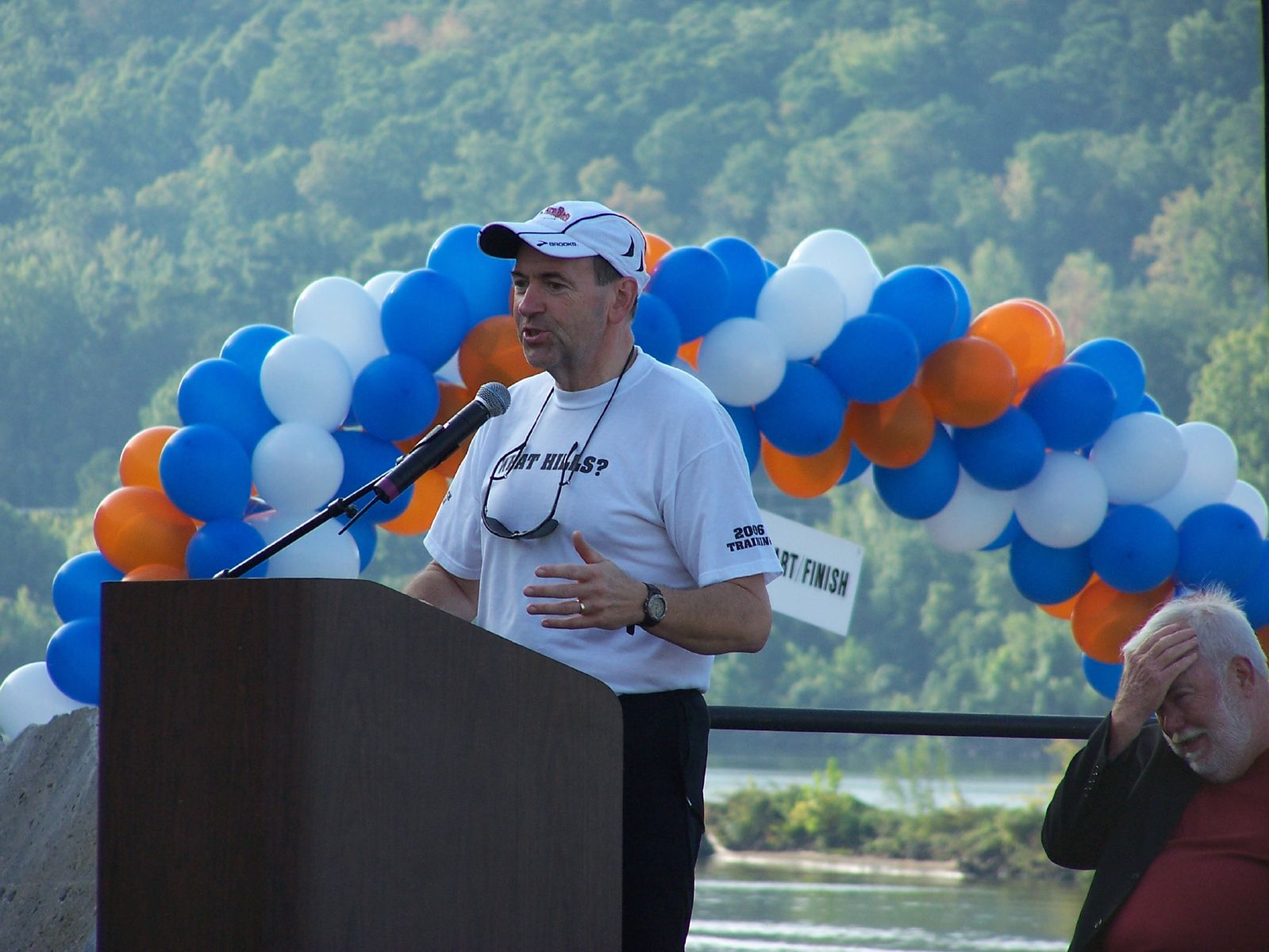
Governor Huckabee at the 2006 Opening Ceremony of the Big Dam Bridge

In May 1996, Tucker was convicted "on one count of arranging nearly $3 million in fraudulent loans" as part of the Whitewater controversy. The Arkansas Constitution, like nearly all state constitutions in the United States, does not allow convicted felons to hold office. Tucker thus promised to resign by July 15. Huckabee then announced he would quit the Senate race and instead fill the unexpired term of Tucker. However, Tucker, insisting he had a strong case for appeal, rescinded his resignation as Huckabee was preparing to be sworn in on July 15. Within a few hours, Tucker reinstated his resignation after Huckabee and the legislature threatened to initiate impeachment proceedings against Tucker. Huckabee was then duly sworn in as governor.

In November 1998, Huckabee was elected to a full four-year term by defeating retired colonel Gene McVay in the primary and Jonesboro attorney and Democratic candidate Bill Bristow in the general election, becoming the state's third elected Republican governor since Reconstruction. According to a CNN exit poll, Huckabee received 48% of the African American vote in his 1998 election; but some experts have questioned whether those numbers are a representative sample on how he did on the whole in the election.

In 2001, Huckabee was named "Friend of a Taxpayer" by Americans for Tax Reform for his cut in statewide spending.

In November 2002, Huckabee was reelected to his second four-year term by defeating State Treasurer Jimmie Lou Fisher, garnering 53 percent of the vote. His reelection came despite the defeat in the general election of fellow Republican U.S. Senator Tim Hutchinson.

Huckabee received widespread praise for his state's rapid response to Hurricane Katrina. In 2005, Time named him one of the five best governors in the U.S., writing "Huckabee has approached his state's troubles with energy and innovation" and referred to him as "a mature, consensus-building conservative who earns praise from fellow Evangelicals and, occasionally, liberal Democrats." Governing magazine likewise honored Huckabee as one of its 2005 Public Officials of the Year. Additionally, he was among those legislators given the APHA Distinguished Public Health Legislator of the Year Award by the American Public Health Association for that same year.

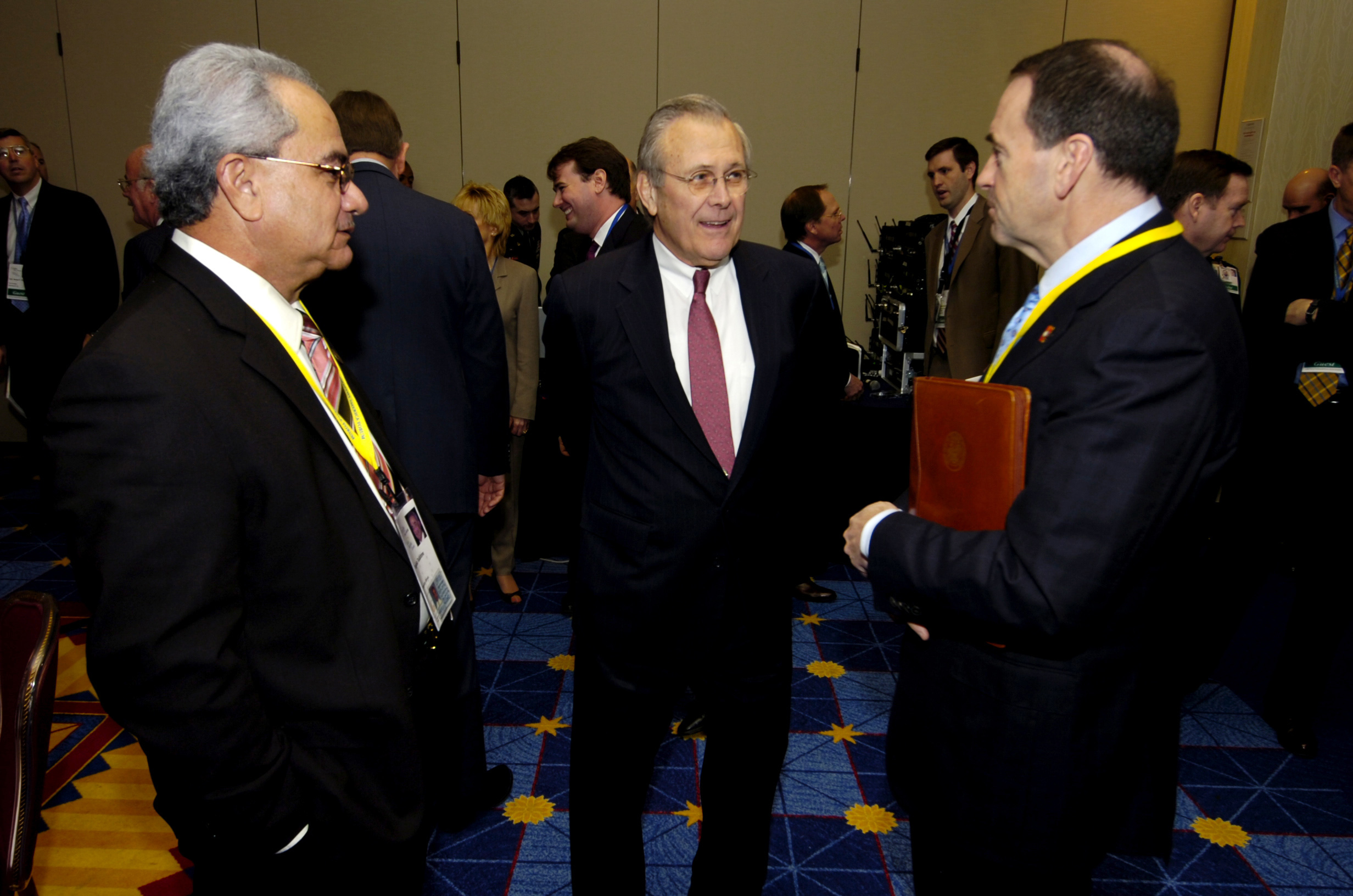
Huckabee with Secretary of Defense Donald Rumsfeld and American Samoa governor Togiola Tulafono in 2006

In 2006, he was presented with AARP's Impact Award for his health initiatives.

In December 2008, Huckabee became an honorary member of Tau Kappa Epsilon fraternity. He said that he did not have time to join a fraternity in college because he had to "cram four years into a little more than two." The fraternity's CEO said they were "very impressed with his character and the initiatives he headed" as governor.

By the end of his term, Huckabee held the 3rd-longest tenure of any Arkansas governor. Only Democrats Orval Faubus, who served 6 consecutive 2-year terms (1955–1967), and Bill Clinton, who served 11 years, 11 months (1979–1981; 1983–1992), had longer tenures.

During his tenure as governor, Huckabee supported tax reforms including tax cuts and increases, that netted $505 million for the state. According to columnist Margaret Carlson, that money was used to improve roads, health care and schools in the state.

==== Clemencies ====
As governor, Huckabee commuted and accepted recommendations for pardon for twice as many sentences as his 3 predecessors combined; in total: 1,033 prisoners. Twelve had previously been convicted of murder. Though Huckabee pardoned more than his predecessors, the state prison size and number of people executed were greater as well, Huckabee denied 92% of all clemency requests during his 10.5 years as governor. Most pardons and commutations were not for prisoners but for those whose sentences had ended and who were seeking work. Huckabee's pardons and commutations became an issue during the 2008 Republican Primary, with most of the controversy focusing on Wayne Dumond.

Huckabee's handling of clemency petitions received national attention in November 2009 with the case of Maurice Clemmons, who had committed burglary without a weapon at 16. The Prison Transfer Board unanimously requested a sentence commutation for Clemmons as did the trial judge. Clemmons's 60-year sentence was commuted by Huckabee to 47 years, making him eligible for parole if approved by the parole board. After parole in 2000, Clemmons was arrested for multiple offenses including child molestation and aggravated assault but was released after prosecutors declined to file charges. After Clemmons murdered four police officers in Lakewood, Washington, a two-day manhunt ensued, and Clemmons was shot and killed by a Seattle Police Department officer after refusing police orders to stop charging the officer.

In his book about the shooting, The Other Side of Mercy, Jonathan Martin of The Seattle Times wrote that Huckabee apparently failed to review Clemmons's prison file, which was "thick with acts of violence and absent indications of rehabilitation." Huckabee stated that the recommendation to reduce the sentence was unanimous and supported by the trial judge, that the decision to parole him was made by the parole board, not him, and that Clemmons had been re-arrested and the decision not to file charges then had nothing to do with him.

=== 2008 presidential election campaign ===
Huckabee announced his run for the White House on Meet the Press on January 28, 2007.

At the August 11 Iowa Straw Poll, Huckabee took second place with 2,587 votes, roughly 18 percent, splitting the conservative Republican party votes amongst other candidates. Huckabee spent $57.98 per vote in the Straw Poll, which is the lowest among the top three finishers. Huckabee drew attention with an unconventional ad featuring Chuck Norris. In a later ad Huckabee wished voters a merry Christmas, and said that "what really matters is the celebration of the birth of Christ."

In November 2007, Huckabee drew endorsements from a large number of religious activists, including Billy McCormack, a pastor in Shreveport, Louisiana, and a director and vice president of the Christian Coalition of America, founded in 1988 by a previous presidential candidate, Pat Robertson. He was criticized for using a bookshelf that resembled a cross in a Christmas commercial as a form of signaling to Christians, and laughed them off saying "I will confess this: If you play the spot backwards, it says, 'Paul is dead. Paul is dead.'"

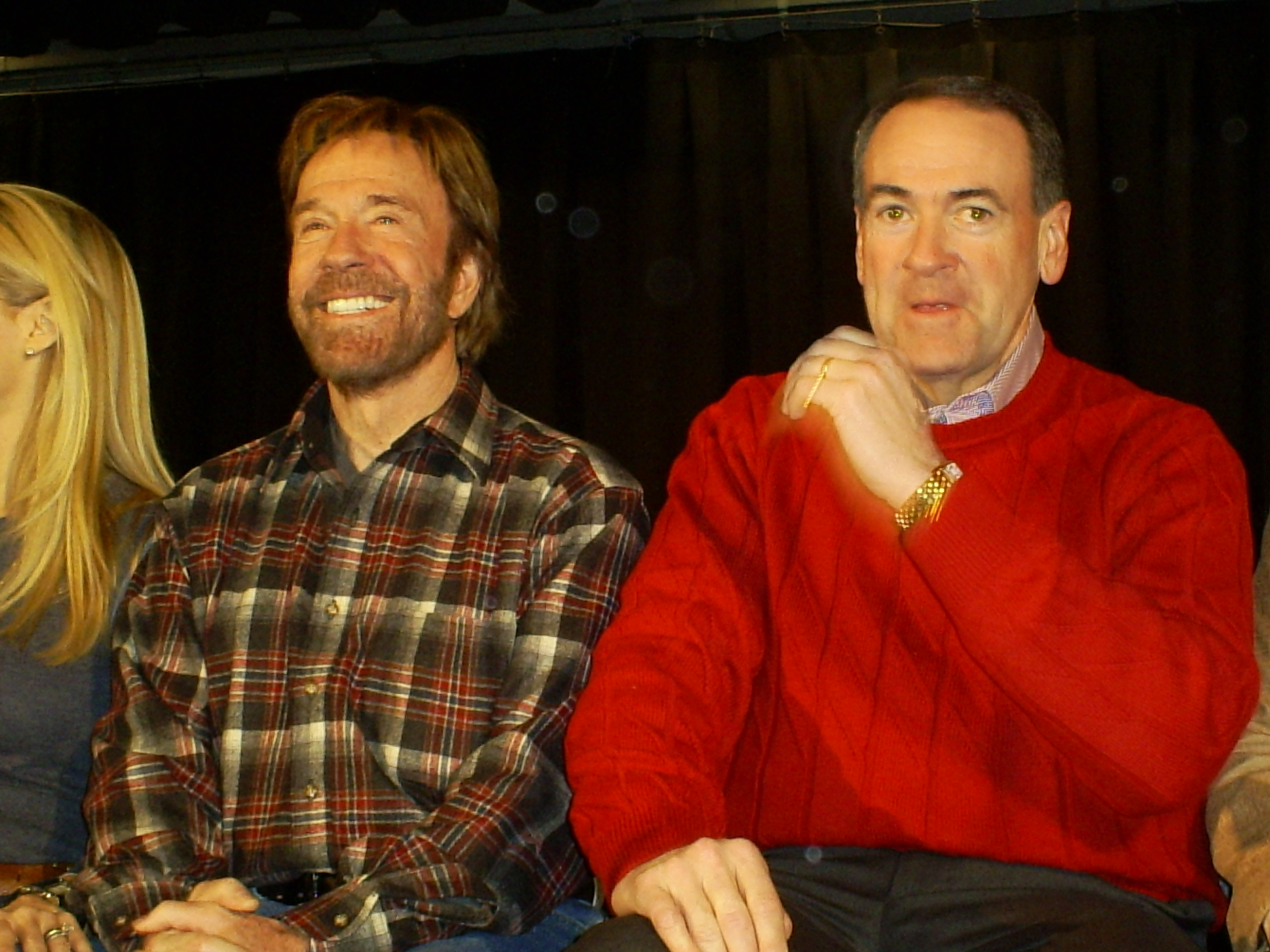
Huckabee with actor Chuck Norris in Londonderry, New Hampshire in 2008

He also faced a "drumbeat" of questions about the role of faith in his gubernatorial administration and about past statements he made in 1998 about the U.S. being a "Christian nation" in which he said, "I hope we answer the alarm clock and take this nation back for Christ." Huckabee told NBC that his comment was not politically incorrect and was "appropriate to be said to a gathering of Southern Baptists." Huckabee has credited God with some of his political success.

On January 3, 2008, Huckabee won the Iowa Republican caucuses, receiving 34% of the electorate and 17 delegates, compared with the 25% of Mitt Romney, who finished second, receiving 12 delegates; Fred Thompson, who came in third place and received three delegates; John McCain, who came in fourth place and received three delegates; and Ron Paul, who came in fifth place and received two delegates.

On January 8, 2008, Huckabee finished in third place in the New Hampshire primary, behind John McCain in first place, and Mitt Romney who finished second, with Huckabee receiving one more delegate for a total of 18 delegates, gained via elections, and 21 total delegates, versus 30 total (24 via elections) for Romney, and 10 for McCain (all via elections).

On January 15, 2008, Huckabee finished in third place in the 2008 Michigan Republican primary, behind John McCain in second place; Mitt Romney, who finished first; and ahead of Ron Paul, who finished in fourth place.

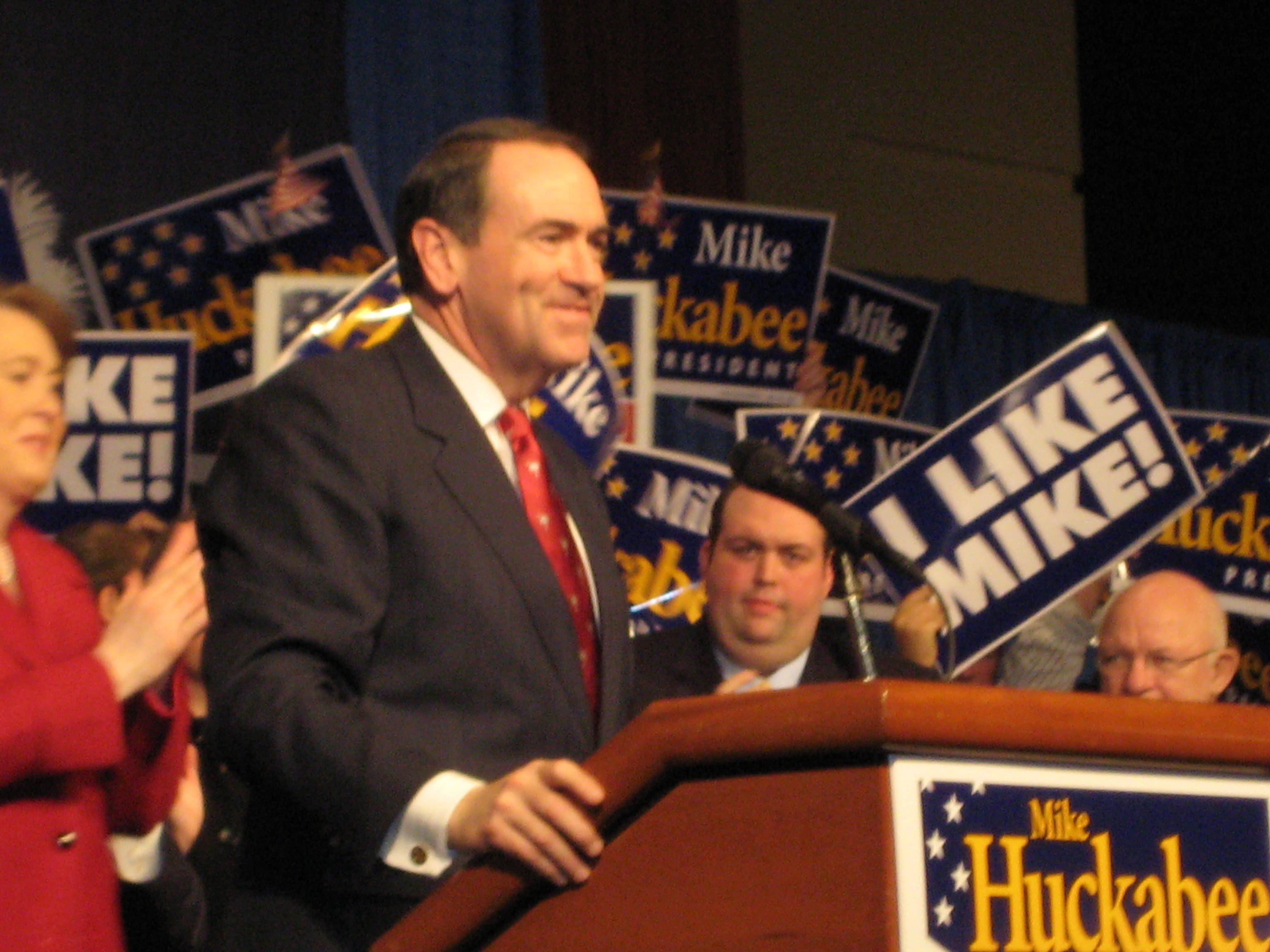
Huckabee giving a speech following the South Carolina 2008 presidential primary in Columbia, SC

On January 19, 2008, Huckabee finished in second place in the 2008 South Carolina Republican primary, behind John McCain, who finished first and ahead of Fred Thompson, who finished third.

On January 21, 2008, Huckabee received the endorsement of 50 African American leaders in Atlanta, Georgia. The endorsers cited Huckabee's record on abortion, education, minorities, the economy, the prison system, and immigration as Arkansas governor. However, NBC reported that the endorsement of African American leaders at the Atlanta event was 36, and "most of them connected to conservative religious organizations."

On January 29, 2008, Huckabee finished in fourth place in the Florida primary, behind Rudy Giuliani in third, Mitt Romney in second, and John McCain in first place.

On February 5, 2008, Huckabee won the first contest of "Super Tuesday", the West Virginia GOP state convention, but only after the McCain campaign provided their delegates, thereby giving Huckabee 52% of the electorate to Mitt Romney's 47%. Backers of rival John McCain said they threw Huckabee their support to prevent Mitt Romney from capturing the winner-take-all GOP state convention vote. Consequently, he also registered victories in Alabama, Arkansas, Georgia and Tennessee on Super Tuesday, bringing his delegate count up to 156, compared with 689 for Republican party front-runner John McCain.

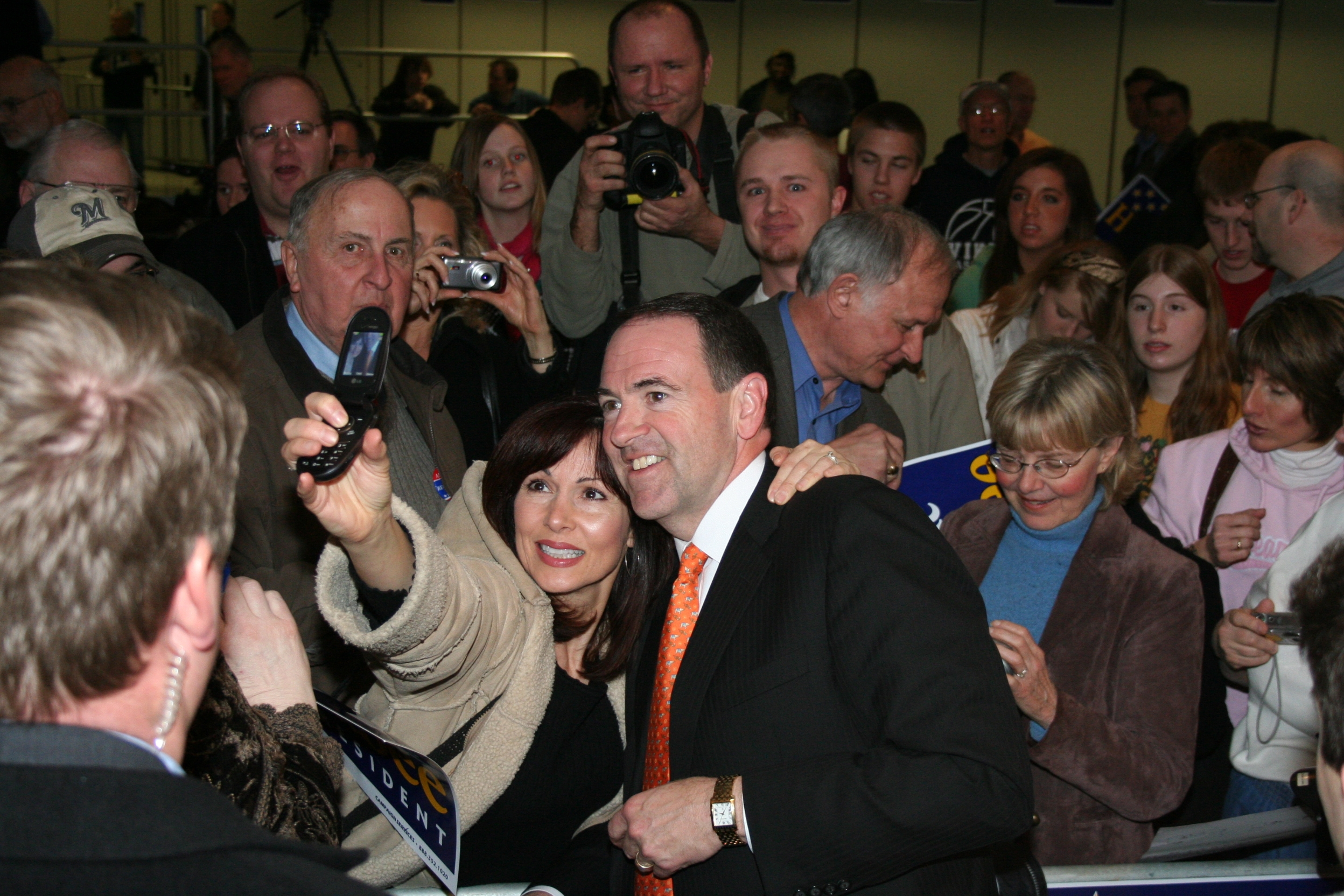
Huckabee with a supporter at a campaign rally in Wisconsin

On February 9, 2008, Huckabee won the first election following Super Tuesday, by winning 60% of the vote in the Kansas Republican Caucuses. This was also the first contest to be held without Mitt Romney, who was said to be splitting the conservative vote with Huckabee. Huckabee also won the Louisiana Republican Primary with 44% of the vote to John McCain's 43% in second. Although Huckabee won the primary he was not awarded any delegates, because of state party rules that stated a candidate must pass the 50% threshold to receive the state's pledged delegates.

On March 4, 2008, Huckabee withdrew from seeking the candidacy as it became apparent he would lose in Texas, where he had hoped to win, and that John McCain would get the 1,191 delegates required to win the Republican nomination. Huckabee finished the race with 240 pledged delegates.

==== Vice presidential candidate speculation ====
Even though Huckabee had signed a television contract and a book deal with a pressing deadline, he was mentioned by most to be on then-presumptive Republican presidential nominee John McCain's short list for his vice presidential running mate. The late pundit Tim Russert even referred to Huckabee as "Vice President Huckabee" several times when he appeared on Meet The Press on May 18, 2008. Huckabee was eventually passed over for Sarah Palin.

Former president Bill Clinton praised Huckabee and called him a rising star in the Republican Party. Clinton and Huckabee collaborated on initiatives such as the fight against childhood obesity. Former Tennessee Republican Party chairman and Huckabee's former campaign manager Chip Saltsman has called Governor Huckabee, "The most successful failed presidential candidate in the history of our country."

=== Speculated 2012 presidential campaign ===
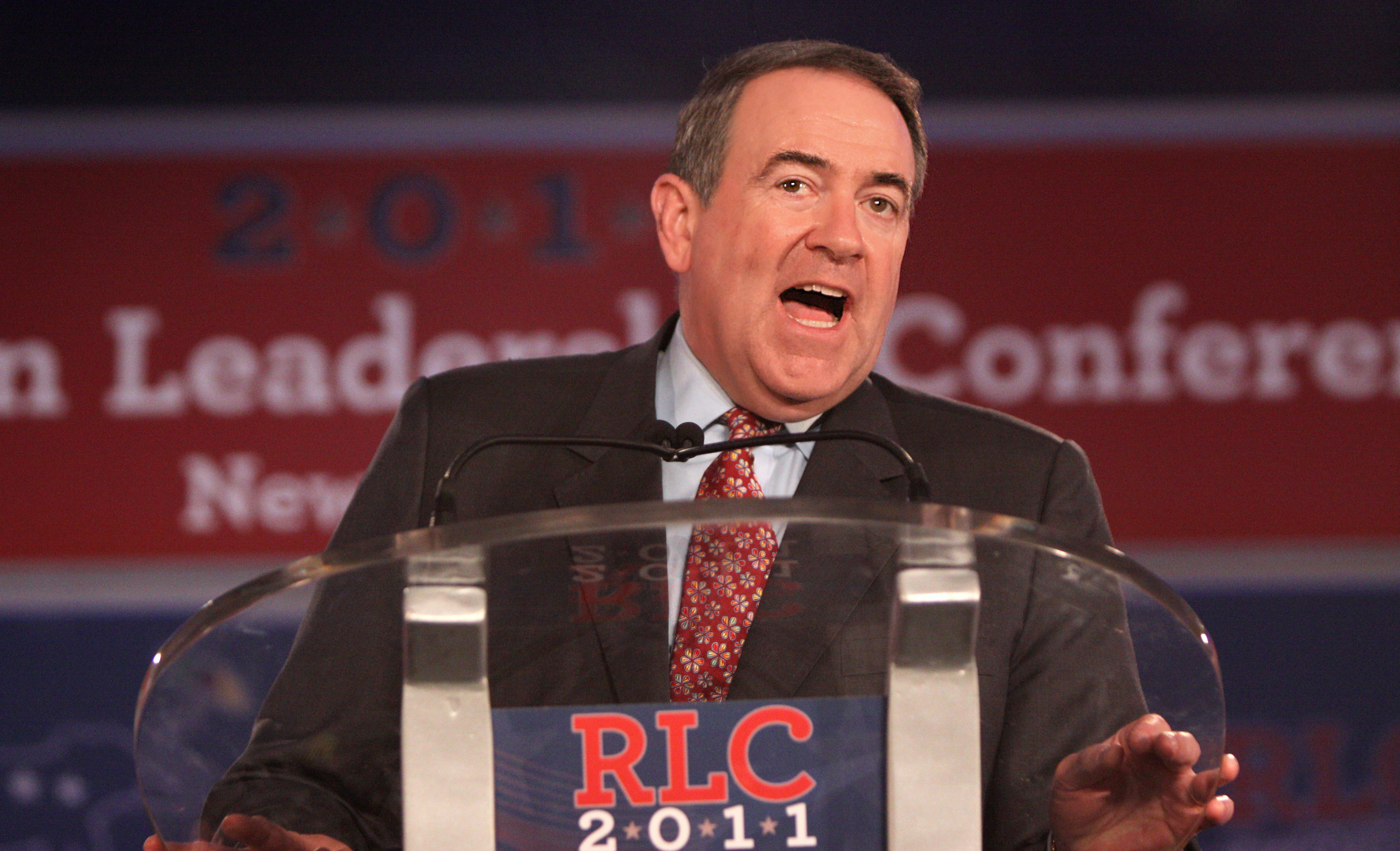
Former governor Huckabee speaking at the 2011 Republican Leadership Conference in New Orleans, Louisiana

In a November 19, 2008, article by the Associated Press, Huckabee addressed the possibility of running for president in 2012. He said, "I'm not ruling anything out for the future, but I'm not making any specific plans."

Amid speculation about a future run for the presidency, a CNN poll in December 2008 found Huckabee at the top of the list of 2012 GOP contenders, along with former Alaskan governor Sarah Palin, fellow 2008 presidential candidate Mitt Romney, and former Speaker of the House Newt Gingrich.

On December 3, 2008, Cincinnati-based NBC affiliate WLWT asked Huckabee about the prospect of running, to which he said, "I'm pretty sure I'll be out there. Whether it's for myself or somebody else I may decide will be a better standard bearer, that remains to be seen."

A June 2009 CNN/Opinion Research Corporation national poll showed Huckabee as the 2012 presidential co-favorite of the Republican electorate along with Palin and Romney. An October 2009 poll of Republicans by Rasmussen Reports put Huckabee in the lead with 29%, followed by Romney on 24% and Palin on 18%. In a November 2009 Gallup poll, Huckabee was shown as the leading Republican contender for 2012. In November 2010 CNN projected in a poll that Huckabee would defeat Barack Obama in a hypothetical 2012 contest. In a Rasmussen poll taken January 11–14, 2011, Huckabee was even with Obama at 43% each.

Huckabee took stances opposed to the nature of the incumbent president, Barack Obama. In comments made March 1, 2011, on The Steve Malzberg Show, Huckabee said of Obama, "I would love to know more. What I know is troubling enough. And one thing that I do know is his having grown up in Kenya, his view of the Brits, for example, is very different than the average American." (This is a reference to the Mau Mau Uprising against the colonial rule of the United Kingdom in 1952; Obama himself has never lived in Kenya.)

On May 14, 2011, Huckabee announced on his FNC show that he would not be a candidate for the GOP presidential nomination in 2012. Despite his high national poll numbers and being seen by many as the front runner, Huckabee declined to run, saying, "All the factors say 'go,' but my heart says 'no.'"

=== 2016 presidential campaign ===
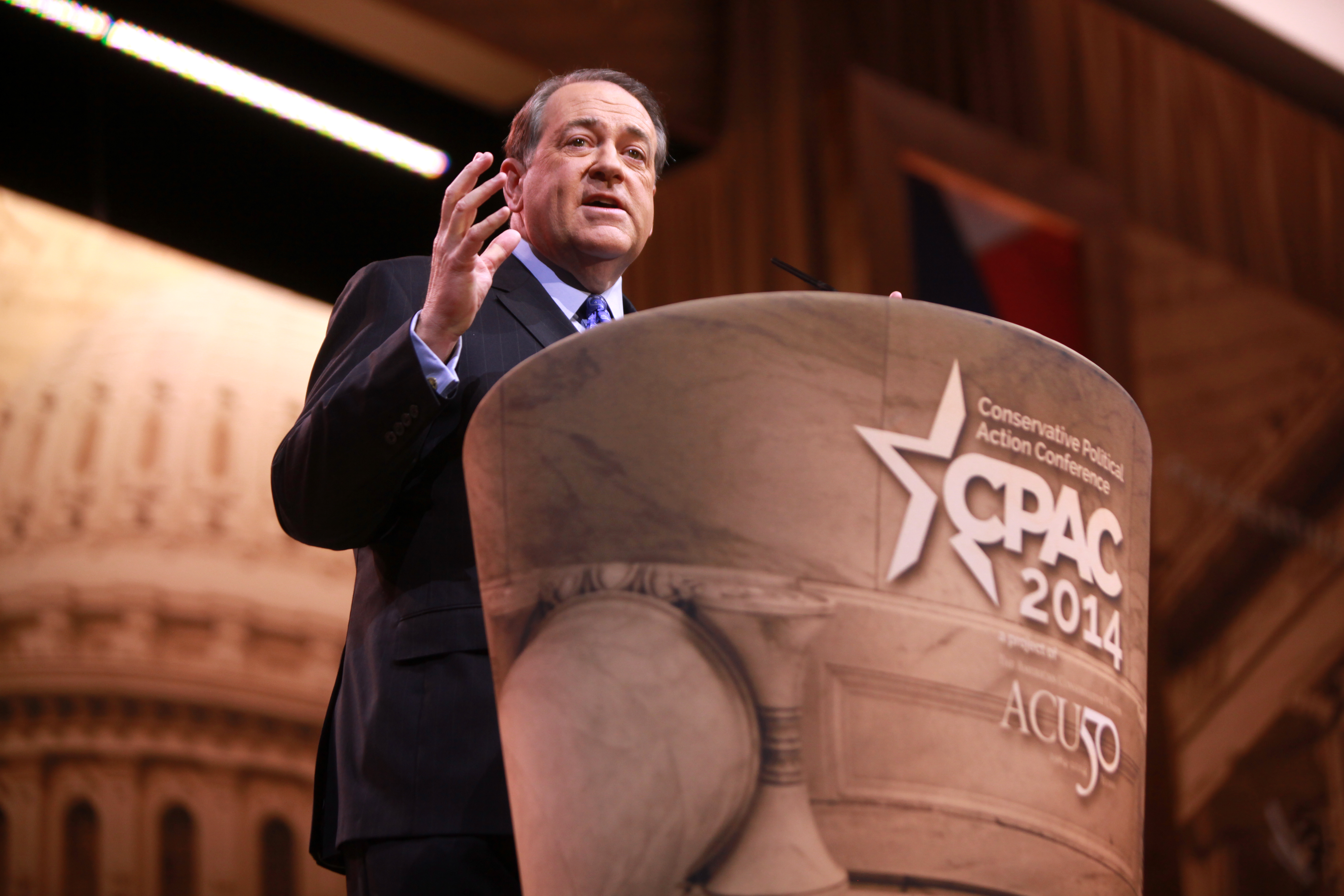
Huckabee speaking at 2014 Conservative Political Action Conference (CPAC) in Maryland

Political commentators speculated that Huckabee might be ready for another presidential run in 2016. He was limited by a lack of money in 2008 but with changes to federal election law allowing SuperPACs to pour large sums of money into a race he might be better positioned to stay in the race. Huckabee has in addition earned personal wealth since 2008 on the lecture circuit and his TV and radio shows. He ended his daily radio show in December 2013, which strengthened speculations about a presidential bid.

Huckabee indicated in September 2014 that he would make the decision on whether to run early in 2015. In January 2015, Huckabee ended his show on FNC to prepare for his possible run in the 2016 presidential election. On March 30, 2015, Huckabee supporters launched a Super PAC to make preparations for his run for the presidential ticket in 2016.

On May 5, 2015, in his hometown of Hope, Arkansas, Huckabee announced a campaign to seek the Republican nomination for president of the United States in the 2016 election. In his speech, Huckabee attacked trade deals that he said drive down U.S. wages, opposed raising the age for Social Security benefits, criticized President Obama for what he said was putting more pressure on Israel than Iran, and made an unusual plea for donations of $15 or $25 a month, saying: "I will ask you to give something in the name of your children and grandchildren."

On February 1, 2016, after a disappointing showing in the Iowa caucus Huckabee decided that he was going to suspend his campaign.

=== First Trump administration ===
Following the 2016 U.S. presidential election, Huckabee met with President-elect of the United States Donald Trump, whom he had supported for the Republican nomination after ending his own campaign in February. It was reported by The Daily Mail and The Jerusalem Post that Trump offered Huckabee the position of United States ambassador to Israel. Huckabee denied the reports. He told Fox News that a possible cabinet appointment for himself was discussed but that he turned the offer down, saying, "I'm not sure it was the right fit."

His daughter Sarah Huckabee Sanders served as White House press secretary to President Donald Trump from July 2017 until July 2019.

Following Trump's defeat by Joe Biden in the 2020 presidential election, Huckabee supported Trump's legal challenges in closely contested states, stating, "I think he owes it to all of us to make sure the election was fair. I am not saying it wasn't, I don't know. But we need to know, we have to have an answer to the questions that linger." On November 15, in a letter addressed to Joe Biden first posted on his website, Huckabee made unsubstantiated claims of election fraud in the 2020 election.

=== United States ambassador to Israel (2025–present) ===
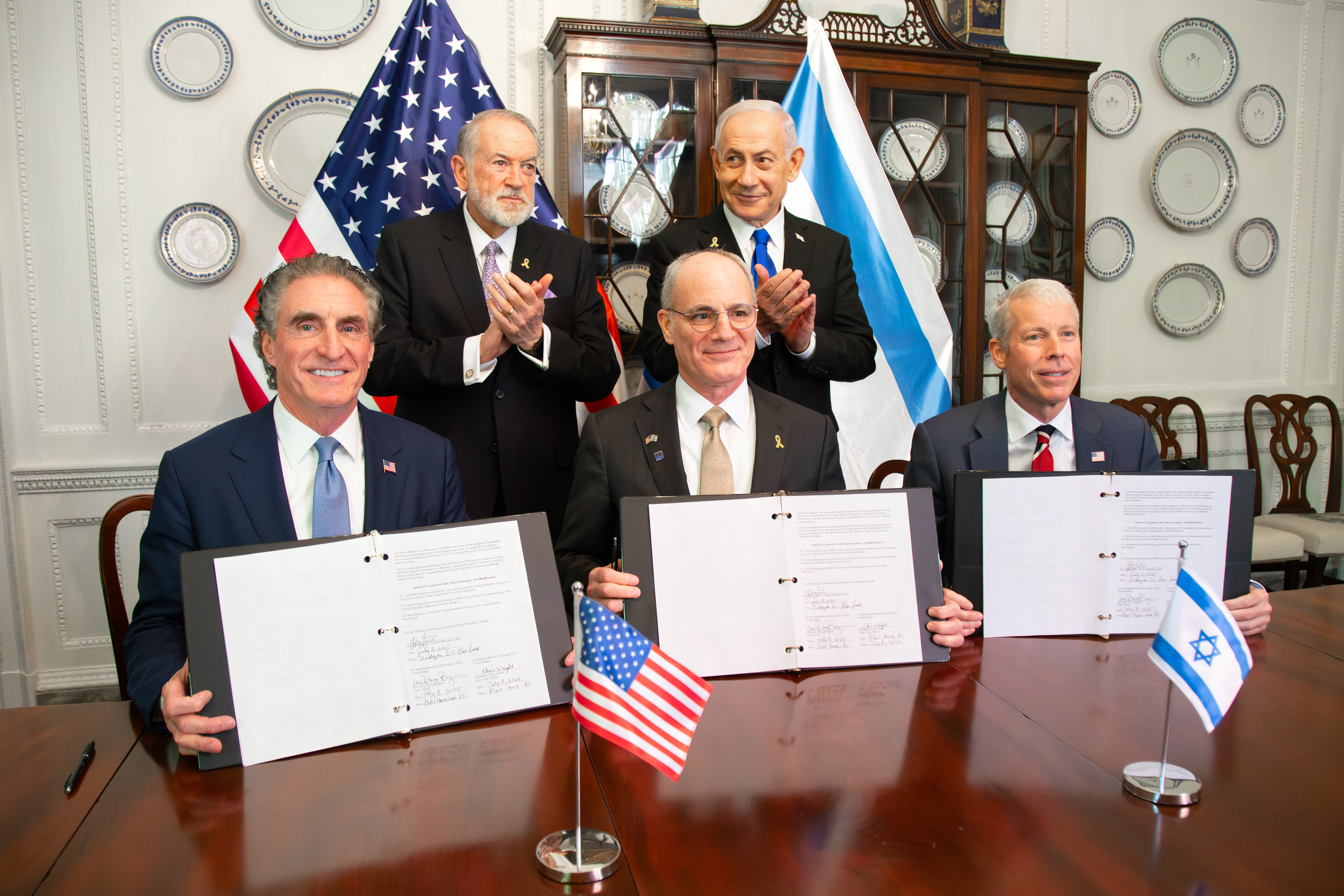
Huckabee and Israeli Prime Minister Benjamin Netanyahu at the Signing of an MOU on Cooperation in Energy and AI, July 8, 2025

On November 12, 2024, President-elect Donald Trump announced his intention to nominate Huckabee as the next U.S. ambassador to Israel. He stated that Huckabee would "bring peace to the Middle East". On February 12, 2025, Huckabee's nomination was sent to the Senate, and on April 9, 2025, it was approved by the United States Senate by a vote of 53–46. Huckabee was sworn in later that day. He arrived in Israel on April 17, 2025, and presented his credentials to President Isaac Herzog on April 21, 2025.

In June 2025, during the Iran–Israel war, Huckabee sent Trump a text message in which he told him that God had spared him in the attempted assassination of Donald Trump in Pennsylvania so that he could become the "most consequential President in a century—maybe ever." He added that Trump would "hear from Heaven" with respect to whether or not the U.S. should bomb Iran. Trump shared the message on his social media platform Truth Social.

In July, Huckabee complained to Israel's interior minister about a bureaucratic holdup of visas for American evangelical groups. The issue was resolved after he threatened reciprocal treatment for Israelis seeking visas for travel to the United States.

On August 1, 2025, Huckabee and Trump's Middle East Envoy Steve Witkoff visited the Gaza Humanitarian Foundation distribution center in Gaza.

In October 2025, conservative commentator Tucker Carlson interviewed far-right commentator Nick Fuentes on his podcast. On the podcast, Carlson called Huckabee and other Republicans "Christian Zionists" who had been "seized by this brain virus." Huckabee posted on Twitter that he "Wasn't aware that Tucker despises me. I do get that a lot from people not familiar with the Bible or history. Somehow, I will survive the animosity." Ted Cruz defended Huckabee as "a pastor and a patriot who loves America, loves Israel, and loves Jesus."

On November 20, 2025, the New York Times reported that Huckabee had hosted Jonathan Pollard at the Embassy of the United States in Jerusalem in July. Pollard, a former Navy intelligence analyst, was sentenced to life in prison in 1987 for selling American state secrets to Israel; he was released in 2015 and emigrated to Israel in 2020. While the embassy disputed the Times' framing of the meeting, it confirmed its occurrence. Interviewed by the Times, Pollard stated that the meeting was "friendly" and that its "main purpose" was to thank Huckabee for his support for Pollard during his incarceration, as Huckabee had publicly advocated for his release since 2011. The White House stated that it hadn't been aware of the meeting, but that President Trump "stands by" Huckabee.

In February 2026, when asked by Tucker Carlson whether Israel had a right to the lands corresponding to a version of Greater Israel which constituted "essentially the entire Middle East", Huckabee stated that it "would be fine if they took it all", although he stated that Israel was "not asking to take it over" and did not want the land, but is "asking to at least take the land that they now occupy" to protect its people. His remarks were condemned by several countries and international organizations, including Jordan, Egypt, Pakistan, Qatar, Saudi Arabia, Turkey, the United Arab Emirates, the Arab League, and the Organization of Islamic Cooperation, who reaffirmed that the remarks contradicted Trump's Gaza peace plan and that Israel has no sovereignty over the occupied Palestinian territories or other Arab lands. Afterwards, Huckabee wrote that Carlson had "edited out my full response".

In June 2026, during the International Conference on Israeli Heritage in Judea and Samaria, Huckabee stated that it was his responsibility to represent Israel's importance to the United States. He said that Israel's heritage was also part of the heritage of the United States, adding, "Without Israel, without the Jewish foundation, there would not be America. We owe our very existence to what happened in this land." His remarks came after President Donald Trump said that "without the United States, there would be no Israel" and that "without me, there would be no Israel."

In July 2026, after US Representative Ro Khanna was detained by armed settlers and Israeli soldiers in the ethnically cleansed village of Khirbet Zanuta, Huckabee stated that Israeli officials nor the embassy had no prior information about the trip, calling it an "unfortunate stint." Khanna disputed Huckabee's and the Israeli government's account, stating that the IDF were "lying" about the circumstances.

== Media career ==
On February 23, 2008, Huckabee appeared on Weekend Update during the 33rd season of Saturday Night Live.

On June 12, 2008, Fox News announced it was hiring Huckabee as a political commentator and regular contributor to their 2008 American presidential election coverage, in their New York election headquarters.

Huckabee filled in for Paul Harvey in July 2008. A few months later, he signed a deal with ABC Radio Networks (now Cumulus Media Networks) to carry a daily commentary, The Huckabee Report, beginning in January 2009. After Harvey's death his show replaced Harvey's broadcasts. On April 15, 2015, Huckabee announced that The Huckabee Report would be ending May 1.

Huckabee hosted a weekend show, Huckabee, on Fox News Channel, which premiered Saturday, September 27, 2008, at 8 PM EST. For six weeks in summer 2010, Fox test-ran The Huckabee Show for the syndicated market; Huckabee was joined by guest co-hosts in the daily spin-off, among them Bob Barker of The Price Is Right fame. Huckabee ended on January 3, 2015, so that Huckabee could consider the possibility of running for president.

On April 2, 2012, Huckabee launched a long-form daily talk show on Cumulus Media Networks, who provide the call-in guests. The show, which is targeted at second-tier broadcast stations, features long-form interviews and discussions and airs in the noon to 3 p.m. time slot, directly opposite the market leader in talk radio, The Rush Limbaugh Show. On November 27, 2013, Huckabee announced that the show will have its final broadcast on December 12, 2013, stating that he and Cumulus Media mutually decided not to renew the contract.

In a December 2013 interview, Huckabee stated that he would be launching a news organization in partnership with Christian Media Corp. International.

In October 2017, the Huckabee show was relaunched, now produced by and aired on the Trinity Broadcasting Network. The show ended on January 11, 2025, after Huckabee was nominated by President-elect Donald Trump to serve as ambassador to Israel.

== Political positions ==
=== Abortion ===
Huckabee opposes any public funding for abortion, and believes that abortion should be legal only when the life of the mother is at risk. He stated that it would "most certainly" be a good day for America if Roe v. Wade were reversed by the Supreme Court. This ultimately occurred in 2022 with the landmark Dobbs v. Jackson Women’s Health Organization case.

=== Health care ===
Huckabee opposed President Obama's healthcare plan, the Patient Protection and Affordable Care Act. He stated that he wants to "give citizens more control over their own healthcare choices."

=== Free trade ===
In his book From Hope to Higher Ground, Huckabee expressed support for free trade, but only if it is "fair trade". He identified excess litigation, excess taxation, and excess regulation as three factors contributing to the loss of American jobs, and has proposed economic sanctions on China.

=== Race relations ===
According to a CNN exit poll, Huckabee won 48% of African-American votes in his successful 1998 gubernatorial race in Arkansas. The 48% figure is often disputed due to the exit poll's small sample size. Huckabee says that it is important for Republicans such as himself to reach out to black voters, and in 2015, he ramped up efforts to win those votes.

In 2015, on an episode of Meet the Press, Huckabee stated that the confederate flag issue was for South Carolinians to decide, "not an issue for a person running for president," and days later, he congratulated Governor Nikki Haley on her decision to support the removal of the flag from the state capitol. Huckabee gave a speech at the 2008 Republican National Convention that included this: "I say with sincerity that I have great respect for Senator Obama's historic achievement to become his party's nominee—not because of his color, but with indifference to it. Party or politics aside, we celebrate this milestone because it elevates our country."

=== LGBT rights ===
Huckabee believes that marriage is between one man and one woman, and he opposes both same-sex marriage and civil unions. In 2006, he outlawed same-sex marriage in Arkansas; however, in 2007, he stated that Americans should "respect" gay couples. He says that adoptions should be child focused and opposes "gay adoptions". Huckabee, expounding upon his view on homosexuality, said the following:

This [gay marriage] is not just a political issue. It is a biblical issue. And as a biblical issue—unless I get a new version of the scriptures, it's really not my place to say, OK, I'm just going to evolve[.] ... It's like asking someone who's Jewish to start serving bacon-wrapped shrimp in their deli. We don't want to do that—I mean, we're not going to do that. Or like asking a Muslim to serve up something that is offensive to him, or to have dogs in his backyard[.] ... We're so sensitive to make sure we don't offend certain religions, but then we act like Christians can't have the convictions that they've had for 2,000 years.

In January 2015, he compared homosexuality to "drinking and swearing", insofar as it is "part of a lifestyle". Huckabee has stated he has gay friends, saying, "People can be my friends who have lifestyles that are not necessarily my lifestyle. I don't shut people out of my circle or out of my life because they have a different point of view[.]"

=== Role of religion in public life ===
Huckabee has voiced his belief in intelligent design and he has also stated that he does not believe that Darwin's theory of evolution is valid. In July 2004, he was quoted on Arkansans Ask, his regular show on the Arkansas Educational Television Network: "I think that students also should be given exposure to the theories not only of evolution but to the basis of those who believe in creationism."

In April 2011, Huckabee said, "I almost wish that there would be a simultaneous telecast and all Americans would be forced, at gunpoint, to listen to every David Barton message," in praise of the Christian revisionist author David Barton.

Within hours of the Sandy Hook Elementary School shooting, Huckabee made headlines in the U.S. and abroad for stating on Fox News: "We ask why there is violence in our schools, but we have systematically removed God from our schools," and he further asked, "Should we be so surprised that schools would become a place of carnage?"

In September 2014, Huckabee said, "Fire the ones who refuse to hear not only our hearts, but God's heart" (for which he was criticized by Richard Dawkins).

In September 2015, speaking about his support of religious freedom on behalf of Kentucky county clerk Kim Davis to radio host Michael Medved, Huckabee said, "Michael, the Dred Scott decision of 1857 still remains to this day the law of the land which says that black people aren't fully human. Does anybody still follow the Dred Scott Supreme Court decision?" (The decision in Dred Scott v. Sandford had been superseded by the Civil Rights Act of 1866 and nullified by the Thirteenth and Fourteenth Amendments to the U.S. Constitution.)

In June 2016, Huckabee, along with actor Pat Boone and executive producer Troy Duhon, all of whom were involved in the film God's Not Dead 2, sent a letter to California governor Jerry Brown opposing Senate Bill 1146, which "prohibits a person from being subjected to discrimination" at California colleges. Other than religious schools—those that train pastors and theology teachers—schools "might no longer be allowed to hire Christian-only staff, teach religious ideas in regular classes, require attendance at chapel services or keep bathrooms and dormitories restricted to either males or females."

=== Climate change ===
In 2023, Huckabee published Kids Guide to the Truth About Climate Change, which minimized the influence of human emissions on global warming. Marketed as an alternative to mainstream education, the publication does not attribute authorship or cite scientific credentials. The deputy director of the National Center for Science Education called the publication "propaganda" and "very unreliable as a guide to climate change for kids", noting that it represented "present day" atmospheric concentrations of carbon dioxide as 280 parts per million (ppm), which was true in 391 BC but short of 2023's actual concentration of 420 ppm.

=== Military ===
In 2007, Huckabee argued for a larger military and an increase in defense spending, writing, "Right now, we spend about 3.9 percent of our GDP on defense, compared with about six percent in 1986, under President Ronald Reagan. We need to return to that six percent level."

=== Immigration ===
During his 2016 bid for president, Huckabee released a nine-point immigration enforcement and border security plan. His plan included building a border fence, increased border patrol personnel, and increased visas for skilled workers who enter the country legally. Huckabee has previously stated he is opposed to using military resources for border patrol. Huckabee's plan also required all 11–12 million undocumented immigrants to register with the federal government and return to their home countries within 120 days. Failure to do so would carry a ten-year ban from entering the US.

=== Gun control ===
Huckabee has voiced his support for self-defense and the castle doctrine, and has generally taken an anti-gun control stance. He believes that the concealed carrying of weapons should be allowed.

=== Fiscal policy ===
As governor of Arkansas, Huckabee received grades of B in 1998, C in 2000, C in 2002, D in 2004, and F in 2006 from the Cato Institute, a libertarian think tank, in their biennial Fiscal Policy Report Card on America's Governors.

=== Israel and Palestine ===
Huckabee is a strong supporter of Israel, opposing Palestinian statehood and rejecting Palestinian identity as "a political tool to try and force land away from Israel". In 2008, Huckabee said that there is "really no such thing as a Palestinian". In 2017, at an event in the West Bank, he stated, "There is no such thing as a West Bank—it's Judea and Samaria. There's no such thing as a settlement. They're communities. They're neighborhoods. They're cities. There's no such thing as an occupation."

Huckabee described the October 7 attacks in 2023 as "horrific" and "beyond anything I've ever witnessed in my lifetime".

On June 1, 2025, Huckabee said that if France wanted a Palestinian state, it should "carve" it out of the French Riviera. On July 25, he posted on X a link to a Jewish News Syndicate staff article titled "France to recognize Palestinian state, drawing Israeli, US reproach", and wrote, "How clever! If Macron can just 'declare' the existence of a state perhaps the UK can 'declare' France a British colony!"

In July 2026, speaking at the Israeli Ministry of Foreign Affairs, Huckabee stated that 700,000 Americans live in Israel, roughly equivalent to the representation of an American congressional district and called Israel the "436th congressional district of the U.S."

== Personal life ==
=== Music ===
Huckabee plays bass guitar with recording artist Ayla Brown in 2015.

Huckabee is an amateur musician who plays the bass guitar in his classic-rock cover band, Capitol Offense. The group has played for political events and parties, including entertaining at unofficial inaugural balls in Washington, D.C., in January 2001.

In 2007, Huckabee was given the Music for Life Award by the National Association of Music Merchants (NAMM) for his music education advocacy.

=== Organizations ===
Huckabee was made the chair of the Southern Governors' Association in 1999 and served in that capacity through 2000. He has chaired the Southern Growth Policies Board, the Southern Regional Education Board, the Southern Technology Council, the Interstate Oil and Gas Compact Commission, and the Education Commission of the States. He is also a member of the Republican Governors Association and former chairman of the National Governors Association. Huckabee is chairman of the conservative political action committees Vertical Politics Institute and Huck PAC.

In 2006, Huckabee was initiated as an honorary member of Tau Kappa Epsilon (TKE) Fraternity, motivated in part by his son David being an involved TKE member at Arkansas State University.

In July 2010, Huckabee became a fundraiser on behalf of for-profit Victory University in Memphis, Tennessee, and was designated Chancellor of the Victory University Foundation.

Huckabee was appointed to the Board of Trustees of the Kennedy Center by President Donald Trump in March 2019. His term on the board expired in September 2024.

External videos
- Oral History, Gov. Mike Huckabee talks about the sacrifice his parents made in giving him one of the greatest gifts he ever received, his first electric guitar. Interview date January 24, 2014, NAMM (National Association of Music Merchants) Oral History Library

=== Weight loss and advocacy of good health ===
When he was elected governor of Arkansas, Huckabee was obese. In 2003, physicians diagnosed him with type 2 diabetes, and they also informed him that he would not live more than 10 years if he did not lose weight. Huckabee acknowledges that he has weighed as much as 300 pounds (140 kg). Coupled with the death of former Governor Frank D. White, whose obesity contributed to a fatal heart attack, his diagnosis prompted Huckabee to begin eating healthier and exercising. He lost over 110 pounds (50 kg). The New York Times called the weight loss so rapid that "it was as if he simply unzipped a fat suit and stepped out."

Although Huckabee has stated that he never smoked and he never drank alcohol, he declared himself a "recovering foodaholic." Huckabee has publicly recounted his previous burdens as an obese man: the steps of the Arkansas capitol from the entrance of the building up to the Governor's office were so long and steep that he would be out of breath and exhausted by the time he reached the top of the stairs. Huckabee has discussed his weight loss and used healthcare reform as a major focus of his governorship.

At an August 2007 forum on cancer which was hosted by Lance Armstrong, Huckabee said that he would support the imposition of a federal smoking ban, but since then, he has stated that he believes that the issue is best addressed by state and local governments.

Huckabee has completed several marathons: the 2005 Marine Corps Marathon, the 2005 and 2006 Little Rock Marathon, and the 2006 New York City Marathon. The 2005 Little Rock Marathon featured an impromptu challenge between Huckabee and Iowa Governor Tom Vilsack. Huckabee completed the marathon in 4:38:31, defeating Vilsack by 50 minutes. He wrote a book chronicling his weight-loss experience, Quit Digging Your Grave with a Knife and Fork. Huckabee was one of 10 recipients of a 2006 AARP Impact Award acknowledging his work as a "health crusader."

In 2009, Huckabee acknowledged that he had gained back a quarter of his weight due to a foot condition that prevented him from running.

== Bibliography ==
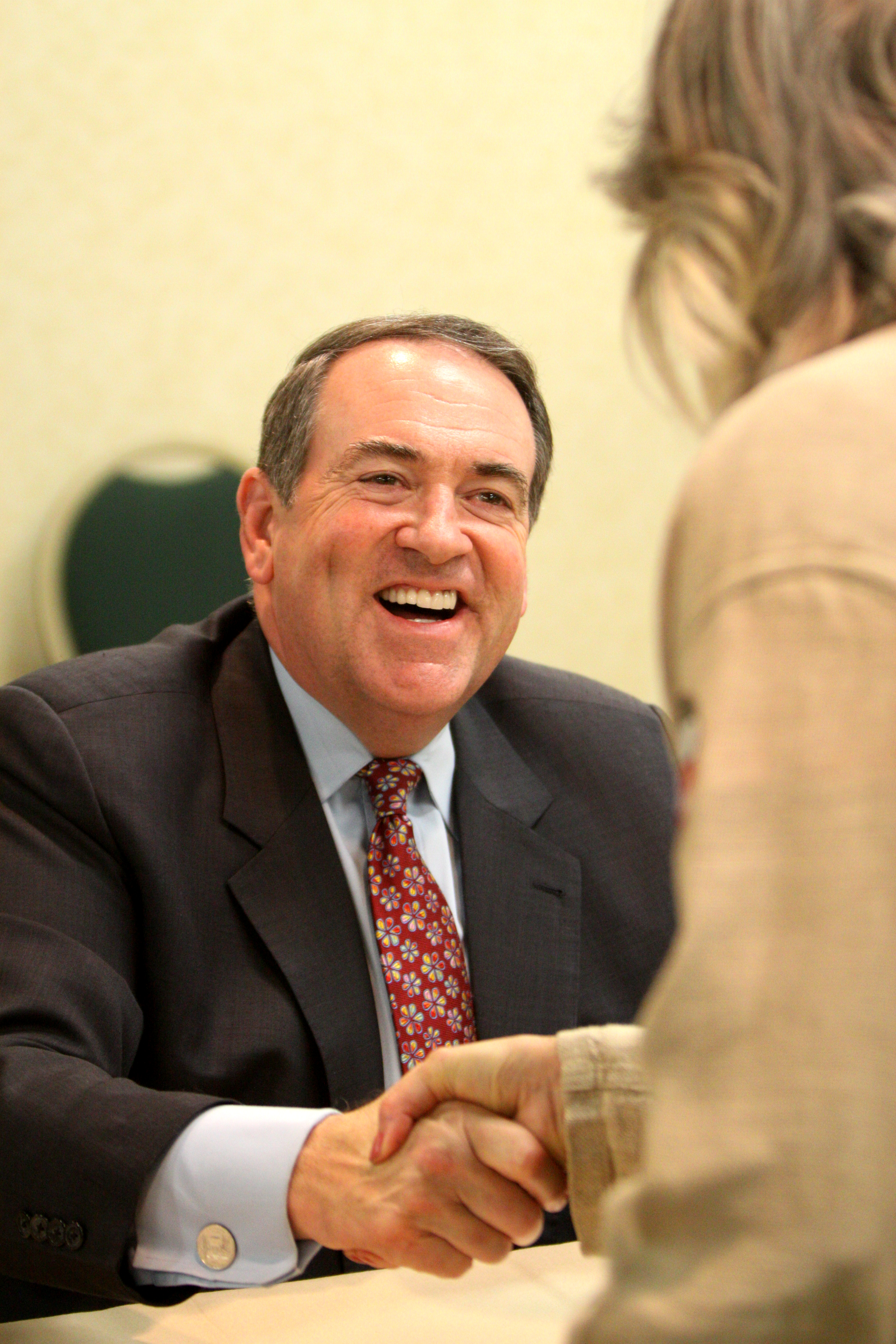
At a book signing in 2011

Huckabee has written or co-authored several books including Do The Right Thing: Inside the Movement That's Bringing Common Sense Back to America (released on November 18, 2008) which became a New York Times Best Seller, Quit Digging Your Grave with a Knife and Fork and God, Guns, Grits, and Gravy.

- ——— (1997). Character is the issue : how people with integrity can revolutionize America. Nashville, Tenn: Broadman & Holman Publishers. ISBN 0-8054-6367-4. OCLC 37369167. a memoir (inspired by the crisis surrounding the incidents prior to his taking office as governor)
- ———; Grant, G. (1998). Kids Who Kill. B&H Publishing Group. ISBN 978-1-4336-6992-7. a book about juvenile violence (inspired by the 1998 Westside Middle School shooting, which took place during his tenure as governor)
- ——— (2000). Living Beyond Your Lifetime: How to be Intentional about the Legacy You Leave. Broadman & Holman. ISBN 978-0-8054-2336-5. a guide for leaving a personal legacy
- ——— (2005). Quit Digging Your Grave with a Knife and Fork: A 12-Stop Program to End Bad Habits and Begin a Healthy Lifestyle. Center Street. ISBN 978-0-446-57806-6. a health and exercise inspirational guide (based on his personal health experience)
- ——— (2007). From Hope to Higher Ground: 12 STOPs to Restoring America's Greatness. Center Street. ISBN 978-1-59995-110-2.
- "De-Marketing Obesity" in the California Management Review (with Brian Wansink), 47:4 (Summer 2005), 6–18.
- Foreword to My Story Your Story His Story (2006) by Larry Toller
- Foreword for "With Christ in Voting Booth" by David Shedlock
- ———; Perry, J. (2007). Character Makes a Difference: Where I'm From, where I've Been, what I Believe. Broadman & Holman. ISBN 978-0-8054-4677-7.
- ——— (2008). Do the Right Thing: Inside the Movement That's Bringing Common Sense Back to America. New York Times best sellers. Sentinel. ISBN 978-1-59523-054-6.
- ——— (2009). A Simple Christmas: Twelve Stories that Celebrate the True Holiday Spirit. Sentinel. ISBN 978-1-59523-062-1.
- ——— (2011). A Simple Government: Twelve Things We Really Need from Washington (and a Trillion That We Don't!). Penguin Publishing Group. ISBN 978-1-101-47583-6.
- ——— (2012). Dear Chandler, Dear Scarlett: A Grandfather's Thoughts on Faith, Family, and the Things That Matter Most. Penguin. ISBN 978-1-101-60169-3.
- ——— (2015). God, Guns, Grits, and Gravy. St. Martin's Publishing Group. ISBN 978-1-4668-6671-3. Huckabee discusses the myriad differences he's seen between those who live in the blue, coastal "bubbles" and the "bubbas" of the red flyover states. Huckabee uses Jay-Z and Beyoncé as examples of a "culture of crude". He describes Beyoncé's lyrics as "obnoxious and toxic mental poison".

== See also ==
- List of governors of Arkansas
- Electoral history of Mike Huckabee
- 2016 Republican Party presidential candidates
- Public image of Mike Huckabee

Party political offices
Preceded by Asa Hutchinson	Republican nominee for U.S. Senator from Arkansas (Class 3); 1992	Succeeded by Fay Boozman
Preceded by Kenneth Harris	Republican nominee for Lieutenant Governor of Arkansas; 1993, 1994	Succeeded by Win Rockefeller
Vacant Title last held by Ed Bethune; 1984	Republican nominee for U.S. Senator from Arkansas (Class 3); Withdrew; 1996	Succeeded by Tim Hutchinson
Preceded by Sheffield Nelson	Republican nominee for Governor of Arkansas; 1998, 2002	Succeeded by Asa Hutchinson
Political offices
Preceded by Jim Tucker	Lieutenant Governor of Arkansas; 1993–1996	Succeeded by Win Rockefeller
Preceded by Jim Tucker	Governor of Arkansas; 1996–2007	Succeeded by Mike Beebe
Preceded by Mark Warner	Chair of the National Governors Association; 2005–2006	Succeeded by Janet Napolitano
Diplomatic posts
Preceded by Jack Lew	United States Ambassador to Israel; 2025–present	Incumbent
U.S. order of precedence (ceremonial)
Preceded by Martha McSally as Former U.S. Senator	Order of precedence of the United States; Within Arkansas	Succeeded by Mike Beebe as Former Governor
Preceded by Mike Parson as Former Governor	Order of precedence of the United States; Outside Arkansas	Succeeded by Mike Beebe as Former Governor
Preceded by Kamala Harris as Former Vice President	Order of precedence of the United States; At Post (within Israel)	Succeeded by Marco Rubio as Secretary of State
