= Charlie Cole Chaffin =

American politician (born 1938)

Charlie Francis Cole Chaffin (born September 13, 1938) is an American teacher and former politician in Arkansas. She is a Democrat.

== Early life ==
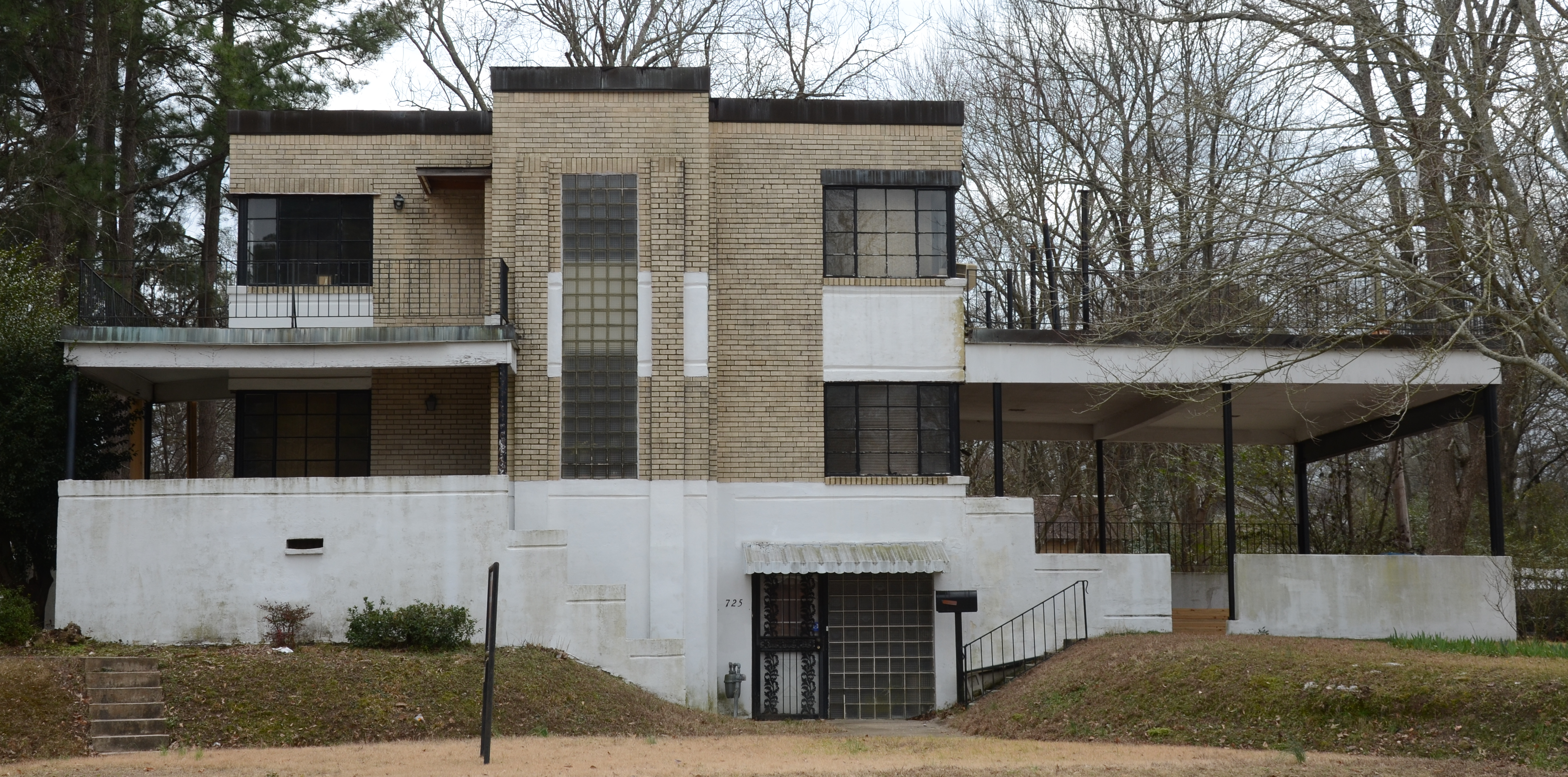
The Billings-Cole House where Chaffin grew up

Chaffin was born Charlie Francis Cole on September 13, 1938, in Little Rock, Arkansas. Her mother, Grace Francis "Frank" Cole, was a nurse anesthetist and her father, John Walton Cole, was a fourth-generation physician.

Her family was very politically active. Her grandfather, Charles F. Cole, was a member of the Grant County Quorum Court, her uncle, Ed F. McDonald, served as the Arkansas Secretary of State and a candidate for governor and her uncle, Jim Cole, was a state legislator. Her father was a member of the Grant County Democratic Central Committee and the Arkansas Board of Education, her mother was involved in civil rights and marched with Martin Luther King Jr. and her brother, John Cole, was a prosecutor and district judge.

Chaffin grew up in Sheridan, Arkansas, and Malvern, Arkansas, where she attended public schools. She graduated from Malvern High School in 1956. She married Sam L. Chaffin in 1958 and the couple had three children.

Chaffin moved to Fayetteville to attend the University of Arkansas. While studying, she was a member of the Zeta Tau Alpha sorority and the Alpha Lambda Delta and Kappa Delta Pi honor societies. She graduated in 1960 with a bachelor's in secondary education and in 1964 with a masters' in education. She also took graduate courses in curriculum specialist program. She worked at Bryant High School from 1970 to 1981 as a chemistry and physical science teacher, alongside lecturing part-time at the University of Arkansas at Little Rock from 1977 to 1990. She was awarded as an outstanding chemistry teacher by the southwest region of the American Chemical Society.

== Political career ==
She was elected as a delegate to the 1979–1980 Arkansas Constitutional Convention, beating out six opponents including Senator Virgil Fletcher. She was the chair of the Science and Technology Committee and a member of the Finance and Taxation Committee. Chaffin said later that she chose these committee assignments because she wanted to get involved in areas that were not associated with traditional women's issues. She was one of thirteen women out of a hundred members who attended the convention. She joined the Education Standards Committee in 1983, which was chaired by Hillary Rodham Clinton.

Chaffin was first elected to the Arkansas Senate as the senator for District 16 in the 1984 special election following the death of James Teague. She ran against four opponents in the Democratic primary and won the runoff against Wayne Bishop to become the Democratic nominee. She received 69.34 percent of the vote in the general election, beating Republican Norha Stewart. She was sworn in on November 20, 1984, by her brother.

She was only the third woman to serve in the state senate and in four legislative sessions, she was the only woman until Senator Gladys Watson was elected in 1989. During the 75th General Assembly, she was a member of the member of the Senate Education Committee. She was also a member of the city, county and local affairs committee.

In 1992, she was appointed as deputy president pro tempore and a member of the Capitol Arts Commission.

Chaffin ran against Mike Huckabee in the 1994 lieutenant governor race. She won the Democratic nomination but ultimately lost the general election.

== Later life ==
Chaffin later joined the Arkansas School for Mathematics, Sciences, and the Arts in 1997 as a chemistry teacher.
