= 1996 United States Senate election in Arkansas =

- November 5, 1996
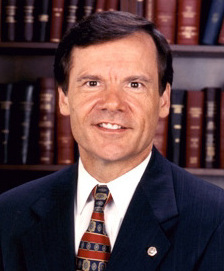

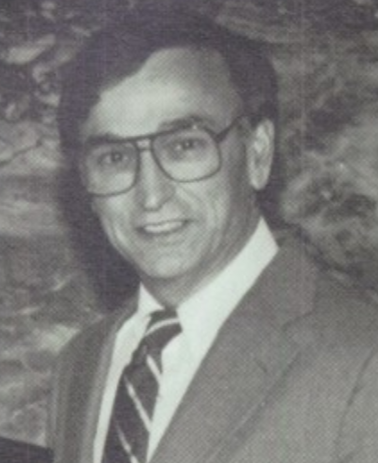
Nominee	Tim Hutchinson (replacing Mike Huckabee)	Winston Bryant
Party	Republican	Democratic
Popular vote	445,942	400,241
Percentage	52.70%	47.30%
- County results Hutchinson: 50–60% 60–70% 70–80% Bryant: 50–60% 60–70% 70–80%
U.S. senator before election
David Pryor
Democratic
Elected U.S. Senator
Tim Hutchinson
Republican

The 1996 United States Senate election in Arkansas was held on November 5, 1996. Incumbent Democratic U.S. Senator David Pryor decided to retire. Republican Mike Huckabee initially ran for the open seat and won the Republican primary. However, he withdrew after taking the governorship and was subsequently replaced by Tim Hutchinson. Hutchinson went on to win the general election, becoming the first Republican to win a U.S. Senate seat in Arkansas since Reconstruction in 1872 and the first Republican to ever be popularly elected in the state. Hutchinson would later lose re-election in 2002 to David Pryor's son Mark.

In the concurrent presidential election in Arkansas, Democrat Bill Clinton — a native Arkansan who had previously served as governor — defeated Republican Bob Dole. To date, this is the last time that Republicans flipped a Senate seat in a presidential election year despite losing the state in the concurrent presidential election.

== Democratic primary ==
=== Candidates ===
- Bill Bristow, attorney
- Winston Bryant, Arkansas Attorney General
- Lu Hardin, state senator
- Sandy McMath, attorney and son of former governor Sidney Sanders McMath
- Kevin Smith, state senator

==== Withdrew ====
- Jay Bradford, state senator from Pine Bluff, Senate Majority Whip, and Democratic nominee for U.S. representative in 1994 (endorsed Bryant)
- Pat Hays, mayor of North Little Rock (endorsed Bryant)

==== Declined ====
- Mike Beebe, then a state senator in the Arkansas General Assembly and a future governor; explored a bid but didn't announce
- Mack McLarty, 17th White House Chief of Staff (endorsed McMath)
- Lamar Pettus, associate justice of the Supreme Court of Arkansas (ran for chief justice of the Arkansas Supreme Court)

Arkansas Attorney General Winston Bryant and Arkansas State Senator Lu Hardin finished in the top two in the primary, and Bryant narrowly defeated Hardin in the runoff.

=== Primary results ===
Democratic primary results
Party	Candidate	Votes	%
Democratic	Winston Bryant	129,328	39.99%
Democratic	Lu Hardin	71,889	22.23%
Democratic	Bill Bristow	58,093	17.96%
Democratic	Sandy McMath	42,303	13.08%
Democratic	Kevin Smith	21,774	6.74%

=== Runoff results ===
Democratic runoff
Party	Candidate	Votes	%
Democratic	Winston Bryant	87,564	52.44%
Democratic	Lu Hardin	79,411	47.56%

== Republican primary ==
=== Candidates ===
- Mike Huckabee, lieutenant governor of Arkansas

=== Results ===
Huckabee was unopposed for the nomination.

=== Huckabee withdrawal ===
Although Huckabee won the Senate nomination unopposed in the May primary, he abandoned his Senate bid when Governor Jim Guy Tucker resigned from office and he became governor of Arkansas.

=== Replacement selection ===
Following Huckabee's withdrawal, several candidates announced their interest in running:

- John E. Brown, state senator from Siloam Springs
- Jay Dickey, U.S. representative from Pine Bluff
- Tim Hutchinson, U.S. representative from Fort Smith
- Julia Hughes Jones, former Arkansas State Auditor (1980—1994)

The main candidates were Dickey and Hutchinson, but in light of a potential impasse, some compromise candidates were floated:

- Ed Bethune, former U.S. representative from Searcy and nominee for Senate in 1984
- Steve Luelf, former state senator and candidate for governor in 1994
- Sheffield Nelson, chair of the Arkansas Republican Party and gubernatorial nominee in 1990 and 1994
- Tommy F. Robinson, former U.S. representative and candidate for governor in 1990
- Frank D. White, former governor of Arkansas (1980–1982)

On June 11, White, Nelson, and Bethune all endorsed Hutchinson. Shortly thereafter, Jones and Dickey withdrew and endorsed Hutchinson. Brown also withdrew his candidacy to seek Hutchinson's open House seat, which he lost to Hutchinson's younger brother Asa Hutchinson in a special convention. Hutchinson was ratified as the nominee by the Arkansas Republican State Committee.

== Results ==
Hutchinson won election to the U.S. Senate, receiving just over 5% more of the vote than his opponent Bryant. This was despite incumbent U.S. President Bill Clinton being re-elected by a 17-point margin in his home state of Arkansas, though the state had begun to trend more Republican at the time.

1996 United States Senate election in Arkansas
Party	Candidate	Votes	%
Republican	Tim Hutchinson	445,942	52.70%
Democratic	Winston Bryant	400,241	47.30%
Total votes		846,183	100.0%
Republican gain from Democratic			

== See also ==
- 1996 United States Senate elections
