= U.S. Term Limits, Inc. v. Thornton =

- Supreme Court of the United States

Argued November 29, 1994 Decided May 22, 1995
- Full case name: U.S. Term Limits, Incorporated, et al., Petitioners v. Ray Thornton, et al.; Winston Bryant, Attorney General of Arkansas, Petitioner v. Bobbie E. Hill, et al.
- Citations: 514 U.S. 779 (more) 115 S. Ct. 1842; 131 L. Ed. 2d 881; 1995 U.S. LEXIS 3487; 63 U.S.L.W. 4413; 95 Cal. Daily Op. Service 3790; 95 Daily Journal DAR 6496; 9 Fla. L. Weekly Fed. S 29

Case history
- Prior: U.S. Term Limits, Inc. v. Hill, 316 Ark. 251, 872 S.W.2d 349 (1994); cert. granted, 512 U.S. 1218 (1994).

Holding
- States cannot impose qualifications for prospective members of Congress stricter than those in the Constitution.

Court membership
- Chief Justice William Rehnquist Associate Justices John P. Stevens · Sandra Day O'Connor; Antonin Scalia · Anthony Kennedy; David Souter · Clarence Thomas; Ruth Bader Ginsburg · Stephen Breyer

Case opinions
- Majority: Stevens, joined by Kennedy, Souter, Ginsburg, Breyer
- Concurrence: Kennedy
- Dissent: Thomas, joined by Rehnquist, O'Connor, Scalia

Laws applied
- U.S. Const. art. I, § 4, cl. 1, as modified by U.S. Const. amend. XVII; U.S. Const. amend. X

U.S. Term Limits, Inc. v. Thornton, 514 U.S. 779 (1995), is a landmark U.S. Supreme Court decision in which the Court ruled that states cannot impose qualifications for prospective members of the U.S. Congress stricter than those that the Constitution specifies. The decision invalidated 23 states' Congressional term limit provisions. The parties to the case were U.S. Term Limits, a nonprofit advocacy group, and Arkansas politician Ray Thornton, among others.

== Background ==
In 1992, voters in Arkansas voted on a ballot initiative to add Amendment 73 to the Arkansas Constitution prohibiting ballot access to any Congressional candidate seeking reelection who had already served three terms in the U.S. House or two terms in the U.S. Senate, but it permitted any candidate to run for reelection as a write-in candidate.

Soon after the amendment's adoption by ballot measure at the general election on November 3, 1992, Bobbie Hill, a member of the League of Women Voters, together with Representative Ray Thornton, sued Arkansas, arguing that the amendment amounted to an unwarranted expansion of the qualifications for membership in Congress enumerated in the U.S. Constitution:

No Person shall be a Representative who shall not have attained to the Age of twenty-five Years, and been seven Years a Citizen of the United States, and who shall not, when elected, be an Inhabitant of that State in which he shall be chosen (Article I, section 2),

and:

No Person shall be a Senator who shall not have attained to the Age of thirty Years, and been nine Years a Citizen of the United States, and who shall not, when elected, be an Inhabitant of that State for which he shall be chosen (Article I, section 3).

They also argued that it went against the 17th Amendment, which transferred the power of selecting U.S. senators from the state legislature to the people of the state:

The Senate of the United States shall be composed of two Senators from each State, elected by the people thereof, for six years; and each Senator shall have one vote. The electors in each State shall have the qualifications requisite for electors of the most numerous branch of the State legislatures.

U.S. Term Limits claimed that Amendment 73 was "a permissible exercise of state power under the Elections Clause".

Both the trial court and the Arkansas Supreme Court ruled in favor of Hill, declaring Amendment 73 unconstitutional.

== Supreme Court decision ==
The Supreme Court affirmed by a 5–4 vote. The majority and minority articulated different views of the character of the federal structure established in the Constitution. Writing for the majority, Justice John Paul Stevens concluded:

Finally, state-imposed restrictions, unlike the congressionally imposed restrictions at issue in Powell, violate a third idea central to this basic principle: that the right to choose representatives belongs not to the States, but to the people. ... Following the adoption of the 17th Amendment in 1913, this ideal was extended to elections for the Senate. The Congress of the United States, therefore, is not a confederation of nations in which separate sovereigns are represented by appointed delegates, but is instead a body composed of representatives of the people.

He further ruled that sustaining Amendment 73 would result in "a patchwork of state qualifications" for U.S. representatives, and called that consequence inconsistent with "the uniformity and national character that the framers sought to ensure." Concurring, Justice Anthony Kennedy wrote that the amendment interfered with the "relationship between the people of the Nation and their National Government."

Justice Clarence Thomas, in dissent, countered:

It is ironic that the Court bases today's decision on the right of the people to "choose whom they please to govern them." Under our Constitution, there is only one State whose people have the right to "choose whom they please" to represent Arkansas in Congress ... Nothing in the Constitution deprives the people of each State of the power to prescribe eligibility requirements for the candidates who seek to represent them in Congress. The Constitution is simply silent on this question. And where the Constitution is silent, it raises no bar to action by the States or the people.

He also noted that the amendment did not actually prevent anyone from election since it only prevents prospective fourth-termers from being printed on the ballot, not from being written in, and therefore did not overstep the qualifications clause of the federal Constitution.

== See also ==
- Powell v. McCormack (1969)
- List of United States Supreme Court cases
- Lists of United States Supreme Court cases by volume
- List of United States Supreme Court cases by the Rehnquist Court
- Term limits in the United States
- Twenty-second Amendment to the United States Constitution
