= Richard Mays =

American politician and judge from Arkansas (born 1943)

Member of the Arkansas House of Representatives
- In office 1973–1977

Associate Justice of the Arkansas Supreme Court
- In office 1979–1980
- Preceded by: Conley Byrd
- Succeeded by: Robert H. Dudley

Personal details
- Born: August 5, 1943 (age 82) Little Rock, Arkansas, US
- Party: Democratic
- Education: Howard University, University of Arkansas School of Law
- Occupation: Politician, judge, lawyer, businessman

Richard Leon Mays Sr. (born August 5, 1943) is an American retired politician, judge, lawyer, and businessman from the U.S. state of Arkansas. Elected to the Arkansas House of Representatives in 1972, he was one of the first three African Americans to serve in the Arkansas General Assembly since the Reconstruction era. Governor Bill Clinton appointed Mays to the Arkansas Supreme Court in 1980.

== Early life and education ==
Mays was born on August 5, 1943, in Little Rock, Arkansas, the younger son of Barnett George Mays and Dorothy Mae (Greenlee) Mays. His father owned and operated a restaurant and liquor store in North Little Rock. Richard Mays graduated from Horace Mann High School in 1961 and received his bachelor's degree from Howard University in 1965. He received his law degree in 1968 from the University of Arkansas School of Law, from which he was the first African American to graduate in over a decade.

After graduation, Mays worked as a U.S. Justice Department trial attorney before returning to Little Rock a year later as a deputy prosecutor. He was the first African American prosecutor for the 6th Circuit Court in Pulaski County and perhaps the first Black prosecutor in Arkansas history. In 1971, he entered private practice with Walker, Kaplan, and Lavey, the first racially integrated law firm in Arkansas.

== Political and judicial career ==
In 1972, Mays ran for a heavily Democratic seat in the U.S. House of Representatives, losing the primary election to Arkansas Attorney General Ray Thornton. The same year, Mays ran for a Black-majority seat in the Arkansas House of Representatives, won the election, and served from 1973 to 1977. He co-founded the law firm of Mays, Byrd & Associates. In December 1979, Governor Bill Clinton appointed Mays to the Arkansas Supreme Court to fill out the unexpired term of Justice Conley Byrd, who retired due to ill health. Mays served on the bench until January 1981. He worked full-time for Clinton's 1992 presidential campaign and co-chaired the Clinton-Gore presidential inauguration committee, raising more than $1 million. He also worked as a lobbyist and business consultant, facilitating a CMS Energy contract to build a power plant in Ghana.

Mays has served on numerous state boards and commissions, including the Arkansas Ethics Commission, the Economic Development Commission, the Governor's Mansion Commission, the Bank Board, and the Claims Commission, which he served as vice chair and then as chair from 2005 to 2015. At the national level, he served on the U.S. South African Business Development Committee and on the board of the American Judicature Society. In 2013, he became chair of the board of directors of Soul of the South Television, a Black regional TV network. He was an Arkansas Civil Rights Heritage Trail honoree in 2015 and an Arkansas Black Hall of Fame inductee in 2016. He has also taught law at the University of Arkansas School of Law.

== Personal life ==
Mays married Jennifer Winstead, whom he had dated in high school. They had two children, Tiffany and Richard Mays Jr., who both eventually became partners in their father's law firm. Mays's first wife died in 2000, and he married Thai-American business executive Supha Xayprasith in 2012. She ran for the Democratic gubernatorial nomination in 2022 but was eliminated in the primary election, garnering only 4.3% of the vote statewide.

Political offices
Preceded by Conley Byrd	Justice of the Arkansas Supreme Court; 1979–1980	Succeeded by Robert H. Dudley
