= Justice Dudley =

Justice Dudley may refer to:

- John Dudley (judge) (1725–1805), associate justice of the New Hampshire Supreme Court
- Robert H. Dudley (born 1933), associate justice of the Arkansas Supreme Court
