= Conley Byrd =

American judge (1925–2014)

Conley F Byrd Sr. (January 14, 1925 – July 19, 2014) was a justice of the Arkansas Supreme Court from 1967 to 1980.

Born in Poughkeepsie, Arkansas, Byrd began picking cotton when he was six years old, on his family's farm. After graduating from high school in 1943, he joined the U.S. Navy, serving in the South Pacific Theatre in World War II, primarily on the destroyer escort USS Harold C. Thomas (DE-21).

Byrd attended Arkansas State College and Arkansas State Teachers College before receiving his law degree from the University of Arkansas School of Law in 1950.

Byrd served on the Arkansas Supreme Court for thirteen years, announcing his impending retirement towards the end of 1979 due to health problems.

Political offices
Preceded by Hugh M. Bland	Justice of the Arkansas Supreme Court; 1967–1980	Succeeded by Richard Mays
