= Mary Stallcup =

Arkansas Attorney General (1990–1991)

Mary Stallcup (June 21, 1954 – May 17, 1997) was a lawyer who served as Acting Attorney General of Arkansas from December 1990 to January 1991. She was the first woman to hold the office. She was a Democrat. She was appointed by Arkansas governor Bill Clinton and succeeded Ron Fields after his resignation. She was succeeded by Winston Bryant, who won election to the office, January 15, 1991. She was born in Omaha, Nebraska.

== See also ==
- Leslie Rutledge, the second woman to serve as Attorney General of Arkansas and the first elected to the office
