= Joe Purcell =

13th Lieutenant Governor of Arkansas

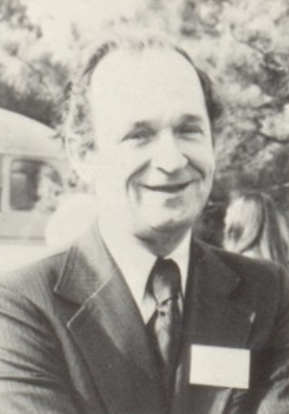

Acting Governor of Arkansas
- In office January 3, 1979 – January 9, 1979
- Preceded by: David Pryor
- Succeeded by: Bill Clinton

13th Lieutenant Governor of Arkansas
- In office January 14, 1975 – January 19, 1981
- Governor: David Pryor; Bill Clinton
- Preceded by: Bob C. Riley
- Succeeded by: Winston Bryant

45th Attorney General of Arkansas
- In office January 10, 1967 – January 12, 1971
- Governor: Winthrop Rockefeller
- Preceded by: Bruce Bennett
- Succeeded by: Ray Thornton

Chair of the Arkansas Democratic Party
- In office January 5, 1971 – January 12, 1975

Personal details
- Born: Joe Edward Purcell; July 29, 1923 Warren, Arkansas, U.S.
- Died: March 5, 1987 (aged 63) Benton, Arkansas, U.S.
- Party: Democratic
- Spouse: Helen Hale Purcell
- Children: 2
- Profession: Attorney

Joe Edward Purcell (July 29, 1923 – March 5, 1987) was an American politician and attorney who served as the acting governor of Arkansas for six days in 1979. A member of the Democratic Party, he served as the 45th attorney general of Arkansas from 1967 to 1971 and the 13th lieutenant governor of Arkansas from 1975 to 1981.

In 1974, Purcell was elected to the lieutenant governorship; he handily defeated Republican Leona Troxell of Rose Bud in White County, a former associate of the late Governor Winthrop Rockefeller. He was reelected as Arkansas Lieutenant Governor in 1976 and 1978 under David Pryor and Bill Clinton. He served as Acting Arkansas Governor for six days in 1979, having filled the unexpired term of Pryor, who had been elected to the United States Senate.

Purcell was twice a candidate for the governorship. In 1970, he was considered the leading challenger to former governor Orval Faubus and ran second to Faubus throughout the primary race, but was edged out of a runoff berth by less than 500 votes by Charleston attorney Dale Bumpers, who went on to defeat Faubus and then Republican Governor Winthrop Rockefeller in the general election. Purcell was Bumpers' choice to chair the Arkansas Democratic Party, a position which he held from 1970 to 1973. His chief task as party chair was to purge followers of presidential candidate George Wallace of Alabama and former gubernatorial nominee James D. Johnson from the party ranks and to limit the influence of the Faubus-era "Old Guard" faction. He entered the Democratic gubernatorial primary in 1982 and surprisingly edged out former congressman Jim Guy Tucker for a runoff berth with former governor Bill Clinton. Purcell lost the Democratic nomination to Clinton in a runoff, 46 to 54 percent.

== Notes and references ==
Party political offices
Preceded by Bob C. Riley	Democratic nominee for Lieutenant Governor of Arkansas; 1974, 1976, 1978	Succeeded by Winston Bryant
Political offices
Preceded by David Pryor; Governor	Governor of Arkansas; Acting; January 1979	Succeeded by Bill Clinton; Governor
Preceded by Bob C. Riley	Lieutenant Governor of Arkansas; 1975–1981	Succeeded by Winston Bryant
Legal offices
Preceded by Bruce Bennett	Attorney General of Arkansas; 1967–1971	Succeeded by Ray Thornton
