= David Pryor =

American politician (1934–2024)

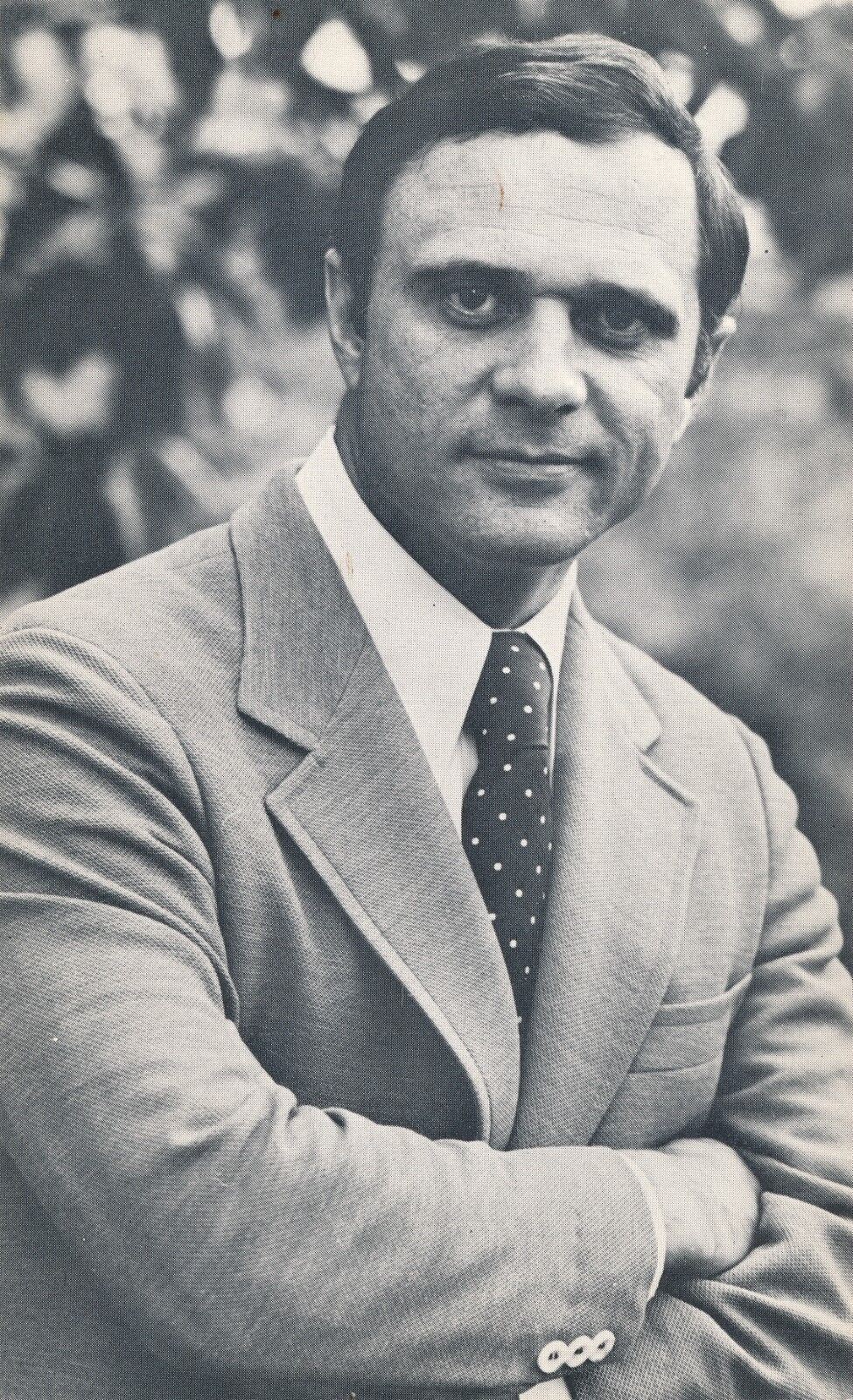
- Pryor in 1974

Chair of the Arkansas Democratic Party
- In office September 5, 2008 – January 28, 2009
- Preceded by: Bill Gwatney
- Succeeded by: Todd Turner

Secretary of the Senate Democratic Caucus
- In office January 3, 1989 – January 3, 1995
- Leader: George J. Mitchell
- Preceded by: Daniel Inouye
- Succeeded by: Barbara Mikulski

Chair of the Senate Aging Committee
- In office January 3, 1989 – January 3, 1995
- Preceded by: John Melcher
- Succeeded by: William Cohen

United States Senator from Arkansas
- In office January 3, 1979 – January 3, 1997
- Preceded by: Kaneaster Hodges Jr.
- Succeeded by: Tim Hutchinson

39th Governor of Arkansas
- In office January 14, 1975 – January 3, 1979
- Lieutenant: Joe Purcell
- Preceded by: Bob C. Riley (acting)
- Succeeded by: Joe Purcell (acting)

Member of the U.S. House of Representatives from Arkansas's 4th district
- In office November 8, 1966 – January 3, 1973
- Preceded by: Oren Harris
- Succeeded by: Ray Thornton

Member of the Arkansas House of Representatives from the Ouachita County district
- In office January 9, 1961 – November 7, 1966
- Preceded by: William Andrews
- Succeeded by: Redistricted

Personal details
- Born: David Hampton Pryor; August 29, 1934 Camden, Arkansas, U.S.
- Died: April 20, 2024 (aged 89) Little Rock, Arkansas, U.S.
- Resting place: Mount Holly Cemetery, Little Rock, Arkansas
- Party: Democratic
- Spouse: Barbara Lunsford (m. 1957)
- Children: Mark
- Education: Henderson State University (BA); University of Arkansas, Fayetteville (LLB)

David Hampton Pryor (August 29, 1934 – April 20, 2024) was an American politician who served as a representative for Arkansas's 4th congressional district from 1966 until 1973 and as a senator from Arkansas from 1979 until 1997. A member of the Democratic Party, Pryor also served as the 39th governor of Arkansas from 1975 to 1979 and was a member of the Arkansas House of Representatives from 1960 to 1966. He served as the acting chairman of the Arkansas Democratic Party from 2008 to 2009, following Bill Gwatney's assassination.

== Early life ==
David Hampton Pryor was born in Camden, the seat of Ouachita County in southern Arkansas, to William Edgar Pryor and the former Susan Pryor (née Newton). Both had deep roots in Arkansas; the marriage 'united two of the pioneer families of Arkansas'. William Pryor moved to Camden from Holly Springs in 1923 and started selling cars. By 1933, he had bought the partners out of the business and become sole owner of Edgar Pryor Inc, a well-known Chevrolet dealership in the area. The family was also involved in the civic, religious, and political life of Camden, with W.E. serving as Ouachita County Sheriff from 1939 to 1942.

Pryor was a third generation Ouachita County resident. He attended public schools in Camden, attended Henderson State Teacher's College in Arkadelphia, and graduated from the University of Arkansas in Fayetteville in 1957. Pryor was founder and publisher of the Ouachita Citizen from 1957 to 1960. He graduated from law school at the University of Arkansas in 1964 and was admitted to the bar that same year.

== Political career ==
Pryor first won elected office representing Ouachita County in the Arkansas House of Representatives in 1960. He challenged and defeated the incumbent, William S. Andrews, the grandfather of State Representative Wade Andrews. Pryor was seated as a member of the 63rd Arkansas General Assembly, Pryor would win reelection to the seat in 1962 and 1964.

In 1966, Pryor was elected to Congress following a vacancy that year after U.S. President Lyndon B. Johnson appointed fellow Democrat Oren Harris to a federal judgeship. He was not a candidate for reelection in 1972, instead challenging longtime U.S. Senator John L. McLellan in the Democratic Primary. Pryor lost to McLellan in a runoff by less than 20,000 votes.

Pryor entered the 1974 Democratic Gubernatorial Primary when Governor Dale Bumpers declined a third term to successfully challenge Senator J. William Fulbright. Pryor narrowly avoided a runoff in the primary, defeating former governor Orval Faubus and Lt. Governor Bob C. Riley, then easily besting Arkansas Republican Party Executive Director Ken Coon in the General Election. Pryor was reelected in 1976, gaining 66 percent of the vote in the Democratic Primary against former Razorback football great Jim Lindsey, and 86 percent in November against a token Republican. He served as Governor of Arkansas from January 14, 1975 to January 3, 1979. Navigating a difficult economy from the 1974–76 recession, Pryor appointed banker and future governor Frank D. White as his economic development director.

He declined a third term in order to seek McLellan's former seat in 1978 (the senator died in 1977) and faced two congressmen: Jim Guy Tucker and Ray Thornton in the Democratic Primary. Pryor advanced to a runoff with Tucker, and defeated the central Arkansas congressman by 12 points. He defeated a Republican and Independent opponents in the General Election with 76 percent of the vote.

In 1984, in spite of the Ronald Reagan landslide, Pryor defeated central Arkansas Congressman Ed Bethune in a race dominated by national GOP money backing Bethune. In 1990, Pryor defeated a write-in candidate; no other Democrat or Republican filed. He retired in 1996 and was replaced by Republican congressman Tim Hutchinson.

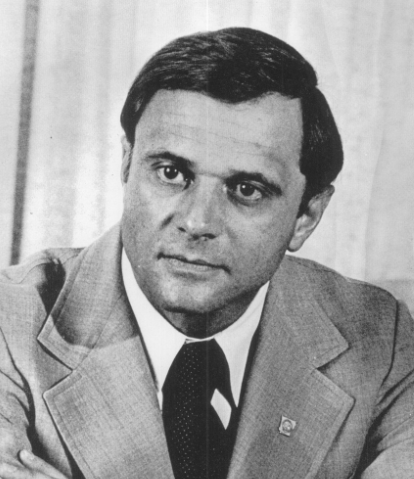
Pryor as governor.

=== U.S. Senate ===
Pryor served as chairman of the Committee on Aging. Pryor was known for his advocacy for the aged and for promoting taxpayer rights. During his tenure, he was secretary of the Democratic Conference, third in the Senate Democratic Leadership.

In 2000, Pryor became Director of the Institute of Politics at Harvard Kennedy School in Cambridge, Massachusetts. He served as dean of the Clinton School of Public Service in Little Rock from 2004 to 2006. In June 2006, President George W. Bush nominated Pryor to the board of the Corporation for Public Broadcasting, and in September of that year he was confirmed by the Senate for a six-year term. As he had done occasionally in the past, Pryor taught a political science course at the University of Arkansas in Fayetteville during the Fall 2008 term.

== Post-Senate career ==
His son is former United States Senator Mark Pryor, a Democrat who held the same seat from 2003 until 2015.

In 2004, Pryor was one of the five-member board of directors of the Clinton Foundation.

Pryor briefly returned to politics, when he served as chairman of the Arkansas Democratic Party following the assassination of Bill Gwatney.

== Personal life ==
In 1957, Pryor married Barbara Jean Lunsford, who at the time was a 19 year old freshman at the University of Arkansas. Unable to tolerate the stresses of public life, she briefly lived away from her family from 1975 to 1977, while her husband was governor. During that time, she took various university courses and had trouble finding a job, and she eventually moved back into the governor's mansion after completing her rest.

Pryor had quadruple bypass surgery performed by Dr. Tamim Antaki at UAMS Medical Center on October 11, 2006. He had suffered a heart attack the previous day. His recovery was satisfactory and he was released from the hospital on October 17, 2006.

On July 13, 2020, Arkansas Governor Asa Hutchinson announced at a press briefing about the COVID-19 pandemic in the state that Pryor and his wife Barbara tested positive for the disease with Pryor hospitalized at UAMS in Little Rock and his wife under home quarantine.

Pryor died at his home in Little Rock, on April 20, 2024, at the age of 89. He would lie in state at the Arkansas State Capitol on April 26, 2024. His funeral would then be held at Second Presbyterian Church in Little Rock on April 27, 2024, with Bill Clinton being among those in attendance. He would be buried at Mount Holly Cemetery in Little Rock.

== Sources ==
- Ferguson, John L. (1965). Arkansas Lives. Hopkinsville, Kentucky: Historical Record Association, Inc. pp. 506–507. LCCN 65-25764.
- Priest, Sharon (1998). Runnells, Jonathan (ed.). Historical Report of the Arkansas Secretary of State. Office of the Arkansas Secretary of State. ISBN 9780313302121. OCLC 40157815.

U.S. House of Representatives
Preceded by Oren Harris	Member of the U.S. House of Representatives from Arkansas's 4th congressional district 1966–1973	Succeeded by Ray Thornton
Party political offices
Preceded by Dale Bumpers	Democratic nominee for Governor of Arkansas; 1974, 1976	Succeeded by Bill Clinton
Preceded by John McClellan	Democratic nominee for U.S. Senator from Arkansas (Class 2); 1978, 1984, 1990	Succeeded by Winston Bryant
Preceded by Daniel Inouye	Secretary of the Senate Democratic Conference; 1989–1995	Succeeded by Barbara Mikulski
Preceded by Bill Gwatney	Chair of the Arkansas Democratic Party; 2008–2009	Succeeded by Todd Turner
Political offices
Preceded by Bob C. Riley; Acting	Governor of Arkansas; 1975–1979	Succeeded by Joe Purcell; Acting
U.S. Senate
Preceded by Kaneaster Hodges Jr.	U.S. Senator (Class 2) from Arkansas; 1979–1997; Served alongside: Dale Bumpers	Succeeded by Tim Hutchinson
Preceded by John Melcher	Chair of the Senate Aging Committee; 1989–1995	Succeeded by William Cohen
