= 1994 Arkansas gubernatorial election =

- November 8, 1994
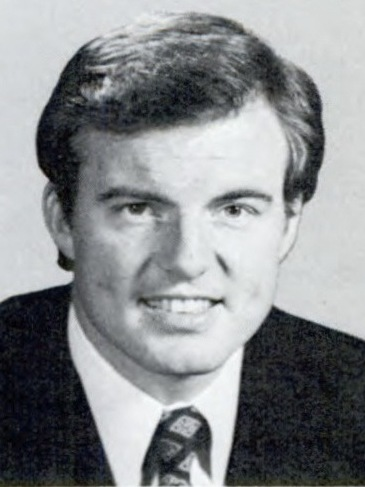

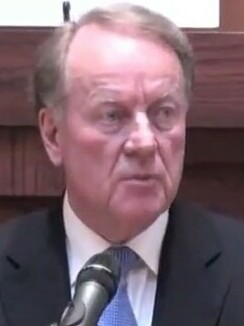
Nominee	Jim Guy Tucker	Sheffield Nelson
Party	Democratic	Republican
Popular vote	428,936	287,904
Percentage	59.84%	40.16%
- County results Tucker: 50–60% 60–70% 70–80% Nelson: 50–60%
Governor before election
Jim Guy Tucker
Democratic
Elected Governor
Jim Guy Tucker
Democratic

The 1994 Arkansas gubernatorial election took place on November 8, 1994, as a part of the United States gubernatorial elections, 1994.

Incumbent Governor Jim Guy Tucker, who following the resignation of Bill Clinton in 1992 following his election to the presidency, won a full term in a landslide victory despite a national Republican landslide. This would be the last time a Democrat was elected Governor until 2006.

Tucker would resign in the middle of his term following the Whitewater controversy and would be succeeded by Republican Mike Huckabee.

== Democratic nomination ==
Incumbent Democratic governor Jim Guy Tucker assumed the office after his predecessor, Bill Clinton, resigned in December 1992, after being elected President of the United States. Tucker decided to run for a full term. However, less than two years later, Tucker was forced to resign from the governorship due to his involvement in the Whitewater Scandal.

== Republican nomination ==
Candidates

- State Senator Steve Luelf
- Businessman and 1990 nominee for governor Sheffield Nelson
- William L. Jones, Fort Smith Alderman

Primary results (May 17):

- Nelson – 24,054 (50.80%)
- Luelf – 20,953 (44.25%)
- Jones – 2,346 (4.95%)

== General election ==
Although the Republican Party made impressive gains in the 1994 Republican Revolution, winning a majority in the United States Senate, United States House of Representatives, as well as a majority of governorships, Tucker ran as a moderate Democrat and won in a landslide.

- Jim Guy Tucker (D) (inc.) – 428,936 (59.84%)
- Sheffield Nelson (R) – 287,904 (40.16%)
