= Attorney General Bryant =

Attorney General Bryant may refer to:

- Michael Bryant (politician) (born 1966), Attorney General of Ontario
- Winston Bryant (born 1938), Attorney General of Arkansas
