= 1984 United States Senate election in Arkansas =

- November 6, 1984

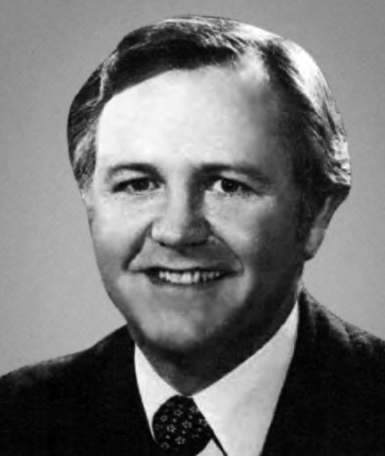
Nominee	David Pryor	Ed Bethune
Party	Democratic	Republican
Popular vote	502,341	373,615
Percentage	57.35%	42.65%
- County results Pryor: 50–60% 60–70% 70–80% Bethune: 50–60% 60–70%
U.S. senator before election
David Pryor
Democratic
Elected U.S. Senator
David Pryor
Democratic

The 1984 United States Senate election in Arkansas was held on November 6, 1984. Incumbent Democratic U.S. Senator David Pryor won re-election to a second term.

== Candidates ==
=== Democratic ===
- David Pryor, incumbent U.S. senator

=== Republican ===
- Ed Bethune, U.S. representative

== Results ==
General election results
Party	Candidate	Votes	%
Democratic	David Pryor (incumbent)	502,341	57.35%
Republican	Ed Bethune	373,615	42.65%
Majority		128,726	14.70%
Turnout		875,956	
Democratic hold			

== See also ==
- 1984 United States Senate elections
