= Bruce Bennett (politician) =

American attorney and politician

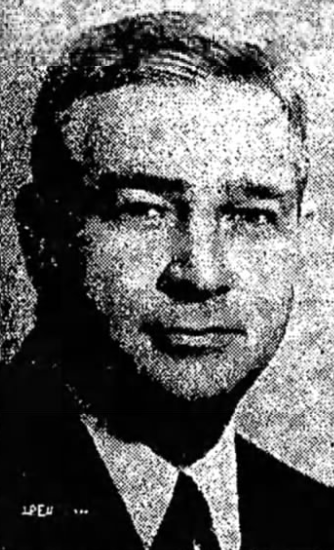
- Bennett in 1956

Attorney General of Arkansas
- In office 1957–1961
- Governor: Orval Faubus
- Preceded by: Tom Gentry
- Succeeded by: J. Frank Holt
- In office 1963–1967
- Governor: Orval Faubus
- Preceded by: Jack Holt Jr.
- Succeeded by: Joe Purcell

Personal details
- Born: October 31, 1917 Helena, Arkansas, U.S.
- Died: August 26, 1979 (aged 61) El Dorado, Arkansas
- Party: Democratic
- Education: Vanderbilt University Law School

Bruce Bennett (October 31, 1917 – August 26, 1979) was an American attorney and politician. He served as attorney general of Arkansas from 1957 to 1961 and again from 1963 to 1967.

== Life and career ==
Bennett was born in Helena, Arkansas. He served in the army during World War II.

Bennett served as attorney general of Arkansas from 1957 to 1961 and again from 1963 to 1967. He sought the Democratic Gubernatorial nomination in 1960 and 1968. Bennett's reputation was damaged as a result of the Arkansas Loan and Thrift scandal that involved several prominent Democratic politicians from the "Old Guard" faction, including Bennett.

Bennett died on August 26, 1979, at the age of 61.
