= Tom Gentry (politician) =

American attorney and politician

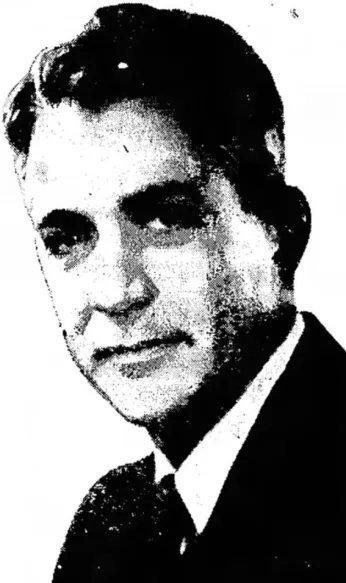
- Gentry in 1952

Attorney General of Arkansas
- In office 1953–1957
- Governor: Francis Cherry; Orval Faubus
- Preceded by: Ike Murry
- Succeeded by: Bruce Bennett

Personal details
- Born: Thomas Jefferson Gentry Jr. April 3, 1915 Malvern, Arkansas, U.S.
- Died: February 21, 1982 (aged 66)
- Party: Democratic
- Education: University of Arkansas

Thomas Jefferson Gentry Jr. (April 3, 1915 – February 21, 1982), also known as Tom Gentry and T. J. Gentry, was an American attorney and politician. He served as attorney general of Arkansas from 1953 to 1957.

== Life and career ==
Gentry was born in Malvern, Arkansas. He attended the University of Arkansas, graduating in 1937.

Gentry served as attorney general of Arkansas from 1953 to 1957.

Gentry died on February 21, 1982, at the age of 66.
