= Bob C. Riley =

American politician

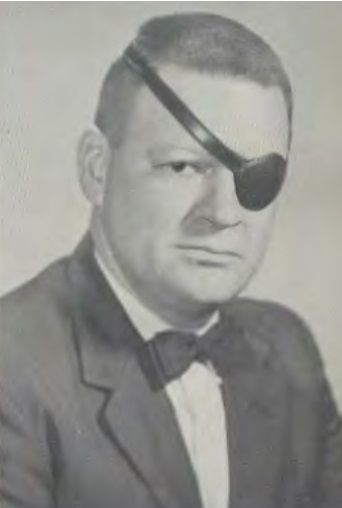

Acting Governor of Arkansas
- In office January 3, 1975 – January 12, 1975
- Preceded by: Dale Bumpers
- Succeeded by: David Pryor

12th Lieutenant Governor of Arkansas
- In office January 12, 1971 – January 3, 1975
- Governor: Dale Bumpers
- Preceded by: Maurice Britt
- Succeeded by: Joe Purcell

Mayor of Arkadelphia, Arkansas
- In office 1966–1967
- Preceded by: Charles L. Smith
- Succeeded by: Wayne Pollard

Member of the Arkansas House of Representatives
- In office 1947–1951

Personal details
- Born: September 18, 1924 Little Rock, Arkansas, U.S.
- Died: February 16, 1994 (aged 69) Arkadelphia, Arkansas, U.S.
- Resting place: Rest Haven Memorial Gardens, Arkadelphia, Arkansas, U.S.
- Party: Democratic
- Spouse: Claudia Zimmerman (m. 1956)
- Children: 1
- Education: University of Arkansas (BA (1950), MA (1951), EdD (1957)
- Occupation: College professor
- Awards: Purple Heart

Military service
- Service: United States Marine Corps
- Rank: Corporal
- Unit: Company L, 3rd Battalion, 9th Marine Regiment
- Wars: World War II

Bob Cowley Riley (September 18, 1924 – February 16, 1994) was an American politician and educator who served as the 12th Lieutenant Governor of Arkansas from 1971 to 1975, and as acting Governor of Arkansas for eleven days in January 1975, making him the first blind person to serve as a governor of any U.S. state.

A World War II veteran who lost his sight to combat wounds sustained during the Battle of Guam in 1944, Riley overcame his disabilities to build a career spanning both higher education and Democratic Party politics in Arkansas. For over two decades he was a professor of history and political science at Ouachita Baptist University in Arkadelphia, where he chaired the political science department. His distinctive black eye patch became his personal trademark, and he was known throughout Arkansas as a gifted public speaker and raconteur.

== Early life and education ==
Riley was born on September 18, 1924, in Little Rock, Arkansas, the son of Columbus Allen Riley and Winnie Craig Riley. He attended Pulaski County Rural School and Little Rock Central High School. From an early age he showed an interest in politics; as a teenager he served as a page for the Arkansas General Assembly during its 1937 legislative session.

Following the attack on Pearl Harbor on December 7, 1941, Riley left high school before graduating to enlist in the United States Marine Corps. He was assigned to Company L, 3rd Battalion, 9th Marines, part of the 3rd Marine Division, and served in the Pacific Theater of Operations.

While stationed in California prior to deployment, Riley had a minor role in the 1943 Metro-Goldwyn-Mayer film Salute to the Marines. He played the part of a concealed Japanese soldier who startles the main characters, a role that required him to wear heavy camouflage makeup.

After the war, Riley enrolled at the University of Arkansas in Fayetteville in 1945, where he earned his BA in 1950, his MA in 1951, and his Doctor of Education (EdD) in 1957. During his years of study he was simultaneously active in Democratic Party politics, serving two terms in the Arkansas House of Representatives from 1947 to 1951 while representing Pulaski County. In 1950 he mounted an unsuccessful campaign for a seat in the Arkansas Senate, reaching the run-off primary before being defeated.

== Military service and injuries ==
On July 21, 1944, during the American recapture of Guam, Corporal Riley was leading a rifle squad from Company L, 3rd Battalion, 9th Marine Regiment in an assault on a Japanese machine gun emplacement when he was severely wounded. The wounds he sustained that day were catastrophic and life-altering. His left eye was surgically removed, and although he retained minimal light perception in his right eye for a short time, that perception soon disappeared entirely, leaving him completely blind. He was hospitalized for more than a year and endured chronic pain for the remainder of his life.

After returning to civilian life, Riley adapted to his disability by learning Braille, using a walking cane for navigation, and relying on his wife and associates to guide him in unfamiliar surroundings. The black eye patch he wore over his left eye became widely recognized throughout Arkansas.

For his combat service, Riley received the Purple Heart. His unit, the 3rd Battalion, 9th Marines, was awarded the Presidential Unit Citation.

== Academic career ==
Beginning in 1951, Riley worked as an insurance broker while simultaneously teaching courses in economics and political science at Little Rock University (now the University of Arkansas at Little Rock). He taught there until 1957, when he accepted an appointment as associate professor of history and political science at Ouachita Baptist University (OBU) in Arkadelphia.

At OBU, Riley reorganized the political science faculty into a separate academic department and was appointed its first chairman. He was promoted to full professor in 1958 and went on to chair the university's broader social science division from 1960 to 1974. He was widely regarded as an exceptionally effective classroom teacher and public lecturer.

Riley continued teaching at OBU after the conclusion of his political career. Declining health eventually forced him to retire from teaching in 1980.

== Political career ==
=== Arkansas House of Representatives (1947–1951) ===
Riley served two terms as a member of the Arkansas House of Representatives, representing Pulaski County from 1947 to 1951. He was simultaneously enrolled as a student at the University of Arkansas in Fayetteville for most of this period, a circumstance that has been attributed to the exceptional deference shown to returning veterans and to the biennial schedule of the Arkansas legislature.

=== Arkadelphia City Council and Mayor (1960–1967) ===
Riley was elected to the Arkadelphia City Council in 1960 and served continuously until 1967. During the final two years of his council service, from 1966 to 1967, he served as mayor of Arkadelphia.

=== 1968 Democratic National Convention ===
In 1968, Riley was elected as a delegate to the 1968 Democratic National Convention in Chicago, held during a period of significant turbulence within the Democratic Party over the Vietnam War and civil rights.

=== Lieutenant Governor of Arkansas (1971–1975) ===
In 1970, Riley ran for lieutenant governor as the running mate of Democratic gubernatorial candidate Dale Bumpers. Bumpers and Riley defeated the incumbent Republican Governor Winthrop Rockefeller and his ticket-mate, Sterling R. Cockrill of Little Rock, in the general election. Riley defeated Cockrill by a margin of 334,379 votes (56.5%) to 232,429 votes (39.3%), with the remaining 4.2% going to Hubert Blanton of the American Independent Party. Riley carried sixty-six of Arkansas's seventy-five counties.

In 1972, running again on the Bumpers gubernatorial slate, Riley was re-elected lieutenant governor, defeating Republican Ken Coon of Fort Smith by a margin of 392,869 votes (62.8%) to 233,090 votes (37.2%), carrying majorities in seventy-two counties.

As lieutenant governor, Riley presided over the Arkansas Senate.

=== 1974 gubernatorial campaign ===
In 1974, Riley sought the Democratic nomination for governor. He competed in a three-way primary that also included former Governor Orval Faubus and U.S. Representative David Pryor of Camden. Suffering from ill health during the campaign, Riley finished third in the primary. Pryor won the nomination and went on to win the general election, defeating Republican nominee Ken Coon — the same opponent Riley had twice defeated in lieutenant governor races.

=== Acting Governor of Arkansas (January 3–14, 1975) ===
In November 1974, Governor Dale Bumpers was elected to the United States Senate, defeating incumbent Senator J. William Fulbright. Bumpers's Senate term was set to begin on January 3, 1975, before his gubernatorial term was due to expire on January 14. Bumpers accordingly resigned the governorship on January 3, 1975, elevating Riley to the position of acting governor for the remaining eleven days of the unexpired term.

Riley served as acting governor from January 3 to January 14, 1975, the date of David Pryor's inauguration as the new governor. His tenure, though brief and uneventful in terms of legislative activity, was historically significant: Riley was the first blind person to serve as governor of any U.S. state, a distinction noted by scholars and journalists. His wife, Claudia Zimmerman Riley, served as First Lady of Arkansas for the same eleven days.

== Personal life ==
Riley married Claudia Zimmerman in 1956. Their daughter, Megen, was born in 1959. The family made their home in Arkadelphia, where Riley spent virtually his entire post-military adult life as a professor and civic figure.

Riley died of congestive heart failure in Arkadelphia on February 16, 1994, at the age of 69. He was interred at Rest Haven Memorial Gardens in Arkadelphia.

== Legacy ==
Riley's career has been cited as a notable example of disabled veterans' participation in American public life in the post-World War II era. His eleven-day governorship gave him the historical distinction of being the first blind governor in United States history, a fact that has been the subject of scholarly attention, including a 2008 article in The New York Times which examined the precise nature of his visual impairment and the historical record surrounding his status. His life was also noted in Undaunted by Blindness (2012), a reference work profiling individuals who have achieved distinction despite visual impairment.

In academic circles, Riley was remembered in a formal obituary published by the American Political Science Association in its journal PS: Political Science and Politics in June 1994, co-authored by his colleague Harold F. Bass and political scientist Daniel R. Grant.

Political offices
Preceded by Maurice Britt	Lieutenant Governor of Arkansas; 1971–1975	Succeeded by Joe Purcell
Preceded by Dale Bumpers	Acting Governor of Arkansas; 1975	Succeeded by David Pryor
