= Term limits in the United States =

In the politics of the United States, term limits restrict the number of terms an officeholder may serve. At the federal level, the president can be elected to at most two four-year terms, per the Twenty-second Amendment to the United States Constitution which came into force on February 27, 1951 after four years of deliberations. Some state government offices are also term-limited, including executive, legislative, and judicial offices. Analogous measures exist at the city and county level across the U.S., though many details involving local governments in that country vary depending on the location.

Term limits are also called rotation in office. That terminology is often associated with Founding Father and later president Thomas Jefferson given his use of it in his political arguments.

== Historical background ==
=== Constitution ===
Term limits date back to the American Revolution and before that, to the democracies and republics of Antiquity. The Council of 500 in ancient Athens rotated its entire membership annually, as did the ephorate in ancient Sparta.

The Roman Republic featured a system of elected magistrates—tribunes of the plebs, aediles, quaestors, praetors, and consuls—who served a single term of one year, with re-election to the same magistracy forbidden for ten years (see cursus honorum). According to historian Garrett G. Fagan, office holding in the Roman Republic was based on "limited tenure of office" which ensured that "authority circulated frequently", helping to prevent corruption. Another benefit of the cursus honorum or run of offices was to bring the "most experienced" politicians to the upper echelons of power-holding in the ancient republic. Many of the founders of the United States were educated in the classics, and quite familiar with rotation in the office during antiquity. The debates of that day reveal a desire to study and profit from the object lessons offered by ancient democracy.

Prior to independence, several colonies had already experimented with term limits. The Fundamental Orders of Connecticut of 1639, for example, prohibited the colonial governor from serving consecutive terms by setting terms at one year's length, and holding "that no person be chosen Governor above once in two years." Shortly after independence, the Pennsylvania Constitution of 1776 set maximum service in the Pennsylvania General Assembly at "four years in seven." Benjamin Franklin's influence is seen not only in that he chaired the constitutional convention which drafted the Pennsylvania constitution, but also because it included, virtually unchanged, Franklin's earlier proposals on executive rotation. Pennsylvania's plural executive was composed of twelve citizens elected for the term of three years, followed by a mandatory vacation of four years.

The Articles of Confederation, adopted in 1781, established term limits for the delegates of the Continental Congress, mandating in Article V that "no person shall be capable of being a delegate for more than three years in any term of six years."

On October 2, 1789, the Continental Congress appointed a committee of thirteen to examine forms of government for the impending union of the states. Among the proposals was that from the state of Virginia, written by Thomas Jefferson, urging a limitation of tenure, "to prevent every danger which might arise to American freedom by continuing too long in office the members of the Continental Congress." The committee made recommendations, which as regards congressional term limits were incorporated unchanged into the Articles of Confederation (1781–1789). The fifth Article stated that "no person shall be capable of being a delegate [to the continental congress] for more than three years in any term of six years." (Note: Article IX, paragraph 5, of the Articles of Confederation provided that, "no person be allowed to serve in the office of president more than one year in any term of four years.")

=== Term limits in the Constitution ===
Unlike the Articles of Confederation, the federal constitution convention at Philadelphia omitted term limits from the U.S. Constitution of 1789. At the convention, some delegates spoke passionately against term limits; such as Rufus King, who said "that he who has proved himself to be most fit for an Office, ought not to be excluded by the constitution from holding it." The Electoral College, it was believed by some delegates at the convention, could have a role to play in limiting unfit officers from continuing.

When the states ratified the Constitution (1787–88), several leading statesmen regarded the lack of mandatory limits to tenure as a dangerous defect, especially, they thought, as regards the presidency and the Senate. Richard Henry Lee viewed the absence of legal limits to tenure, together with certain other features of the Constitution, as "most highly and dangerously oligarchic." Both Jefferson and George Mason advised limits on re-election to the Senate and to the Presidency, because, said Mason, "nothing is so essential to the preservation of a Republican government as a periodic rotation." Historian Mercy Otis Warren warned, "there is no provision for a rotation, nor anything to prevent the perpetuity of office in the same hands for life; which by a little well-timed bribery, will probably be done."

=== Presidential term limits 1789–1952 ===
Korzi says George Washington did not set the informal precedent for a two-term limit for the Presidency. He only meant he was too worn out to personally continue in office. It was Thomas Jefferson who made it a principle in 1808. He made many statements calling for term limits in one form or another. (Note: See Family Guardian, "Thomas Jefferson on Politics & Government.")

The two-term limit tradition was maintained unofficially for 132 years. It was unsuccessfully challenged by Ulysses S. Grant in 1880, Theodore Roosevelt in 1912, and Woodrow Wilson in 1920. Franklin D. Roosevelt successfully ran for a third term in 1940, citing the outbreak of World War II. The two Roosevelts are the only presidents to run for a third term in a general election; Grant and Wilson aimed to do so but failed to gain their parties' nominations. Franklin Roosevelt was re-elected in 1944 for a fourth term amidst the United States' engagement in World War II but died shortly afterwards in office. Shortly after the 1946 mid-term elections, Republicans took control of both house and the senate and very soon after the House of Representatives proposed joint Resolution 27, calling a set limit of two terms each containing four years for all future presidents. After some revisions by the senate, the approved amendment was sent out to the states for ratification on March 21, 1947. Soon after the Twenty-second Amendment to the United States Constitution was adopted and ratified in 1951, formally establishing in law the two-term limit — though it did not apply to the incumbent Harry S. Truman, Franklin Roosevelt's successor. Truman declined to run for a third term in 1952.

The fact that "perpetuity in office" was not approached until the 20th century is due in part to the influence of rotation in office as a popular 19th-century concept. "Ideas are, in truth, forces," and rotation in office enjoyed such normative support, especially at the local level, that it altered political reality. (Note: For a detailed study of the 19th-century concepts of rotation, consult Struble (1979–1980, p. 650). See also Struble (2010); Young (1966).)

During the American Civil War, the Confederate Constitution limited its president to one six-year term. Only Jefferson Davis served as Confederate president, but he did not complete a full term in office before surrendering to the Union.

=== Era of incumbency ===
The practice of nomination rotation for the House of Representatives began to decline after the Civil War. It took a generation or so before the direct primary system, civil service reforms, and the ethic of professionalism worked to eliminate rotation in office as a common political practice. By the turn of the 20th century the era of incumbency was coming into full swing.

A total of eight presidents served two full terms and declined a third. Three presidents served one full term and refused a second. After World War II, however, an officeholder class had developed to the point that congressional tenure rivaled that of the U.S. Supreme Court, where tenure is for life.

=== Term limits movement ===
A movement in favor of term limits took hold in the early 1990s, and reached its apex in 1992 to 1994, a period when seventeen states enacted term limits through state legislation or state constitutional amendments.

Many of the laws enacted limited terms for both the state legislature and in the state's delegation to Congress. As they pertain to Congress, these laws were struck down as unconstitutional by U.S. Supreme Court in U.S. Term Limits, Inc. v. Thornton (1995), in which the court ruled, on a 5–4 vote, that state governments cannot limit the terms of members of the national government.

Where rotation in the legislative branch has withstood court challenges, term limits continue to garner popular support. As of 2002, the advocacy group "U.S. Term Limits" found that in the seventeen states where state legislators served in rotation, public support for term limits ranged from 60 to 78 percent.

== Federal term limits ==
Term limits by federal office
Office	Restrictions
President	Limited to being elected to a total of two four-year terms. If a vice president becomes president by succession and completes more than two years of said former president's unfinished term, they may be elected in their own right only once. A vice president who becomes president by succession and serves less than two years of their predecessor's term may be elected to two more four-year terms.
Vice president	Unlimited four-year terms
House of Representatives	Unlimited two-year terms
Senate	Unlimited six-year terms
Supreme Court and lower courts	No term limits, appointed to serve "during good Behaviour" (but can be impeached and removed from office for "high Crimes and Misdemeanors"). In practice a judge or justice serves until death or resignation.

Term limits at the federal level are restricted to the executive branch and some agencies. Judicial appointments at the federal level are made for life and are not subject to election or to term limits. The U.S. Congress remains (since the Thornton decision of 1995) without electoral limits.

=== President ===
George Washington's decision in 1796 not to run for a third term has often been given credit as the start of a tradition that no president should ever run for a third term. Washington wanted to retire when his first term ended in 1792, but all his advisors begged him to stand for re-election. By 1796, however, he insisted on retiring, as he felt exhausted and disgusted by virulent personal attacks on his integrity. His Farewell Address very briefly mentioned why he would not run for a third term and goes on to give a great deal of political advice, but it does not mention term limits. After his death, his refusal to run was explained in terms of a "no-third-tradition." Crockett (2008) argues, "The argument for term limits has a solid and respectable pedigree. Contrary to popular belief, however, that pedigree does not begin with George Washington." The second president, John Adams, lost re-election in 1800 to Thomas Jefferson. Jefferson himself declined re-election to a third term, attributing the precedent to Washington.

In the 1780s, about half the states had term limits for governors. The Constitutional Convention of 1787 discussed the issue and decided not to institute presidential term limits. "The matter was fairly discussed in the Convention," Washington wrote in 1788, "and to my full convictions [...] I can see no propriety in precluding ourselves from the services of any man, who on some great emergency shall be deemed universally, most capable of serving the Public," even after serving two terms. The Constitution, Washington explained, retained sufficient checks against political corruption and stagnant leadership without a presidential term limits provision. Jefferson, however, strongly endorsed a policy of term limits. He rejected calls from supporters that he run for a third term in 1808, telling several state legislatures in 1807–1808 that he needed to support "the sound precedent set by [his] illustrious predecessor."

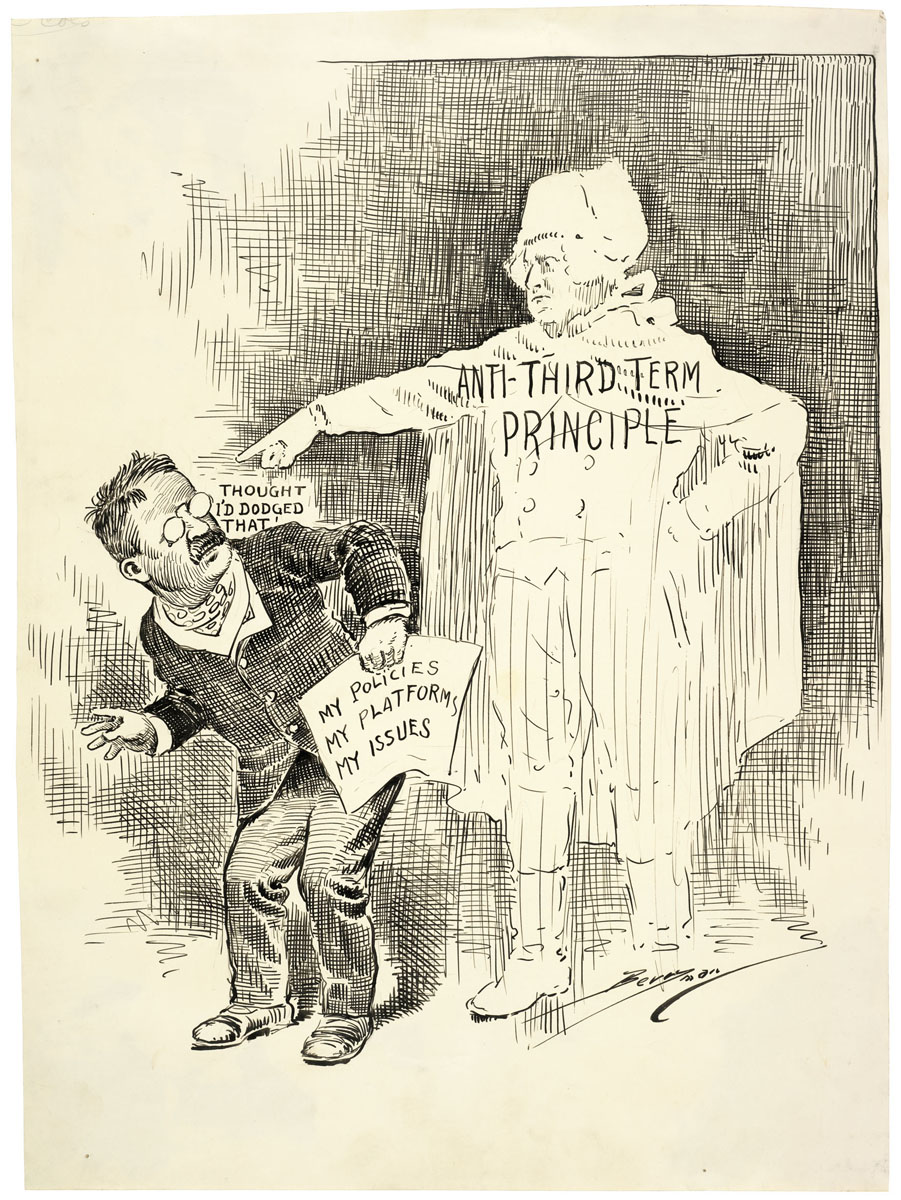
A political cartoon showing Washington rejecting Theodore Roosevelt's highly controversial run for a third term in 1912

In 1861, the Confederate States of America adopted a six-year term for their president and vice president and barred the president from seeking re-election. That innovation was endorsed by many American politicians after the Civil War, most notably by Rutherford B. Hayes in his inaugural address. Ulysses S. Grant was urged to run for a third term in 1876, but he refused. He did try to win the 1880 nomination but was defeated in part because of popular anti-third-term sentiment. Theodore Roosevelt had already served over seven years and in 1912, after a four-year hiatus, ran for a third term. He was criticized for doing so, and attempted assassin John Schrank stated that his motivation for shooting Roosevelt was preventing a third term. The 1912 election was ultimately won by Woodrow Wilson.

Franklin D. Roosevelt (president, 1933–1945) was the only president to be elected more than twice; he won a third term in 1940 and a fourth term in 1944 (though he died in office three months into his fourth term). This gave rise to a successful move to formalize the traditional two-term limit by amending the U.S. Constitution. As ratified in 1951, the Twenty-Second Amendment says, "no person shall be elected to the office of President more than twice." The new amendment explicitly did not apply to the incumbent president, Harry S. Truman. However, Truman declined to seek re-election to a third term in 1952.

=== Congress ===
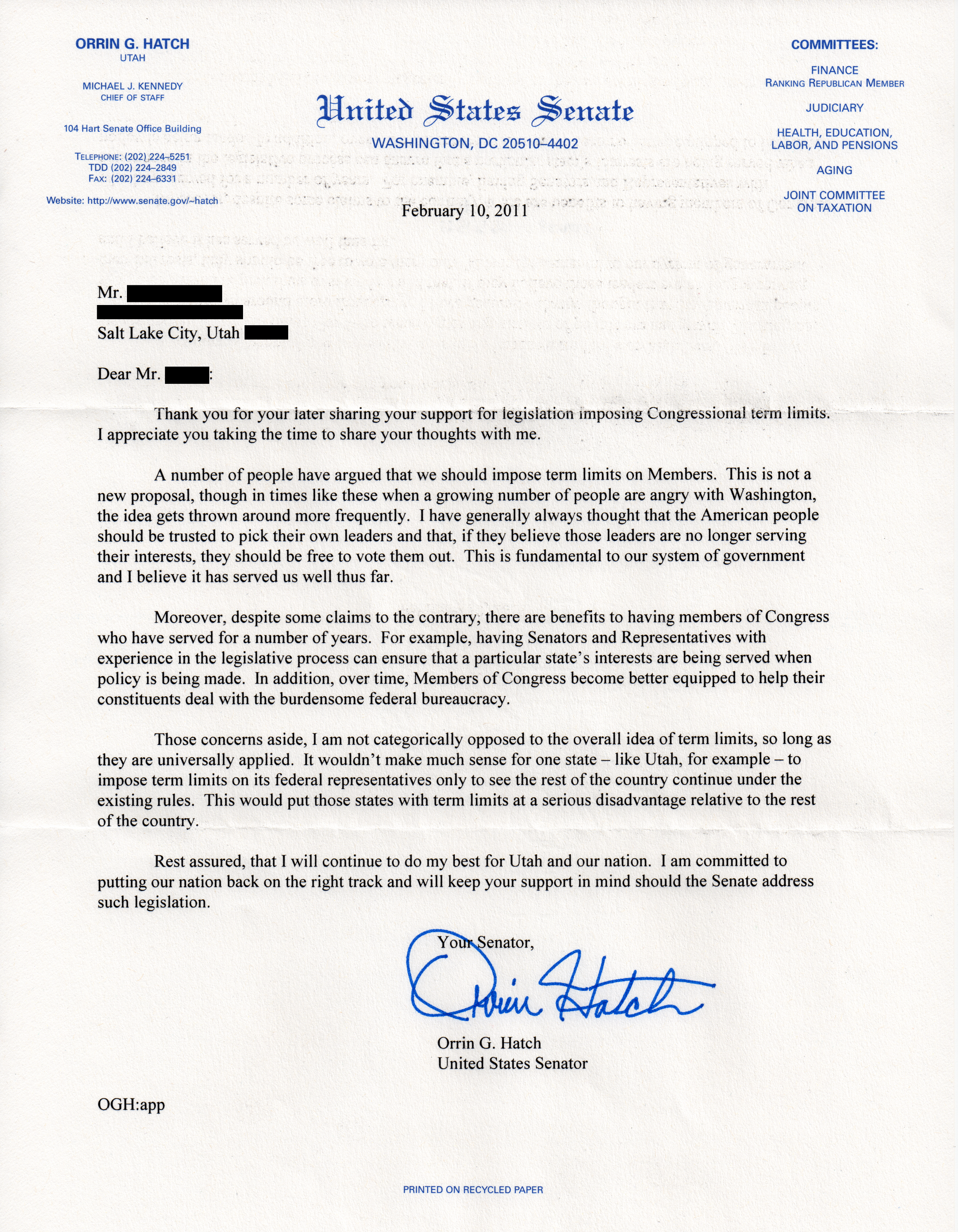
Letter from Senator Orrin Hatch, first elected in 1976, expressing reservations regarding term limits (dated February 10, 2011)

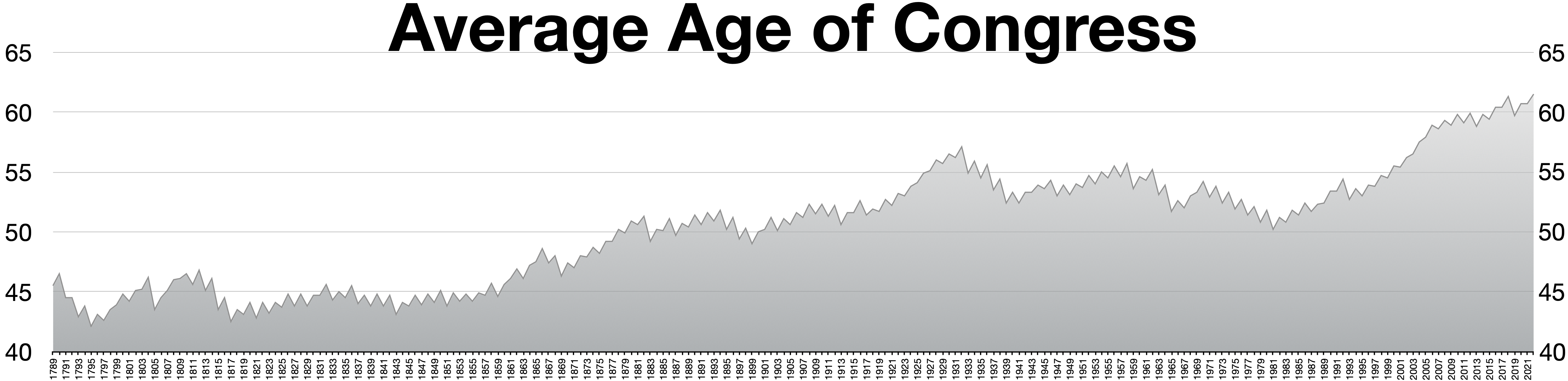
Average age of a member of Congress through 2022

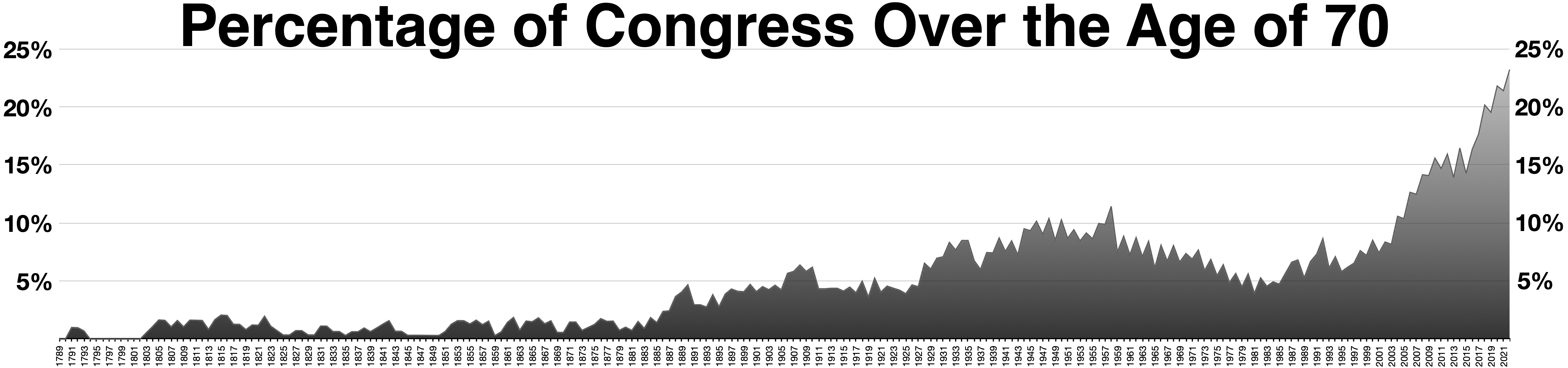
Percentage of Congress over the age of 70 through 2022

Reformers during the early 1990s used the initiative and referendum to put congressional term limits on the ballot in 24 states. Voters in eight of these states approved the congressional term limits by an average electoral margin of two to one. It was an open question whether states had the constitutional authority to enact these limits. In May 1995, the U.S. Supreme Court ruled 5–4 in U.S. Term Limits, Inc. v. Thornton, 514 U.S. 779 (1995), that states cannot impose term limits upon their federal representatives or senators.

In the 1994 U.S. elections, part of the "Contract With America" Republican platform included legislation for term limits in Congress. After winning the majority, a Republican congressman brought a constitutional amendment to the House floor that proposed limiting members of the Senate to two six-year terms and members of the House to six two-year terms. However, this rate of rotation was so slow (the life-tenured Supreme Court averages about 16 years) that the congressional version of term limits garnered little support among the populist backers of term limits, including U.S. Term Limits, the largest private organization pushing for congressional term limits. (Note: U.S. Term Limits wanted House members to be limited to three two-year terms.) The bill got only a bare majority (227–204), falling short of the two-thirds majority (290) needed for constitutional amendments. Three other term limit amendment bills failed to get more than 200 votes. (Note: The four constitutional amendments on term limits which the House rejected March 29, 1995, were sponsored by: Democrat John Dingell [12/12 retroactive], rejected 135–297; Republican Bob Inglis [6/12, not retroactive], rejected 114–316; Republican Van Hilleary [12/12, unretroactive, but defers to more stringent state imposed limits], rejected 164–265; Republican Bill McCollum [12/12 not retroactive and would override more stringent state limits]; approved by less than the requisite 2/3, 227–204; on February 12, 1997, Congress did likewise by a margin of 217–211 [50.7%].)

Defeated in Congress and overridden by the Supreme Court, the federal term limit movement was brought to a halt. The term limits intended simultaneously to reform state legislatures (as distinguished from the federal congressional delegations) remain in force, however, in fifteen states.

In 2007, Larry J. Sabato revived the debate over term limits by arguing in A More Perfect Constitution that the success and popularity of term limits at the state level suggests that they should be adopted at the federal level as well. He specifically put forth the idea of congressional term limits and suggested a national constitutional convention be used to accomplish the amendment, since the Congress would be unlikely to propose and adopt any amendment that limits its own power.

Some state legislators have also expressed their opinions on term limits. It is confirmed that in the following five states—and there may be others—state lawmakers approved resolutions asking Congress to propose a federal constitutional amendment to limit the number of terms which members of Congress may serve:

1. South Dakota Legislature in 1989 (designated as POM-42 in the U.S. Senate) approved South Dakota House Joint Resolution No. 1001 (see Congressional Record of April 4, 1989, at pages 5395 and 5396, with verbatim text provided).
2. Hawaii Senate in 1990 (designated as Memorial 400 in the U.S. House of Representatives) approved Hawaii Senate Resolution No. 41—unicameral only (see Congressional Record of September 28, 1998, at page 22655). It took eight years for this resolution to find its way into the Congressional Record and to be correctly referred to the Committee on the Judiciary—and even then, its text was not provided in the Congressional Record. Back in 1990, Hawaii's S.R. No. 41 was indeed received by the U.S. House of Representatives, and was designated as Memorial 416, (Congressional Record of June 6, 1990, at pages 13,262 and 13,263) but the resolution was erroneously referred to the Committee on Energy and Commerce.
3. Utah Legislature in 1990 (designated as POM-644 in the U.S. Senate) approved Utah Senate Joint Resolution No. 24 (see Congressional Record of September 27, 1994, at page 26033, with verbatim text provided). It took four years for this resolution to find its way into the U.S. Senate's portion of the Congressional Record.
4. Idaho Legislature in 1992 (designated as Memorial 401 in the U.S. House of Representatives) approved Idaho Senate Joint Memorial No. 116 (see Congressional Record of April 29, 1992, at page 9804—text not provided in the Congressional Record).
5. Florida Legislature in 2012 (designated as POM-122 in the U.S. Senate) approved Florida House Memorial No. 83 (see Congressional Record of July 25, 2012, at page S5378, with verbatim text provided).
6. On February 10, 2016, Florida lawmakers approved House Memorial No. 417 calling upon Congress, pursuant to Article V of the Federal Constitution, to assemble a Convention to prepare a constitutional amendment that would establish term limits upon members of Congress.

=== Supreme Court ===
Legal scholars have discussed whether or not to impose term limits on the Supreme Court of the United States. Currently, Supreme Court justices are appointed for life "during good behavior." A sentiment has developed, among certain scholars, that the Supreme Court may not be accountable in a way that is most in line with the spirit of checks and balances. Equally, scholars have argued that life tenure has taken on a new meaning in a modern context. Changes in medical care have markedly raised life expectancy and therefore have allowed justices to serve for longer than ever before. Steven G. Calabresi and James Lindgren, professors of law at Northwestern University, argued that because vacancies in the court are occurring with less frequency and justices served on average 26.1 years between 1971 and 2006, the "efficacy of the democratic check that the appointment process provides on the Court's membership" is reduced. There have been several similar proposals to implement term limits for the nation's highest court, including Professor of Law at Duke University Paul Carrington's "Supreme Court Renewal Act of 2005."

Many of the proposals center around a term limit for justices that would be 10, 18 years to 25 years in length. (Larry Sabato, Professor of Political Science at the University of Virginia, suggested between 15 and 18 years.) The staggered term limits of 18 years proposed by Calebresi & Lindgren (2006) and Carrington & Cramton (2005) would allow for a new appointment to the Court every two years, which in effect would allow every president at least two appointments. Carrington has argued that such a measure would not require a constitutional amendment as the "Constitution doesn't even mention life tenure; it merely requires that justices serve during 'good behavior'." The idea was endorsed among Judges, as John Roberts supported term limits before he was appointed to the Supreme Court as chief justice. Calabresi, Lindgren, and Carrington have also proposed that when justices have served out their proposed 18-year term they should be able to sit on other Federal Courts until retirement, death, or removal.

Fairleigh Dickinson University's PublicMind Poll measured American voters' attitudes towards various proposed Supreme Court reforms, including implementing term limits. The 2010 poll found that a majority of Americans were largely unaware of a proposal to impose a term limit of 18 years, as 82% reported they had heard little or nothing at all. Notwithstanding a lack of awareness, 52% of Americans approved of limiting terms to 18 years, while 35% disapproved. When asked how old is too old for a Supreme Court judge to serve if he seems healthy, 48% said "no limit as long as he is healthy", while 31% agreed that anyone over the age of 70 is too old.

Some state lawmakers have officially expressed to Congress a desire for a federal constitutional amendment to limit terms of Supreme Court justices as well as of judges of federal courts below the Supreme Court level. While there might be others, below are three known examples:

1. In 1957, the Alabama Legislature adopted Senate Joint Resolution No. 47 on the subject (appearing in the U.S. Senate's portion of the Congressional Record on July 3, 1957, at page 10863, with full text provided).
2. In 1978, the Tennessee General Assembly adopted House Joint Resolution No. 21 on the subject (designated as POM-612 by the U.S. Senate and quoted in full in the Congressional Record of April 25, 1978, at page 11437).
3. In 1998, the Louisiana House of Representatives adopted House Resolution No. 120 on the subject (designated as POM-511 by the U.S. Senate and quoted in full in the Congressional Record of July 17, 1998, at page 16076).

== State term limits ==
Term limits for state officials have existed since colonial times. The Pennsylvania Charter of Liberties of 1682, and the colonial frame of government of the same year, both authored by William Penn, provided for triennial rotation of the provincial council—the upper house of the colonial legislature. The Delaware Constitution of 1776 limited the governor to a single three-year term; currently, the governor of Delaware can serve two four-year terms.

=== Gubernatorial term limits ===
United States gubernatorial term limits as of 2026: No limit; four-year terms No limit; two-year terms One; re-eligible after 4 years / Two; re-eligible after 4 years Two consecutive; 8 of 12 rule Two consecutive; 8 of 16 rule Two; life

Governors of 37 states and 4 territories are subject to various term limits, while the governors of 13 states, Puerto Rico, and the mayor of Washington, D.C., may serve an unlimited number of terms. Each state's gubernatorial term limits are prescribed by its state constitution, with the exception of Wyoming, whose limits are found in its statutes. Territorial term limits are prescribed by its constitution in the Northern Mariana Islands, the Organic Acts in Guam and the U.S. Virgin Islands, and by statute in American Samoa.

Uniquely, Virginia prohibits its governors from serving consecutive terms, although former governors are eligible to serve again as governor after a specified period (currently, 4 years) out of office. Several other states formerly had this "no succession" rule (which was part of Virginia's original constitution in 1776), but all have eliminated the prohibition except Virginia by 2000 (including Mississippi, which repealed it in 1986, and Kentucky, which repealed it in 1992).

The governors of the following states and territories are limited to two consecutive terms, but are eligible to run again after four years out of office: Alabama, Alaska, Arizona, Colorado, Florida, Georgia, Hawaii, Kansas, Kentucky, Maine, Maryland, Nebraska, New Jersey, New Mexico, North Carolina, Ohio, Pennsylvania, Rhode Island, South Carolina, South Dakota, Tennessee, West Virginia, American Samoa, Guam, and the U.S. Virgin Islands.

Equivalently, the governors of Indiana and Oregon are limited to serving 8 out of any 12 years. Conversely, the governors of Montana and Wyoming are limited to two terms, serving 8 out of any 16 years.

Finally, the governors of the following states and territory are limited to two terms during their respective lifetime: Arkansas, California, Delaware, Louisiana, Michigan, Mississippi, Missouri, Nevada, North Dakota, the Northern Mariana Islands, and Oklahoma. Former governor of California Jerry Brown, however, served four non-consecutive terms because his first two terms were before limits were passed in California, and the limits did not apply to individuals' prior terms. Similarly, North Dakota's term limit law only applies to individuals elected after 2023.

The governors of New Hampshire and Vermont may serve unlimited two-year terms. The governors (or equivalent) in the following states, district, and territory may serve unlimited four-year terms: Connecticut, Idaho, Illinois, Iowa, Massachusetts, Minnesota, New York, Texas, Utah, Washington, Wisconsin, District of Columbia, and Puerto Rico. The governor of Utah was previously limited to serving three terms, but all term limit laws have since been repealed by the legislature.

=== State legislatures with term limits ===
Seventeen state legislatures currently have term limits. The earliest state legislative term limit was enacted in 1990, and the most recent was enacted in 2022. Term limits only went into effect years after they were enacted.

- Arizona State Legislature: four consecutive two-year terms for both houses (eight years). No limit on total number of terms.
- Arkansas General Assembly: twelve consecutive years in either chamber of the legislature with the option to return after a four-year break.
  - Prior to the 2014 election, the previous limits of three two-year terms for House members (six years) and two four-year terms for Senate members (eight years) applied. These limits no longer apply.
- California State Legislature: twelve years combined in either Assembly or Senate.
  - For legislators first elected on or before June 5, 2012, the previous limits (enacted in 1990) of three two-year terms for Assembly members (six years) and two four-year terms for Senate members (eight years) still apply.
- Colorado General Assembly: four consecutive two-year terms in the House (eight years) and two consecutive four-year terms in the Senate (eight years). Former members can run again after a four-year break.
- Florida Legislature: may serve no more than eight consecutive years in either house. No limit on total number of terms.
- Illinois Senate: Senate presidents and minority leaders may not serve for more than 10 years.
- Louisiana State Legislature: three consecutive four-year terms for both houses (twelve years). Members may run for the opposite body without having to sit out an election.
- Maine Legislature: four two-year terms for both houses (eight years). No limit on total number of terms.
- Michigan Legislature: twelve years combined in either chamber of the legislature.
  - Prior to the 2022 election, the limits were three two-year terms for House members (six years) and two four-year terms for Senate members (eight years).
- Missouri General Assembly: four two-year terms for House members (eight years) and two four-year terms for Senate members (eight years). Members may be elected again to the other house, but not serve more than 16 years.
- Montana State Legislature: four two-year terms for House members (eight years) in any sixteen-year period and two four-year terms for Senate members (eight years) in any sixteen-year period.
- Nebraska Legislature: unicameral legislature; members limited to two consecutive four-year terms (eight years), after which they must wait four years before running again.
- Nevada Legislature: six two-year terms for Assembly members (twelve years) and three four-year terms for Senate members (twelve years).
- North Dakota Legislature: two cumulative four-year terms for both houses (eight years). Term limits only apply to individuals elected after the approval of the amendment in 2022.
- Ohio General Assembly: four consecutive two-year terms for House members (eight years) and two consecutive four-year terms for Senate members (eight years).
- Oklahoma Legislature: twelve years of total combined service in either the House or the Senate. If a legislator's first term is the result of a special election, that service does not count toward the limit.
- South Dakota Legislature: four consecutive two-year terms for both houses (eight years).

=== Overturned or repealed state legislative term limits ===
Legislative term limits have been repealed or overturned in six states. Term limits for state legislatures were adopted by Idaho and Utah in 1994, but repealed by their legislatures in 2002 and 2003 respectively. Term limits adopted in four states were struck down as unconstitutional by the state supreme courts in those states: in Massachusetts, Washington and Wyoming, the court ruled that term limits could not be enacted by statute, and could only be enacted by an amendment to the state constitution; the Oregon Supreme Court ruled that the Oregon initiative establishing term limits violated the single-subject rule.

== Municipal term limits ==
Some localities impose term limits for local office. Among the 20 most populous U.S. cities:

- There are no term limits in Baltimore, Maryland; Charlotte, North Carolina; Chicago, Illinois; Columbus, Ohio; Detroit, Michigan; Fort Worth, Texas; and Indianapolis, Indiana.
- Term limits of equal length are applied to both mayors and city council members in Austin, Dallas, Houston, and San Antonio in Texas; Jacksonville, Florida; Memphis, Tennessee; New York City; and San Diego, San Francisco, and San Jose in California.
- Philadelphia, Pennsylvania, has term limits for the mayor, but not the city council. The mayor may serve two consecutive terms but there is no limit on the total number of terms.
- Los Angeles, California, and Phoenix, Arizona, have term limits for both the mayor and city council, but the term limits for the mayor are stricter than the term limits for the council.

A two-term limit was imposed on New York City Council members and citywide elected officials (except for district attorneys) in New York City after a 1993 referendum (see the Charter of the City of New York, § 1138). On November 3, 2008, however, when Michael Bloomberg was in his second term of mayor, the City Council approved the extension of the two-term limit to a three-term limit; one year later, he was elected to a third term. The two-term limit was reinstated after a referendum in 2010.

== Negative impacts ==
Research studies have shown that legislative term limits increase legislative polarization, reduce the legislative skills of politicians, reduce the legislative productivity of politicians, weaken legislatures vis-à-vis the executive, and reduce voter turnout. Parties respond to the implementation of term limits by recruiting candidates for office on more partisan lines. States that implement term limits in the state legislatures are associated with also developing more powerful House speakers.

Term limits have not proven to reduce campaign spending, reduce the gender gap in political representation, increase the diversity of lawmakers, or increase the constituent service activities of lawmakers. Term limits have been linked to lower growth in revenues and expenditures.

== See also ==
- Gerontocracy#United States
- List of longest-serving United States governors
- List of political term limits
- Notes of Debates in the Federal Convention of 1787
- Political class
- Second Constitutional Convention of the United States
- Widow's succession
