= Hugh M. Bland =

American judge (1898–1967)

Honorable Hugh M. Bland

Associate Justice of the Arkansas Supreme Court
- In office 1966 – January 1967
- Appointed by: Orval Faubus
- Preceded by: J. Frank Holt
- Succeeded by: Conley Byrd

Personal details
- Born: November 1, 1898 near Springdale, Arkansas
- Died: April 1, 1967 (aged 68)
- Resting place: Oak Cemetery
- Spouse: Ann Johnson
- Children: none
- Profession: Lawyer and judge

Military service
- Allegiance: United States
- Branch/service: Army
- Years of service: 1917-1918
- Unit: 28th Division Field Artillery

Hugh Monroe Bland (November 1, 1898 – April 1, 1967) was a justice of the Arkansas Supreme Court in 1966.

Bland, then a Chancellor from Fort Smith, Arkansas, was appointed by Governor Orval Faubus to a seat vacated by the resignation of J. Frank Holt.

== Early life ==
Bland was born near Springdale, Arkansas to Addison Franklin Bland and Elizabeth Reed Bland on November 1, 1898, in an area now inundated by Beaver Lake. At age one, the family moved to Oolahgah, Indian Territory, and later moved to Canehill, Arkansas. Bland graduated from Cane Hill High School and later Northeastern State Teacher's College in Tahlequah, Oklahoma in 1917 before becoming a teacher for three months. He enlisted in the United States Army during World War I and served until the Armistice of 11 November 1918. After discharge, Bland returned to Tahlequah to teach math at the college for a year. He later attended the University of Oklahoma College of Law and graduated in 1922.

== Legal career ==
Cherokee County, Oklahoma elected Bland district judge shortly after his graduation, while also briefly serving as county attorney in addition to his private practice. He practiced law in Muskogee, Oklahoma and Wewoka, Oklahoma over the years before to moving to Fort Smith, Arkansas in 1939. His work representing the United States as a special assistant to the US attorney general during condemnation proceedings associated with Bull Shoals Lake and Lake Norfork raised his profile in the legal community. Bland later served as special assistant to the U.S. attorney for the Western District of Arkansas in the early 1950s. His profile also grew in the community; he was elected president of the Bar Association of Sebastian County, Arkansas and served on various boards and commissions.

Bland entered his name for chancery judge for the Tenth District in 1960 as an independent after an acrimonious battle for the Democratic Party primary between Franklin Wilder and Jim Langston brought opprobrium to the community. Bland won in the general election after running on his character and reputation and promise to return decorum to the office. Bland served until April 1966, when he was nominated to be associate justice of the Arkansas Supreme Court.

Bland served until failing health led him to resign in January 1967; he died April 1 and is buried in Oak Cemetery in Fort Smith.

Political offices
Preceded by J. Frank Holt	Justice of the Arkansas Supreme Court; 1966–1966	Succeeded by Conley Byrd
