= Leon Johnson (judge) =

American judge

First Division Circuit Judge for the Sixth Judicial District of Arkansas
- Incumbent
- Assumed office November 2, 2010

Acting Arkansas Attorney General
- In office January 3, 2003 – January 14, 2003
- Preceded by: Mark Pryor
- Succeeded by: Mike Beebe

Personal details
- Born: James Leon Johnson; August 22, 1961 (age 64) Searcy, Arkansas, U.S.
- Education: Harding University (BA); University of Arkansas Law School (JD)

Leon Johnson (born James Leon Johnson on August 22, 1961) is a Judge of the Arkansas Circuit Courts. He serves as the First Division Circuit Judge for the Sixth Judicial District, which is composed of Pulaski and Perry counties.

== Education and career ==
Born in White County, Arkansas, Wilson received a Bachelor of Arts degree from Harding University in 1983 and a Juris Doctor from University of Arkansas in 1988. He was in private practice in Jacksonville, Arkansas from 1994 to 2000. In 2000, he was appointed by Mike Huckabee to complete the term of Mark Pryor as acting Arkansas Attorney General. He served for 11 days. He was the first Black person to serve as Arkansas Attorney General, and the second Black person to hold an executive branch constitutional office in Arkansas.

== State Judicial Service ==
In 2010, Johnson was elected as the First Division Circuit Judge for the Sixth Judicial district. He was re-elected in 2016 and 2022.
