= 1976 Arkansas gubernatorial election =

- November 2, 1976
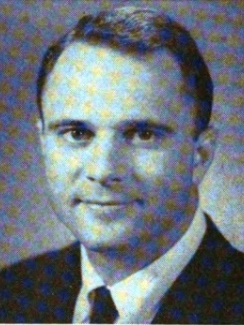

| Nominee | David Pryor | Leon Griffith |
| Party | Democratic | Republican |
| Popular vote | 605,083 | 121,716 |
| Percentage | 83.24% | 16.74% |
- County results Pryor: 60–70% 70–80% 80–90% >90%
Governor before election
David Pryor
Democratic
Elected Governor
David Pryor
Democratic

The 1976 Arkansas gubernatorial election was held on Tuesday November 2, Incumbent Democratic governor David Pryor defeated Republican candidate Leon Griffith with 83.24% of the vote. Pryor carried all of the state's 75 counties in his reelection effort, the last governor to do so until fellow Democrat Mike Beebe did in his 2010 reelection bid.

== Primary elections ==
Primary elections were held on May 25, 1976.

=== Democratic primary ===
==== Candidates ====
- David Pryor, incumbent governor
- Jim Lindsey, Real Estate developer and former University of Arkansas and Minnesota Vikings football player
- Frank Lady, Attorney and former state representative
- John H. (Tuffy) Chambers, farmer

==== Results ====
Democratic primary results
| Party | Candidate | Votes | % |
|---|---|---|---|
| Democratic | David Pryor (incumbent) | 312,872 | 59.49 |
| Democratic | Jim Lindsey | 171,031 | 32.52 |
| Democratic | Frank Lady | 36,832 | 7.00 |
| Democratic | John H. Chambers | 5,223 | 1.00 |
| Total votes | | 525,968 | 100.00 |

=== Republican primary ===
==== Candidates ====
- Leon Griffith, master plumber
- Joseph H. Weston, editor of the Sharp Citizen

==== Results ====
Republican primary results
| Party | Candidate | Votes | % |
|---|---|---|---|
| Republican | Leon Griffith | 13,044 | 57.22 |
| Republican | Joseph H. Weston | 9,753 | 42.78 |
| Total votes | | 22,797 | 100.00 |

== General election ==
=== Candidates ===
- David Pryor, Democratic
- Leon Griffith, Republican

=== Results ===
1976 Arkansas gubernatorial election
| Party | Candidate | Votes | % | ±% |
|---|---|---|---|---|
| Democratic | David Pryor (incumbent) | 605,083 | 83.24% | +17.67% |
| Republican | Leon Griffith | 121,716 | 16.74% | −17.67% |
| Write-in | Thaddeus Honeycutt | 150 | 0.02% | +0.00% |
| Majority | | 483,367 | 66.50% | |
| Turnout | | 726,949 | 100.00% | |
| Democratic hold | | Swing | | |

== Bibliography ==
- Glashan, Roy R. (1979). American Governors and Gubernatorial Elections, 1775-1978. Meckler Books. ISBN 0-930466-17-9.
- Gubernatorial Elections, 1787-1997. Washington, D.C.: Congressional Quarterly Inc. 1998. ISBN 1-56802-396-0.
- Paul Riviere, Secretary of State (1980). 1976 Arkansas Elections: A Compilation of Primary, Run-off and General Election results for State and District Offices. Little Rock, Arkansas: Arkansas Election Services Division.
- Scammon, Richard M.; McGillivray, Alice V. (1977). America Votes 12: a handbook of contemporary American election statistics, 1976. Washington, D.C.: Elections Research Center.
