= Steve Clark (Arkansas politician) =

American politician

51st Arkansas Attorney General
- In office January 9, 1979 – November 1990
- Governor: Bill Clinton; Frank D. White; Bill Clinton
- Preceded by: Bill Clinton
- Succeeded by: Ron Fields

Personal details
- Born: John Steven Clark; March 21, 1947 (age 78); Leachville, Arkansas, U.S.
- Political party: Democratic
- Spouse: Suzanne Greichen
- Education: Arkansas State University; University of Arkansas School of Law (JD)

John Steven Clark (born March 21, 1947) is an American politician who was the longest-serving attorney general in Arkansas history. Born in Leachville, Arkansas to John W. Clark and Jean Bearden Clark, Clark decided early on that he wanted to be a politician. He graduated from Arkansas State University and received a Juris Doctor degree at the University of Arkansas School of Law prior to briefly practicing law. He resigned in 1990 after being convicted of fraud.

Party political offices
Preceded by Bill Clinton	Democratic nominee for Arkansas Attorney General; 1978, 1980, 1982, 1984, 1986	Succeeded by Winston Bryant
