= Term limits in Wyoming =

As of September 2026, Wyoming statute law limits a person from serving eight or more years as Governor of Wyoming in any sixteen-year period. The law originally applied to all state elected officials, but Cathcar v Meyer (Wy0. 2004) invalidated the statute for legislators, while keeping it intact for the governor. Wyoming currently imposes no term limits on other state elected officials.

== Background ==
The state legislature passed a bill limiting the office of Governor to two consecutive terms of four years each after Democratic governor Edgar Herschler served three terms into the mid-1980s. In 1992, voters approved term limits by ballot initiative.

Neither action constituted an amendment to the Wyoming Constitution. Twelve years later, two state legislators challenged the term limit law in a lawsuit; the Wyoming Supreme Court invalidated the limits in a unanimous decision, ruling that a constitutional amendment would be required to establish such a law.

The ruling did not apply directly to statewide executive positions (including the office of governor), but it was expected in early 2009 that popular Governor Dave Freudenthal might challenge that law on the same grounds.

== See also ==
- Term limits in the United States
