= 1990 Arkansas gubernatorial election =

- November 6, 1990
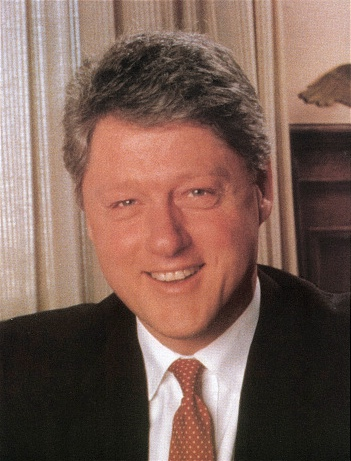

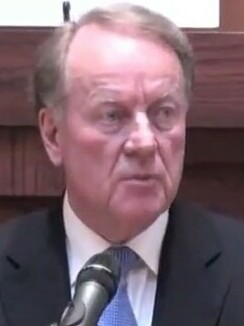
Nominee	Bill Clinton	Sheffield Nelson
Party	Democratic	Republican
Popular vote	400,386	295,925
Percentage	57.49%	42.49%
- County results Clinton: 50–60% 60–70% 70–80% Nelson: 50–60% 60–70%
Governor before election
Bill Clinton
Democratic
Elected Governor
Bill Clinton
Democratic

The 1990 Arkansas gubernatorial election took place on November 6, 1990. Incumbent Democratic governor Bill Clinton won re-election in a two-way race against Democrat turned Republican Sheffield Nelson with 57.5% of the vote. This was Clinton's fourth consecutive, and fifth overall, term as Governor of Arkansas, as well as his final term (he was elected to the presidency in 1992).

Nelson had defeated Representative Tommy F. Robinson for the Republican nomination.
