= USS Harold C. Thomas =

Evarts-class destroyer escort

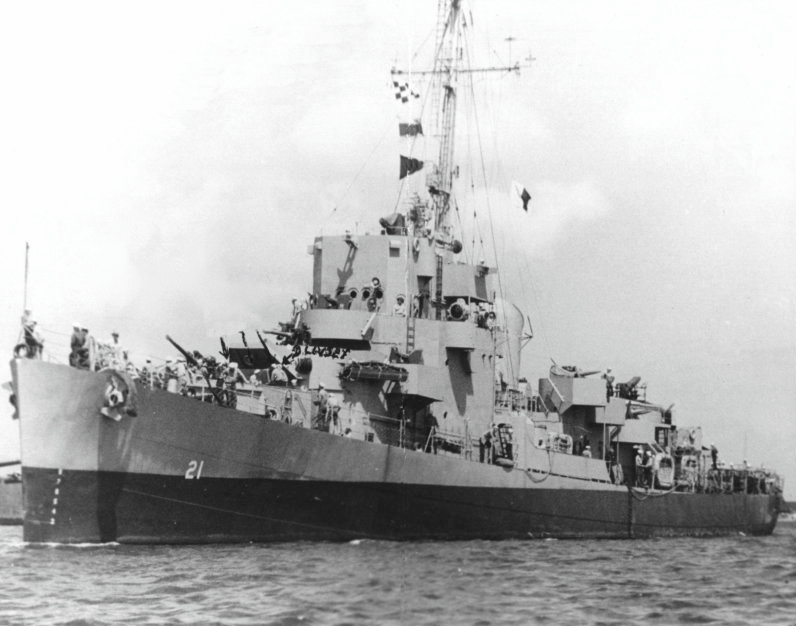
- USS Harold C. Thomas, in 1945

History

United States
- Name: USS Harold C. Thomas
- Builder: Mare Island Naval Shipyard, Vallejo, California
- Laid down: 30 April 1942
- Launched: 18 December 1942, as HMS Essington (BDE-21)
- Commissioned: 31 May 1943
- Decommissioned: 26 October 1945
- Renamed: USS Harold C. Thomas, 19 February 1943
- Stricken: 28 November 1945
- Honors and awards: 2 battle stars (World War II)
- Fate: Sold for scrapping, 25 November 1946

General characteristics
- Type: Evarts-class destroyer escort
- Displacement: 1,140 long tons (1,158 t) standard; 1,430 long tons (1,453 t) full
- Length: 289 ft 5 in (88.21 m) o/a; 283 ft 6 in (86.41 m) w/l
- Beam: 35 ft (11 m)
- Draft: 11 ft (3.4 m) (max)
- Propulsion: 4 × General Motors Model 16-278A diesel engines with electric drive, 6,000 shp (4,474 kW); 2 screws
- Speed: 19 knots (35 km/h; 22 mph)
- Range: 4,150 nmi (7,690 km)
- Complement: 15 officers and 183 enlisted
- Armament: 3 × single 3"/50 Mk.22 dual purpose guns; 1 × quad 1.1"/75 Mk.2 AA gun; 9 × 20 mm Mk.4 AA guns; 1 × Hedgehog Projector Mk.10 (144 rounds); 8 × Mk.6 depth charge projectors; 2 × Mk.9 depth charge tracks

USS Harold C. Thomas (DE-21) was an Evarts-class destroyer escort constructed for the United States Navy during World War II. It was promptly sent off into the Pacific Ocean to protect convoys and other ships from Japanese submarines and fighter aircraft. At the end of the war, she returned to the United States with two battle stars.

She was launched on 18 December 1942 by the Mare Island Naval Shipyard, Vallejo, California, as HMS Essington (BDE-21) for the British Royal Navy; later designated for U.S. Navy use; and commissioned on 31 May 1943. The ship was renamed Harold C. Thomas after a sailor killed aboard USS Boise during the Battle of Cape Esperance.

== Design ==
The Evarts-class destroyer escorts were 289 ft 5 in (88.21 m) long overall, and they had a beam of 35 ft 2 in (10.72 m). They had an average draft of 10 ft 1 in (3.07 m) at their full load displacement of 1,416 long tons (1,439 t). Each ship had a normal crew numbered 156 officers and sailors.

Harold C. Thomas was propelled by a pair of diesel motors manufactured by General Motors, which drove a pair of screw propellers. Her propulsion system was rated to produce 6,000 brake horsepower (4,500 kW) for a top speed of 19.5 knots (36.1 km/h; 22.4 mph). Oil storage amounted to between 131 and 197 long tons (133 and 200 t), which allowed a cruising radius of up to 6,000 nautical miles (11,000 km; 6,900 mi) at an economical pace of 10 knots (19 km/h; 12 mph).

The ship's armament consisted of a main battery of three 3-inch (76 mm) /50-caliber guns in individual pivot mounts, which could be used against air or surface targets. These were supported by a light anti-aircraft battery that initially consisted of four 1.1 in (28 mm) /75-caliber guns in a quadruple mount and nine 20 mm (0.79 in) Oerlikon guns. For attacks against submarines, the ship was equipped with a Hedgehog mortar, eight depth charge throwers, and two depth charge racks.

== Service history ==
After three voyages escorting merchantmen from San Francisco, California, to Pearl Harbor, Harold C. Thomas served with ComSubTraPac from 2 to 20 November 1943. Sailing from Pearl Harbor on 20 November with a convoy of merchantmen and cargo ships, she reached Abemama, Gilbert Islands, on 28 November, a week after Vice Admiral Raymond A. Spruance began the occupation of those islands. Harold C. Thomas spent the rest of the year in the Gilberts on patrol and escort duty.

After undergoing availability early in 1944, Harold C. Thomas sailed as flagship for Escort Division 10, on 29 February. Reaching Eniwetok, Marshall Islands, on 11 March, she did escort work until 30 March when she became part of a hunter-killer carrier group on anti-submarine patrol east of the Marshalls. Returning to Pearl Harbor on 6 May, the destroyer escort spent the remainder of the year in the vital but unsung work of shepherding merchantmen, cargo ships, and transports through the back staging area, up to their assembly points for invasion forces. This duty took Harold C. Thomas to the Marshall, Admiralty, Palau, and Marianas Islands. She also performed some submarine training work at Pearl Harbor. On 21 November Harold C. Thomas rescued seven men from a PBM flying boat which had crashed at sea off Majuro Atoll.

Departing Pearl Harbor on 21 January 1945, she reached San Francisco, California, six days later and proceeded to San Diego, California, for badly needed repairs. Harold C. Thomas returned to Pearl Harbor on 5 April and spent the rest of the war in submarine training and escort duty. The long Pacific war ended on 2 September with the signing of the unconditional surrender on board USS Missouri in Tokyo Bay, and Harold C. Thomas sailed for the United States 20 days later, putting into San Pedro, Los Angeles, on 27 September.

She decommissioned on 26 October 1945. She was sold to the Pacific Bridge Co., San Francisco, California, on 25 November 1946 and was scrapped on 26 March 1947.

== Awards ==
- Combat Action Ribbon (retroactive)
- American Campaign Medal
- Asiatic-Pacific Campaign Medal (with two service stars)
- World War II Victory Medal
