= Todd Turner =

- Born: Raleigh, North Carolina, US
- Education: BA, 1973, University of North Carolina-Chapel Hill; MA, sports administration, Ohio State University
- Spouse: Sara Newbold

William Tarlton "Todd" Turner is a former athletic director of the University of Washington.

== Early life and education ==
Turner was born and raised in Raleigh, North Carolina and graduated from University of North Carolina at Chapel Hill and Ohio University.

== Career ==
Upon graduating from Ohio State University, Turner accepted an athletic director (AD) position at the University of Connecticut from 1987 to 1990. He left the institution in 1990 to accept a similar position at N.C. State. He remained at N.C. State until 1996. Turner resigned from his AD position at the University of Washington in 2008 after three-and-a-half-years.

== Personal life ==
Turner and his wife Sara Newbold, who is also from Raleigh, have four children together.
