= Robert H. Dudley =

American judge (1933–2023)

Robert Hamilton Dudley (November 18, 1933 – April 1, 2023) was an American judge who was a justice of the Arkansas Supreme Court from 1981 to 1996.

== Life and career ==
Dudley was born in Jonesboro, Arkansas on November 18, 1933. He attended Arkansas State College for a year, and worked in the United States Senate stationery office while attending George Washington University for a time. He received a his law degree from the University of Arkansas at Fayetteville in 1958. Dudley engaged in the private practice of law until 1964, when he was elected as a prosecuting attorney. He was elected to a chancery court seat in 1970, and then to the state supreme court in 1980. Dudley retired from the court in 1996.

Dudley married twice, first to Sally Wentzel of New York, with whom he had four children before their divorce in 1985, and then to Mary Lynn Schwarz, in 1991. He died on April 1, 2023, at the age of 89.

Political offices
| Preceded by Richard Mays | Justice of the Arkansas Supreme Court; 1981–1996 | Succeeded by Ray Thornton |
