= Ray Thornton =

American politician and judge from Arkansas (1928–2016)

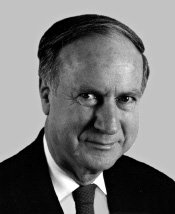

Associate Justice of the Arkansas Supreme Court
- In office 1997–2004
- Preceded by: Robert H. Dudley
- Succeeded by: Jim Gunter

Member of the U.S. House of Representatives from Arkansas's 2nd district
- In office January 3, 1991 – January 1, 1997
- Preceded by: Tommy F. Robinson
- Succeeded by: Vic Snyder

Member of the U.S. House of Representatives from Arkansas's 4th district
- In office January 3, 1973 – January 3, 1979
- Preceded by: David Pryor
- Succeeded by: Beryl Anthony Jr.

48th Attorney General of Arkansas
- In office January 12, 1971 – January 9, 1973
- Governor: Dale Bumpers
- Preceded by: Joe Purcell
- Succeeded by: Jim Guy Tucker

Personal details
- Born: Raymond Hoyt Thornton Jr. July 16, 1928 Conway, Arkansas, U.S.
- Died: April 13, 2016 (aged 87) Little Rock, Arkansas, U.S.
- Party: Democratic
- Education: Yale University

Raymond Hoyt Thornton Jr. (July 16, 1928 – April 13, 2016) was an American attorney and politician. He was a Democratic U.S. Representative for Arkansas's 4th congressional district from 1973 to 1979 and the 2nd district from 1991 to 1997. He served as an associate justice on the Arkansas Supreme Court from 1997 to 2004.

== Life and career ==
Thornton was born in Conway, Arkansas, on July 16, 1928, to Wilma Stephens and Raymond Thornton. A graduate of Sheridan High School, Thornton earned a degree in political science from Yale University and, later, a Juris Doctor from the University of Arkansas School of Law at Fayetteville, Arkansas. He served in the United States Navy during the Korean War, including service on the aircraft carrier USS Philippine Seat (CV-47), and reached the rank of lieutenant.

Thornton returned to law school after returning from Korea and graduated in 1956, the same year he married Betty Jo Mann of Sheridan, Arkansas, his wife for 60 years. For more than 13 years, Thornton served as General Counsel for Stephens Inc. and Arkansas Louisiana Gas Co., businesses owned by his maternal uncle Wilton (Witt) Stephens. He left the private sector to seek public office and was elected as Arkansas Attorney General in 1970. He was elected two years later to Congress. He defeated fellow Democrats Richard S. Arnold of Texarkana and Richard Mays, El Dorado in the primary, with no Republican in the race. All three were lawyers and remained lifelong friends. Thornton went on to serve three terms in the House. He distinguished himself as a member of the Judiciary Committee, which considered articles of impeachment against President Richard Nixon. He was among three southern Democrats and four moderate Republicans who drafted the articles adopted by the committee.

Thornton did not run for a fourth term in the House. Instead, he ran for the Senate but narrowly lost a runoff berth in the Democratic primary to his colleague from the Second District, Jim Guy Tucker, and his colleague from the Fourth District who had also served two terms as Arkansas Governor, David Pryor, with Governor Pryor prevailing in the primary and with only nominal Republican opposition in November.

After his defeat in the Senate race, Thornton became involved in education, leading a consortium for cooperative academics at Henderson State University and Ouachita Baptist University, located side-by-side in Arkadelphia, Arkansas. Then he served from 1980 to 1984 as the seventh President of Arkansas State University and then President of the University of Arkansas System from 1984 to 1990. In 1990, Thornton ran for Congress in the Little Rock-based Second District, which included his birthplace of Conway, and won by a 61.5% margin over the Republican nominee, Jim Keet, then a state representative and the subsequent unsuccessful 2010 GOP gubernatorial nominee against Mike Beebe. In January 1997, after another three terms with only nominal opposition, Thornton left Congress, seeking a seat as an associate justice of the Arkansas Supreme Court, for which he was unopposed.

Thornton was elected as a justice of the Arkansas Supreme Court, serving from January 1997 to January 2005. After retiring from the court, he became the first public service fellow for the William H. Bowen School of Law at the University of Arkansas at Little Rock. In 2009, he became the first chairman of the Arkansas Lottery Commission after his appointment to a six-year term. Ready for retirement, Thornton resigned that post after serving a year, during which the Commission supervised the establishment of the Arkansas Scholarship Lottery.

Thornton died in Little Rock on April 13, 2016, at the age of 87.

== See also ==
- U.S. Term Limits, Inc. v. Thornton – in 1995, this case overturned term limits for U.S. Senators and Representatives.

Legal offices
| Preceded by Joe Purcell | Attorney General of Arkansas; 1971–1973 | Succeeded by Jim Guy Tucker |
| Preceded by Robert H. Dudley | Associate Justice of the Arkansas Supreme Court; 1997–2005 | Succeeded by Jim Gunter |
U.S. House of Representatives
| Preceded by David Pryor | Member of the U.S. House of Representatives from Arkansas's 4th congressional district January 3, 1973 – January 3, 1979 | Succeeded by Beryl Anthony Jr. |
| Preceded by Tommy F. Robinson | Member of the U.S. House of Representatives from Arkansas's 2nd congressional district January 3, 1991 – January 1, 1997 | Succeeded by Vic Snyder |
Academic offices
| Preceded by James E. Martin | President of the University of Arkansas System; 1984–1990 | Succeeded by B. Alan Sugg |
