= Sheffield Nelson =

American businessman and politician (born 1941)

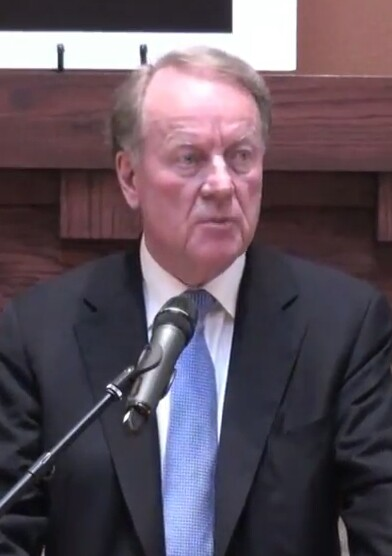
- Nelson in 2011

Chair of the Arkansas Republican Party
- In office January 1, 1991 – August 21, 1992 Serving with Asa Hutchinson
- Preceded by: Ken Coon
- Succeeded by: Asa Hutchinson

Personal details
- Born: Edward Sheffield Nelson; February 23, 1941 (age 84) Keevil, Arkansas, U.S.
- Political party: Democratic (before 1989); Republican (since 1989)
- Spouse: Mary McCastlain
- Children: 2 daughters
- Education: University of Central Arkansas (BA); University of Arkansas, Little Rock (JD)

Edward Sheffield Nelson (born February 23, 1941) is an American attorney, businessman and politician from the capital city of Little Rock, Arkansas. Originally a Democrat, Nelson in 1990 ran for governor of Arkansas as a Republican against then governor and future U.S. president Bill Clinton and in 1994 against another Democrat, the incumbent governor Jim Guy Tucker.

Nelson was born in Keevil near Brinkley in Monroe County in eastern Arkansas. He graduated from Brinkley High School and thereafter received his undergraduate degree in mathematics education from the University of Central Arkansas at Conway, where he was the student body president. He obtained a Juris Doctor degree in 1969 from the William H. Bowen School of Law at the University of Arkansas at Little Rock.

Prior to his foray into politics, he was from 1973 through 1984 the CEO of a natural gas company, Arkansas Louisiana Gas Company, since known as CenterPoint Energy. Nelson has served on the United States Commission on Civil Rights and from 2000 to 2007 on the Arkansas Game and Fish Commission under appointment from Governor Mike Huckabee. From 1990 to 1992, he was chairman of the Arkansas Republican Party. From 1992 to 2000, he was the Arkansas Republican National Committeeman, a position formerly held by Winthrop Rockefeller, the father of the GOP resurgence in Arkansas who was elected governor in 1966 and 1968.

In 1990, Nelson won the Republican gubernatorial nomination in a divisive race against Tommy F. Robinson, who then held Arkansas's 2nd congressional district seat based about Little Rock. Nelson lost in the fall to Clinton. In 1994, he sought the governorship again and narrowly won the GOP primary over state Senator Steve Luelf and businessman Bill Jones. In that campaign his events coordinator was the later State Senator Missy Irvin of Mountain View. Nelson was again defeated in the general election, 59 to 41 percent by Democratic Governor Jim Guy Tucker, who had succeeded Bill Clinton in December 1992, when Clinton resigned to become U.S. President. Nelson had openly predicted that Tucker would be indicted before the end of his elected term. Tucker was forced to resign in 1996 after his conviction in the Whitewater investigation.

Nelson has remained a prominent part of Arkansas' political scene, promoting a proposal to raise the natural gas severance tax to fund highway improvements and openly attacking the attempts of the Game and Fish Commission to exempt itself from the Arkansas Freedom of Information Act in regard to fiscal matters.

In 2015, Nelson was named by Governor Asa Hutchinson, with whom he once served as GOP co-chair, to the University of Arkansas board of trustees. Nelson is the fourth Arkansas Republican whom Bill Clinton defeated for governor; the others being Lynn Lowe, Frank D. White, and Woody Freeman.

Nelson and his wife, Mary Lynn McCastlain, an artist originally from Brinkley, reside in Little Rock. They have two daughters and thirteen grandchildren. He is currently a partner in the Little Rock law firm of Jack Nelson Jones & Bryant.

Party political offices
Preceded by Frank White	Republican nominee for Governor of Arkansas; 1990, 1994	Succeeded by Mike Huckabee
