= Arkansas Attorney General =

Chief law enforcement of Arkansas, U.S.

Attorney General of Arkansas
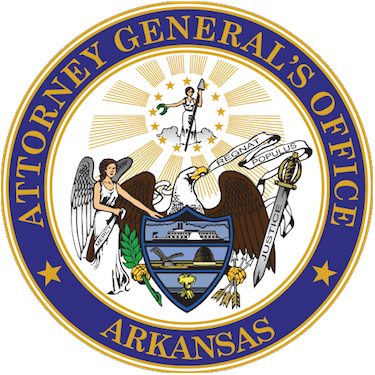
- Seal of -the Attorney General's Office

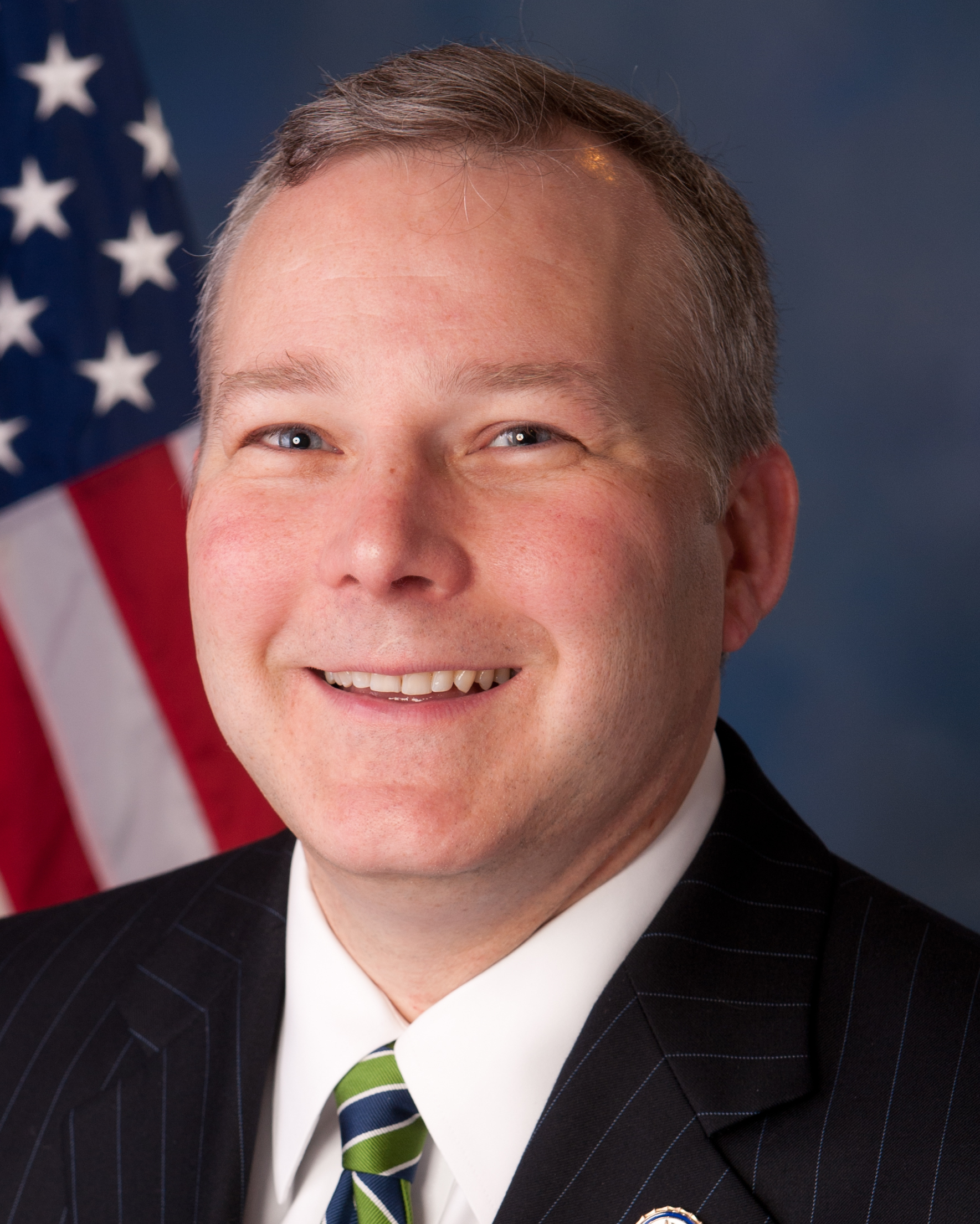
- Incumbent; Tim Griffin since January 10, 2023
- Style: Mr. Attorney General (informal); The Honorable (formal)
- Abbreviation: AG
- Seat: Attorney General's Office, Little Rock, Arkansas
- Term length: Four years, renewable once (Seventy-third Amendment to the Arkansas Constitution of 1874)
- Constituting instrument: Act 1 of 1843
- Precursor: Arkansas Attorney for the Fifth Judicial District
- Inaugural holder: Robert W. Johnson
- Formation: February 3, 1843 (183 years ago)
- Salary: US$130,000 per year (2016)
- Website: arkansasag.gov

The attorney general of Arkansas, usually known simply as the attorney general (AG), is one of Arkansas's seven constitutional officers. The officeholder serves as the state's top law enforcement officer and consumer advocate.

== History ==
The attorney general was not originally a state constitutional officer but rather was created by Act 1 of 1843, which designated the Arkansas attorney for the Fifth Judicial District as the attorney general. The first attorney general of Arkansas was Robert W. Johnson. The Arkansas Constitution of 1868 made the post elective, though it required only that the attorney general “perform such duties as are now, or may hereafter, be prescribed by law.”

This was reaffirmed in the constitution of 1874. Act 131 of 1911 laid out four general responsibilities of the attorney general's office: 1) to give opinions to state officers and agencies “upon any constitutional or other legal question that may concern the official action of said officers”; 2) to defend the interest of the state in federal court and representing all state officers, boards, and commissions in litigation involving the interests of the state; 3) to furnish any board or commission an opinion as to the validity of the title on any land they seek to purchase; and 4) to make a biennial report to the governor and the Arkansas General Assembly on all transactions of the attorney general's office.

== Role and duties ==
The attorney general represents state agencies and commissions in courts of law, giving opinions on issues presented by legislators and prosecutors, handling criminal matters and habeas corpus matters in the state, and advocating for citizens on issues pertaining to the environment, antitrust, and consumer protection.

== List of attorneys generals ==
Image	Name	Took office	Left office	Party
	Robert Ward Johnson	1843	1848	Democratic
	George C. Watkins	1848	1851	Whig, then Democratic
	John J. Clendenin	1851	1856	Democratic
	Thomas Johnson	1856	1858	Democratic
	J. L. Hollowell	1858	1861	Democratic
	P. Jordan	1861	1862	Confederate
	Sam W. Williams	1862	1864	Confederate
	Charles T. Jordan	1864	1865	Republican
	R. S. Gantt	1865	1866	Republican
	R. H. Deadman	1866	1868	Republican
	J. R. Montgomery	1868	1873	Republican
	Thomas D. W. Yonley	1873	1874	Republican
	J. L. Witherspoon	May 1874	November 1874	Democratic
	Simon P. Hughes	1874	1876	Democratic
	W. F. Henderson	1877	1881	Democratic
	C. B. Moore	1881	1885	Democratic
	Daniel Webster Jones	1885	1889	Democratic
	W. E. Atkinson	1889	1893	Democratic
	James P. Clarke	1893	1895	Democratic
	E. B. Kinsworthy	1895	1899	Democratic
	Jeff Davis	1899	1901	Democratic
	George W. Murphy	1901	1905	Democratic
	Robert L. Rogers	1905	1907	Democratic
	William F. Kirby	1907	1909	Democratic
	Hal L. Norwood	1909	1913	Democratic
	William L. Moose	1913	1915	Democratic
	Wallace Davis	1915	1917	Democratic
	John D. Arbuckle	1917	1921	Democratic
	J. S. Utley	1921	1925	Democratic
	W. H. Applegate	1925	1929	Democratic
	Hal L. Norwood	1929	1934	Democratic
	Walter L. Pope	1934	1935	Democratic
	Carl E. Bailey	1935	1937	Democratic
	Jack Holt, Sr.	1937	1943	Democratic
	Guy E. Williams	1943	1949	Democratic
	Ike Murry	1949	1953	Democratic
	Tom Gentry	1953	1957	Democratic
	Bruce Bennett	1957	1961	Democratic
	J. Frank Holt	1961	December 1962	Democratic
	Jack Holt, Jr. (acting)	December 1962	1963	Democratic
	Bruce Bennett	1963	January 10, 1967	Democratic
	Joe Purcell	January 10, 1967	January 12, 1971	Democratic
	Ray Thornton	January 12, 1971	January 9, 1973	Democratic
	Rodney Parham (acting)	January 9, 1973	January 9, 1973	Democratic
	Jim Guy Tucker	January 9, 1973	January 3, 1977	Democratic
	Billy Roy Wilson (acting)	1976	1977	Democratic
	Bill Clinton	January 3, 1977	January 9, 1979	Democratic
	Steve Clark	January 9, 1979	November 1990	Democratic
	Ron Fields (acting)	November 1990	December 1990	Democratic
	Mary Stallcup (acting)	December 1990	January 15, 1991	Democratic
	Winston Bryant	January 15, 1991	January 12, 1999	Democratic
	Mark Pryor	January 12, 1999	January 3, 2003	Democratic
	Leon Johnson (acting)	January 3, 2003	January 14, 2003	Democratic
	Mike Beebe	January 14, 2003	January 9, 2007	Democratic
	Dustin McDaniel	January 9, 2007	January 13, 2015	Democratic
	Leslie Rutledge	January 13, 2015	January 10, 2023	Republican
	Tim Griffin	January 10, 2023	Present	Republican

== See also ==
- Attorney General of the United States
