= Ed Bethune =

American politician and lawyer (born 1935)

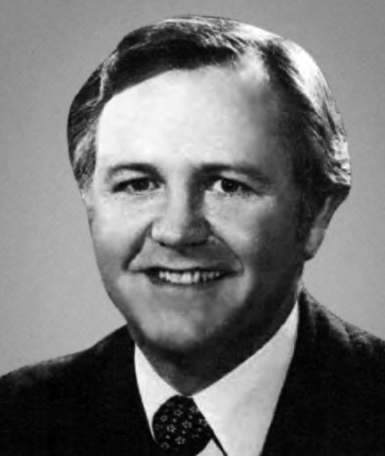

Chair of the Arkansas Republican Party
- In office 1986–1988
- Preceded by: Len Blaylock
- Succeeded by: Ken Coon

Member of the U.S. House of Representatives from Arkansas's 2nd district
- In office January 3, 1979 – January 3, 1985
- Preceded by: Jim Guy Tucker
- Succeeded by: Tommy F. Robinson

Personal details
- Born: Edwin Ruthvin Bethune Jr. December 19, 1935 (age 90) Pocahontas, Arkansas, U.S.
- Party: Republican
- Spouse: Lana Bethune
- Children: 2
- Education: University of Arkansas (BA, JD)

Military service
- Branch: United States Marine Corps
- Service years: 1954–1957
- Rank: Sergeant

Edwin Ruthvin Bethune Jr. (born December 19, 1935), known as Ed Bethune, is an American lawyer, lobbyist, Korean War veteran and novelist in Little Rock, Arkansas, who was a Republican member of the United States House of Representatives from Arkansas from 1979 to 1985.

== Early years, education, military, legal practice ==
Bethune was born to Mr. and Mrs. Edwin Bethune Sr. in Pocahontas, Arkansas. He graduated in 1953 from Pocahontas High School.

=== Korean War and college ===
He was a Sergeant in the United States Marine Corps from 1954 to 1957, with service in South Korea.

After military service, Bethune obtained his Bachelor of Arts degree in 1961 from the University of Arkansas at Fayetteville, where he was a member of Kappa Sigma fraternity. He received the Juris Doctor degree from the University of Arkansas School of Law in 1963 and was admitted to the Arkansas bar that same year.

== Career ==
That year he began his practice in Pocahontas. In 1972, while he was living in Searcy north of Little Rock, he practiced with former Arkansas Republican Party chairman Odell Pollard, who served as his political mentor. Bethune also was admitted to practice before the United States Supreme Court.

He was a prosecuting attorney for the First Judicial District of Arkansas from 1970–1971. He was chairman of the Ninth District Federal Home Loan Bank Board from 1973–1976.

== Political career ==
=== Campaign for state attorney general, 1972 ===
In 1972, Bethune was the unsuccessful Republican nominee for Arkansas attorney general against the Democrat James Guy Tucker Jr. Tucker defeated Bethune, 370,647 (60 percent) to 247,404 (40 percent).

=== Election to the U.S. House, 1978 ===
Bethune was chosen in 1979 as the president of the U.S. House Republican freshman class. He was reelected with ease in 1980—he polled 159,148 votes (78.9 percent) to 42,278 (21 percent) for his Democratic opponent, Jacksonville Mayor James G. Reid.

Once in the House, Bethune made federal taxes and spending his chief concern.

Bethune opposed Reagan's proposal to sell AWACS fighter planes to Saudi Arabia, which was against the advice of Israel. Bethune joined Senators Bumpers and Pryor to veto a proposal to override Arkansas' 10 percent interest ceiling for retail loans.

=== Election of 1982 ===
In 1982, a year of widespread election of Democrats, Bethune had a harder race. He did not begin campaigning until the final three weeks of the contest, as he had been confident of winning a third term. His opponent was the Democratic former state Senator Charles Lindbergh George Sr. (born ca. 1929), from Cabot. George was not the Democrats' first choice; party leaders failed to persuade Little Rock attorney Sandy Sidney McMath (born ca. 1942), the son of the former governor, Sidney Sanders McMath, to challenge Bethune.

Bethune survived the challenge and gained re-election: 96,775 (53.9 percent) to George's 82,913 (46.1 percent). It was his last election victory.

=== U.S. Senate campaign, 1984 ===
In 1984, Bethune sought the Senate seat against the incumbent Senator Pryor. He was decisively defeated, with Pryor receiving 502,341 votes (57.3 percent) to Bethune's 373,615 (42.7 percent).

After leaving Congress, Bethune served from 1986–1988 as the Arkansas Republican Party state Chairman. He resisted suggestions that he run for governor in 1986, and the nomination went to Frank White.

U.S. House of Representatives
Preceded by Jim Tucker	Member of the U.S. House of Representatives from Arkansas's 2nd congressional district 1979–1985	Succeeded by Tommy F. Robinson
Party political offices
Preceded by Tom Kelly	Republican nominee for U.S. Senator from Arkansas (Class 3); 1984	Vacant Title next held by Mike Huckabee; 1996, Withdrew
Preceded by Len Blaylock	Chair of the Arkansas Republican Party; 1986–1988	Succeeded by Ken Coon
U.S. order of precedence (ceremonial)
Preceded by Bradley Byrne as Former U.S. Representative	Order of precedence of the United States as Former U.S. Representative	Succeeded by Mark Siljander as Former U.S. Representative
