= Jim Guy Tucker =

American politician (1943–2025)

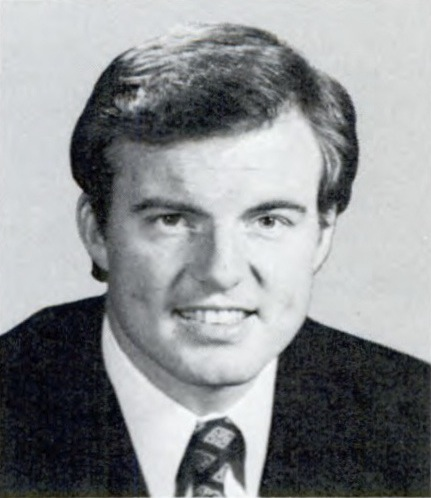
- Official portrait, 1977

43rd Governor of Arkansas
- In office December 12, 1992 – July 15, 1996
- Lieutenant: Mike Huckabee
- Preceded by: Bill Clinton
- Succeeded by: Mike Huckabee

15th Lieutenant Governor of Arkansas
- In office January 15, 1991 – December 12, 1992
- Governor: Bill Clinton
- Preceded by: Winston Bryant
- Succeeded by: Mike Huckabee (1993)

Member of the U.S. House of Representatives from Arkansas's 2nd district
- In office January 3, 1977 – January 3, 1979
- Preceded by: Wilbur Mills
- Succeeded by: Ed Bethune

49th Attorney General of Arkansas
- In office January 9, 1973 – January 3, 1977
- Governor: Dale Bumpers; David Pryor
- Preceded by: Ray Thornton
- Succeeded by: Bill Clinton

Personal details
- Born: James Guy Tucker Jr. June 13, 1943 Oklahoma City, Oklahoma, U.S.
- Died: February 13, 2025 (aged 81) Little Rock, Arkansas, U.S.
- Resting place: Mount Holly Cemetery, Little Rock, Arkansas
- Party: Democratic
- Spouse: Betty Allen (m. 1975)
- Children: 2
- Education: Harvard University (AB); University of Arkansas (JD)

Military service
- Branch: United States Marine Corps
- Years: 1964 (Note: Medically discharged.)
- Rank: Candidate
- Unit: Marine Corps Reserve; Officer Candidates School

James Guy Tucker Jr. (June 13, 1943 – February 13, 2025) was an American politician, businessman and attorney who served as the 43rd governor of Arkansas from 1992 until his resignation in 1996 after his conviction for fraud during the Whitewater affair. A member of the Democratic Party, he previously served as the 15th lieutenant governor, state attorney general, and as a U.S. representative.

== Early life ==
Tucker was born in Oklahoma City on June 13, 1943, and moved to Arkansas before school age. He attended public schools in Little Rock, graduating from Hall High School in 1961. He had his first taste of politics when he ran for and was elected vice-president of Key Club International (the largest and oldest high school service organization in the United States). He served in that organization from 1960 to 1961. He received a Bachelor of Arts degree from Harvard University in 1964.

== Early career ==
Tucker served in the United States Marine Corps Reserve in 1964, but was discharged for medical reasons (chronic ulcers) after finishing the first phase of his officer candidate training class at Camp Upshur at Marine Corps Base Quantico in Quantico, Virginia. In early 1965, Tucker found passage to southeast Asia by tramp steamer from San Francisco and entered South Vietnam as an accredited freelance war correspondent.

With one brief sojourn home, he remained in the war zone through 1967, personally participating in a number of engagements. Late that year, he published Arkansas Men at War, a compendium of interviews with troops from the state he had followed into combat. The book received generally favorable reviews.

Following a brief stint as an assistant professor of American history at the American University of Beirut in Lebanon, Tucker returned to the University of Arkansas Law School in 1968 as a second-year student, graduated, and was admitted to the bar that same year.

== Law career ==
Tucker practiced as a junior associate with the Rose Law Firm, from which he ran for prosecuting attorney in 1970. He served as prosecutor for the Sixth Judicial District of Arkansas 1971–1972. In that office, he oversaw the prosecution of more than 1,000 backlogged felony cases inherited from previous administrations. He won convictions in several cases considered by local observers as "impossible" successfully to prosecute, including one kidnapping.

Twelve "guest" judges were temporarily reassigned from other circuits by the state supreme court at Tucker's request to clear the docket. He was appointed by the Governor to the Arkansas Criminal Code Revision Commission and served from 1973 to 1975, during which time he was credited with spearheading the group's broad revision of the state's criminal laws.

An investigation into police corruption he began was stymied by a county grand jury appointed by a circuit judge who was a political ally of the chief of police. However, the following year, a federal grand jury, building on Tucker's work, issued a scathing report which led to a shake-up of the department, and the resignation of the chief, senior detectives, and complicit city officials.

== Political career ==
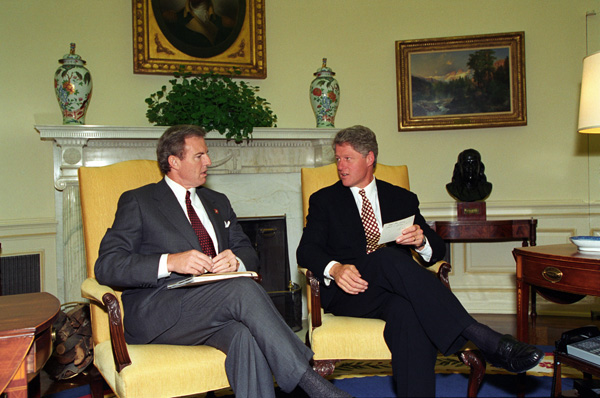
Tucker (left) meets with President Bill Clinton at the White House, 1993

Tucker was a delegate to the 1972 Democratic National Convention and was elected Arkansas Attorney General in November 1972 at the age of 29. He easily defeated the Republican nominee Edwin Bethune, then of Searcy in White County, and later Tucker's successor as the U.S. representative from Arkansas's 2nd congressional district which is Little Rock–based.

Tucker served two 2-year terms as attorney general, 1973–1977. He and the state's chief justice served as co-chairmen of the Arkansas Criminal Code Revision Commission. This was the first effort at codification of the state's criminal code and was adopted by the State's General Assembly. Tucker also began intervening in utility rate cases before the Arkansas Public Service Commission and fought to require "scrubbers" on a large coal-fired generation plant. He served as co-chairman of the Consumer Protection Committee of the National Association of Attorneys General. Running from his post as attorney general, Tucker was elected as a Democrat to the Ninety-fifth Congress and served one term from 1977 to 1979. He served on the Ways and Means Committee, on the Sub-Committee on Social Security, and on a special committee on welfare reform.

He relinquished the seat to wage an unsuccessful campaign for the United States Senate in 1978. He was defeated in the Democratic primary by the sitting governor, David Pryor. In the same election, Bill Clinton, who had replaced Tucker in 1977 as attorney general, was elected governor.

In 1979, President Jimmy Carter appointed Tucker the chairman of the White House Conference on Families, in which capacity he served until the end of the administration in January 1981.

Tucker resumed his law practice. A consistent intra-party rival of Clinton, he was defeated by Clinton when both sought the Democratic nomination for governor in 1982 following Clinton's defeat by Republican Frank White in 1980. He then became a partner in the firm of Mitchell, Williams, Selig & Tucker and served as lead trial counsel in complex litigation. Eight years later, Tucker announced his intention to run for the governor's office again against Clinton, who was seeking a fifth term and was expected to seek the Democratic nomination for president. However, he withdrew from the gubernatorial primary and ran instead for the post of lieutenant governor.

Tucker recognized that Clinton had his eyes on the presidency and might not serve a full term. Tucker, in accordance with a state constitutional provision barring a governor from executing duties while traveling outside of the state, served as acting governor on a near-constant basis between Clinton's campaign launch during the summer of 1991 and the election in November 1992, relinquishing gubernatorial powers and duties only on the few occasions when Clinton returned to the state, such as to oversee the execution of Ricky Ray Rector. Tucker succeeded to the governorship upon Clinton's resignation on December 12, 1992, following the latter's election to the presidency.

Tucker called a special session of the General Assembly that same week to solve a financial crisis for the state's Medicaid system. At his urging, the legislature adopted a soft drink tax, proceeds of which were placed in a trust account for Medicaid matching purposes. The soft drink industry obtained sufficient signatures to attempt a repeal. The soft drink tax prevailed with over 60% of the vote. Tucker won election in 1994 with over 59% of the vote against Republican Sheffield Nelson to a four-year term as governor and was sworn into a full four-year term on January 10, 1995.

== Conviction and resignation ==
Tucker was convicted of one count of conspiracy and one count of mail fraud on May 28, 1996, as part of Kenneth Starr's investigation of the Whitewater scandal. Tucker was tried with fellow defendants James B. McDougal and his wife Susan McDougal. The prosecution was conducted primarily by OIC prosecutor Ray Jahn. Tucker chose not to testify in his own defense upon the advice of his attorney. Tucker received a lenient sentence of four years' probation and house detention in part because of his poor health. He was placed on the Mayo Clinic liver transplant list in June 1996.

Arkansas, like most other states, has a provision in its state constitution barring convicted felons from elective office. As a result, Tucker announced his intention to resign. As lieutenant governor, Mike Huckabee, a Republican, was preparing to be sworn in, Tucker announced he would delay his resignation until the trial court hearing on several grounds, including the post-trial discovery that a juror in his trial was married to a man whose cocaine possession conviction Tucker had twice refused to commute. Furthermore, this juror was the niece of local activist Robert "Say" McIntosh, who had demonstrated against Tucker during the trial. He argued that his conviction was thus tainted, and that the Arkansas Constitution was vague about his status as a convicted felon until his post trial motions were ruled on. However, several hours later he did resign that same day, under the threat of impeachment by the legislature which had informally gathered to witness Huckabee's swearing in.

== Business ==
Beginning in the early 1980s, while practicing law, Tucker and his wife Betty began building cable television and pay per view systems in Central Arkansas, and later in the Dallas–Fort Worth corridor north of DFW Airport and in southern Florida. In the early 1990s, Tucker partnered with Insight Cable to purchase and expand cable television systems in London. That company later merged with others and was taken public in London. Beginning in the mid-1990s, Tucker and his wife, along with James Riady, established a cable television company in Indonesia. In 1998, in the midst of an Indonesian financial and political crisis, the company almost went bankrupt. Tucker traveled to Indonesia in January 1999 and with the Riady family created a new company called Kabelvision, and built and expanded systems in greater Jakarta ('Jabotabek'), in Surabaya, and in Bali. In 2000, the company was merged into new company called AcrossAsia Multimedia Ltd. It was listed on the Global Emerging Markets (GEM) Exchange in Hong Kong that same year. With AcrossAsia Multimedia, they built what was then the largest cable TV and Internet infrastructure in Indonesia.

== Personal life ==
In 1975, Tucker married Betty Allen; they had two children and he became stepfather to her two children from a prior marriage.

=== Illness and death ===
Beginning during his college years at Harvard, Tucker suffered from an autoimmune disease, later diagnosed as Primary sclerosing cholangitis. It created severe liver problems which seriously debilitated him and threatened his life (he had nearly died from gastrointestinal bleeding in 1994, and had steadily worsened since). On Christmas Day 1996, Tucker received a liver transplant at the Mayo Clinic in Rochester, Minnesota.

Tucker began hospice care in January 2025, and died at a Little Rock hospital from complications of ulcerative colitis on February 13, 2025, at the age of 81.

His funeral was held on February 24, 2025, at Second Presbyterian Church in Little Rock, and was buried at Mount Holly Cemetery in Little Rock.

=== Legacy ===
In 2012, Tucker donated the James Guy Tucker Jr. Papers, a collection of manuscripts and materials documenting his personal life and political career, to the University of Arkansas at Little Rock. The collection went on display and became open to the public in 2017. A star in the Columba constellation was nicknamed after Tucker in the International Star Registry.

After his death, as a former governor and U.S. representative, Tucker would lie in state at the Arkansas State Capitol building on February 21, 2025 and state flags were lowered to half staff from February 19 to February 24, 2025.

== See also ==
- List of governors of Arkansas

== Footnotes ==
Legal offices
Preceded by Ray Thornton	Attorney General of Arkansas; 1973–1977	Succeeded by Bill Clinton
U.S. House of Representatives
Preceded by Wilbur Mills	Member of the U.S. House of Representatives from Arkansas's 2nd congressional district 1977–1979	Succeeded by Edwin Bethune
Party political offices
Preceded by Winston Bryant	Democratic nominee for Lieutenant Governor of Arkansas; 1990	Succeeded by Nate Coulter
Preceded by Bill Clinton	Democratic nominee for Governor of Arkansas; 1994	Succeeded by Bill Bristow
Political offices
Preceded by Winston Bryant	Lieutenant Governor of Arkansas; 1991–1992	Succeeded by Mike Huckabee
Preceded by Bill Clinton	Governor of Arkansas; 1992–1996	Succeeded by Mike Huckabee
