= Winston Bryant =

American politician (born 1938)

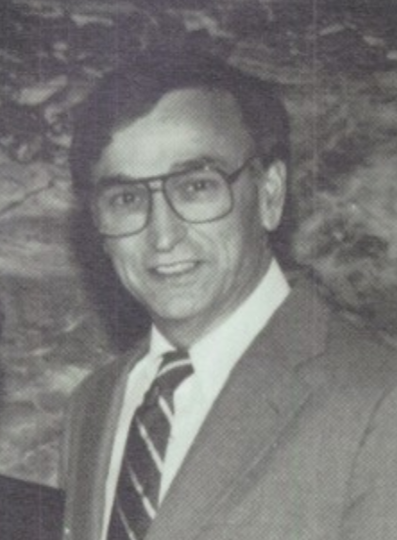

14th Lieutenant Governor of Arkansas
- In office January 19, 1981 – January 15, 1991
- Governor: Frank D. White; Bill Clinton
- Preceded by: Joe Purcell
- Succeeded by: Jim Guy Tucker

27th Chair of the National Lieutenant Governors Association
- In office 1986–1987
- Preceded by: John Mutz
- Succeeded by: George Ryan

52nd Attorney General of Arkansas
- In office January 15, 1991 – January 12, 1999
- Governor: Bill Clinton; Jim Guy Tucker; Mike Huckabee
- Preceded by: Steve Clark
- Succeeded by: Mark Pryor

Secretary of State of Arkansas
- In office 1977–1979
- Governor: David Pryor
- Preceded by: George O. Jernigan Jr.
- Succeeded by: Paul Riviere

Personal details
- Born: October 3, 1938 (age 87) Malvern, Arkansas, U.S.
- Party: Democratic
- Spouse: Susan Hughes Bryant
- Education: Ouachita Baptist University (BA); University of Arkansas (LLB); George Washington University (LLM)

Military service
- Allegiance: United States of America
- Branch/service: United States Army
- Years of service: 1963–1965
- Rank: Captain
- Battles/wars: Vietnam War

Winston Bryant (born October 3, 1938) is an American politician and attorney who served as the secretary of State of Arkansas (1977–1978), the 14th lieutenant governor of Arkansas (1981–1991) and Arkansas attorney general (1991–1999).

== Early life and education ==
He was born in Malvern, Arkansas. In 1960, Bryant graduated from Ouachita Baptist University in Arkadelphia. He graduated in 1963 from University of Arkansas School of Law in Fayetteville. He received a Master of Laws in Administrative Law from George Washington University Law School in 1970.

== Career ==
Bryant served as a legislative assistant to the late U.S. Senator John L. McClellan from 1968 to 1971. Thereafter, he was a prosecuting attorney in his native Hot Spring County and a member of the Arkansas House of Representatives from 1973 to 1977.

Elected Secretary of State in 1976, he vacated the office after one term, describing it as "a glorified janitor's job." He unsuccessfully ran for the U.S. House of Representatives from Arkansas' Fourth District on 1978 which was being vacated by Ray Thornton, who ran for the U.S. Senate. Bryant led the five-man primary, but lost in a runoff to Union County Prosecuting Attorney Beryl Anthony Jr. He was elected lieutenant governor in 1980 and served one term under Republican governor Frank White and four terms under Democrat Bill Clinton before being elected attorney general in 1990. He won 55–45% for the post over future Congressman and governor Asa Hutchinson, and was renominated in the 1994 Democratic primary 58-42% over State Representative (and future U.S. Senator) Mark Pryor. Bryant triumphed in the ordinarily heavily Republican year by a margin of 80–20% over his GOP opponent, Dan Ivy, a controversial attorney and former Democrat.

While serving as attorney general, Bryant waged two separate campaigns for the United States Senate. In 1996, he ran for the seat being vacated by Senator David Pryor. He received the Democratic nomination in a close runoff primary against State Senator and future University of Central Arkansas president Lu Hardin, but lost in a close race to Republican Congressman Tim Hutchinson. When Arkansas's other senator, Dale Bumpers, retired before the 1998 election, Bryant once again ran in the Democratic primary. He placed second in the initial balloting, and lost the run-off to former Representative Blanche Lincoln who went on to defeat Republican state Senator Fay Boozman in the general election. After his defeat by Lincoln, he finished his term as attorney general and retired to his law practice in Malvern.

== Personal life ==
He is married to the former Susan Hughes and has one son, John Bryant. He enjoyed watching his great nephews play baseball.

Political offices
Preceded by George O. Jernigan Jr.	Secretary of State of Arkansas; 1977 - 1979	Succeeded by Paul Riviere
Preceded by Joe Purcell	Lieutenant Governor of Arkansas; January 19, 1981 - January 15, 1991	Succeeded by Jim Guy Tucker
Legal offices
Preceded by Steve Clark	Attorney General of Arkansas; January 15, 1991 - January 12, 1999	Succeeded by Mark Pryor
Party political offices
Preceded by Joe Purcell	Democratic nominee for Lieutenant Governor of Arkansas; 1980, 1982, 1984, 1986	Succeeded by Jim Guy Tucker
Preceded by Steve Clark	Democratic nominee for Arkansas Attorney General; 1990, 1994	Succeeded by Mark Pryor
Preceded by David Pryor	Democratic Party nominee for United States Senator from Arkansas (Class 2); 1996	Succeeded by Mark Pryor
