= List of people from Little Rock, Arkansas =

Flag of Little Rock, Arkansas

The following people were all born in, residents of, or otherwise closely associated with Little Rock (categorized by area in which each person is best known):

== Actors, musicians and others in the entertainment industry ==
=== Actors ===
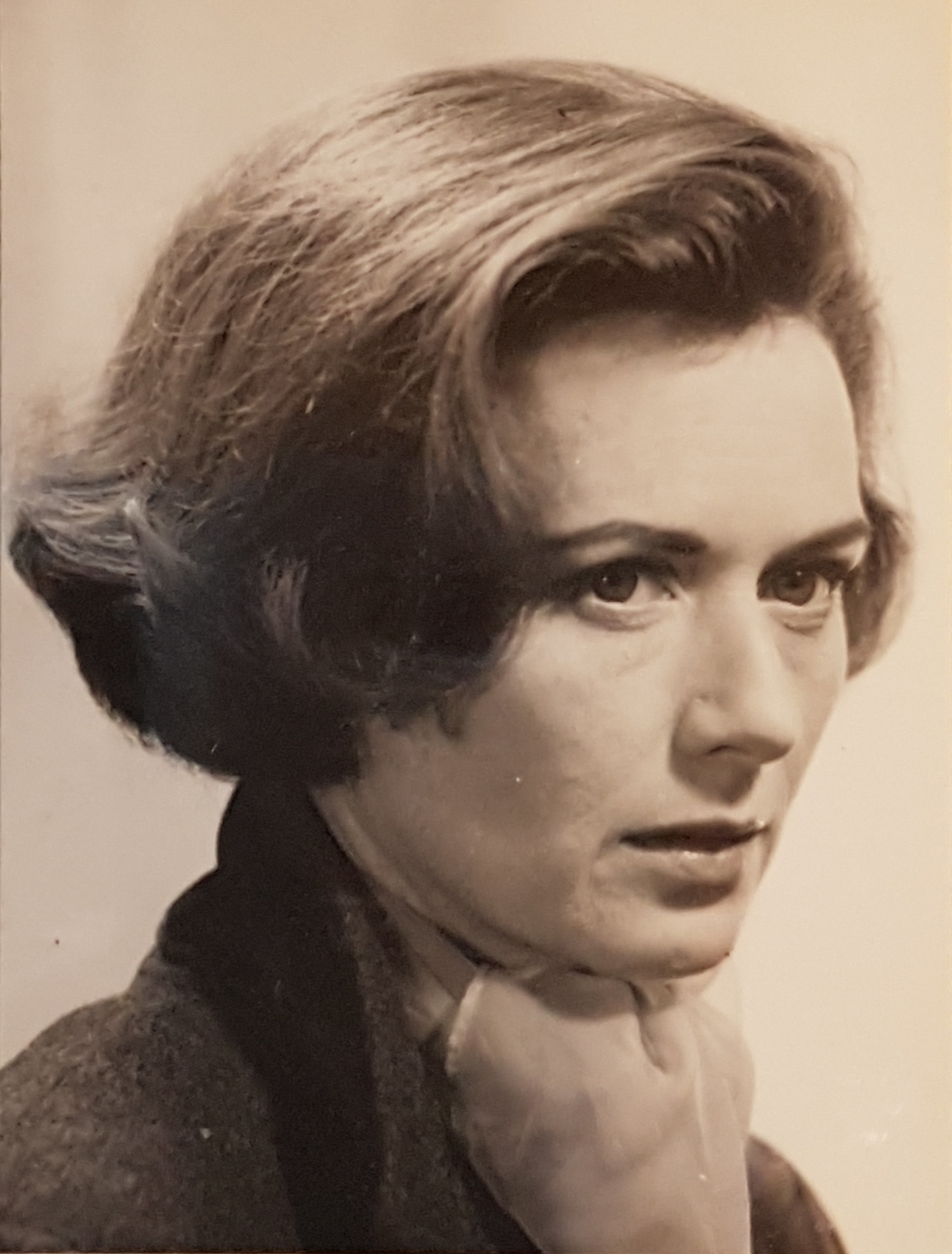
Ann Gillis

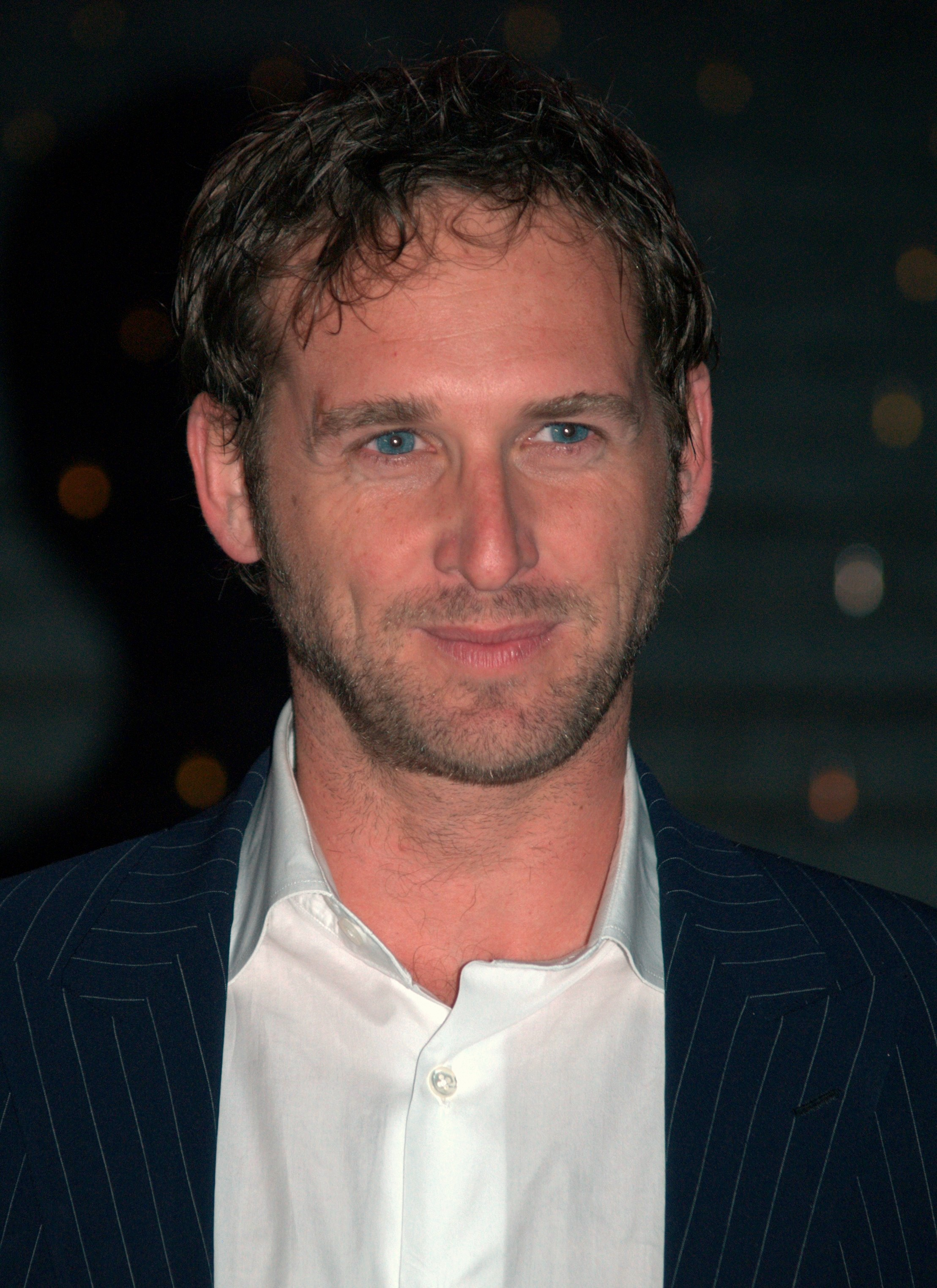
Josh Lucas

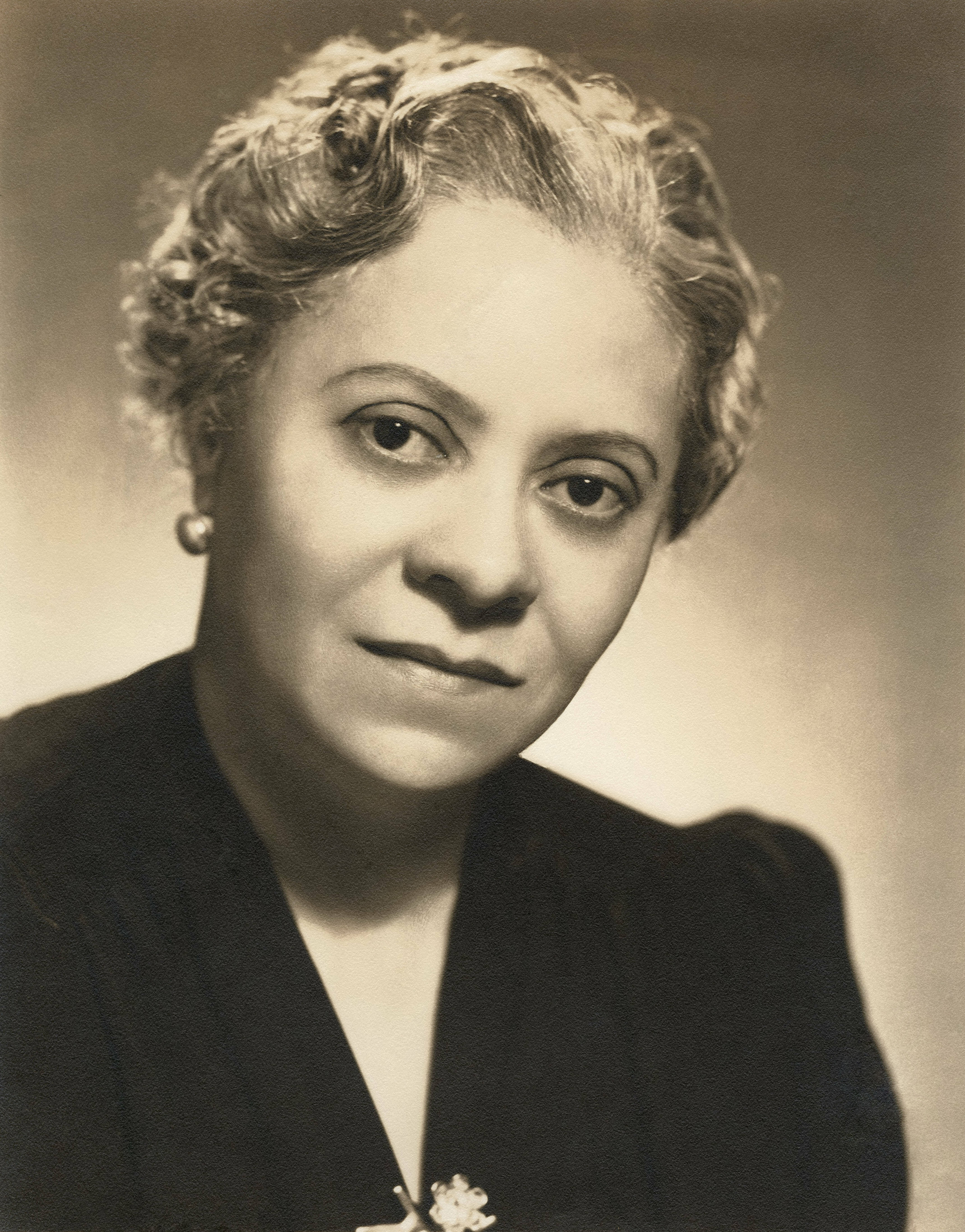
Florence Price

- Broncho Billy Anderson (1880–1971), born in Little Rock, actor, writer, director, and producer
- Frank Bonner (1942–2021), actor and television director best known for playing sales manager Herb Tarlek on the classic TV sitcom WKRP in Cincinnati
- Rodger Bumpass (born 1951), voice actor best known for playing Squidward Tentacles on the animated television series SpongeBob SquarePants
- Daniel Davis (born 1945), actor best known for playing Niles the Butler on the television program The Nanny
- Gil Gerard (born 1943), actor best known for playing Captain William "Buck" Rogers in 1979–1981 television series Buck Rogers in the 25th Century
- Ann Gillis (1927–2018), film actress of 1930s and '40s
- John LeCompt (born 1973), musician, part of Little Rock scene with bands like Evanescence
- Josh Lucas (born 1971), actor, Sweet Home Alabama, Poseidon, Glory Road; born in the city
- Roger Mobley (born 1949), child actor, Fury and Walt Disney's Wonderful World of Color; reportedly lived in the Little Rock area since 2015
- Corin Nemec (born 1971), actor best known for playing Parker Lloyd Lewis in 1990s TV series Parker Lewis Can't Lose and Jonas Quinn in Stargate SG-1
- George Newbern (born 1964), actor, Adventures in Babysitting, Father of the Bride; born in the city
- Judge Reinhold (born 1957), actor, lives in the city
- Jessica Serfaty (born 1991), actress and model

=== Music ===
- Hunter Beard (born 1981), rapper, record producer and businessman
- Richard B. Boone (1930–1999), jazz musician and scat singer
- Tammy Graham (born 1968), singer and pianist, born in the city
- Lee Elhardt Hays (1914–1981), folk singer and songwriter for The Weavers, born in the city
- Al Hibbler (1915–2001), blind singer, worked eight years with Duke Ellington before becoming a soloist; civil rights activist in 1950s and 1960s; born in the city
- Jon Hynes, classical pianist, native of the city
- SL Jones, southern rapper, born in Flint, Michigan, and raised in Little Rock
- Amy Lee (born 1981), lead singer of Evanescence
- Smokie Norful (born 1975), gospel recording artist, born in the city
- Art Porter Jr. (1961–1996), jazz saxophonist
- Art Porter Sr. (1934–1993), jazz pianist; father of jazz saxophonist Art Porter Jr.
- Florence Price (1887–1953), composer and pianist
- Cory Brandan Putman (born 1976), lead vocalist for Grammy-nominated band Norma Jean and ex-guitarist for Living Sacrifice, a metal band based in Little Rock
- Pharoah Sanders (1940–2022), jazz saxophonist
- William Grant Still (1895–1978), composer
- Jason Truby (born 1973), ex-guitarist for the band P.O.D., also in Little Rock-based band Living Sacrifice
- Jason White (born 1973), Green Day's backup guitarist (particularly for American Idiot tour and 21st Century Breakdown tour), born in Little Rock
- Lenny Williams (born 1945), R&B singer

=== Other entertainers ===
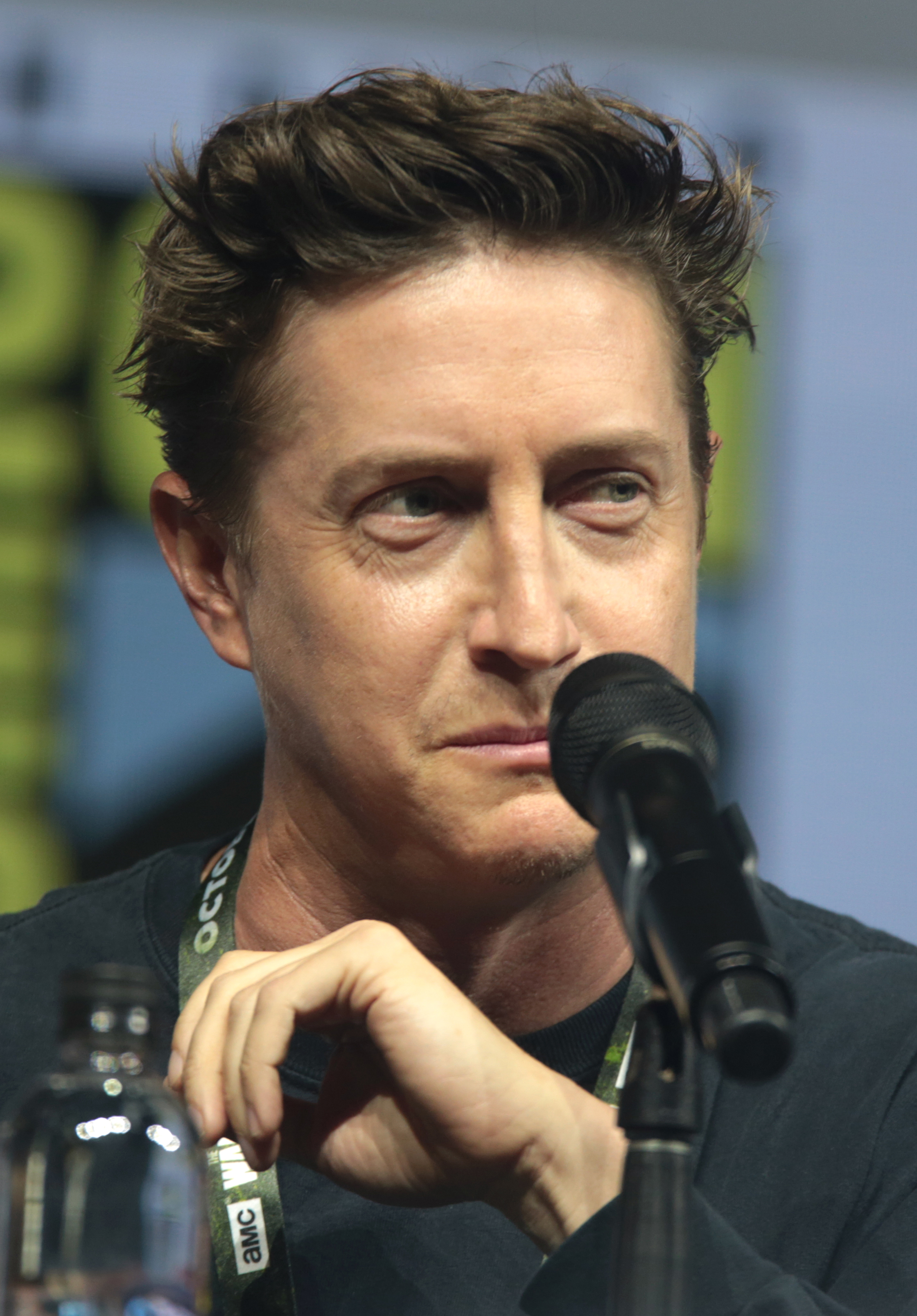
David Green

- Matt Besser (born 1967), comedian, born in the city
- Linda Bloodworth-Thomason (born 1947), film and television producer and director best known for TV series Designing Women
- John Braden (1949–2004), writer, producer, and director of movies and television programs; born in the city
- Jim Dickinson (1941–2009), record producer, pianist and singer; born in the city
- Danielle Evans (born 1985), fashion model who won Cycle 6 of UPN's America's Next Top Model
- David Gordon Green (born 1975), filmmaker, born in the city
- Bill Hicks (1961–1994), comedian, lived and died in the city
- Lil' JJ (born 1990), comedian, actor, rapper, has show on Nickelodeon called Just Jordan
- Fatima Robinson (born 1971), dance choreographer known for music videos for R&B singer Aaliyah, and in Dreamgirls
- Harry Thomason (born 1940), film and television producer and director best known for TV series Designing Women; Little Rock high school speech teacher and football coach

== Artists ==
- Catherine Tharp Altvater (1907–1984), artist and first woman to hold office in the American Watercolor Society, born in Little Rock
- Charlotte Moorman (1933–1991), cellist, performance artist, and advocate for avant-garde music; born in Little Rock

== Athletes ==
=== Baseball ===
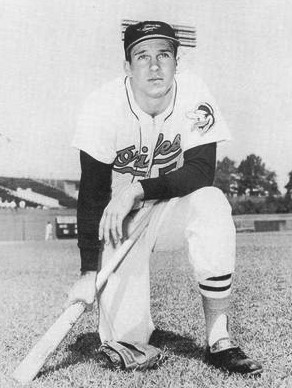
Brooks Robinson

- Glenn Abbott (born 1951), baseball player who pitched in the Major Leagues 1973–1981 and 1983–1984; born in the city
- Bill Dickey (1907–1993), Major League Baseball player and manager in the Baseball Hall of Fame; lived much of his life in the city
- Randy Jackson (1926–2019), Major League Baseball player
- Kevin McReynolds (born 1959), outfielder/designated hitter who played for San Diego Padres and New York Mets; born in the city
- Brooks Robinson (1937–2023), began his career at Lamar Porter Field, Hall of Fame third baseman for Baltimore Orioles 1955–1977; born in Little Rock in 1937
- Drew Smyly (born 1989), Major League Baseball pitcher

=== Basketball ===
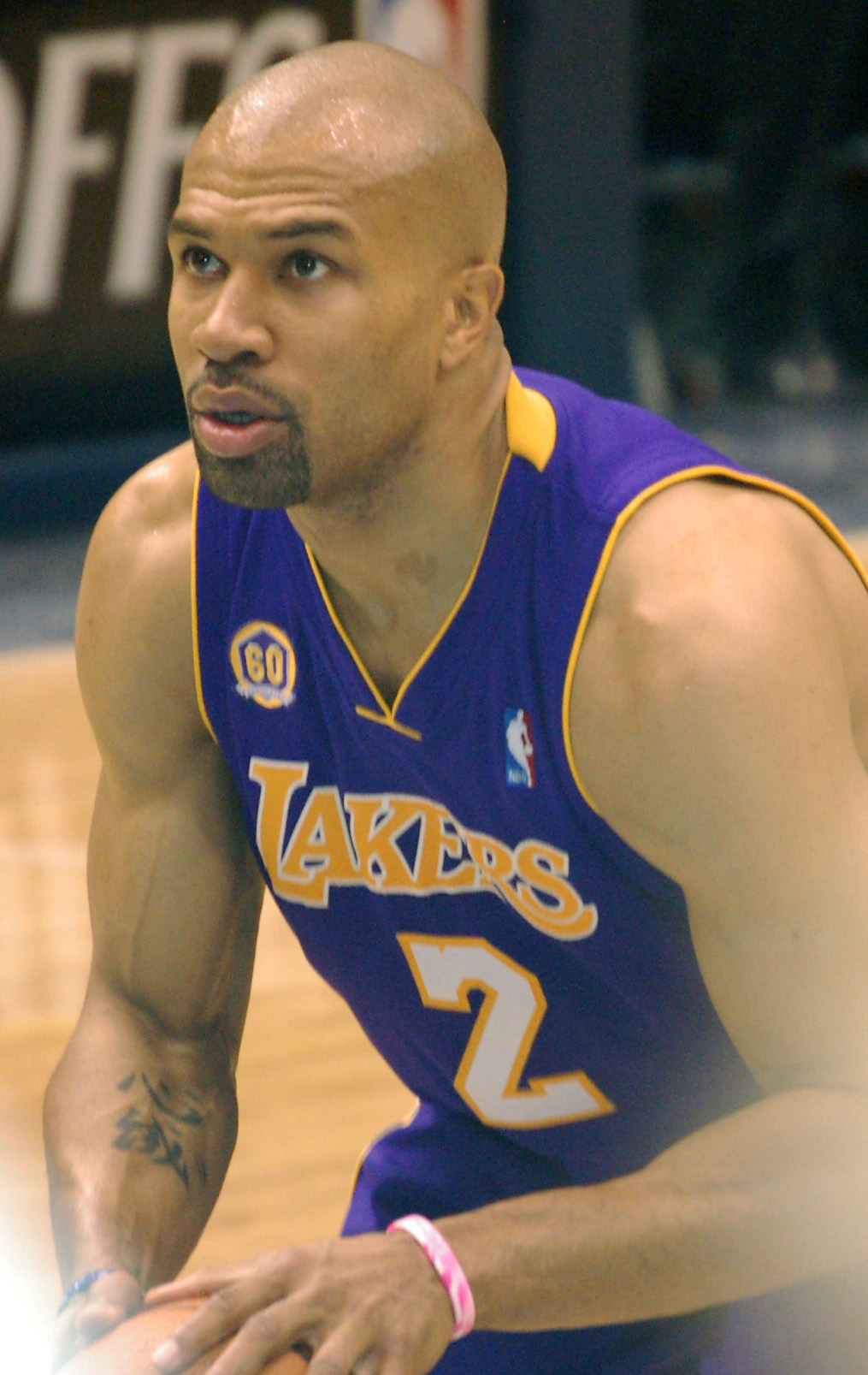
Derek Fisher

- Hubert Ausbie (born 1938), longtime player with the Harlem Globetrotters
- Derek Fisher (born 1974), professional basketball player for the Los Angeles Lakers and Oklahoma City Thunder, former head coach for the New York Knicks
- Dusty Hannahs (born 1993), basketball player in the Israeli Basketball Premier League
- Joe Johnson (born 1981), NBA basketball player
- Daryl Macon (born 1995), basketball player for Maccabi Tel Aviv of the Israeli Basketball Premier League
- Sidney Moncrief (born 1957), basketball player for Arkansas Razorback and NBA's Milwaukee Bucks; born in Little Rock in 1957

=== Football ===
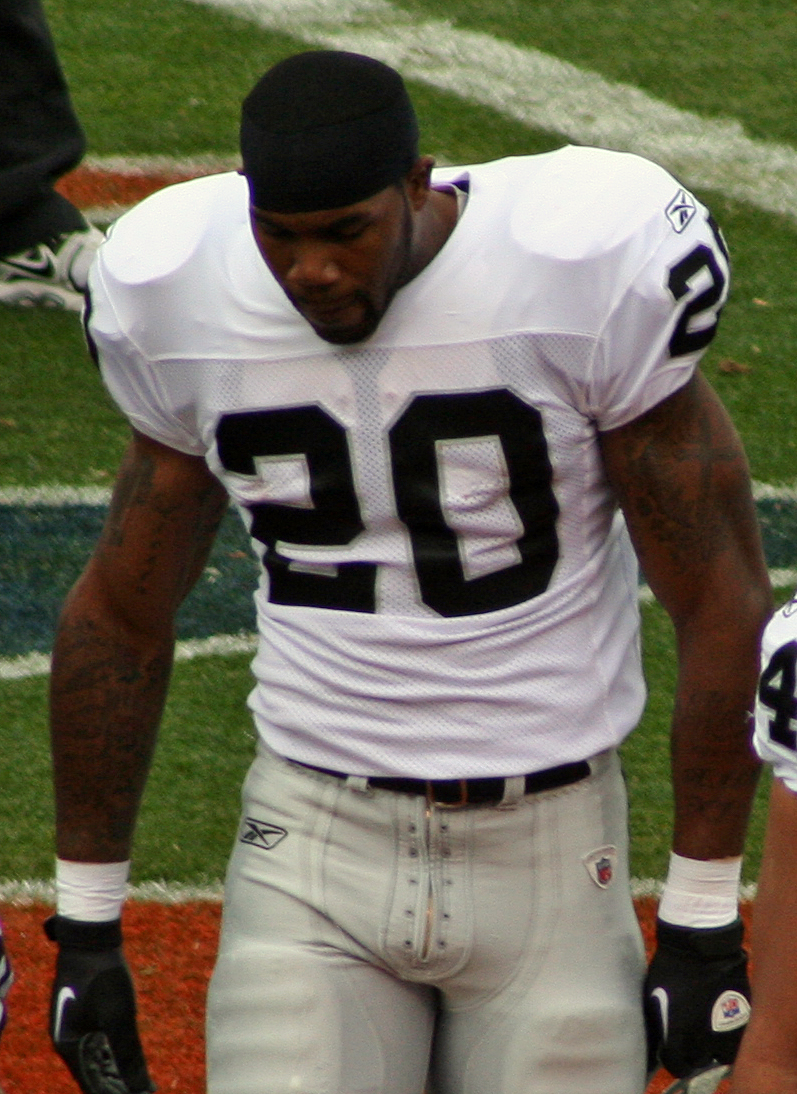
Darren McFadden

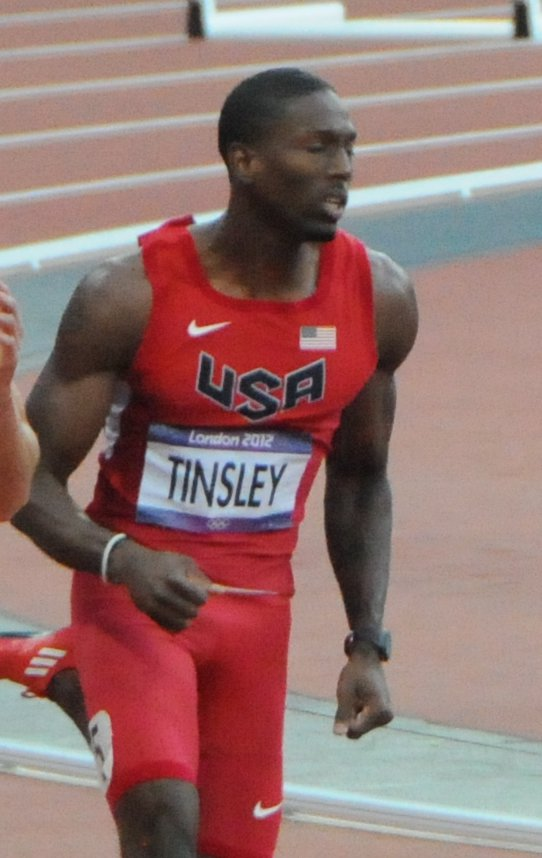
Michael Tinsley

- Jamaal Anderson (born 1986), defensive end for the Indianapolis Colts of the NFL; former high school football star for Little Rock Parkview
- Walt Coleman, National Football League referee and owner and operator of Coleman Dairy; known for playoff game between Oakland Raiders and New England Patriots which incorporated the "Tuck Rule"
- August Curley (born 1960), NFL player
- Steve Foley (born 1975), professional linebacker for the San Diego Chargers; former resident
- Chris Harris (born 1982), NFL player
- Hunter Henry (born 1994), NFL tight end
- Keith Jackson (born 1965), NFL player for the Philadelphia Eagles, Miami Dolphins, and Green Bay Packers
- Jerry Jones (born 1942), owner of the Dallas Cowboys
- Ken Kavanaugh (1916–2007), professional football player, 1940–1950, for the Chicago Bears
- Darren McFadden (born 1987), running back for the Dallas Cowboys of the National Football League; born in the city
- Houston Nutt (born 1957), coach of University of Arkansas Razorbacks football team 1997–2007, also coached Ole Miss; born in Little Rock
- Lawrence Phillips (1975–2016), American and Canadian football running back; born in the city; died in prison
- Vince Warren (born 1963), NFL wide receiver, member of New York Giants' winning Super Bowl team

=== Other sports ===
- Bobo Brazil (1924–1998), African-American professional wrestler
- Kortney Clemons (born 1980), Paralympic athlete and Iraq War veteran
- Glen Day (born 1965), PGA Tour golfer, winner of 1999 Heritage at Hilton Head, South Carolina
- Rolando Delgado (born 1981), mixed martial artist
- John Kocinski (born 1967), motorcycle road racer, won 1990 250cc World Championship and 1997 World Superbike title; born in the city
- Gene Ratliff (born 1956), Light Heavyweight Golden Gloves 1975 National Champion
- Jermain Taylor (born 1978), professional boxer and Middleweight Champion of the World in 2005; born in the city
- Michael Tinsley (born 1984), professional track runner specializing in the 400m hurdles; silver medalist at the 2012 Summer Olympics and the 2013 World Championships.

== Writers, journalists ==
- Margot Adler (1946–2014), journalist; born in Little Rock
- Daisy Bates (1914–1999), civil rights leader, journalist, publisher, and author; lived in the city
- Joe Bob Briggs, pseudonym and persona of John Irving Bloom (born 1953), a syndicated film critic, writer and actor; was raised in the city
- Dee Brown (1908–2002), novelist and historian whose most famous work is Bury My Heart at Wounded Knee; grew up partly in the city
- Helen Gurley Brown (1922–2012), author, publisher, and businesswoman who was editor-in-chief of Cosmopolitan magazine for 32 years; lived in the city
- John Gould Fletcher (1886–1950), Pulitzer Prize-winning Imagist poet and author; born in the city
- Fred Graham (1931–2019), chief anchor and managing editor of Court TV; born in the city
- E. Lynn Harris (1955–2009), gay, black author with five novels that hit The New York Times Best Seller list; was raised in Little Rock
- Mercer Mayer (born 1943), author and illustrator of children's book Little Critter series and There's a Nightmare in My Closet
- Robert Palmer (1945–1997), a journalist, author of books about music and a musician; born in the city
- Charles Portis (1933–2020), novelist; born in El Dorado but lived most of his life in the city
- Alison Rogers (born 1966), journalist and real estate broker, author of Diary of a Real Estate Rookie; born and raised in Little Rock
- Charles Willeford (1919–1988), author of detective novels and other books; born in the city

== Politics, government, military ==
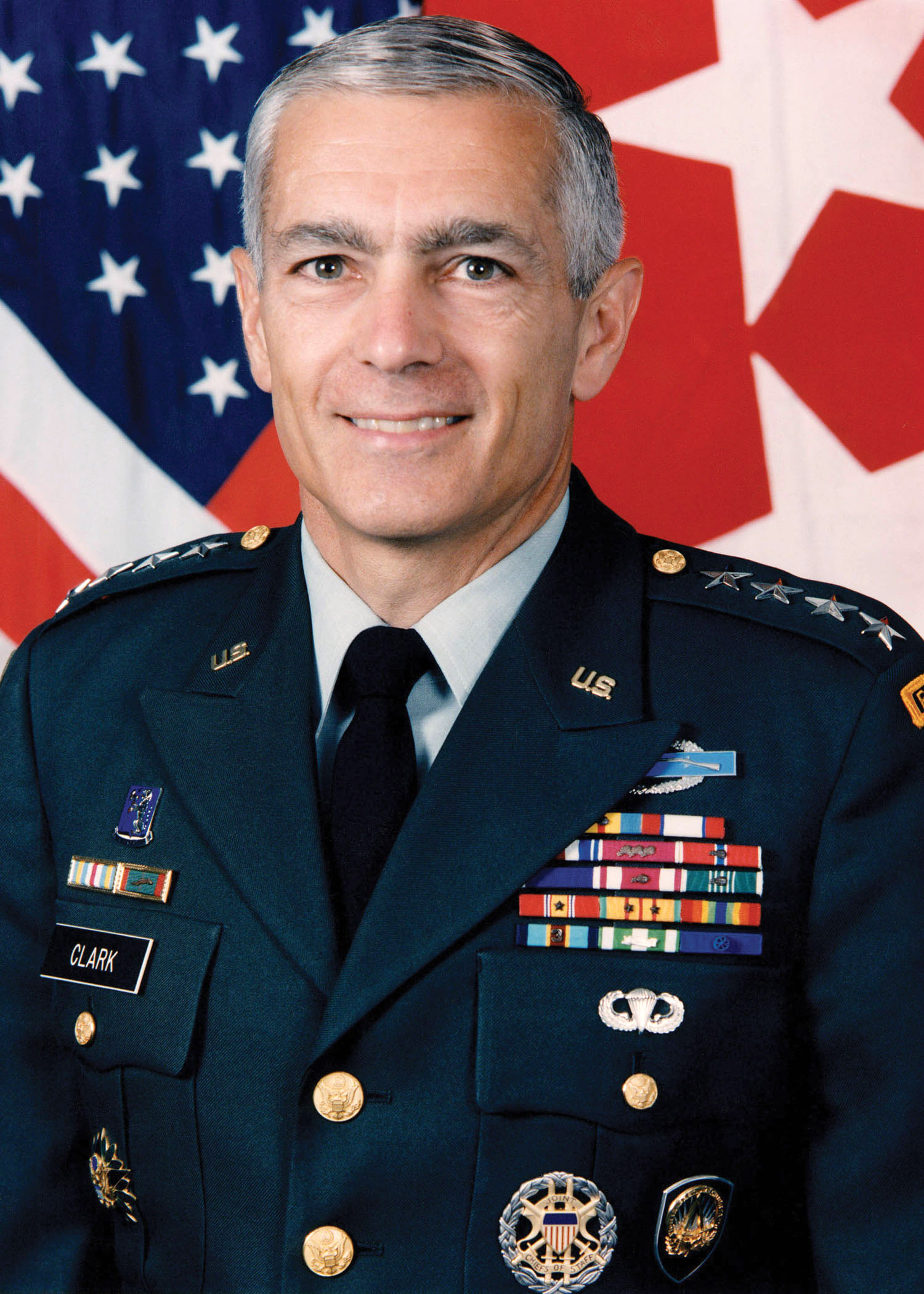
Wesley Clark

Bill Clinton

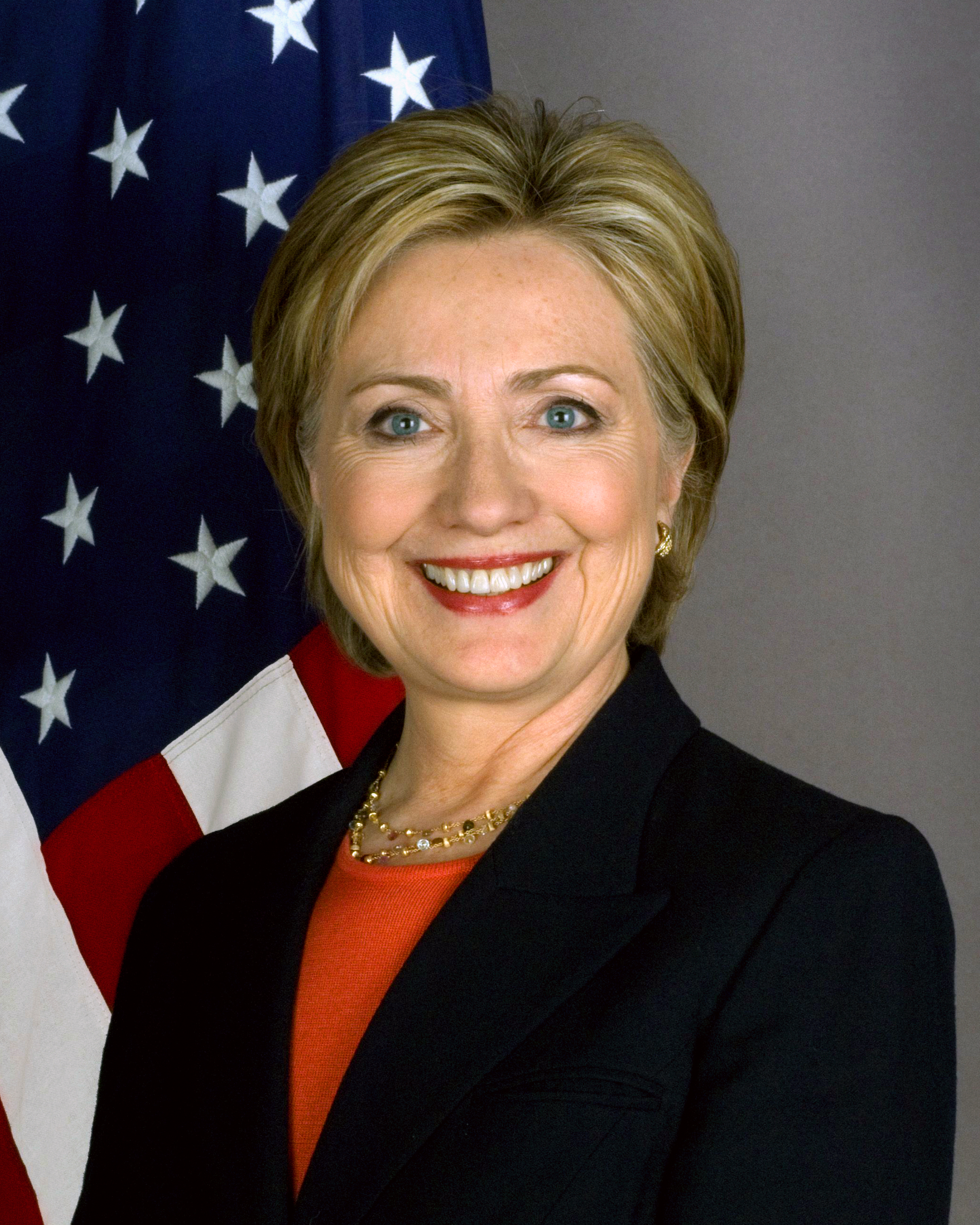
Hillary Clinton

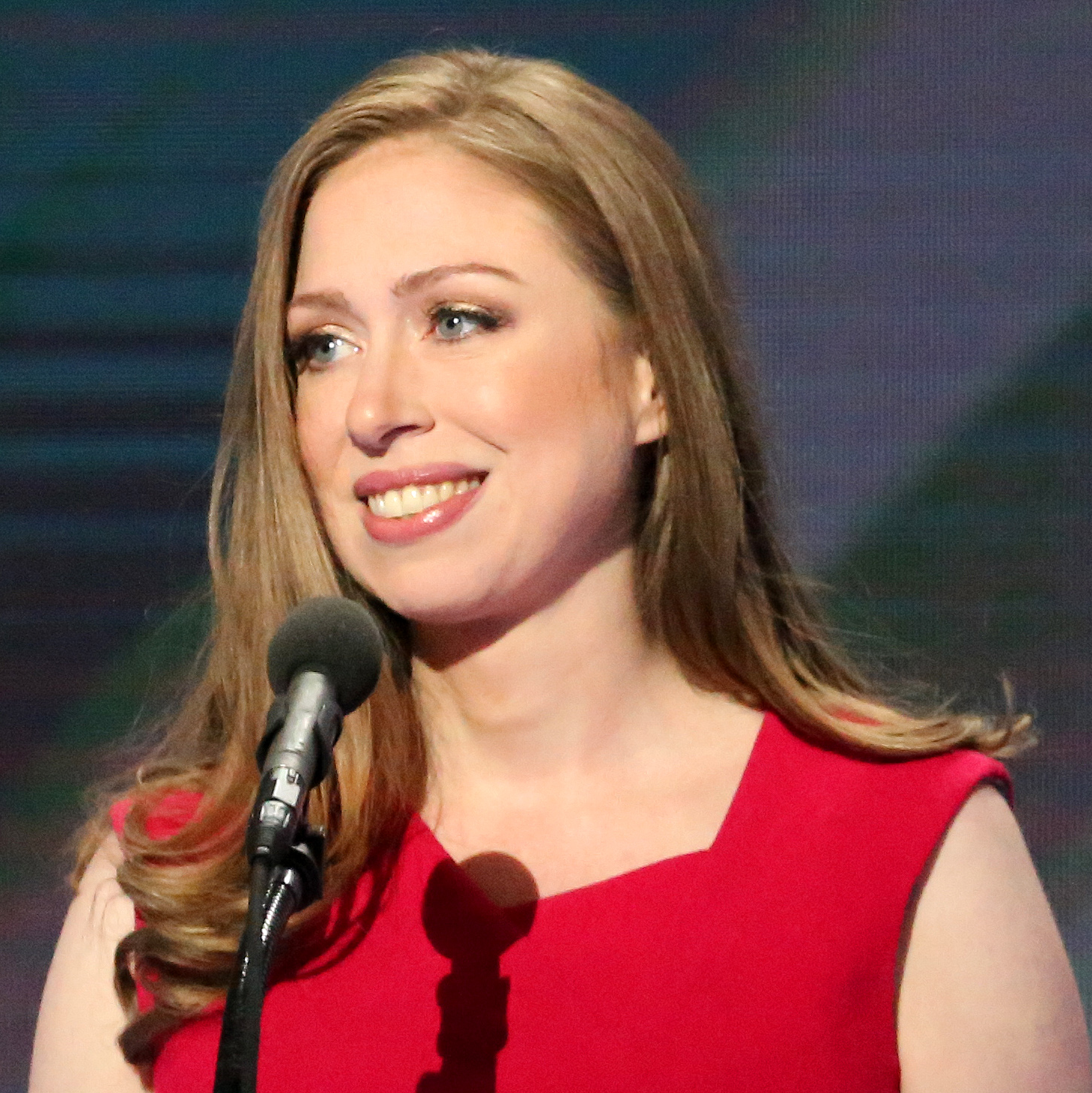
Chelsea Clinton

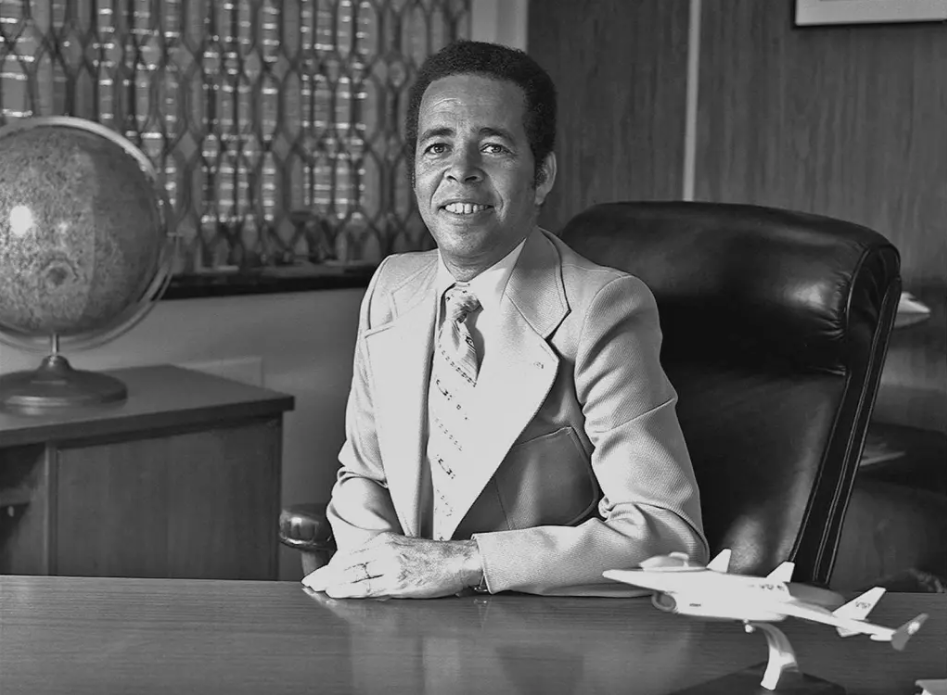
Isaac T. Gillam

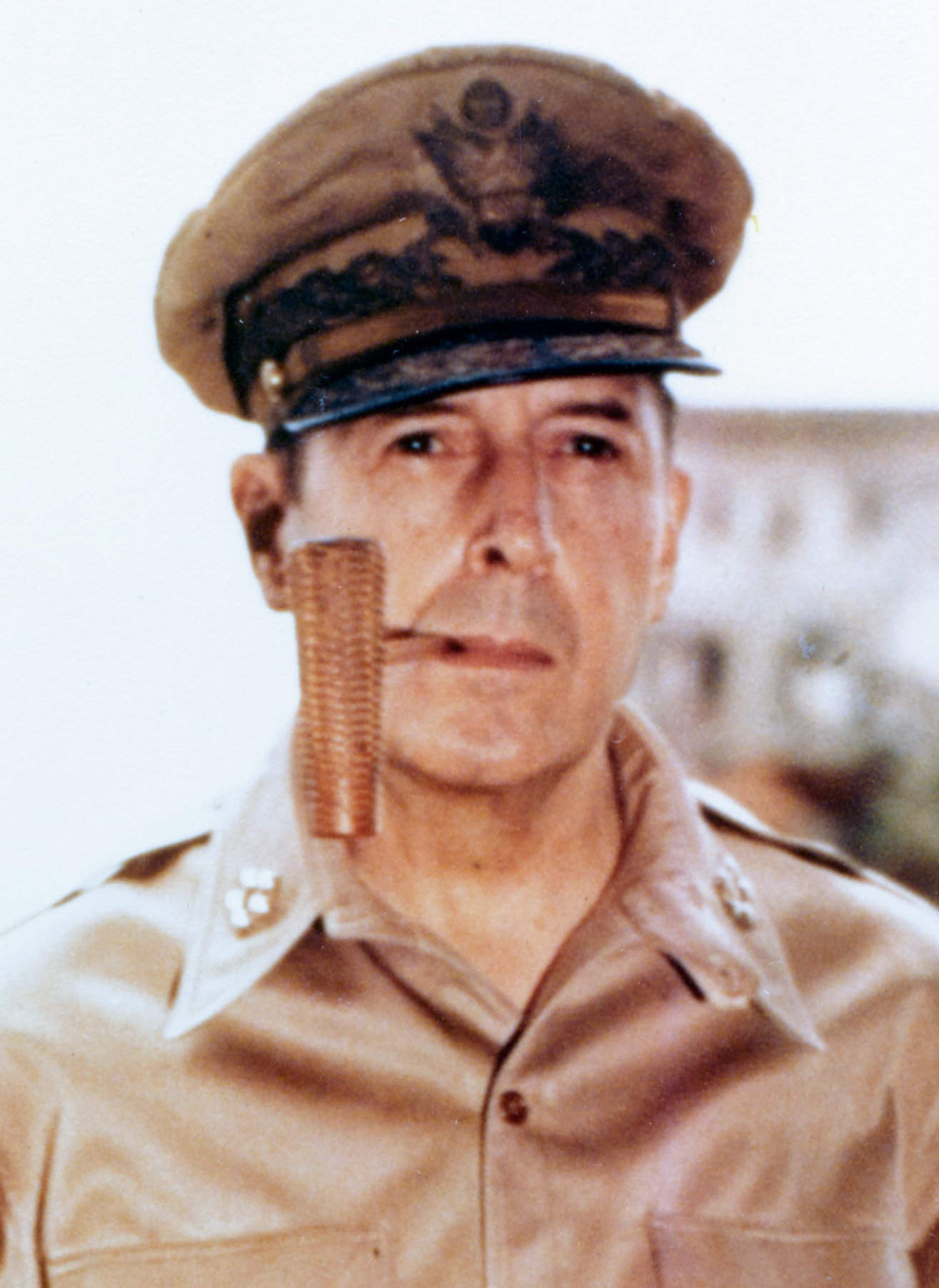
Douglas MacArthur

- Roswell Beebe (1795–1856), mayor, alderman, benefactor, president of Cairo and Fulton Railroad
- Drew Bowers (1886–1985), Little Rock lawyer, Republican gubernatorial nominee in 1926 and 1928
- Shelby Brewer (1937–2015), top nuclear official in Reagan Administration 1981–1984
- Preston Bynum (1939–2018), lobbyist and former Republican former member of Arkansas House
- Marvin Childers (born 1961), former Arkansas state representative from Mississippi County, lawyer and poultry industry lobbyist in Little Rock
- Thomas James Churchill (1824–1905), Confederate general, governor; moved to the city in 1848
- Wesley Clark (born 1944), 2004 presidential candidate; NATO commander; born in Chicago but a graduate of Hall High School in Little Rock
- Bill Clinton (born 1946), 42nd president of the United States and previously governor of Arkansas; lived in the city
- Hillary Clinton (born 1947), U.S. secretary of state, U.S. senator from New York, 2016 presidential candidate, wife of Bill Clinton, former first lady of state and U.S.; lived in the city
- Chelsea Clinton (born 1980 in Little Rock), daughter of Bill Clinton and Hillary Clinton
- Osro Cobb (1904–1996), lawyer, Republican politician from Montgomery County and later Little Rock
- Sterling R. Cockrill (1925–2022), Speaker of the Arkansas House of Representatives, 1967–1968; Republican nominee for lieutenant governor, 1970
- Tom Cotton (born 1977), U.S. senator; official voting address in Little Rock
- Les Eaves (born 1967), member of the Arkansas House of Representative for White County; former Little Rock resident
- Orval Faubus (1906–1994), six-term Arkansas governor known for his 1957 stand against integration of Little Rock schools in defiance of United States Supreme Court rulings
- Vivian Flowers (born c. 1969), member of Arkansas House of Representatives; diversity officer at UAMS Medical Center in Little Rock
- Clay Ford (1938–2013), member of Arkansas House of Representatives 1975–1976; member of Florida House of Representatives from 2007 until his death
- Isaac T. Gillam (1932–2022), first African-American director of a NASA center
- Carlos Hathcock (1942–1999), legendary Marine sniper during the Vietnam War
- Kenneth Henderson (born c. 1963), Republican member of Arkansas House of Representatives; real estate developer in Russellville, former resident of Little Rock and graduate of UALR
- French Hill (born 1956), U.S. representative
- Thomas C. Hindman (1828–1868), U.S. representative representing Arkansas and a major general for Confederacy during the American Civil War; assassinated in 1868
- Missy Irvin (born 1971), Republican member of Arkansas State Senate from Stone County since 2011; born in Little Rock
- Jim Keet (born 1949), state legislator from Little Rock, Republican gubernatorial nominee against incumbent Mike Beebe in 2010 general election
- Allen Kerr (born 1954), Republican member of the Arkansas House of Representatives from Pulaski County; insurance agent in his native Little Rock; state insurance commissioner
- Douglas MacArthur GCB (1880–1964), United States Army general and Medal of Honor recipient, Supreme Commander of the Allied forces in the South West Pacific Area
- Charles B. MacDonald (1922–1990), United States Army officer of World War II, and military historian
- Richard Mays (born 1943), Democratic member of the Arkansas House of Representatives from Pulaski County (1973–1977); associate justice of the Arkansas Supreme Court (1979–1980)
- Sheffield Nelson (born 1941), businessman and Republican politician
- Frank Pace Jr. (1912–1988), first president of the Corporation for Public Broadcasting
- Scott E. Parazynski (born 1961), astronaut
- Albert Pike (1809–1891), attorney, soldier, writer, Freemason; only Confederate military figure honored with a statue in Washington D.C.; once lived in Little Rock
- John Selden Roane (1817–1867), governor of Arkansas and Confederate general; died in Pine Bluff and is buried at Oaklawn Cemetery in Little Rock
- Tommy F. Robinson (1942–2024), former member of the U.S. House of Representatives
- David J. Sanders (born 1975), Republican state senator from District 15, Baptist education official in Little Rock
- Grant Tennille (born 1968 or 1969), chair of the Democratic Party of Arkansas
- Wallace Townsend (1882–1979), Republican national committeeman from Arkansas 1928–1961, Little Rock attorney
- William Townsend (1914–2005), Democratic member of the Arkansas House of Representatives; Little Rock optometrist
- Carmen Twillie (born 1959), lawyer and politician, dean of Douglass College
- John H. Yancey (1918–1986), highly decorated United States Marine
- Warren Stephens (1957), businessman and 68th United States Ambassador to the United Kingdom

== Others ==
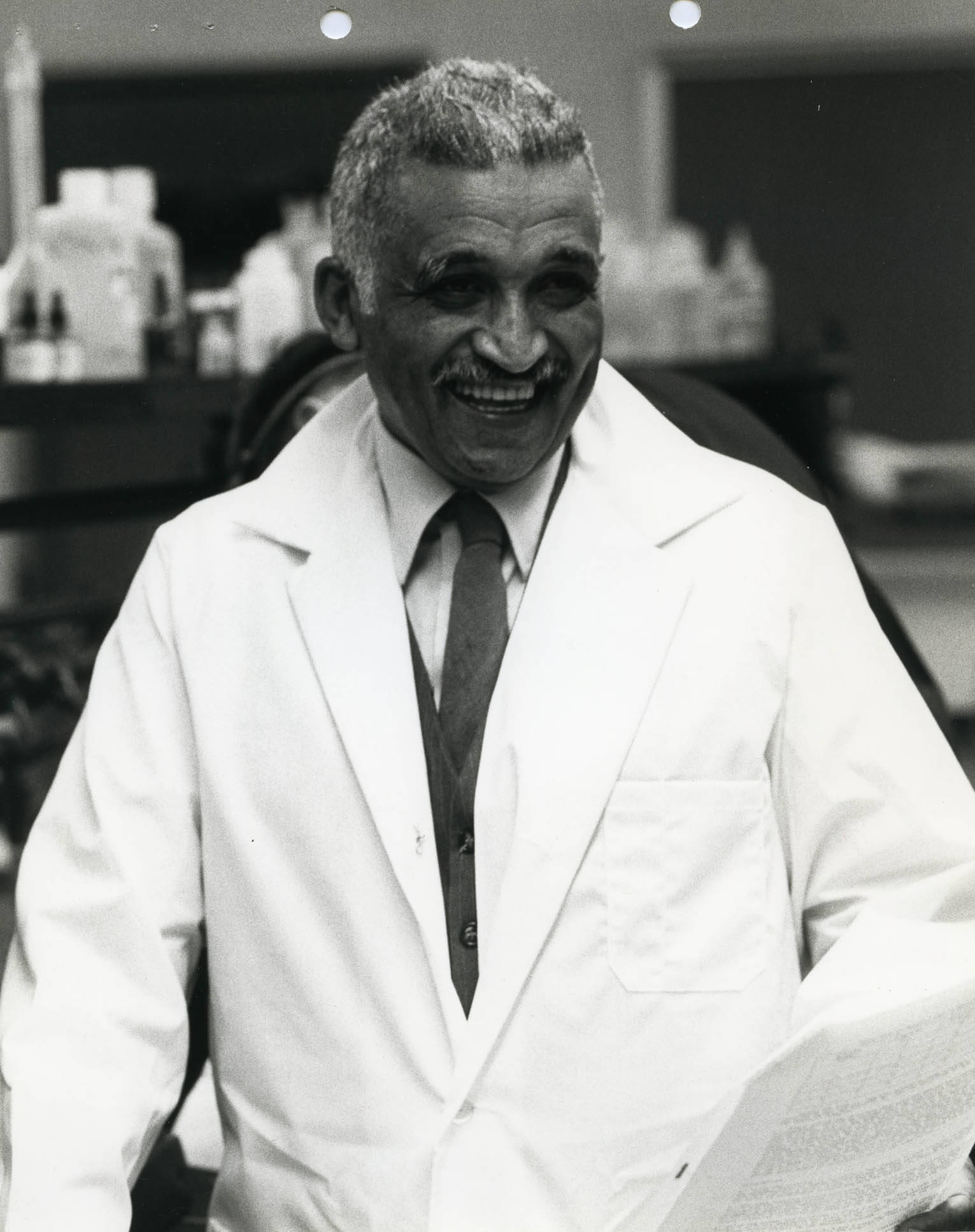
Professor Samuel P. Massie

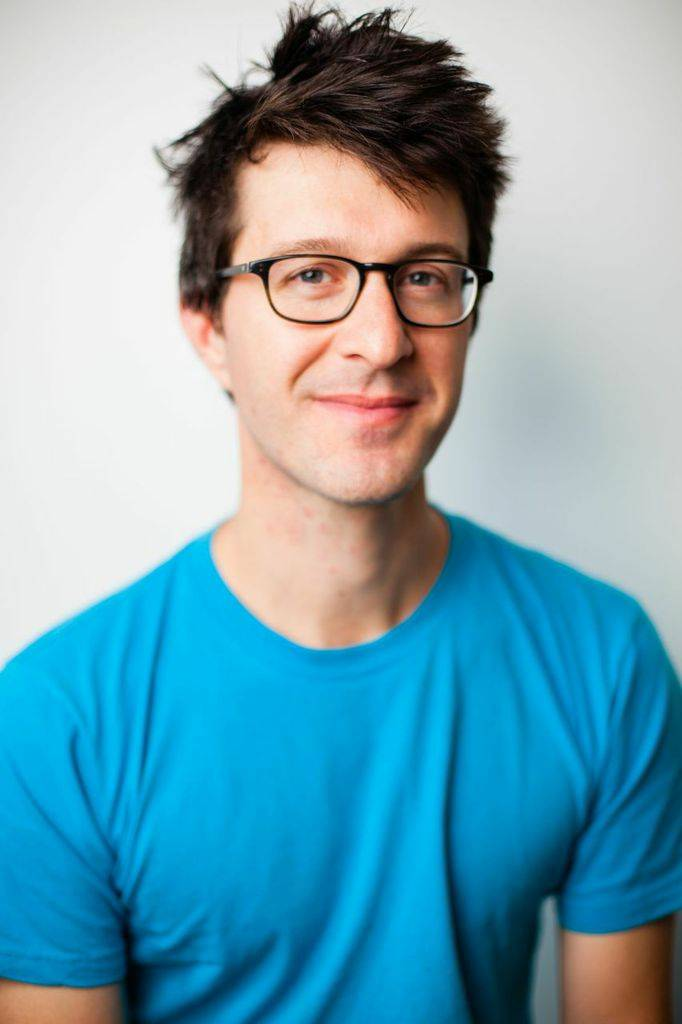
Christian Rudder

- Ben M. Bogard (1868–1951), clergyman, founder of American Baptist Association, pastor of Antioch Missionary Baptist Church, a founder of Missionary Baptist Seminary, both in Little Rock
- James E. Cofer (born 1949), former professor at the University of Arkansas at Little Rock; president of Missouri State University in Springfield 2010–2011
- Kate Embry Dowdle Davis (1871–1954), President National of the U.S. Daughters of 1812
- Connie Hamzy (1955–2021), groupie
- E. Fay Jones (1921–2004), architect, designer and apprentice of Frank Lloyd Wright
- David Levering Lewis (born 1936), historian, Julius Silver University professor and Professor of History at New York University and recipient of two Pulitzer Prizes
- Elsie M. Lewis (1912–1992), scholar, history professor, and consultant; one of the first African-American women to receive formal training in history
- Samuel P. Massie (1919–2005), chemist named one of the top 75 distinguished chemists in history by Chemical and Engineering News; first African-American professor of the U.S. Naval Academy
- Wade Rathke (born 1948), founder and chief organizer of Association of Community Organizations for Reform Now (ACORN); started the non-profit organization in Little Rock
- Alison Rogers (born 1966), New York City real estate agent and author
- Christian Rudder (born 1975), co-founder, with three others, of dating site OkCupid
- Charlotte Andrews Stephens (1854–1951), first African-American to teach in Little Rock, taught for seventy years
- Richard Thalheimer, founder and CEO of Sharper Image; raised in Little Rock
- Jeanne Fox Weinmann (1874–1962), president national of the U.S. Daughters of 1812 and president general of the United Daughters of the Confederacy
