= Franklin Delano Roosevelt Foundation =

The Franklin Delano Roosevelt Foundation is a private 501(c)3 US public charity based at Adams House, Harvard University. Founded as the FDR Suite Foundation in 2008, its original goal was to restore the Harvard rooms of Franklin Roosevelt, the 32nd President of the United States. The Foundation adopted its current name in 2014 to better reflect its broadened philanthropic mission to promote and preserve the legacy of Franklin Roosevelt throughout the world. The Foundation currently comprises three principal initiatives:

== The Franklin Delano Roosevelt Suite & Historical Collections ==
The centerpiece and spiritual home of the Foundation is the FDR Suite at Adams House, Harvard University, the 1904 Westmorly Court rooms of “Frank” Roosevelt and his roommate Lathrop “Jake” Brown. There, the Foundation maintains a living museum to the 32nd president of the United States. After a complete renovation that required six years and $300,000, the restored rooms, which contain almost 2000 period objects, shed new light on the early life of one of America's most important president and form one of the most detailed and illustrative collections of Gilded Age university life anywhere in the world.

== The FDR Global Citizenship Program ==
The Global Citizenship program exposes Harvard undergraduates to the globalized structures that underpin 21st-century business, politics, communications and science; with strong emphases on health, ideology and the environment. Student programming includes conferences and seminars throughout the academic year that allow undergraduates to engage directly with noted experts from government, science, development, medicine and diplomacy. The program also sponsors the FDR Global Fellowship, which annually sends 2-4 talented undergraduates – who could not otherwise afford to spend a summer in academic pursuits – abroad for extensive training and research in the humanities and natural sciences.

== The FDR Center for Global Engagement ==
Begun in 2013 as an expansion of the Foundation's educational mission, the Center is guided by one of the core tenets of Franklin Roosevelt's philosophy: "it is common sense to take a method and try it. If it fails, admit it frankly and try another. But above all, try something."

A non-partisan think-tank, the Center is committed to finding practical, reasonable, implementable solutions to specific problems confounding the 21st century. The Center supports research for broad publication, conducts consultative projects for real-world clients, and hosts fellows from beyond the gates of Harvard. The Center's director is Jed Willard '96.

The Foundation's current executive director is Michael Weishan

== Primary sources ==
- Roosevelt, Franklin D.; Roosevelt, Elliot, ed. FDR: His Personal Letters (4 vol., 1947); volume one covers Roosevelt's years at Groton and Harvard; pg 371 gives a physical description of the Suite, and includes Roosevelt's own drawing of the floor plan; subsequent letters describe the rooms' decor and furnishing.

== Architectural references ==
- Bainbridge Bunting, Margaret Henderson Floyd, Harvard: An Architectural History, Harvard University Press, 1985.
- Shand-Tucci, Douglass, Harvard University: An Architectural Tour, Princeton Architectural Press, 2001

== Biographies of FDR with details of the FDR Suite ==
- Freidel, Frank. Franklin D. Roosevelt: A Rendezvous with Destiny (1990), One-volume scholarly biography; covers entire life
- Freidel, Frank. Franklin D. Roosevelt (4 vol 1952–73), the most detailed scholarly biography; ends in 1934.
- Smith, Jean Edward FDR 2007 ISBN 978-1-4000-6121-1
- Ward, Geoffrey C. Before The Trumpet: Young Franklin Roosevelt, 1882–1905 details of FDR's Harvard Years
- Weishan, Michael FDR: A Life in Pictures
