= Michael Weishan =

American author, designer, and historian

Michael Weishan (born 7 August in Milwaukee, Wisconsin) is an American author, designer, popular historian and former television personality.

== Biography ==
Weishan was host of the public television series The Victory Garden from 2002 through 2007. He was the fourth host of the series, and retired after five seasons to resume active direction of his landscape design firm, Michael Weishan and Associates, which specializes in creating traditionally inspired landscapes for homes across the US and Canada.

In addition to his work on PBS, Weishan has appeared on numerous national TV programs in the United States, including the Today Show on NBC, as well as the CBS Early Show. On radio, he hosted his own weekly NPR program, The Cultivated Gardener from 1999 to 2001, and still appears as a guest contributor on NPR's venerable environmental news program Living on Earth, where he first appeared in the early 1990s. Weishan is also the author of three books on horticulture: The New Traditional Garden (1999); From a Victorian Garden (2004); and The Victory Garden Companion (2006).

The gardening editor at Country Living for five years, Weishan was a frequent contributor to various national periodicals, including New Old House Magazine where he wrote a quarterly gardening column. Weishan's research in landscape design overlaps with a lifelong love of architecture, architectural design and archaeology, and his first published work (1991) was as editor and co-contributor (along with noted Harvard archaeologist George M.A. Hanfmann) of The Byzantine Shops at Sardis, volume 9 of the Sardis Archaeological Series published by the Harvard University Press.

An honors graduate of Harvard College in Classics and Romance Languages, Weishan is active in many charities and non-profit institutions, especially those relating to history and FGLI (first generation/lower income) college programming at Harvard as well as institutions across the country. Among these, he is a member of the Adams House Senior Common Room at Harvard, where he is founding executive director of the Franklin Delano Roosevelt Foundation, an organization that has completed the restoration of Franklin Delano Roosevelt's student rooms – the FDR Suite at Adams House, Harvard University. The Foundation has restored the Suite to its original 1903 appearance as a memorial to the 32nd president of the United States, which is the only one at Harvard.

In his role as executive director of the Foundation, Weishan co-authored (with Dr. Cynthia Koch, past director of the Franklin D. Roosevelt Presidential Library and Museum) a biography of Franklin Delano Roosevelt entitled FDR: A Life in Pictures in 2013.

As president and CEO of the Southborough Historical Society in Southborough, Massachusetts, he has published two books, Lost Southborough and Tales of Old Southboro'. Weishan also led the construction of the now completed History and Arts Center at Fayville Village Hall, finished in 2025 after a five-year, 2.5-million-dollar restoration.

In addition to his non-fiction work, Weishan has published two novels: Descent (2010, revised 2026) and The Normandie Affair (2026). His next work, the non-fiction Convergence: How the Sinking of the Titanic Created Modern-Day Harvard is due out in early 2027.

== Major publications ==
- Weishan, Michael. (1999)The New Traditional Garden: A Practical Guide to Creating and Restoring Authentic American Gardens for Homes of All Ages. ISBN 0-345-42041-1
- Weishan, Michael. (2004) From a Victorian Garden: Creating the Romance of a Bygone Age Right in Your Own Backyard. ISBN 0-670-89426-5
- Weishan, Michael. (2006) The Victory Garden Companion. ISBN 0-06-059977-4
- Weishan, Michael. (2013) FDR: A Life in Pictures. ISBN 1-482-06889-3
- Weishan, Michael. (2019) Lost Southborough. ISBN 978-1979727518
- Weishan, Michael. (2021) Tales of Old Southboro'. ISBN 9798596952766
- Weishan, Michael. (2026) Descent. ISBN 9798185170069
- Weishan, Michael. (2026) The Normandie Affair. ISBN 9798185073568
- Archaeological Exploration of Sardis, Volume 9 (1991). The Byzantine Shops at Sardis. ISBN 0-674-08968-5 (Contributor/editor)
