= Dunbar High School (Little Rock, Arkansas) =

African-American high school in Little Rock, Arkansas

Paul Laurence Dunbar High School

Location
- Little Rock, Arkansas; United States
- Coordinates: 34.7323°N 92.2863°W

Information
- Former name: Negro School for Industrial Arts
- Type: Public
- Established: 1929
- Closed: 1955

Paul Laurence Dunbar High School and Junior College was a school for black students in Little Rock, Arkansas before integration.

== History ==
In 1929, the Rosenwald Fund provided the seed money to build a school for African-American children in Little Rock at the corner of Wright Avenue and Ringo Street, one of 338 Rosenwald Schools built in Arkansas. Prior to its opening, there were 5 elementary schools and one high school (M. W. Gibbs at 18th and Ringo, named after local judge Mifflin Wistar Gibbs), but part of Gibbs had been destroyed in a fire and of insufficient size for the community.

The school opened under the name Negro School for Industrial Arts, but the local population wanted it to be a college preparatory school rather than a school that only prepared students for the labor force. With this in mind, the school was renamed Paul Laurence Dunbar High School after black author Paul Dunbar. The building project cost $400,000, of which $67,000 came from the Rosenwald Foundation, $30,000 from the school board, and the rest from local citizens. In contrast, the supposedly "separate but equal" Little Rock Central High School was built in 1927 with $1.5 million in funds provided entirely by the school board. Dunbar was provided with textbooks after they were discarded from Central. Dunbar had 1/3 the number of classrooms and floor space, smaller faculty salaries, and no sports facilities.

Dunbar closed as a high school and junior college in 1955 when the schools were integrated, and was demoted to junior high status. In 1980 the building was added to the National Register of Historic Places.

== Notable people ==
- Milton Crenchaw, pilot and flight instructor for the Tuskegee Airmen
- L. Clifford Davis, civil rights attorney, judge
- Sammy Drake, former Major League Baseball Player
- Solly Drake, former Major League Baseball player
- Isaac T. Gillam, director of NASA Dryden Flight Research Center and first Black director of a NASA center
- Gertrude Jeannette, American playwright, film and stage actress. First woman to work as a licensed taxi driver in New York City in 1942
- Willie Smith, former player in the National Football League
- Robert Williams, psychologist who coined the term "Ebonics"
