= Tommy F. Robinson =

American politician (1942–2024)

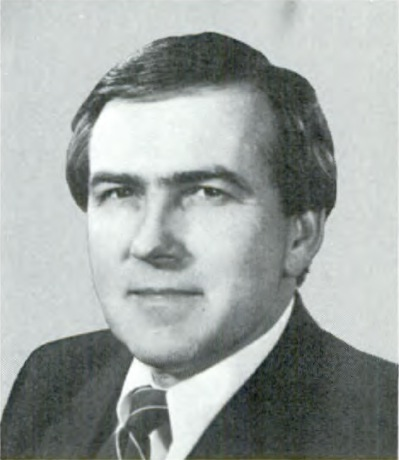
- Official portrait, 1990

Member of the U.S. House of Representatives from Arkansas's 2nd district
- In office January 3, 1985 – January 3, 1991
- Preceded by: Ed Bethune
- Succeeded by: Ray Thornton

Sheriff of Pulaski County, Arkansas
- In office 1981–1984
- Preceded by: Ken Best
- Succeeded by: Carroll Gravett

Personal details
- Born: Tommy Franklin Robinson; March 7, 1942 Little Rock, Arkansas, U.S.
- Died: July 10, 2024 (aged 82) Forrest City, Arkansas, U.S.
- Party: Democratic (before 1989); Republican
- Spouse: Carolyn Robinson
- Children: 6
- Education: University of Arkansas at Little Rock (BA)
- Occupation: Politician; lobbyist; businessman; police officer

Military service
- Allegiance: United States
- Branch/service: Navy
- Years of service: 1959–1963

Tommy Franklin Robinson (March 7, 1942 – July 10, 2024) was an American businessman, lobbyist, and politician who served as the U.S. representative for Arkansas's 2nd congressional district from 1985 to 1991. He was a member of the Republican Party. Before he was elected to Congress, Robinson was the sheriff of Pulaski County.

== Early life and education ==
Tommy Franklin Robinson was born in Little Rock, Arkansas and graduated from the University of Arkansas at Little Rock. He served in the United States Navy from 1959 to 1963.

== Law enforcement career ==
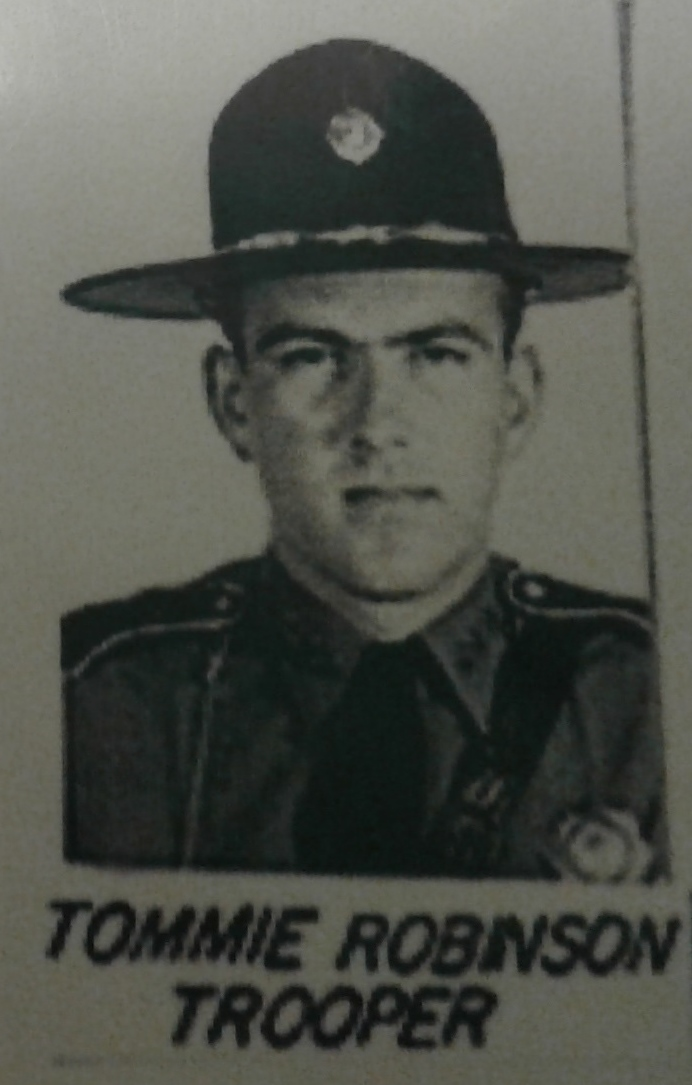
Robinson in police uniform

Robinson had a career in law enforcement, in which he reached the position of sheriff of Pulaski County. He previously served as a North Little Rock city patrolman, Arkansas state trooper, director of campus police at the University of Arkansas, and the police chief in Jacksonville, Arkansas. In 1979, he was appointed by Governor Bill Clinton as director of the short-lived Department of Public Safety, which was abolished in 1981 by Clinton's successor, Republican Frank D. White. Robinson was elected sheriff of Pulaski County in 1980, having defeated the incumbent Ken Best in the Democratic primary. He was re-elected in 1982.

Robinson's tenure was one of non-stop controversies. In early 1981, in order to relieve jail overcrowding he ordered a group of state prisoners being held at the Pulaski County Jail to be taken to the state prison at Pine Bluff. Robinson left the prisoners chained to the front gate of the prison when the warden refused to accept them.

The 1982 murder of Little Rock socialite Alice McArthur resulted in Robinson conducting a sensational investigation of her husband, attorney William McArthur. Robinson spent time in jail in 1982 on a federal contempt of court citation for having refused to allow the federally appointed jail master, Kenneth Basinger, to enter the jail. In response, the federal judge overseeing the case, George Howard Jr., an African-American, was described publicly by Robinson as "a token judge".

When his request for more money for his office was denied, he arrested County Judge Bill Beaumont and Comptroller Jo Growcock on charges of obstructing governmental operations. He released Beaumont and Growcock only when threatened with another contempt of court citation. As a result of the constant conflict, Beaumont declined to seek another term in office in 1982.

A well-publicized raid on a "toga party" led by Central Arkansas Socials led to multiple lawsuits and the labeling of Robinson and his deputies as the "Keyhole Kops." Governor Frank White referred to Robinson as "Captain Hotdog." Robinson's profanity-laced tirades at press conferences were common. In response to the high armed robbery rate in the county, Robinson initiated a program of placing hidden deputies in random convenience stores armed with shotguns; the result was a 96 percent drop in armed robberies during his tenure.

== U.S. House of Representatives ==
Robinson was elected to the United States House of Representatives in 1984 as a Democrat. He led a five-man field in the Democratic primary that included Secretary of State Paul Riviere, State Senator Stanley Russ of Conway, investment banker and former Senate aide Thedford Collins, and conservative former U.S. Representative Dale Alford. He bested Riviere in the runoff, and defeated Judy Petty, a member of the Arkansas House of Representatives and a former aide to the late Arkansas Governor Winthrop Rockefeller, and independent Jim Taylor, a liberal Democrat horrified by the more conservative Robinson. Petty ran as a Ronald Reagan Republican but lost to Robinson even though Reagan won her district. In the three-way race, Robinson polled 103,165 votes (47%) to Petty's 90,841 votes (41%), while the under-financed Taylor received 25,073 votes (11%). Robinson financed his race on almost $900,000 in unsecured bank loans, making his the most expensive congressional race in state history up to that time.

Robinson voted for the Abandoned Shipwrecks Act of 1987. The Act asserts United States title to certain abandoned shipwrecks located on or embedded in submerged lands under state jurisdiction, and transfers title to the respective state, thereby empowering states to manage these cultural and historical resources more efficiently, with the goal of preventing treasure hunters and salvagers from damaging them. President Ronald Reagan signed it into law on April 28, 1988.

While in Congress, Robinson was often at odds with the Democratic leadership of Tip O'Neill and Jim Wright, and identified closely with the Boll Weevil faction. On July 28, 1989, Robinson left the Democratic Party and joined the GOP, claiming that the Democratic Party had become too liberal. He ran for governor of Arkansas in 1990 but lost in the primary election to businessman Sheffield Nelson, also a former Democrat. Nelson was in turn defeated by Bill Clinton. Robinson's House seat was assumed in 1991 by the Democrat Ray Thornton, a former congressman and a former Arkansas Attorney General.

In 1992, during the House banking scandal, Robinson, then an ex-representative, was found to have bounced 996 checks from the U.S. House bank, some of which were more than 16 months overdue. Robinson ran again for the U.S. House in 2002 after a twelve-year absence in a district in the northeastern part of the state, but lost to the Democratic incumbent, Marion Berry. In his later years, he farmed milo in Monroe County, owned a political consulting firm, and owned a liquor store. His farm, Ag-Pro Farms, was forced into bankruptcy in 2011. Governor Mike Huckabee later appointed Robinson to the Pollution Control and Ecology Commission, and he served a term as Chair of the Pardons and Parole Board.

== Death ==
Robinson died at a hospital in Forrest City, Arkansas, on July 10, 2024, at the age of 82.

== See also ==
- List of American politicians who switched parties in office
- List of people from Little Rock, Arkansas
- List of United States representatives who switched parties

U.S. House of Representatives
Preceded by Ed Bethune	Member of the U.S. House of Representatives from Arkansas's 2nd congressional district January 3, 1985 – January 3, 1991	Succeeded by Ray Thornton
