= Adams House (Harvard College) =

Residential House of Harvard College

- Residential House
- Harvard University
- Shield
- Location: 26 Plympton Street
- Coordinates: 42°22′18″N 71°06′59″W
- Established: 1931
- Named for: John Quincy Adams and the Adams family
- Sister college: Saybrook College; Christ's College, Cambridge
- Freshman dorm: Weld Hall
- Faculty Deans: Salmaan Keshavjee and Mercedes Becerra
- Dean: Charles Lockwood
- Tutors: 27
- Website: adamshouse.harvard.edu

Adams House is one of twelve undergraduate residential Houses at Harvard University, located between Harvard Square and the Charles River in Cambridge, Massachusetts. Its name commemorates the services of the Adams family, including John Adams, the second president of the United States, and John Quincy Adams, the sixth president.

== History ==
The residential halls of Adams House (Claverly, Randolph, Westmorly and Old Russell) were originally private "Gold Coast" dormitories built from 1893 to 1902 to provide luxurious accommodation for rich Harvard undergraduates. They, along with the white clapboard Apthorp House (1760), one of the most distinguished Colonial residences of Cambridge—and now the Faculty Dean's residence—predate the rest of Harvard's Houses by several decades. When the House system was inaugurated in the 1930s, Old Russell was demolished and replaced with New Russell (which houses the C-Entryway suites). A linking structure was also added that contains the upper and lower common rooms, library, conservatory, kitchen, and dining areas; the addition also includes the famous "Gold Room" — Adams' domed, tiled and gilded Mudéjar-inspired entrance hall. Although officially inaugurated in 1931, Adams House was not completed until New Russell's construction in 1932. Because of its centuries-long architectural history, Adams is considered Harvard's most historic undergraduate residence.

Surprisingly, given the House's current appeal, Adams was not popular initially; the Victorian era rooms of the Gold Coast buildings seemed dark and "Germanic" to 1930's taste, and many students preferred the entirely up-to-date neo-Colonial structures of Eliot, Winthrop and Dunster Houses. Adams' location, however, (it is the closest of all the Houses to Harvard Yard) and its reputation for good food (it is one of the few Harvard Houses that doesn't share a kitchen) soon overcame any perceived architectural deficiencies. In fact, some of these same "deficiencies" turned out to be quite handy: students in the 1940s and 1950s wishing to avoid the College's strict nightly curfews and parietal rules came to greatly value Adams' multiple and unguarded entries, unlike the central, monitored portals of the newer undergraduate residences. Today, such stringent measures are long gone, and the various buildings that comprise Adams House are considered some of the most interesting and architecturally significant structures in the university system.

Adams is also home to one of two Presidential Suite Memorials at Harvard. Franklin D. Roosevelt lived in Westmorly Court (now B-17) from 1900 to 1904. The Franklin Delano Roosevelt Foundation at Adams House has completely restored the 32nd president's Harvard quarters to their 1904 appearance, as the only memorial to FDR at Harvard, as well as a museum of early-20th-century Harvard student life. The Suite is open by appointment to University members, members of the press, and other accredited guests.

== Emblem and motto ==
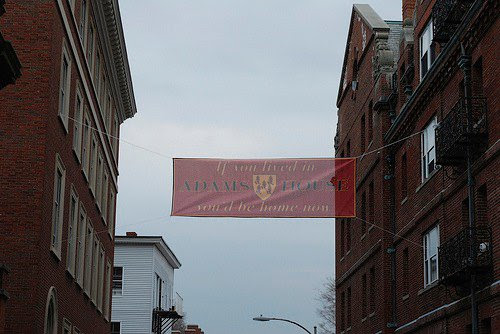
A sign above the main entrance to Adams House at 26 Plympton St, commemorating the annual college Housing Day for freshman. It reads, "If you lived in Adams House you'd be home now" and contains the house shield.

Like all the other Houses at Harvard, Adams possesses its own coat of arms: Adams' is derived from an 1838 seal ring of John Quincy Adams. James Phinney Baxter III, the House's first master, changed the background to gold to symbolize the Gold Coast, and added four additional oak sprigs to the original one to represent the five buildings of Adams House. Its official heraldic designation is: "Or, five sprigs of oak acorned in saltire, Gules." The House motto, "Alteri Seculo", is taken from Caecilius Statius, as quoted in Cicero's Tusculan Disputations: "He who plants trees labors for the benefit of future generations." ("Serit arbores quae alteri s[a]eculo prosint.") (The alternate, late-Latin spelling, 'seculo' in lieu of the more normal 'saeculo' was noted at the House's founding in 1931. A letter to Master Baxter, now in the Adams House Archives, indicates that Adams himself had thus spelled the word in his signet, and therefore this spelling would be maintained for posterity in the House's official motto.)

== Reputation and traditions ==
Before Harvard College opted to use a system of randomization to assign living quarters to upperclassmen, students were allowed to list housing preferences, which led to the congregation of like-minded individuals at various Houses. At first, in the 1930s, 1940s and 1950s, Adams was the athletic house; then, during the late 1960s, that reputation changed, and Adams became a center for student activism. Later, under the aegis of Masters Bob and Jana Kiely (1972–1999) Adams became an artistic and literary haven; during this period, Adams also became widely regarded as the most gay-friendly house, in an era before equal rights for people of different sexual orientations were even considered a viable alternative at Harvard. Adams, under the Kielys, was also the first Harvard House to become fully co-ed. After the Kielys, Adams continued to be an important space for social justice organizing and mobilizing under the guidance of Judy and Sean Palfrey. Adams' avant-garde reputation still remains today, protected and promoted by the House's current Faculty Deans, Mercedes Becerra and Salmaan Keshavjee, and embodied in many of the House's unique facilities, including the Pool Theater, a converted swimming pool (a change lamented by alumni mourning the many late night trysts, water polo matches and other quasi illicit activities that were reputed to have occurred there, like coed nude swimming); the recently restored Coolidge Room (the site of artist Edward Penfield's famous murals) and the Gold Room, Adams' gilded vestibule to the world. Adams also boasts the Bow and Arrow Printing Press which is located in the former house grille in B entry, and the Adams Arts Space (previously the House's squash courts).

The House has continued to uphold its most beloved traditions, including Drag Night; a Winter Feast, which features a black-tie reading of Winnie-the-Pooh; house formals; and Masters' Teas that are well known throughout the university. House events, including Carpe Noctem, are coordinated weekly by the Adams House Committee.

== Alumni magazine ==
Alone among the Harvard Houses, Adams has its own alumni magazine, called the Gold Coaster. Published in e-zine format semi-annually, the Gold Coaster features stories on Adams House history, famous residents, alumni profiles, student submissions, and news of upcoming alumni events.

== Notable residents ==
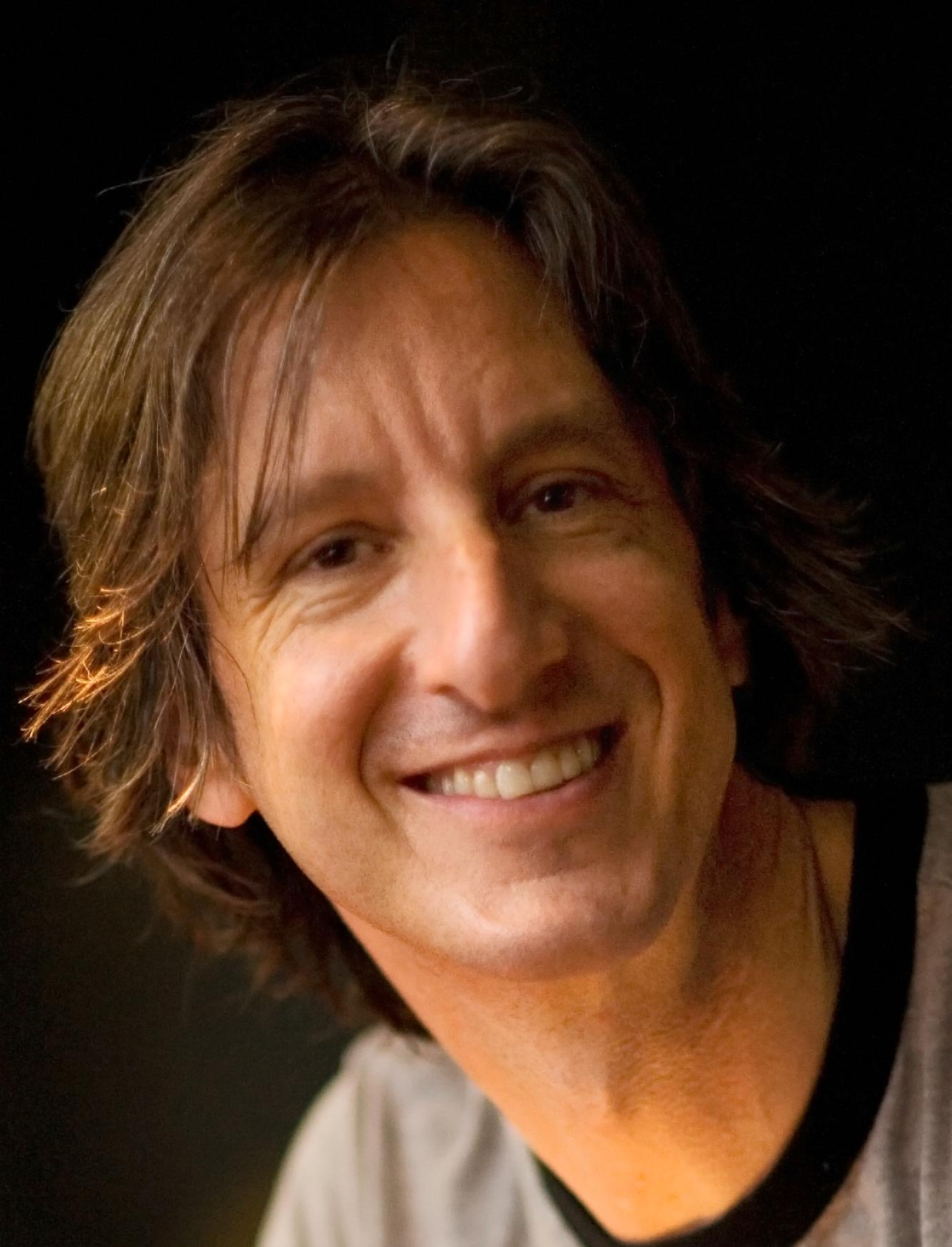
Andy Borowitz

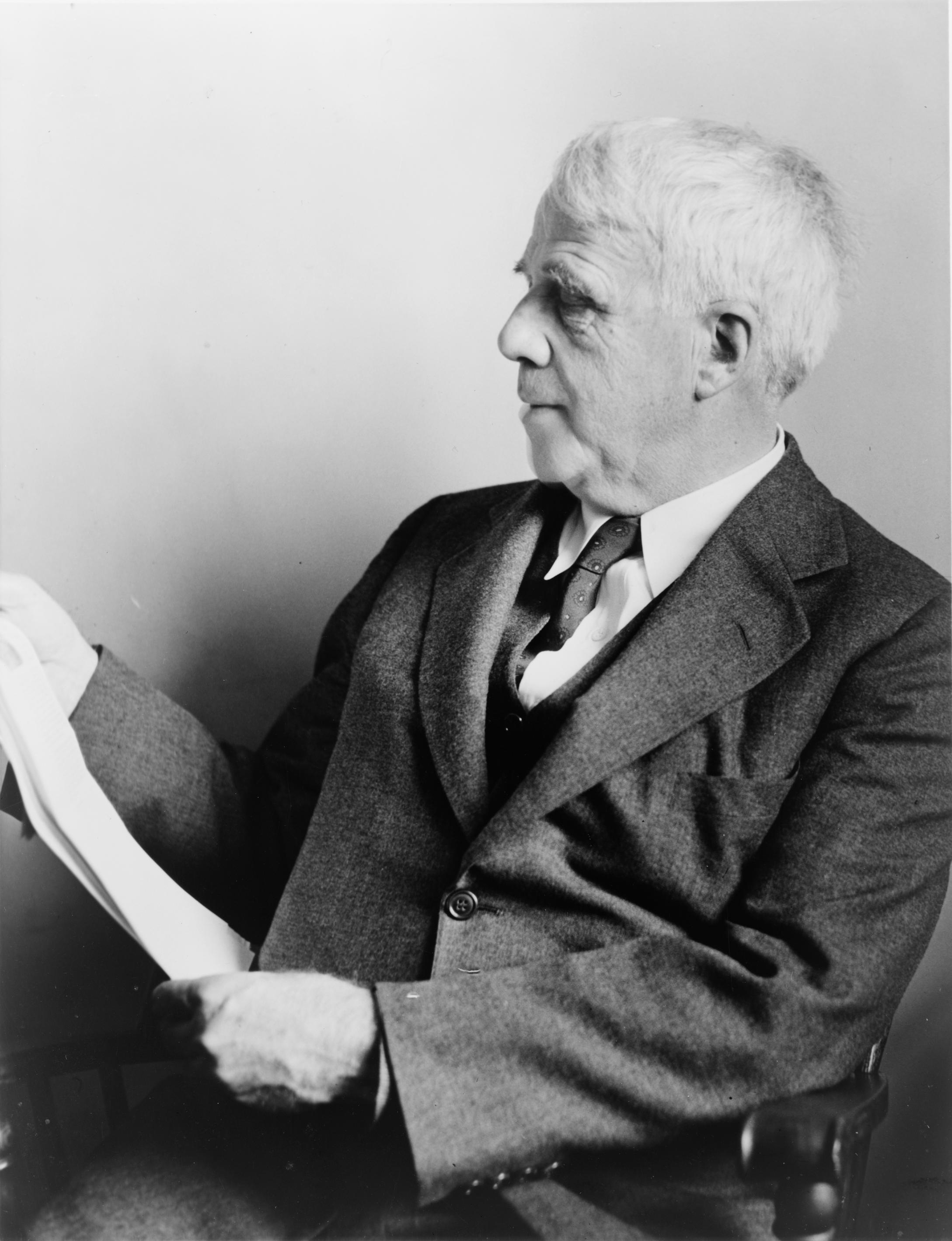
Robert Frost

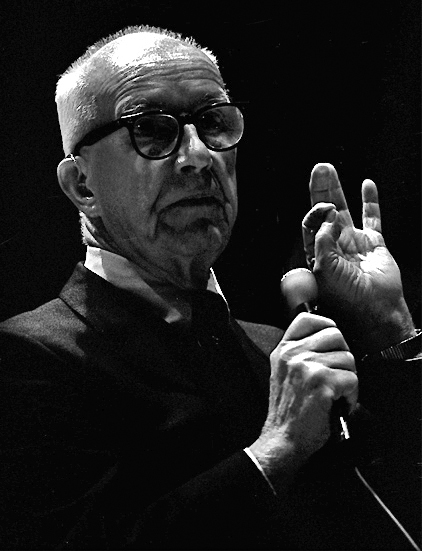
Buckminster Fuller

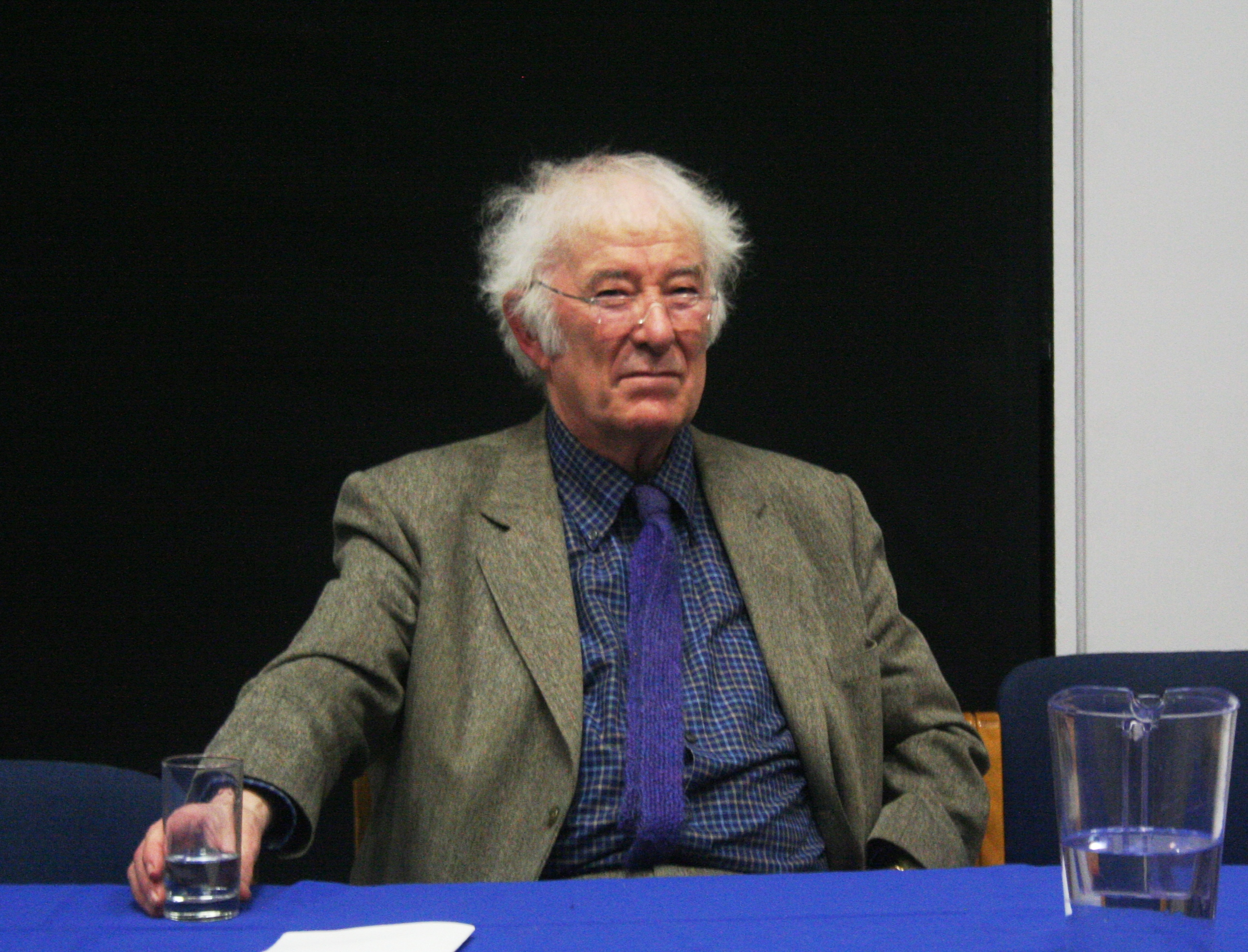
Seamus Heaney

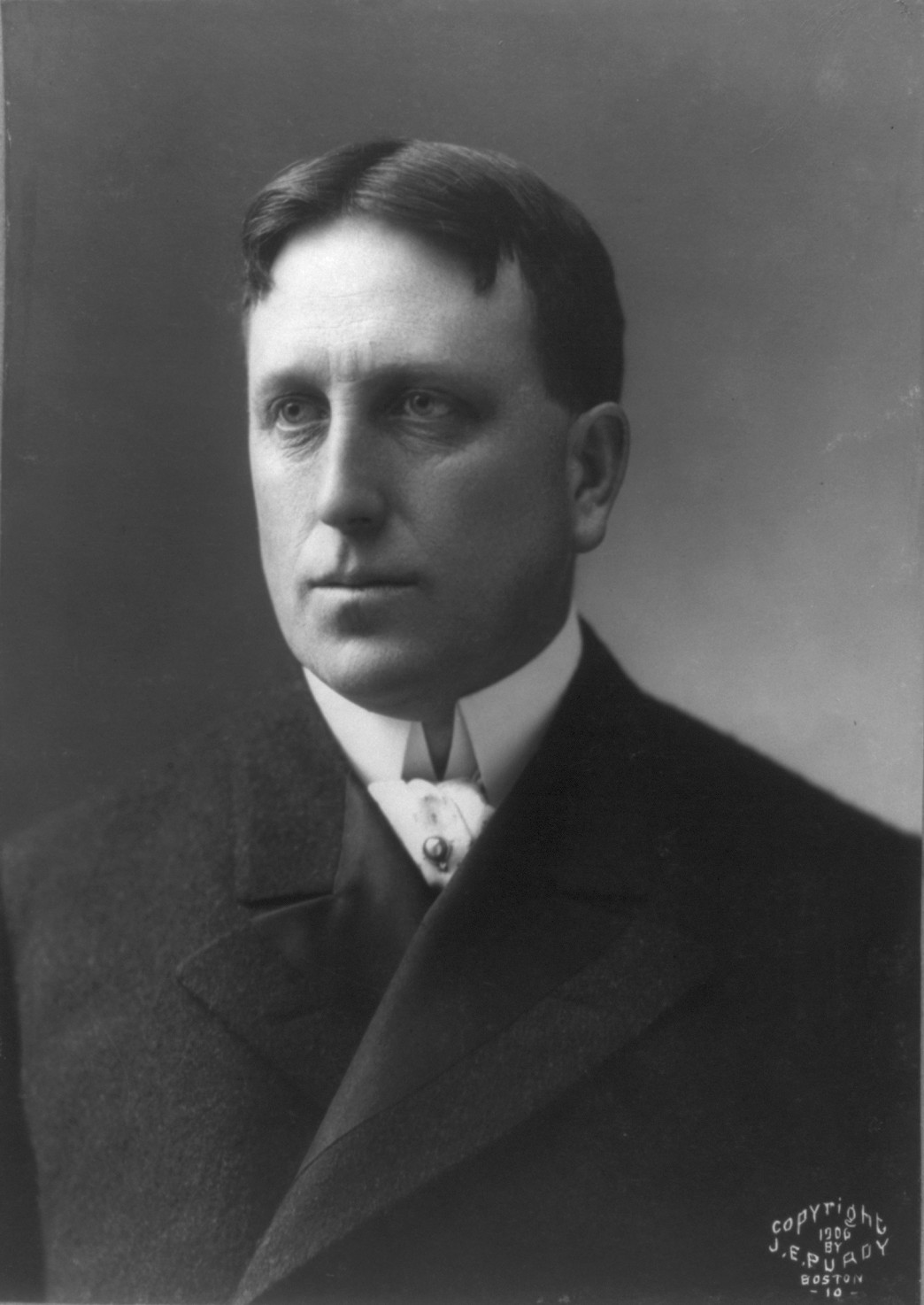
William Randolph Hearst

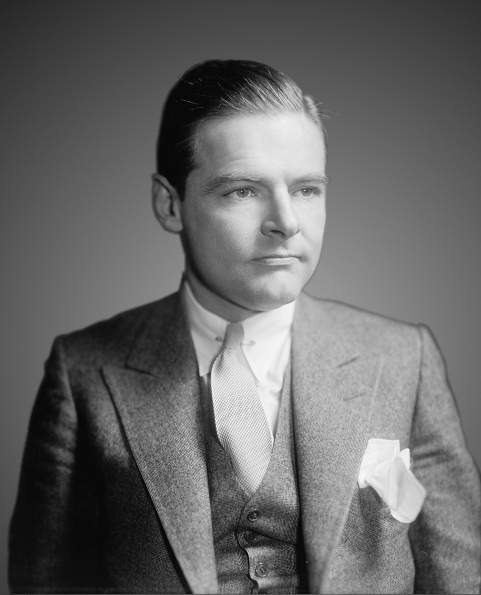
Henry Cabot Lodge Jr.

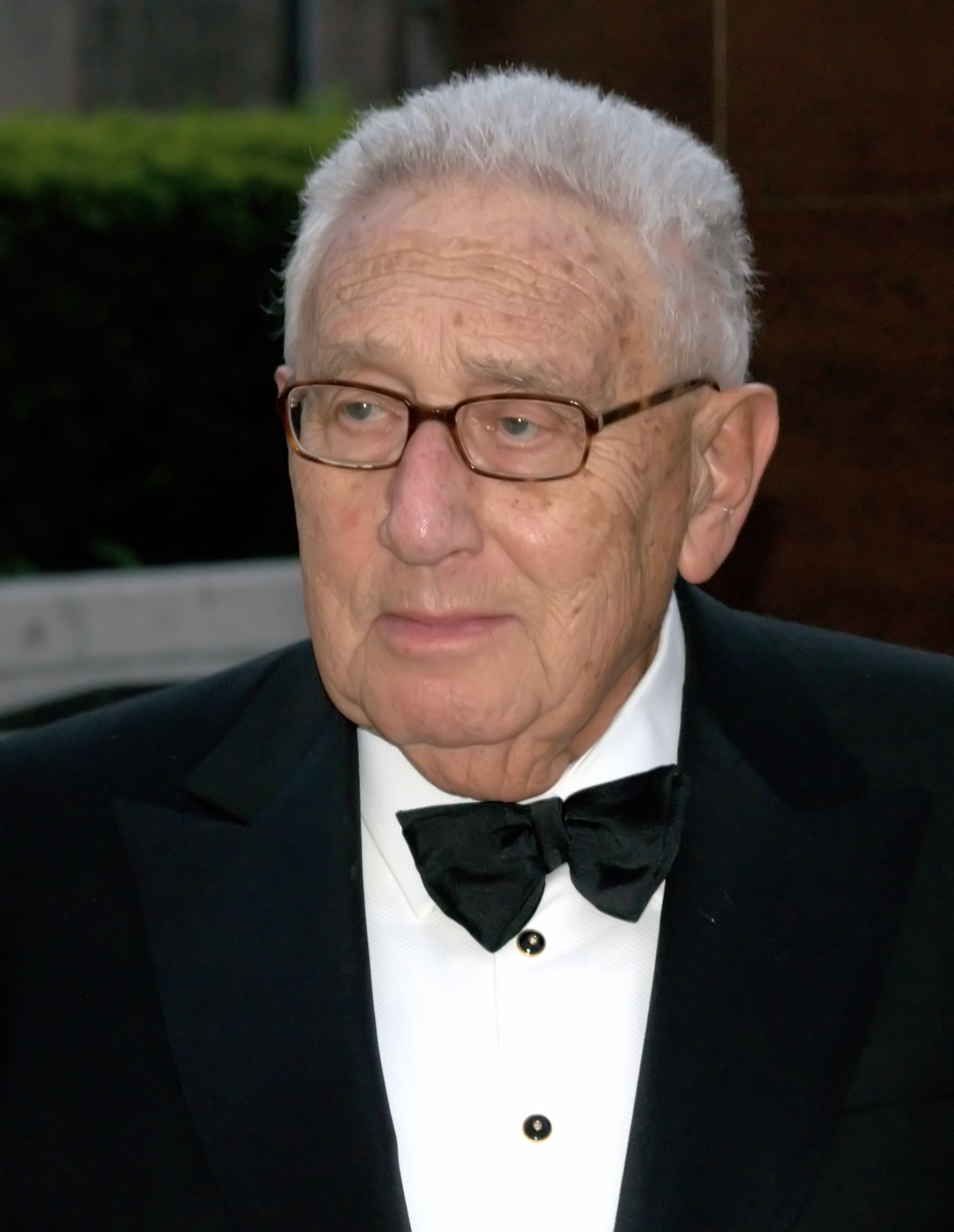
Henry Kissinger

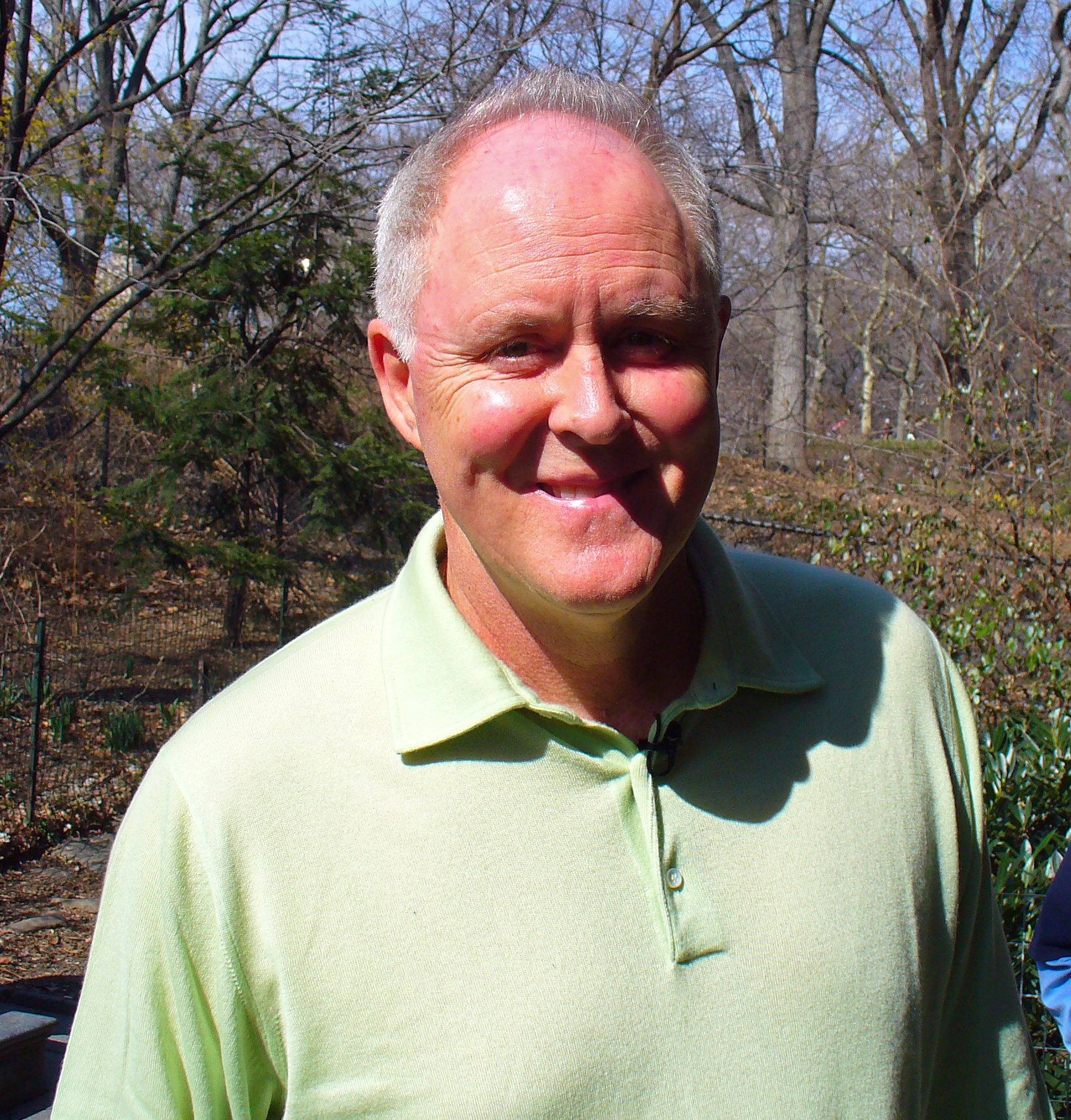
John Lithgow

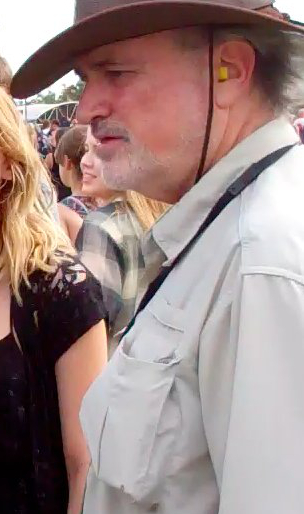
Terrence Malick

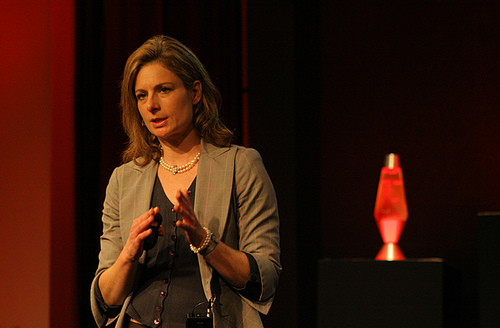
Lisa Randall

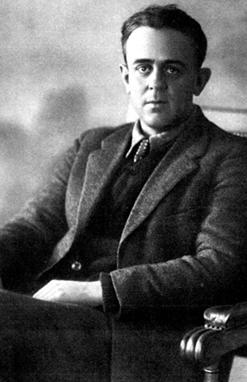
John Reed

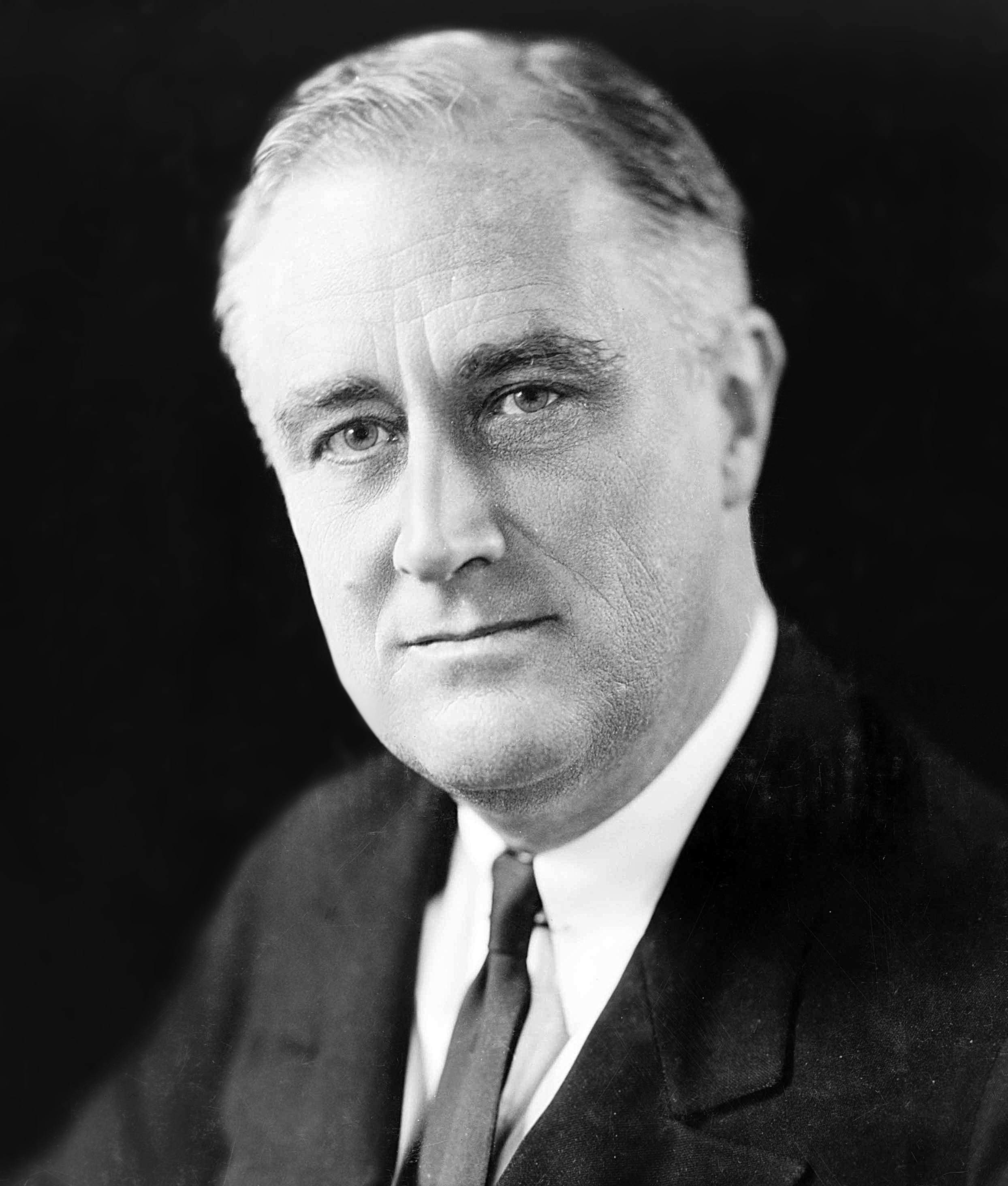
Franklin D. Roosevelt

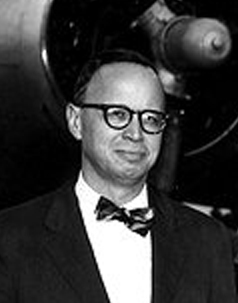
Arthur Schlesinger Jr.

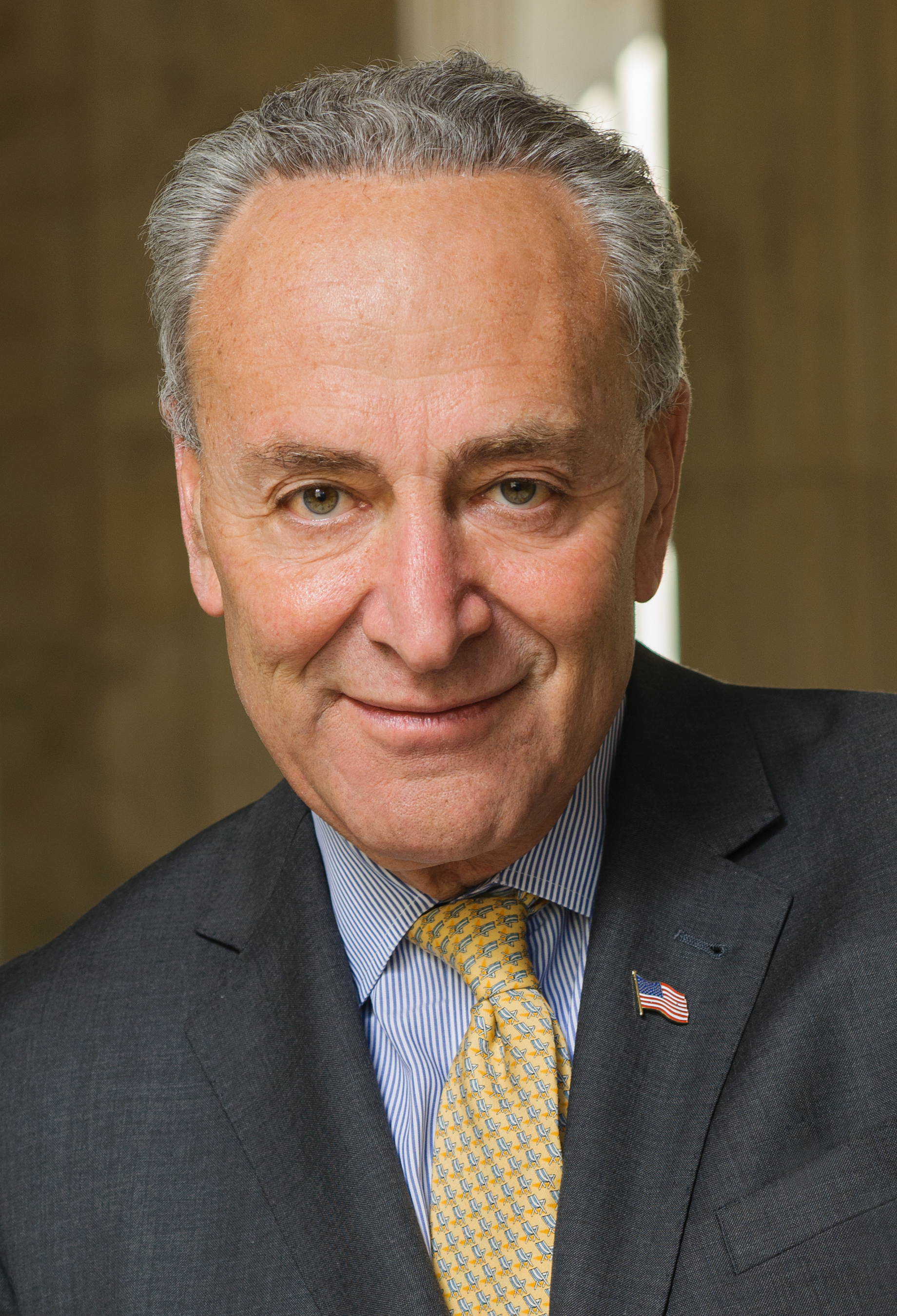
Charles Schumer

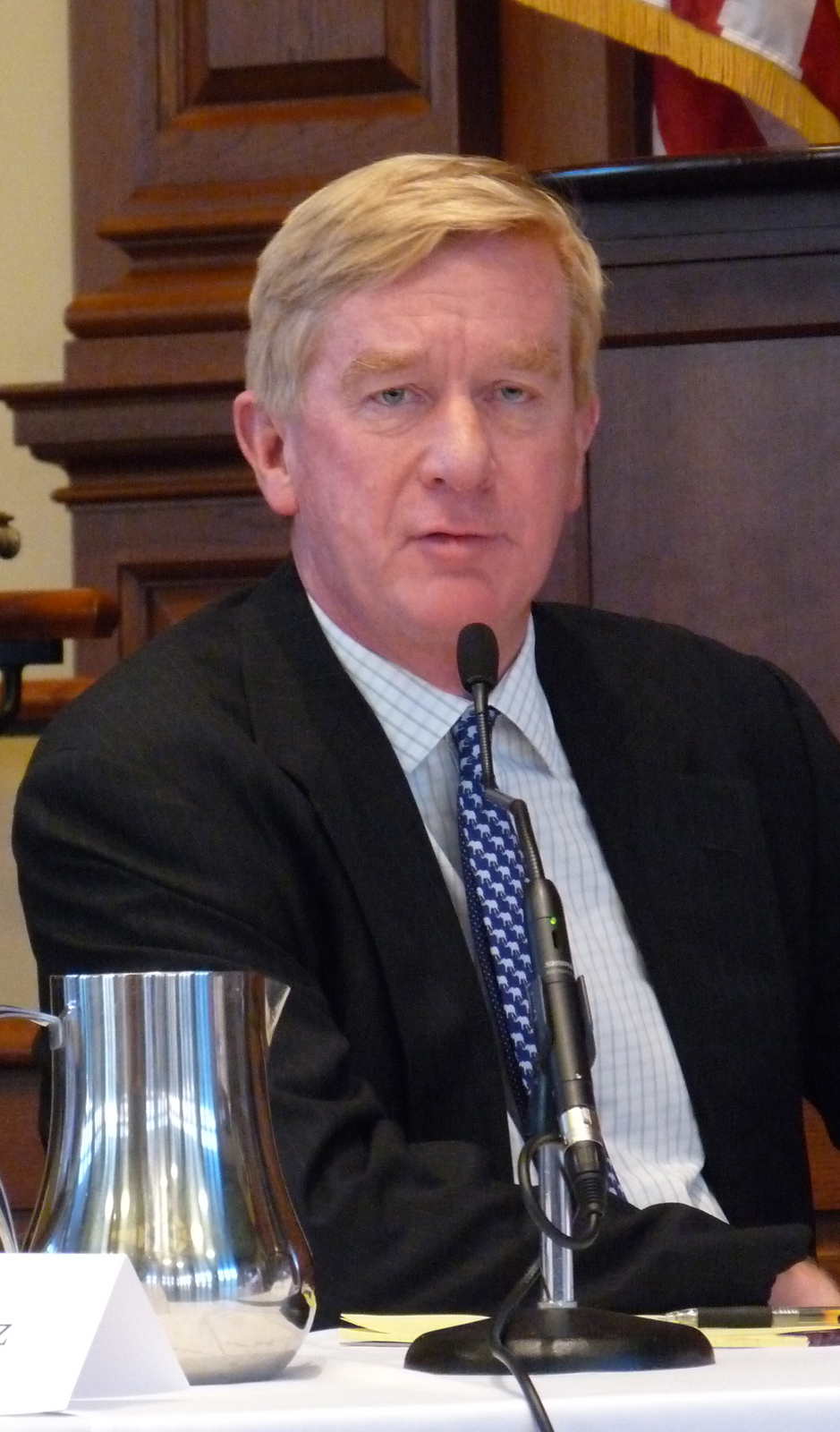
William Weld

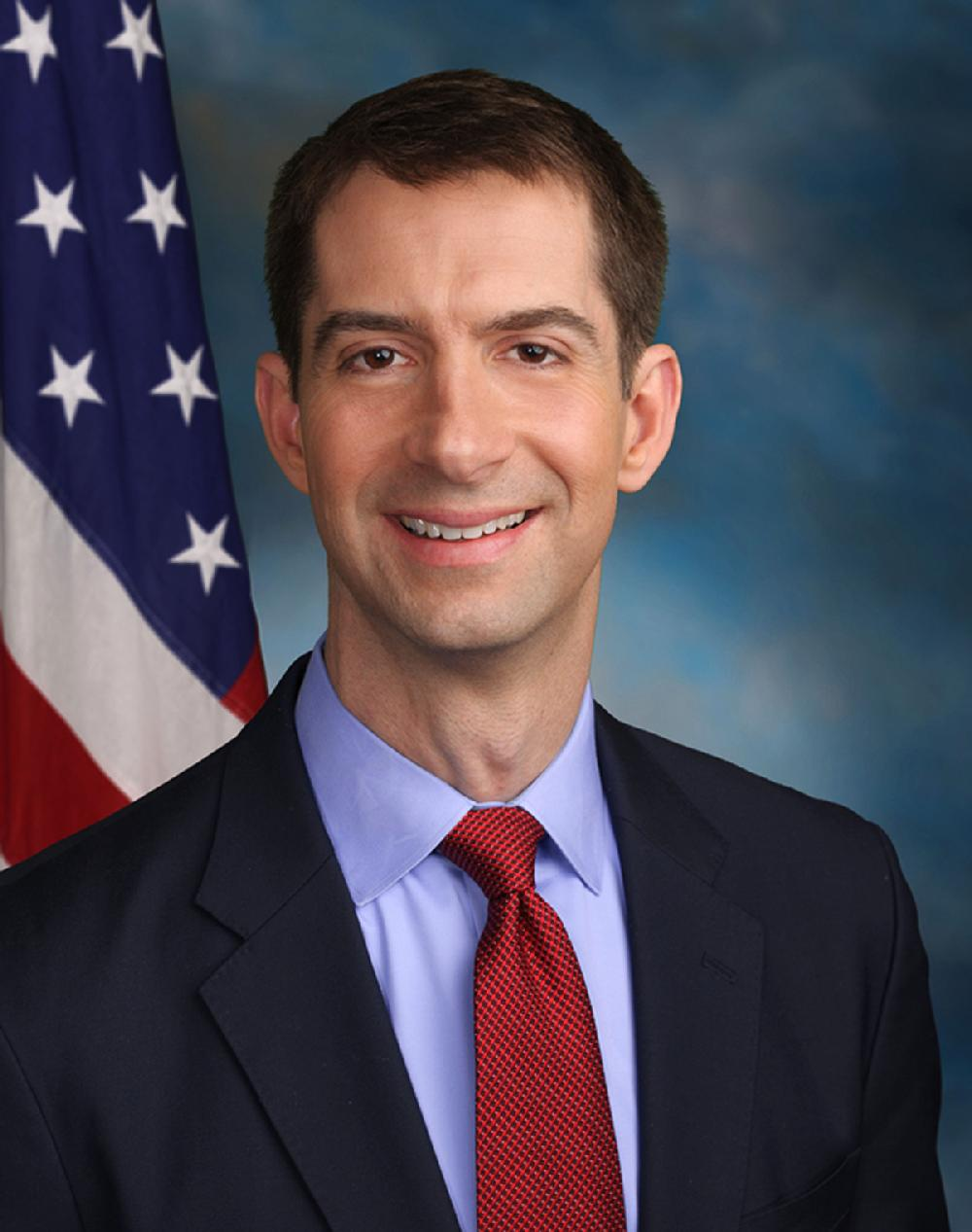
Tom Cotton

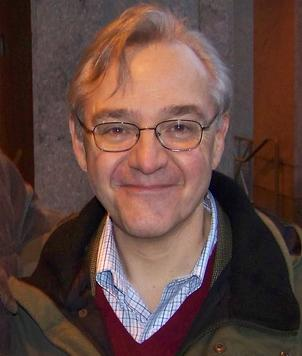
E. J. Dionne

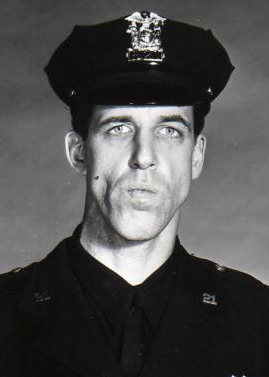
Fred Gwynne

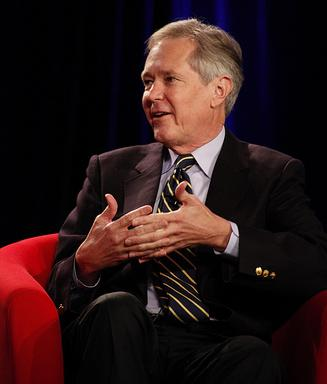
James Fallows

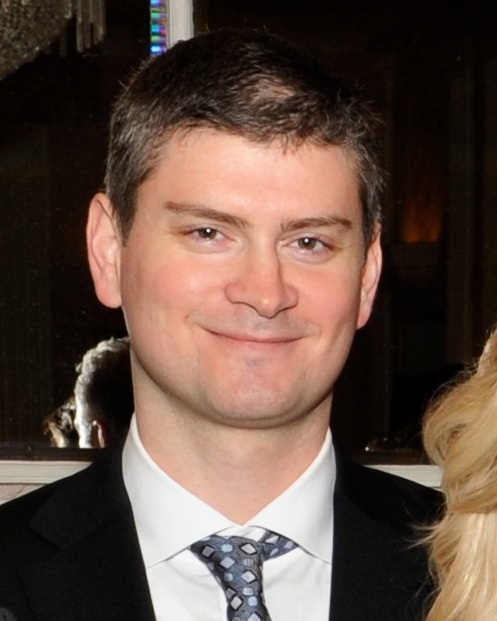
Michael Schur

Other notable residents include John Brademas, Amy Brenneman, Thomas Lauderdale, Martin Feldstein, Lauren Greenfield, Andre Gregory, Alan Keyes, Bernard Law, Robert Leiken, Donal Logue, Lance Oppenheim, William P. Perry, Alison Rogers, Peter Sellars, Courtney B. Vance, Zaid Al-Rifai, Richard Drayton, William S. Burroughs, Jack Lemmon, Michael Weishan, Claire Saffitz, Jeremy J. Shapiro, John Kerr, Frederik X, King of Denmark, and Hudson Yang.

General John Burgoyne was imprisoned in Apthorp during the American Revolution. Additionally, John F. Kennedy (political rival to aforementioned Henry Cabot Lodge Jr.) met with his senior thesis adviser in the Coolidge Room. Aaron Copland lived in the House as a guest.

== In fiction ==
In the 1981 novel Death in a Tenured Position by Amanda Cross, the book's detective Kate Fansler attends a paper on Browning's Fra Lippo Lippi read at a meeting of the Harvard Iambics in the Adams House SCR to attempt to discover 'the state of the English department' after the murder of one of its number.
