= Hunter Beard =

American rapper

- Origin: Little Rock, Arkansas, United States
- Genres: Hip hop, rock
- Occupations: Rapper, record producer, businessman
- Instrument: Vocals
- Years active: 2007–present
- Label: Lion Pride Music Group
- Website: hunterbeard.com

Hunter Beard (born July 28, 1981) is an American rapper, record producer, businessman, and controversial public figure, from Little Rock, Arkansas. He has an extensive criminal history and had several stints in prison through his early teens to early twenties before making a life change through music, business, and charitable acts. Hunter is based out of the South Bay of Los Angeles with his wife. He is best known for the radio single "Want it with us" and the YouTube video for the song "When you come home".

== Early life ==
Suspended several times throughout his early high school years, Beard eventually dropped out of high school in the 10th grade and later earned a GED while incarcerated at Cummins Penitentiary.

=== Criminal past ===
Beard has an extensive criminal record, including fourteen felony counts ranging from robbery to drugs. At thirteen, he began selling drugs. This began a near decade of bad decisions and issues with the law. Four years later, at 17, Hunter was sentenced to his first of three prison terms for robbery.

== Music career ==
=== Beginnings ===
During his last stint in prison, Beard dictated lyrics on a handheld voice recorder. Knowing he needed to avoid falling back into old habits once he was released, hip hop became an obsession. A prison guard who heard his recordings approached him about what he planned to do after he was released. She said that she could help connect him with the music promoter Flipside Entertainment. After listening to his recordings, the promoter offered him the chance to open for Chris Brown. Unfortunately, Beard was not released in time. Yet, with validation of his skill in hand, he persevered through the remainder of his sentence with a new found drive to exit prison with a positive focus and to create music.

In 2006, Beard met fellow Little Rock rapper Big Kennedy and formed The Definition. The two began recording the album "Music for the Def". From that album, the song "Want it with us" became the first single airing on both Arkansas radio station Hot 96.5 and Power 92. Power 92 called Hunter on air to play the song on the "Pump It or Dump it". The song was unanimously voted to stay with 100% of the votes in favor. The song then spread across the states of Oklahoma, Alabama, Louisiana and Florida.

=== Move to Los Angeles (2008–2012) ===
Upon moving to Los Angeles, Beard began building a fan base by playing at the many notable venues of the Hollywood Boulevard and Sunset Strip like Whisky a Go Go and The Viper Room. He set up a clothing line and married his long-time girlfriend. L.A. Weekly took notice and writer Rebecca Haithcoat dubbed Beard a born hustler.

From there Beard and his business partner Keddy Mac started to put out videos like "All I Know" and "No Hope for The Man".

In 2011, Anonymous Talent interviewed Beard. He discussed how his music has multiple styles and tries to avoid sticking to one song type and instead try new things.

It was during this time a fan created a video for the song "When You Come Home", which has become Beard's most popular video on YouTube. The video and song drove to the heart of those loved ones away at war. In an interview with the web series Discover, Beard tells how the song was quick to be written as it came from his real life experience of being apart from his wife while in prison. Though the similarities are vast, he felt it could be related to the experience of a family separated by war.

== Discography ==
=== Studio albums ===
- Scars (2007) – Released Exclusively Online
- Music for the Def by The Definition (2008) – Hunter Beard & Big Kennedy
- Solar Bipolar (2011)

=== Appears on ===
- "Get Hypnotized" Music Hustle 3 featuring Lil’ Wayne, Too Short & Ying-Yang Twins
