= Isaac T. Gillam =

African American pilot and aerospace engineer

Isaac T. Gillam IV
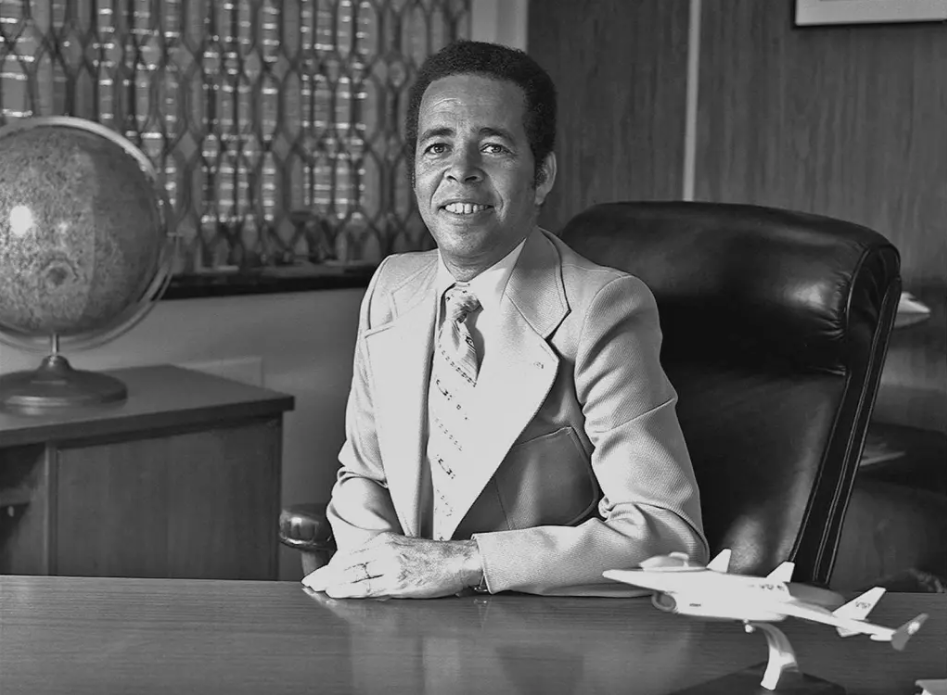
- Portrait in 1978
- Born: February 23, 1932; Little Rock, Arkansas, U.S.
- Died: December 5, 2022 (aged 90); Walnut, California, U.S.
- Education: Howard University (BA)
- Occupations: Pilot; aerospace engineer
- Years active: 1953–2003
- Spouse: Norma Jean Hughes (m. 1956)
- Awards: NASA Distinguished Service Medal (1976)

Isaac Thomas Gillam, IV (February 23, 1932 – December 5, 2022) was an American aerospace engineer. He was director of NASA's Dryden Flight Research Center from 1977 to 1981 and was the first African American to lead a NASA center.

== Early life ==
Gillam was born in 1932 to an African American family in Little Rock, Arkansas. He was the eldest child and only son of Ethel McNeil Reynolds and Isaac Thomas Gillam, III. His parents worked in Washington, D.C., his mother at the U.S. Department of State and his father at the Postal Service, and he visited them in the summers. Both of his father's parents were principals, and Isaac (nicknamed "Ike") excelled academically. In 1948, he graduated top of his class at Dunbar High School, named after writer Paul Laurence Dunbar.

He studied mathematics at Howard University in Washington, D.C., where his father and grandfather had previously studied, graduating in 1953. Gillam later pursued graduate studies at the Tennessee Agricultural & Industrial State University in Nashville.

== Career ==
News of the Tuskegee Airmen sparked an interest in aviation for Gillam while still a student at Howard. After graduating, he joined the U.S. Air Force as a 2nd Lieutenant, where he served for ten years. Gillam fought as a pilot in the Korean War and served as launch crew commander for missile silos under the Strategic Air Command. In 1957, he joined Tennessee State University as an assistant professor of Air Science in the Air Force Reserve Officer Training Corps, where he also pursued graduate courses until 1961.

Gillam joined NASA in 1963 as a resources management specialist for the Delta rocket program, which the agency used to launch communication and weather satellites. He was appointed assistant program manager in 1966 and Delta program manager in 1968. Gillam was appointed program manager of Small Launch Vehicles, including the Delta and Scout rocket programs, and of international projects with the European Space Agency (ESA).

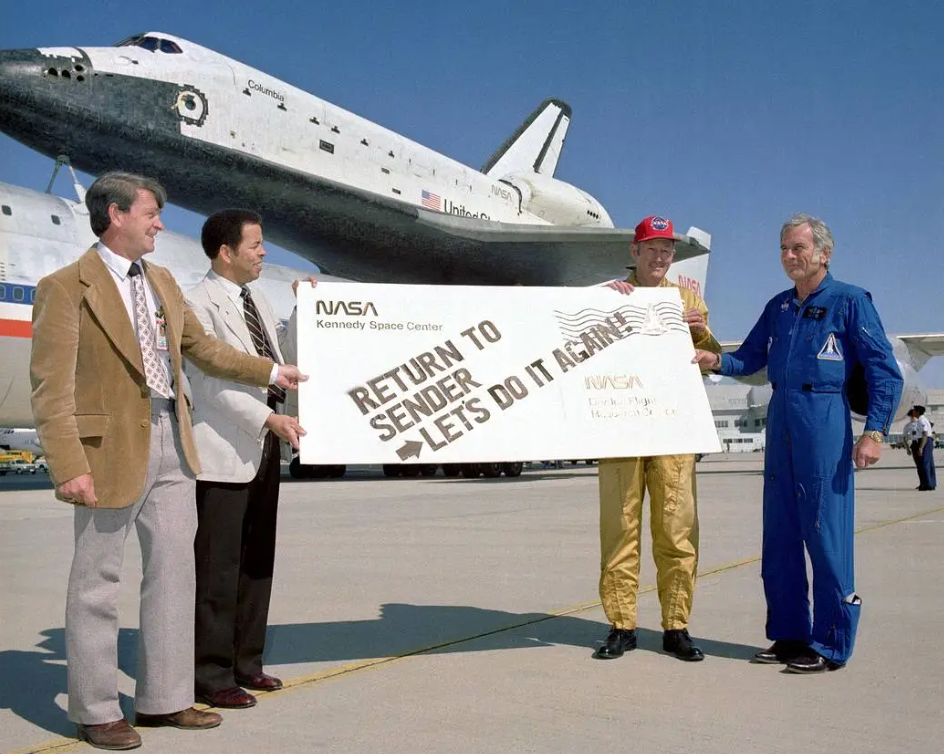
Gillam and others holding a humorous sendoff of Space Shuttle Columbia after landing at Edwards AFB (April 28, 1981)

He led approach and landing tests for the Space Shuttle Enterprise and Space Shuttle Columbia as the director of space shuttle operations.

Gillam was appointed deputy director of NASA Dryden Flight Research Center on October 30, 1977, and full director on June 18, 1978, becoming the first Black person to lead a NASA center. He was served as director of Dryden until October 1, 1981.

He became a charter member of the Senior Executive Service on July 13, 1979, under President Jimmy Carter. Gillam was appointed a science advisor to the White House, serving under President Ronald Reagan as special assistant associate administrator for the Office of Science and Technology Policy. Gillam also served as assistant associate administrator for NASA's Office of Space Flight (OSF) for two years, and as associate administrator for the Office of Commercial Programs (OCP) for three years. He received NASA's highest award in 1976.

In 1987, he transitioned to the private sector in aerospace, becoming Vice President for Mission and Computing Support at OAO Corp. (acquired by Lockheed Martin in 2001) and then Senior Vice President for Aerospace. In 1997, Gillam joined AlliedSignal (acquired by Honeywell in 1999) as a program manager before retiring in 2003.

He was a fellow of the American Astronautical Society (AAS), an associate fellow of the American Institute of Aeronautics and Astronautics (AIAA), and a member of the Air Force Association, National Defense Preparedness Association, and the American Management Association.

He lived in Los Angeles until his death in 2022.

== Awards ==
- NASA Distinguished Service Medal (1976)
- NAACP Outstanding Achievement Award (1980)
- NASA Exceptional Service Medal (1981)
- Howard University Alumni Award (1981)
- NASA Exceptional Service Medal (1982)
- Presidential Rank Award of Meritorious Executive (1986)
- Dunbar High School Legacy Award
- Arkansas Aviation Hall of Fame (2005)

== Personal life ==
Gillam met Norma Jean Hughes, a teacher, while at Tennessee State University. They wed on December 21, 1956, and were married for more than 65 years. The couple had 4 children.
