= FDR Suite at Adams House, Harvard University =

Rooms occupied by Franklin D. Roosevelt in 1900–1904

The FDR Suite (often abbreviated fdrsuite) is a set of rooms at Adams House, Harvard College, that were occupied by the 32nd president of the United States, Franklin Delano Roosevelt, from 1900 to 1904.

== Background ==
In January 1900, 18-year-old Roosevelt and his Groton friend Lathrop Brown engaged rooms in Westmorly Court, (now B-Entry of Adams House). Built in 1898 and designed by the noted architects Warren and Wetmore (who also were responsible for Grand Central Terminal in New York) Westmorly was the newest and most luxurious building on what was called Harvard's Gold Coast, an area of luxury apartments for wealthy University students. The first floor suite chosen by FDR was equipped with all the latest innovations – central steam heat, electricity, a modern "hygienic" bathroom, and contained over 600 square feet (56 m^{2}) of living space spread across four rooms, with 14' ceilings, French doors, and a working fireplace – all this when only a few buildings at the college enjoyed such modern conveniences. The rooms were meticulously decorated in high Edwardian style by FDR's mother Sara Delano Roosevelt and FDR himself, and were used by FDR during his entire four years at Harvard.

After FDR left Harvard, the rooms were occupied by a succession of students until 1961. In June 1961, during Eleanor Roosevelt's visit to the college, the former first lady dedicated a plaque commemorating FDR's time there, and the rooms were converted into a study, officially named "The FDR Suite". After a brief return to student housing in the early 2000s, the rooms were finally set aside in perpetuity with the intention of creating Harvard's first memorial to Franklin Delano Roosevelt.

== The restoration ==
Begun in 2008, the restoration of Roosevelt's room consumed 6 years of research and $300,000, and was largely completed in 2014. The effort was led by the Franklin Delano Roosevelt Foundation Inc (formerly: the FDR Suite Foundation, an independent 501(c)3 US public charity led by a group of interested individuals and Harvard alumni who privately raised the capital required to complete the project. The Suite is fully furnished with examples of period furniture, and contains almost 2000 period objects, much of it rare Harvard ephemera re-assembled in Cambridge from private collections worldwide. The restoration is intended not only to shed new light on the early years of one of the most influential American presidents of the 20th century, but to form one of the most illustrative collections of student life in the Gilded Age life anywhere in the world. The Suite is not open to the general public, but is routinely opened for Harvard students, alumni and affiliates, and maintains an active web presence. The Suite also functions as the physical and spiritual home of the Foundation, which maintains an active presence at the college, sponsoring scholarships under its FDR Global Citizenship Program, and also hosting the programs of the new Franklin Delano Roosevelt Center for Global Engagement, an innovation diplomacy think-tank. The Foundation has also published an illustrated history of Roosevelt, FDR: A Life in Pictures, which features pictures of the Suite.

== See also ==
- FDR Presidential Library and Museum http://www.fdrlibrary.marist.edu/
- Adams House

== Primary sources ==
- Roosevelt, Franklin D.; Roosevelt, Elliot, ed. FDR: His Personal Letters (4 vol., 1947); volume one covers Roosevelt's years at Groton and Harvard; pg 371 gives a physical description of the Suite, and includes Roosevelt's own drawing of the floor plan; subsequent letters describe the rooms' decor and furnishing.

== Architectural references ==
- Bainbridge Bunting, Margaret Henderson Floyd, Harvard: An Architectural History, Harvard University Press, 1985.
- Shand-Tucci, Douglass, Harvard University: An Architectural Tour, Princeton Architectural Press, 2001

== Biographies of FDR with details of the FDR Suite ==
- Freidel, Frank. Franklin D. Roosevelt: A Rendezvous with Destiny (1990), One-volume scholarly biography; covers entire life
- Freidel, Frank. Franklin D. Roosevelt (4 vol 1952–73), the most detailed scholarly biography; ends in 1934.
- Smith, Jean Edward FDR 2007 ISBN 978-1-4000-6121-1
- Ward, Geoffrey C. Before The Trumpet: Young Franklin Roosevelt, 1882–1905 details of FDR's Harvard Years
- Weishan, Michael FDR: A Life in Pictures
