= Alison Rogers =

American journalist (born 1966)

Alison Rogers (born in 1966 in Little Rock, Arkansas) is an American journalist and real estate broker. Her memoir of her first year in real estate, Diary of a Real Estate Rookie, was published in 2007 and is now in its second printing. She is currently a Manhattan-based real estate broker at the boutique firm of Upstairs Realty.

== Biography ==
Rogers was born in Little Rock, Arkansas, and is a 1987 summa cum laude graduate of Harvard University. She subsequently became a reporter for Fortune and then the founding editor of the real estate section of The New York Post. After two years at the newspaper, Rogers became an active participant in the field she had covered.

== Publications ==
Rogers has written for The New York Times, Money, and the Chicago Reader, among others. Diary of a Real Estate Rookie, which expanded upon her weekly column of the same name for the real-estate trade site Inman News, is a memoir of her first year in real estate. It was published by Kaplan Publishing, earning praise for its combination of witty anecdotes and tips for buyers, sellers and renters.

"How to Find the Perfect Home," an article based on one of the book's chapters, ran as a supplement in the August 2007 issue of Money.

"After You Read the Listings, Your Agent Reads You," an article about the psychology of real estate, ran in the March 26, 2013 issue of The New York Times.

== Advice ==
Since 2008, Rogers has offered real estate advice and commentary to a national audience. She served as the first "real-estate guru" on FiLife.com, a personal finance site launched as a joint venture of Dow Jones & Company and IAC. Subsequently, she has written the column "Ask the Agent" for MoneyWatch.com and offered real estate advice to young women on the LearnVest personal finance site. In 2011, she became a columnist for Time.com's Moneyland. She is a frequent commentator in real estate chat rooms, where she is known as "front_porch" and signs "ali r".

== Real estate ==
Rogers specializes in a Hollywood clientele and the Manhattan neighborhoods of Chelsea, Greenwich Village, and the Upper West Side. Careful to protect her clients' privacy, she refers to the television actor in Diary of a Real Estate Rookie as Bogie and his girlfriend as Bacall.
