= Governorships of Bill Clinton =

Political history of Bill Clinton (1978–1992)

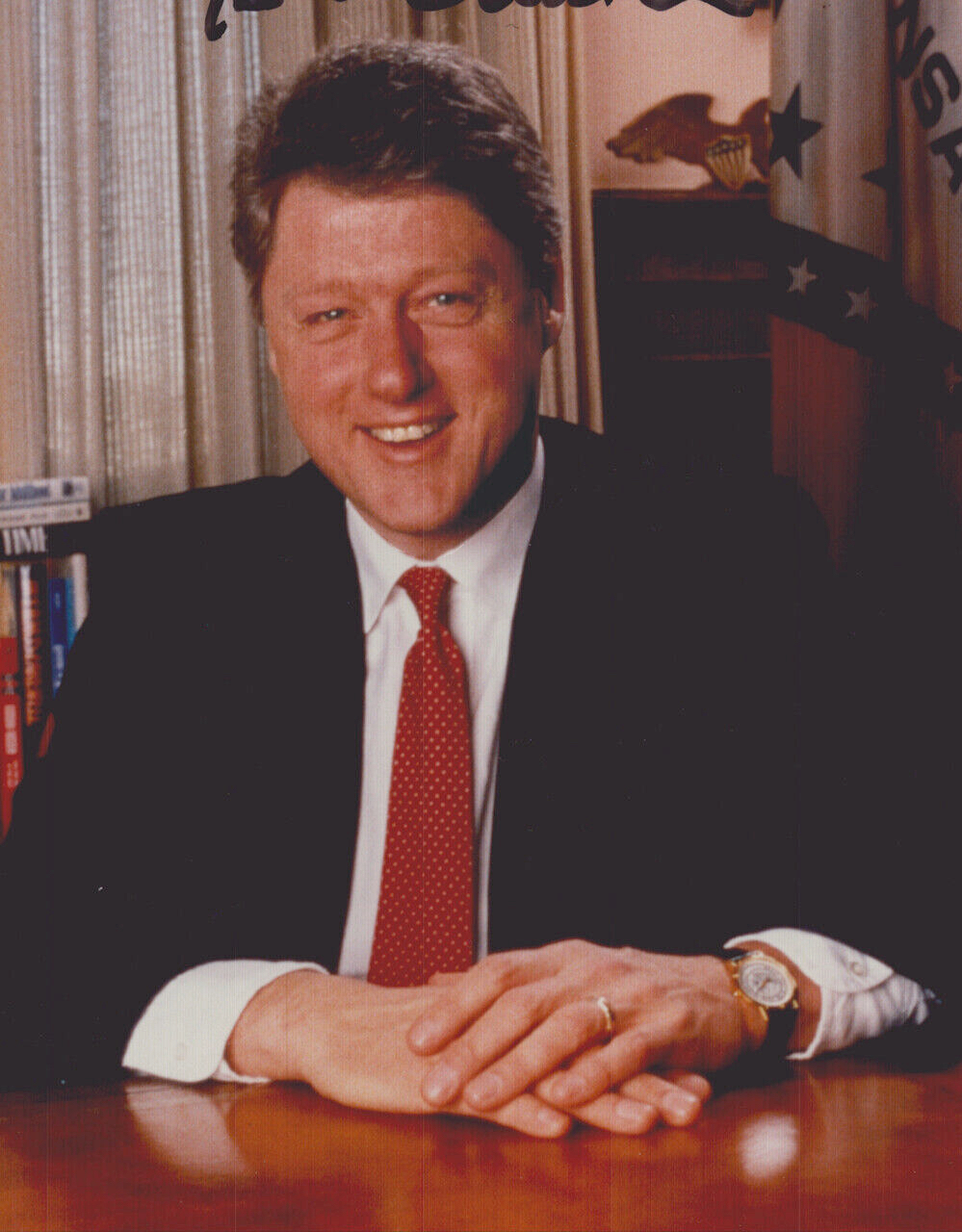
- Clinton in 1992
- Governorships of Bill Clinton
- Governor: Bill Clinton
- Party: Democratic
- Seat: Governor's Mansion
- First term January 9, 1979 – January 19, 1981
- Election: 1978
- Second term January 11, 1983 – December 12, 1992
- Election: 1982; 1984; 1986; 1990
- Seal of Arkansas

Bill Clinton served two tenures as governor of Arkansas. Elected in 1978, Clinton first served as governor for a single term from 1979 until 1981, losing his bid for re-election in 1980. After a two-year interregnum, Clinton returned to the governorship after winning the 1982 election. Clinton would be elected to five further terms (terms were extended from two years to four years beginning with the 1986 election), serving until mid-December 1992, when he resigned amid his transition into the U.S. presidency after having been elected president in the 1992 presidential election. Clinton was the second-longest serving governor in the state's history, after Orval Faubus.

Clinton's first governorship (1979–1981) saw him pursue many liberal policies. He had some successes, including successes with a rural healthcare reform effort by a taskforce that he had appointed his wife, Hillary, to lead. However, his term also saw the implementation of an unpopular motor vehicle tax. After Clinton returned to office for his second governorship in 1983, he was more centrist and was more selective as to what battles he pursued, zeroing in on particular priorities. One main priority was the state's economy, with Clinton providing tax incentives to businesses. Another priority was education, with Clinton and his wife, Hillary, overseeing the creation of significant education reforms. Other matters Clinton addressed included healthcare and lobbying reforms.

== Leadership style ==
Arkansas' state government was weaker than those of most other states. In addition, at the time Clinton was governor, the state government raised less revenue and spent less money per capita than any other U.S. state government, even after several tax increases over the course of Clinton's governorship. In addition, the state constitution permitted the legislature to overturn gubernatorial vetos with a simple majority. These factors meant Clinton had fewer tools at his disposal than governors of many other states.

In May 1992, amid Clinton's presidential candidacy, David Lautner of the Los Angeles Times wrote,

Far from consistently taking on powerful interests, Clinton often has cultivated close relations with his state's power structure. At times, he has dragged his feet in confronting powerful interests, particularly in areas such as environmental pollution...His office possesses far fewer direct powers than those wielded by governors in states like California. And he has faced an often recalcitrant Legislature made up of part-time lawmakers, many of whom for years literally have been on the payrolls of...major interests...Clinton has built up considerable power through his control of appointments to state boards and commissions and through his influence over where the state spends money. He often has been able to gather votes in the Legislature by promising jobs or state projects to key allies.

Lautner also observed that Clinton "often made compromise his hallmark."

Clinton attained the nickname "Slick Willie" from critics during his governorship for his alleged ability to use charisma as a tool for political trickery.

In his first governorship, Clinton sought to implement a large number of liberal policies. After he returned to the governorship in 1983, Clinton was more narrowly focused on specific issues, limiting which battles he fought.

In 1992, Dan Fesperman of The Baltimore Sun characterized Clinton's approach to governing in his first governorship as undiplomatic and bullying. He observed that Clinton learned from his failed re-election, providing more sharply focused leadership during his second governorship. Fesperman observed that, in his second governorship, Clinton obtained a "too nice image" but still demonstrated a willingness to flex his power.

In his second governorship, Clinton used opinion polling to inform what policy positions he chose to prioritize, effectively running his gubernatorial administration somewhat like a political campaign, effectively running a permanent campaign. He relied on Dick Morris for polling expertise. Clinton was centrist in his positioning and policy during his second governorship.

In 1991, a Newsweek poll of U.S. governors saw Clinton's fellow governors rank him as the "most effective" U.S. governor.

== Scandals and accusations ==
During his time as governor in the 1980s, Arkansas was the center of a drug smuggling operation through Mena Airport. CIA agent Barry Seal allegedly imported three to five billion dollars' worth of cocaine through the airport, and the operation was linked to the Iran-Contra affair. Clinton was accused of knowing about this operation, although nothing could be proven against him. Arkansas journalist Sam Smith tied him to various questionable business dealings, including having ties to convicted cocaine distributor and bond trader Dan Lasater and having abused the Arkansas Development Finance Authority as his personal piggy bank. Clinton was also accused by Gennifer Flowers to have used cocaine as governor and his half-brother Roger was sentenced to prison in 1985 for possession and smuggling of cocaine, but was later pardoned by his brother after serving his sentence. During his time in Arkansas, there were also other scandals such as the Whitewater controversy involving the Clintons' real estate dealings and Bill Clinton was accused of serious sexual misconduct in Arkansas, including allegations of using the Arkansas State Police to gain access to women (Troopergate affair). The killing of Don Henry and Kevin Ives in 1987 started various conspiracy theories that accused Clinton and the Arkansas state authorities of covering up the crime.

== First governorship (1979–1981) ==
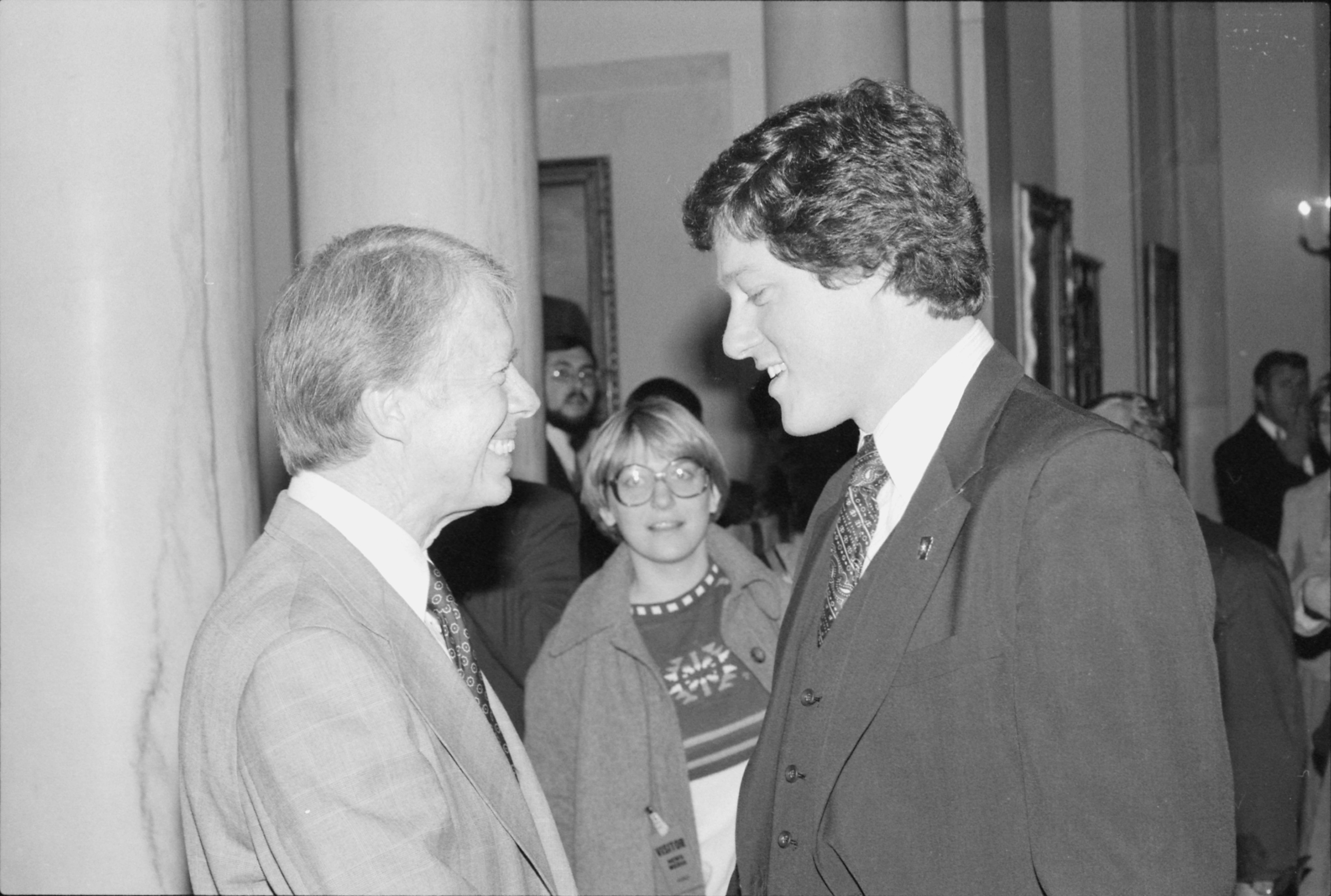
Governor-elect Clinton meets with President Jimmy Carter in 1978

In 1978, Clinton entered the Arkansas gubernatorial primary. At 31 years old, he was one of the youngest gubernatorial candidates in the state's history. Clinton was elected governor of Arkansas in 1978, having defeated the Republican candidate Lynn Lowe, a farmer from Texarkana. Clinton was 32 years old when he took office, the youngest governor in the country at the time and the second-youngest governor in the history of Arkansas, after John Selden Roane. Due to his youthful appearance, Clinton was often called the "Boy Governor". He worked on educational reform and directed the maintenance of Arkansas's roads, with wife Hillary leading a successful committee on healthcare reform. However, his term included an unpopular motor vehicle tax and citizens' anger over the escape of Cuban refugees (from the Mariel boatlift) detained in Fort Chaffee in 1980.

Clinton pursued an agenda with a broad array of liberal policies. In May 1992, David Lautner wrote in the Los Angeles Times,

In his first term as governor, from 1979-80, Clinton...[took] on most of the major interests in the state. Clinton took on the utility industry over electricity rates. His environmental aides held hearings around the state attacking the timber industry for clear-cutting forests. His state health commissioner pushed for more rural health clinics and fought with the medical association. Clinton pushed for higher automobile license fees to pay for highway improvements.

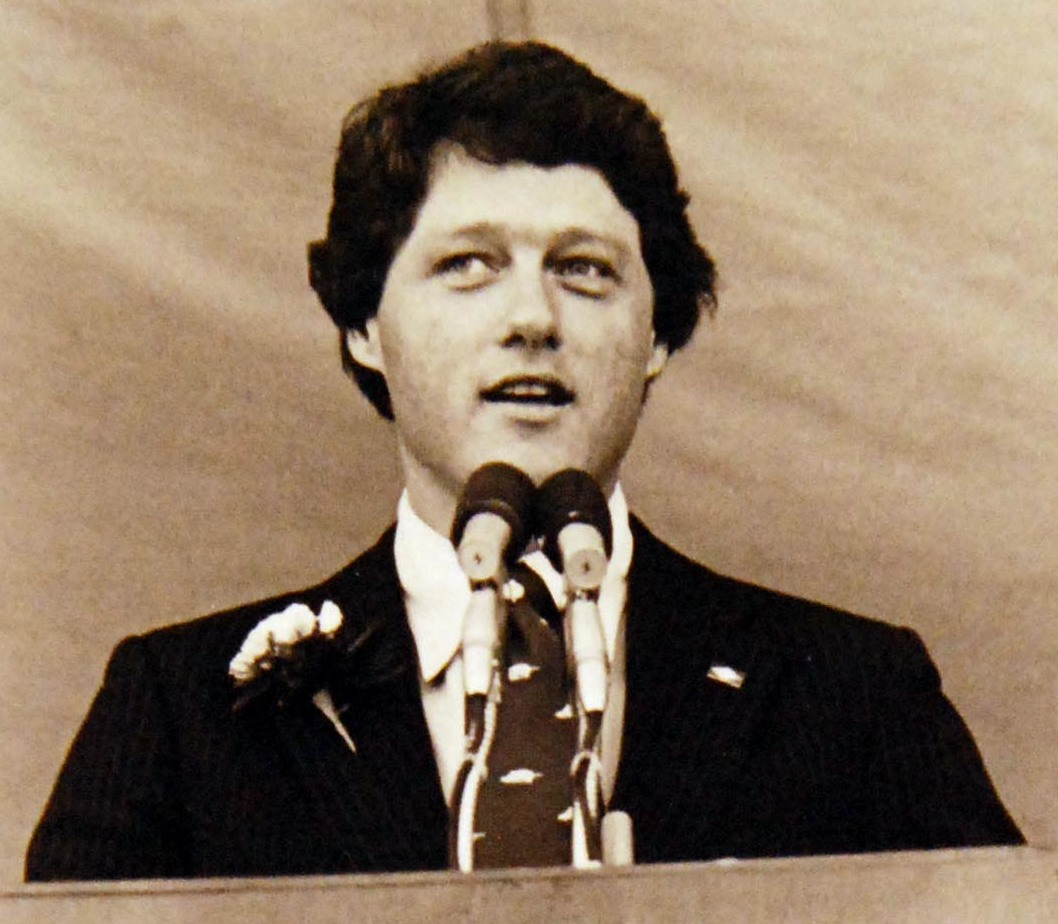
Clinton speaking at the commissioning ceremonies of USS Arkansas (CGN-41) in October 1980

The biggest act of Clinton's first governorship was a highway program. The expensive program was paid for with increases to fees and taxes, including an increase in fuel taxes, registration fees on trucks and automobiles, and other vehicles fees. The increases to fees and taxes hurt Clinton politically, and he would personally blame his defeat for re-election on backlash regarding vehicle registration fees.

In the first year of the governorship, Clinton appointed his wife, Hillary, to serve as the chair of the state's Rural Health Advisory Committee, tasked with working on the issue of providing healthcare to the more isolated areas of the state.

As Governor, Clinton supported the death penalty. According to some sources, Clinton had previously been an opponent of the death penalty in his early years, but changed his position by the time that he was governor. In 1979, Clinton commuted the death sentence of convicted murderer James L. Surridge. Surridge later committed another murder after being released from prison. Clinton would claim that he had been told by prison officials that Surridge, then 73 years of age, was sick and nearing his death at the time his sentence was commuted. Clinton commuted several long prison sentences as governor. In his first governorship, Clinton commuted 70 sentences. Forty of the commuted sentences had been life sentences.

Clinton proposed modest reforms to the state's education system. He also proposed regulation on pollution and opposed the timber industry's practice of clearcutting. Clinton floated the idea of determining the distribution of state funds to banks by using an assessment of the lending practices of banks. This move angered bankers. Clinton also sought to strengthen regulations on the ability of utility providers to increase their rates. This angered the utility companies. He also fought against the successful effort by Arkansas Power and Light, the state's largest energy company, to garner state funding to pay for the costs of the Grand Gulf Nuclear Station, a nuclear power plant in Port Gibson, Mississippi.

Rudy Moore Jr. and Stephen Smith helped lead the staffing of Clinton's administration. Many of the lawyers and secretarial staff that worked Clinton's office while Clinton was attorney general of Arkansas were brought into his gubernatorial administration. They also brought in out-of-state talent. Clinton, hoping for a greater level of scientific management, looked nationally for administrators to head many state departments. Smith himself served as Clinton's chief of staff. Clinton believed in cabinet government, seeing each cabinet member's role as advocating for their department's role in the state government and implementing Clinton's vision within their department. He promoted a number of state agencies to the Cabinet-level that previously did not enjoy this status. Early into his governorship, Clinton appointed Jim McDougal as director of economic development, a cabinet position.

In terms of economic development, Clinton's first gubernatorial administration did not focus heavily on large industry, instead focusing on helping to generate new small businesses, as well as foster technological innovation and research and development. Clinton also sought to decrease regulation that impeded investment and sought to shape the marketplace so that larger banks and investment companies might fund new small business ventures. Clinton created state departments that assisted entrepreneurs through consultation. He sought to use research at state universities to spur related enterprises. Clinton also worked to provide some assistance the state's smaller communities in their efforts to generate local economic development. He also directed some funding to small businesses that were doing innovative work related to agriculture.

In 1979, Clinton founded the Arkansas Governor's School, which was modeled after the Governor's School of North Carolina.

During Clinton's first governorship, there was a prevailing public perception that Clinton's gubernatorial administration was clumsy and chaotic in their handling of state government.

== Failed reelection and interval between tenures ==
Clinton was renominated by the Democratic Party in 1980. However, Monroe Schwarzlose received 31 percent of the vote against Clinton in the Democratic gubernatorial primary of the 1980 Arkansas gubernatorial election. Some suggested that Schwarzlose's unexpectedly high performance foreshadowed Clinton's defeat by Republican challenger Frank D. White in the general election. Clinton narrowly lost the general election to White, a relatively unknown Republican political newcomer. This defeat was notable, as the Democratic gubernatorial primary election had previously been roughly tantamount to election in Arkansas. Energy interests, banking interests, and timber interests had backed White in the election due to Clinton's disputes with these industries. As Clinton once joked, he became the youngest ex-governor in the nation's history.

After leaving office in January 1981, Clinton joined his friend Bruce Lindsey's Little Rock law firm of Wright, Lindsey and Jennings.

== Second governorship (1983–1992) ==
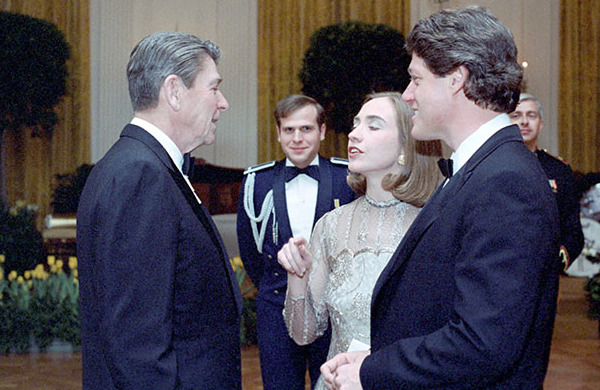
Clinton (right) and his wife Hillary (second from right) speak to President Ronald Reagan at a 1983 White House dinner honoring state governors

In 1982, he was elected governor a second time and retained the office for the next ten years. Effective with the 1986 election, Arkansas had changed its gubernatorial term of office from two to four years.

Clinton's final term as governor (1991–1992) was marked by a period of particularly extensive legislative success, due both to the resounding mandate he won from voters against a well-funded opponent in his preceding re-election, as well as the defeat of several major opponents of Clinton's in the state's legislature.

=== Economic policy ===
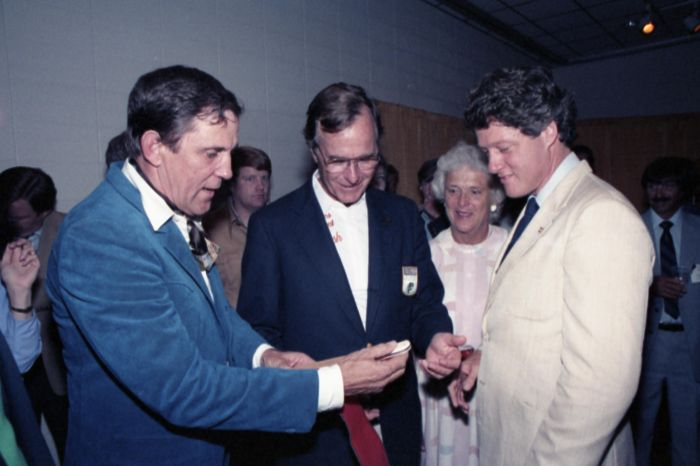
Clinton (right) joins Bassmaster Classic-founder Ray Scott (left), Vice President George H. W. Bush (second from left), and Second Lady Barbara Bush (third from left) at the 1984 Bassmaster Classic

During his second governorship, Clinton helped transform Arkansas's economy. The start of Clinton's second governorship occurred during the early recovery from the early 1980s recession, and much of Clinton's governorship ran concurrent with it. Arkansas was one of the United States' most impoverished states, and the state possessed more limited financial resources than other states. Due to this, Clinton made the state's economic development a primary focus.

Even towards the end of Clinton's governorship, Arkansas had issues with unemployment in poverty, ranking 50th in youth unemployment. Around the time of Clinton's 1992 presidential campaign, the Republican-leaning think tank Corporation for Enterprise Development ranked the state the "45th worst in which to work", an assessment which Clinton disputed.

Clinton often came into conflict with the AFL-CIO head J. Bill Becker, demonstrating resistance from trade unions to some of his policies.

During Clinton's governorship, the state's budget increased at a rate similar to the federal government. A challenge for Clinton's governorship was generating revenue to replace a decrease in federal funding under the presidencies of Ronald Reagan and George H. W. Bush (federal aid went from contributing 36% of Arkansas' state revenue in the early 1980s to 24% by 1990).

==== Taxes and corporate incentives ====
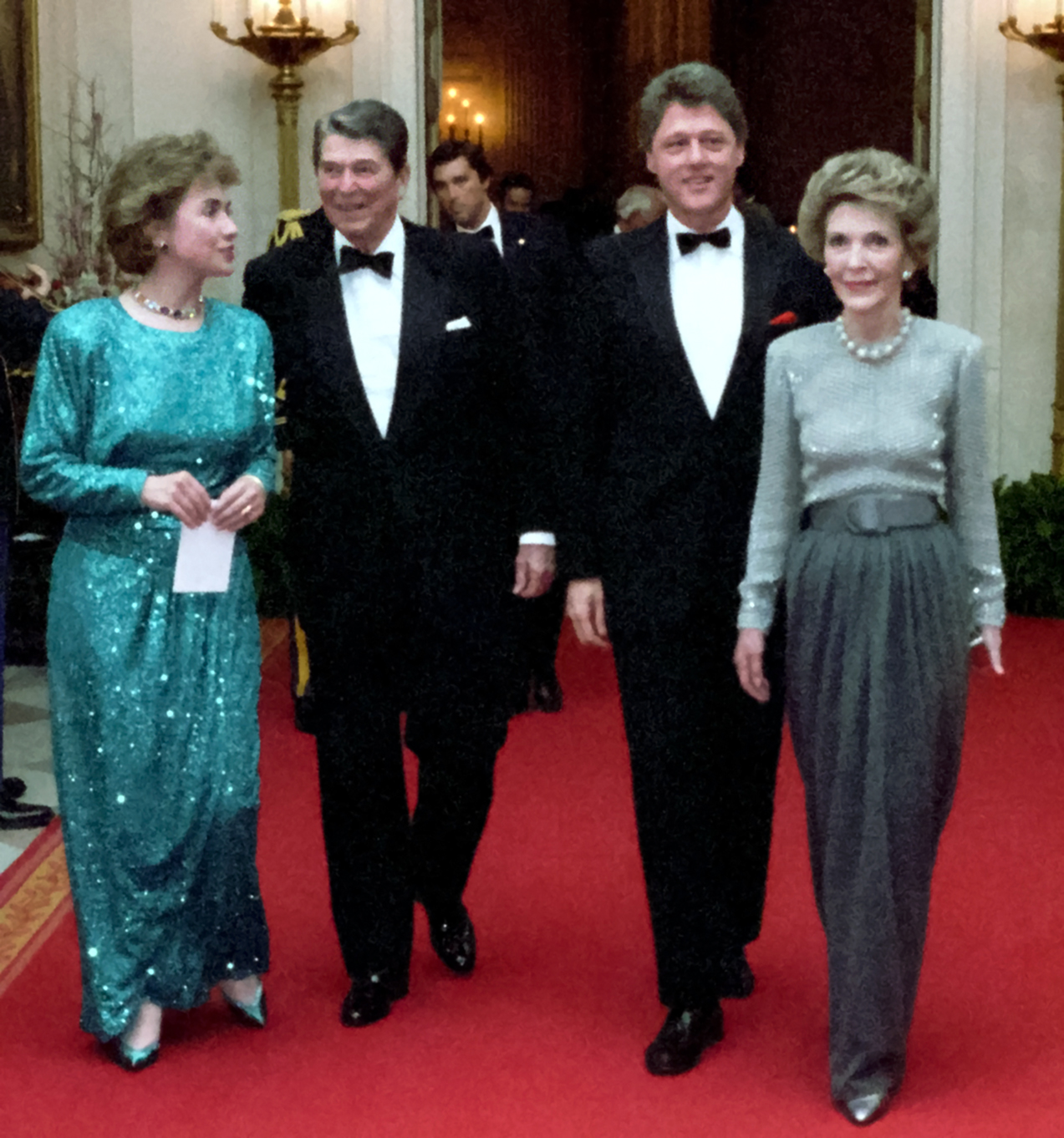
Governor and Mrs. Clinton with President Ronald Reagan and First Lady Nancy Reagan at a 1987 dinner honoring U.S. governors at the White House

To lure companies to the state, Clinton provided a number of tax breaks for new investment, which were in addition to the state's preexisting tax incentives. This, however, sacrificed potential state revenue. By 1992, tax incentives for businesses lost the state $400 million in potential tax revenue on an annual basis, roughly equivalent to 20% of the state's annual budget. In some instances, the tax incentives were praised as having positive impacts on attracting employers. In other instances, however, they were alleged by critics of having been ineffective and expensive for the state. Some critics alleged that the incentives largely subsidized investments that would have occurred regardless of whether tax incentives existed. Some tax incentives in the state, however, pre-dated Clinton and, by state constitution, would have required a three-quarters vote in the state legislature to be repealed.

In 1984, Clinton secured the creation of the Arkansas Development Finance Authority (ADFA). This organization was authorized to sell government-backed tax-exempt bonds to finance investments related to the growth of private businesses in the state. Per ADFA records, between 1985 and 1992, the state used $90 million of bonds to support roughly 70 private companies. This established 2,700 new jobs, while providing support to a further 3,000 jobs. This effort received criticism that accused the state of supporting wealthy companies that could have secured independent financing. There were also allegations that many of the companies that greatly benefited from this did so, in part, due to political connections.

Clinton's governorships (both his first and second governorships) saw a cumulative 27 tax increases. Nevertheless, by the end of Clinton's governorship, Arkansas still ranked the 4th-lowest among states in terms of the tax burden on its residents.

Arkansas' tax system was criticized as being among the nation's most regressive, and Clinton was criticized as having made them more regressive as governor. Corporate tax exemptions in the state placed a revenue burden that was largely filled by sales taxes, and sales taxes were often used by Clinton to generate new revenue for programs he created. Clinton relied so heavily on sales tax increases during his governorship because any increases to all other types of taxes would require a three-fourths approval from the state legislature, per the state's constitution. In 1991, Diane Blair observed that, in Arkansas, "there's a tremendous resistance to taxes". In 1991, Clinton was able to secure approval from the state legislature for legislation that exempted many of the state's lowest-income residents from paying taxes, and which also increased the corporate income taxes that the largest companies in the state would pay. For senior citizens, Clinton removed the sales tax from medications and increased the home property-tax exemption.

Clinton particularly focused on passing a significant amount of economic development legislation in 1985. The legislature approved most of Clinton's proposed program, which included reforms to the state's banking law. The program also included startup funding for tech businesses and significant tax incentives to encourage industries in the state to increase production and expand their workforce. For the following six years, Arkansas was a leader among U.S. states in terms of the creation of new jobs. However, few newly created jobs paid high wages, and the state continued to have one of the lowest average incomes of any U.S. state.

During the governorship, the extent of economic growth somewhat varied geographically.

=== Education reform ===
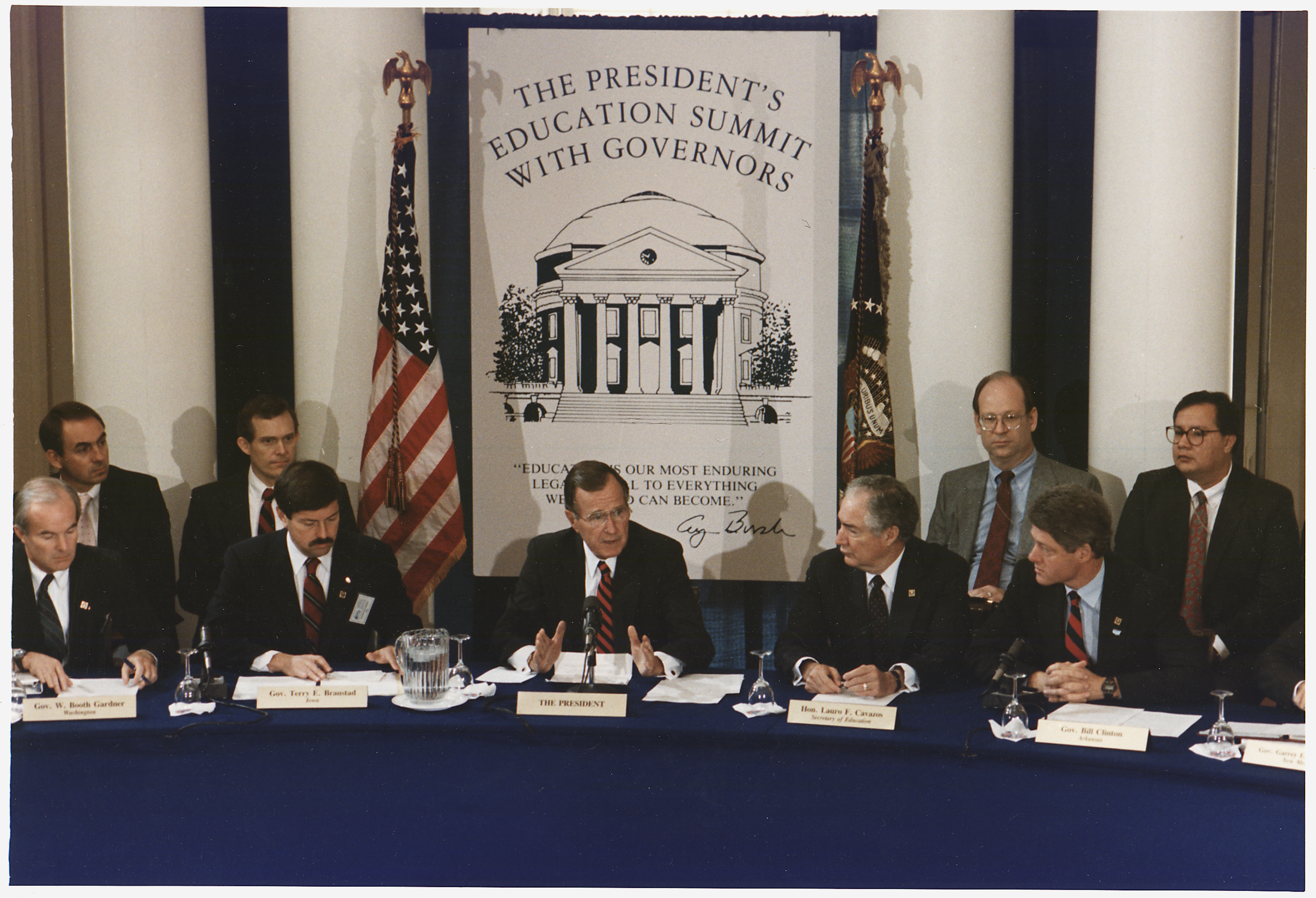
Clinton (seated at the far right of table) joins other governors and President George H. W. Bush (center) at the president's education summit with governors in September 1989

In his second governorship, Clinton improved the state's education system. Education reform was a primary focus of his second governorship. The state came under a court order to improve its education system. The ruling saw Supreme Court of Arkansas rule shortly into Clinton's second governorship that the means by which the state funded schools was unconstitutional due to unequal distribution of resources to different school districts. This provided Clinton with an opportunity to successfully persuade the legislature to pass education reforms.

The Arkansas Education Standards Committee was chaired by Clinton's wife, Hillary, who was also an attorney as well as the chair of the Legal Services Corporation. The committee transformed Arkansas's education system. Proposed reforms included more spending for schools (supported by a sales tax increase), better opportunities for gifted children, vocational education, higher teachers' salaries, more course variety, and compulsory teacher competency exams. The reforms passed in September 1983 after Clinton called a special legislative session — the longest in Arkansas history. Most of the education reform legislation that Clinton proposed to the legislature was adopted. Many have considered this the greatest achievement of the Clinton governorship. Clinton's reforms overhauled the state's formula for distributing funds to schools. The reform's increases in state aid to local school districts especially emphasized assistance to school districts that were located in poorer rural areas. The reforms also implemented statewide standards for curriculum. It also implemented competency tests for educators. Clinton persuaded the Arkansas Board of Education to put in place more stringent accreditation standards, as had been recommended by the Arkansas Education Standards Committee. One of the most controversial aspects of Clinton's education reforms was the competency test for teachers, which was strongly opposed by the state's teachers union. Clinton's education reforms received praise from some experts as having improved the state's education. The plan also required a one-cent sales tax increase. After it was implemented, one of the state's standardized test scores improved. However, the state's performance on other national standardized tests declined, perhaps relating to a decline in the High School dropout rate.

In the years after the reforms were made, there were efforts by local school districts to lessen the strictness of state standards, making arguments that they were too expensive to achieve. However, Clinton refused to compromise on this, believing these standards were needed to improve the state's education and decrease its poverty.

In 1987 and 1989, Clinton was unsuccessful in his efforts to pass tax increases that would providing further funding for education. In 1989 and 1991, Clinton passed legislation for additional educational programs, which included making Arkansas the second U.S. state program to enable school choice, the merging of several small school districts for efficiency, the provision $1,000 annual collegiate scholarships for poor and middle-income pupils, increased teacher salaries, and an overhaul to vocational education programs. Additionally, in 1990, the state passed a corporate income tax increase to fund vocational education programs. However, some state legislators objected to Clinton later taking credit for that increase.

Clinton gave his personal backing to national early child education programs like Head Start. Clinton and his wife introduced a program in the state known as the Home Instruction Program for Pre-School Youth (HIPPY). Modeled after an Israeli program, it trained low-income parents on reading and on how to educate their kids on basic skills. By 1991, the program was serving 4,500 low-income families. In the later years of his governorship, Clinton gave $15 million annually in funding for early childhood education.

Even with reforms and significant improvements to education, the state still ranked 49th among U.S. states in school spending and teacher salaries towards the end of Clinton's governorship.

=== Crime and punishment ===
Clinton continued to support the death penalty. In his 1982 election campaign, he pledged that he would no longer commute first-degree murder sentences. Remarking on his support for the death penalty, in 1992, Clinton declared that Democrats "should no longer feel guilty about protecting the innocent". During Clinton's final term as governor, Arkansas performed its first executions since 1964 (the death penalty had been reinstated in 1976). As Governor, he oversaw the first four executions carried out by the state of Arkansas since the death penalty was reinstated there in 1976: one by electric chair and three by lethal injection. To draw attention to his stance on capital punishment, Clinton flew home to Arkansas mid-campaign in 1992 in order to affirm in person that the controversial execution of Ricky Ray Rector would proceed as scheduled.

Clinton commuted significantly fewer sentences during his second governorship than he had in his first. By January 1992, he had only commuted seven sentences.

=== Racial and gender equity ===
Clinton supported affirmative action as governor.

In a state with a troubled history racial relations, Clinton appointed more black people to significant state offices than any governor in the state's history. He appointed more African American individuals to state agencies, boards, and commissions than had been appointed by all of his gubernatorial predecessors combined. In addition to his work to bring Black representation to the state's government, Clinton also similarly appointed many women.

Clinton attracted strong criticism when he obstructed an effort by a number of black leaders to investigate allegations that officials from the state's economic development agency had provided a Japanese company data related to the racial demographics of towns that were being considered for a new factory by the town. Clinton's excuse for protecting this matter from inquiry was that he believed it would compromise the state's economic development work if they disclosed what information the state provided to companies.

Clinton received criticism from some in the state's black community for what they saw as a failure to provide sufficient state assistance to minority owned businesses. Nevertheless, he received strong support from African-American voters in each of his gubernatorial elections.

=== Welfare reform ===
Clinton advanced welfare reforms that sought to move recipients into the state's workforce.

Clinton's governorship had a state program that aimed to transitioning mothers on welfare off of welfare and into the state's workforce. The Manpower Demonstration Research Corporation concluded in 1991 that the program had seen small, but discernible, success. Clinton was also a major player in negotiations between state governors and the Reagan administration on welfare reform which led to the drafting of federal legislation that was passed in 1988.

=== Environment ===
Initially, Clinton was hesitant to strengthen state regulation regarding pollution, fearing that it might be to the determinant of his goals for business growth. Due to a lack of major polluting industry in the state, Arkansas was one of the least-polluted U.S. states. Additionally, the new industrial plants were constructed during Clinton's governorship were subject to federal environmental regulations, limiting their pollution.

Environmentalism began to gain more ground politically through the 1980s. In the 1990 gubernatorial election, environmental concerns became a significant election issue. In 1991, Clinton secured the passage of stronger pollution regulations in the state legislature. This marked the first time since his first term that he had passed major environment legislation.

As governor, Clinton gave new protection to hundreds of square miles of waterways and wilderness.

A prominent environmental controversy regarded runoff in the northwestern area of the state from chicken waste. For much of his governorship, Clinton did not address this issue. Clinton, notably, received financial backing in his campaigns from Don Tyson and his family, who ran Tyson Foods, a major chicken processing company. However, after national attention was given to the matter, Clinton created a task force to study the issue. Nevertheless, nearly all the individuals he appointed were connected to the chicken industry. In the spring of 1992, amid his presidential campaign, Clinton's gubernatorial administration made a proposal for mandatory regulations on the disposal of chicken waste.

The remediation of the shuttered Vertac Corporation plant outside Jacksonville, Arkansas was a prominent environmental cleanup dispute. The site contained waste containing dioxins. Clinton and the federal government both sought to dispose the waste through incineration, viewing it as the least dangerous way to dispose of dioxin. However, this faced local opposition. Activists in the area strongly were against this, as they believed an incinerator would pollute the area. The activists instead sought for the waste to be moved to a different location.

In his second term, unlike his first term, Clinton did not make any significant attempt to combat the state's timber industry. Nevertheless, he gave low key support to private efforts by environmentalists.

A study by the Institute for Southern Studies, late into Clinton's governorship, ranked Arkansas low among states in its assessment of its environment regulation and environmental problems.

=== Healthcare ===
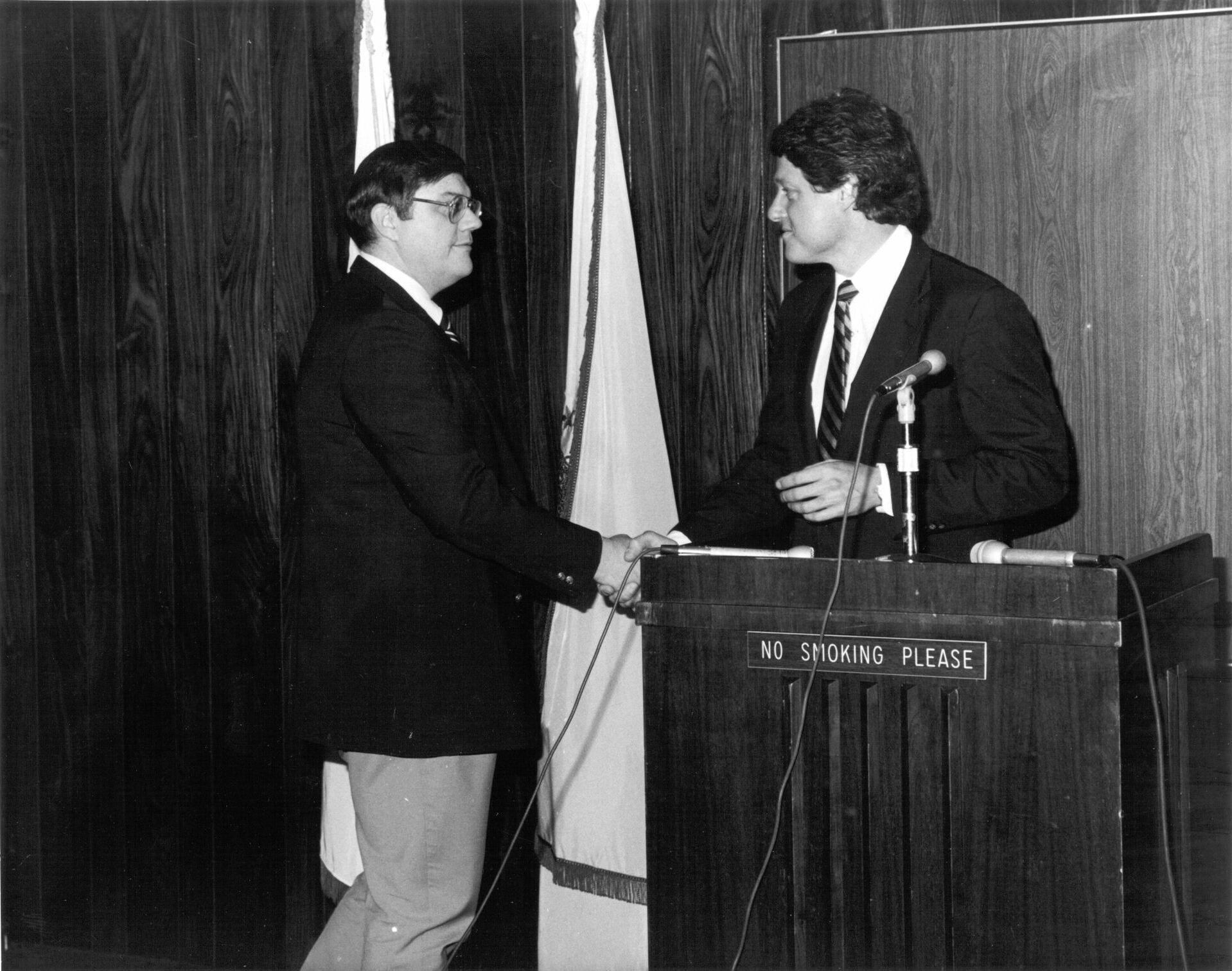
Clinton (right) shakes hands with Ron Hart, President of the National Center for Toxicological Research in 1983

Clinton earned praise for his efforts on enhancing healthcare in the state, particularly for residents in the more impoverished parts of the state. Arkansas had one of the lowest rates of health insurance coverage among U.S. states. In 1991, Clinton supported a successful effort by Arkansas legislators to pass into law what was advertised as a "bare bones" workers' insurance program.

Clinton earned strong commendations for his efforts as governor to enhance medical services for pregnant individuals and newborn children. Clinton was successful in seeking more state funding for clinics serving these individuals. Clinton also supported the State Health Department's program's program allow for local school districts to have school health clinics disseminate information on family planning. Clinton also supported the State Health Department's controversial distribution of condoms during clinics at high schools. Clinton created programs related to prenatal care and healthcare for poor youths. Arkansas' infant mortality rate declined. However, it did not change at a rank that significantly altered its ranking among U.S. states in infant mortalities. In the summer of 1992, Clinton's wife, Hillary, unveiled a program to further decrease the state's infant mortality rate by helping to provide prenatal checkups to pregnant individuals.

Towards the end of Clinton's governorship, however, Arkansas still was ranked the "45th worst" state for children in a study by the Center for the Study of Social Policy think tank.

=== Lobbying reforms ===
In 1987, after facing heavy attacks on his agenda by lobbyists, Clinton angrily declared he would combat lobbying. Clinton placed lobbying reform legislation on the ballot in the following statewide election, and the legislation was approved by Arkansas' electorate. Despite the passage of those reforms, lobbying persisted even more strongly against Clinton's agenda. Because of this, Clinton put further reforms on the following statewide election ballot, which were also approved by the state's voters.

=== Accusations of impropriety ===
After Clinton became president, allegations were made that Clinton had used Arkansas State Police troopers to help him arrange extramarital affairs during his governorship. This scandal became dubbed "Troopergate". Clinton's Republican opponent in his 1986 gubernatorial re-election campaign accused the Clintons of a conflict of interest because Hillary's employer, the Rose Law Firm, did state business. The Clintons countered these accusations by claiming that state fees were walled off by the firm before her profits were calculated. Clinton faced other allegations of improprieties occurring in his governorship.

=== National politics ===
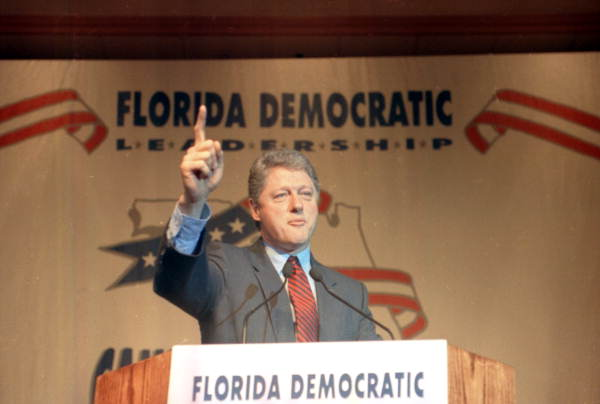
Clinton speaking at the 1991 Florida Democratic Convention

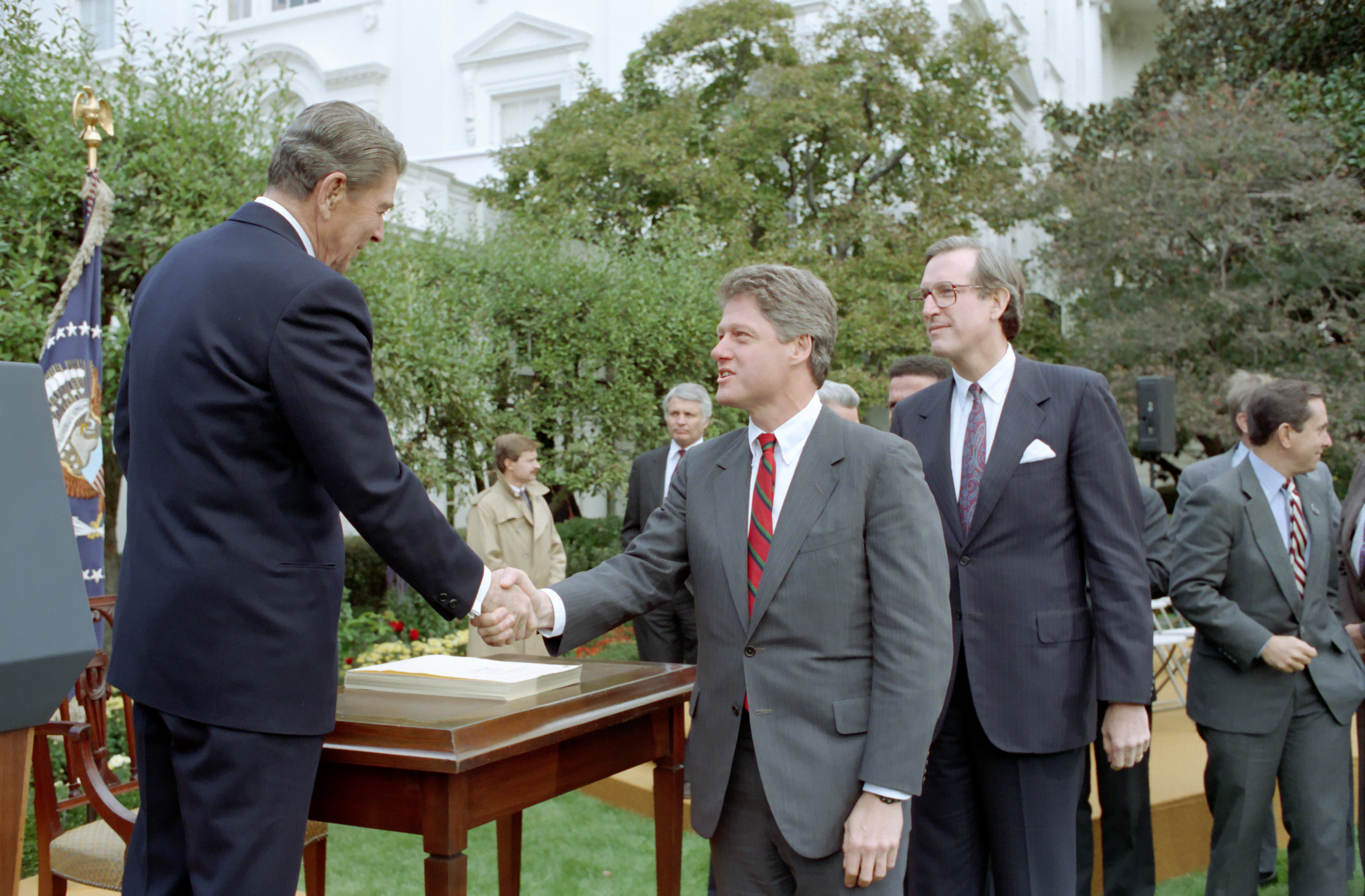
Clinton shakes President Ronald Reagan's hand in the White House Rose Garden in October 1988

Clinton became a leading figure among the New Democrats, a group of Democrats who advocated welfare reform, smaller government, and other policies not supported by liberals. Formally organized as the Democratic Leadership Council (DLC), the New Democrats argued that in light of President Ronald Reagan's landslide victory in 1984, the Democratic Party needed to adopt a more centrist political stance in order to succeed at the national level. Clinton delivered the Democratic response to Reagan's 1985 State of the Union Address and served as chair of the National Governors Association from 1986 to 1987, bringing him to an audience beyond Arkansas.

Clinton presented himself both as a moderate and as a member of the New Democrat wing of the Democratic Party, and he headed the moderate Democratic Leadership Council in 1990 and 1991.

==== Prospective 1988 presidential candidacy ====
In 1987, the media speculated that Clinton would enter the presidential race after incumbent New York governor Mario Cuomo declined to run and Democratic front-runner Gary Hart withdrew owing to revelations of multiple marital infidelities. Clinton decided to remain as Arkansas governor (following consideration for the potential candidacy of Hillary for governor, initially favored—but ultimately vetoed—by the First Lady). Clinton had gone as far as scheduling a presidential campaign announcement press event before changing his mind about running. He publicly cited the stresses that a campaign would impose on his family as his reason for not running. For the 1988 presidential nomination, Clinton endorsed Massachusetts governor Michael Dukakis. He gave the nationally televised opening night address at the 1988 Democratic National Convention, but his speech, which was 33 minutes long and twice the length it was expected to be, was criticized for being too long and poorly delivered. Afterwards, he appeared on The Tonight Show Starring Johnny Carson and made light of his bungled convention appearance, helping him to remediate some of the damage that had been done to his public image.

=== Election as president in 1992 ===
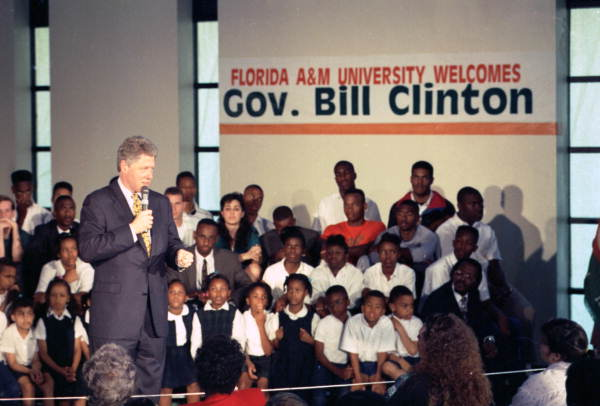
Clinton at a campaign rally at Florida A&M University in April 1992

During Clinton's 1990 re-election campaign, he promised to serve out the entirety of the term he was seeking. However, Clinton reneged and instead successfully ran for president in 1992, defeating Republican incumbent George H. W. Bush.

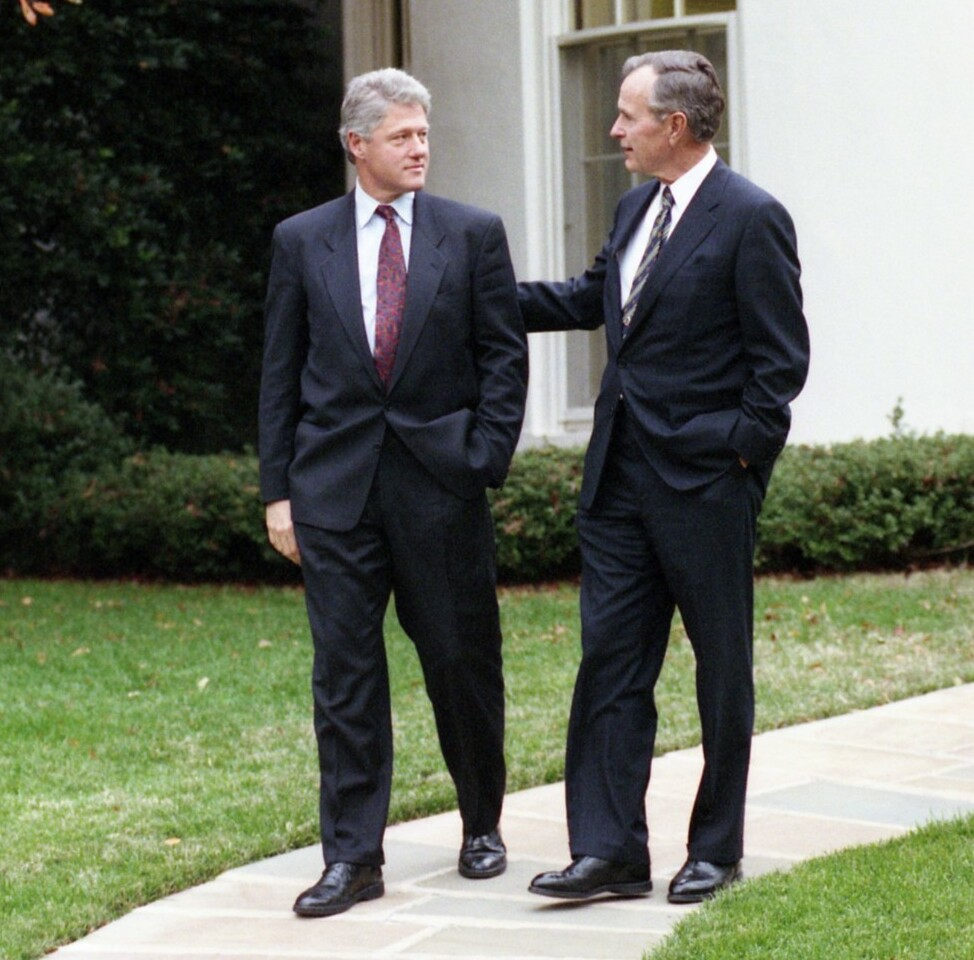
President-elect Clinton speaks with outgoing president George H. W. Bush at the White House on November 18, 1992

Clinton was the first sitting governor to transition into the presidency since Franklin D. Roosevelt did after his own election in 1932. During his presidential transition, Clinton resigned from the governorship on December 12, 1992.

== See also ==
- Hillary Clinton as First Lady of Arkansas
- Presidency of Bill Clinton
- List of longest-serving United States governors
