= Betsey Wright =

American political consultant

Chair of the Democratic Party of Arkansas
- In office 1990–1991

Chief of Staff to the Governor of Arkansas
- In office January 1983 – November 1989

Personal details
- Born: Betsey Ross Wright; July 4, 1943 (age 83) Alpine, Texas, U.S.
- Education: University of Texas at Austin
- Occupation: Lobbyist, political consultant, activist
- Known for: Chief of staff to Governor Bill Clinton (1982–1989); Campaign manager for Clinton's gubernatorial campaigns (1982, 1984, 1986); Chair of the Democratic Party of Arkansas (1990–1991); Deputy chair of Clinton's first presidential campaign (1992)

Betsey Ross Wright (born July 4, 1943) is an American lobbyist, activist, and political consultant who worked more than a decade for Bill Clinton in Arkansas. She served as chief of staff to Governor Clinton for seven years. As deputy chair of the 1992 Clinton presidential campaign, Wright established the rapid response system that was responsible for defending Clinton's record in Arkansas and promptly answering all personal attacks on the candidate. During the 1992 campaign, Wright coined the term "bimbo eruptions" to describe rumors alleging extramarital affairs by Clinton. In the 1990s, Wright was an executive for the Wexler Group, a lobbying firm in Washington, D.C. She currently resides in Rogers, Arkansas.

== Early life ==
Wright was born July 4, 1943, in Alpine, Texas. She attended Alpine High School and received her higher education at the University of Texas at Austin, graduating with a Bachelor of Arts. Wright served as President of the Texas Young Democrats from 1968-1969.

== Career ==
Wright worked for George McGovern's unsuccessful 1972 presidential campaign. It was during this campaign when she met Bill Clinton and Hillary Rodham. Wright became close friends with Rodham, a woman she thought had the potential to become a U.S. senator or America's first female president. In 1973, Wright moved to Washington, D.C. and began working for the National Women's Political Caucus, hoping the job would further Rodham's political viability. During Clinton's unsuccessful run for the House of Representatives in 1974, Wright commuted on the weekends to Arkansas to assist his campaign.

During the late 1970s, Wright founded and served as executive director of the now-defunct National Women's Education Fund, an organization based in Washington, D.C., which raised funds for women candidates. While there, she designed, organized and conducted training programs throughout the country for women candidates, campaign managers, and officeholders. in 1977, Wright became an associate of the Women's Institute for Freedom of the Press (WIFP).

In 1980, ten days after his defeat for re-election as governor of Arkansas, Bill Clinton asked Wright to come to Little Rock and help organize the campaign's records and files. Bringing only her suitcase, Wright traveled to Little Rock and began formulating Clinton's political comeback. She organized and ran Clinton's successful 1982 gubernatorial campaign, as well as his re-election campaigns in 1984 and 1986. The New York Times credited Wright as being "an architect of [Clinton's] rise to power in Arkansas." In 1982, Wright was appointed as chief of staff to Governor Clinton. Her duties included managing public support for Clinton's controversial education reforms. Wright resigned from her position in 1989, citing exhaustion.

In 1990, Wright was elected chair of the Democratic Party of Arkansas and was hired as its executive director. While serving as a fellow at Harvard University's Kennedy School of Government in 1992, Wright led a seminar entitled "High Tech Politics". She resigned to return to Arkansas and assist Clinton during his run for the presidency. Wright served as deputy chair of the Clinton campaign during the 1992 election, but did not work for the Clinton administration.

On the eve of the 1992 election, Anne Wexler offered Wright a position as executive vice president of the Wexler Group, a lobbying firm whose parent company is the WPP Group. As a lobbyist, Wright's clients included American Airlines, the American Dietetic Association, the American Forest & Paper Association, and ARCO, among others.

=== Advocacy ===
Wright is a supporter of the feminist movement, a prisoners' rights advocate, and strongly opposes capital punishment. She often visits inmates on Arkansas' death row at the Varner Unit, a high-security prison located near Grady.

While visiting a death row inmate in 2005, Wright was accused of trying to smuggle money into the prison. After the incident, Wright lost visitation privileges for six months. In August 2009, the Arkansas State's Attorney's office filed 51 felony charges against Wright, accusing her of attempting to smuggle a knife, tweezers, a boxcutter, and 48 tattoo needles into the Varner Unit on May 22. During an interview with the Associated Press, Wright denied any wrongdoing, saying that the needles were in a bag of chips that she got from a prison vending machine. In April 2010, Wright agreed in a plea bargain to plead no contest to two misdemeanors; in exchange, 48 felony counts were dropped. She was sentenced to one year of probation and a $2000 fine.

== Film ==
Wright appeared in the 1993 documentary film The War Room, a behind the scenes look at Clinton's 1992 presidential campaign. Wright also appeared in the 2004 documentary The Hunting of the President: The Ten-Year Campaign to Destroy Bill Clinton, a film adaption of the book written by Joe Conason and Gene Lyons, and the 2012 American Experience documentary Clinton.

=== Cultural depictions ===
The character of Libby Holden in Joe Klein's 1996 novel Primary Colors is loosely based on Wright. In the 1998 film adaptation, Holden's character was portrayed by Kathy Bates, a role which earned Bates an Academy Award nomination for Best Supporting Actress.
