= 1980 United States presidential election in Arkansas =

- November 4, 1980

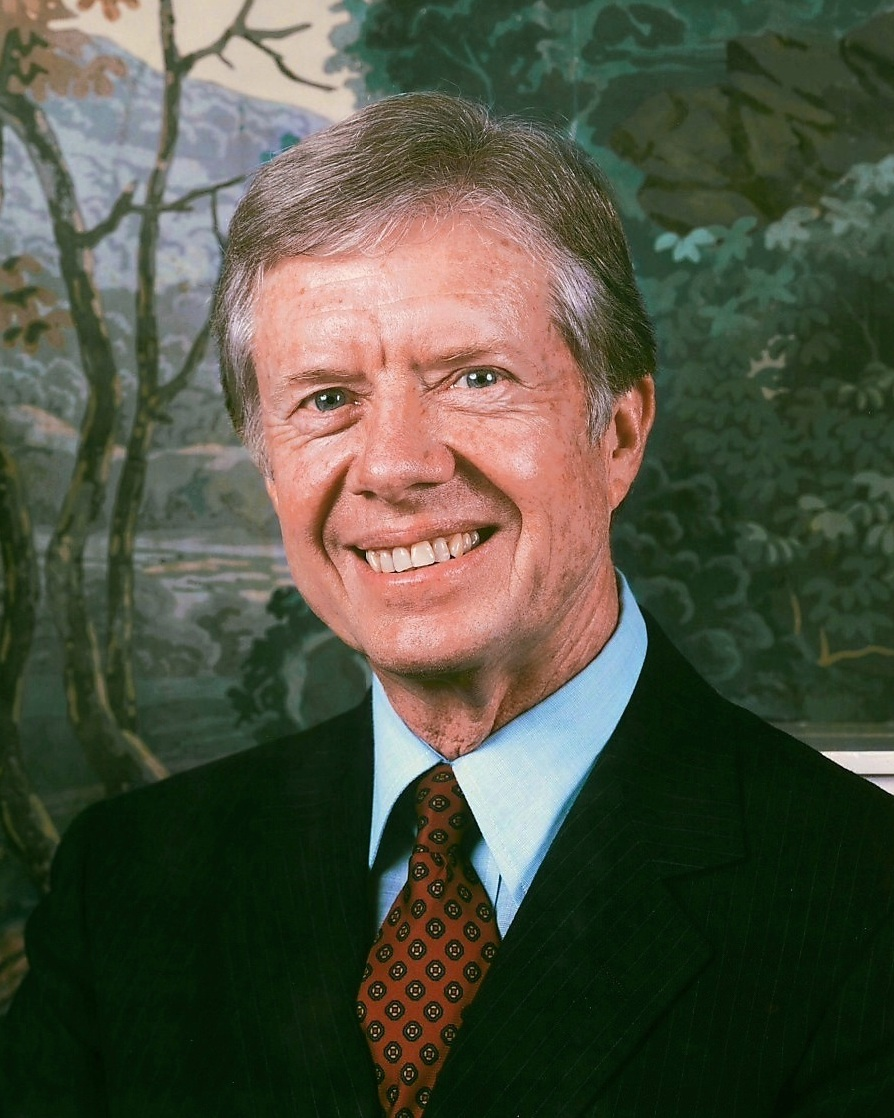
Nominee	Ronald Reagan	Jimmy Carter
Party	Republican	Democratic
Home state	California	Georgia
Running mate	George H. W. Bush	Walter Mondale
Electoral vote	6	0
Popular vote	403,164	398,041
Percentage	48.13%	47.52%
County results
Reagan
40–50%
50–60%
60–70%
Carter
40–50%
50–60%
60–70%
President before election
Jimmy Carter
Democratic
Elected President
Ronald Reagan
Republican

The 1980 United States presidential election in Arkansas took place on November 4, 1980. All fifty states and The District of Columbia were part of the 1980 United States presidential election. State voters chose six electors to the Electoral College, who voted for president and vice president.

The election was very close in Arkansas, with the state being won by former California Governor Ronald Reagan by only 0.6 points.

Despite incumbent Jimmy Carter having won the state four years earlier by 30 percent, Carter's perceived failures in office, including economic downturn in an election year, the Iran hostage crisis, and a riot by Cuban refugees who were temporarily placed in Fort Chaffee in western Arkansas, contributed to his defeat. While insignificant in the overall context of Reagan winning the Electoral College by a significant amount, some analysts have said the combined Democratic ticket in Arkansas in both the presidential and gubernatorial races would have won, if the riot had not occurred.

This is also the last time any candidate won Arkansas with only a plurality; in 1992, it was the only state in the nation besides the District of Columbia to give native son Bill Clinton a majority of the vote. This is the closest election in the state's history. This was the first time since 1868 that the state backed a non-incumbent Republican.

Among white voters, 53% supported Reagan while 42% supported Carter.

== Results ==
Electoral results
Presidential candidate	Party	Home state	Popular vote		Electoral vote	Running mate		
Presidential candidate	Party	Home state	Count	Percentage	Electoral vote	Vice-presidential candidate	Home state	Electoral vote
Ronald Reagan	Republican	California	403,164	48.13%	6	George H. W. Bush	Texas	6
Jimmy Carter (incumbent)	Democrat	Georgia	398,041	47.52%	0	Walter Mondale (incumbent)	Minnesota	0
John B. Anderson	Anderson Coalition (Note: Anderson’s party was listed on this state’s ballot as “Anderson Coalition”.)	Illinois	22,468	2.68%	0	Patrick Lucey	Wisconsin	0
Ed Clark	Libertarian	California	8,970	1.07%	0	David Koch	New York	0
Barry Commoner	Citizens	New York	2,345	0.28%	0	LaDonna Harris	Oklahoma	0
Benjamin Bubar	Prohibition	Maine	1,350	0.16%	0	Earl Dodge	Colorado	0
Gus Hall	People Before Profits	New York	1,244	0.15%	0	Angela Davis	California	0
Total			837,582	100%	6			6
Needed to win					270			270

=== Results by county ===
County	Ronald Reagan Republican		Jimmy Carter Democratic		John B. Anderson Anderson Coalition		Ed Clark Libertarian		Various candidates Other parties		Margin		Total votes cast
County	#	%	#	%	#	%	#	%	#	%	#	%	Total votes cast
Arkansas	3,409	42.69%	4,303	53.89%	193	2.42%	16	0.20%	64	0.80%	-894	-11.20%	7,985
Ashley	3,960	45.27%	4,552	52.03%	130	1.49%	45	0.51%	61	0.70%	-592	-6.76%	8,748
Baxter	9,684	63.93%	4,789	31.62%	494	3.26%	132	0.87%	48	0.32%	4,895	32.31%	15,147
Benton	18,830	63.96%	9,231	31.36%	1,018	3.46%	303	1.03%	58	0.20%	9,599	32.60%	29,440
Boone	6,778	56.07%	4,576	37.86%	429	3.55%	159	1.32%	146	1.21%	2,202	18.21%	12,088
Bradley	1,650	33.74%	3,139	64.19%	66	1.35%	24	0.49%	11	0.22%	-1,489	-30.45%	4,890
Calhoun	896	37.40%	1,438	60.02%	52	2.17%	9	0.38%	1	0.04%	-542	-22.62%	2,396
Carroll	4,273	55.29%	2,977	38.52%	298	3.86%	135	1.75%	45	0.58%	1,296	16.77%	7,728
Chicot	2,239	38.76%	3,445	59.64%	26	0.45%	64	1.11%	2	0.03%	-1,206	-20.88%	5,776
Clark	2,743	29.97%	6,122	66.89%	215	2.35%	59	0.64%	14	0.15%	-3,379	-36.92%	9,153
Clay	3,091	42.17%	3,985	54.37%	121	1.65%	126	1.72%	7	0.10%	-894	-12.20%	7,330
Cleburne	4,042	48.38%	4,021	48.13%	204	2.44%	82	0.98%	6	0.07%	21	0.25%	8,355
Cleveland	1,124	36.76%	1,856	60.69%	36	1.18%	33	1.08%	9	0.29%	-732	-23.93%	3,058
Columbia	5,259	52.76%	4,445	44.60%	107	1.07%	131	1.31%	25	0.25%	814	8.16%	9,967
Conway	4,145	45.11%	4,698	51.13%	232	2.52%	102	1.11%	12	0.13%	-553	-6.02%	9,189
Craighead	11,010	51.31%	9,231	43.02%	708	3.30%	283	1.32%	224	1.04%	1,779	8.29%	21,456
Crawford	8,542	66.22%	3,948	30.61%	245	1.90%	131	1.02%	33	0.26%	4,594	35.61%	12,899
Crittenden	6,248	45.20%	7,022	50.80%	185	1.34%	224	1.62%	144	1.04%	-774	-5.60%	13,823
Cross	2,895	44.59%	3,471	53.47%	89	1.37%	35	0.54%	2	0.03%	-576	-8.88%	6,492
Dallas	1,596	35.16%	2,838	62.52%	74	1.63%	25	0.55%	6	0.13%	-1,242	-27.36%	4,539
Desha	2,057	34.07%	3,748	62.08%	77	1.28%	47	0.78%	108	1.79%	-1,691	-28.01%	6,037
Drew	2,272	36.74%	3,757	60.75%	117	1.89%	32	0.52%	6	0.10%	-1,485	-24.01%	6,184
Faulkner	7,544	44.19%	8,528	49.95%	769	4.50%	181	1.06%	51	0.30%	-984	-5.76%	17,073
Franklin	3,448	53.66%	2,716	42.27%	197	3.07%	61	0.95%	4	0.06%	732	11.39%	6,426
Fulton	2,101	49.35%	2,037	47.85%	83	1.95%	30	0.70%	6	0.14%	64	1.50%	4,257
Garland	15,739	52.96%	12,515	42.11%	1,042	3.51%	250	0.84%	171	0.58%	3,224	10.85%	29,717
Grant	2,007	38.04%	3,078	58.34%	102	1.93%	55	1.04%	34	0.64%	-1,071	-20.30%	5,276
Greene	4,514	41.64%	5,996	55.31%	219	2.02%	106	0.98%	6	0.06%	-1,482	-13.67%	10,841
Hempstead	3,852	44.65%	4,671	54.14%	72	0.83%	31	0.36%	2	0.02%	-819	-9.49%	8,628
Hot Spring	3,561	32.92%	6,897	63.76%	244	2.26%	87	0.80%	28	0.26%	-3,336	-30.84%	10,817
Howard	2,386	47.12%	2,564	50.63%	63	1.24%	28	0.55%	23	0.45%	-178	-3.51%	5,064
Independence	5,076	45.63%	5,683	51.08%	276	2.48%	69	0.62%	21	0.19%	-607	-5.45%	11,125
Izard	2,266	43.13%	2,750	52.34%	160	3.05%	54	1.03%	24	0.46%	-484	-9.21%	5,254
Jackson	3,191	39.49%	4,651	57.55%	174	2.15%	51	0.63%	14	0.17%	-1,460	-18.06%	8,081
Jefferson	10,697	35.60%	17,292	57.55%	802	2.67%	625	2.08%	630	2.10%	-6,595	-21.95%	30,046
Johnson	3,619	47.39%	3,709	48.57%	187	2.45%	93	1.22%	28	0.37%	-90	-1.18%	7,636
Lafayette	1,756	46.50%	1,947	51.56%	47	1.24%	21	0.56%	5	0.13%	-191	-5.06%	3,776
Lawrence	3,245	46.60%	3,547	50.94%	117	1.68%	51	0.73%	3	0.04%	-302	-4.34%	6,963
Lee	1,711	35.09%	3,103	63.64%	47	0.96%	12	0.25%	3	0.06%	-1,392	-28.55%	4,876
Lincoln	1,243	32.29%	2,517	65.39%	56	1.45%	30	0.78%	3	0.08%	-1,274	-33.10%	3,849
Little River	2,272	45.22%	2,631	52.37%	41	0.82%	43	0.86%	37	0.74%	-359	-7.15%	5,024
Logan	4,511	50.61%	4,098	45.98%	166	1.86%	117	1.31%	21	0.24%	413	4.63%	8,913
Lonoke	5,619	48.50%	5,605	48.38%	246	2.12%	84	0.73%	31	0.27%	14	0.12%	11,585
Madison	3,180	54.50%	2,434	41.71%	126	2.16%	75	1.29%	20	0.34%	746	12.79%	5,835
Marion	3,059	57.11%	2,046	38.20%	160	2.99%	84	1.57%	7	0.13%	1,013	18.91%	5,356
Miller	6,770	52.40%	5,996	46.41%	105	0.81%	40	0.31%	10	0.08%	774	5.99%	12,921
Mississippi	7,170	43.67%	8,908	54.26%	234	1.43%	88	0.54%	17	0.10%	-1,738	-10.59%	16,417
Monroe	2,027	41.98%	2,686	55.62%	82	1.70%	28	0.58%	6	0.12%	-659	-13.64%	4,829
Montgomery	1,585	43.88%	1,878	51.99%	86	2.38%	38	1.05%	25	0.69%	-293	-8.11%	3,612
Nevada	1,697	38.22%	2,631	59.26%	50	1.13%	46	1.04%	16	0.36%	-934	-21.04%	4,440
Newton	2,423	60.08%	1,436	35.61%	100	2.48%	57	1.41%	17	0.42%	987	24.47%	4,033
Ouachita	4,329	35.46%	7,152	58.58%	248	2.03%	110	0.90%	369	3.02%	-2,823	-23.12%	12,208
Perry	1,459	45.79%	1,606	50.41%	73	2.29%	43	1.35%	5	0.16%	-147	-4.62%	3,186
Phillips	4,270	38.31%	6,642	59.59%	163	1.46%	44	0.39%	27	0.24%	-2,372	-21.28%	11,146
Pike	1,916	46.77%	2,094	51.11%	58	1.42%	23	0.56%	6	0.15%	-178	-4.34%	4,097
Poinsett	4,040	44.01%	4,894	53.31%	153	1.67%	83	0.90%	10	0.11%	-854	-9.30%	9,180
Polk	3,993	58.51%	2,617	38.35%	139	2.04%	69	1.01%	6	0.09%	1,376	20.16%	6,824
Pope	7,217	50.72%	6,364	44.72%	471	3.31%	153	1.08%	25	0.18%	853	6.00%	14,230
Prairie	1,855	47.63%	1,928	49.50%	64	1.64%	35	0.90%	13	0.33%	-73	-1.87%	3,895
Pulaski	52,125	46.15%	54,839	48.56%	4,657	4.12%	1,003	0.89%	313	0.28%	-2,714	-2.41%	112,937
Randolph	2,579	43.50%	3,070	51.78%	125	2.11%	144	2.43%	11	0.19%	-491	-8.28%	5,929
St. Francis	4,485	42.77%	5,816	55.46%	132	1.26%	51	0.49%	3	0.03%	-1,331	-12.69%	10,487
Saline	8,330	42.60%	10,368	53.02%	643	3.29%	191	0.98%	23	0.12%	-2,038	-10.42%	19,555
Scott	2,228	48.16%	2,236	48.34%	92	1.99%	60	1.30%	10	0.22%	-8	-0.18%	4,626
Searcy	2,459	58.79%	1,536	36.72%	101	2.41%	70	1.67%	17	0.41%	923	22.07%	4,183
Sebastian	23,403	63.46%	10,141	27.50%	1,023	2.77%	902	2.45%	1,410	3.82%	13,262	35.96%	36,879
Sevier	2,502	45.52%	2,854	51.92%	97	1.76%	39	0.71%	5	0.09%	-352	-6.40%	5,497
Sharp	3,420	53.30%	2,774	43.24%	160	2.49%	56	0.87%	6	0.09%	646	10.06%	6,416
Stone	1,793	45.11%	1,968	49.51%	133	3.35%	66	1.66%	15	0.38%	-175	-4.40%	3,975
Union	9,401	55.10%	6,852	40.16%	313	1.83%	337	1.98%	160	0.94%	2,549	14.94%	17,063
Van Buren	3,090	49.11%	2,968	47.17%	153	2.43%	67	1.06%	14	0.22%	122	1.94%	6,292
Washington	20,788	58.69%	12,276	34.66%	1,737	4.90%	485	1.37%	135	0.38%	8,512	24.03%	35,421
White	8,079	46.66%	8,750	50.54%	309	1.78%	125	0.72%	50	0.29%	-671	-3.88%	17,313
Woodruff	1,204	32.06%	2,452	65.28%	74	1.97%	21	0.56%	5	0.13%	-1,248	-33.22%	3,756
Yell	3,187	44.65%	3,702	51.87%	181	2.54%	61	0.85%	6	0.08%	-515	-7.22%	7,137
Totals	403,164	48.13%	398,041	47.52%	22,468	2.68%	8,970	1.07%	4,939	0.59%	5,123	0.61%	837,582

==== Counties that flipped from Democratic to Republican ====
- Boone
- Carroll
- Cleburne
- Columbia
- Craighead
- Crawford
- Franklin
- Garland
- Fulton
- Logan
- Lonoke
- Madison
- Marion
- Miller
- Newton
- Polk
- Pope
- Searcy
- Sharp
- Union
- Van Buren
- Washington

=== Results by congressional district ===
District	Reagan	Carter	Representative
1st	45.0%	53.0%	Bill Alexander
2nd	46.3%	50.1%	Ed Bethune
3rd	58.8%	37.9%	John Paul Hammerschmidt
4th	42.1%	56.2%	Beryl Anthony Jr.

== See also ==
- United States presidential elections in Arkansas
- Presidency of Ronald Reagan

== Works cited ==
- Black, Earl; Black, Merle (1992). The Vital South: How Presidents Are Elected. Harvard University Press. ISBN 0674941306.
