= Frank D. White =

Governor of Arkansas from 1981 to 1983

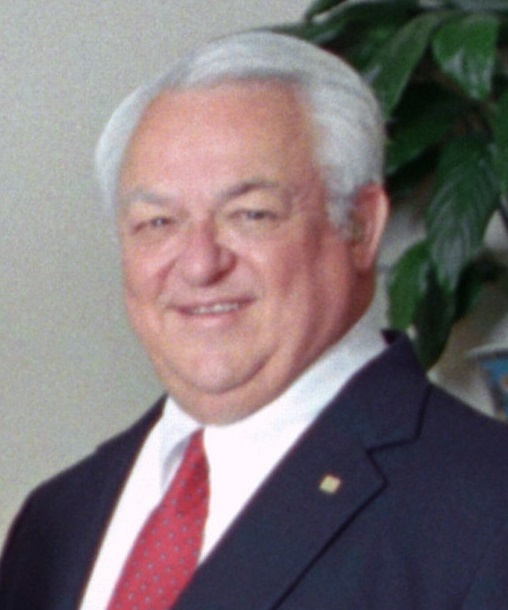
- White in 1995

41st Governor of Arkansas
- In office January 19, 1981 – January 11, 1983
- Lieutenant: Winston Bryant
- Preceded by: Bill Clinton
- Succeeded by: Bill Clinton

Arkansas Banking Commissioner
- In office November 1998 – July 2003
- Governor: Mike Huckabee

Personal details
- Born: Durward Frank Kyle Jr. June 4, 1933 Texarkana, Texas, U.S.
- Died: May 21, 2003 (aged 69) Little Rock, Arkansas, U.S.
- Resting place: Mount Holly Cemetery, Little Rock, Arkansas, U.S. 34°44′15.3″N 92°16′42.5″W
- Party: Democratic (before 1980); Republican (after 1980)
- Spouse(s): Mary Blue Hollenberg (m. 1961; div. 1973) Gay Daniels (m. 1975)
- Children: 3
- Education: United States Naval Academy (BS)
- Profession: Banker, stockbroker

Military service
- Allegiance: United States
- Branch/service: United States Air Force
- Years of service: 1956–1961
- Rank: Captain

Frank Durward White (born Durward Frank Kyle Jr.; June 4, 1933 – May 21, 2003) was an American banker and politician who served as the 41st governor of Arkansas. He served a single two-year term from 1981 to 1983.

== Early years, family, and education ==
White was born on June 4, 1933, in Texarkana in Bowie County, Texas, as Durward Frank Kyle Jr. His father, Durward Frank Kyle, died when White was seven, and White's mother, the former Ida Bottoms Clark, married Loftin E. White of Highland Park, Texas. He took his stepfather's name and became "Frank Durward White". After the death of the stepfather in 1950, the Whites returned to Texarkana. White enrolled in the New Mexico Military Institute and was subsequently appointed to the U.S. Naval Academy in Annapolis, Maryland. He graduated from the academy in 1956 with a degree in engineering. White served as a pilot in the United States Air Force. In 1957, as "one of his first missions", he flew members of the 101st Airborne Division to Little Rock due to the Little Rock Integration Crisis. White was discharged from the Air Force in 1961 with the rank of Captain.

White's first marriage was to Mary Blue Hollenberg, a member of a prominent Little Rock family; they had three children before divorcing in 1973. In 1975, White married Gay Daniels, "a devout Christian". They had no children, but gained custody of the children from White's first marriage.

As a youth, White was baptized at Beech Street First Baptist Church, which Mike Huckabee would later pastor, in Texarkana, Arkansas. He attended the First United Methodist Church in downtown Little Rock, but in 1977, he and some other couples, dissatisfied with the church's liberal theology, left it and instead started the fundamentalist Fellowship Bible Church.

== Business career ==
After being discharged from the Air Force in 1961, White worked at Merrill Lynch in Little Rock before joining Commercial National Bank in 1973. White served as the first director of the Little Rock Port Authority from 1972 to 1973.

In 1975, Arkansas Governor David Pryor appointed White as the director of the Arkansas Industrial Development Commission (AIDC). In 1977, White left the AIDC, afterward serving as the president of Capital Savings and Loan Co.

== Governor of Arkansas ==
=== 1980 campaign ===
Early in 1980, White switched from Democratic to Republican affiliation to run for governor. First, he defeated former State Representative Marshall Chrisman, a businessman from Ozark in Franklin County, for the gubernatorial nomination. In a low-turnout open primary, White polled 5,867 votes (71.8%) to Chrisman's 2,310 (28.2%). Incumbent Bill Clinton also faced a stronger-than-expected challenger in his primary from Monroe Schwarzlose, a turkey farmer from Kingsland in Cleveland County in south Arkansas. Schwarzlose's 31 percent of the primary vote foreshadowed that Clinton could be in trouble for the upcoming general election. Despite this, it was widely expected that Clinton would win the election.

White hired Paula Unruh of Tulsa to manage the campaign. She decided to focus upon (1) Clinton's unpopular increase in the cost of automobile registration tags and by (2) the Carter administration's sending thousands of Cuban refugees, some unruly, to a detention camp at Fort Chaffee, outside Fort Smith in Sebastian County in western Arkansas. Her decision paid big dividends, as White won with 435,684 votes (51.9%) to Clinton's 403,242 (48.1%). White won fifty-one of the state's seventy-five counties. A. Lynn Lowe of Texarkana, Clinton's Republican opponent in 1978, by contrast, had won only six counties.

White was the second Republican ever elected governor in Arkansas since Reconstruction.

=== Tenure ===
White signed a law that required the teaching of creationism in Arkansas public schools, along with the theory of evolution. The law was subsequently overturned in 1982 in the court case McLean v. Arkansas. White also created controversy within his own party in 1981, when he appointed Orval Faubus, a former Democratic governor, to head the Arkansas Department of Veterans Affairs.

=== 1982 and 1986 campaigns ===
White was unable to secure a hold on the governorship. Chrisman and a third candidate, nutritionist Connie Voll of Lonoke, challenged him in the 1982 primary. Voll was the first woman to seek the GOP nomination for governor and the second to seek the party nomination for a statewide office since Leona Troxell. Clinton then defeated him in a rematch of the 1980 contest during the general election: 431,855 (54.7%) to 357,496 (45.3%). White won only nineteen counties in the 1982 rematch, which occurred in a nationally Democratic year when the nation was in a recession.

In 1986, White again challenged Clinton for the governorship but lost.

== Later career and death ==
After his 1986 defeat, White returned to First Commercial Bank in Little Rock as senior vice president until his retirement from the bank in 1998. White declined to seek the Republican nomination for governor again in 1990 and instead supported Sheffield Nelson in his primary race against U.S. Representative Tommy F. Robinson. That year, Clinton won election as governor for the fifth time; two years later he would be elected President of the United States. Without sufficient support and resources to run for elected office again, White left elective politics but remained active in Republican affairs.

From 1998 to 2003, White served as Arkansas Banking Commissioner, an appointment from Governor Mike Huckabee. He remained in the post until shortly before his death from a heart attack in 2003, at age 69. White's time in the Banking Department was noted by his practice of visiting all of Arkansas' state-chartered banks at least once a year.

White is interred at the historic Mount Holly Cemetery in Little Rock.

The Arkansas Republican Party began awarding the "Hi, I'm Frank White" award in 2006. This award is considered to be the highest honor given out by the Arkansas GOP.

== See also ==
- List of governors of Arkansas

Political offices
Preceded by Bill Clinton	Governor of Arkansas; 1981–1983	Succeeded by Bill Clinton
Party political offices
Preceded by Lynn Lowe	Republican nominee for Governor of Arkansas; 1980, 1982	Succeeded by Woody Freeman
Preceded by Woody Freeman	Republican nominee for Governor of Arkansas; 1986	Succeeded by Sheffield Nelson
