= 1982 Arkansas gubernatorial election =

- November 2, 1982
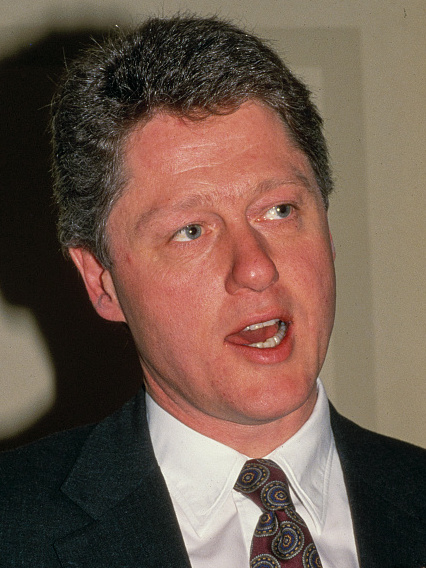

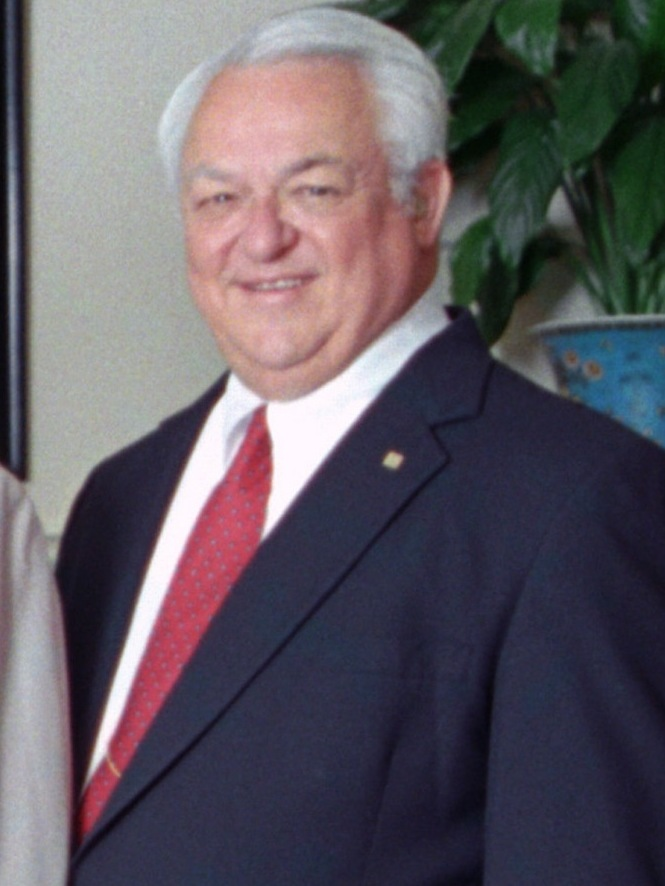
Nominee	Bill Clinton	Frank D. White
Party	Democratic	Republican
Popular vote	431,855	357,496
Percentage	54.71%	45.29%
- County results Clinton: 50–60% 60–70% 70–80% White: 50–60% 60–70%
Governor before election
Frank D. White
Republican
Elected Governor
Bill Clinton
Democratic

The 1982 Arkansas gubernatorial election was held on November 2, 1982, to elect the governor of Arkansas. Former Democratic governor Bill Clinton regained the position after having narrowly been defeated by Republican candidate Frank D. White at the previous election. Clinton held the position from January 1983 until he resigned after being elected president in 1992.

== Democratic primary ==
=== Candidates ===
==== Nominee ====
- Governor Bill Clinton, Governor of Arkansas (1979-1981)

==== Eliminated in primary ====
- Lieutenant Governor Joe Purcell, former acting governor of Arkansas, 1979, former lieutenant governor 1975-1981; former attorney general 1967-1971.
- Jim Guy Tucker, former congressman and attorney general
- Kim Hendren, state senator and automobile dealer
- Monroe Schwarzlose, retired turkey farmer and perennial candidate

=== Results ===
Democratic primary results
Party	Candidate	Votes	%
Democratic	Bill Clinton	236,961	41.8
Democratic	Joe Purcell	166,066	29.3
Democratic	Jim Guy Tucker	129,362	22.8
Total votes		566,974 (Note: The total number of votes is not provided and therefore estimated based on the missing percentage value of 6.1%.)	100.00

== Republican primary ==
=== Candidates ===
==== Nominee ====
- Frank D. White, incumbent governor

==== Eliminated in primary ====
- Marshall Chrisman, farmer and former state representative
- Connie Voll, nutritionist

=== Results ===
Republican primary results
Party	Candidate	Votes	%
Republican	Frank D. White (incumbent)	11,111	83.2
Republican	Marshall Chrisman	1,410	10.6
Republican	Connie Vol	826	6.2
Total votes		13,347	100.00

== Campaign ==
Clinton, one of the youngest ex-governors in the nation at the age of 36, was aiming to regain the governorship, having lost the 1980 Arkansas gubernatorial election. Frank White, who had won that election, easily won renomination from the Republican party.

White was hurt politically due to several unpopular decisions that he made, and Clinton ran an aggressive campaign.

== Result ==
Clinton won the election, and was elected again in 1984, 1986, and 1990. He resigned as governor following his presidential victory in November 1992.

Arkansas gubernatorial election, 1982
Party	Candidate	Votes	%	±%
Democratic	Bill Clinton	431,855	54.71%	+6.64%
Republican	Frank D. White (incumbent)	357,496	45.29%	−6.64%
Total votes		789,351	100.00%	N/A
Democratic gain from Republican				
