= Lynn Lowe =

American politician (1936–2010)

- Lowe in undated photograph

Chair of the Arkansas Republican Party
- In office December 1974 – June 1980
- Preceded by: Jim R. Caldwell
- Succeeded by: Jeraldine D. Pruden (interim); Harlan "Bo" Holleman

Republican National Committeeman from Arkansas
- In office June 1980 – 1988
- Preceded by: John Paul Hammerschmidt
- Succeeded by: Robert "Bob" Leslie

Personal details
- Born: Aylmer Lynn Lowe; March 6, 1936 Texarkana, Miller County; Arkansas, U.S.
- Died: August 14, 2010 (aged 74) Garland, Miller County, U.S.
- Resting place: Lowe farm in Miller County
- Party: Republican
- Spouse: Nedra Jean Bledsoe
- Children: Michael Lynn Lowe Evelyn Ruth Lowe Martha Elizabeth Lowe Robertson
- Parent(s): Luther and Ruth McKinley Lowe
- Education: Garland City (Arkansas) High School Southern Arkansas University University of Arkansas at Fayetteville
- Occupation: Farmer; Businessman
- For more than a quarter century, Lowe was a pioneer in the attempt to establish a two-party system in the historically Democratic state of Arkansas. Since his death, the state moved primarily into the Republican column.

Aylmer Lynn Lowe (March 6, 1936 – August 14, 2010) was an American businessman and politician who was a major figure in the Arkansas Republican Party. He was the Republican gubernatorial nominee in 1978 against the Democrat Bill Clinton, served as state party chairman from 1974 to 1980, and was the GOP candidate in Arkansas's 4th congressional district in 1966, having been defeated by the Democrat David Pryor, then a state representative and a future governor and U.S. Senator, originally from Camden in Ouachita County in south Arkansas.

== Personal life ==
Lowe was born in Texarkana to Jesse Luther Lowe, Sr. (1890–1967), and the former Ruth McKinley (1894–1987), originally from Waldo in Nevada County in southern Arkansas. He graduated from Garland High School and attended Southern Arkansas University in Magnolia for two years before he received in 1959 his Bachelor of Science degree in agricultural engineering from the University of Arkansas at Fayetteville. He farmed his entire life near the Red River and for a time also raised cattle.

== Gubernatorial bid ==
Lowe found few issues on which to challenge Clinton until the Democrat announced his opposition to a referendum to remove the state sales tax on groceries and prescription drugs. Clinton determined that the state could not afford to lose the $60 million then procured from the sales tax. Lowe noted a $40 million state surplus and urged repeal of the taxes. Clinton defeated Lowe, and the removal of the sales taxes failed.

With his election a foregone conclusion, Clinton called the campaign against Lowe "uneventful except for the press conference on the steps of the Capitol in which his campaign accused me of being a draft dodger." Lowe's charge would be raised again nearly fourteen years later in the 1992 presidential primary campaign. The Arkadelphia Southern Standard newspaper in Arkadelphia claimed that Clinton could hardly lose "unless he stumbles badly or is caught molesting a nun in the process of robbing the church widows’ and orphans’ funds."U.S. News & World Report said that no state in the U.S. South in 1978 was "tougher to crack for the Republicans than Arkansas, and it's going to stay that way." Clinton hence became at thirty-two the youngest person elected governor in the United States since Harold E. Stassen won in Minnesota in 1938 at the age of thirty-one. He was termed "a living monument to the god 'Charisma'"

Lowe received 195,550 votes (36.6 percent) and won six counties: Sebastian (Fort Smith, with 62.5 percent), Crawford (near Fort Smith with 55 percent), Boone (Harrison, with 54.9 percent), Polk (54.4 percent), Van Buren (54.1 percent), and his own Miller (53.6 percent). He won 49.8 percent in Franklin, also near Fort Smith and the home base of then U.S. Senator Dale L. Bumpers. Clinton prevailed with 338,684 votees (63.4 percent) and won the remaining sixty-nine counties. It was the best showing by a GOP nominee for governor since Winthrop Rockefeller's 1970 defeat. While Lowe lost to Clinton, Lowe's former congressional rival, outgoing Governor David Pryor, won all seventy-five counties in the U.S. Senate race over the Little Rock Moderate Republican William Thomas "Tom" Kelly Jr. (1942-2011).

U.S. Representative John Paul Hammerschmidt, the first Arkansas Republican congressman since Reconstruction, was instrumental in helping his friend Lowe to win in Boone County. Hammerschmidt had also been party chairman for a time before and again after his congressional service. He also preceded Lowe as the party's national committeeman. Lowe was a Hammerschmidt donor from 1982 to 1988. After stepping down as chairman, he also gave $1,000 to the Arkansas party organization.

== Party leader ==
Lowe was elected state party chairman in December 1974.

Lowe described Winthrop Rockefeller as "a very unusual guy with the best interest of Arkansas and its people at heart. If he made a mistake, it was not because he wanted to do so." Lowe said that his early years as chairman came at a time when the Arkansas GOP was "about as flat on our back as a party could be. By 1980, we had come from one state legislator to a governor, Frank D. White, and two members of the U.S. House", John Paul Hammerschmidt and Edwin R. Bethune.

On August 10, 1975, Lowe and then State Representative Carolyn Pollan of Fort Smith hosted U.S. President Ford, who attended a reception of some thirty Arkansas Republican leaders held at the Sheraton Inn in Fort Smith. Earlier in the day, Ford had toured Fort Chaffee, accompanied by Senator John L. McClellan and other Democratic members of the Arkansas congressional delegation. Ford's stops included the Vietnam Refugee Resettlement Center there.

Lowe was sergeant at arms at the 1980 Republican National Convention in Detroit. The Arkansas delegation included Ada Mills of Clarksville, who had received national attention for having been the only delegate in the country initially committed to former Governor John B. Connally Jr., for the presidential nomination that year. As state party chairman, Lowe had been technically neutral at the convention, but Lowe and the entire Arkansas delegation routinely voted to nominate Ronald W. Reagan, who would then tap George Herbert Walker Bush of Texas as his vice-presidential choice.

After his three terms as party chairman, Lowe served from 1980-1988 as the Arkansas Republican national committeeman.

In 2000, Lowe was a donor to Republican presidential candidate George W. Bush, successful in a close electoral vote over Clinton's vice president, Al Gore Jr.

Lowe was the board chairman of the Southwest Arkansas Electric Cooperative Commission in Texarkana.

Lowe died at the age of seventy-four at his home in Garland, Arkansas. A memorial service was held on August 21, 2010, at the First Lutheran Church of Texarkana, Texas, with the Reverend Berry Kolb officiating. Lowe was interred on his farm.

Lowe's death came one month after the passing of Leon Griffith, the 1976 GOP gubernatorial nominee, who was overwhelmed in that heavily Democratic year by Governor David H. Pryor, who had defeated Lowe for Congress in 1966.

Party political offices
Preceded by Leon Louis Griffith	Republican nominee for Governor of Arkansas; 1978	Succeeded by Frank D. White
Preceded by Jim R. Caldwell	Arkansas Republican Party State Chairman; 1974–1980	Succeeded by Harlan "Bo" Holleman
Preceded by John Paul Hammerschmidt	Arkansas Republican Party National Committeeman; 1980–1988	Succeeded by Robert "Bob" Leslie
