= 1986 Arkansas gubernatorial election =

- November 4, 1986
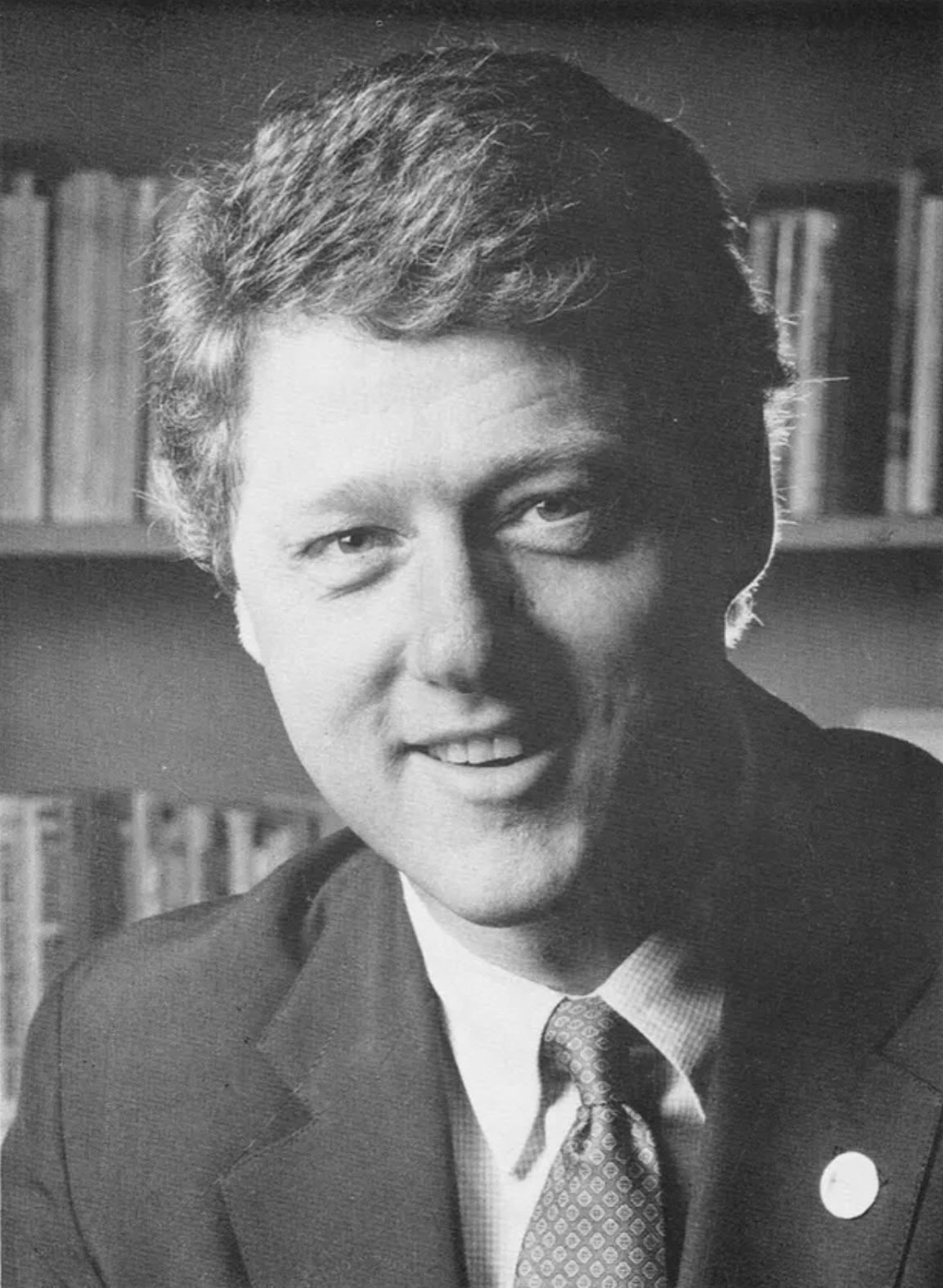

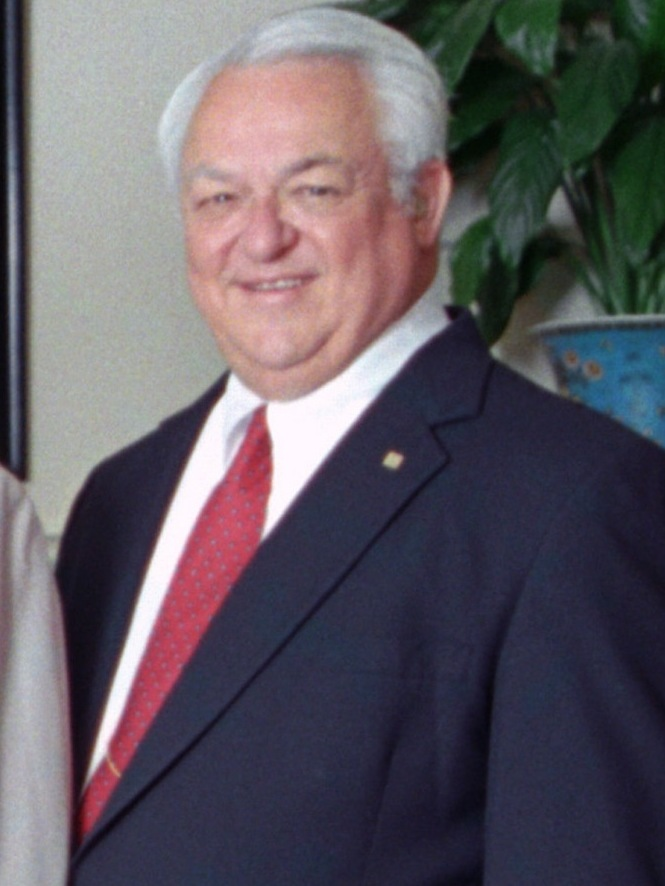
| Nominee | Bill Clinton | Frank D. White |
| Party | Democratic | Republican |
| Popular vote | 439,802 | 248,427 |
| Percentage | 63.90% | 36.10% |
- County results Clinton: 50–60% 60–70% 70–80% White: 50–60% 60–70%
Governor before election
Bill Clinton
Democratic
Elected Governor
Bill Clinton
Democratic

The 1986 Arkansas gubernatorial election was conducted on November 4, 1986, to elect the Governor of Arkansas.

Incumbent Democratic Governor Bill Clinton stood for re-election. He had been elected in 1982 and re-elected in 1984, and sought a third consecutive term and fourth overall (Clinton had been first elected in 1978). His opponent was former Republican Governor Frank D. White, who was seeking to return to the office he had defeated Clinton for in the 1980 election.

Clinton had defeated former Governor Orval Faubus for the Democratic nomination, while White defeated former Lieutenant Governor Maurice Britt in the Republican primary.

== Background ==
This was the first gubernatorial election following the enactment of a constitutional amendment in 1984, that increased the office's term from two years to four years.

== Democratic primary ==
Clinton won the Democratic primary with 60.58% of the vote against Orval Faubus with 33.5% and W. Dean Goldsby with 5.92%.

Democratic Primary
| Candidate | Votes | % |
|---|---|---|
| Bill Clinton (incumbent) | 315,397 | 60.58% |
| Orval Faubus | 174,402 | 33.50% |
| W. Dean Goldsby | 30,829 | 5.92% |
| Total votes | 520,628 | 100% |

=== Results by County ===
Democratic Primary Results: Bill Clinton: 40%-50%; 50%-60%; 60%-70%; 70%-80%; Orval Faubus: 40%-50%; 50%-60%; 70%-80%; No Results

Democratic Primary
| County | Clinton | Faubus | Goldsby | Margin |
|---|---|---|---|---|
| Arkansas | 62.78% | 32.75% | 4.48% | 30.03% |
| Ashley | 60.74% | 34.34% | 4.92% | 26.40% |
| Baxter | 67.69% | 26.81% | 5.50% | 40.88% |
| Benton | 75.39% | 19.78% | 4.83% | 55.61% |
| Boone | 44.17% | 51.40% | 4.43% | 7.23% |
| Bradley | 61.20% | 34.77% | 4.03% | 26.43% |
| Calhoun | 55.29% | 38.91% | 5.80% | 16.38% |
| Carroll | 47.15% | 48.45% | 4.40% | 1.30% |
| Chicot | 76.06% | 18.67% | 5.27% | 57.39% |
| Clark | 65.48% | 29.30% | 5.23% | 36.18% |
| Clay | 57.86% | 34.30% | 7.85% | 23.56% |
| Cleburne | 48.63% | 46.07% | 5.31% | 2.56% |
| Cleveland | 42.46% | 53.89% | 3.66% | 11.43% |
| Columbia | 56.11% | 34.80% | 9.09% | 21.31% |
| Conway | 55.28% | 38.60% | 6.12% | 16.68% |
| Craighead | 63.29% | 28.74% | 7.98% | 34.55% |
| Crawford | 54.02% | 35.77% | 10.21% | 18.25% |
| Crittenden | 75.60% | 17.23% | 7.17% | 58.37% |
| Cross | 64.93% | 27.63% | 7.44% | 37.30% |
| Dallas | 56.82% | 38.68% | 4.51% | 18.14% |
| Desha | 70.94% | 24.93% | 4.14% | 46.01% |
| Drew | 63.46% | 33.31% | 3.23% | 30.15% |
| Faulkner | 52.91% | 39.19% | 7.90% | 13.72% |
| Franklin | 42.59% | 51.60% | 5.81% | 9.01% |
| Fulton | 54.64% | 33.50% | 11.86% | 21.14% |
| Garland | 62.74% | 32.77% | 4.49% | 29.97% |
| Grant | 46.86% | 49.12% | 4.01% | 2.26% |
| Greene | 62.83% | 27.55% | 9.62% | 35.28% |
| Hempstead | 60.85% | 32.40% | 6.75% | 28.45% |
| Hot Spring | 54.25% | 40.77% | 4.97% | 13.48% |
| Howard | 56.17% | 38.43% | 5.40% | 17.74% |
| Independence | 46.57% | 47.75% | 5.68% | 1.18% |
| Izard | 55.58% | 37.12% | 7.30% | 18.46% |
| Jackson | 58.65% | 36.35% | 5.00% | 22.30% |
| Jefferson | 68.76% | 26.15% | 5.09% | 42.61% |
| Johnson | 52.07% | 41.72% | 6.21% | 10.35% |
| Lafayette | 63.22% | 31.63% | 5.15% | 31.59% |
| Lawrence | 53.10% | 37.18% | 9.72% | 15.92% |
| Lee | 69.24% | 24.73% | 6.03% | 44.51% |
| Lincoln | 61.52% | 35.50% | 2.98% | 26.02% |
| Little River | 66.37% | 26.16% | 7.47% | 40.21% |
| Logan | 47.27% | 43.27% | 9.46% | 4.00% |
| Lonoke | 56.56% | 39.24% | 4.20% | 17.32% |
| Madison | 23.43% | 74.31% | 2.25% | 50.88% |
| Marion | 53.87% | 37.94% | 8.18% | 15.93% |
| Miller | 65.18% | 28.97% | 5.85% | 36.21% |
| Mississippi | 69.25% | 23.85% | 6.90% | 45.40% |
| Monroe | 61.58% | 34.79% | 3.63% | 26.79% |
| Montgomery | 51.68% | 42.44% | 5.88% | 9.24% |
| Nevada | 55.69% | 36.62% | 7.70% | 19.07% |
| Newton | No results | | | |
| Ouachita | 64.69% | 29.97% | 5.34% | 34.72% |
| Perry | 50.26% | 44.43% | 5.31% | 5.83% |
| Phillips | 66.54% | 22.10% | 11.36% | 44.44% |
| Pike | 51.71% | 41.37% | 6.92% | 10.34% |
| Poinsett | 62.91% | 30.14% | 6.95% | 32.77% |
| Polk | 60.41% | 31.39% | 8.20% | 29.02% |
| Pope | 50.57% | 44.10% | 5.33% | 6.47% |
| Prairie | 47.61% | 48.05% | 4.34% | 0.44% |
| Pulaski | 70.79% | 25.78% | 3.43% | 45.01% |
| Randolph | 57.75% | 33.35% | 8.90% | 24.40% |
| St. Francis | 67.02% | 27.28% | 5.70% | 39.74% |
| Saline | 59.03% | 36.40% | 4.58% | 22.63% |
| Scott | 52.51% | 33.35% | 14.14% | 19.16% |
| Searcy | 54.95% | 41.55% | 3.50% | 13.40% |
| Sebastian | 60.36% | 32.63% | 7.02% | 27.73% |
| Sevier | 62.53% | 32.11% | 5.36% | 30.42% |
| Sharp | 57.75% | 34.64% | 7.61% | 23.11% |
| Stone | 42.86% | 51.10% | 6.03% | 8.24% |
| Union | 61.78% | 30.84% | 7.39% | 30.94% |
| Van Buren | 49.09% | 45.31% | 5.60% | 3.78% |
| Washington | 68.29% | 26.80% | 4.91% | 41.49% |
| White | 56.88% | 38.51% | 4.61% | 18.37% |
| Woodruff | 72.90% | 23.68% | 3.42% | 49.22% |
| Yell | 47.35% | 45.62% | 7.03% | 1.73% |

== Result ==
Clinton won the election with almost 64% of the vote.

Arkansas gubernatorial election, 1986
| Party | Candidate | Votes | % | ±% |
|---|---|---|---|---|
| Democratic | Bill Clinton (incumbent) | 439,802 | 63.90% | +1.35% |
| Republican | Frank D. White | 248,427 | 36.10% | −1.35% |
| Total votes | | 688,229 | 100.00 | |
| Democratic hold | | | | |

== Works cited ==
- Moreland, Laurence; Steed, Robert; Baker, Tod, eds. (1991). The 1988 Presidential Election in the South: Continuity Amidst Change in Southern Party Politics. Praeger Publishers. ISBN 0275931455.
