= Marshall Chrisman =

American politician (1933-2022)

Marshall Ney Chrisman Jr.

Arkansas State Representative from Franklin and Johnson counties
- In office January 1, 1969 – December 31, 1970
- Succeeded by: Sterling Hurley

Personal details
- Born: May 3, 1933 Coal Hill, Arkansas, U.S.
- Died: December 5, 2022 (aged 89) Ozark, Arkansas, U.S.
- Party: Republican gubernatorial primary candidate, 1980 and 1982
- Spouse(s): (1) Thelma Laverne Tipton Chrisman (divorced) (2) Karon Lee Carpenter Chrisman
- Children: Three sons from first marriage: Steven Lee Chrisman (deceased); Joseph "Jody" Marshall Chrisman; Mark Wayne Chrisman; One daughter from second marriage: Marsha Leney Chrisman
- Parent(s): Marshall Chrisman, Sr. Elva Lee Faucett Chrisman
- Education: Coal Hill High School; University of the Ozarks
- Occupation: Businessman

Military service
- Branch/service: United States Army
- Battles/wars: Korean War

Marshall Ney Chrisman Jr. (May 3, 1933 – December 5, 2022) was an American businessman from Ozark in Franklin County in northwestern Arkansas. He served from 1969 to 1970 as a Republican member of the Arkansas House of Representatives. For a single term, he represented Franklin and neighboring Johnson counties. In 1980 and 1982, Chrisman fell far short in primary bids against Frank D. White for the Republican gubernatorial nomination.

== Background ==
Chrisman was born in Coal Hill in Johnson County to Marshall Chrisman Sr. (1892–1955), a coal miner, and the former Elva Lee Faucett (1898–1979). In 1951, he graduated from Coal Hill High School and then briefly attended what is now the University of the Ozarks. In 1953, he was drafted into the United States Army and served briefly in the Korean War until his discharge in 1955. He returned to Coal Hill, where over the years he has been engaged in principally a sand and gravel company as well as construction, cable television, and coal mining.

Chrisman died in Ozark on December 5, 2022, at the age of 89.

== Legislative record ==
Chrisman had only four Republican colleagues during his one term in the legislature, fellow Representatives George E. Nowotny of Fort Smith, Preston Bynum, then of Siloam Springs, and Danny L. Patrick of Madison County, and State Senator Jim R. Caldwell of Rogers, the first Republican elected in the 20th century to the upper legislative chamber.

In 1969, Representative Chrisman worked reluctantly with Governor Winthrop Rockefeller, the first Arkansas Republican chief executive since the Reconstruction era, to pass a local-option bill to permit liquor in private clubs. Known as liquor-by-the-drink, the measure was then a controversial proposal which later lost much of its political divisiveness. Chrisman first voted against the measure because Johnson and Franklin counties then had prohibition. Chrisman then reversed himself at the request of constituents at the Clarksville Country Club in Clarksville. A second legislator also switched sides, and the measure passed, fifty-one to forty-nine, without the need for House Speaker Hayes McClerkin of Texarkana to break a tie.

== Gubernatorial bids ==
After his legislative term, Chrisman was the chairman of the Franklin County Republican Party but was required to vacate that position when he entered the 1980 gubernatorial primary against Frank White. Chrisman said that he considered White too new to the Republican Party. From 1975 to 1977, White had been a Democrat in the administration of Governor David Pryor as the executive director of the Arkansas Industrial Development Commission, a post which Rockefeller had filled under Orval Faubus from 1955 to 1964.

Chrisman called White an "opportunist" who was attempting to take advantage of the opposition that had unexpectedly surfaced to Governor Bill Clinton's 1979 proposal to double automobile license fees. Most Republican leaders preferred White, the president of Capital Savings and Loan Association in Little Rock, because he was better known statewide than Chrisman and had a more polished public relations style. White claimed that his own late conversion to the GOP was intended to revive the two-party system in the post-Rockefeller years.

In the extremely low-turnout open primary election of 1980, White defeated Chrisman, 5,867 votes (71.8 percent) to 2,310 (28.2 percent). Chrisman won his own Franklin County plus Ashley, Johnson, Madison, and Marion. Eight counties cast 76 percent of the total; Benton, Washington, and Pulaski alone accounted for 56 percent of GOP ballots.

In 1982, Chrisman renewed his primary challenge to White, whom he called "a do-nothing governor" who did not consult the county Republican executive committees regarding patronage positions. When he paid his $1,500 filing fee, the crusty Chrisman described the atmosphere at state headquarters as so cool that he had to "scrape the icicles off me when I left." Chrisman declared that factory jobs paying low wages were not the solution to the long-term economy. The Arkansas Gazette lauded Chrisman's call for tax increases though he had held the line on higher revenues as a fiscal conservative in the Rockefeller administration: "Already Mr. Chrisman has set a refreshing example for the campaign in both parties by actually addressing a substantive issue. He said the state needed to raise taxes to improve education, drug rehabilitation, and other public services, and he promised a statewide work-release system for the prisons." Chrisman specifically proposed increasing the sales, tobacco, and alcohol taxes, a position opposed by both White and Clinton.

A third candidate seeking the Republican gubernatorial nomination, Connie K. Voll (born 1945) of Lonoke, is a native of Searcy, a graduate of Louisiana Tech University in Ruston, and then a nutritionist and management consultant in Little Rock., Voll was the first woman in either party to have sought the governorship since Virginia Morris Johnson of Conway, the wife of former gubernatorial nominee James D. Johnson, had unsuccessfully contested the 1968 Democratic nomination for the right to run against Rockefeller.

White won re-nomination with 11,111 votes (83.2 percent); Chrisman received 10.6 percent of the vote but led only in Madison County. Voll obtained the remaining 6.2 percent but received only four votes in her own county. Four counties, Benton, Pulaski, Searcy, and Washington, counted at least one thousand Republican primary votes. Noticeably, not a single Republican primary ballot was cast in Conway County, the home of Winthrop Rockefeller, who had died nine years earlier in 1973.
