= 1978 Arkansas gubernatorial election =

- November 7, 1978
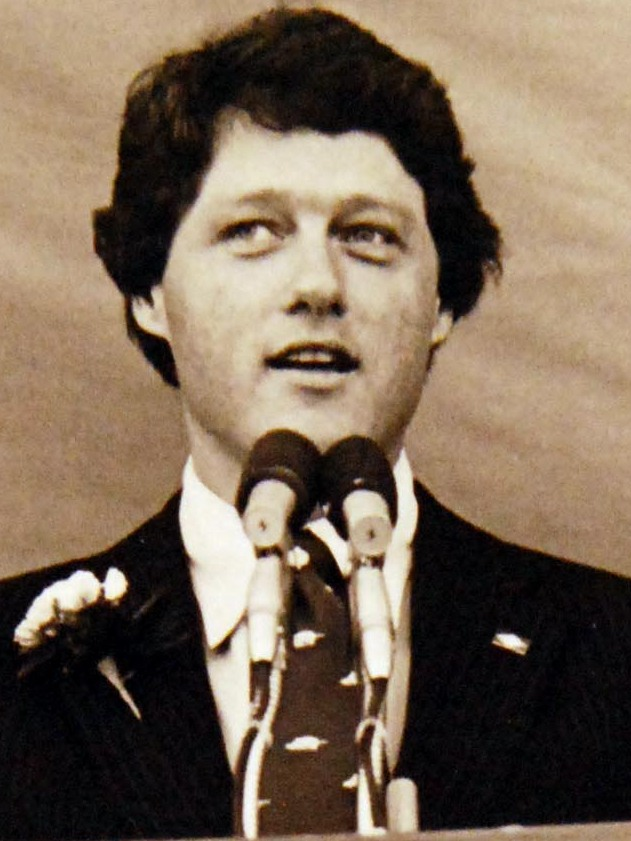
Nominee	Bill Clinton	Lynn Lowe
Party	Democratic	Republican
Popular vote	335,101	193,746
Percentage	63.36%	36.64%
- County results Clinton: 50–60% 60–70% 70–80% 80–90% Lowe: 50–60% 60–70%
Governor before election
David Pryor
Democratic
Elected Governor
Bill Clinton
Democratic

The 1978 Arkansas gubernatorial election, held on November 7, was the first time that future president Bill Clinton was elected Governor of Arkansas.

== Democratic primary ==
At this time, one gubernatorial term was two years. Incumbent two-term Democratic governor David Pryor decided to not seek re-election in order to run for the United States Senate, as his predecessor and future Senate colleague Dale Bumpers did.

=== Candidates ===
- Bill Clinton, Attorney General
- Frank Lady II, former state representative and candidate for governor in 1976
- Randall Mathis, Clark County Judge
- Monroe Schwarzlose, turkey farmer
- Joe Woodward, Seventh Circuit Prosecuting Attorney

=== Results ===
Clinton, a former assistant to U.S. senator J. William Fulbright and since 1977 the state attorney general, won the nomination easily.

Democratic primary results
Party	Candidate	Votes	%
Democratic	Bill Clinton	341,118	59.55
Democratic	Joe Woodward	123,674	21.59
Democratic	Frank Lady II	76,026	13.27
Democratic	Randall Mathis	26,096	4.56
Democratic	Monroe Schwarzlose	5,898	1.03
Total votes		572,809	100.00

== Republican nomination ==
A. Lynn Lowe, a Texarkana farmer, who served as state Republican Party chairman from 1974 to 1980, was unopposed for the 1978 gubernatorial nomination. He had also been the Republican nominee for Arkansas's 4th congressional district seat in 1966.

== Election result ==
Clinton easily won the general election.

Arkansas gubernatorial election, 1978
Party	Candidate	Votes	%
Democratic	Bill Clinton	335,101	63.36
Republican	Lynn Lowe	193,746	36.64
Total votes		528,847	100.00
Democratic hold			

Clinton also led in fundraising. His campaign budget was a combined $709,234.00 while Lynn's was $171,382.

Clinton, at the age of thirty-two, became the youngest man to be elected Arkansas governor, the youngest governor in the United States since Harold E. Stassen won in Minnesota in 1938 at the age of thirty-one, and the youngest governor in the nation at this time. In 1992 he was elected as the third-youngest U.S. president in history.

Lowe's total was the highest for a Republican nominee in Arkansas since Winthrop Rockefeller's third term bid in 1970. He carried fourteen out of seventy-five counties, including Miller, Columbia, and Union counties in South Arkansas.
