= 1980 Arkansas gubernatorial election =

- November 4, 1980
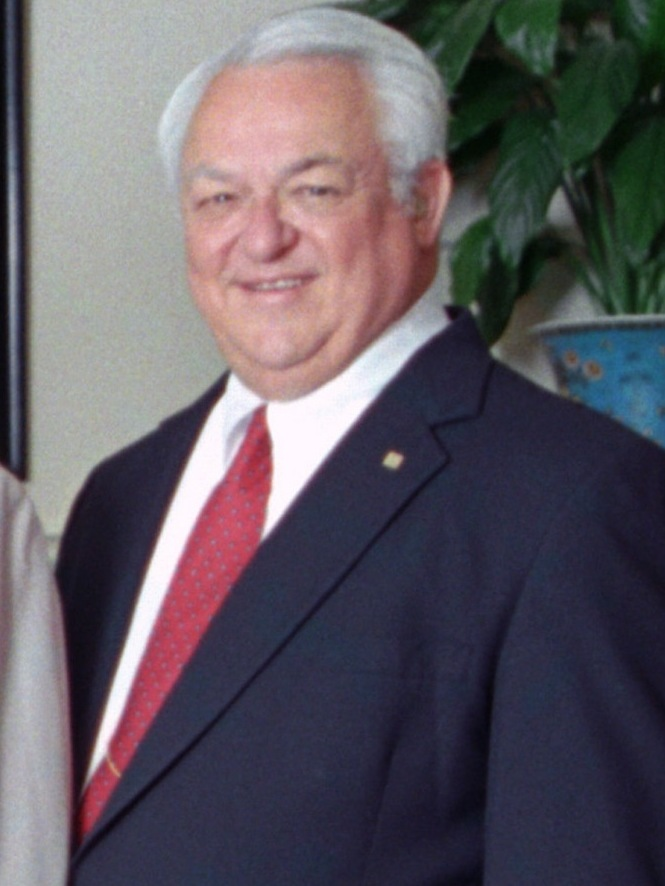

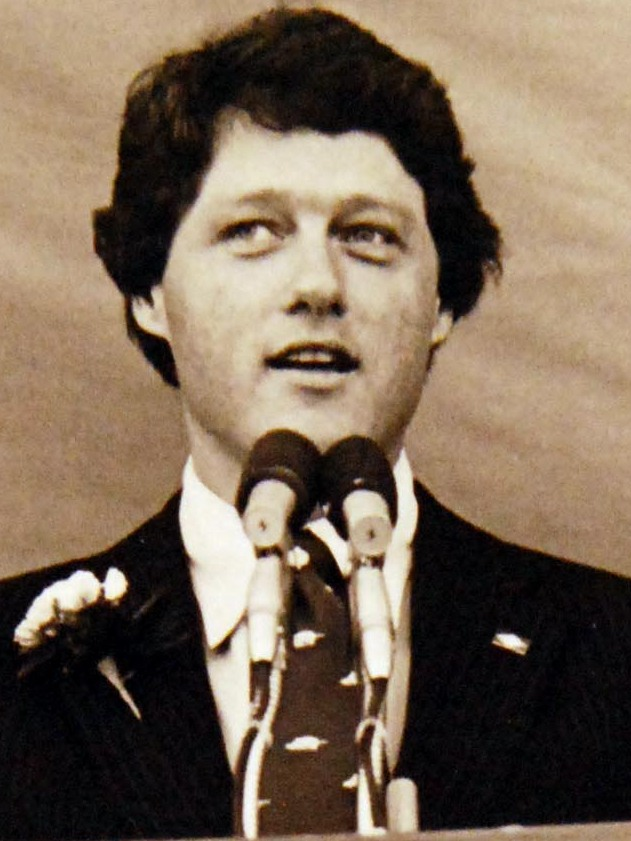
Nominee	Frank D. White	Bill Clinton
Party	Republican	Democratic
Popular vote	435,684	403,241
Percentage	51.93%	48.07%
- County results White: 50–60% 60–70% 70–80% Clinton: 50–60% 60–70%
Governor before election
Bill Clinton
Democratic
Elected Governor
Frank D. White
Republican

The 1980 Arkansas gubernatorial election was a biennial election for the governorship of Arkansas. One-term Democratic governor and future president Bill Clinton was narrowly defeated by Republican Frank D. White. It was only the third time since Reconstruction that a Republican candidate had won the state's governorship.

Clinton ran again two years later and regained the governorship, continuing to serve until he was elected to the presidency in 1992.

== Democratic primary ==
=== Candidates ===
- Bill Clinton, incumbent governor
- Monroe Schwarzlose, candidate for governor in 1978 and Republican candidate for the Arkansas House of Representatives in 1974

=== Results ===
Democratic primary results
Party	Candidate	Votes	%
Democratic	Bill Clinton (incumbent)	306,736	68.87
Democratic	Monroe Schwarzlose	138,670	31.13
Total votes		445,395	100.00

== Republican primary ==
=== Candidates ===
- Marshall Chrisman, former state representative
- Frank D. White, Savings and Loan executive and former head of the Arkansas Industrial Development Commission

=== Results ===
Republican primary results
Party	Candidate	Votes	%
Republican	Frank D. White	5,867	71.75
Republican	Marshall Chrisman	2,310	28.25
Total votes		8,177	100.00

== Campaign ==
Schwarzlose's unexpected strong challenge in primaries and his 31 percent of the primary vote foreshadowed that Clinton could be in trouble for the upcoming general election.

Clinton's increase in the cost of automobile registration tags had been unpopular. He was also hurt by President Jimmy Carter's decision to send thousands of Cuban refugees, some unruly, to a detention camp at Fort Chaffee, outside Fort Smith in Sebastian County in western Arkansas. (See Mariel boatlift.)

The 1980 general election was marked by decisive Republican victories—the GOP won the White House, a majority in United States Senate and 34 seats in the United States House of Representatives. Clinton's narrow loss was viewed as part of Reagan's coattails.

== Result ==
Frank White narrowly won the election.

Arkansas gubernatorial election, 1980
Party	Candidate	Votes	%	±%
Republican	Frank D. White	435,684	51.93%	+15.29%
Democratic	Bill Clinton (incumbent)	403,241	48.07%	−15.29%
Total votes		838,925	100.00%	N/A
Republican gain from Democratic				

== Effect ==
After Clinton lost the election in 1980, Max Brantley said: "The guy was like a death in the family. He was really destroyed after that election". Rudy Moore also added: "He never blamed anybody else. He accepted the responsibility. He didn't whine about it. In fact, it was within days, we were trying to figure out what we could to do to improve his political life after that".

After Clinton was defeated, he was offered the chance to lead the Democratic National Committee, instead of seeking reelection as Governor of Arkansas. When he campaigned for election in 1982 against White, he said that he had learned the importance of adaptability and compromise from his defeat two years beforehand.

== See also ==
- 1980 United States presidential election in Arkansas
