= 1984 Arkansas gubernatorial election =

- November 6, 1984
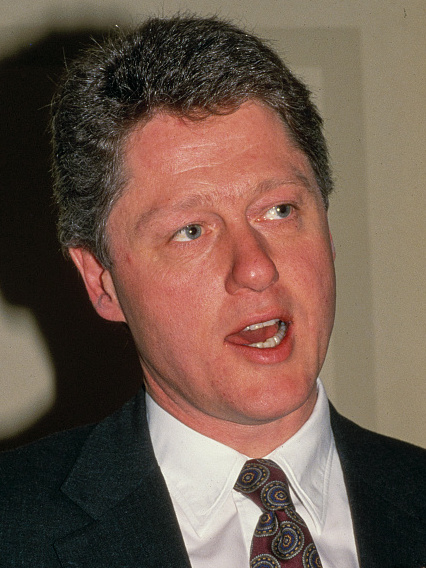

Nominee	Bill Clinton	Woody Freeman
Party	Democratic	Republican
Popular vote	554,561	331,987
Percentage	62.55%	37.45%
- County results Clinton: 50–60% 60–70% 70–80% 80–90% Freeman: 50–60%
Governor before election
Bill Clinton
Democratic
Elected Governor
Bill Clinton
Democratic

The 1984 Arkansas gubernatorial election was held on November 6, 1984. Incumbent Governor Bill Clinton won reelection with a 25% margin of victory over Jonesboro businessman Woody Freeman. This was the last gubernatorial election in Arkansas before the implementation of Amendment 63, lengthening the term of the governor of Arkansas from two to four years. Winning his third of five terms as Governor of Arkansas, Clinton continued to serve this office until shortly after he was elected to the presidency in 1992.

== Democratic primary ==
Democratic primary results
Party	Candidate	Votes	%
Democratic	Bill Clinton (incumbent)	317,214	64.43
Democratic	Lonnie Turner	119,264	24.23
Democratic	Kermit Moss	31,727	6.44
Democratic	Monroe Schwarzlose	24,116	4.90
Total votes		492,321	100.00

=== Democratic nominee ===
- Bill Clinton, incumbent Governor

== Republican primary ==
Republican primary results
Party	Candidate	Votes	%
Republican	Woody Freeman	13,030	68.48
Republican	Erwin Davis	6,010	31.57
Total votes			

=== Republican Nominee ===
- Woody Freeman, businessman

== Campaign ==
During Governor Clinton's reelection campaign, he pointed to efforts in pushing through strong education reform including competency tests for new and working teachers and raising pay for most of Arkansas teachers, using anger from the Arkansas teachers’ unions to his advantage. Freeman attacked Clinton on not focusing on economic issues, pledging not to raise taxes and running the state government more like a business. Freeman saw some high profile visits from prominent Republicans, including then President Ronald Reagan, who campaigned for Freeman. During a rally for the Reagan/Bush reelection campaign just days before election day Reagan told an audience, "Please send Woody Freeman to the Statehouse." Former Secretary of State Henry Kissinger also campaigned for Freeman during the election but seemed to have little of substance to offer the Arkansas candidate, and Governor Clinton on the campaign trail attacked the visit saying that, "I hope Mr. Kissinger tells us everything he knows about what Arkansas needs, and I hope my opponent tells Mr. Kissinger everything he knows about what Arkansas needs in a utility contractor."

== Result ==
Arkansas gubernatorial election, 1984
Party	Candidate	Votes	%	±%
Democratic	Bill Clinton (incumbent)	554,561	62.55%	+7.84%
Republican	Woody Freeman	331,987	37.45%	−7.84%
Total votes		886,548	100.00	
Democratic hold				

== See also ==
- United States presidential election in Arkansas, 1984
