= 1896 United States gubernatorial elections =

- November 3, 1896 (Note: Alabama, Arkansas, Florida, Georgia, Louisiana, Maine, Rhode Island and Vermont held early elections.)

32 governorships
	Majority party	Minority party
Party	Republican	Democratic
Seats before	26	17
Seats after	24	16
Seat change	▼2	▼1
Seats up	17	14
Seats won	15	13
	Third party	Fourth party
Party	Populist	Silver
Seats before	1	1
Seats after	4	1
Seat change	▲3	Steady
Seats up	1	0
Seats won	4	0
- Democratic gain Democratic hold Republican gain Republican hold Populist gain Populist hold

United States gubernatorial elections were held in 1896, in 32 states, concurrent with the House, Senate elections and presidential election, on November 3, 1896 (except in Alabama, Arkansas, Florida, Georgia, Louisiana, Maine, Rhode Island and Vermont, which held early elections).

Following the death of Delaware Governor Joshua H. Marvil, the General Assembly scheduled the next gubernatorial election for 1896, two years into the term. Delaware's gubernatorial elections have been held in presidential election years ever since.

In Florida, the gubernatorial election was held in October for the last time. The subsequent election days were moved to the same day as federal elections from the 1900 elections.

== Results ==
State	Incumbent	Party	Status	Opposing candidates
Alabama (held, 3 August 1896)	William C. Oates	Democratic	Retired to run for U.S. Senate, Democratic victory	Joseph F. Johnston (Democratic) 59.01% Albert Taylor Goodwyn (Populist) (Note: Some 19th Century sources indicate Goodwyn ran under a fusion ticket between the Populists and the Republicans.) 40.99%
Arkansas (held, 7 September 1896)	James Paul Clarke	Democratic	Retired to run for U.S. Senate, Democratic victory	Daniel Webster Jones (Democratic) 64.26% Harmon L. Remmel (Republican) 25.28% Abner W. Files (Populist) 9.86% J. W. Miller (Prohibition) 0.60%
Colorado	Albert McIntire	Republican	[data missing]	Alva Adams (Democratic) (Note: Adams ran under a fusion ticket between the Democrats and the Silver Republican Party) 46.22% Morton Shelley Bailey (Populist) (Note: Bailey ran under a fusion ticket between the Populists and the National Silver Party) 37.98% George W. Allen (Republican) 12.66% Davis H. Waite (Midroad-Populist) 1.78% Scattering 1.36%
Connecticut	Owen Vincent Coffin	Republican	Retired, Republican victory	Lorrin A. Cooke (Republican) 62.53% Joseph B. Sargent (Democratic) 32.48% Lewis Sperry (National Democratic) 3.21% Edward Manchester (Prohibition) 1.06% John A. Norton (Socialist Labor) 0.72%
Delaware	William T. Watson (acting)	Democratic	Term-limited, Democratic victory	Ebe W. Tunnell (Democratic) 44.20% John H. Hoffecker (Union Republican) 31.40% John C. Higgins (Anti-Addicks Republican) 20.39% Louis N. Slaughter (Single Tax) 2.44% Daniel M. Green (Prohibition) 1.56% Scattering 0.01%
Florida (held, 6 October 1896)	Henry L. Mitchell	Democratic	Term-limited, Democratic victory	William D. Bloxham (Democratic) 66.71% Edward R. Gunby (Republican) 20.35% William A. Wicks (Populist) 12.94%
Georgia (held, 7 October 1896)	William Yates Atkinson	Democratic	Re-elected, 58.47%	Seaborn Wright (Populist) 41.53%
Idaho	William J. McConnell	Republican	Retired, Democratic victory	Frank Steunenberg (Democratic) (Note: Steunenberg ran under a fusion ticket between the Democrats, the Populists and the Silver Republican Party.) 76.79% David Budlong (Republican) 22.38% Moses F. Fowler (Prohibition) 0.83%
Illinois	John Peter Altgeld	Democratic	Defeated, 43.66%	John Riley Tanner (Republican) 54.10% George Washington Gere (Prohibition) 1.34% William St. John Forman (National Democratic) 0.75% Charles A. Baustian (Socialist Labor) 0.09% Isaac W. Higgs (National Prohibition) 0.07%
Indiana	Claude Matthews	Democratic	Term-limited, Republican victory	James A. Mount (Republican) 50.93% Benjamin F. Shively (Democratic) 46.79% Thomas Wadsworth (Populist) 1.37% Leander M. Crist (Prohibition) 0.48% A. G. Burkhart (National Prohibition) 0.40% Philip H. Moore (Socialist Labor) 0.04%
Kansas	Edmund Needham Morrill	Republican	Defeated, 48.30%	John W. Leedy (Populist) (Note: Leedy ran under a fusion ticket between the Democrats and the Populist Party.) 50.56% Horace Hurley (Prohibition) 0.71% Henry L. Douthart (National Prohibition) 0.23% A. E. Kepford (Independent Prohibition) 0.21%
Louisiana (held, 21 April 1896)	Murphy J. Foster	Democratic	Re-elected, 56.27%	John N. Pharr (Populist) (Note: Pharr ran under a fusion ticket between the Republicans and the Populist Party.) 43.64% A. B. Booth 0.09%
Maine (held, 14 September 1896)	Henry B. Cleaves	Republican	Retired, Republican victory	Llewellyn Powers (Republican) 66.84% Melvin P. Frank (Democratic) 27.79% Luther C. Bateman (Populist) 2.67% Ammi S. Ladd (Prohibition) 2.19% William H. Clifford (National Democratic) 0.49% Scattering 0.03%
Massachusetts	Roger Wolcott (acting)	Republican	Re-elected, 67.05%	George Fred Williams (Democratic) 26.92% Frederick O. Prince (National Democratic) 3.68% Thomas C. Brophy (Socialist Labor) 1.18% Allen Coffin (Prohibition) 1.16%
Michigan	John T. Rich	Republican	Retired, Republican victory	Hazen S. Pingree (Republican) 55.57% Charles R. Sligh (Democratic) (Note: Sligh ran under a fusion ticket between the Democrats, the Populists and the Union Silver Party.) 40.35% Rufus S. Sprague (National Democratic) 1.78% Robert C. Safford (Prohibition) 1.00% John Gilberson (National Prohibition) 0.35% Scattering 0.94%
Minnesota	David Marston Clough (acting)	Republican	Re-elected, 49.18%	John Lind (Democratic) (Note: Lind ran under a fusion ticket between the Democrats and the Populist Party.) 48.10% William J. Dean (Prohibition) 1.53% Albert Alonzo Ames (Independent) 0.86% William B. Hammond (Socialist Labor) 0.33%
Missouri	William J. Stone	Democratic	Term-limited, Democratic victory	Lon Vest Stephens (Democratic) 52.88% Robert E. Lewis (Republican) 46.35% Herman P. Faris (Prohibition) 0.39% J. McDowell Trimble (National Democratic) 0.27% Louis C. Fry (Socialist Labor) 0.11%
Montana	John E. Rickards	Republican	Lost re-nomination, Democratic victory	Robert Burns Smith (Democratic) (Note: Smith ran under a fusion ticket between the Democrats and the Populist Party.) 70.99% Alexander C. Botkin (Republican) (Note: Botkin ran under a fusion ticket between the Republicans and the Silver Republican Party.) 29.01%
Nebraska	Silas A. Holcomb	Populist (Note: Holcomb ran under a fusion ticket between the Democrats and the Populist Party.)	Re-elected, 53.46%	John H. McColl (Republican) 43.50% Robert S. Bibb (National Democratic) 1.63% Joel Warner (Prohibition) 0.72% Richard H. Hawley (National Prohibition) 0.43% Charles Sadilek (Socialist Labor) 0.27%
New Hampshire	Charles A. Busiel	Republican	Retired, Republican victory	George A. Ramsdell (Republican) 61.41% Henry O. Kent (Democratic) 35.96% John C. Berry (Prohibition) 1.34% Harry H. Acton (Socialist Labor) 0.61% Gardiner J. Greenleaf (Populist) 0.36% George W. Barnard (National) 0.29% Scattering 0.02%
New York	Levi P. Morton	Republican	Retired, Republican victory	Frank S. Black (Republican) 55.28% Wilbur E. Porter (Democratic) 40.33% Daniel G. Griffin (National Democratic) 1.87% Howard Balkam (Socialist Labor) 1.29% William W. Smith (Prohibition) 1.22%
North Carolina	Elias Carr	Democratic	Term-limited, Republican victory	Daniel Lindsay Russell (Republican) 46.46% Cyrus B. Watson (Democratic) 43.89% William A. Guthrie (Populist) 9.41% James R. Jones (National Prohibition) 0.17% Jeremiah W. Holt (Prohibition) 0.07%
North Dakota	Roger Allin	Republican	Lost re-nomination, Republican victory	Frank A. Briggs (Republican) 55.61% Robert B. Richardson (Populist) (Note: Richardson ran under a fusion ticket between the Democrats and the Populist Party.) 44.39%
Rhode Island (held, 1 April 1896)	Charles W. Lippitt	Republican	Re-elected, 56.40%	George L. Littlefield (Democratic) 33.79% Thomas H. Peabody (Prohibition) 5.84% Edward W. Thienert (Socialist Labor) 2.52% Henry A. Burlingame (Populist) 1.45%
South Carolina	John Gary Evans	Democratic	Retired, Democratic victory	William Haselden Ellerbe (Democratic) 89.18% Sampson Pope (Lily-White Republican) 6.65% R. M. Wallace (Black and Tan Republican) 4.17%
South Dakota	Charles H. Sheldon	Republican	Retired, Populist victory	Andrew E. Lee (Populist) (Note: Some sources indicate Lee ran under a fusion ticket between the Democrats and the Populist Party.) 49.76% A. O. Ringsrud (Republican) 49.37% J. F. Hanson (Prohibition) 0.87%
Tennessee	Peter Turney	Democratic	Retired, Democratic victory	Robert Love Taylor (Democratic) 48.76% G. N. Tillman (Republican) 46.62% A. L. Mims (Populist) 3.74% Josephus Hopwood (Prohibition) 0.88%
Texas	Charles A. Culberson	Democratic	Re-elected, 55.31%	Jerome C. Kearby (Republican) 44.22% Randolph Clark (Prohibition) 0.35% Scattering 0.13%
Vermont (held, 1 September 1896)	Urban A. Woodbury	Republican	Retired, Republican victory	Josiah Grout (Republican) 76.41% J. Henry Jackson (Democratic) 21.25% Joseph Battell (Populist) 1.19% Rodney Whittemore (Prohibition) 1.08% Scattering 0.08%
Washington	John McGraw	Republican	Retired, Populist victory	John Rankin Rogers (Populist) (Note: Rogers ran under a fusion ticket between the Democrats and the Populist Party) 55.55% Potter C. Sullivan (Republican) 41.68% Robert E. Dunlap (Prohibition) 2.78%
West Virginia	William A. MacCorkle	Democratic	Term-limited, Republican victory	George W. Atkinson (Republican) 52.41% Cornelius Clarkson Watts (Democratic) 46.44% T. C. Johnson (Prohibition) 0.67% N. W. Fitzgerald (Populist) 0.40% Scattering 0.08%
Wisconsin	William H. Upham	Republican	Retired, Republican victory	Edward Scofield (Republican) 59.67% Willis C. Silverthorn (Democratic) 38.11% Joshua H. Berkey (Prohibition) 1.83% Christ Tuttrop (Socialist Labor) 0.29% Robert Henderson (National Prohibition) 0.09%

== See also ==
- 1896 United States elections

== Bibliography ==
- Glashan, Roy R. (1979). American Governors and Gubernatorial Elections, 1775-1978. Meckler Books. ISBN 0-930466-17-9.
- Gubernatorial Elections, 1787-1997. Washington, D.C.: Congressional Quarterly Inc. 1998. ISBN 1-56802-396-0.
- Dubin, Michael J. (2014). United States Gubernatorial Elections, 1861-1911: The Official Results by State and County. Jefferson, North Carolina: McFarland. ISBN 978-0-7864-4722-0.
- The World Almanac and Encyclopedia, 1897. New York, NY: The Press Publishing Co. 1897.
- Rhoades, Henry Eckford, ed. (1897). The Tribune Almanac and Political Register, 1897. New York, NY: The Tribune Association.
