= 1900 Arkansas gubernatorial election =

- September 3, 1900
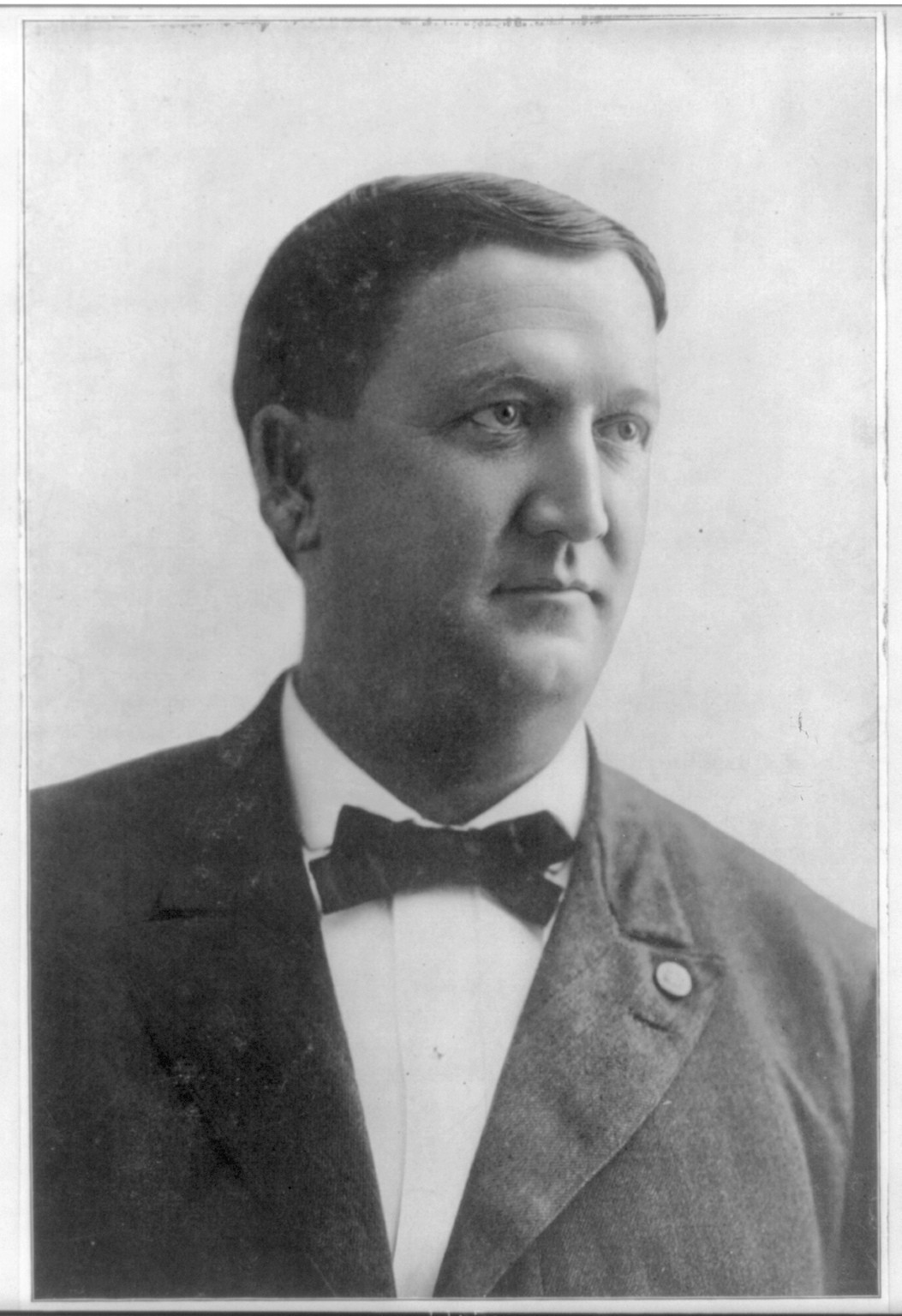

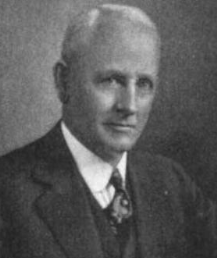
Nominee	Jeff Davis	Harmon L. Remmel
Party	Democratic	Republican
Popular vote	88,636	40,701
Percentage	66.65%	30.61%
- County results Davis: 50–60% 60–70% 70–80% 80–90% 90–100% Remmel: 50–60% 60–70%
Governor before election
Daniel W. Jones
Democratic
Elected Governor
Jeff Davis
Democratic

The 1900 Arkansas gubernatorial election was held on September 3, 1900.

Incumbent Democratic Governor Daniel W. Jones did not stand for re-election.

Democratic nominee Jeff Davis defeated Republican nominee Harmon L. Remmel and Populist nominee Abner W. Files with 66.65% of the vote.

== General election ==
=== Candidates ===
- Jeff Davis, Democratic, incumbent Attorney General of Arkansas
- Harmon L. Remmel, Republican, candidate for governor in 1894 and 1896
- Abner W. Files, Populist, candidate for governor in 1896

=== Results ===
1900 Arkansas gubernatorial election (Note: Some sources, including the Arkansas Senate Journal, give Davis' vote as 88,637.)
Party	Candidate	Votes	%	±%
Democratic	Jeff Davis	88,636	66.65%	−0.70%
Republican	Harmon L. Remmel	40,701	30.61%	+6.01%
Populist	Abner W. Files	3,641	2.74%	−4.71%
Majority		47,935	36.04%	
Turnout		132,978		
Democratic hold		Swing		
