= 1900 United States gubernatorial elections =

- November 6, 1900 (Note: Alabama, Arkansas, Georgia, Louisiana, Maine, North Carolina, Rhode Island and Vermont held early elections.)

34 governorships (Note: Including a special election in Kentucky.)
	Majority party	Minority party
Party	Republican	Democratic
Seats before	23	18 (Note: Kentucky Governor William S. Taylor (R) was removed from office by the General Assembly in January 1900 and replaced by William Goebel (D))
Seats after	26	18
Seat change	▲3	Steady
Seats up	16	15
Seats won	19	15
	Third party	Fourth party
Party	Populist	Silver
Seats before	3	1
Seats after	0	1
Seat change	▼3	Steady
Seats up	3	0
Seats won	0	0
- Democratic gain Democratic hold Republican gain Republican hold

United States gubernatorial elections were held in 1900, in 34 states, concurrent with the House, Senate elections and presidential election, on November 6, 1900 (except in Alabama, Arkansas, Georgia, Louisiana, Maine, North Carolina, Rhode Island and Vermont, which held early elections).

Alabama held its last gubernatorial election in August, while Rhode Island held its last in April. In both cases the next gubernatorial election would be held on the same day as federal elections: in Alabama in 1902 and in Rhode Island in 1901. There was a change in Alabama's governorships in 1902, when governors served four-year terms instead of two-year terms.

In Florida, the gubernatorial election was held on the same day as federal elections, having been held in October since 1892.

In North Carolina gubernatorial elections had been held on the same day as federal elections since 1876, but in 1900 the election was moved to August. It would revert to November from 1904.

== Results ==
State	Incumbent	Party	Status	Opposing candidates
Alabama (held, 6 August 1900)	Joseph F. Johnston	Democratic	Retired to run for U.S. Senate, Democratic victory	William J. Samford (Democratic) 71.57% John A. Steele (Republican) 17.59% Grattan B. Crowe (Populist) 10.84%
Arkansas (held, 3 September 1900)	Daniel Webster Jones	Democratic	Retired to run for U.S. Senate, Democratic victory	Jeff Davis (Democratic) 66.66% Harmon L. Remmel (Republican) 30.61% Abner W. Files (Populist) 2.74%
Colorado	Charles S. Thomas	Democratic	[data missing]	James Bradley Orman (Democratic) (Note: Orman ran under a fusion ticket between the Democrats and the Populist Party) 53.78% Frank C. Goudy (Republican) 43.53% James R. Wylie (Prohibition) 1.68% DeWitt Copley (Socialist Labor) 0.45% S. B. Hutchinson (Social Democrat) 0.38% James T. Pearson (Populist) 0.19%
Connecticut	George E. Lounsbury	Republican	[data missing]	George P. McLean (Republican) 53.02% Samuel L. Bronson (Democratic) 45.05% Charles E. Steele (Prohibition) 0.86% George A. Sweetland (Social Democrat) 0.58% Adam Marx (Socialist Labor) 0.49%
Delaware	Ebe W. Tunnell	Democratic	Retired, Republican victory	John Hunn (Republican) 53.57% Peter J. Ford (Democratic) 44.93% Richard W. Cooper (Prohibition) 1.37% Gustave E. Reinicke (Socialist) 0.13%
Florida	William D. Bloxham	Democratic	Term-limited, Democratic victory	William Sherman Jennings (Democratic) 80.98% Matthew B. MacFarlane (Republican) 17.27% A.M. Morton (Populist) 1.75%
Georgia (held, 3 October 1900)	Allen D. Candler	Democratic	Re-elected, 78.57%	George W. Trayler (Note: OurCampaigns names this candidate John W. Traylor) (Populist) 21.43%
Idaho	Frank Steunenberg	Democratic	Retired, Democratic victory	Frank W. Hunt (Democratic) (Note: Some sources indicate Hunt ran under a fusion ticket between the Democrats and the Populist Party) 50.87% D. W. Standrod (Republican) 47.04% Silas Luttrell (Prohibition) 1.84% Scattering 0.25%
Illinois	John Riley Tanner	Republican	Retired to run for U.S. Senate, Republican victory	Richard Yates Jr. (Republican) 51.49% Samuel Alschuler (Democratic) 46.06% Visscher Vare Barnes (Prohibition) 1.39% Herman C. Perry (Social Democrat) 0.76% Louis P. Hoffman (Socialist Labor) 0.12% Alfred Cheesbrough Van Tine (Populist) 0.10% Lloyd G. Spencer (Union Reform) 0.06% John Cordingly (United Christian) 0.03%
Indiana	James A. Mount	Republican	Term-limited, Republican victory	Winfield T. Durbin (Republican) 50.54% John W. Kern (Democratic) 46.70% Charles Eckhart (Prohibition) 2.05% John W. Kelly (Social Democrat) 0.34% A. G. Burkhart (Populist) 0.23% Philip H. More (Socialist Labor) 0.10% M. A. Wilson (Union Reform) 0.04% Scattering 0.00%
Kansas	William Eugene Stanley	Republican	Re-elected, 52.25%	John W. Breidenthal (Populist) 47.33% G. C. Clemens (Social Democrat) 0.36% Frank Holsinger (Prohibition) 0.06% Scattering 0.00%
Kentucky (special election)	J. C. W. Beckham	Democratic	Re-elected, 49.89%	John W. Yerkes (Republican) 49.09% John D. White (Prohibition) 0.49% A. H. Cardin (Populist) 0.36% Walter T. Roberts (Social Democrat) 0.10% James Doyle (Socialist Labor) 0.09%
Louisiana (held, 17 April 1900)	Murphy J. Foster	Democratic	Term-limited, Democratic victory	William Wright Heard (Democratic) 78.32% Donaldson Caffery III (Fusion) (Note: Caffery ran under a fusion ticket between the Populist Party and the Lily-White Republicans) 18.49% Eugene S. Reems (Republican) 3.19%
Maine (held, 10 September 1900)	Llewellyn Powers	Republican	[data missing]	John Fremont Hill (Republican) 62.33% Samuel L. Lord (Democratic) 34.01% Grant Rogers (Prohibition) 3.10% Norman Wallace Lermond (Socialist) 0.55% Scattering 0.02%
Massachusetts	Winthrop M. Crane	Republican	Re-elected, 59.06%	Robert Treat Paine (Democratic) 33.69% Charles H. Bradley (Social Democrat) 3.43% Michael T. Berry (Socialist Labor) 2.28% John M. Fisher (Prohibition) 1.54% Scattering 0.00%
Michigan	Hazen S. Pingree	Republican	Retired, Republican victory	Aaron T. Bliss (Republican) 55.75% William C. Maybury (Democratic) 41.27% Frederic S. Goodrich (Prohibition) 2.16% Henry Ramsay (Social Democrat) 0.49% Henry Ulbricht (Socialist Labor) 0.18% Daniel Thompson (Populist) 0.16% Scattering 0.00%
Minnesota	John Lind	Democratic (Note: Lind ran under a fusion ticket between the Democrats and the Populist Party)	Defeated, 47.95%	Samuel Rinnah Van Sant (Republican) 48.67% Bernt B. Haugan (Prohibition) 1.73% Thomas H. Lucas (Social Democrat) 1.13% Edward Kriz (Socialist Labor) 0.28% Sylvester M. Fairchild (Midroad-Populist) 0.24%
Missouri	Lon Vest Stephens	Democratic	Term-limited, Democratic victory	Alexander Monroe Dockery (Democratic) 51.15% Joseph Flory (Republican) 46.46% Caleb Lipscomb (Social Democrat) 0.82% Charles E. Stokes (Prohibition) 0.76% J. H. Hillis (People's Progressive) 0.64% Louis C. Fry (Socialist Labor) 0.18%
Montana	Robert Burns Smith	Democratic (Note: Smith ran under a fusion ticket between the Democrats and the Populist Party)	Retired, Democratic victory	Joseph Toole (Democratic) 49.24% David S. Folsom (Republican) 35.56% Thomas S. Hogan (Independent Democrat) 14.40% J. F. Fox (Social Democrat) 0.79%
Nebraska	William A. Poynter	Populist (Note: Poynter ran under a fusion ticket between the Democrats and the Populist Party)	Defeated, 48.51%	Charles Henry Dietrich (Republican) 48.88% Lucius O. Jones (Prohibition) 1.85% Taylor Flick (Midroad-Populist) 0.47% Theodore Kharas (Socialist) 0.29%
New Hampshire	Frank W. Rollins	Republican	Retired, Republican victory	Chester B. Jordan (Republican) 59.36% Frederick E. Potter (Democratic) 38.50% Josiah M. Fletcher (Prohibition) 1.30% Sumner F. Claflin (Social Democrat) 0.83% Scattering 0.01%
New York	Theodore Roosevelt	Republican	Retired to run for U.S. Vice President, Republican victory	Benjamin Odell (Republican) 51.98% John B. Stanchfield (Democratic) 44.80% William T. Wardwell (Prohibition) 1.47% Charles Hunter Corregan (Socialist Labor) 0.89% Ben Hanford (Social Democrat) 0.87%
North Carolina (held, 2 August 1900)	Daniel Lindsay Russell	Republican	Term-limited, Democratic victory	Charles Brantley Aycock (Democratic) 59.57% Spencer B. Adams (Republican) 40.31% Henry Sheets (Prohibition) 0.11% Scattering 0.00%
North Dakota	Frederick B. Fancher	Republican	Retired, Republican victory	Frank White (Republican) 59.20% Max Wipperman (Democratic) (Note: Wipperman ran under a fusion ticket between the Democrats and the Populist Party) 38.72% Delevan Carlton (Prohibition) 0.97% George F. Poague (Socialist) 0.74% O. G. Major (Populist) 0.37%
Rhode Island (held, 4 April 1900)	Elisha Dyer, Jr.	Republican	[data missing]	William Gregory (Republican) 54.33% Nathan W. Littlefield (Democratic) 35.85% James P. Reid (Socialist Labor) 5.96% Henry B. Metcalf (Prohibition) 3.86%
South Carolina	Miles Benjamin McSweeney	Democratic	Re-elected, 100.00%	(Democratic primary run-off results); Miles Benjamin McSweeney 57.86% James A. Hoyt 42.14%
South Dakota	Andrew E. Lee	Populist	Retired to run for U.S. House, Republican victory	Charles N. Herreid (Republican) 56.31% Burre H. Lien (Democratic) (Note: Lien ran under a fusion ticket between the Democrats and the Populist Party) 41.97% F. J. Carlisle (Prohibition) 1.39% L. E. Stair (Midroad-Populist) 0.33%
Tennessee	Benton McMillin	Democratic	Re-elected, 53.86%	John E. McCall (Republican) 44.29% R. S. Cheves (Prohibition) 1.28% H. J. Mullens (Populist) 0.47% Charles H. Stockwell (Social Democrat) 0.10%
Texas	Joseph D. Sayers	Democratic	Re-elected, 67.56%	R. E. Hanney (Republican) 25.12% T. J. McMinn (Populist) 5.92% G. H. Royal (Socialist Labor) 0.03% Scattering 1.37%
Utah	Heber Manning Wells	Republican	Re-elected, 51.71%	James Henry Moyle (Democratic) 48.29%
Vermont (held, 4 September 1900)	Edward Curtis Smith	Republican	Retired, Republican victory	William W. Stickney (Republican) 72.19% John H. Senter (Democratic) 25.53% Henry C. Barnes (Prohibition) 1.42% James Pirie (Social Democrat) 0.85% Scattering 0.02%
Washington	John Rankin Rogers	Populist (Note: Rogers ran under a fusion ticket between the Democrats and the Populist Party)	Re-elected as a Democrat, 48.86%	John M. Frink (Republican) 46.81% Robert E. Dunlap (Prohibition) 1.97% William C. B. Randolph (Social Democrat) 1.57% William McCormick (Socialist Labor) 0.79%
West Virginia	George W. Atkinson	Republican	Term-limited, Republican victory	Albert B. White (Republican) 53.84% John H. Holt (Democratic) 45.43% Thomas Carskadon (Prohibition) 0.60% H. T. Houston (Populist) 0.14%
Wisconsin	Edward Scofield	Republican	Retired, Republican victory	Robert M. LaFollette (Republican) 59.84% Louis G. Bomrich (Democratic) 36.36% J. Burritt Smith (Prohibition) 2.20% Howard Tuttle (Social Democrat) 1.49% Frank Wilke (Socialist Labor) 0.12% Scattering 0.00%

== See also ==
- 1900 United States elections

== Bibliography ==
- Glashan, Roy R. (1979). American Governors and Gubernatorial Elections, 1775-1978. Meckler Books. ISBN 0-930466-17-9.
- Gubernatorial Elections, 1787-1997. Washington, D.C.: Congressional Quarterly Inc. 1998. ISBN 1-56802-396-0.
- Dubin, Michael J. (2014). United States Gubernatorial Elections, 1861-1911: The Official Results by State and County. Jefferson, North Carolina: McFarland. ISBN 978-0-7864-4722-0.
- The World Almanac and Encyclopedia, 1901. New York, NY: The Press Publishing Co. 1901.
- The Tribune Almanac and Political Register, 1901. New York, NY: The Tribune Association. 1901.
