= 1896 Arkansas gubernatorial election =

- September 7, 1896
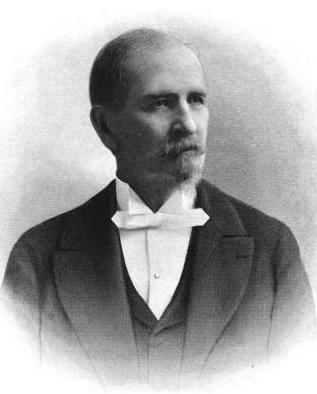

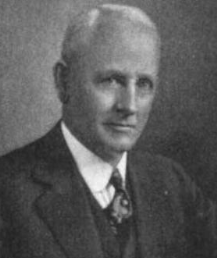

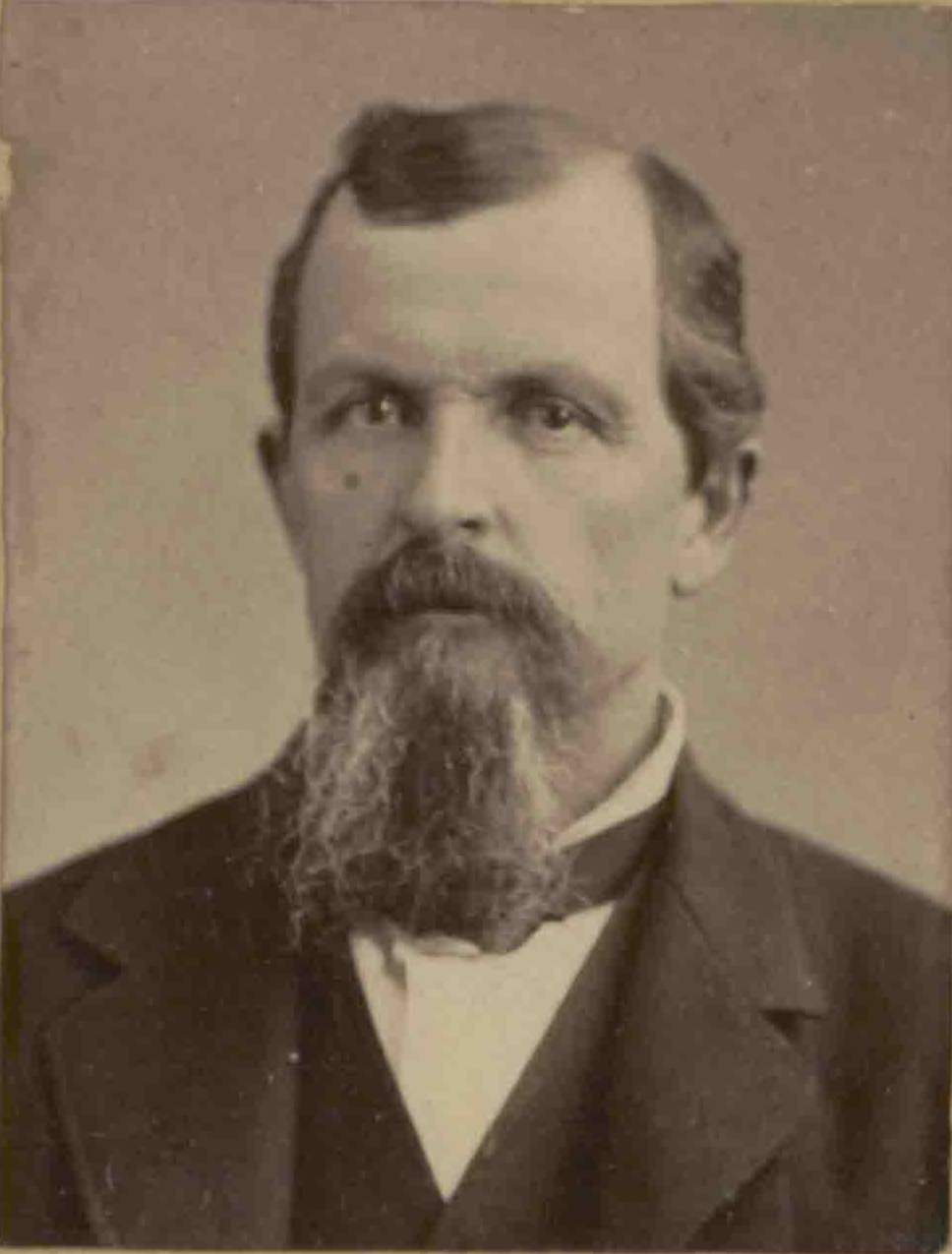
Nominee	Daniel W. Jones	Harmon L. Remmel	Abner W. Files
Party	Democratic	Republican	Populist
Popular vote	91,114	35,836	13,990
Percentage	64.26%	25.27%	9.87%
- County results Jones: 30–40% 40–50% 50–60% 60–70% 70–80% 80–90% Remmel: 50–60% Files: 40–50%
Governor before election
James Paul Clarke
Democratic
Elected Governor
Daniel W. Jones
Democratic

The 1896 Arkansas gubernatorial election was held on September 7, 1896.

Incumbent Democratic Governor James Paul Clarke did not stand for re-election, but instead ran unsuccessfully for the U.S. Senate.

Democratic nominee Daniel W. Jones defeated Republican nominee Harmon L. Remmel and Populist nominee Abner W. Files with 64.26% of the vote.

== General election ==
=== Candidates ===
- Daniel W. Jones, Democratic, former Attorney General of Arkansas
- Harmon L. Remmel, Republican, candidate for Governor in 1894
- Abner W. Files, Populist, former Arkansas State Auditor
- J. W. Miller, Prohibition, candidate for Governor in 1894

=== Results ===
1896 Arkansas gubernatorial election (Note: The various sources give slightly differing votes for the various candidates. The result given here is that given in the Arkansas Senate Journal.)
Party	Candidate	Votes	%	±%
Democratic	Daniel W. Jones	91,114	64.26%	+5.35%
Republican	Harmon L. Remmel	35,836	25.27%	+4.73%
Populist	Abner W. Files	13,990	9.87%	−9.46%
Prohibition	J. W. Miller	851	0.60%	−0.62%
Majority		55,278	38.99%	
Turnout		141,791		
Democratic hold		Swing		
