= 1896 United States elections =

- ← 1894 1895 1896 1897 1898 → Presidential election year
- Election day: November 3
- Incumbent president: ▌Grover Cleveland (D)
- Next Congress: 55th

Presidential election
- Partisan control: Republican gain
- Popular vote margin: Republican +4.3%
- Electoral vote
- William McKinley (R): 271
- William Jennings Bryan (D): 176
- 1896 presidential election results. Red denotes states won by McKinley, blue denotes states won by Bryan. Numbers indicate the electoral votes won by each candidate.

Senate elections
- Overall control: Republican hold
- Seats contested: 30 of 90 seats
- Net seat change: Republican +2
- Results of the elections: Democratic gain Democratic hold Republican gain Republican hold Silver hold Populist gain Populist hold Silver Republican gain Legislature failed to elect

House elections
- Overall control: Republican hold
- Seats contested: All 357 voting members
- Net seat change: Democratic +31

Gubernatorial elections
- Seats contested: 32
- Net seat change: Populist +3
- 1896 gubernatorial election results Democratic gain Democratic hold Republican gain Republican hold Populist gain Populist hold

Elections were held for the 55th United States Congress. The Republicans won control of the presidency and maintained control of both houses of Congress. The election marked the end of the Third Party System and the start of the Fourth Party System, as the Republicans would generally dominate politics until the 1930 elections. Political scientists such as V.O. Key, Jr. argue that this election was a realigning election, while James Reichley argues against this idea on the basis that the Republican victory in this election merely continued the party's post-Civil War dominance. The election took place in the aftermath of the Panic of 1893, and featured a fierce debate between advocates of bimetallism ("free silver") and supporters of the gold standard.

In the presidential election, the Republican former Governor William McKinley of Ohio defeated the Democratic former Representative William Jennings Bryan of Nebraska. McKinley took the Republican nomination on the first ballot, while Bryan took the Democratic nomination on the fifth ballot (at age 36, he became the youngest presidential nominee of a major party), defeating former Missouri Representative Richard P. Bland and several other candidates. Bryan's Cross of Gold speech, in which he advocated for "free silver," helped deliver him the Democratic nomination, and also attracted the support of the Populist Party and the Silver Republican Party. Though Bryan carried most of the Southern United States and the Western United States, McKinley won a comfortable margin in both the electoral college and the popular vote by carrying the Northeastern United States and the Great Lakes region.

Democrats won major gains in the House, but Republicans continued to command a large majority in the chamber. The Populists also won several seats, holding more seats in the House than any third party since the Civil War.

In the Senate, the Republicans maintained their plurality, keeping control of the same number of seats. The Democrats lost several seats, while the Silver Republicans established themselves for the first time with five seats. Republican William P. Frye won election as President pro tempore.

== See also ==
- 1896 United States presidential election
- 1896 United States House of Representatives elections
- 1896–97 United States Senate elections
- 1896 United States gubernatorial elections
