= Harmon L. Remmel =

German-American politician and businessman (1852–1927)

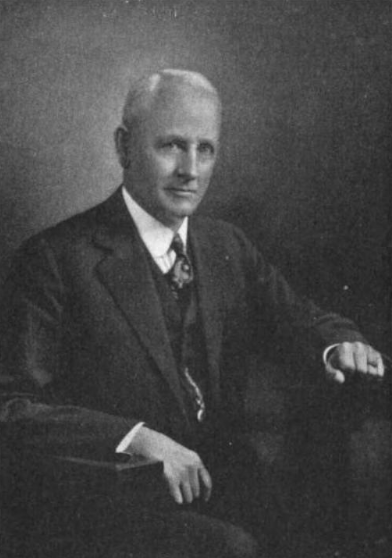
Harmon L. Remmel circa 1922

Harmon Liveright Remmel (January 15, 1852 – October 14, 1927), was a German-American politician and businessman. He led the Arkansas Republican Party from roughly 1913 to his death in 1927.

== Family and early life ==
Remmel's father Gottlieb Remmel (1813–1892), a tanner, and mother Henrietta (Bever) Remmel (1814–1896) were born in Germany; they came to the United States in 1848 to avoid conscription into the army. They came first to New York state, where Harmon was born in 1852 in the rural town of Stratford near the southern edge of the modern Adirondack Park. Remmel attended Fairfield Academy in nearby Fairfield, New York and then taught school for a year. In 1871 he and his older brother Augustus Caleb Remmel (1847–1883) went to Fort Wayne, Indiana and engaged in several enterprises, ending up in the lumber business. From 1874 to 1876 they went to New York City and worked as a representative of their firm there. Finally in 1876 he and his brother set up the Remmel Brothers Lumber Company in Newport, Arkansas, which they operated together until his brother's death in 1883.

== Business career ==
In 1896 Remmel left the lumber business and moved to Little Rock, where he became the Arkansas general manager for the Mutual Life Insurance Company of New York, a post he held until 1922. In 1902 he organized the Mercantile Trust Company, a bank which he led as president until 1912; he then organized another bank, the Banker's Trust, and led that 1914–1923. He was the president of the Arkansas Bankers' Association in 1922.

== Political career ==
As soon as Remmel arrived in Arkansas in 1876 he was elected to the Newport town council, serving two terms. He ran for state representative in Jackson County in 1882, losing to Democrat Wiley M. Baird. In 1884 he was the Republican candidate for United States Representative in Arkansas's 1st congressional district, losing to incumbent Democrat Poindexter Dunn, and also obtained a seat on the Republican state central committee, which he kept until his death in 1927. In 1886 he was elected as a Republican to be a state representative for Jackson County, due in part to the Democratic vote being split by a candidate from the Agricultural Wheel. Starting in 1892 he was a delegate to all the Republican National Conventions through 1924. He was the Republican candidate for governor in 1894, 1896, and 1900, losing to James Paul Clarke, Daniel W. Jones, and Jeff Davis. Remmel became one of the most important lieutenants of former governor and Senator Powell Clayton (1833–1914), the boss of the Arkansas Republican party. In 1895 Clayton arranged for Remmel to be elected president of the Arkansas League of Republican Clubs, displacing a Republican dissident, Asbury Fowler. In 1897 Remmel became the Arkansas representative to the Republican National Club, also called the League of Republican Clubs. He was the chairman of the state Republican central committee from 1900 to 1905, from 1910 to 1916, and from 1921 until his death. In 1913 he succeeded Powell Clayton as Arkansas' representative on the Republican National Committee. In 1916 he was the Republican candidate in a special election to replace United States Senator James P. Clarke, losing to Democrat William F. Kirby.

As a powerful figure in Arkansas Republican politics, Remmel benefited from political patronage on the national level, starting with an appointment as postmaster in Newport in 1877. He held the position of state collector of internal revenue from 1897 to 1902 and from 1921 to his death. He was appointed marshal of the Eastern District of Arkansas in 1903.

As late as 1912, Remmel as a lieutenant of Clayton supported the "black and tan" policy of alliance with black Republicans. After Clayton's death, Remmel became the most powerful figure in the Arkansas Republican party, although his power was not always secure. Remmel's part in the struggle from 1914 on between the "Lily White" faction in the Arkansas Republican Party (led by his nephew A. C. Remmel) and black Republicans was unclear; he didn't clearly favor one side in the conflict, but neither did he block the sidelining of black Republicans. Mostly he favored the continuation of "black and tan", but not at the expense of party unity or his own control of the party.

Remmel suffered a stroke on May 1, 1927, and attempted to recover at a hospital in Hot Springs, Arkansas. His political influence lasted right to the end of his life; one of his few visitors there was Herbert Hoover, whom Remmel subsequently endorsed for president.

== Personal life ==
Remmel was commissioned a lieutenant colonel in the Arkansas state militia and was often referred to as "Colonel".

Remmel married Laura Lee Stafford (1853–1913) in 1878. In 1915 he married Elizabeth Irene Cameron (1878–1926) and adopted her daughter Elizabeth (1915–1960); they had one child together, Harmon Liveright Remmel Jr. (1916–2003).

Remmel is buried in Oakland-Fraternal Cemetery in Little Rock.

== Legacy ==
Remmel organized and promoted the Arkansas Anthracite Coal Company starting in 1905; this vast and ultimately unsuccessful effort to exploit coal deposits in Logan County led to the creation of the city of Scranton, Arkansas.

The first hydroelectric dam in Arkansas was named in his honor due to his help in obtaining a licence.

Remmel Avenue in Newport is named after him and Remmel Park in Newport was given to the city by his family in 1930. The Remmel Apartments in Little Rock were built by Remmel as rental properties in 1917.
