= J. N. Donohoo =

American politician (1853–1917)

Member of the Arkansas House of Representatives from the Phillips County district
- In office January 8, 1877 – January 13, 1879 Serving with Berry Coleman, T. M. Jacks
- In office January 10, 1887 – January 9, 1893 Serving with R. B. Macon, James P. Clarke, S. L. Cook, John H. Carr, George W. Yancey,
- Succeeded by: redistricted

Personal details
- Born: Jacob N. Donohoo; December 16, 1853 Cleveland, Tennessee, U.S.
- Died: November 11, 1917 (aged 63) Helena, Arkansas, U.S.
- Resting place: Magnolia Cemetery, Helena, Arkansas, U.S.
- Citizenship: United States
- Party: Republican
- Children: Nina Donohoo
- Profession: Farmer; banker; politician; grocer; editor; real estate investor

Jacob N. Donohoo (December 16, 1853 – November 11, 1917) was an American state politician and banker in Arkansas. He served several terms in the Arkansas House of Representatives after first winning election in 1876 when he was 22. He helped fundraise for the Masonic Temple in Pine Bluff, part of the Sovereign Grand Lodge of Free and Accepted Masons.

He was born in Cleveland, Tennessee. He moved to Arkansas in 1870. He married and owned a 160-acre farm in Marvell, Arkansas. He was a Republican and a Quaker.

Donohoo also worked as an internal revenue collector and banker. Knoxville, Tennessee commercial artist LaRoy A. Tate was his grandson.

== See also ==
- African American officeholders from the end of the Civil War until before 1900
