= 1894 United States elections =

- ← 1892 1893 1894 1895 1896 → Midterm elections
- Election day: November 6
- Incumbent president: ▌Grover Cleveland (D)
- Next Congress: 54th

Senate elections
- Overall control: Republican gain
- Seats contested: 30 of 88 seats
- Net seat change: Republican +4
- Results of the elections: Democratic hold Republican gain Republican hold Populist gain Legislature failed to elect

House elections
- Overall control: Republican gain
- Seats contested: All 356 voting seats
- Net seat change: Republican +110
- Map of 1894 house races Democratic gain Republican gain Democratic hold Republican hold Populist gain Populist hold Silver hold

Gubernatorial elections
- Seats contested: 28
- Net seat change: Republican +7
- 1894 gubernatorial election results Democratic gain Democratic hold Republican gain Republican hold Populist gain Silver gain

Elections were held on November 6, 1894, and elected the members of the 54th United States Congress. These were mid-term elections during Democratic President Grover Cleveland's second non-consecutive term. The Republican landslide of 1894 marked a realigning election in American politics as the nation moved from the Third Party System that had focused on issues of the American Civil War and the Reconstruction era, and entered the Fourth Party System, known as the Progressive Era, which focused on middle-class reforms.

The Democrats suffered a landslide defeat in the House, losing over 100 seats to the Republicans in the single largest swing in the history of the House. The Democrats also lost four seats in the Senate, thus resulting in the President's party completely losing control of both houses of Congress, the first time this ever happened in a midterm election.

The Democratic Party losses can be traced largely to the Panic of 1893 and the ineffective party leadership of Cleveland. Republicans effectively used the issues of the tariff, bimetallism, and the Cuban War of Independence against Cleveland. The Democrats suffered huge defeats outside the South (almost ninety percent of Northeastern and Midwestern House Democrats lost re-election), and the Democratic Party underwent a major turnover in party leadership. With the defeat of many Bourbon Democrats, William Jennings Bryan took the party in a more populist direction starting with the 1896 elections.

== Federal ==
- 1894 United States House of Representatives elections
- 1894–95 United States Senate elections

== States ==
- 1894 Nebraska gubernatorial election
- 1894 South Carolina gubernatorial election
- 1894 Pennsylvania gubernatorial election

== See also ==
- 1892 United States presidential election
- 1892 United States House of Representatives elections
- 1892–93 United States Senate elections
