= Barry Coleman =

American politician

Barry Coleman, sometimes written Berry Coleman, was a state legislator in Arkansas. He and J. N. Donohoo represented Phillips County, Arkansas in the Arkansas House of Representatives.

He served in 1874–1875 and 1877 representing Phillips County, Arkansas. He was a Republican.

== See also ==
- African American officeholders from the end of the Civil War until before 1900
