= 1900 United States elections =

- ← 1898 1899 1900 1901 1902 → Presidential election year
- Election day: November 6
- Incumbent president: ▌William McKinley (R)
- Next Congress: 57th

Presidential election
- Partisan control: Republican hold
- Popular vote margin: Republican +6.1%
- Electoral vote
- William McKinley (R): 292
- William Jennings Bryan (D): 155
- 1900 presidential election results. Red denotes states won by McKinley, blue denotes states won by Bryan. Numbers indicate the electoral votes won by each candidate.

Senate elections
- Overall control: Republican hold
- Seats contested: 30 of 90 seats
- Net seat change: Democratic +2
- Results of the elections: Democratic gain Democratic hold Republican gain Republican hold Silver Republican gain Silver Republican hold Legislature failed to elect

House elections
- Overall control: Republican hold
- Seats contested: All 357 voting members
- Net seat change: Republican +13

Gubernatorial elections
- Seats contested: 34
- Net seat change: Republican +3
- 1900 gubernatorial election results Democratic gain Democratic hold Republican gain Republican hold

Elections were held for the 57th United States Congress. The election was held during the Fourth Party System. The Republicans retained control of the presidency and both houses of Congress, while the third parties suffered defeats.

In a re-match of the 1896 presidential election, the Republican President William McKinley defeated Democratic former Representative William Jennings Bryan of Nebraska. McKinley's previous running mate, Vice President Garret Hobart, had died in office, so the Republicans nominated New York Governor Theodore Roosevelt as their vice presidential candidate. McKinley again won by a comfortable margin in both the popular vote and the electoral college, and he picked up a handful of states in the Western United States and the Midwestern United States. McKinley's win made him the first sitting president to win re-election since Ulysses S. Grant in 1872.

Republicans won minor gains in the House, maintaining their majority.

In the Senate, the Democrats made moderate gains while the Populist Party lost three seats. Republicans continued to maintain a commanding majority in the chamber.

== See also ==
- 1900 United States presidential election
- 1900 United States House of Representatives elections
- 1900–01 United States Senate elections
