= 1898 Arkansas gubernatorial election =

- September 5, 1898
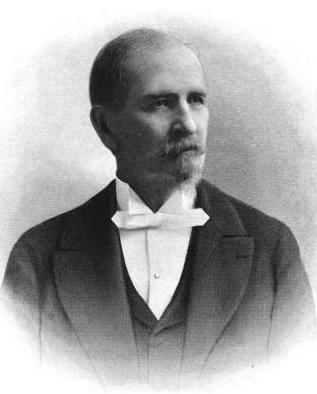

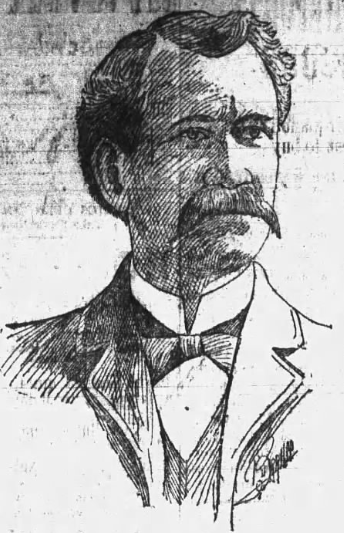

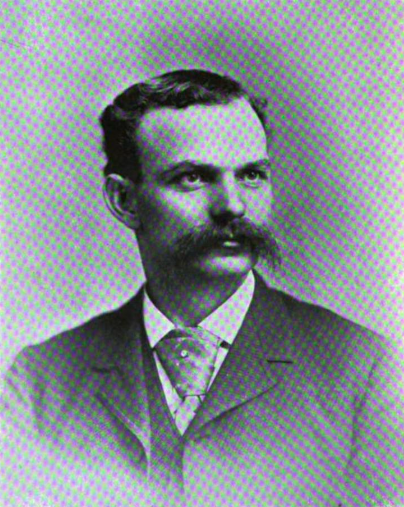
Nominee	Daniel W. Jones	Henry F. Auten	W. Scott Morgan
Party	Democratic	Republican	Populist
Popular vote	75,354	27,524	8,332
Percentage	67.35%	24.60%	7.45%
- County results Jones: 40–50% 50–60% 60–70% 70–80% 80–90% 90–100% Auten: 50–60%
Governor before election
Daniel W. Jones
Democratic
Elected Governor
Daniel W. Jones
Democratic

The 1898 Arkansas gubernatorial election was held on September 5, 1898. Incumbent Democratic Governor Daniel W. Jones defeated Republican nominee Henry F. Auten and Populist nominee W. Scott Morgan with 67.35% of the vote.

== General election ==
=== Candidates ===
- Daniel W. Jones, Democratic, incumbent Governor of Arkansas
- Henry Franklin Auten, Republican, lawyer
- Winfield Scott Morgan, Populist, newspaper editor
- Alexander McKnight, Prohibition (Note: Contemporary sources state that McKnight was the Liberty Party nominee.)

=== Results ===
1898 Arkansas gubernatorial election (Note: Some sources, including the Arkansas Senate Journal, give Jones' vote as 75,362.)
Party	Candidate	Votes	%	±%
Democratic	Daniel W. Jones (incumbent)	75,354	67.35%	+3.09%
Republican	Henry F. Auten	27,524	24.60%	−0.67%
Populist	W. Scott Morgan	8,332	7.45%	−2.42%
Prohibition	Alexander McKnight	679	0.61%	+0.01%
Majority		47,830	42.75%	
Turnout		111,889		
Democratic hold		Swing		
