= Remmel Apartments =

- U.S. National Register of Historic Places
- U.S. Historic district – Contributing property
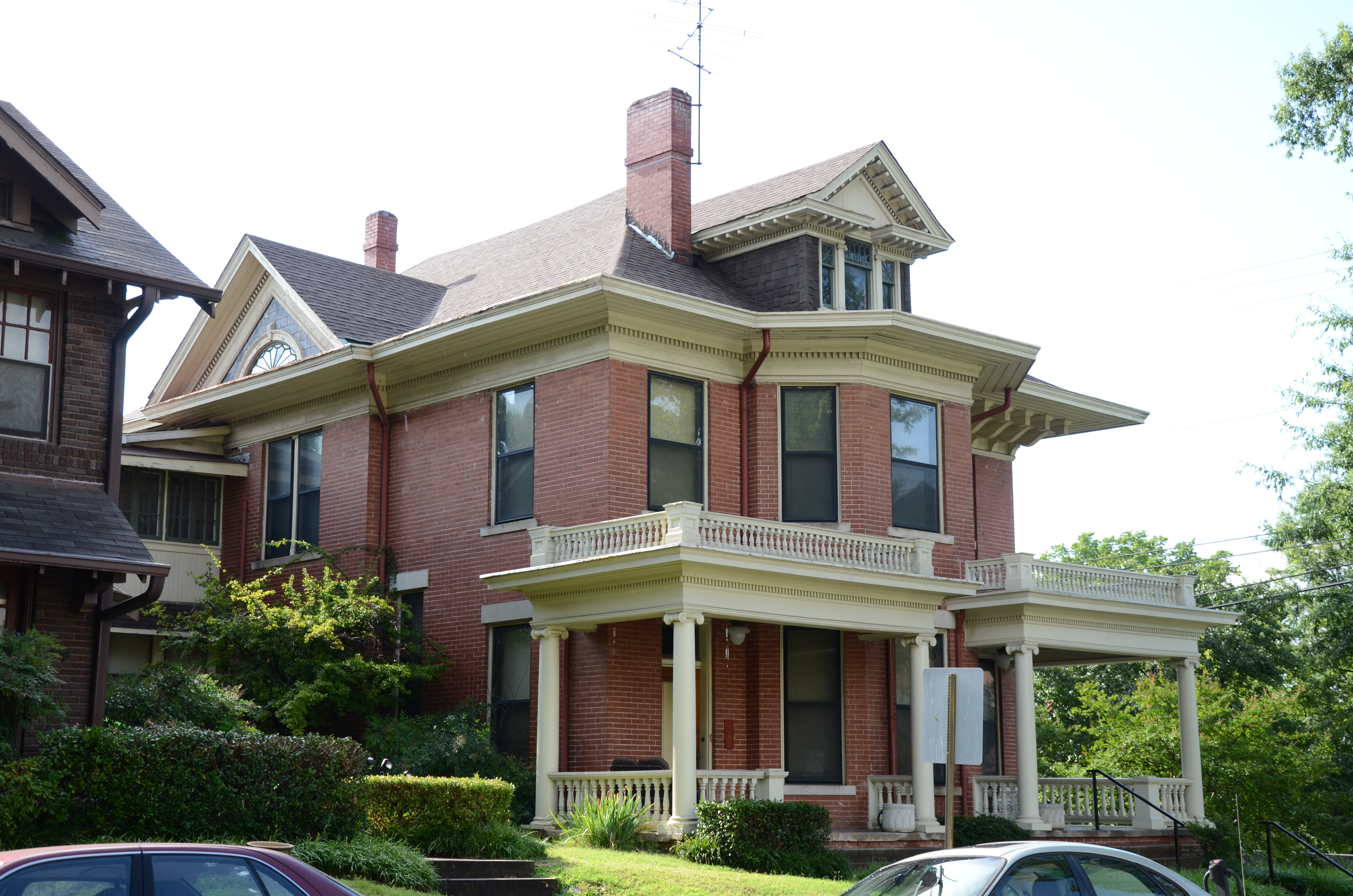

- Location within Arkansas Location within the United States
- Location: 1700-1710 S. Spring St., 409-411 W. 17th St., Little Rock, Arkansas
- Coordinates: 34°43′58″N 92°16′40″W
- Built: 1917
- Architect: Thompson & Harding, Charles L. Thompson
- Architectural style: Bungalow/Craftsman (three); Colonial Revival (Flats one)
- Part of: Governor's Mansion Historic District (ID78000620)
- MPS: Thompson, Charles L., Design Collection TR
- NRHP reference No.: 82000917, 82000918, 82000919, 82000920

Significant dates
- Added to NRHP: December 22, 1982
- Designated CP: September 13, 1978

Remmel Apartments and Remmel Flats are four architecturally distinguished multiunit residential buildings in Little Rock, Arkansas. Located at 1700-1710 South Spring Street (even numbers) and 409-411 West 17th Street, they were all designed by noted Arkansas architect Charles L. Thompson for H.L. Remmel as rental properties. The three Remmel Apartments were built in 1917 in the Craftsman style, while Remmel Flats is a Colonial Revival structure built in 1906. All four buildings are individually listed on the National Register of Historic Places, and are contributing elements of the Governor's Mansion Historic District.

== Remmel Flats ==
Remmel Flats is located at 1700-02 South Spring Street. It is a sophisticated variant of an American Foursquare, with Colonial Revival massing and detailing on its two porches. Dormers projecting from the hip roof have deep pedimented gables with dentil moulding and modillions.

== 1704-06 South Spring Street ==
The building at 1704-06 South Spring Street has a deep front porch, supported by large stone piers that rise 1 1/2 stories. It is two stories in height, and faced in dark brown brick. The front porch facade, and a similar cross-gable projecting from the side of the main roof, both are decorated with pseudo half-timbered stucco.

== 1708-10 South Spring Street ==
The building at 1708-10 South Spring Street is also two stories, with a hip roof and an irregular facade. Its prominent features are two gables, one projecting from the roof, the other over the porch, which are decorated with half-timbered stucco. The porch is open, with oversized plain round columns supporting the roof.

== 409-11 West 17th Street ==
This building is the one most resembling a typical apartment house of the four. It has a boxy two-story shape, with a steeply pitched roof with flared edges. The east entry is sheltered by a recessed porch with large Craftsman brackets and a stuccoed half-timber front, and the west entry is in a projecting section whose roof is a continuation of the main roof.

== See also ==
- National Register of Historic Places listings in Little Rock, Arkansas
- Remmel Dam, Jones Mill, AR, also NRHP-listed
