= Oakland-Fraternal Cemetery =

Historic cemetery in Arkansas, United States

- U.S. National Register of Historic Places
- U.S. Historic district
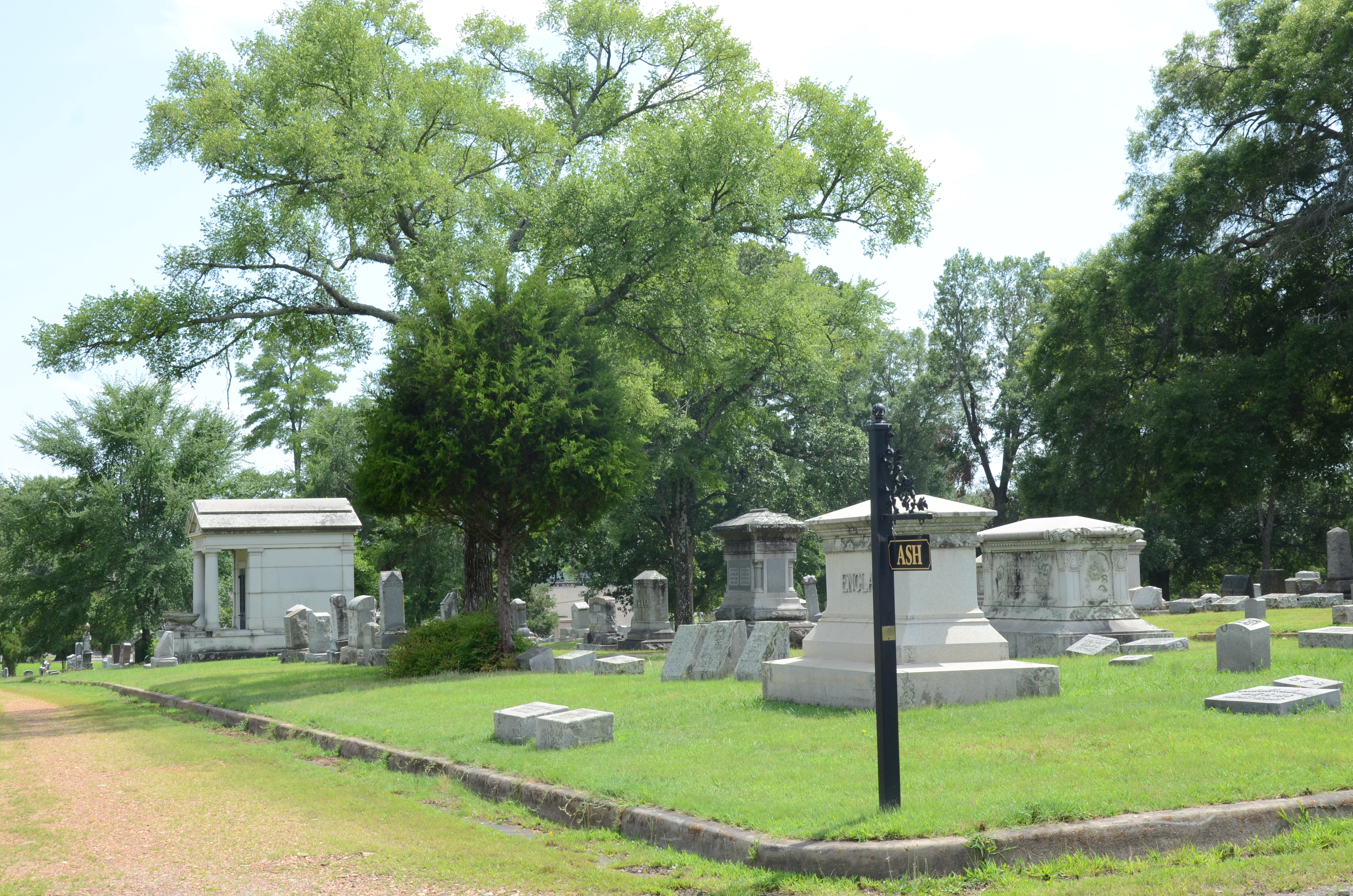

- Location within Arkansas Location within the United States
- Location: 2101 Barber St., Little Rock, Arkansas
- Coordinates: 34°43′43″N 92°15′40″W
- Area: 92 acres (37 ha)
- Built: 1863
- Architect: Tunnah, Funston, Viquesney, Monhan, Steinert
- Architectural style: Mid 19th Century Revival, Late Victorian, Egyptian revival
- NRHP reference No.: 09001258
- Added to NRHP: April 20, 2010

The Oakland–Fraternal Cemetery is a historic cemetery on Barber Street in Little Rock, Arkansas. It actually consists of six originally separate cemeteries, and lies adjacent to the Little Rock National Cemetery, of which it was once a part. Portions of the cemetery are dedicated to Confederate war dead, and its grounds include two separate Jewish cemeteries, and the Fraternal Cemetery. The Fraternal side, established by the Grand United Order of Odd Fellows, was a burying ground for African Americans. The combined cemetery, listed on the National Register of Historic Places in 2010, continues in active use.

== Notable burials ==
- Author Bernie Babcock (1868–1962)
- Civil War Union officer Henry C. Caldwell (1832–1915)
- Arkansas Governor James P. Clarke (1854–1916)
- Freeman W. Compton (1824-1893), lawyer and state supreme court judge
- Author and temperance reformer Mary A. Cornelius (1829-1918)
- Historian and clubwoman Kate Embry Dowdle Davis (1871–1954)
- Arkansas Secretary of State Jacob Frolich (1837-1890)
- Journalist and civil rights advocate Mifflin W. Gibbs (1823–1915) – Fraternal side
- Pulitzer Prize journalist Paul Greenburg (1937–2021)
- Arkansas Governor Daniel W. Jones (1839–1918)
- US Senator William M. Kavanaugh (1866–1915)
- Civil War Medal of Honor recipient John Kennedy (1834–1910)
- US Congressman Charles C. Reid (1868–1922)
- Republican party boss Harmon L. Remmel (1852–1927)
- Civil War Confederate general John S. Roane (1817–1867)
- US Congressman Logan H. Roots (1841–1893)
- MLB player Jimmy Zinn (1895–1991)

== See also ==
- National Register of Historic Places listings in Little Rock, Arkansas
