= Mary A. Cornelius =

American writer and temperance reformer (1829–1918)

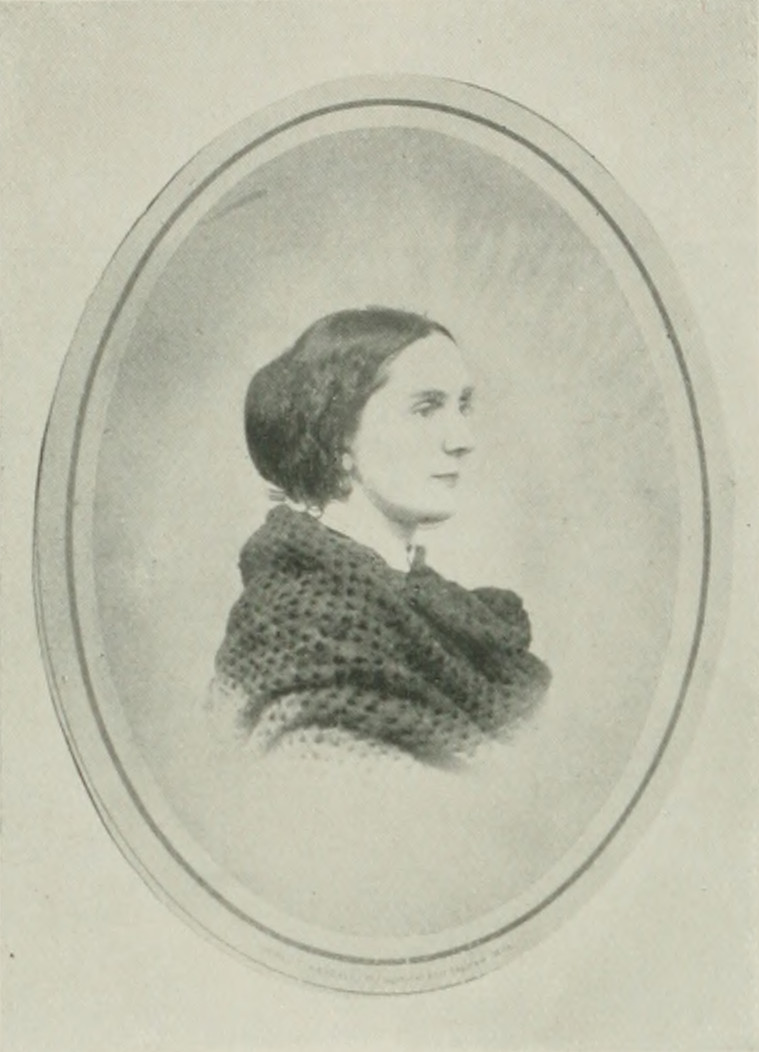
- Portrait from A Woman of the Century
- Born: Mary Ann Mann; September 25, 1829 Pontiac, Michigan, U.S.
- Died: April 18, 1918 (aged 88) Chicago, Illinois, U.S.
- Resting place: Oakland-Fraternal Cemetery
- Occupation: writer; social reformer
- Genre: novels, occult
- Subject: temperance; tolerance; God's love for the world
- Literary movement: temperance
- Notable works: Little Wolf
- Spouse: Samuel Cornelius (m. 1850; died 1886)

Mary Ann Mann Cornelius (née, Mann; pen name, Mrs. Mary A. Cornelius; September 25, 1829 – April 18, 1918) was an American writer and social reformer. A temperance activist, she served as president of the Woman's Christian Temperance Union (W.C.T.U.) of Arkansas. She lived several years in Tacoma, Washington, where she established a free reading room and circulating library for the young. In Tacoma and also in Topeka, Kansas, Cornelius served as a director of the humane society. She was the author of various novels and occult stories, including Little Wolf; Uncle Nathan's Farm; The White Flame; and Why? or A Kansas Girl's Query. She favored woman's suffrage.

== Early life and education ==
Mary Ann Mann was born in Pontiac, Michigan, on September 25, 1829. Her parents were Lewis Whiting Mann (1802-1889) and Elvira (Bagley) Mann (1810-1867). Both of her parents were of Pilgrims ancestry and New England origin. Cornelius' siblings were Anna (b. 1827), Sarah (b. 1832), Preston (b. 1834), Louie (b. 1838), Evelina (b. 1842), and Lewis (b. 1852).

She was educated at the Pontiac Academy. Her first school composition, written when she was nine years of age, was a hit in the rural community where she lived and was printed in the local newspaper.

== Career ==
Her husband encouraged her to write short articles for the press on religious and philanthropic subjects, even with the responsibilities of motherhood and her position as a pastor's wife upon her. But when she brought to his notice a story she had written of 39 long chapters, he protested against it.

Although a semi-invalid for many years, she was involved in Christian and philanthropic enterprises. Cornelius' first public efforts were in aid of her husband's occupation as a clergyman. So many desperate women in the church confided to her their troubles with drinking husbands and sons that Cornelius became interested in the temperance cause, joining the W.C.T.U. In 1885, she was elected president of the state W.C.T.U. She led the first canvass by petitions for closing the saloons in Little Rock, Arkansas under the three-mile law. The canvass was a bitter one and even threats were made to kill Cornelius if she continued the work. When the papers were ready for presentation to the judge of the court, an attempt was made to steal the petition, but Cornelius set herself to the task of making friends with the perpetrators for the cause of temperance even making the leader a life-long friend.

She assisted her husband when he was engaged in editorial work. About the time of his death, in 1886, she edited a journal in the interest of the temperance society. Her poems, numerous prose articles, and voluminous newspaper correspondence testified to her writing career. Perhaps the best known of her writings were Little Wolf, which has had a wide sale, and the poem, "Sweet Marie".

By 1893, Cornelius removed from Arkansas to Topeka, Kansas that she might have the benefit of woman's suffrage in her temperance work. While there, she learned of the Keeley Treatment and having investigated its results, she was assisted by some of the leading women of the city to organize a Woman's Keeley Rescue League. Its object was to assist indigent inebriates to stop drinking.

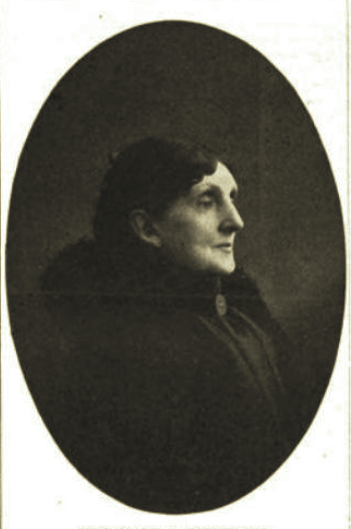
Mary A. Cornelius (The Banner of Gold, 1912)

Still later, Cornelius removed to Tacoma, Washington, carrying the temperance message by means of the Keeley Treatment. Realizing that prevention was better than cure, she established a free reading room for boys, which became a favorite place for many of the men and women in the neighborhood. It contained books of every description, from the novel to the work of science, history and romance, humor and pathos. The shelves along the walls were loaded with books and more books were placed on tables; there were books everywhere. Some of them were new and some were soiled, worn, torn, mutilated, damaged, and dog-eared to such an extent that it did not seem possible that they could be read without falling to pieces. Many of the books had been discarded by the public library as too worn for further service, and patched up and repaired by Cornelius for her reading room. In addition to the books, there were papers, magazines, and games. Cornelius' unique reading room provided entertainment and instruction for scores of boys and young men who were eager for advancement, but whose lives provided few advantages. It was a veritable club, where members could find recreation and improvement, and gain wisdom and courage for the responsibilities of life.

Cornelius wrote four books: the first, Little Wolf, in the interest of temperance; the second, Uncle Nathan's Farm, to promote tolerance; the third, The White Flame, to emphasize God's love for the world. The fourth was dedicated to the young people who frequented the reading room.

== Personal life and death ==
In 1850, she married Rev. Samuel Cornelius Jr., D.D. (1825-1886), of Alexandria, Virginia. He was at one time pastor of the First Baptist Church in Little Rock, Arkansas. They had one child, a son, William S. Cornelius (1853-1894).

Cornelius suffered a severe injury from a fall in October 1911, which confined her to her room for many weeks. During that time, she wrote the poem, "The Watchword".

Mary A. Cornelius died on April 18, 1918, in Chicago. Burial was at Oakland cemetery in Little Rock, Arkansas.

== Selected works ==
The white flame (an occult story)

=== Books as Mary A. Cornelius ===
- The White Flame, 1900 (text)
- Why? Or, A Kansas Girl's Query, 1903 (text)

=== Books as Mrs. M. A. Cornelius ===
- Little Wolf: A Tale of the Western Frontier, 1872 (text)
- Uncle Nathan's Farm: A Novel, 1898

=== Poems ===
- "Sweet Marie"
- "The Watchword", 1911
