= 1894 Arkansas gubernatorial election =

- September 3, 1894
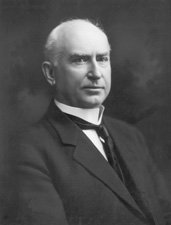

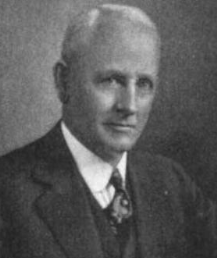

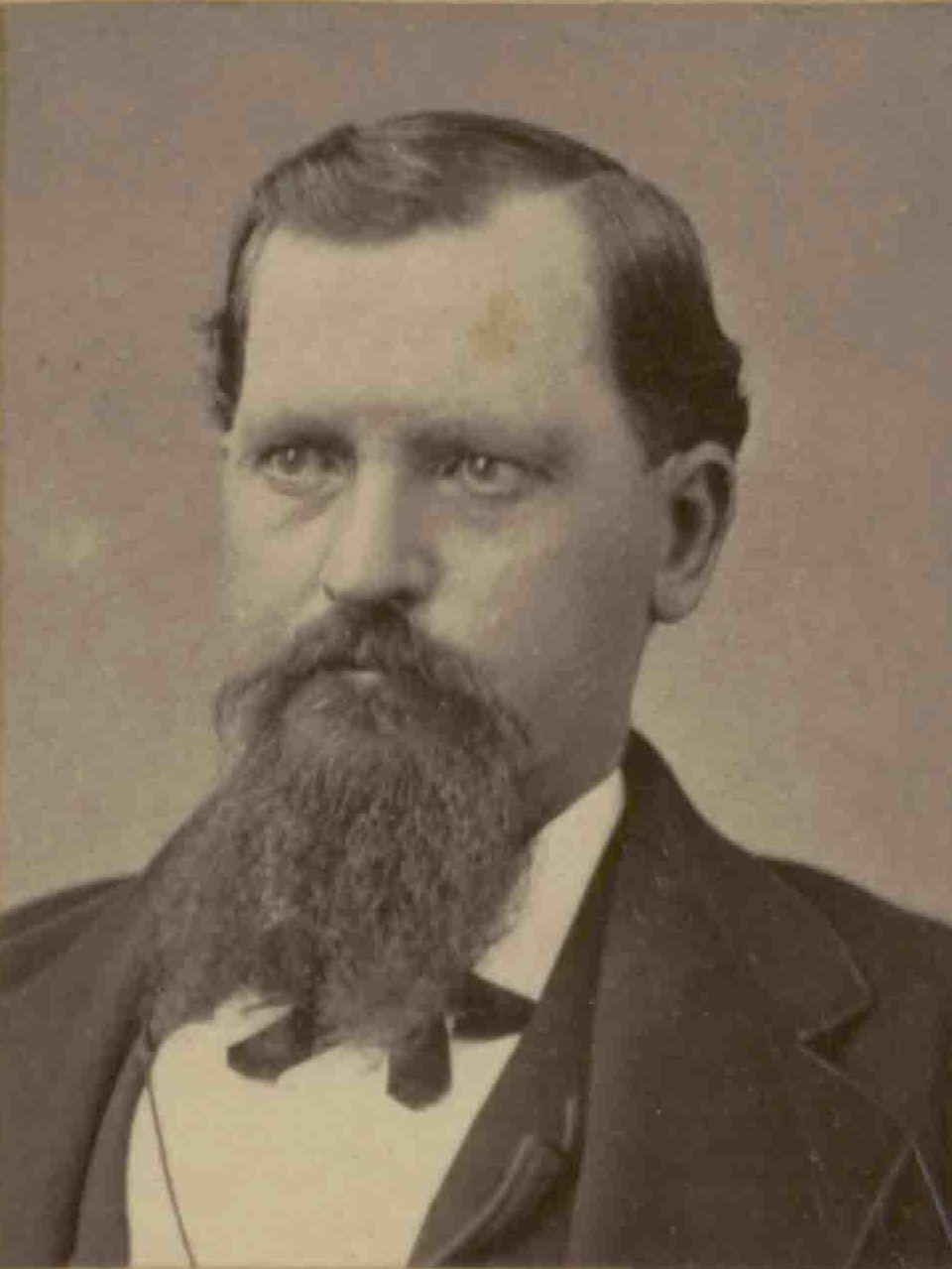
Nominee	James Paul Clarke	Harmon L. Remmel	David E. Barker
Party	Democratic	Republican	Populist
Popular vote	74,809	26,085	24,541
Percentage	58.91%	20.54%	19.33%
- County results Clarke: 40–50% 50–60% 60–70% 70–80% 80–90% 90–100% Remmel: 40–50% 50–60% Barker: 40–50%
Governor before election
William Meade Fishback
Democratic
Elected Governor
James Paul Clarke
Democratic

The 1894 Arkansas gubernatorial election was held on September 3, 1894.

Incumbent Democratic Governor William Meade Fishback did not stand for re-election.

Democratic nominee James Paul Clarke defeated Republican nominee Harmon L. Remmel and Populist nominee David E. Barker with 58.91% of the vote.

== General election ==
=== Candidates ===
- James Paul Clarke, Democratic, incumbent Attorney General of Arkansas
- Harmon L. Remmel, Republican, former member of the Arkansas House of Representatives
- David E. Barker, Populist, former President pro tempore of the Arkansas Senate
- Joseph W. Miller, Prohibition

=== Results ===
1894 Arkansas gubernatorial election (Note: Most 20th Century sources give Barker's vote as 24,181.)
Party	Candidate	Votes	%	±%
Democratic	James Paul Clarke	74,809	58.91%	+1.21%
Republican	Harmon L. Remmel	26,085	20.54%	−1.00%
Populist	David E. Barker	24,541	19.33%	−0.59%
Prohibition	Joseph W. Miller	1,551	1.22%	+0.38%
Majority		48,724	38.37%	
Turnout		126,986		
Democratic hold		Swing		
