= David E. Barker =

American plantation owner and politician (1836–1914)

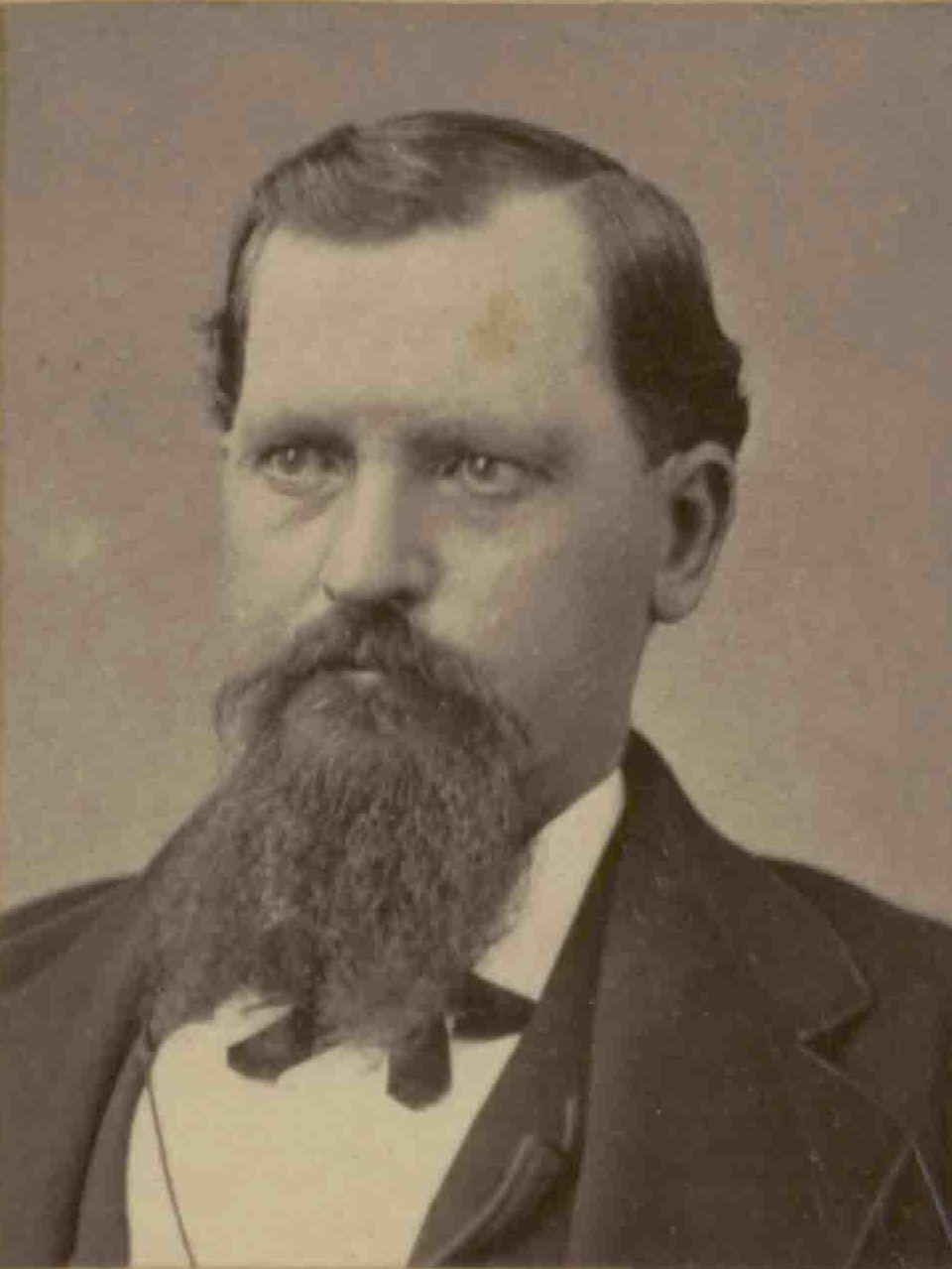
Official portrait, c. 1881

David E. Barker (July 8, 1836 – December 1914) was an American plantation owner and politician. He served in the Arkansas Senate including as President of the Arkansas Senate.

== Biography ==
He was born on July 8, 1836, in Tennessee. He lived in Monticello, Arkansas. He served in the Confederate Army during the American Civil War and was wounded. Thomas Whitington, who served in the Arkansas Senate, was one of his commanders during the Civil War.

After the Civil War, he served in the state legislature from 1879–1881. In 1885, he served in the Arkansas House of Representatives for Drew County, Arkansas. In 1887, he served as President of the Arkansas Senate. He ran for governor.

Cornelius Winn Barker was his younger brother. David Barker never married. He was a member of the Freemasons, Odd Fellows, and belonged to the Missionary Baptist church. He died in December 1914.
