= William F. Kirby =

American politician (1867–1934)

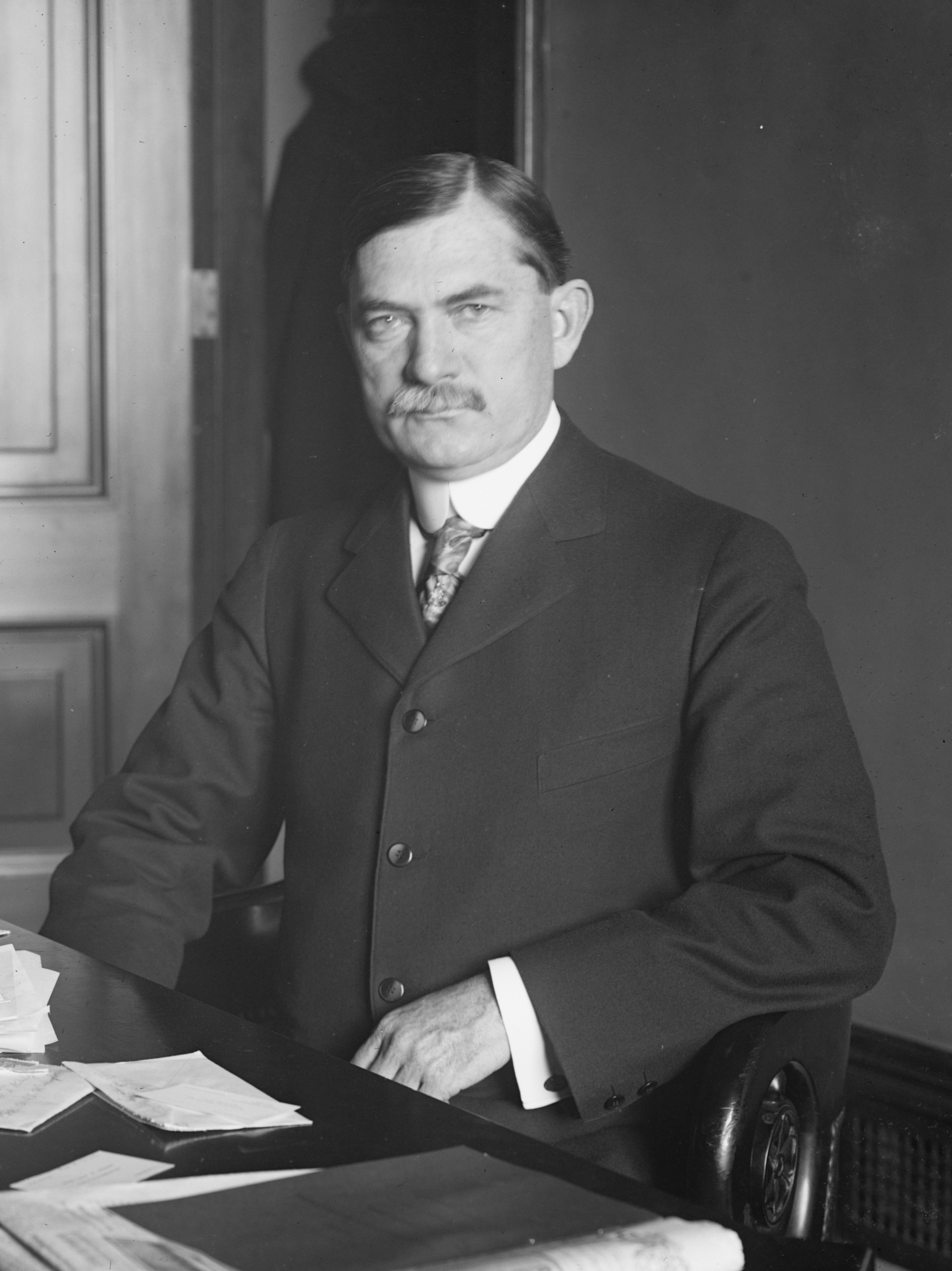
- Kirby, 1916–1917

United States Senator from Arkansas
- In office November 8, 1916 – March 3, 1921
- Preceded by: James P. Clarke
- Succeeded by: Thaddeus H. Caraway

Attorney General of Arkansas
- In office 1907–1909
- Governor: Xenophon O. Pindall
- Preceded by: Robert L. Rogers
- Succeeded by: Hal L. Norwood

Member of the Arkansas State Senate
- In office 1899–1901

Member of the Arkansas House of Representatives
- In office 1893; 1897

Personal details
- Born: William Fosgate Kirby; November 16, 1867 Texarkana, Arkansas
- Died: July 26, 1934 (aged 66) Little Rock, Arkansas
- Party: Democratic

William Fosgate Kirby (November 16, 1867 – July 26, 1934) was a Democratic Party politician from Arkansas who represented the state in the U.S. Senate from 1916 to 1921. He also served in the Arkansas House of Representatives and Arkansas Senate.

Kirby was born in Miller County, Arkansas, near Texarkana, on November 16, 1867, and attended common schools. He studied law at Cumberland School of Law at Cumberland University, graduating in 1885, in which year he was admitted to the bar and began practice in Texarkana.

A member of the state House of Representatives in 1893 and again in 1897, Kirby served in the state senate from 1899 to 1901. In 1904, he wrote Kirby's Digest of the Statutes of Arkansas; in 1907, he moved to Little Rock. He was the state's attorney general from 1907 to 1909 and was elected associate justice of the Arkansas Supreme Court, serving from 1910 to 1916.

He resigned upon his election to the Senate to serve out the term of James P. Clarke, who had died in office. As a senator, Kirby chaired the Committee on Expenditures in the Department of Agriculture and served on the Committee on Patents. An unsuccessful candidate for renomination in 1920 and again in 1932, he resumed his law practice upon leaving the Senate. He again became an associate justice of the state supreme court, serving from 1926 until his death; he died in Little Rock on July 26, 1934, and is buried in Texarkana.

== See also ==
- List of United States senators from Arkansas

Party political offices
Preceded by James Paul Clarke	Democratic nominee for U.S. Senator from Arkansas (Class 3); 1916	Succeeded by Thaddeus H. Caraway
Legal offices
Preceded by Robert L. Rogers	Attorney General of Arkansas; 1907–1909	Succeeded by Hal L. Norwood
U.S. Senate
Preceded by James P. Clarke	Senator from Arkansas (Class 3); 1916–1921; Served alongside: Joseph Taylor Robinson	Succeeded by Thaddeus H. Caraway
