= 1900 Wisconsin gubernatorial election =

- November 6, 1900
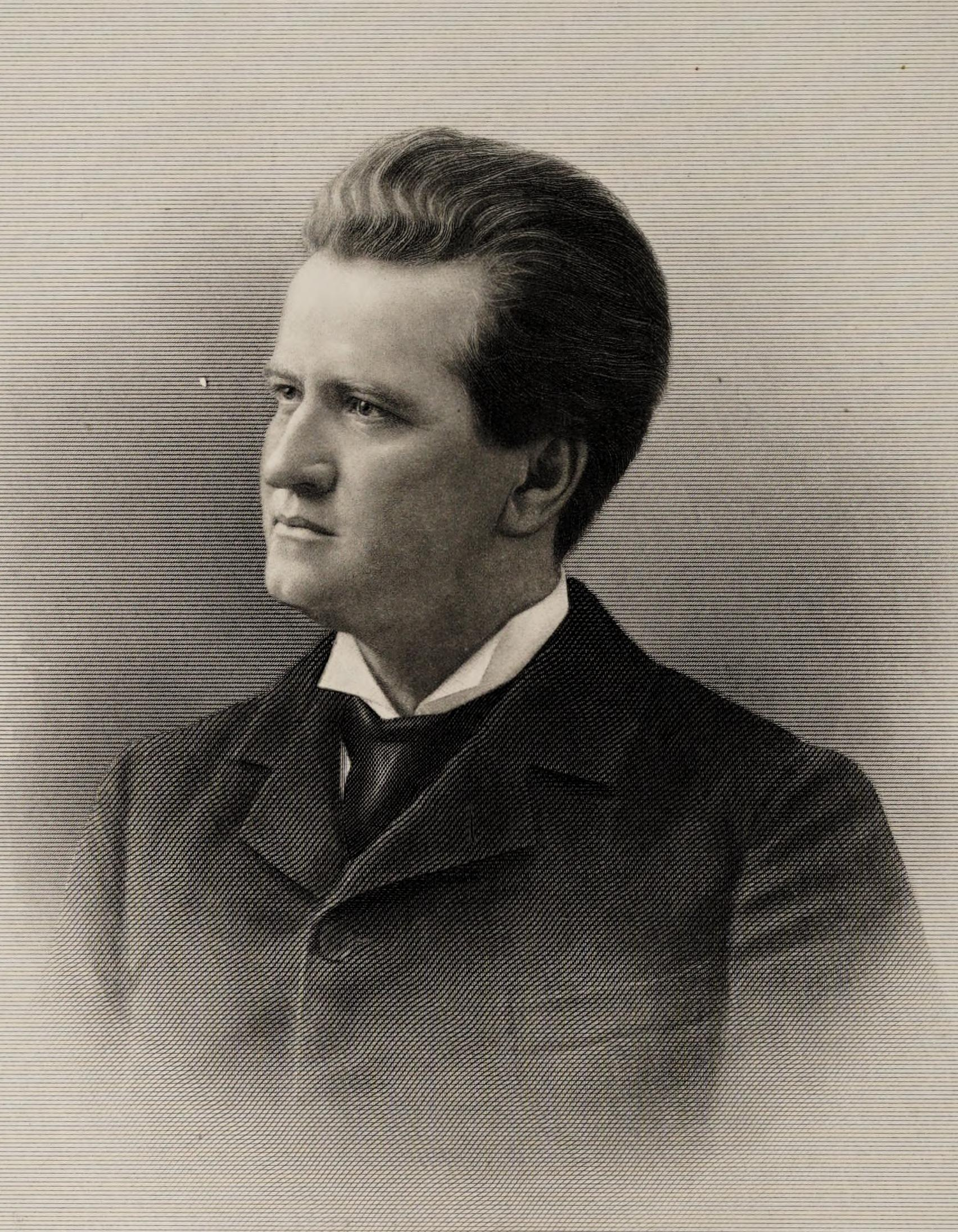

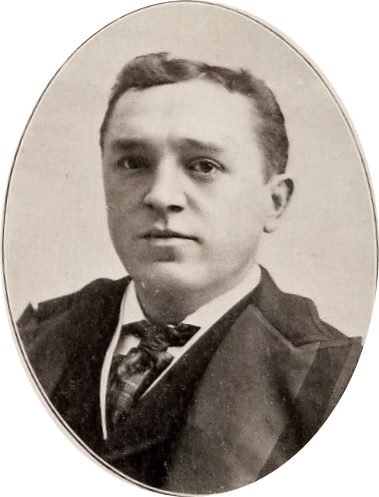
| Nominee | Robert M. La Follette | Louis G. Bohmrich |
| Party | Republican | Democratic |
| Popular vote | 264,419 | 160,674 |
| Percentage | 59.84% | 36.36% |
- County results La Follette : 40–50% 50–60% 60–70% 70–80% 80–90% Bomrich : 40–50% 50–60% 60–70%
Governor before election
Edward Scofield
Republican
Elected Governor
Robert M. La Follette
Republican

The 1900 Wisconsin gubernatorial election was held on November 6, 1900.

Republican nominee Robert M. La Follette defeated Democratic nominee Louis G. Bohmrich with 59.83% of the vote.

== General election ==
=== Candidates ===
Major party candidates

- Louis G. Bohmrich, Democratic, lawyer
- Robert M. La Follette, Republican, former U.S. Congressman

Other candidates

- Jabez Burritt Smith, Prohibition, lawyer, candidate for Wisconsin State Senate in 1896
- Howard Tuttle, Social Democrat, candidate for Governor in 1898
- Frank R. Wilke, Socialist Labor, pressman

=== Results ===
1900 Wisconsin gubernatorial election (Note: One must exercise caution using the Blue Book as a source for Wisconsin election data for the period of 1890-1920 as it was unreliable during this period.)
| Party | Candidate | Votes | % | ±% |
|---|---|---|---|---|
| Republican | Robert M. La Follette | 264,419 | 59.84% | +7.28% |
| Democratic | Louis G. Bohmrich | 160,674 | 36.36% | −4.73% |
| Prohibition | J. Burritt Smith | 9,707 | 2.20% | −0.26% |
| Social Democratic | Howard Tuttle | 6,590 | 1.49% | 0.72% |
| Socialist Labor | Frank R. Wilke | 509 (Note: The 1901 Blue Book mistakenly gives this total as 507) | 0.12% | −0.33% |
| | Scattering | 1 (Note: The 1901 Blue Book mistakenly gives this total as 88. The Scattering votes listed by the Blue Book in Jefferson and Pierce counties were actually votes for Wilke and the 85 votes listed in Kenosha County, which were probably "Blank", are not listed on the original canvass.) | 0.00% | |
| Majority | | 103,745 | 23.48% | |
| Total votes | | 441,900 | 100.00% | |
| Republican hold | | Swing | +12.01% | |

=== Results by county ===
| County | Robert M. La Follette Republican | | Louis G. Bohmrich Democratic | | J. Burritt Smith Prohibition | | Howard Tuttle Social Democratic | | Frank R. Wilke Socialist Labor | | Margin | | Total votes cast |
| County | # | % | # | % | # | % | # | % | # | % | # | % | Total votes cast |
|---|---|---|---|---|---|---|---|---|---|---|---|---|---|
| Adams | 1,529 | 78.05% | 401 | 20.47% | 26 | 1.33% | 3 | 0.15% | 0 | 0.00% | 1,128 | 57.58% | 1,959 |
| Ashland | 2,958 | 62.51% | 1,639 | 34.64% | 105 | 2.22% | 24 | 0.51% | 6 | 0.13% | 1,319 | 27.87% | 4,732 |
| Barron | 2,977 | 73.14% | 939 | 23.07% | 151 | 3.71% | 2 | 0.05% | 1 | 0.02% | 2,038 | 50.07% | 4,070 |
| Bayfield | 2,416 | 76.89% | 629 | 20.02% | 81 | 2.58% | 7 | 0.22% | 9 | 0.29% | 1,787 | 56.87% | 3,142 |
| Brown | 4,832 | 55.90% | 3,664 | 42.39% | 123 | 1.42% | 23 | 0.27% | 2 | 0.02% | 1,168 | 13.51% | 8,644 |
| Buffalo | 2,074 | 61.95% | 1,223 | 36.53% | 50 | 1.49% | 0 | 0.00% | 1 | 0.03% | 851 | 25.42% | 3,348 |
| Burnett | 1,133 | 81.22% | 195 | 13.98% | 53 | 3.80% | 5 | 0.36% | 9 | 0.65% | 938 | 67.24% | 1,395 |
| Calumet | 1,594 | 44.11% | 1,939 | 53.65% | 56 | 1.55% | 21 | 0.58% | 4 | 0.11% | -345 | -9.55% | 3,614 |
| Chippewa | 4,189 | 61.58% | 2,457 | 36.12% | 142 | 2.09% | 11 | 0.16% | 3 | 0.04% | 1,732 | 25.46% | 6,802 |
| Clark | 3,829 | 74.31% | 1,178 | 22.86% | 127 | 2.46% | 13 | 0.25% | 6 | 0.12% | 2,651 | 51.45% | 5,153 |
| Columbia | 4,803 | 66.44% | 2,139 | 29.59% | 267 | 3.69% | 18 | 0.25% | 2 | 0.03% | 2,664 | 36.85% | 7,229 |
| Crawford | 2,332 | 62.47% | 1,354 | 36.27% | 45 | 1.21% | 1 | 0.03% | 1 | 0.03% | 978 | 26.20% | 3,733 |
| Dane | 9,837 | 61.20% | 5,750 | 35.77% | 465 | 2.89% | 18 | 0.11% | 3 | 0.02% | 4,087 | 25.43% | 16,073 |
| Dodge | 4,735 | 43.86% | 5,882 | 54.49% | 170 | 1.57% | 6 | 0.06% | 2 | 0.02% | -1,147 | -10.63% | 10,795 |
| Door | 2,363 | 76.77% | 659 | 21.41% | 54 | 1.75% | 2 | 0.06% | 0 | 0.00% | 1,704 | 55.36% | 3,078 |
| Douglas | 4,410 | 64.44% | 2,156 | 31.50% | 167 | 2.44% | 94 | 1.37% | 17 | 0.25% | 2,254 | 32.93% | 6,844 |
| Dunn | 3,061 | 70.53% | 1,138 | 26.22% | 137 | 3.16% | 3 | 0.07% | 1 | 0.02% | 1,923 | 44.31% | 4,340 |
| Eau Claire | 4,218 | 64.25% | 2,110 | 32.14% | 189 | 2.88% | 43 | 0.65% | 5 | 0.08% | 2,108 | 32.11% | 6,565 |
| Florence | 511 | 79.10% | 113 | 17.49% | 17 | 2.63% | 3 | 0.46% | 2 | 0.31% | 398 | 61.61% | 646 |
| Fond du Lac | 6,104 | 52.71% | 5,252 | 45.35% | 206 | 1.78% | 16 | 0.14% | 2 | 0.02% | 852 | 7.36% | 11,580 |
| Forest | 385 | 79.06% | 85 | 17.45% | 16 | 3.29% | 1 | 0.21% | 0 | 0.00% | 300 | 61.60% | 487 |
| Grant | 5,683 | 61.96% | 3,192 | 34.80% | 272 | 2.97% | 22 | 0.24% | 3 | 0.03% | 2,491 | 27.16% | 9,172 |
| Green | 3,038 | 61.14% | 1,748 | 35.18% | 146 | 2.94% | 37 | 0.74% | 0 | 0.00% | 1,290 | 25.96% | 4,969 |
| Green Lake | 2,070 | 55.99% | 1,540 | 41.66% | 83 | 2.25% | 4 | 0.11% | 0 | 0.00% | 530 | 14.34% | 3,697 |
| Iowa | 3,355 | 64.08% | 1,690 | 32.28% | 180 | 3.44% | 11 | 0.21% | 0 | 0.00% | 1,665 | 31.80% | 5,236 |
| Iron | 1,322 | 76.82% | 357 | 20.74% | 39 | 2.27% | 2 | 0.12% | 1 | 0.06% | 965 | 56.07% | 1,721 |
| Jackson | 2,651 | 78.09% | 641 | 18.88% | 101 | 2.97% | 2 | 0.06% | 0 | 0.00% | 2,010 | 59.20% | 3,395 |
| Jefferson | 3,733 | 46.25% | 4,160 | 51.54% | 170 | 2.11% | 7 | 0.09% | 1 | 0.01% | -427 | -5.29% | 8,071 |
| Juneau | 2,932 | 63.70% | 1,571 | 34.13% | 98 | 2.13% | 2 | 0.04% | 0 | 0.00% | 1,361 | 29.57% | 4,603 |
| Kenosha | 2,946 | 56.24% | 2,213 | 42.25% | 60 | 1.15% | 16 | 0.31% | 3 | 0.06% | 733 | 13.99% | 5,238 |
| Kewaunee | 1,727 | 49.31% | 1,738 | 49.63% | 34 | 0.97% | 3 | 0.09% | 0 | 0.00% | -11 | -0.31% | 3,502 |
| La Crosse | 5,345 | 58.45% | 3,599 | 39.35% | 192 | 2.10% | 8 | 0.09% | 1 | 0.01% | 1,746 | 19.09% | 9,145 |
| Lafayette | 2,903 | 56.79% | 2,066 | 40.41% | 141 | 2.76% | 1 | 0.02% | 1 | 0.02% | 837 | 16.37% | 5,112 |
| Langlade | 1,546 | 56.42% | 1,140 | 41.61% | 44 | 1.61% | 5 | 0.18% | 5 | 0.18% | 406 | 14.82% | 2,740 |
| Lincoln | 2,053 | 54.43% | 1,629 | 43.19% | 75 | 1.99% | 13 | 0.34% | 2 | 0.05% | 424 | 11.24% | 3,772 |
| Manitowoc | 4,279 | 48.95% | 4,230 | 48.39% | 66 | 0.76% | 162 | 1.85% | 4 | 0.05% | 49 | 0.56% | 8,741 |
| Marathon | 4,480 | 51.60% | 4,018 | 46.27% | 130 | 1.50% | 22 | 0.25% | 33 | 0.38% | 462 | 5.32% | 8,683 |
| Marinette | 4,208 | 70.52% | 1,570 | 26.31% | 175 | 2.93% | 10 | 0.17% | 4 | 0.07% | 2,638 | 44.21% | 5,967 |
| Marquette | 1,563 | 63.10% | 867 | 35.00% | 47 | 1.90% | 0 | 0.00% | 0 | 0.00% | 696 | 28.10% | 2,477 |
| Milwaukee | 34,598 | 52.30% | 25,901 | 39.16% | 729 | 1.10% | 4,673 | 7.06% | 247 | 0.37% | 8,697 | 13.15% | 66,148 |
| Monroe | 3,727 | 60.49% | 2,248 | 36.49% | 186 | 3.02% | 0 | 0.00% | 0 | 0.00% | 1,479 | 24.01% | 6,161 |
| Oconto | 2,694 | 68.22% | 1,179 | 29.86% | 72 | 1.82% | 2 | 0.05% | 2 | 0.05% | 1,515 | 38.36% | 3,949 |
| Oneida | 1,802 | 70.20% | 719 | 28.01% | 34 | 1.32% | 10 | 0.39% | 2 | 0.08% | 1,083 | 42.19% | 2,567 |
| Outagamie | 5,116 | 53.68% | 4,158 | 43.63% | 224 | 2.35% | 30 | 0.31% | 3 | 0.03% | 958 | 10.05% | 9,531 |
| Ozaukee | 1,275 | 38.46% | 1,990 | 60.03% | 35 | 1.06% | 14 | 0.42% | 1 | 0.03% | -715 | -21.57% | 3,315 |
| Pepin | 1,077 | 67.14% | 493 | 30.74% | 34 | 2.12% | 0 | 0.00% | 0 | 0.00% | 584 | 36.41% | 1,604 |
| Pierce | 3,439 | 73.01% | 1,034 | 21.95% | 232 | 4.93% | 4 | 0.08% | 1 | 0.02% | 2,405 | 51.06% | 4,710 |
| Polk | 2,780 | 78.66% | 659 | 18.65% | 71 | 2.01% | 13 | 0.37% | 10 | 0.28% | 2,121 | 60.02% | 3,534 (Note: Includes 1 Scattering vote) |
| Portage | 3,271 | 54.44% | 2,645 | 44.02% | 85 | 1.41% | 6 | 0.10% | 2 | 0.03% | 626 | 10.42% | 6,009 |
| Price | 1,733 | 74.38% | 533 | 22.88% | 49 | 2.10% | 13 | 0.56% | 2 | 0.09% | 1,200 | 51.50% | 2,330 |
| Racine | 5,748 | 56.73% | 4,019 | 39.66% | 234 | 2.31% | 125 | 1.23% | 7 | 0.07% | 1,729 | 17.06% | 10,133 |
| Richland | 2,574 | 59.56% | 1,505 | 34.82% | 233 | 5.39% | 10 | 0.23% | 0 | 0.00% | 1,069 | 24.73% | 4,322 |
| Rock | 8,253 | 70.26% | 3,073 | 26.16% | 389 | 3.31% | 25 | 0.21% | 6 | 0.05% | 5,180 | 44.10% | 11,746 |
| Sauk | 4,357 | 61.22% | 2,478 | 34.82% | 269 | 3.78% | 9 | 0.13% | 4 | 0.06% | 1,879 | 26.40% | 7,117 |
| Sawyer | 695 | 68.47% | 296 | 29.16% | 22 | 2.17% | 2 | 0.20% | 0 | 0.00% | 399 | 39.31% | 1,015 |
| Shawano | 3,224 | 66.94% | 1,518 | 31.52% | 69 | 1.43% | 3 | 0.06% | 2 | 0.04% | 1,706 | 35.42% | 4,816 |
| Sheboygan | 5,868 | 53.24% | 4,146 | 37.62% | 117 | 1.06% | 843 | 7.65% | 47 | 0.43% | 1,722 | 15.62% | 11,021 |
| St. Croix | 3,380 | 59.26% | 2,080 | 36.47% | 194 | 3.40% | 38 | 0.67% | 12 | 0.21% | 1,300 | 22.79% | 5,704 |
| Taylor | 1,372 | 55.43% | 1,066 | 43.07% | 23 | 0.93% | 13 | 0.53% | 1 | 0.04% | 306 | 12.36% | 2,475 |
| Trempealeau | 3,369 | 71.47% | 1,181 | 25.05% | 162 | 3.44% | 1 | 0.02% | 1 | 0.02% | 2,188 | 46.41% | 4,714 |
| Vernon | 4,514 | 76.81% | 1,203 | 20.47% | 143 | 2.43% | 15 | 0.26% | 2 | 0.03% | 3,311 | 56.34% | 5,877 |
| Vilas | 1,194 | 68.46% | 502 | 28.78% | 36 | 2.06% | 11 | 0.63% | 1 | 0.06% | 692 | 39.68% | 1,744 |
| Walworth | 5,074 | 71.12% | 1,755 | 24.60% | 299 | 4.19% | 6 | 0.08% | 0 | 0.00% | 3,319 | 46.52% | 7,134 |
| Washburn | 814 | 74.61% | 247 | 22.64% | 27 | 2.47% | 1 | 0.09% | 2 | 0.18% | 567 | 51.97% | 1,091 |
| Washington | 2,599 | 50.22% | 2,524 | 48.77% | 45 | 0.87% | 6 | 0.12% | 1 | 0.02% | 75 | 1.45% | 5,175 |
| Waukesha | 5,130 | 61.07% | 3,017 | 35.92% | 235 | 2.80% | 15 | 0.18% | 3 | 0.04% | 2,113 | 25.15% | 8,400 |
| Waupaca | 5,269 | 76.13% | 1,394 | 20.14% | 253 | 3.66% | 2 | 0.03% | 3 | 0.04% | 3,875 | 55.99% | 6,921 |
| Waushara | 2,957 | 81.21% | 557 | 15.30% | 124 | 3.41% | 3 | 0.08% | 0 | 0.00% | 2,400 | 65.92% | 3,641 |
| Winnebago | 7,266 | 54.23% | 5,788 | 43.20% | 311 | 2.32% | 25 | 0.19% | 8 | 0.06% | 1,478 | 11.03% | 13,398 |
| Wood | 3,126 | 60.96% | 1,895 | 36.95% | 71 | 1.38% | 31 | 0.60% | 5 | 0.10% | 1,231 | 24.01% | 5,128 |
| Total | 264,419 | 59.84% | 160,674 | 36.36% | 9,707 | 2.20% | 6,590 | 1.49% | 509 | 0.12% | 103,745 | 23.48% | 441,900 |

==== Counties that flipped from Democratic to Republican ====
- Dane
- Langlade
- Lincoln
- Manitowoc
- Taylor
- Washington
- Wood

== Bibliography ==
- Glashan, Roy R. (1979). American Governors and Gubernatorial Elections, 1775-1978. Meckler Books. ISBN 0-930466-17-9.
- Gubernatorial Elections, 1787-1997. Washington, D.C.: Congressional Quarterly Inc. 1998. ISBN 1-56802-396-0.
- Froehlich, Wm. H., ed. (1901). The Blue Book of the State of Wisconsin. Milwaukee: Northwestern Litho. Co.
