= John H. Carr =

American politician (born 1849)

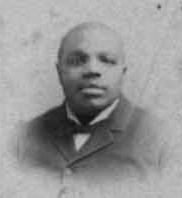
John H. Carr – Arkansas House of Representatives

John H. Carr (November 14, 1849 – ?) was a farmer and member of the Arkansas Legislature in 1891. He represented Phillips County, Arkansas. He served in the Arkansas House of Representatives in 1891.

== Personal life ==
Carr was born and raised in Helena, Arkansas. He was a sergeant in the state militia. He was a Baptist and a member of a Masonic lodge.

== Career ==
A Republican, he served as a state representative in 1889, 1890, and 1891. He represented Phillips County. He voted against a poll tax.

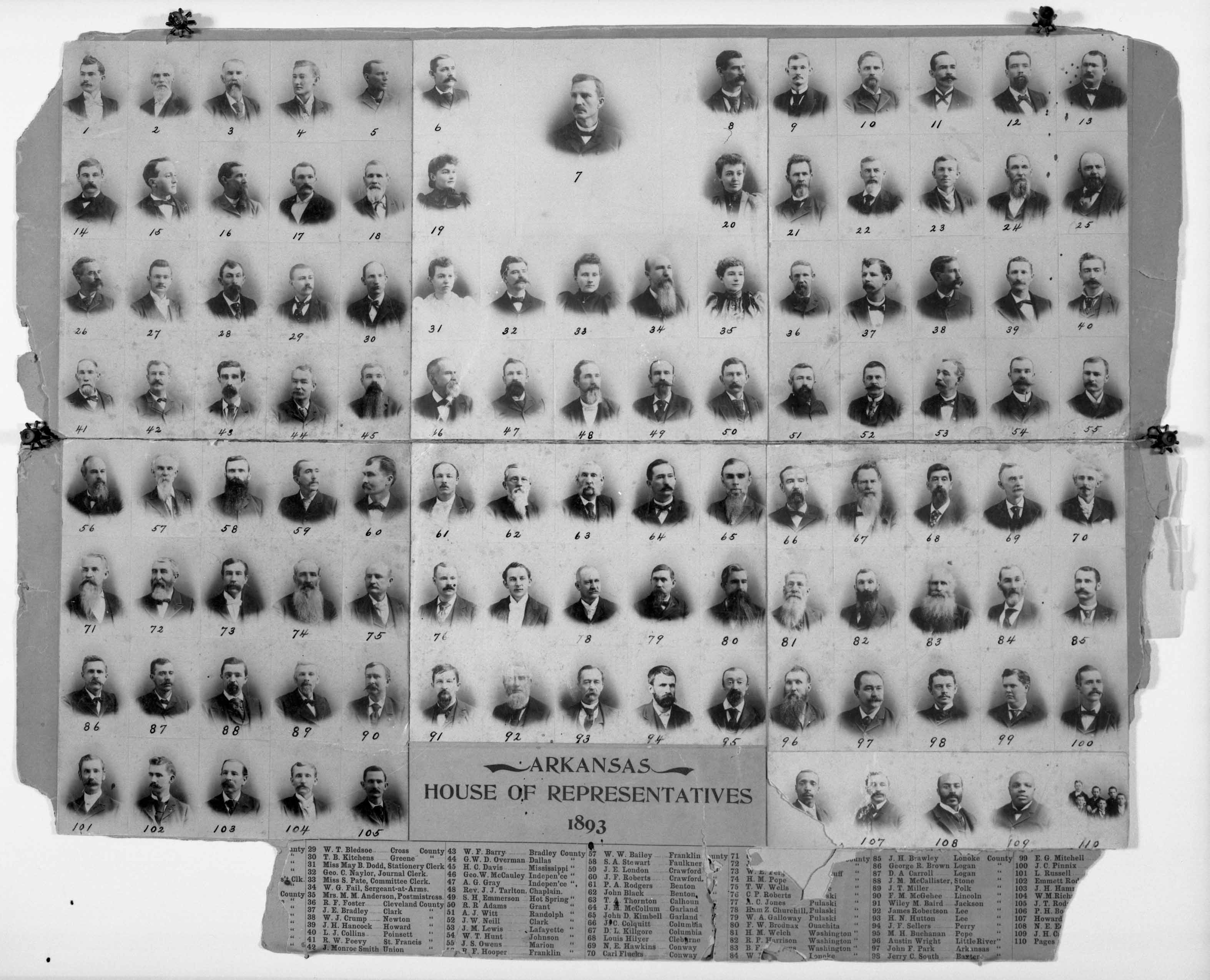
Members of the 1893 Arkansas House of Representatives (numbers 106 to 109 are the African Americans)

He was included in a photo montage and series of profiles of African American state legislators serving in Arkansas in 1891 published in The Freeman newspaper in Indianapolis. He and other members of the 1893 Arkansas House of Representatives were photographed.

== See also ==
- African American officeholders from the end of the Civil War until before 1900
