= List of elections in 1895 =

The following elections occurred in the year 1895.

- 1895 Liberian general election
- 1895 Peruvian presidential election
- 1895 Philippine municipal elections
- 1895 Salvadoran presidential election

== North America ==
=== Canada ===
- 1895 Edmonton municipal election
- 1895 New Brunswick general election

=== United States ===
==== United States gubernatorial ====
- 1895 Iowa gubernatorial election
- 1895 Kentucky gubernatorial election
- 1895 Maryland gubernatorial election
- 1895 Massachusetts gubernatorial election
- 1895 Mississippi gubernatorial election
- 1895 New Jersey gubernatorial election
- 1895 Ohio gubernatorial election
- 1895 Rhode Island gubernatorial election
- 1895 United States gubernatorial elections
- 1895 Utah gubernatorial election

==== United States House of Representatives ====
- 1895 United States House of Representatives elections
- 1895 United States House of Representatives election in Utah

==== United States Senate ====
- 1895 United States Senate elections
- United States Senate special election in California, 1895
- United States Senate election in Massachusetts, 1895

==== United States mayoral elections ====
- 1895 Boston mayoral election
- 1895 Chicago mayoral election
- 1895 Philadelphia mayoral election
- 1895 San Diego mayoral election

==== Other ====
- 1895 Iowa Senate election
- 1895 New York state election

== Asia ==
- 1895 Philippine municipal elections

== Europe ==
- 1895 Dalmatian parliamentary election
- 1895 Danish Folketing election
- 1895 Faroese general election
- 1895 Greek parliamentary election
- 1895 Italian general election
- 1895 Portuguese legislative election
- 1895 Serbian parliamentary election

=== United Kingdom ===
- 1895 United Kingdom general election
  - 1895 United Kingdom general election in Ireland
  - 1895 United Kingdom general election in Scotland

== Oceania ==
=== New Zealand ===
- 1895 City of Auckland by-election

== See also ==
- Category:1895 elections
