= Jeff Davis (Arkansas politician) =

American politician (1862–1913)

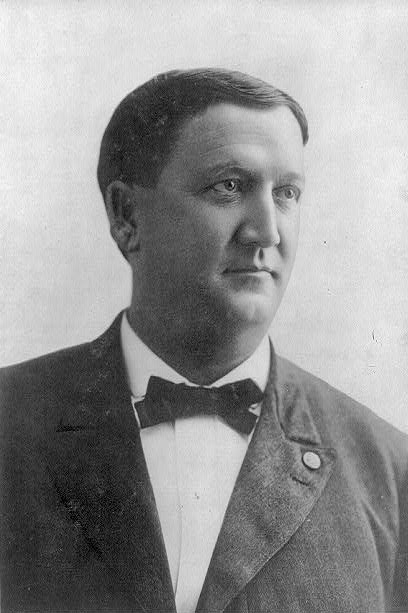

United States Senator from Arkansas
- In office March 4, 1907 – January 3, 1913
- Preceded by: James H. Berry
- Succeeded by: John N. Heiskell

20th Governor of Arkansas
- In office January 8, 1901 – January 8, 1907
- Preceded by: Daniel W. Jones
- Succeeded by: John Sebastian Little

21st Arkansas Attorney General
- In office 1899–1901
- Governor: Daniel W. Jones
- Preceded by: E. B. Kinsworthy
- Succeeded by: George W. Murphy

Personal details
- Born: Jefferson Davis; May 6, 1862 Rocky Comfort, Arkansas, C.S.
- Died: January 3, 1913 (aged 50) Little Rock, Arkansas, U.S.
- Resting place: Mount Holly Cemetery, Little Rock, Arkansas, U.S. 34°44′15.3″N 92°16′42.5″W
- Party: Democratic
- Spouse(s): Ina MacKenzie (1882–1910); Leila Carter (1911–1913)
- Education: University of Arkansas; Vanderbilt University; Cumberland University (J.D.)
- Profession: Lawyer

Jeff Davis (born Jefferson Davis; May 6, 1862 – January 3, 1913) was an American Democratic politician who served as the 20th governor of Arkansas from 1901 to 1907 and in the U.S. Senate from 1907 to 1913. He took office as one of Arkansas's first New South governors and proved to be one of the state's most polarizing figures. Davis used his silver tongue and aptitude for demagoguery to exploit existing feelings of agrarian frustration among poor white farmers and thus built a large populist appeal. However, since Davis often blamed city-dwellers, blacks, and Yankees for problems on the farm, the state was quickly and ardently split into "pro-Davis" and "anti-Davis" factions.

Davis began his political career as Arkansas Attorney General, where he immediately began making political waves. His office challenged the legality of the Kimball State House Act and made an extremely-controversial extraterritorial interpretation of the Rector Antitrust Act. His fight to prevent trusts from doing business in Arkansas and the extreme lengths that he went to enforce his opinion would be a common theme throughout his political career. He gained credibility among the poor white farmers, who would become his base.

Davis's three two-year terms as governor "produced more politics than government," but he gained construction of a new state house and reformed the penal system. An almost-constant series of scandals and outrageous behavior characterized his time in office, which followed him when he won election to the Senate in 1906. Davis is often classified with such populist politicians as Benjamin Tillman, Robert Love Taylor, Thomas E. Watson, James K. Vardaman, Coleman Livingston Blease, and then Huey Long, controversial figures who were Southern demagogues, populists, and political bosses.

== Early life ==
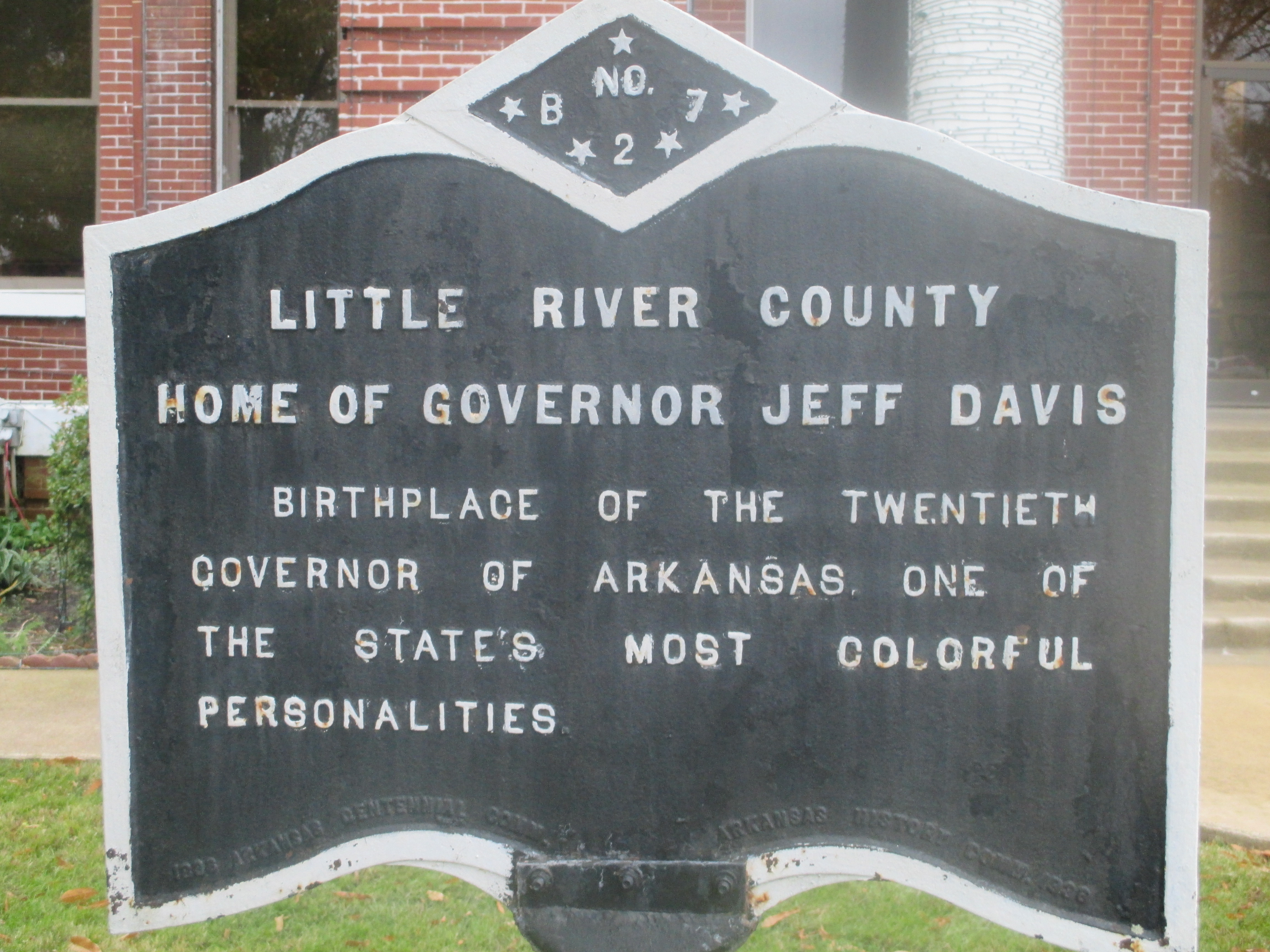
Historical marker of the birthplace of Governor Jeff Davis

Davis was born near Rocky Comfort in Little River County in southwestern Arkansas. His parents were Lewis W. Davis, a Baptist preacher originally from Kentucky, and his wife Elizabeth Phillips, originally from Tuscaloosa, Alabama. Lewis Davis did not join the Confederate army until drafted in 1864. He named his only son after Jefferson Davis, then-President of the Confederate States of America. His military service was largely performed as a chaplain's commission, but he quit the ministry following the war and became a lawyer.

=== American Civil War and Reconstruction ===
No Civil War battles were fought within Sevier County's bounds, but there were many opportunities for the war to make an impression on the young Jeff Davis. After the Union captured Little Rock in 1863, the state capitol was moved to Washington. Union General Nathaniel Banks later led the Red River Campaign through the county, an unsuccessful attempt to capture Shreveport, Louisiana via southwest Arkansas. Beginning in 1865, Laynesport, not far from the Davis property, was fortified as a Confederate garrison. Perhaps equally indelible was the romanticism of "The Lost Cause" myth in the years following the war; as a majority of southwestern Arkansas residents remained staunch Confederate supporters.

Following the war, Lewis Davis was elected to serve as county and probate judge of Sevier County, and later Little River County following its creation by the state legislature in 1867. The following year, Congressional or Radical Reconstruction swept Davis and most other Democrats from office by temporarily banning former Confederates from office and passing amendments to enfranchise freedmen. Confederate supporters did not accept this political overhaul, turning to vigilante groups such as the Ku Klux Klan and Knights of the White Camelia to intimidate blacks and Republicans. The rough and tumble nature of Little River County was especially conductive for gangs, outlaws and violence.

Eventually the situation devolved to such lawlessness that governor Powell Clayton declared martial law in Little River and nine other counties to restore order. Desperado Cullen Baker initially assembled a posse to oppose Clayton's militia, but after several skirmishes, the militia gained control of the county. Local history tells of rape, torture, murder and pillaging of blacks and white Republican sympathizers by the militia in the ensuing months. The martial law months were later described by Jeff Davis as the "most bitter episode of his youth". In 1869 the Davis family moved to Dover, Arkansas in the Arkansas River Valley.

=== Move to Pope County ===
Following a move to Pope County, Lewis Davis found that his previous service as judge quickly elevated him within a very small legal community. However, the Davis family had moved into a post-war situation that was similarly violent to that of Little River County and rooted deep in Pope County's past. With the population divided sharply into city-country and Union-Rebel factions, both sides held grudges long after the war was over. The Republican domination of local government resulted in resentment by the ex-Confederate Democrats, and the situation exploded in 1872. In what was later known as the Pope County Militia War, the county experienced a period of political and civil troubles while an unofficial militia headed by four radical Republican aligned county officials ran roughshod over the county. By its end, three of the four had been killed. Pope County Democrats became heroes across the state for openly providing armed resistance to Powell Clayton's state militia. Such Reconstruction violence continued to have a strong effect on ten-year-old Jeff Davis.

== Education and early career ==
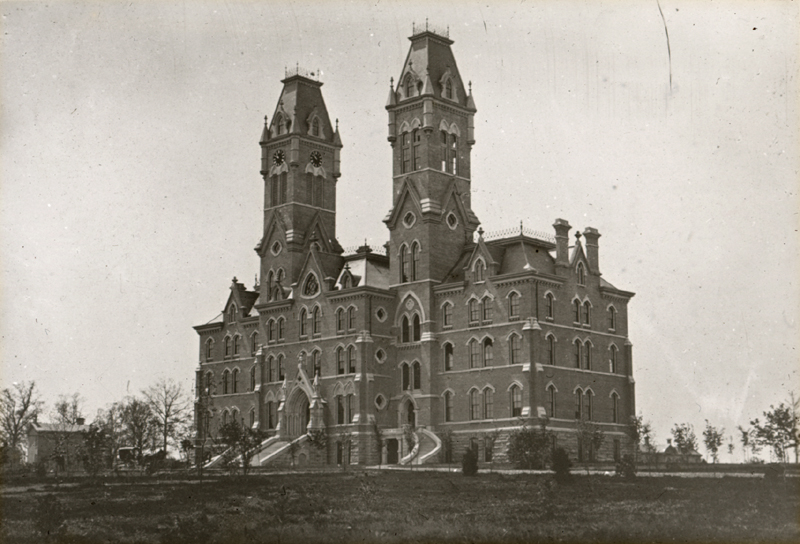
Main Building as it would've appeared when Davis attended Vanderbilt Law School in 1880

Davis attended public schools in Russellville, Arkansas. After being rejected by West Point in 1878, Davis enrolled at the University of Arkansas in Fayetteville, where he studied until 1880. He transferred to Vanderbilt University in Nashville, Tennessee. Although he completed the two-year law curriculum in one year, the Vanderbilt University Law School withheld his diploma for failure to satisfy their residency requirement.

With the help of his father's influence, Davis returned to Russellville in the summer of 1881 and was accepted to the Arkansas Bar Association despite being underaged. In the fall of 1881, Davis enrolled at Cumberland University's law school, which granted his law degree in May 1882.

Now twenty years old, Davis joined his father's law firm, L.W. Davis and Son, Attorneys, in Russellville as a junior law partner. Focusing on homestead cases, the law practice had become rather successful. The elder Davis, buoyed by a growing law practice while also working as a newspaper editor, real estate broker, and local booster, had become one of the county's most successful citizens. The elder Davis won election to the Arkansas General Assembly in 1877. Jeff Davis became deeply involved in political campaigns as early as 1884.

After supporting Grover Cleveland in the 1888 presidential election, Davis decided to run for district prosecuting attorney in the Fifth Judicial District the following cycle.

== Politics ==
At the time, the South was ruled by an unofficial one-party system, with Democratic hegemony, white supremacy, and black disfranchisement remaining intertwined after Reconstruction and well into the 20th century. Prominent landowning white men of the former planter class were returned to power by Democratic supporters and known as Redeemers in the waning years of Reconstruction. After 1877, they largely ruled statewide and national positions as well as an increasing number of local positions once the state passed disenfranchisement of blacks. They sought to reverse Republican gains made during Reconstruction and to return to white supremacy of the Antebellum South by disenfranchising most blacks and imposing Jim Crow laws. An insurgent paramilitary component, including groups such as the Ku Klux Klan, also rose to prominence during the period. Together with common whites, they committed countless lynchings and other acts of violence against Republicans, blacks, and other groups.

=== Style and contemporaries ===
Davis is often classified with politicians such as Benjamin Tillman, Robert Love Taylor, Thomas E. Watson, James K. Vardaman, Coleman Livingston Blease, and later Huey Long, controversial figures who were Southern demagogues, populists, and political bosses. Davis was one of many Southern demagogue politicians who rose to power on a populist message of agrarian frustration with big business and elites. His coarse language, insults, and theatrics were all crafted to enhance his "common man" credentials. Davis made a career of skewering the business interests, newspapers, and urban dwellers to appeal to the poor rural citizens, the majority of the population. He portrayed himself as “just another poor country boy” against the moneyed interests that held back the common man. Davis often used words such as "rednecks" or "hillbillies" but as terms of endearment rather than pejorative, a technique that Huey Long would learn from Davis and later use successfully in Louisiana.

Like many of his contemporaries, Davis used a rhetoric that was strongly racist and segregationist. Although Davis did not succeed in implementing many of his racist promises on the stump, he supported disfranchisement of blacks, segregation of school taxes, and white supremacy. He attacked 1904 gubernatorial opponent Carroll D. Wood for appointing a black man as a jury commissioner and promised that "no man could be appointed to office under my administration unless he was a white man, a Democrat, and a Jeff Davis man."

It was said that many of his supporters incorrectly believed Davis to be related to Confederate President Jefferson Davis, which the politician did nothing to discourage and may have covertly encouraged.

=== Early career ===
Davis served as prosecuting attorney of the Fifth Judicial District of Arkansas from 1892 to 1896.

==== Attorney General ====
Davis was elected as Arkansas Attorney General in 1898 and served a single term. He focused on one of the primary issues of the Progressive Era: the creation of antitrust law to regulate trusts, meaning large companies or combinations abusing market power or tending toward monopoly. Despite passage of the Sherman Antitrust Act of 1890 at the federal level, the law was sufficiently broad to have little immediate impact, and was largely made ineffective by the United States Supreme Court case United States v. E. C. Knight Co., leaving state legislatures to address trusts. A new antitrust bill passed by the 32nd Arkansas General Assembly, focused on perceived price fixing of fire insurance rates in the cities of Arkansas, especially Hot Springs, raised the issue's prominence in Arkansas politics by uniting city dwellers alongside rural Arkansans in anger against the trusts.

==== Governor ====
Elected in 1900, Davis served as Governor of Arkansas from 1901 to 1907. While serving in this position, various laws aimed at helping working people were introduced.

In 1905, when US President Theodore Roosevelt visited Arkansas, Davis greeted him with a speech that defended lynching as a means of social control. Roosevelt responded with a calmer speech that defended the rule of law.

=== US Senate ===
Davis was elected to the US Senate by the state legislature, as was customary at the time, serving one term from March 4, 1907 until his death. He was chairman of the Committee on the Mississippi and its Tributaries.

== Death ==
Davis served in the Senate until his death in 1913. He is buried at historic Mount Holly Cemetery, in Little Rock, Arkansas.

== See also ==
- List of governors of Arkansas
- List of members of the United States Congress who died in office (1900–1949)

== Notes ==
Party political offices
Preceded by Daniel W. Jones	Democratic nominee for Governor of Arkansas; 1900, 1902, 1904	Succeeded by John Sebastian Little
Political offices
Preceded by E. B. Kinsworthy	Arkansas Attorney General; 1898–1901	Succeeded by George W. Murphy
Political offices
Preceded by Daniel Webster Jones	Governor of Arkansas; 1901–1907	Succeeded by John Sebastian Little
U.S. Senate
Preceded by James Henderson Berry	U.S. Senator (Class 2) from Arkansas; 1907–1913	Succeeded by John Netherland Heiskell
