= James P. Clarke =

American politician (1854–1916)

James Paul Clarke
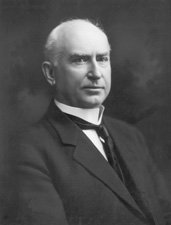

President pro tempore of the United States Senate
- In office March 13, 1913 – October 1, 1916
- Preceded by: Jacob H. Gallinger
- Succeeded by: Willard Saulsbury Jr.

United States Senator from Arkansas
- In office March 4, 1903 – October 1, 1916
- Preceded by: James K. Jones
- Succeeded by: William F. Kirby

18th Governor of Arkansas
- In office January 18, 1895 – January 18, 1897
- Preceded by: William Meade Fishback
- Succeeded by: Daniel Webster Jones

Attorney General of Arkansas
- In office 1893–1895
- Governor: William M. Fishback
- Preceded by: William E. Atkinson
- Succeeded by: E. B. Kinsworthy

Member of the Arkansas Senate from the 14th district
- In office January 10, 1889 – January 9, 1893
- Preceded by: George B. Peters
- Succeeded by: Henry N. Word

Member of the Arkansas House of Representatives from the Phillips County district
- In office January 10, 1887 – January 10, 1889 Serving with R. B. Macon, J. N. Donohoo

Personal details
- Born: August 18, 1854 Yazoo City, Mississippi, U.S.
- Died: October 1, 1916 (aged 62) Little Rock, Arkansas, U.S.
- Resting place: Oakland Cemetery
- Party: Democratic
- Spouse: Sallie (née Moore) Wooten (m. 1883)
- Children: James P. Clarke, Jr. Julia Clarke; Marion Clarke
- Relatives: Clarke Tucker (great-great-grandson)
- Education: University of Virginia
- Profession: Lawyer

James Paul Clarke (August 18, 1854 – October 1, 1916) was an American lawyer and politician from the Arkansas Delta during the Progressive Era. He served in public office over a period of almost 30 years, rising from the Arkansas General Assembly to Attorney General of Arkansas and later 18th governor of Arkansas, ending his career in the United States Senate. In a period of Democratic Party hegemony known as the "Solid South", Clarke blended positions of the budding Populist movement, such as free silver and railroad regulation, with nationalism and his gifted skills as an orator to popularity and electoral success.

== Early life ==
Clarke was born in Yazoo City, Mississippi, in the Mississippi Delta. His father Walter, an architect, died when Clarke was seven years old, and he was raised by his mother, Ellen (née White), daughter of a prominent planter class family. Clarke attended public schools as well as Tutwilder's Academy in Greenbrier, Alabama. After briefly editing a newspaper in Yazoo City, Clarke graduated with a law degree at the University of Virginia Law School in 1878. Clarke was admitted to the bar in 1879, and settled briefly in the small Arkansas River Valley town of Ozark, Arkansas prior to moving to Helena, Arkansas in the Arkansas Delta.

Clarke married Sallie (née Moore) Wooten of Moon Lake, Mississippi on November 10, 1883. Wooten had a son from previous marriage, Alonzo Stuart "Lonnie" Wooten; the couple had two daughters and a son.

== Career ==
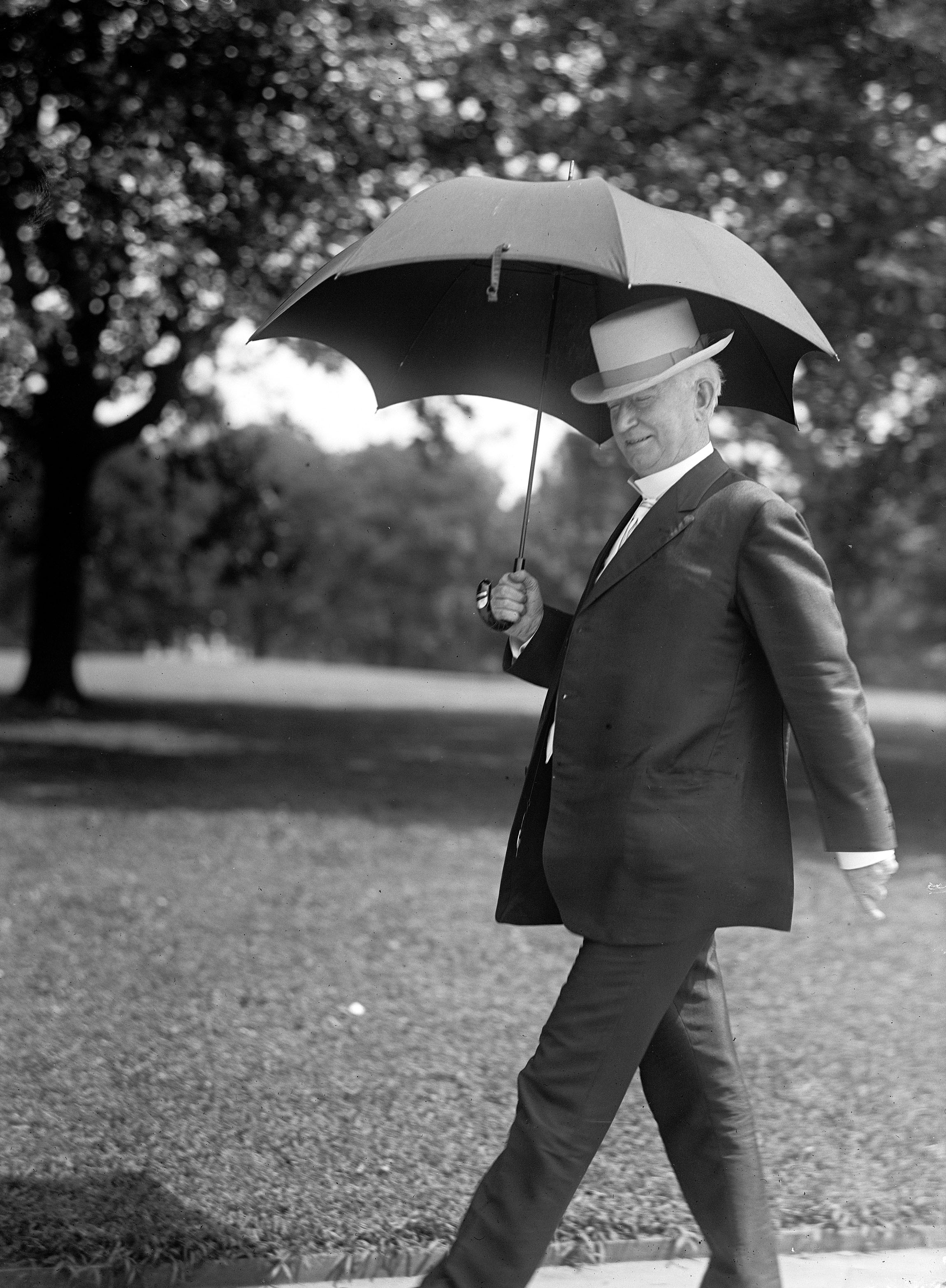
James Paul Clarke

=== Arkansas General Assembly ===
Eight years into his legal career, Clarke won election to the Arkansas House of Representatives to represent Phillips County in 1886. He was seated alongside R. B. Macon and J. N. Donohoo in the 26th Arkansas General Assembly on January 10, 1887. Following a single term in the Arkansas House, Clarke won election to the Arkansas Senate. Clarke represented the 14th District, which covered Phillips and Lee counties beginning with the 27th Arkansas General Assembly. In 1891, he was elected President of the Arkansas Senate for the 28th Arkansas General Assembly.

=== Statewide ===
He served as Attorney General of Arkansas and served from 1892 to 1894.

He served as Governor of Arkansas from 1895 to 1897. Clarke was devoted to upholding American nationalism as the keystone of the Democratic Party. 'The people of the South,' he said in his closing speech of the election, 'looked to the Democratic party to preserve the white standards of civilization.' Clarke easily defeated his opponents."

His term was largely unsuccessful and his legislation to end prizefighting and establish four-year terms for state officers failed. After leaving office in 1897, he moved his permanent residence to Little Rock, Arkansas and practiced law.

== U.S. Senate ==
Clarke was elected to the United States Senate in 1903 and served until his death in 1916. He served as President pro tempore of the United States Senate during the Sixty-third and Sixty-fourth Congresses.

== Death and legacy ==
Clarke died in Little Rock, Arkansas. He is buried at Oakland Cemetery in Little Rock. Despite an ineffective tenure as governor, Clarke and his successor, Daniel Jones, marked a departure in the conservative Democratic Party of Arkansas toward a more populist party. They dealt with the electoral threat of a nascent Populist party by incorporating some reforms into the Democratic platform, in conflict with the positions of national Democrats. Clarke is remembered for a silver tongue, short temper, and willingness to fight.

Clarke's statue was one of two statues that were presented by the State of Arkansas to the National Statuary Hall Collection at the United States Capitol. In 2019 the decision was made to replace his statue, and that of Uriah Milton Rose, with statues of Johnny Cash and Daisy Lee Gatson Bates. In the case of Clarke, the reason given is "his racist beliefs". Clarke's great-great-grandson, State Senator Clarke Tucker, in a 2018 column strongly supported replacing Clarke's statue: "I strongly hope one of the new statues will be Daisy Bates or a member of the Little Rock Nine."

== See also ==
- List of members of the United States Congress who died in office (1900–1949)

Party political offices
Preceded by William Meade Fishback	Democratic nominee for Governor of Arkansas; 1894	Succeeded by Daniel Webster Jones
First	Democratic nominee for U.S. Senator from Arkansas (Class 3); 1914	Succeeded by William F. Kirby
Political offices
Preceded by William Meade Fishback	Governor of Arkansas; 1895–1897	Succeeded by Daniel Webster Jones
U.S. Senate
Preceded by James K. Jones	United States Senator (Class 3) from Arkansas; 1903–1916	Succeeded by William F. Kirby
Preceded by Rotating pro tems	President pro tempore of the United States Senate; March 13, 1913 – October 1, 1916	Succeeded by Willard Saulsbury Jr.
