= A. W. Files =

Arkansas politician (1829–1913)

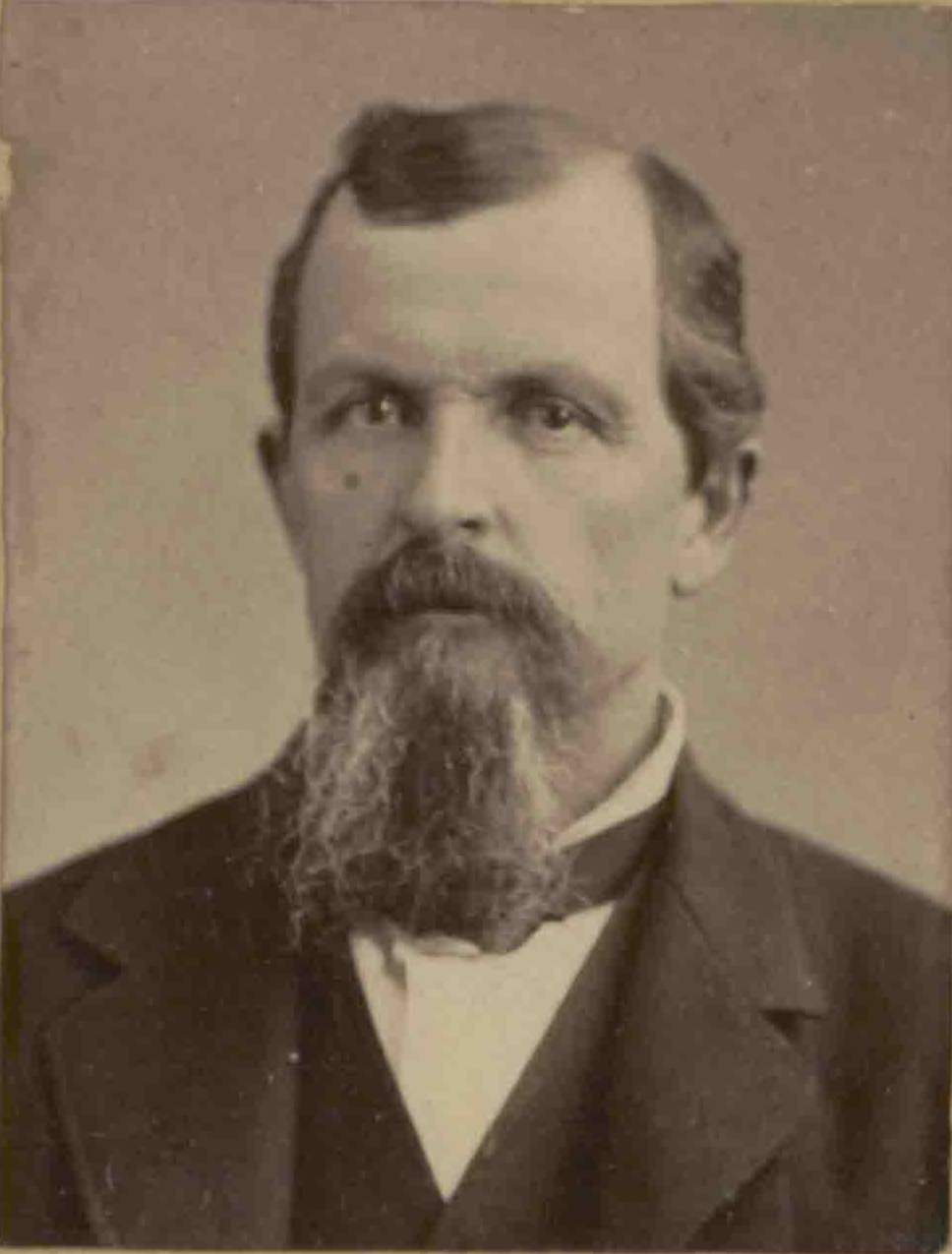

11th Arkansas State Auditor
- In office 1883–1887
- Governor: James H. Berry; Simon Pollard Hughes Jr.
- Preceded by: John Crawford
- Succeeded by: William Read Miller

Personal details
- Born: Abner W. Files; November 26, 1829
- Died: March 24, 1913 (aged 83)
- Party: Progressive
- Other political affiliations: Populist; Democratic
- Children: 5
- Profession: Politician, newspaper editor

Military service
- Allegiance: Confederate States of America
- Branch/service: Confederate States Army

Abner W. Files (November 26, 1829 – March 24, 1913), also known as A. W. Files, was a newspaper editor and state auditor in Arkansas. He edited the Ashley County Times. He also ran for governor as a Populist before returning to the Democratic Party. He served in the Confederate Army.

He was born in Tuscaloosa, Alabama. He served as State Auditor of Arkansas for four years from 1883 to 1887 as a Democrat. He was succeeded in office by former State Auditor and former Governor of Arkansas William Read Miller.

He lived in Little Rock. He was a private secretary for Governor James P. Eagle. He became a Populist, and served as its party chairman in Arkansas, and then joined the Bull Moose Party. He married and had four daughters and a son.

He died at home.
