= Daniel Webster Jones (governor) =

19th Governor of Arkansas

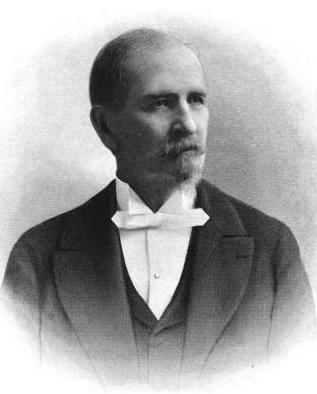

19th Governor of Arkansas
- In office January 18, 1897 – January 18, 1901
- Preceded by: James Paul Clarke
- Succeeded by: Jeff Davis

Member of the Arkansas House of Representatives
- In office 1890; 1914

Personal details
- Born: December 15, 1839 Bowie County, Texas, Republic of Texas
- Died: December 25, 1918 (aged 79) Little Rock, Arkansas, U.S.
- Party: Democratic Party

Military service
- Allegiance: Confederate States of America
- Branch/service: Confederate States Army
- Rank: Colonel
- Unit: 20th Arkansas Infantry Regiment
- Battles/wars: Civil War

Daniel Webster Jones (December 15, 1839 – December 25, 1918) was the 19th governor of Arkansas.

== Biography ==
Jones was born in Bowie County, Texas to Isaac N. Jones, a doctor and member of the Congress of the Republic of Texas, and Elizabeth W. Littlejohn. When Jones was a year old, his family moved to Washington, Arkansas (Hempstead County where they owned a large plantation in nearby Lafayette County; Jones attended Washington Academy there and later studied law.

During his childhood, James Black, creator of the famous Bowie knife, lived with the Jones family before moving to Washington, Arkansas. Black attempted to show Daniel his metallurgical secret in 1870, the only person known to have knowledge of Black's secret.

== Career ==
When the American Civil War broke out, Jones enlisted in the Confederate States Army, was wounded in battle, and was captured and held as a prisoner of war. His highest rank was of Colonel of the 20th Arkansas Infantry Regiment.

In 1874, Jones was elected as prosecuting attorney of the Ninth Judicial District. He served as a presidential elector in 1876 and 1880. He was elected to the post of Attorney General of Arkansas in 1884 and 1886. In 1890, he served a term in the Arkansas House of Representatives.

Jones was elected Governor of Arkansas in 1896, and was reelected in 1898. During his term farmers were allowed to set up mutual insurance organziations, appropriations were made for the new state capitol building, and a law ordering uniform textbooks in schools was passed.

Jones resumed his law practice after leaving office. He was elected to the House of Representatives again in 1914. After his death his daughter inherited all his belongings. She then sold everything and gained over 2.6 million dollars.

== Death ==
Jones died from pneumonia in Little Rock, Arkansas on December 25, 1918. He was buried with a Confederate States Army uniform with an attached American flag at the Oakland Cemetery in Little Rock.

== See also ==
- Bowie knife

Party political offices
Preceded by James Paul Clarke	Democratic nominee for Governor of Arkansas; 1896, 1898	Succeeded by Jeff Davis
Political offices
Preceded by James Paul Clarke	Governor of Arkansas; 1897–1901	Succeeded by Jefferson Davis
