= 1849 Arkansas gubernatorial special election =

- March 13, 1849
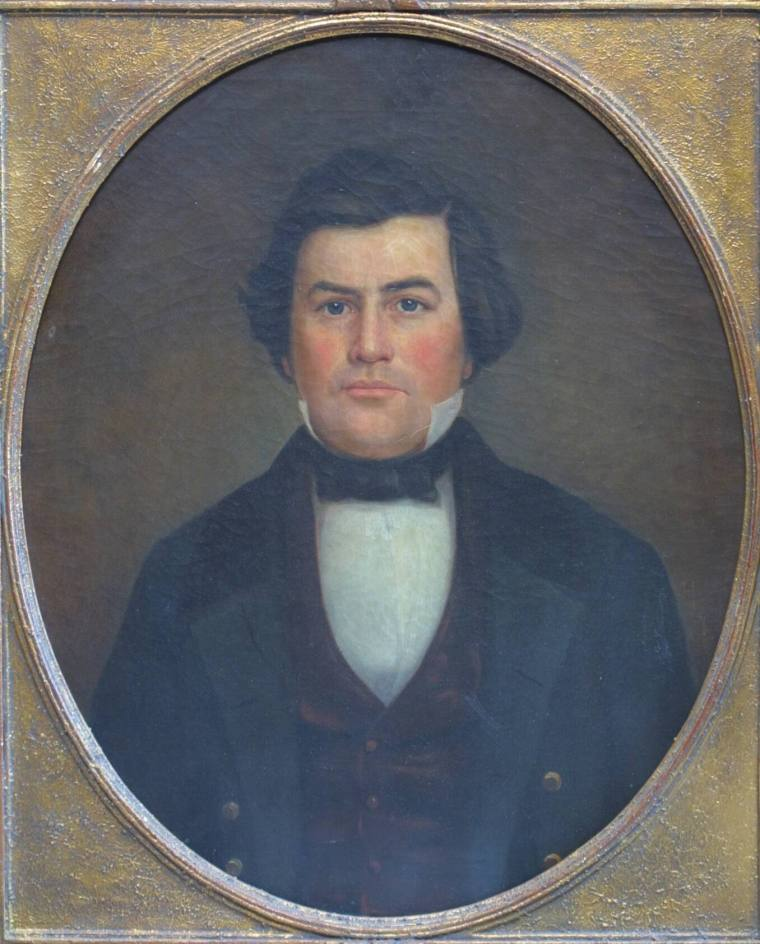

Candidate	John S. Roane	Cyrus W. Wilson
Party	Democratic	Whig
Popular vote	3,290	3,228
Percentage	50.48%	49.52%
- Roane: 50%-60% 60%-70% 70%-80% 80%-90% 90%-100% Wilson: 50%-60% 60%-70% 70%-80% 80%-90% 90%-100% Tie No data
Governor before election
Richard C. Byrd (Acting)
Democratic
Elected Governor
John S. Roane
Democratic

The 1849 Arkansas gubernatorial special election was held on March 13, 1849, to elect the governor of Arkansas for the remainder of Governor Thomas S. Drew's term, which became vacant after his resignation on January 10, 1849, due to the low salary he received as governor. The Democratic nominee and former speaker of the Arkansas House of Representatives, John S. Roane, defeated the Whig nominee, Cyrus W. Wilson, by a slim margin of 62 votes, or 0.96%.

== General election ==
On election day, March 13, 1849, Democratic nominee John S. Roane won the election by a margin of 62 votes over his opponent, Whig nominee Cyrus W. Wilson, thereby retaining Democratic control over the office of Governor. Roane was sworn in as the 4th Governor of Arkansas on April 19, 1849.

=== Results ===
1849 Arkansas gubernatorial special election
Party	Candidate	Votes	%
Democratic	John S. Roane	3,290	50.48
Whig	Cyrus W. Wilson	3,228	49.52
Total votes		6,518	100.00
Democratic hold			

==== Results by county ====
Results by county
County	John Selden Roane		Cyrus W. Wilson		Total
County	Votes	%	Votes	%	Total
Arkansas	No data (Note: Arkansas, Ashley, Greene, Izard, Mississippi, and Poinsett counties did not report results and their votes, if elections were even held, were not counted.)				
Ashley	No data				
Benton	116	72.50%	44	27.50%	160
Bradley	39	38.24%	63	61.76%	102
Carroll	100	68.03%	47	31.97%	147
Chicot	16	32.00%	34	68.00%	50
Clark	45	43.69%	58	56.31%	103
Conway	105	64.81%	57	35.19%	162
Crawford	170	47.89%	185	52.11%	355
Crittenden	4	17.39%	19	82.61%	23
Dallas	74	47.74%	81	52.26%	155
Desha	28	54.90%	23	45.10%	51
Drew	68	41.46%	96	58.54%	164
Franklin	59	56.73%	45	43.27%	104
Fulton	23	85.19%	4	14.81%	27
Greene	No data				
Hempstead	66	26.19%	186	73.81%	252
Hot Spring	26	32.50%	54	67.50%	80
Independence	207	53.35%	181	46.65%	388
Izard	No data				
Jackson	74	61.67%	46	38.33%	120
Jefferson	64	33.86%	125	66.14%	189
Johnson	82	46.86%	93	53.14%	175
Lafayette	13	30.23%	30	69.77%	43
Lawrence	141	52.81%	126	47.19%	267
Madison	130	67.71%	62	32.29%	192
Marion	18	50.00%	18	50.00%	36
Mississippi	No data				
Monroe	39	49.37%	40	50.63%	79
Montgomery	27	50.94%	26	49.06%	53
Newton	60	86.96%	9	13.04%	69
Ouachita	137	35.49%	249	64.51%	386
Perry	23	67.65%	11	32.35%	34
Phillips	56	33.14%	113	66.86%	169
Pike	61	80.26%	15	19.74%	76
Poinsett	No data				
Polk	62	74.70%	21	25.30%	83
Pope	108	42.52%	146	57.48%	254
Prairie	10	24.39%	31	75.61%	41
Pulaski	139	37.77%	229	62.23%	368
Randolph	85	91.40%	8	8.60%	93
Saline	85	57.05%	64	42.95%	149
Scott	55	67.90%	26	32.10%	81
Searcy	32	60.38%	21	39.62%	53
Sevier	2	10.00%	18	90.00%	20
St. Francis	89	70.63%	37	29.37%	126
Union	233	53.94%	199	46.06%	432
Van Buren	42	46.67%	48	53.33%	90
Washington	146	46.65%	167	53.35%	313
White	37	66.07%	19	33.93%	56
Yell	94	63.51%	54	36.49%	148
Total	3290	50.48%	3228	49.52%	6518
