= 1848 Arkansas gubernatorial election =

- August 7, 1848
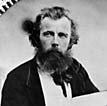

Candidate	Thomas S. Drew	Reuben T. Redman
Party	Democratic	Write-in
Popular vote	15,866	332
Percentage	94.81%	1.98%
- Drew: 70%-80% 80%-90% 90%-100% Redman: 50%-60% No data
Governor before election
Thomas S. Drew
Democratic
Elected Governor
Thomas S. Drew
Democratic

The 1848 Arkansas gubernatorial election was held on August 7, 1848, in order to elect the Governor of Arkansas. Democratic nominee and incumbent Governor Thomas S. Drew won re-election as he ran unopposed.

== General election ==
On election day, August 7, 1848, Democratic nominee Thomas S. Drew won re-election with 15,866 votes as he ran unopposed, thereby retaining Democratic control over the office of Governor. However, over five percent of the vote went to various write-in candidates, including Reuben T. Redman, who carried Crittenden County and received nearly 2% of the popular vote. Franklin, Fulton, Izard, Jackson, Lawrence, Marion and Pulaski counties did not report results. The results from Pike County were rejected. Drew resigned the next year, citing financial hardship.

=== Results ===
1848 Arkansas gubernatorial election
Party	Candidate	Votes	%
Democratic	Thomas S. Drew	15,866	94.81
Write-in	Reuben T. Redman	332	1.98
Write-in	Henry Biscoe	163	0.97
Write-in	Lorenzo Gibson	115	0.69
Write-in	Albert Pike	104	0.62
Write-in	Other candidates	155	0.93
Total votes		16,735	100.00
Democratic hold			

==== Results by county ====
Results by county
County	Drew		Redman		Biscoe		Gibson		Pike		Others		Total
County	Votes	%	Votes	%	Votes	%	Votes	%	Votes	%	Votes	%	Total
Arkansas	101	100.00%	0	0.00%	0	0.00%	0	0.00%	0	0.00%	0	0.00%	101
Benton	472	100.00%	0	0.00%	0	0.00%	0	0.00%	0	0.00%	0	0.00%	472
Bradley	192	81.36%	0	0.00%	0	0.00%	19	8.05%	0	0.00%	25	10.59%	236
Carroll	577	100.00%	0	0.00%	0	0.00%	0	0.00%	0	0.00%	0	0.00%	577
Chicot	197	95.17%	0	0.00%	0	0.00%	0	0.00%	0	0.00%	10	4.83%	207
Clark	293	76.90%	0	0.00%	83	21.78%	0	0.00%	0	0.00%	5	1.31%	381
Conway	308	86.76%	0	0.00%	0	0.00%	29	8.17%	0	0.00%	18	5.07%	355
Crawford	860	95.77%	0	0.00%	0	0.00%	0	0.00%	0	0.00%	38	4.23%	898
Crittenden	315	48.69%	332	51.31%	0	0.00%	0	0.00%	0	0.00%	0	0.00%	647
Dallas	388	82.91%	0	0.00%	80	17.09%	0	0.00%	0	0.00%	0	0.00%	468
Desha	369	100.00%	0	0.00%	0	0.00%	0	0.00%	0	0.00%	0	0.00%	369
Drew	242	89.63%	0	0.00%	0	0.00%	28	10.37%	0	0.00%	0	0.00%	270
Franklin	No data (Note: Franklin, Fulton, Izard, Jackson, Lawrence, Marion and Pulaski counties did not report results.)												
Fulton	No data												
Greene	277	100.00%	0	0.00%	0	0.00%	0	0.00%	0	0.00%	0	0.00%	277
Hempstead	560	100.00%	0	0.00%	0	0.00%	0	0.00%	0	0.00%	0	0.00%	560
Hot Spring	305	100.00%	0	0.00%	0	0.00%	0	0.00%	0	0.00%	0	0.00%	305
Independence	678	100.00%	0	0.00%	0	0.00%	0	0.00%	0	0.00%	0	0.00%	678
Izard	No data												
Jackson	No data												
Jefferson	234	95.90%	0	0.00%	0	0.00%	0	0.00%	0	0.00%	10	4.10%	244
Johnson	687	94.63%	0	0.00%	0	0.00%	26	3.58%	0	0.00%	13	1.79%	726
Lafayette	173	98.86%	0	0.00%	0	0.00%	0	0.00%	0	0.00%	2	1.14%	175
Lawrence	No data												
Madison	541	100.00%	0	0.00%	0	0.00%	0	0.00%	0	0.00%	0	0.00%	541
Marion	No data												
Mississippi	258	100.00%	0	0.00%	0	0.00%	0	0.00%	0	0.00%	0	0.00%	258
Monroe	245	100.00%	0	0.00%	0	0.00%	0	0.00%	0	0.00%	0	0.00%	245
Montgomery	167	100.00%	0	0.00%	0	0.00%	0	0.00%	0	0.00%	0	0.00%	167
Newton	226	100.00%	0	0.00%	0	0.00%	0	0.00%	0	0.00%	0	0.00%	226
Ouachita	497	100.00%	0	0.00%	0	0.00%	0	0.00%	0	0.00%	0	0.00%	497
Perry	110	99.10%	0	0.00%	0	0.00%	1	0.90%	0	0.00%	0	0.00%	111
Phillips	517	100.00%	0	0.00%	0	0.00%	0	0.00%	0	0.00%	0	0.00%	517
Pike (Note: The results from Pike County were rejected and not counted towards the total.)	96	98.97%	0	0.00%	0	0.00%	0	0.00%	0	0.00%	1	1.03%	97
Poinsett	260	100.00%	0	0.00%	0	0.00%	0	0.00%	0	0.00%	0	0.00%	260
Polk	92	100.00%	0	0.00%	0	0.00%	0	0.00%	0	0.00%	0	0.00%	92
Pope	515	99.23%	0	0.00%	0	0.00%	2	0.39%	0	0.00%	2	0.39%	519
Prairie	207	100.00%	0	0.00%	0	0.00%	0	0.00%	0	0.00%	0	0.00%	207
Pulaski	No data												
Randolph	406	100.00%	0	0.00%	0	0.00%	0	0.00%	0	0.00%	0	0.00%	406
Saline	442	97.79%	0	0.00%	0	0.00%	10	2.21%	0	0.00%	0	0.00%	452
Scott	344	100.00%	0	0.00%	0	0.00%	0	0.00%	0	0.00%	0	0.00%	344
Searcy	182	100.00%	0	0.00%	0	0.00%	0	0.00%	0	0.00%	0	0.00%	182
Sevier	466	100.00%	0	0.00%	0	0.00%	0	0.00%	0	0.00%	0	0.00%	466
St. Francis	559	98.24%	0	0.00%	0	0.00%	0	0.00%	0	0.00%	10	1.76%	569
Union	759	86.64%	0	0.00%	0	0.00%	0	0.00%	104	11.87%	13	1.48%	876
Van Buren	312	100.00%	0	0.00%	0	0.00%	0	0.00%	0	0.00%	0	0.00%	312
Washington	910	99.67%	0	0.00%	0	0.00%	0	0.00%	0	0.00%	3	0.33%	913
White	239	100.00%	0	0.00%	0	0.00%	0	0.00%	0	0.00%	0	0.00%	239
Yell	384	98.46%	0	0.00%	0	0.00%	0	0.00%	0	0.00%	6	1.54%	390
Total	15,866	94.81%	332	1.98%	163	0.97%	115	0.69%	104	0.62%	155	0.93%	16735
