= 1852 Arkansas gubernatorial election =

- August 2, 1852
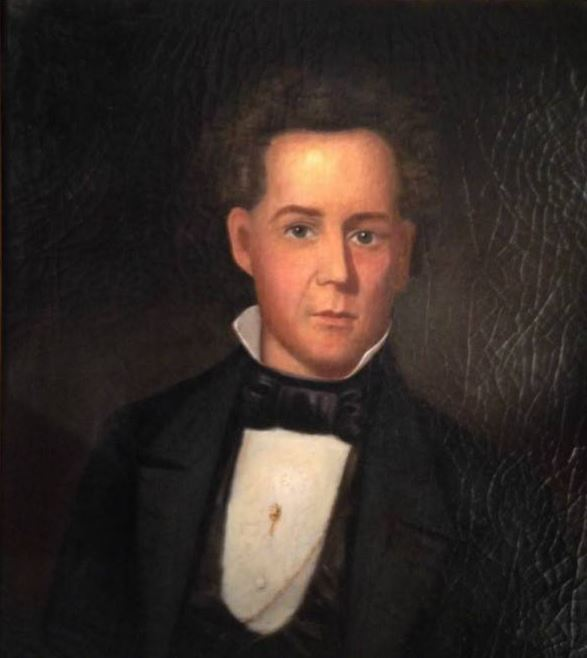

Candidate	Elias Nelson Conway	B. H. Smithson
Party	Democratic	Whig
Popular vote	15,442	12,414
Percentage	55.43%	44.56%
- Conway: 50%-60% 60%-70% 70%-80% 80%-90% 90%-100% Smithson: 50%-60% 60%-70% 70%-80% 80%-90% No data
Governor before election
John Selden Roane
Democratic
Elected Governor
Elias Nelson Conway
Democratic

The 1852 Arkansas gubernatorial election was held on August 2, 1852, in order to elect the Governor of Arkansas. Democratic nominee and former Arkansas State Auditor Elias Nelson Conway defeated Whig nominee B. H. Smithson.

== General election ==
On election day, August 2, 1852, Democratic nominee Elias Nelson Conway won the election by a margin of 3,028 votes against his opponent Whig nominee B. H. Smithson, thereby retaining Democratic control over the office of Governor. Conway was sworn in as the 5th Governor of Arkansas on November 15, 1852.

=== Results ===
1852 Arkansas gubernatorial election
Party	Candidate	Votes	%
Democratic	Elias Nelson Conway	15,442	55.43
Whig	B. H. Smithson	12,414	44.56
Write-in	C. F. M. Noland	1	0.00
Total votes		27,857	100.00
Democratic hold			

==== Results by county ====
Results by county
County	Elias Nelson Conway		B. H. Smithson		C. F. M. Noland		Total
County	Votes	%	Votes	%	Votes	%	Total
Arkansas	216	56.25%	168	43.75%	0	0.00%	384
Ashley	211	64.53%	116	35.47%	0	0.00%	327
Benton (Note: Benton, Madison, and Newton counties did not report results in time to be counted towards the total.) (Note: In Benton County, the source only includes the number of votes for Smithson, with the note that he won with a majority.)			366				
Bradley	271	53.66%	234	46.34%	0	0.00%	505
Calhoun	223	75.34%	73	24.66%	0	0.00%	296
Carroll	390	50.39%	384	49.61%	0	0.00%	774
Chicot	189	75.60%	61	24.40%	0	0.00%	250
Clark	290	42.77%	388	57.23%	0	0.00%	678
Conway	422	74.56%	144	25.44%	0	0.00%	566
Crawford	87	12.59%	604	87.41%	0	0.00%	691
Crittenden	163	53.97%	139	46.03%	0	0.00%	302
Dallas	344	63.94%	194	36.06%	0	0.00%	538
Desha	243	58.55%	172	41.45%	0	0.00%	415
Drew	247	55.26%	200	44.74%	0	0.00%	447
Franklin	164	28.03%	421	71.97%	0	0.00%	585
Fulton	230	78.50%	63	21.50%	0	0.00%	293
Greene	301	86.74%	46	13.26%	0	0.00%	347
Hempstead	352	40.79%	511	59.21%	0	0.00%	863
Hot Spring	348	59.49%	237	40.51%	0	0.00%	585
Independence	775	65.68%	405	34.32%	0	0.00%	1180
Izard	438	87.25%	64	12.75%	0	0.00%	502
Jackson	463	58.39%	330	41.61%	0	0.00%	793
Jefferson	414	63.99%	233	36.01%	0	0.00%	647
Johnson	244	33.42%	486	66.58%	0	0.00%	730
Lafayette	285	60.64%	185	39.36%	0	0.00%	470
Lawrence	657	78.59%	179	21.41%	0	0.00%	836
Madison	345	49.86%	347	50.14%	0	0.00%	692
Marion	238	57.63%	175	42.37%	0	0.00%	413
Mississippi	200	86.58%	31	13.42%	0	0.00%	231
Monroe	173	59.25%	119	40.75%	0	0.00%	292
Montgomery	123	37.85%	202	62.15%	0	0.00%	325
Newton	145	43.94%	185	56.06%	0	0.00%	330
Ouachita	501	50.91%	483	49.09%	0	0.00%	984
Perry	155	86.11%	25	13.89%	0	0.00%	180
Phillips	490	57.24%	366	42.76%	0	0.00%	856
Pike	193	62.46%	116	37.54%	0	0.00%	309
Poinsett	390	94.43%	23	5.57%	0	0.00%	413
Polk	174	72.80%	65	27.20%	0	0.00%	239
Pope	276	43.40%	360	56.60%	0	0.00%	636
Prairie	284	60.55%	185	39.45%	0	0.00%	469
Pulaski	382	48.72%	401	51.15%	1	0.13%	784
Randolph	349	89.95%	39	10.05%	0	0.00%	388
Saline	339	56.69%	259	43.31%	0	0.00%	598
Scott	211	45.09%	257	54.91%	0	0.00%	468
Searcy	165	42.09%	227	57.91%	0	0.00%	392
Sebastian	362	51.94%	335	48.06%	0	0.00%	697
Sevier	251	45.97%	295	54.03%	0	0.00%	546
St. Francis	406	62.85%	240	37.15%	0	0.00%	646
Union	673	58.07%	486	41.93%	0	0.00%	1159
Van Buren	285	77.24%	84	22.76%	0	0.00%	369
Washington	220	15.85%	1168	84.15%	0	0.00%	1388
White	354	69.01%	159	30.99%	0	0.00%	513
Yell	281	50.36%	277	49.64%	0	0.00%	558
Total	15,442	55.43%	12,414	44.56%	1	0.00%	27,857
