= 1844 Arkansas gubernatorial election =

- August 5, 1844
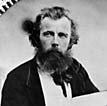

Candidate	Thomas S. Drew	Lorenzo Gibson	Richard C. Byrd
Party	Democratic	Whig	Independent
Popular vote	8,859	7,245	2,514
Percentage	47.59%	38.91%	13.50%
- Drew: 30%-40% 40%-50% 50%-60% 60%-70% 70%-80% Gibson: 40%-50% 50%-60% 60%-70% Byrd: 40%-50% 50%-60% 60%-70% No votes
Governor before election
Samuel Adams (acting)
Democratic
Elected Governor
Thomas S. Drew
Democratic

The 1844 Arkansas gubernatorial election was held on August 5, 1844, in order to elect the Governor of Arkansas. Democratic nominee Thomas S. Drew defeated Whig nominee Lorenzo Gibson and independent candidate Richard C. Byrd.

== General election ==
On election day, August 5, 1844, Democratic nominee Thomas S. Drew won the election by a margin of 1,614 votes against his foremost opponent Whig nominee Lorenzo Gibson, thereby retaining Democratic control over the office of Governor. Drew was sworn in as the 3rd Governor of Arkansas on November 5, 1844.

=== Results ===
1844 Arkansas gubernatorial election
Party	Candidate	Votes	%
Democratic	Thomas S. Drew	8,859	47.59
Whig	Lorenzo Gibson	7,245	38.91
Independent	Richard C. Byrd	2,514	13.50
Total votes		18,618	100.00
Democratic hold			

==== Results by county ====
Results by county
County	Thomas S. Drew		Lorenzo Gibson		Richard C. Byrd		Total
County	Votes	%	Votes	%	Votes	%	Total
Arkansas	90	41.28%	93	42.66%	35	16.06%	218
Benton	320	65.44%	125	25.56%	44	9.00%	489
Bradley	145	44.89%	155	47.99%	23	7.12%	323
Carroll	167	33.87%	127	25.76%	199	40.37%	493
Chicot	126	35.80%	226	64.20%	0	0.00%	352
Clark	202	44.69%	209	46.24%	41	9.07%	452
Conway	214	41.55%	203	39.42%	98	19.03%	515
Crawford	506	53.94%	389	41.47%	43	4.58%	938
Crittenden	102	36.04%	119	42.05%	62	21.91%	283
Desha	29	11.65%	154	61.85%	66	26.51%	249
Franklin	187	44.00%	190	44.71%	48	11.29%	425
Fulton	135	64.29%	46	21.90%	29	13.81%	210
Greene	130	42.35%	101	32.90%	76	24.76%	307
Hempstead	390	51.38%	342	45.06%	27	3.56%	759
Hot Spring	80	36.70%	113	51.83%	25	11.47%	218
Independence	370	49.47%	359	47.99%	19	2.54%	748
Izard	166	63.12%	69	26.24%	28	10.65%	263
Jackson	186	55.03%	145	42.90%	7	2.07%	338
Jefferson	105	40.54%	123	47.49%	31	11.97%	259
Johnson	395	65.40%	173	28.64%	36	5.96%	604
Lafayette	86	45.26%	85	44.74%	19	10.00%	190
Lawrence	304	54.58%	211	37.88%	42	7.54%	557
Madison	313	61.49%	110	21.61%	86	16.90%	509
Marion	40	18.96%	57	27.01%	114	54.03%	211
Mississippi	48	28.92%	78	46.99%	40	24.10%	166
Monroe	52	28.89%	93	51.67%	35	19.44%	180
Montgomery	69	37.10%	53	28.49%	64	34.41%	186
Newton	67	29.00%	69	29.87%	95	41.13%	231
Ouachita	157	39.85%	221	56.09%	16	4.06%	394
Perry	63	39.38%	77	48.13%	20	12.50%	160
Phillips	278	44.62%	304	48.80%	41	6.58%	623
Pike	105	64.02%	29	17.68%	30	18.29%	164
Poinsett	113	59.79%	40	21.16%	36	19.05%	189
Pope	323	53.30%	257	42.41%	26	4.29%	606
Pulaski	335	38.68%	437	50.46%	94	10.85%	866
Randolph	302	78.44%	52	13.51%	31	8.05%	385
Saline	195	53.57%	154	42.31%	15	4.12%	364
Scott	37	14.74%	42	16.73%	172	68.53%	251
Searcy	9	4.17%	80	37.04%	127	58.80%	216
Sevier	250	46.73%	159	29.72%	126	23.55%	535
St. Francis	200	46.73%	128	29.91%	100	23.36%	428
Union	319	54.25%	240	40.82%	29	4.93%	588
Unorganized (Note: A small area between Montgomery and Yell counties was not part of any county at the time and therefore is reported as having no votes.)	0	0.00%	0	0.00%	0	0.00%	0
Van Buren	107	39.48%	71	26.20%	93	34.32%	271
Washington	759	58.88%	503	39.02%	27	2.09%	1,289
White	79	32.64%	163	67.36%	0	0.00%	242
Yell	204	54.55%	71	18.98%	99	26.47%	374
Total	8,859	47.59%	7,245	38.91%	2,514	13.50%	18,618
