= Governor Byrd =

Governor Byrd may refer to:

- Charles Willing Byrd (1770–1828), Acting Governor of the Northwest Territory
- Harry F. Byrd (1887–1966), 50th Governor of Virginia
- Richard C. Byrd (1805–1854), Acting Governor of Arkansas

== See also ==
- William Wilberforce Bird (governor) (1784–1857), Acting Governor General of India
