= Mount Holly Cemetery =

Historic cemetery in Arkansas, United States

- U.S. National Register of Historic Places
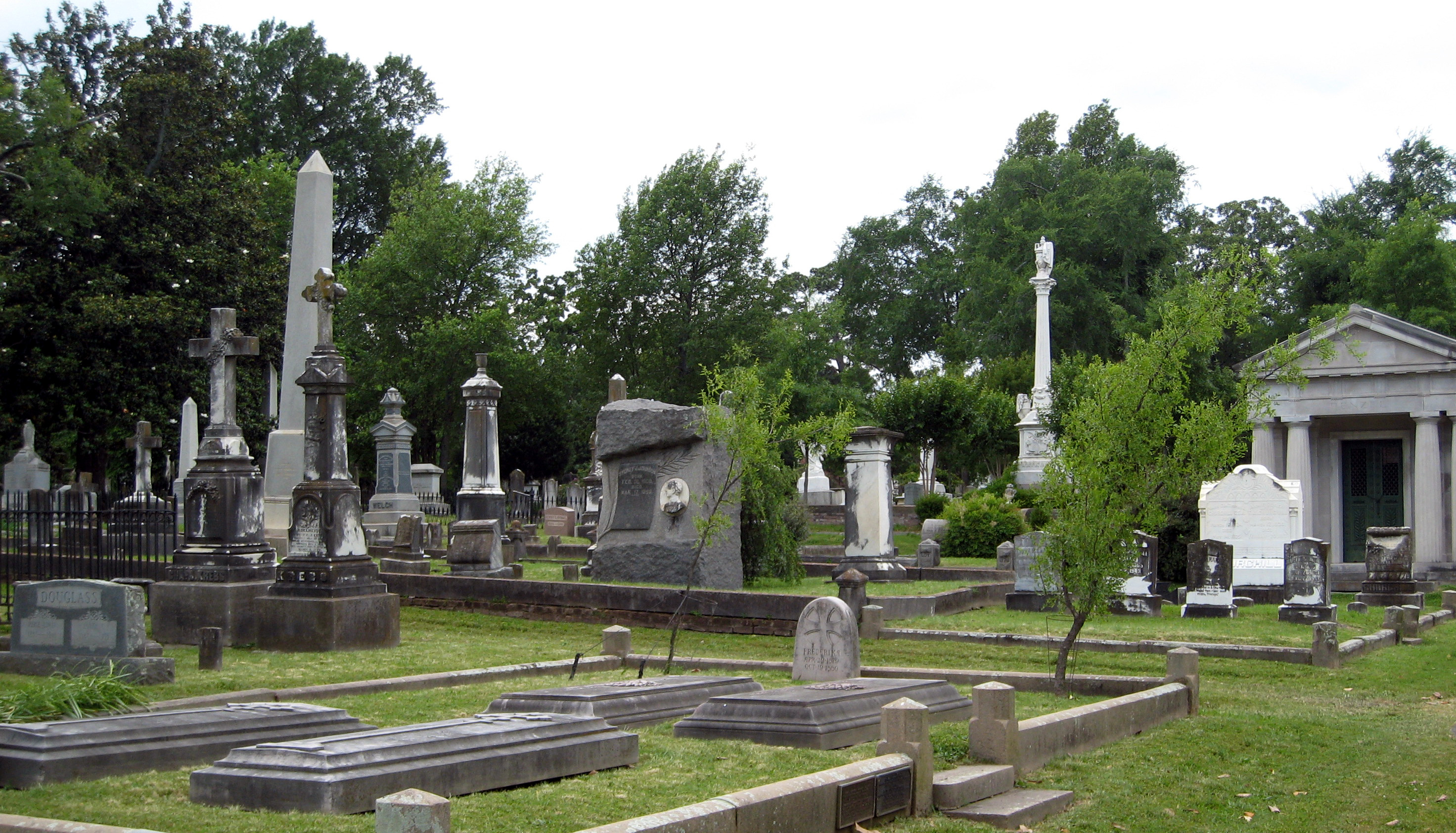
- Mount Holly Cemetery in May 2008

- Location within Arkansas Location within the United States
- Location: 1200 S. Broadway St., Little Rock, Arkansas
- Coordinates: 34°44′15.3″N 92°16′42.5″W
- Built: February 23, 1843; 183 years ago
- Website: mounthollycemetery.org
- NRHP reference No.: 70000125
- Added to NRHP: March 5, 1970

Mount Holly Cemetery is a historic cemetery located in the Quapaw Quarter area of downtown Little Rock in the U.S. state of Arkansas, and is the burial place for numerous Arkansans of note. It was listed on the National Register of Historic Places in 1970 and has been nicknamed "The Westminster Abbey of Arkansas".

== Major events ==
=== "Tales of the Crypt" ===
Every year in October several drama students from Parkview Arts and Science Magnet High School are each given a person buried in the cemetery to research. They then prepare short monologues or dialogues, complete with period costumes, to be performed in front of the researched person's grave. Audiences are led through the cemetery from grave to grave by guides with candles. The event is called "Tales of the Crypt". Although it takes place around the same time as the American holiday Halloween, the event is meant to be historic rather than spooky.

=== 2016 vandalism ===
The cemetery experienced heavy vandalism in the overnight hours of April 20, 2016. Numerous headstones were toppled and smashed, including the well-known statues of a mourner next to statues of two little girls.

== Notable burials ==
The cemetery is the burial place for ten former Arkansas governors, seven United States senators, 14 Arkansas Supreme Court justices, 21 Little Rock mayors, numerous Arkansas literary figures, Confederate generals, and other worthies. There are also several slaves who are buried there, marked by modest gravestones.

- Samuel Adams (1805–1850), Acting Governor of Arkansas (1844)
- Dale Alford (1916–2000), U.S. Representative (1959–63) and ophthalmologist
- Chester Ashley (1791–1848), U.S. Senator (1844–1848)
- W. Jasper Blackburn (1820–1899), U.S. Representative from Louisiana (1868–1869)
- Solon Borland (1811–1864) cenotaph, physician and U.S. Senator (1848–1853)
- Thomas James Churchill (1824–1905), Confederate Major General, 13th Governor of Arkansas (1881–1883)
- Elias Nelson Conway (1812–1892), 5th Governor of Arkansas (1852–1860)
- Dr. Matthew Cunningham (1782-1854), first Mayor of Little Rock, first physician in Little Rock
- Jeff Davis (1862–1913), 20th Governor of Arkansas (1901–1907), U.S. Senator (1907–1913)
- David O. Dodd (1846–1864), boy martyr of the Confederacy
- James Philip Eagle (1837–1904), 25th Speaker of the Arkansas House of Representatives (1885–1887) and 16th Governor of Arkansas (1889–1893)
- James Fleming Fagan (1828–1893), Confederate Major General
- Sandford C. Faulkner (1803–1874), the original 'Arkansas Traveller'
- John Gould Fletcher (1886–1950), Pulitzer Prize–winning poet, with his wife, noted children's book author Charlie May Simon (1897–1977)
- Thomas Fletcher (1817–1880), Acting Governor of Arkansas (1862)
- William S. Fulton (1795–1844), 4th and last Governor of Arkansas Territory (1835–1836), U.S. Senator from Arkansas (1836–1844)
- Augustus H. Garland (1876–1907), C.S. Senator (1862–1865), 11th Governor of Arkansas (1874–1877), U.S. Senator (1877–1885), 38th United States Attorney General (1885–1889)
- John N. Heiskell (1872–1972), U.S. Senator (1913) and editor of the Arkansas Gazette
- Simon P. Hughes Jr. (1830–1906), 15th Governor of Arkansas (1885–1889)
- George Izard (1776–1828), 2nd Governor of Arkansas Territory (1825–1828)
- Robert Ward Johnson (1814–1879), C.S. Senator from Arkansas (1862–1865)
- George R. Mann (1856–1939), architect of the Arkansas State Capitol
- William Read Miller (1823–1887), 12th Governor of Arkansas (1877–1881)
- Allison Nelson (1822–1862), 9th Mayor of Atlanta, Georgia (1855) and Confederate Brigadier General
- Thomas Willoughby Newton (1804–1853), U.S. Representative (1847)
- David Pryor (1934–2024), U.S. Representative (1966–1973), 39th Governor of Arkansas (1975–1979), U.S. Senator (1979–1997)
- Henry Rector (1816–1899), 6th Governor of Arkansas (1860–1862)
- Albert Rust (1818–1870), 7th Speaker of the Arkansas House of Representatives, U.S. Representative (1855–1857, 1859–1861) and Confederate Brigadier General
- Ambrose H. Sevier (1801–1848), U.S. Senator from Arkansas (1836–1848)
- Bernard Smith (1776–1835), U.S. Representative from New Jersey (1819–1821)
- David D. Terry (1881–1963), U.S. Representative (1933–1943)
- Jim Guy Tucker (1943-2025), U.S.Congressman, he served as 43rd Governor of Arkansas
- Cephas Washburn (1793–1860), missionary
- Edward Washburn (1831–1860), artist
- Jeanne Fox Weinmann (1874–1962), President National of the U.S. Daughters of 1812 and President General of the United Daughters of the Confederacy
- Frank D. White (1933–2003), 41st Governor of Arkansas (1981–1983)
- William W. Wilshire (1830–1888), Chief Justice of the Arkansas Supreme Court (1868–1871) and U.S. Congressman (1873–1877)
- William E. Woodruff (1795–1885), first Treasurer of Arkansas (1836–1838) and founder of the Arkansas Gazette

== See also ==
- National Register of Historic Places listings in Little Rock, Arkansas
