= 1880 Arkansas gubernatorial election =

- September 6, 1880
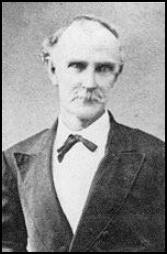

Nominee	Thomas James Churchill	William Pratt "Buck" Parks
Party	Democratic	Greenback
Popular vote	84,185	31,424
Percentage	72.82%	27.18%
- County results Churchill: 50%-60% 60%-70% 70%-80% 80%-90% 90%-100% Parks: 50%-60% 60%-70%
Governor before election
William Read Miller
Democratic
Elected Governor
Thomas James Churchill
Democratic

The 1880 Arkansas gubernatorial election was held on September 6, 1880, in order to elect the Governor of Arkansas. Democratic nominee and incumbent Treasurer of Arkansas Thomas James Churchill defeated Greenback nominee William Pratt "Buck" Parks.

== General election ==
On election day, September 6, 1880, Democratic nominee Thomas James Churchill won the election by a margin of 52,761 votes against his opponent Greenback nominee William Pratt "Buck" Parks, thereby retaining Democratic control over the office of Governor. Churchill was sworn in as the 13th Governor of Arkansas on January 13, 1881.

=== Results ===
1880 Arkansas gubernatorial election
Party	Candidate	Votes	%
Democratic	Thomas James Churchill	84,185	72.82
Greenback	William Pratt "Buck" Parks	31,424	27.18
Total votes		105,609	100.00
Democratic hold			

==== Results by county ====
Results by county
County	Thomas James Churchill		William Pratt "Buck" Parks		Total
County	Votes	%	Votes	%	Total
Arkansas	999	56.79%	760	43.21%	1759
Ashley	778	62.74%	462	37.26%	1240
Baxter	786	89.12%	96	10.88%	882
Benton	2099	79.39%	545	20.61%	2644
Boone	1625	93.50%	113	6.50%	1738
Bradley	546	73.19%	200	26.81%	746
Calhoun	527	61.42%	331	38.58%	858
Carroll	1126	95.83%	49	4.17%	1175
Chicot	232	100.00%	0	0.00%	232
Clark	1286	70.89%	528	29.11%	1814
Clay	1034	96.10%	42	3.90%	1076
Columbia	1247	67.70%	595	32.30%	1842
Conway	1086	50.61%	1060	49.39%	2146
Craighead	1216	96.13%	49	3.87%	1265
Crawford	1387	55.00%	1135	45.00%	2522
Crittenden	2322	100.00%	0	0.00%	2322
Cross	825	100.00%	0	0.00%	825
Dallas	488	62.09%	298	37.91%	786
Desha	582	93.12%	43	6.88%	625
Dorsey (Note: Dorsey County was later renamed Cleveland County.)	670	49.78%	676	50.22%	1346
Drew	1007	69.26%	447	30.74%	1454
Faulkner	1449	66.29%	737	33.71%	2186
Franklin	1754	77.23%	517	22.77%	2271
Fulton	828	90.79%	84	9.21%	912
Garland	1315	75.19%	434	24.81%	1749
Grant	811	84.39%	150	15.61%	961
Greene	1138	100.00%	0	0.00%	1138
Hempstead	1711	49.08%	1775	50.92%	3486
Hot Spring	864	74.93%	289	25.07%	1153
Howard	932	70.29%	394	29.71%	1326
Independence	2608	92.84%	201	7.16%	2809
Izard	1471	92.87%	113	7.13%	1584
Jackson	1597	75.40%	521	24.60%	2118
Jefferson	1269	99.45%	7	0.55%	1276
Johnson	1250	64.53%	687	35.47%	1937
Lafayette	355	35.29%	651	64.71%	1006
Lawrence	1421	96.80%	47	3.20%	1468
Lee	1770	99.94%	1	0.06%	1771
Lincoln	620	72.68%	233	27.32%	853
Little River	682	61.39%	429	38.61%	1111
Logan	1396	58.36%	996	41.64%	2392
Lonoke	1322	66.84%	656	33.16%	1978
Madison	830	55.89%	655	44.11%	1485
Marion	922	84.51%	169	15.49%	1091
Miller	936	95.71%	42	4.29%	978
Mississippi	1168	99.15%	10	0.85%	1178
Monroe	1023	53.23%	899	46.77%	1922
Montgomery	799	91.52%	74	8.48%	873
Nevada	1052	44.28%	1324	55.72%	2376
Newton	430	56.36%	333	43.64%	763
Ouachita	989	50.05%	987	49.95%	1976
Perry	397	60.70%	257	39.30%	654
Phillips	1644	99.40%	10	0.60%	1654
Pike	528	58.73%	371	41.27%	899
Poinsett	429	99.08%	4	0.92%	433
Polk	736	94.97%	39	5.03%	775
Pope	1339	69.99%	574	30.01%	1913
Prairie	999	67.55%	480	32.45%	1479
Pulaski	2471	52.26%	2257	47.74%	4728
Randolph	1820	98.86%	21	1.14%	1841
Saline	1121	72.09%	434	27.91%	1555
Scott	949	65.67%	496	34.33%	1445
Searcy	538	49.45%	550	50.55%	1088
Sebastian	1835	90.44%	194	9.56%	2029
Sevier	687	93.09%	51	6.91%	738
Sharp	1308	94.17%	81	5.83%	1389
St. Francis	968	99.49%	5	0.51%	973
Stone	776	97.49%	20	2.51%	796
Union	1111	60.31%	731	39.69%	1842
Van Buren	1329	91.59%	122	8.41%	1451
Washington	1891	54.83%	1558	45.17%	3449
White	2223	75.15%	735	24.85%	2958
Woodruff	916	49.81%	923	50.19%	1839
Yell	1590	70.45%	667	29.55%	2257
Total	84185	72.82%	31424	27.18%	115609
