= 1904 Arkansas gubernatorial election =

- September 5, 1904
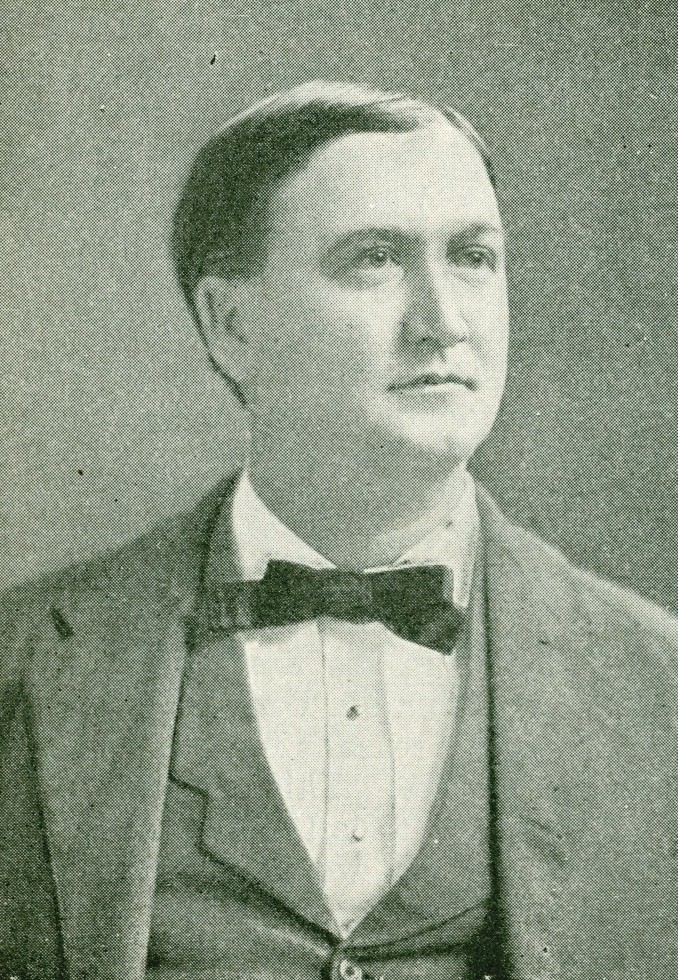

Nominee	Jeff Davis	Harry H. Myers
Party	Democratic	Republican
Popular vote	90,263	53,898
Percentage	60.97%	36.41%
- County results Davis: 40–50% 50–60% 60–70% 70–80% 80–90% Myers: 50–60% 60–70%
Governor before election
Jeff Davis
Democratic
Elected Governor
Jeff Davis
Democratic

The 1904 Arkansas gubernatorial election was held on September 5, 1904, in order to elect the Governor of Arkansas. Democratic nominee and incumbent Governor Jeff Davis won re-election against Republican nominee Harry H. Myers in a rematch of the previous election.

== General election ==
On election day, September 5, 1904, Democratic nominee Jeff Davis won re-election by a margin of 36,365 votes against his foremost opponent Republican nominee Harry H. Myers, thereby retaining Democratic control over the office of Governor. Davis was sworn in for his third term on January 18, 1905.

=== Results ===
1904 Arkansas gubernatorial election
Party	Candidate	Votes	%
Democratic	Jeff Davis (incumbent)	90,263	60.97
Republican	Harry H. Myers	53,898	36.41
Prohibition	J.E. Wilmans	2,527	1.71
Socialist	William Penrose	1,364	0.92
Total votes		148,052	100.00
Democratic hold			
