= List of governors of Arkansas =

Governor of Arkansas
- Seal of Arkansas

- Flag of Arkansas

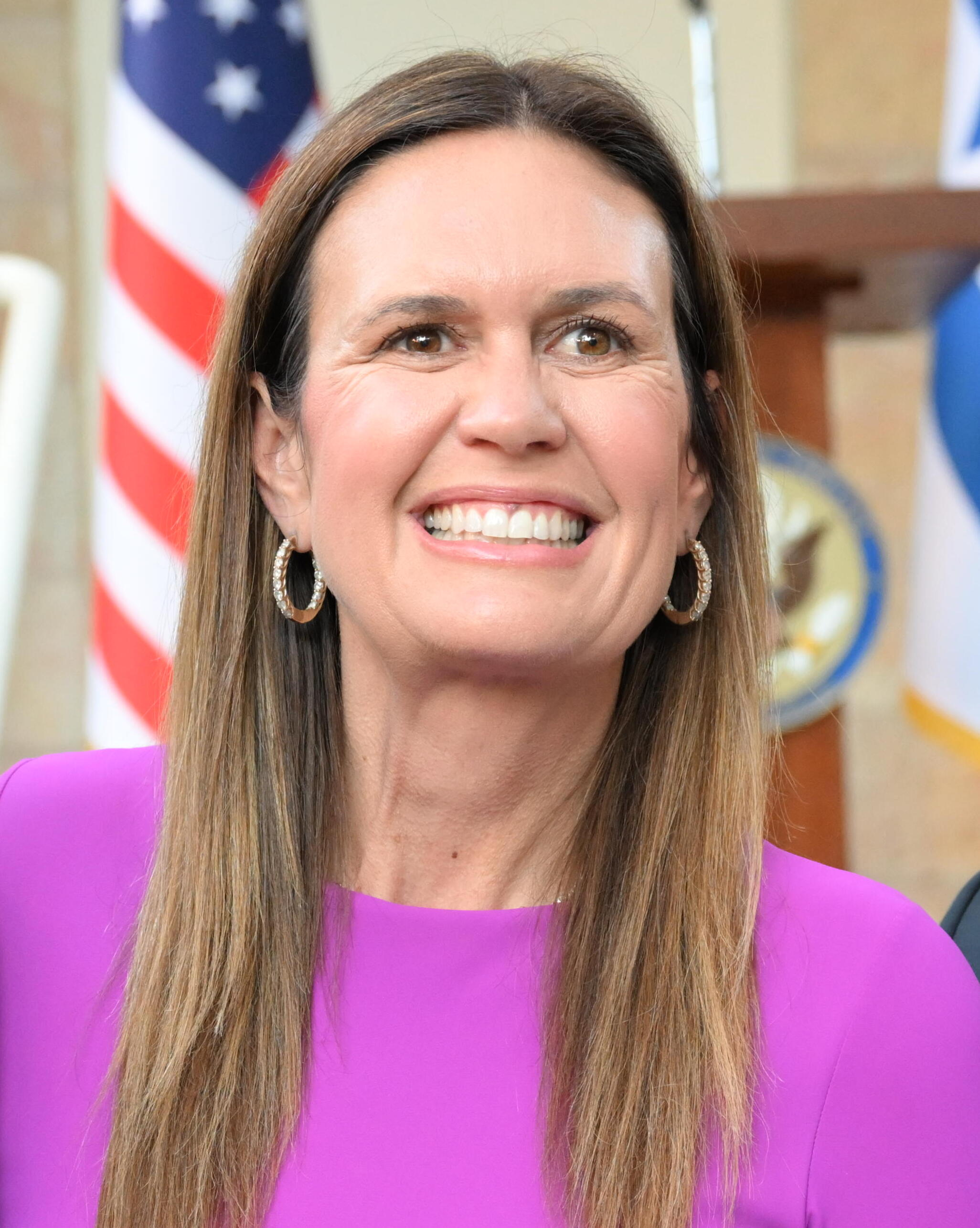
- Incumbent; Sarah Huckabee Sanders since January 10, 2023
- Government of Arkansas
- Style: Governor (informal); The Honorable (formal)
- Status: Head of government
- Residence: Arkansas Governor's Mansion
- Seat: State Capitol, Little Rock, Arkansas
- Term length: Four years, renewable once
- Constituting instrument: Constitution of Arkansas
- Precursor: Governor of Arkansas Territory
- Inaugural holder: James Sevier Conway
- Formation: September 13, 1836 (190 years ago)
- Succession: Line of succession
- Deputy: Lieutenant Governor of Arkansas
- Salary: $158,739 (2022)
- Website: governor.arkansas.gov

The governor of Arkansas is the head of government of the U.S. state of Arkansas. The governor is the head of the executive branch of the Arkansas government and is charged with enforcing state laws. They have the power to either approve or veto bills passed by the Arkansas General Assembly, to convene the legislature, and to grant pardons, except in cases of treason and impeachment.

The state has had 46 elected governors, as well as 11 acting governors who assumed powers and duties following the resignation or death of the governor. Before becoming a state, Arkansas Territory had four governors appointed to it by the president of the United States. Orval Faubus (1955–1967) served the longest term as governor, being elected six times to serve 12 years. Bill Clinton (1979–1981; 1983–1992), elected five times over two distinct terms, fell only one month short of 12 years, and Mike Huckabee (1996–2007) served 10 years for two full four-year terms. The shortest term for an elected governor was the 38 days served by John S. Little before his nervous breakdown; one of the acting successors to his term, Jesse M. Martin, took office only three days before the end of the term, the shortest term overall.

The current governor of Arkansas is Republican Sarah Huckabee Sanders, who was sworn in on January 10, 2023.

== List of governors ==
=== Arkansas Territory ===
Arkansaw Territory (renamed Arkansas Territory around 1822) was split from Missouri Territory on July 4, 1819. As territorial secretary from 1819 to 1829, Robert Crittenden served as acting governor whenever the appointed governor was not in the state. This meant that Crittenden was the first person to perform the duties of governor, since James Miller did not arrive in the territory until nine months after his appointment.

Governors of the Territory of Arkansas
No.	Governor	Term in office (Note: The range given is from the date the governor was confirmed by the Senate, or appointed by the President during a Senate recess, to the date the governor's successor was confirmed, unless noted.)	Appointed by
1	James Miller (1776–1851)	March 3, 1819 (Note: Miller was nominated, and confirmed by the Senate, on March 3, 1819. However, to avoid the hot southern summer, he delayed his departure from New Hampshire until September, and took an indirect route, finally arriving in the territory on December 26. Robert Crittenden, secretary of the territory, served as acting governor while Miller was delayed. Miller was reconfirmed by the Senate on January 3, 1823.) – December 27, 1824 (2127 days; resigned) (Note: Miller resigned citing poor health; at the time of his resignation, he had been absent from the territory for 18 months.)	James Monroe
2	George Izard (1776–1828)	March 3, 1825 (Note: Izard was nominated on February 22, 1825, confirmed by the Senate on March 3, and took office on May 31. Until he arrived in the territory, Robert Crittenden, secretary of the territory, served as acting governor, though Crittenden himself was out of state when Izard arrived. Izard was reconfirmed by the Senate on January 9, 1828.) – November 22, 1828 (1361 days; died in office)	James Monroe
2	George Izard (1776–1828)	March 3, 1825 – November 22, 1828 (1361 days; died in office)	John Quincy Adams
3	John Pope (1770–1845)	March 9, 1829 (Note: By the time notice of Izard's death reached Washington, D.C., Andrew Jackson had been elected president, and the United States Senate refused to approve John Quincy Adams's choice for governor, Hutchins Gordon Burton, whom he had nominated on January 6, 1829. Pope was nominated, and confirmed by the Senate, on March 9, 1829, and took office on May 31. Pope was reconfirmed by the Senate on March 23, 1832.) – March 9, 1835 (2192 days; replaced)	Andrew Jackson
4	William S. Fulton (1795–1844)	March 9, 1835 (Note: Fulton was nominated on February 2, 1835, and confirmed by the Senate on February 23, for a term to begin March 9. No contemporary reporting has been found as to when Fulton was sworn in, but one source refers to Pope saying his term would not end until March 28, and another notes Fulton's commission did not arrive until March 24, when he was out of state.) – September 13, 1836 (555 days; statehood) (Note: Fulton served as governor until statehood, when he was elected to the United States Senate.)	Andrew Jackson

=== State of Arkansas ===
Arkansas was admitted to the Union on June 15, 1836. The state seceded on May 6, 1861, and was admitted to the Confederacy on May 21, 1861. When Little Rock, the state capital, was captured on September 10, 1863, the state government relocated to Washington, Arkansas, and a Union government was installed in its place, causing an overlap in the terms of Confederate governor Harris Flanagin and Union governor Isaac Murphy. During the post-war Reconstruction period, it was part of the Fourth Military District. Arkansas was readmitted to the Union on June 22, 1868.

The Arkansas Constitution of 1836 established four-year terms for governors, which was lowered to two years in the 1874, and current, constitution. An amendment in 1984 increased the terms of both governor and lieutenant governor to four years. Governors were originally limited only to serving no more than eight out of every twelve years, but the 1874 constitution removed any term limit. A referendum in 1992 limited governors to two terms.

Until 1864, the constitutions provided that, should the office of governor be rendered vacant, the president of the senate would serve as acting governor until such time as a new governor was elected or the disability removed, or the acting governor's senate term expired. This led to some situations where the governorship changed hands in quick succession, due to senate terms ending or new senate presidents being elected. For example, after John S. Little resigned in 1907, three senate presidents acted as governors before the next elected governor took office.

The 1864 constitution created the office of lieutenant governor who would serve as acting governor in case of vacancy. The 1874 constitution removed the position and returned to the original line of succession. An amendment to the constitution, passed in 1914 but not recognized until 1925, recreated the office of lieutenant governor, who becomes governor in case of vacancy of the governor's office. The governor and the lieutenant governor are not officially elected on the same ticket.

Arkansas was a strongly Democratic state before the Civil War, electing only candidates from the Democratic party. It elected three Republican governors following Reconstruction, but after the Democratic Party re-established control, 92 years passed before voters chose another Republican.

Governors of the State of Arkansas
No. (Note: According to the numbering generally used, acting governors are not numbered.)	Governor	Term in office	Party	Election	Lt. Governor (Note: The office of lieutenant governor was created in 1864 and abolished in 1874. It was recreated in 1914, and was not filled until 1927. The amendment to the constitution creating the office was narrowly voted in by the electorate in 1914. The Speaker of the House declared that the measure had lost, because even though it had received the majority of the votes cast for that particular ballot measure, winning 45,567 to 45,206, it had not received the majority of votes cast across the whole election, determined by looking at the question on the ballot with the highest total number of votes for or against. On that ballot, this figure was 135,517 votes, so it was ruled that at least 67,758 votes in favor would have been required for the measure to pass, essentially counting blank votes as votes against. In 1925, it was discovered that a 1910 law amended this requirement such that only a majority of the votes on the specific question was required. Therefore, the 1914 initiative was declared to be valid.) (Note: Lieutenant governors represented the same party as their governor unless noted.)
1	James Sevier Conway (1796–1855)	September 13, 1836 – November 4, 1840 (1514 days; retired)	Democratic	1836	Office did not exist
2	Archibald Yell (1797–1847)	November 4, 1840 – April 29, 1844 (1273 days; resigned) (Note: Yell resigned to run successfully for the United States House of Representatives.)	Democratic	1840	Office did not exist
—	Samuel Adams (1805–1850)	April 29, 1844 – November 9, 1844 (195 days; retired) (Note: Adams was instead elected Treasurer of Arkansas.)	Democratic	President of the Senate acting	Office did not exist
3	Thomas S. Drew (1802–1879)	November 9, 1844 – January 10, 1849 (1524 days; resigned) (Note: Drew resigned due to the low salary he received as governor.)	Democratic	1844	Office did not exist
3	Thomas S. Drew (1802–1879)	November 9, 1844 – January 10, 1849 (1524 days; resigned)	Democratic	1848	Office did not exist
—	Richard C. Byrd (1805–1854)	January 10, 1849 – April 19, 1849 (100 days; retired)	Democratic	President of the Senate acting	Office did not exist
4	John Selden Roane (Note: Roane was out of state enough in 1851 that John Robinson Hampton, president of the Senate, was sworn in as acting governor on June 25, 1851. However, Sobel & Raimo state Hampton was acting governor in September 1851. No source has been found as to when Roane returned to active work.) (1817–1867)	April 19, 1849 – November 15, 1852 (1307 days; retired)	Democratic	1849 (special) (Note: Roane was elected in a special election to fill the remainder of the term vacated by Thomas S. Drew's resignation.)	Office did not exist
5	Elias Nelson Conway (Note: Conway was out of state in 1857, and president of the Senate John Robinson Hampton was sworn in as acting governor and served from April 21 to September 14.) (1812–1892)	November 15, 1852 – November 15, 1860 (2923 days; term-limited) (Note: Under the 1836 constitution, governors were not eligible to serve more than eight years in any term of twelve years.)	Democratic	1852	Office did not exist
5	Elias Nelson Conway (1812–1892)	November 15, 1852 – November 15, 1860 (2923 days; term-limited)	Democratic	1856	Office did not exist
6	Henry Rector (1816–1899)	November 15, 1860 – November 3, 1862 (719 days; resigned) (Note: Rector resigned two weeks before the end of his term, having lost reelection. Sources suggest he resigned because he was so badly defeated in the election, or because the new constitution would shorten his term.)	Independent; Democratic	1860 (Note: This term was shortened to two years due to the 1861 constitution moving the election schedule.)	Office did not exist
—	Thomas Fletcher (1817–1880) (Note: Sobel & Raimo's entry on Fletcher mixes information with a similarly named man who ran for governor twice; even contemporary sources would confuse the two.)	November 3, 1862 – November 15, 1862 (13 days; retired) (Note: Governor-elect Flanagin was not sworn in until November 15, 1862; in the interim, Fletcher acted as governor. Fletcher is omitted from most lists of Arkansas governors.)	Democratic	President of the Senate acting	Office did not exist
7	Harris Flanagin (1817–1874)	November 15, 1862 – June 1, 1865 (Note: Some sources state Flanagin left office on April 18, 1864, but that was when Isaac Murphy was sworn in as governor by occupation authorities after winning the 1864 election. Following the evacuation of Little Rock on September 10, 1863, Flanagin was governor in exile at Washington, Arkansas. Flanagin's last official act as governor was to preside over the Arkansas State Military Board during its final meeting at Washington on June 1, 1865; six days after the Trans-Mississippi Department was surrendered to Union authorities at New Orleans.) (930 days; government-in-exile disestablished) (Note: Flanagin evacuated Little Rock before it fell to Union forces on September 10, 1863, leading a government-in-exile at Washington, Arkansas, until the end of the Civil War. Isaac Murphy was sworn in as provisional governor by occupation authorities on January 20, 1864, and elected in his own right under Lincoln's "ten percent plan" (taking office on April 18, 1864), thus causing an overlap in terms.)	Independent	1862 (Note: On March 14, 1864, a new state constitution was ratified by Union men of Arkansas under President Lincoln's "ten percent plan" in an election supervised by Union occupation authorities; however, it had no effect on Flanagin's government-in-exile at Washington.)	Office did not exist
8	Isaac Murphy (d. 1882)	January 20, 1864 (Note: Murphy was chosen as provisional governor by the Unionist constitutional convention on January 20, 1864; he refused to exercise power until the constitution was ratified and he was elected by popular vote. He was formally inaugurated on April 18.) – July 2, 1868 (1626 days; retired)	Independent (Note: Sources disagree on Murphy's party: the state says Independent, Sobel & Raimo say Democratic, and Kallenbach says Union.)	Provisional governor appointed by constitutional convention	Office did not exist
8	Isaac Murphy (d. 1882)	January 20, 1864 – July 2, 1868 (1626 days; retired)	Independent	1864	Calvin C. Bliss
9	Powell Clayton (1833–1914)	July 2, 1868 – March 17, 1871 (989 days; resigned) (Note: Clayton resigned, having been elected to the United States Senate. He had delayed his resignation to prevent Lieutenant Governor Johnson from succeeding him; party machinations led to Johnson's resignation and acceptance of the office of secretary of state, so that Hadley, as president pro tempore of the senate, could act as governor for the remainder of the term.)	Republican	1868	James M. Johnson (resigned March 14, 1871)
9	Powell Clayton (1833–1914)	July 2, 1868 – March 17, 1871 (989 days; resigned)	Republican	1868	Vacant
—	Ozra Amander Hadley (1826–1915)	March 17, 1871 – January 6, 1873 (662 days, retired)	Republican	President of the Senate acting	Vacant
10	Elisha Baxter (Note: Baxter was ousted by Joseph Brooks on April 15, 1874, triggering the Brooks–Baxter War. He was reinstated on May 19.) (1827–1899)	January 6, 1873 – November 12, 1874 (676 days; retired) (Note: Baxter received the Democratic nomination, but declined.)	Republican	1872 (Note: First term under the 1874 constitution, which shortened terms to two years.)	Volney V. Smith
11	Augustus H. Garland (1832–1899)	November 12, 1874 – January 11, 1877 (792 days; retired) (Note: Garland was instead elected to the United States Senate.)	Democratic	1874	Office did not exist
12	William Read Miller (1823–1887)	January 11, 1877 – January 13, 1881 (1464 days; lost nomination)	Democratic	1876	Office did not exist
12	William Read Miller (1823–1887)	January 11, 1877 – January 13, 1881 (1464 days; lost nomination)	Democratic	1878	Office did not exist
13	Thomas James Churchill (1824–1905)	January 13, 1881 – January 13, 1883 (731 days; retired)	Democratic	1880	Office did not exist
14	James H. Berry (1841–1913)	January 13, 1883 – January 15, 1885 (734 days; retired)	Democratic	1882	Office did not exist
15	Simon P. Hughes Jr. (1830–1906)	January 15, 1885 – January 17, 1889 (1464 days; lost nomination)	Democratic	1884	Office did not exist
15	Simon P. Hughes Jr. (1830–1906)	January 15, 1885 – January 17, 1889 (1464 days; lost nomination)	Democratic	1886	Office did not exist
16	James Philip Eagle (1837–1904)	January 17, 1889 – January 14, 1893 (1459 days; retired)	Democratic	1888	Office did not exist
16	James Philip Eagle (1837–1904)	January 17, 1889 – January 14, 1893 (1459 days; retired)	Democratic	1890	Office did not exist
17	William Meade Fishback (Note: Fishback was out of state for a period in 1893; during that time, Clay Sloan, president of the Senate, acted as governor.) (1831–1903)	January 14, 1893 – January 18, 1895 (735 days; retired) (Note: Fishback instead ran unsuccessfully for the Democratic nomination for the United States Senate.)	Democratic	1892	Office did not exist
18	James P. Clarke (1854–1916)	January 18, 1895 – January 18, 1897 (732 days; retired) (Note: Clarke instead ran unsuccessfully for the Democratic nomination for the United States Senate.)	Democratic	1894	Office did not exist
19	Daniel Webster Jones (1839–1918)	January 18, 1897 – January 18, 1901 (1461 days; retired) (Note: Jones instead ran unsuccessfully for the Democratic nomination for the United States Senate.)	Democratic	1896	Office did not exist
19	Daniel Webster Jones (1839–1918)	January 18, 1897 – January 18, 1901 (1461 days; retired)	Democratic	1898	Office did not exist
20	Jeff Davis (1862–1913)	January 18, 1901 – January 18, 1907 (2192 days; retired) (Note: Davis was instead elected to the United States Senate.)	Democratic	1900	Office did not exist
20	Jeff Davis (1862–1913)	January 18, 1901 – January 18, 1907 (2192 days; retired)	Democratic	1902	Office did not exist
20	Jeff Davis (1862–1913)	January 18, 1901 – January 18, 1907 (2192 days; retired)	Democratic	1904	Office did not exist
21	John S. Little (1851–1916)	January 18, 1907 – February 11, 1907 (25 days; resigned) (Note: Little resigned after suffering a nervous breakdown soon after taking office.)	Democratic	1906	Office did not exist
—	John Isaac Moore (1856–1937)	February 11, 1907 – May 14, 1907 (93 days; legislature adjourned)	Democratic	President of the Senate acting (Note: President of the Senate Moore acted as governor until the legislature adjourned, at which time a new president pro tempore of the Senate was chosen, Pindall, who acted as governor until his senate term expired. For the remaining three days of the gubernatorial term, Martin, the new president pro tempore of the Senate, acted as governor. Further complicating the situation, Pindall was out of state from May 9 to May 14, 1908, during which time Allen Hamiter, speaker of the House, served as acting governor.)	Office did not exist
—	Xenophon Overton Pindall (1873–1935)	May 14, 1907 – January 11, 1909 (609 days; senate term expired)	Democratic	President of the Senate acting	Office did not exist
—	Jesse M. Martin (1877–1915)	January 11, 1909 – January 14, 1909 (4 days; retired)	Democratic	President of the Senate acting	Office did not exist
22	George Washington Donaghey (1856–1937)	January 14, 1909 – January 16, 1913 (1464 days; lost nomination)	Democratic	1908	Office did not exist
22	George Washington Donaghey (1856–1937)	January 14, 1909 – January 16, 1913 (1464 days; lost nomination)	Democratic	1910	Office did not exist
23	Joseph T. Robinson (1872–1937)	January 16, 1913 – March 8, 1913 (52 days; resigned) (Note: Robinson resigned, having been elected to the United States Senate.)	Democratic	1912	Office did not exist
—	William Kavanaugh Oldham (1865–1938)	March 8, 1913 – March 13, 1913 (6 days; new president of the senate elected)	Democratic	President of the Senate acting (Note: Oldham acted as governor for six days before a new president of the senate was elected. The new president, Futrell, acted as governor until Hays was elected in a special election to fill the remainder of the term. Conflict over whether or not Futrell could succeed Oldham as acting governor led to the Arkansas Supreme Court ruling that he could.)	Office did not exist
—	Junius Marion Futrell (1870–1955)	March 13, 1913 – August 6, 1913 (147 days; retired)	Democratic	President of the Senate acting	Office did not exist
24	George Washington Hays (1863–1927)	August 6, 1913 – January 10, 1917 (1254 days; retired)	Democratic	1913 (special)	Office did not exist
24	George Washington Hays (1863–1927)	August 6, 1913 – January 10, 1917 (1254 days; retired)	Democratic	1914	Office did not exist
25	Charles Hillman Brough (1876–1935)	January 10, 1917 – January 12, 1921 (1464 days; retired)	Democratic	1916	Office did not exist
25	Charles Hillman Brough (1876–1935)	January 10, 1917 – January 12, 1921 (1464 days; retired)	Democratic	1918	Office did not exist
26	Thomas C. McRae (1851–1929)	January 12, 1921 – January 14, 1925 (1464 days; retired)	Democratic	1920	Office did not exist
26	Thomas C. McRae (1851–1929)	January 12, 1921 – January 14, 1925 (1464 days; retired)	Democratic	1922	Office did not exist
27	Tom Terral (1882–1946)	January 14, 1925 – January 11, 1927 (728 days; lost nomination)	Democratic	1924	Office did not exist
28	John Ellis Martineau (1873–1937)	January 11, 1927 – March 14, 1928 (429 days; resigned) (Note: Martineau resigned, having been confirmed to the United States District Court for the Eastern District of Arkansas.)	Democratic	1926	Harvey Parnell
29	Harvey Parnell (1880–1936)	March 14, 1928 – January 10, 1933 (1764 days; retired)	Democratic	Succeeded from lieutenant governor	Vacant
29	Harvey Parnell (1880–1936)	March 14, 1928 – January 10, 1933 (1764 days; retired)	Democratic	1928	Lee Cazort
29	Harvey Parnell (1880–1936)	March 14, 1928 – January 10, 1933 (1764 days; retired)	Democratic	1930	Lawrence Elery Wilson
30	Junius Marion Futrell (1870–1955)	January 10, 1933 – January 12, 1937 (1464 days; retired)	Democratic	1932	Lee Cazort
30	Junius Marion Futrell (1870–1955)	January 10, 1933 – January 12, 1937 (1464 days; retired)	Democratic	1934	Lee Cazort
31	Carl E. Bailey (1894–1948)	January 12, 1937 – January 14, 1941 (1464 days; lost nomination)	Democratic	1936	Robert L. Bailey
31	Carl E. Bailey (1894–1948)	January 12, 1937 – January 14, 1941 (1464 days; lost nomination)	Democratic	1938	Robert L. Bailey
32	Homer Martin Adkins (1890–1964)	January 14, 1941 – January 9, 1945 (1457 days; retired) (Note: Adkins instead ran unsuccessfully for the Democratic nomination for the United States Senate.)	Democratic	1940	Robert L. Bailey
32	Homer Martin Adkins (1890–1964)	January 14, 1941 – January 9, 1945 (1457 days; retired)	Democratic	1942	James L. Shaver
33	Benjamin T. Laney (1896–1977)	January 9, 1945 – January 11, 1949 (1464 days; retired)	Democratic	1944	James L. Shaver
33	Benjamin T. Laney (1896–1977)	January 9, 1945 – January 11, 1949 (1464 days; retired)	Democratic	1946	Nathan Green Gordon
34	Sid McMath (1912–2003)	January 11, 1949 – January 13, 1953 (1464 days; lost nomination)	Democratic	1948	Nathan Green Gordon
34	Sid McMath (1912–2003)	January 11, 1949 – January 13, 1953 (1464 days; lost nomination)	Democratic	1950	Nathan Green Gordon
35	Francis Cherry (1908–1965)	January 13, 1953 – January 11, 1955 (729 days; lost nomination)	Democratic	1952	Nathan Green Gordon
36	Orval Faubus (1910–1994)	January 11, 1955 – January 10, 1967 (4383 days; retired)	Democratic	1954	Nathan Green Gordon
36	Orval Faubus (1910–1994)	January 11, 1955 – January 10, 1967 (4383 days; retired)	Democratic	1956	Nathan Green Gordon
36	Orval Faubus (1910–1994)	January 11, 1955 – January 10, 1967 (4383 days; retired)	Democratic	1958	Nathan Green Gordon
36	Orval Faubus (1910–1994)	January 11, 1955 – January 10, 1967 (4383 days; retired)	Democratic	1960	Nathan Green Gordon
36	Orval Faubus (1910–1994)	January 11, 1955 – January 10, 1967 (4383 days; retired)	Democratic	1962	Nathan Green Gordon
36	Orval Faubus (1910–1994)	January 11, 1955 – January 10, 1967 (4383 days; retired)	Democratic	1964	Nathan Green Gordon
37	Winthrop Rockefeller (1912–1973)	January 10, 1967 – January 12, 1971 (1464 days; lost election)	Republican	1966	Maurice Britt
37	Winthrop Rockefeller (1912–1973)	January 10, 1967 – January 12, 1971 (1464 days; lost election)	Republican	1968	Maurice Britt
38	Dale Bumpers (1925–2016)	January 12, 1971 – January 3, 1975 (1453 days; resigned) (Note: Bumpers resigned, having been elected to the United States Senate.)	Democratic	1970	Bob C. Riley
38	Dale Bumpers (1925–2016)	January 12, 1971 – January 3, 1975 (1453 days; resigned)	Democratic	1972	Bob C. Riley
—	Bob C. Riley (1924–1994)	January 3, 1975 – January 14, 1975 (12 days; retired)	Democratic	Succeeded from lieutenant governor	Vacant
39	David Pryor (1934–2024)	January 14, 1975 – January 3, 1979 (1451 days; resigned) (Note: Pryor resigned, having been elected to the United States Senate.)	Democratic	1974	Joe Purcell
39	David Pryor (1934–2024)	January 14, 1975 – January 3, 1979 (1451 days; resigned)	Democratic	1976	Joe Purcell
—	Joe Purcell (1923–1987)	January 3, 1979 – January 9, 1979 (7 days; retired)	Democratic	Succeeded from lieutenant governor	Vacant
40	Bill Clinton (b. 1946)	January 9, 1979 – January 13, 1981 (736 days; lost election)	Democratic	1978	Joe Purcell
41	Frank D. White (1933–2003)	January 13, 1981 – January 11, 1983 (729 days; lost election)	Republican	1980	Winston Bryant (Note: Represented the Democratic Party)
42	Bill Clinton (b. 1946)	January 11, 1983 – December 12, 1992 (3624 days; resigned) (Note: Clinton resigned, having been elected President of the United States.)	Democratic	1982	Winston Bryant
42	Bill Clinton (b. 1946)	January 11, 1983 – December 12, 1992 (3624 days; resigned)	Democratic	1984	Winston Bryant
42	Bill Clinton (b. 1946)	January 11, 1983 – December 12, 1992 (3624 days; resigned)	Democratic	1986 (Note: First term under a 1984 constitutional amendment, which lengthened terms to four years.)	Winston Bryant
42	Bill Clinton (b. 1946)	January 11, 1983 – December 12, 1992 (3624 days; resigned)	Democratic	1990	Jim Guy Tucker
43	Jim Guy Tucker (1943–2025)	December 12, 1992 – July 15, 1996 (1312 days; resigned) (Note: Tucker resigned after being convicted of mail fraud in the Whitewater controversy;)	Democratic	Succeeded from lieutenant governor	Vacant
43	Jim Guy Tucker (1943–2025)	December 12, 1992 – July 15, 1996 (1312 days; resigned)	Democratic	Succeeded from lieutenant governor	Mike Huckabee (Note: Represented the Republican Party) (elected November 20, 1993)
43	Jim Guy Tucker (1943–2025)	December 12, 1992 – July 15, 1996 (1312 days; resigned)	Democratic	1994	Mike Huckabee (elected November 20, 1993)
44	Mike Huckabee (b. 1955)	July 15, 1996 – January 9, 2007 (3831 days; term-limited) (Note: Under a 1993 amendment to the constitution, governors may not serve more than two terms.)	Republican	Succeeded from lieutenant governor	Vacant
44	Mike Huckabee (b. 1955)	July 15, 1996 – January 9, 2007 (3831 days; term-limited)	Republican	Succeeded from lieutenant governor	Winthrop Paul Rockefeller (elected November 19, 1996) (died July 16, 2006)
44	Mike Huckabee (b. 1955)	July 15, 1996 – January 9, 2007 (3831 days; term-limited)	Republican	1998	Winthrop Paul Rockefeller (elected November 19, 1996) (died July 16, 2006)
44	Mike Huckabee (b. 1955)	July 15, 1996 – January 9, 2007 (3831 days; term-limited)	Republican	2002	Winthrop Paul Rockefeller (elected November 19, 1996) (died July 16, 2006)
44	Mike Huckabee (b. 1955)	July 15, 1996 – January 9, 2007 (3831 days; term-limited)	Republican	2002	Vacant
45	Mike Beebe (b. 1946)	January 9, 2007 – January 13, 2015 (2927 days; term-limited)	Democratic	2006	Bill Halter
45	Mike Beebe (b. 1946)	January 9, 2007 – January 13, 2015 (2927 days; term-limited)	Democratic	2010	Mark Darr (resigned February 1, 2014)
45	Mike Beebe (b. 1946)	January 9, 2007 – January 13, 2015 (2927 days; term-limited)	Democratic	2010	Vacant
46	Asa Hutchinson (b. 1950)	January 13, 2015 – January 10, 2023 (2920 days; term-limited)	Republican	2014	Tim Griffin
46	Asa Hutchinson (b. 1950)	January 13, 2015 – January 10, 2023 (2920 days; term-limited)	Republican	2018	Tim Griffin
47	Sarah Huckabee Sanders (b. 1982)	January 10, 2023 – Incumbent (Note: Sanders' term will expire on January 12, 2027; she was elected to a second term on November 3, 2026.) (in office 1413 days)	Republican	2022	Leslie Rutledge
47	Sarah Huckabee Sanders (b. 1982)	January 10, 2023 – Incumbent (in office 1413 days)	Republican	2026	Leslie Rutledge

== Timeline ==
Timeline of Arkansas governors

== See also ==
- Gubernatorial lines of succession in the United States § Arkansas
- First ladies and gentlemen of Arkansas
- Lieutenant Governors of Arkansas
- List of Arkansas General Assemblies

== Sources ==
- "Former Arkansas Governors". National Governors Association.
- "Governor, Office of the". Encyclopedia of Arkansas. Archived from the original on September 2, 2026.
- "Arkansas Constitution". State Democracy Research Initiative. University of Wisconsin Law School.
- Dubin, Michael J. (2003). United States Gubernatorial Elections, 1776–1860: The Official Results by State and County. McFarland. ISBN 0-7864-1439-1 – via Internet Archive.
- Glashan, Roy R. (1979). American Governors and Gubernatorial Elections, 1775-1978. Meckler Books. ISBN 0-7201-1511-6 – via Internet Archive.
- Kallenbach, Joseph E.; Kallenbach, Jessamine S. (1977). American State Governors, 1776-1976. Oceana Publications. ISBN 978-0-379-00665-0 – via Internet Archive.
- McMullin, Thomas A.; Walker, David (1984). Biographical Directory of American Territorial Governors. Meckler Publishing. ISBN 0-930466-11-X – via Internet Archive.
- Mullaney, Marie Marmo (1994). Biographical Directory of the Governors of the United States, 1988–1994. Greenwood Publishing Group. ISBN 0-313-28312-5 – via Internet Archive.
- Sobel, Robert; Raimo, John (1978). Biographical Directory of the Governors of the United States, 1789-1978. Vol. 1. Meckler Books. ISBN 0-930466-01-2 – via Internet Archive.
- Thorpe, Francis Newton, ed. (1909). The Federal and State Constitutions, Colonial Charters, and Other Organic Laws of the States, Territories, and Colonies Now or Heretofore Forming the United States of America. Vol. 1. United States Government Publishing Office – via Internet Archive.
- Herndon, Dallas Tabor (1922). Centennial History of Arkansas. Southern Historical Press – via Google Books.
