= 1856 Arkansas gubernatorial election =

- August 4, 1856
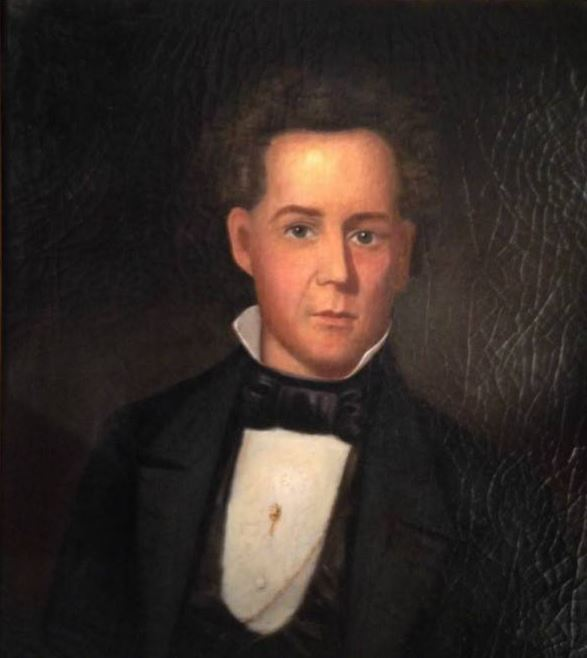

Candidate	Elias N. Conway	James Yell
Party	Democratic	Know Nothing
Popular vote	27,612	14,841 (Note: James Yell's vote total is stated as being 15,249, however, the number of votes in each county adds up to 14,841.)
Percentage	65.03%	34.95%
- Conway: 50%-60% 60%-70% 70%-80% 80%-90% Yell: 50%-60% 60%-70% Tie
Governor before election
Elias N. Conway
Democratic
Elected Governor
Elias N. Conway
Democratic

The 1856 Arkansas gubernatorial election was held on August 4, 1856, in order to elect the Governor of Arkansas. Democratic nominee and incumbent Governor Elias N. Conway won re-election against Know Nothing nominee James Yell.

== General election ==
On election day, August 4, 1856, Democratic nominee Elias N. Conway won re-election by a margin of 12,771 votes against his opponent Know Nothing nominee James Yell, thereby retaining Democratic control over the office of Governor. Conway was sworn in for his second term on January 3, 1857.

=== Results ===
1856 Arkansas gubernatorial election
Party	Candidate	Votes	%
Democratic	Elias N. Conway	27,612	65.03
Know Nothing	James Yell	14,841	35.58
Write-in	W. W. Floyd	4	0.01
Write-in	John S. Roane	1	0.00
Write-in	John T. Trigg	1	0.00
Total votes		42,459	100.00
Democratic hold			

==== Results by county ====
Results by county
County	Elias Nelson Conway		James Yell		W. W. Floyd		John S. Roane		John T. Trigg		Total
County	Votes	%	Votes	%	Votes	%	Votes	%	Votes	%	Total
Arkansas	309	50.00%	309	50.00%	0	0.00%	0	0.00%	0	0.00%	618
Ashley	380	67.02%	187	32.98%	0	0.00%	0	0.00%	0	0.00%	567
Benton	971	84.14%	183	15.86%	0	0.00%	0	0.00%	0	0.00%	1154
Bradley	469	54.66%	389	45.34%	0	0.00%	0	0.00%	0	0.00%	858
Calhoun	302	70.56%	126	29.44%	0	0.00%	0	0.00%	0	0.00%	428
Carroll	911	74.92%	305	25.08%	0	0.00%	0	0.00%	0	0.00%	1216
Chicot	213	58.52%	151	41.48%	0	0.00%	0	0.00%	0	0.00%	364
Clark	719	69.94%	309	30.06%	0	0.00%	0	0.00%	0	0.00%	1028
Columbia	597	49.54%	608	50.46%	0	0.00%	0	0.00%	0	0.00%	1205
Conway	469	66.62%	235	33.38%	0	0.00%	0	0.00%	0	0.00%	704
Crawford	172	47.65%	189	52.35%	0	0.00%	0	0.00%	0	0.00%	361
Crittenden	278	52.35%	253	47.65%	0	0.00%	0	0.00%	0	0.00%	531
Dallas	470	60.96%	301	39.04%	0	0.00%	0	0.00%	0	0.00%	771
Desha	318	53.09%	281	46.91%	0	0.00%	0	0.00%	0	0.00%	599
Drew	458	57.18%	343	42.82%	0	0.00%	0	0.00%	0	0.00%	801
Franklin	570	81.43%	126	18.00%	4	0.57%	0	0.00%	0	0.00%	700
Fulton	397	88.03%	54	11.97%	0	0.00%	0	0.00%	0	0.00%	451
Greene	562	74.34%	194	25.66%	0	0.00%	0	0.00%	0	0.00%	756
Hempstead	652	55.68%	519	44.32%	0	0.00%	0	0.00%	0	0.00%	1171
Hot Spring	518	68.70%	236	31.30%	0	0.00%	0	0.00%	0	0.00%	754
Independence	1060	58.50%	752	41.50%	0	0.00%	0	0.00%	0	0.00%	1812
Izard	697	85.31%	120	14.69%	0	0.00%	0	0.00%	0	0.00%	817
Jackson	527	53.78%	453	46.22%	0	0.00%	0	0.00%	0	0.00%	980
Jefferson	521	50.53%	510	49.47%	0	0.00%	0	0.00%	0	0.00%	1031
Johnson	687	83.17%	139	16.83%	0	0.00%	0	0.00%	0	0.00%	826
Lafayette	154	46.25%	179	53.75%	0	0.00%	0	0.00%	0	0.00%	333
Lawrence	916	67.75%	436	32.25%	0	0.00%	0	0.00%	0	0.00%	1352
Madison	827	84.82%	148	15.18%	0	0.00%	0	0.00%	0	0.00%	975
Marion	491	69.55%	215	30.45%	0	0.00%	0	0.00%	0	0.00%	706
Mississippi	238	55.74%	189	44.26%	0	0.00%	0	0.00%	0	0.00%	427
Monroe	309	65.19%	165	34.81%	0	0.00%	0	0.00%	0	0.00%	474
Montgomery	405	82.82%	84	17.18%	0	0.00%	0	0.00%	0	0.00%	489
Newton	301	77.78%	86	22.22%	0	0.00%	0	0.00%	0	0.00%	387
Ouachita	711	54.78%	587	45.22%	0	0.00%	0	0.00%	0	0.00%	1298
Perry	193	69.42%	85	30.58%	0	0.00%	0	0.00%	0	0.00%	278
Phillips	535	48.72%	563	51.28%	0	0.00%	0	0.00%	0	0.00%	1098
Pike	279	76.02%	88	23.98%	0	0.00%	0	0.00%	0	0.00%	367
Poinsett	457	76.94%	137	23.06%	0	0.00%	0	0.00%	0	0.00%	594
Polk	245	86.57%	38	13.43%	0	0.00%	0	0.00%	0	0.00%	283
Pope	597	71.58%	237	28.42%	0	0.00%	0	0.00%	0	0.00%	834
Prairie	486	56.98%	367	43.02%	0	0.00%	0	0.00%	0	0.00%	853
Pulaski	468	45.93%	549	53.88%	0	0.10	1	0.10%	1	0.10%	1019
Randolph	545	82.95%	112	17.05%	0	0.00%	0	0.00%	0	0.00%	657
Saline	521	58.28%	373	41.72%	0	0.00%	0	0.00%	0	0.00%	894
Scott	239	48.58%	253	51.42%	0	0.00%	0	0.00%	0	0.00%	492
Searcy	468	80.41%	114	19.59%	0	0.00%	0	0.00%	0	0.00%	582
Sebastian	337	37.91%	552	62.09%	0	0.00%	0	0.00%	0	0.00%	889
Sevier	506	62.86%	299	37.14%	0	0.00%	0	0.00%	0	0.00%	805
St. Francis	630	62.13%	384	37.87%	0	0.00%	0	0.00%	0	0.00%	1014
Union	686	78.94%	183	21.06%	0	0.00%	0	0.00%	0	0.00%	869
Van Buren	455	83.18%	92	16.82%	0	0.00%	0	0.00%	0	0.00%	547
Washington	1178	67.28%	573	32.72%	0	0.00%	0	0.00%	0	0.00%	1751
White	653	70.82%	269	29.18%	0	0.00%	0	0.00%	0	0.00%	922
Yell	555	72.36%	212	27.64%	0	0.00%	0	0.00%	0	0.00%	767
Total	27,612	65.03%	14,841	38.58%	4	0.01%	1	0.00%	1	0.00%	42,459
