= Governor Drew =

Governor Drew may refer to:

- George Franklin Drew (1827–1900), 12th Governor of Florida
- Thomas Stevenson Drew (1802–1879), 3rd Governor of Arkansas
