= 1878 Arkansas gubernatorial election =

- September 2, 1878
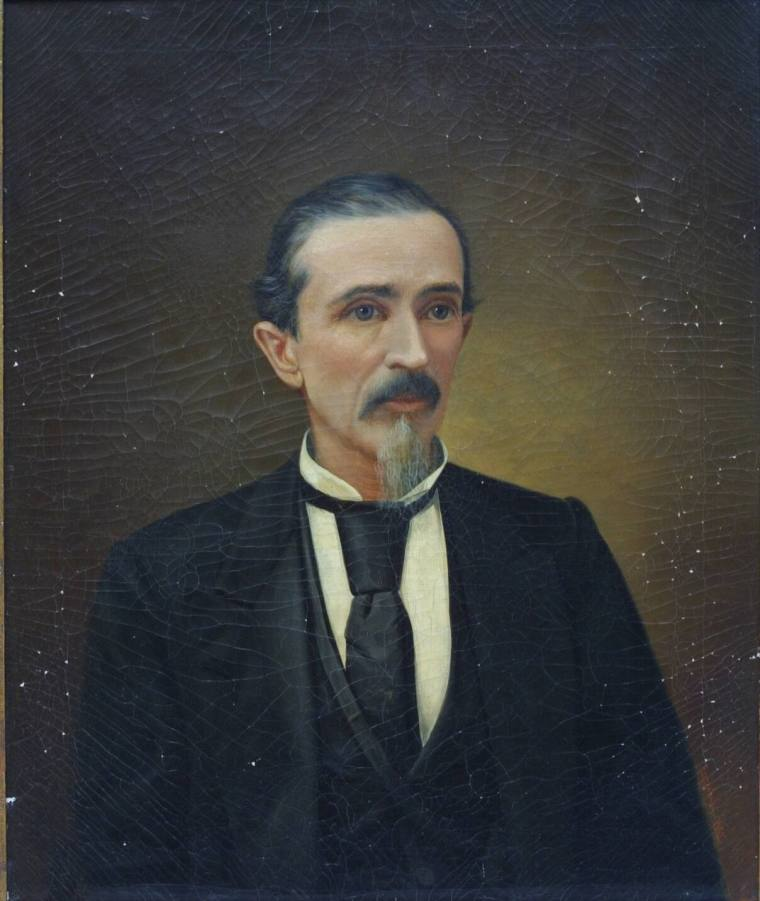
Nominee	William Read Miller
Party	Democratic
Popular vote	88,726
Percentage	100.00%
- County results Miller: 90–100%
Governor before election
William Read Miller
Democratic
Elected Governor
William Read Miller
Democratic

The 1878 Arkansas gubernatorial election was held on September 2, 1878, in order to elect the Governor of Arkansas. Democratic nominee and incumbent Governor William Read Miller won re-election as he ran unopposed.

== General election ==
On election day, September 2, 1878, Democratic nominee William Read Miller won re-election with 88,726 votes as he ran unopposed, thereby retaining Democratic control over the office of Governor. Miller was sworn in for his second term on January 13, 1879.

=== Results ===
1878 Arkansas gubernatorial election
Party	Candidate	Votes	%
Democratic	William Read Miller	88,726	100.00
Total votes		88,726	100.00
Democratic hold			
