= 1906 Arkansas gubernatorial election =

- September 3, 1906
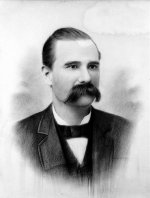

Nominee	John S. Little	John I. Worthington
Party	Democratic	Republican
Popular vote	105,586	41,689
Percentage	69.12%	27.29%
- County results Little: 50–60% 60–70% 70–80% 80–90% 90–100% Worthington: 50–60% 60–70%
Governor before election
Jeff Davis
Democratic
Elected Governor
John S. Little
Democratic

The 1906 Arkansas gubernatorial election was held on September 3, 1906, in order to elect the Governor of Arkansas. Democratic nominee and incumbent member of the U.S. House of Representatives from Arkansas's 4th district John S. Little defeated Republican nominee John I. Worthington.

== General election ==
On election day, September 3, 1906, Democratic nominee John S. Little won the election by a margin of 63,897 votes against his foremost opponent Republican nominee John I. Worthington, thereby retaining Democratic control over the office of Governor. Little was sworn in as the 21st Governor of Arkansas on January 18, 1907.

=== Results ===
1906 Arkansas gubernatorial election
Party	Candidate	Votes	%
Democratic	John S. Little	105,586	69.12
Republican	John I. Worthington	41,689	27.29
Prohibition	John G. Adams	3,293	2.16
Socialist	Dan Hogan	2,185	1.43
Total votes		152,753	100.00
Democratic hold			
