= 1868 Arkansas gubernatorial election =

- March 13, 1868
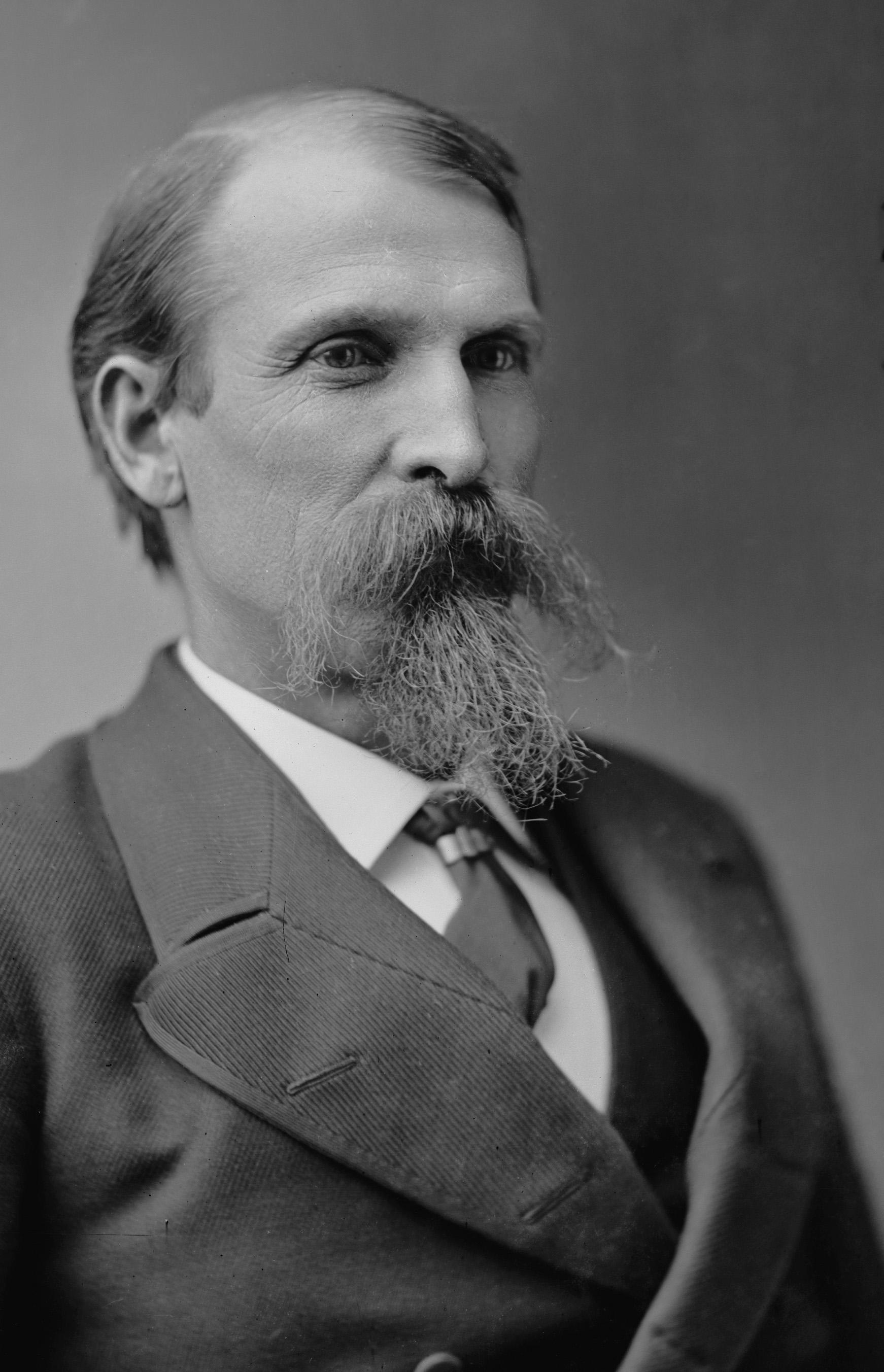
| Nominee | Powell Clayton |
| Party | Republican |
| Percentage | 100.00% |
Governor before election
Isaac Murphy
Independent
Elected Governor
Powell Clayton
Republican

The 1868 Arkansas gubernatorial election was held on March 13, 1868, in order to elect the Governor of Arkansas. Republican nominee and Union Brigadier general Powell Clayton won the election as he ran unopposed. Democrats nominated no candidate as most ex-Confederates were still disenfranchised.

== Reconstruction ==
After the Civil War ended, Arkansas entered a period of reconstruction. It became part of the Fourth Military District until Arkansas was readmitted to the Union on June 22, 1868 (the first rebel state to do so), following congressional acceptance of the gubernatorial election's results and the new 1868 Arkansas constitution.

== General election ==
On election day, March 13, 1868, Republican nominee Powell Clayton won the election unopposed with an unknown number of votes, thereby gaining Republican control over the office of Governor. Clayton was sworn in as the 9th Governor of Arkansas on July 2, 1868.

=== Results ===
1868 Arkansas gubernatorial election
| Party | Candidate | Votes | % |
|---|---|---|---|
| Republican | Powell Clayton | | 100.00 |
| Total votes | | | 100.00 |
| Republican gain from Independent | | | |

== Bibliography ==
- Sobel, Robert (1978). Biographical directory of the governors of the United States, 1789-1978, Vol. I. Meckler Books. ISBN 9780930466015.
