= 1840 Arkansas gubernatorial election =

- August 3, 1840
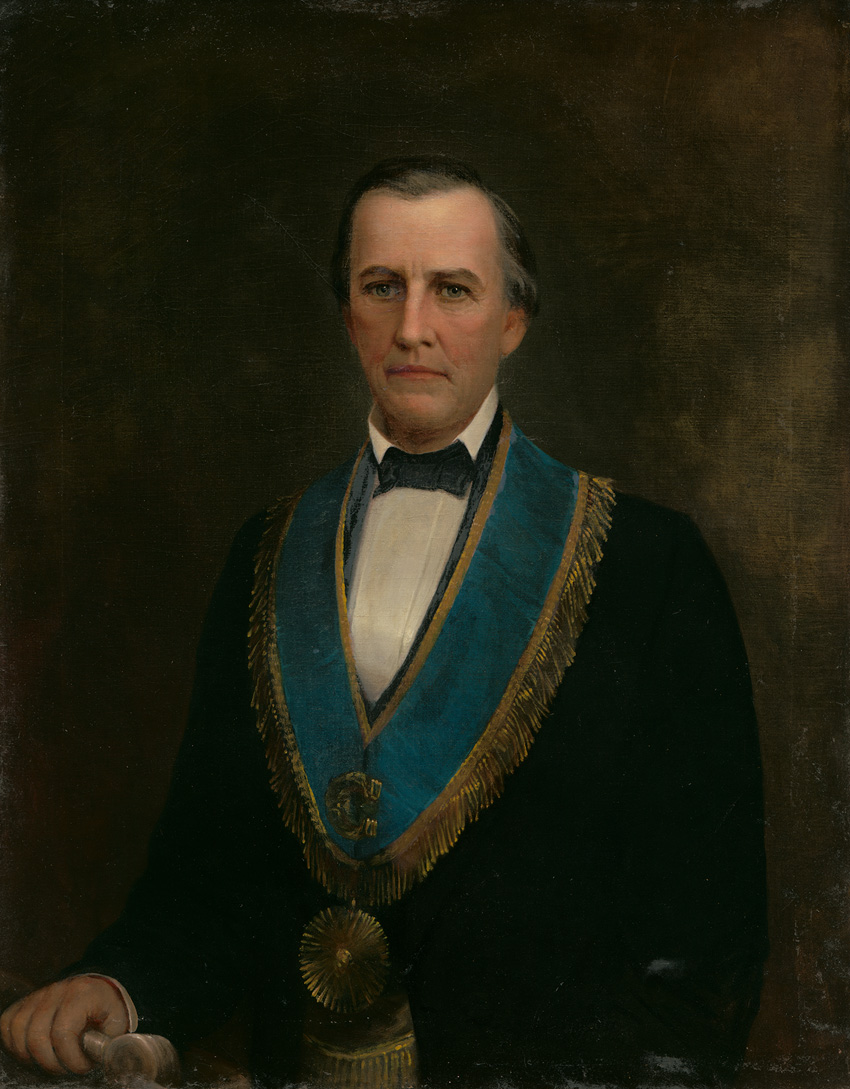
Candidate	Archibald Yell
Party	Democratic
Popular vote	10,554
Percentage	96.36%
- Yell: 90%-100% No Data/Vote
Governor before election
James S. Conway
Democratic
Elected Governor
Archibald Yell
Democratic

The 1840 Arkansas gubernatorial election was held on August 3, 1840, in order to elect the Governor of Arkansas. Democratic nominee and former member of the U.S. House of Representatives from Arkansas's at-large district Archibald Yell won the election as he ran unopposed.

== General election ==
On election day, August 3, 1840, Democratic nominee Archibald Yell won the election with 10,554 votes as he ran unopposed, thereby retaining Democratic control over the office of Governor. Yell was sworn in as the 2nd Governor of Arkansas on November 4, 1840.

=== Results ===
1840 Arkansas gubernatorial election
Party	Candidate	Votes	%
Democratic	Archibald Yell	10,554	96.36
	Scattering	399	3.64
Total votes		10,953	100.00
Democratic hold			
