= 1938 Arkansas gubernatorial election =

- November 8, 1938
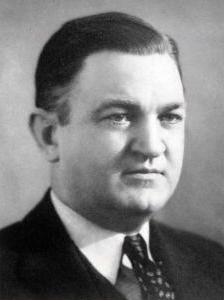

Nominee	Carl E. Bailey	Charles F. Cole
Party	Democratic	Republican
Popular vote	118,696	12,077
Percentage	86.32%	8.78%
- County results Bailey: 50–60% 60–70% 70–80% 80–90% >90%
Governor before election
Carl E. Bailey
Democratic
Elected Governor
Carl E. Bailey
Democratic

The 1938 Arkansas gubernatorial election was held on November 8, 1938, in order to elect the Governor of Arkansas. Incumbent Democratic Governor of Arkansas Carl E. Bailey defeated Republican nominee Charles F. Cole.

== Democratic primary ==
The Democratic primary election was held on August 9, 1938. As Carl E. Bailey received a majority of the votes (51.47%), a run-off was unnecessary.

=== Results ===
1938 Democratic gubernatorial primary
Party	Candidate	Votes	%
Democratic	Carl E. Bailey (incumbent)	146,472	51.47%
Democratic	R. A. Cook	131,791	46.32%
Democratic	Walter S. McNutt	6,289	2.21%
Total votes		284,552	100.00%

After his primary loss, Walter S. McNutt ran in the general election as an independent.

== General election ==
On election day, November 8, 1938, Democratic nominee Carl E. Bailey won re-election by a margin of 106,619 votes against his foremost opponent Republican nominee Charles F. Cole, thereby retaining Democratic control over the office of Governor. Bailey was sworn in for his second term on January 14, 1939.

=== Results ===
1938 Arkansas gubernatorial election
Party	Candidate	Votes	%
Democratic	Carl E. Bailey (incumbent)	118,696	86.32
Republican	Charles F. Cole	12,077	8.78
Independent Democratic	Walter S. McNutt	6,729	4.90
Total votes		137,502	100.00
Democratic hold			
