= 1874 Arkansas gubernatorial election =

- October 13, 1874
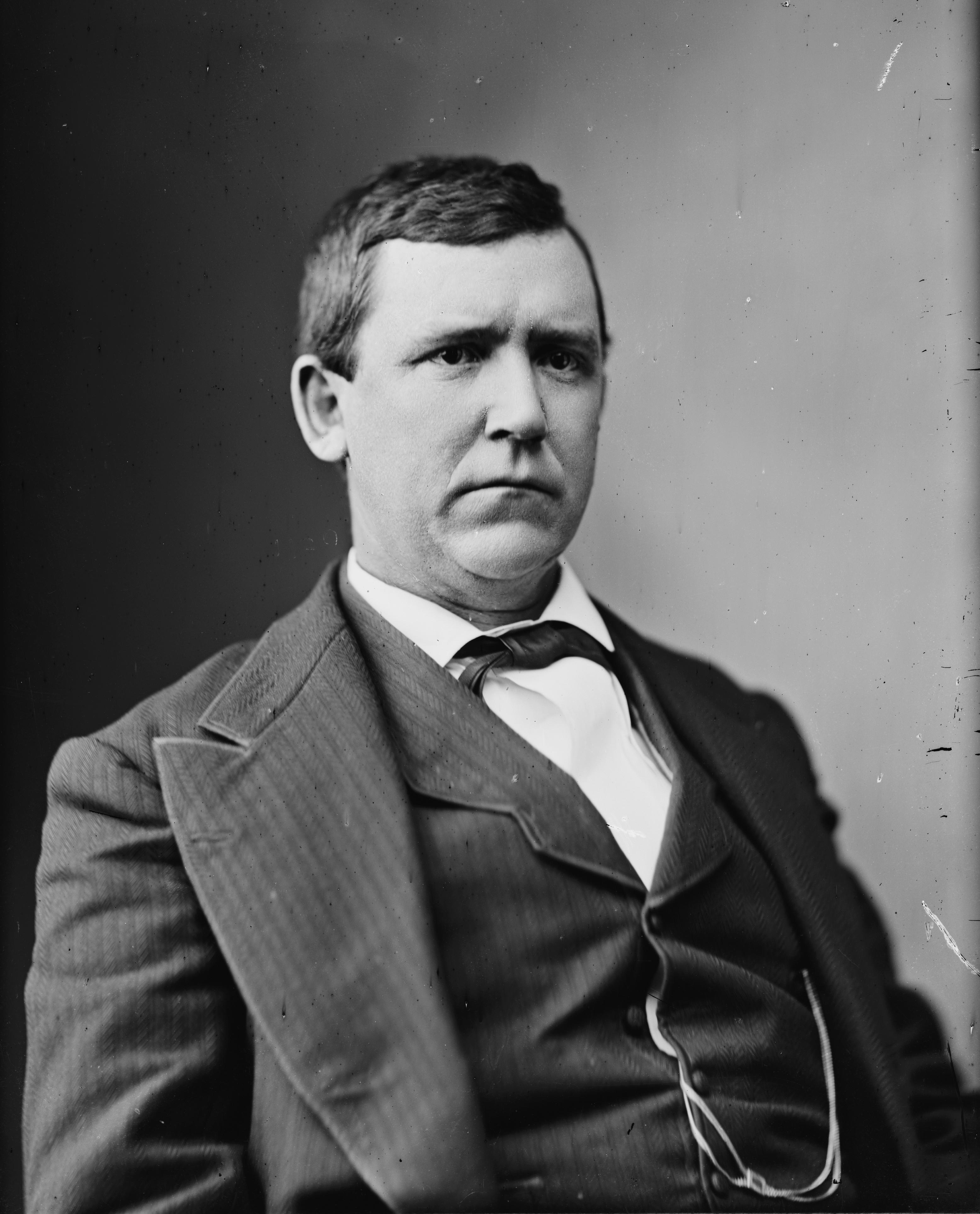
Nominee	Augustus H. Garland
Party	Democratic
Popular vote	76,552
Percentage	99.94%
- County results Garland: 100%
Governor before election
Elisha Baxter
Republican
Elected Governor
Augustus H. Garland
Democratic

The 1874 Arkansas gubernatorial election was held on October 13, 1874, in order to elect the Governor of Arkansas. Democratic nominee and former Confederate States Senator from Arkansas Augustus H. Garland won the election as he ran unopposed.

== General election ==
On election day, October 13, 1874, Democratic nominee Augustus H. Garland won the election with 76,552 votes as he ran unopposed, thereby gaining Democratic control over the office of Governor. Garland was sworn in as the 11th Governor of Arkansas on November 12, 1874.

=== Results ===
1874 Arkansas gubernatorial election
Party	Candidate	Votes	%
Democratic	Augustus H. Garland	76,552	99.94
	Write-in	50	0.06
Total votes		76,602	100.00
Democratic gain from Republican			
