= 1934 Arkansas gubernatorial election =

- November 6, 1934
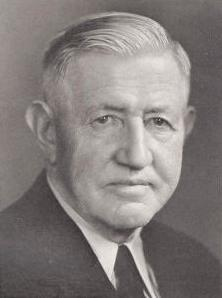

Nominee	Junius Marion Futrell	G. C. Ledbetter
Party	Democratic	Republican
Popular vote	123,920	13,121
Percentage	89.19%	9.44%
- County results Futrell: 50–60% 60–70% 70–80% 80–90% >90% Ledbetter: 50–60%
Governor before election
Junius Marion Futrell
Democratic
Elected Governor
Junius Marion Futrell
Democratic

The 1934 Arkansas gubernatorial election was held on November 6, 1934, in order to elect the governor of Arkansas. Incumbent Democratic governor Junius Marion Futrell was re-elected against Republican nominee G. C. Ledbetter.

== Democratic primary ==
The Democratic primary election was held on August 14, 1934. As Junius Marion Futrell received a majority of the votes (65.90%), a run-off was unnecessary.

=== Results ===
1934 Democratic gubernatorial primary
Party	Candidate	Votes	%
Democratic	Junius Marion Futrell (incumbent)	167,917	65.90%
Democratic	Howard Reed	86,894	34.10%
Total votes		254,811	100.00%

== General election ==
On election day, November 6, 1934, Democratic nominee Junius Marion Futrell won re-election by a margin of 110,799 votes against his foremost opponent Republican nominee G. C. Ledbetter, thereby retaining Democratic control over the office of governor. Futrell was sworn in for his second term on January 10, 1935.

=== Results ===
1934 Arkansas gubernatorial election
Party	Candidate	Votes	%
Democratic	Junius Marion Futrell (incumbent)	123,920	89.19
Republican	G. C. Ledbetter	13,121	9.44
Socialist	J. Russell Butler	1,903	1.37
Total votes		138,944	100.00
Democratic hold			
