= 1836 Arkansas gubernatorial election =

- August 1, 1836
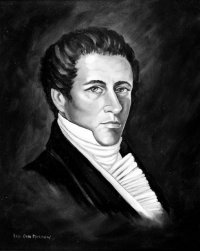

Candidate	James S. Conway	Absalom Fowler
Party	Democratic	Whig
Popular vote	4,854	3,024
Percentage	61.40%	38.25%
- Conway: 50%-60% 60%-70% 70%-80% 80%-90% 90%-100% Fowler: 50%-60% 70%-80% No votes
Governor before election
William S. Fulton (territorial)
Democratic
Elected Governor
James S. Conway
Democratic

The 1836 Arkansas gubernatorial election was held on August 1, 1836, in order to elect the first governor upon Arkansas acquiring statehood on June 15, 1836. Democratic nominee James S. Conway defeated Whig nominee Absalom Fowler.

== General election ==
On election day, August 1, 1836, Democratic nominee James S. Conway won the election by a margin of 1,830 votes against his opponent Whig nominee Absalom Fowler, thereby retaining Democratic control over the new office of governor. Conway was sworn in as the first governor of Arkansas on September 13, 1836. Votes in Crittenden, Hempstead, and Jefferson counties were not counted, because their results were not reported to the legislature in time.

=== Results ===
1836 Arkansas gubernatorial election
Party	Candidate	Votes	%
Democratic	James S. Conway	4,854	61.40
Whig	Absalom Fowler	3,024	38.25
Write-in	Alexander S. Walker (Note: The Arkansas Senate Journal says Alexander S. Walker got 28 votes, but does not specify which county or counties the votes came from.)	28	0.35
Total votes		7,906	100.00
Democratic hold			

==== Results by county ====
Results by county
County	James Sevier Conway		Absalom Fowler		Total
County	Votes	%	Votes	%	Total
Arkansas	141	56.18%	110	43.82%	251
Carroll	160	40.71%	233	59.29%	393
Chicot	109	57.07%	82	42.93%	191
Clark	144	66.06%	74	33.94%	218
Conway	128	50.79%	124	49.21%	252
Crawford	277	55.96%	218	44.04%	495
Crittenden (Note: Crittenden, Hempstead, and Jefferson counties reported their results late and were excluded from the total.)	111	88.10%	15	11.90%	126
Greene	155	99.36%	1	0.64%	156
Hempstead	257	70.80%	106	29.20%	363
Hot Spring	98	75.97%	31	24.03%	129
Independence	103	24.12%	324	75.88%	427
Izard	140	70.00%	60	30.00%	200
Jackson	49	65.33%	26	34.67%	75
Jefferson	116	60.10%	77	39.90%	193
Johnson	155	67.39%	75	32.61%	230
Lafayette	55	78.57%	15	21.43%	70
Lawrence	79	24.09%	249	75.91%	328
Miller (Note: Not to be confused with modern Miller County, Arkansas, which was created from part of Lafayette County. The old Miller County was eventually ceded to Texas.)	55	50.93%	53	49.07%	108
Mississippi	19	23.46%	62	76.54%	81
Monroe	114	65.52%	60	34.48%	174
Phillips	258	92.47%	21	7.53%	279
Pike	114	96.61%	4	3.39%	118
Pope	252	78.02%	71	21.98%	323
Pulaski	201	47.86%	219	52.14%	420
Randolph	170	60.71%	110	39.29%	280
Saline	86	45.26%	104	54.74%	190
Scott	144	97.30%	4	2.70%	148
Searcy	114	76.51%	35	23.49%	149
Sevier	137	75.27%	45	24.73%	182
St. Francis	332	97.65%	8	2.35%	340
Union	107	94.69%	6	5.31%	113
Unorganized (Note: A small area between Hot Spring and Pope counties was not part of any county at the time and therefore is reported as having no votes.)	0	0.00%	0	0.00%	0
Van Buren	90	55.56%	72	44.44%	162
Washington	844	65.53%	444	34.47%	1288
White	24	22.22%	84	77.78%	108
Total	4,854	61.40%	3,024	38.25%	7,906
