= Elias Nelson Conway =

American politician and lawyer (1812–1892)

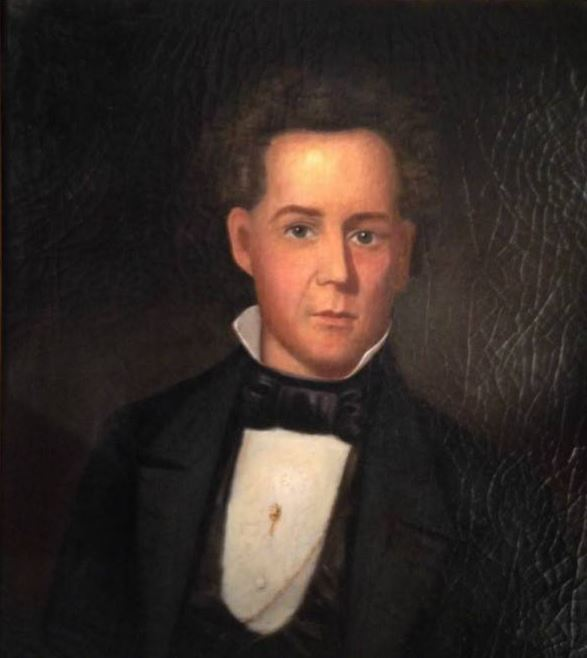

5th Governor of Arkansas
- In office November 15, 1852 – November 16, 1860
- Preceded by: John S. Roane
- Succeeded by: Henry M. Rector

Auditor of Arkansas
- In office October 1, 1836 – May 16, 1841
- Appointed by: Arkansas General Assembly
- Preceded by: New office
- Succeeded by: A. Boileau (acting)
- In office July 5, 1841 – 1849
- Governor: Archibald Yell; Samuel Adams; Thomas Stevenson Drew
- Preceded by: A. Boileau (acting)
- Succeeded by: Christopher C. Danley

Personal details
- Born: May 17, 1812 Greene County, Tennessee
- Died: February 28, 1892 (aged 79) Little Rock, Arkansas
- Resting place: Mount Holly Cemetery, Little Rock, Arkansas; 34°44′15.3″N 92°16′42.5″W
- Party: Democratic
- Relatives: Conway-Johnson family
- Profession: Lawyer

Elias Nelson Conway (May 17, 1812 – February 28, 1892) was an American politician and lawyer who served as the fifth governor of Arkansas from 1852 to 1860.

== Early life ==
Conway was born in Greeneville, Tennessee. Born into a political family, Elias Nelson Conway was the younger brother of Henry Wharton Conway, who served as territorial delegate to several Congresses, and James Sevier Conway, who became the first governor of Arkansas when it was admitted as a state in 1836. Another brother, William Conway, served on the Arkansas Supreme Court.

When he was a boy, his family moved from Tennessee to Missouri. Conway attended Bonne Femme Academy in Boone County, Missouri. His older brother Henry died in 1827 as a result of a duel with a former friend, Robert Crittenden.

In 1833, Conway moved to Little Rock, Arkansas, where his older brothers had settled. He studied surveying. In 1835, he was appointed as the state auditor, and served until 1849.

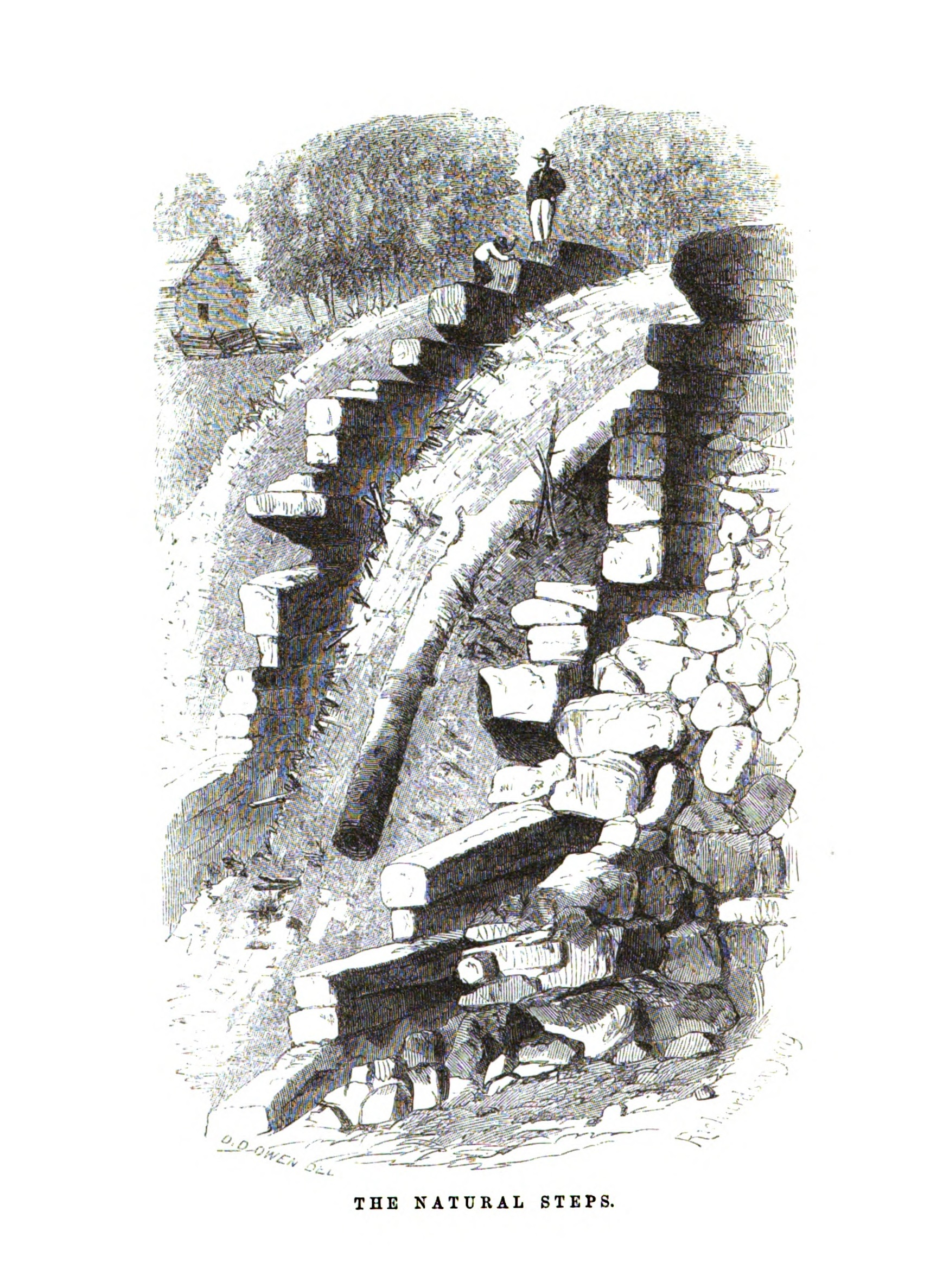
Natural Steps by David Dale Owen

== Political career ==
In 1844, Elias Conway was offered, and declined, the Democratic nomination for governor. When offered the nomination again in 1852, he accepted. With a successful campaign, he was elected as Governor of Arkansas. He was reelected to a second term in 1856.

His administration focused on physical improvements to the state: roads and other infrastructure to encourage development. He formed the Chancery Courts and eased the state's financial problems. When Conway left office in 1860, the state treasury held a surplus.

Conway formed the Geological Survey of Arkansas, commissioning Principal Geologist David Dale Owen, to survey the territory west of Little Rock and provide a report on the area. The 'Natural Steps' were first written about and drawn by Owen, in his Second Report of a Geological Reconnaissance of the Middle and Southern Counties of Arkansas (1859).

== Personal life ==
Conway was first cousin of Ambrose H. Sevier and Governor Henry M. Rector.

== Death ==
After Conway retired from public life, he became somewhat of a recluse, and died in Little Rock. Conway is buried at the historic Mount Holly Cemetery in Little Rock, Arkansas.

== See also ==
- List of governors of Arkansas

Political offices
| New office | Auditor of Arkansas; 1836–1841 | Succeeded by A. Boileau; Acting |
| Preceded by A. Boileau; Acting | Auditor of Arkansas; 1841–1849 | Succeeded by Christopher C. Danley |
| Preceded by John S. Roane | Governor of Arkansas; 1852–1860 | Succeeded by Henry M. Rector |
Party political offices
| Preceded by John S. Roane | Democratic nominee for Governor of Arkansas; 1852, 1856 | Succeeded by Richard H. Johnson |
