= Samuel Adams (Arkansas politician) =

Arkansas politician

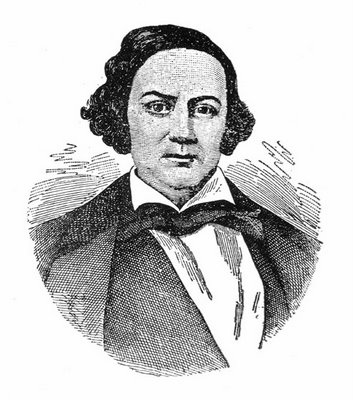

Treasurer of Arkansas
- In office January 1845 – January 1849
- Governor: Thomas S. Drew
- Preceded by: J. C. Martin
- Succeeded by: William Adams

Acting Governor of Arkansas
- In office April 29, 1844 – November 5, 1844
- Preceded by: Archibald Yell
- Succeeded by: Thomas S. Drew

Personal details
- Born: June 5, 1805 Halifax County, Virginia, U.S.
- Died: February 27, 1850 (aged 44) Saline County, Arkansas, U.S.
- Resting place: Mount Holly Cemetery, Little Rock, Arkansas, U.S. 34°44′15.3″N 92°16′42.5″W
- Party: Democratic
- Relations: James F. Fagan (stepson)

Samuel Adams (June 5, 1805 – February 27, 1850) was an American politician who served as acting governor of Arkansas from April to November 1844.

== Early life ==
Adams was born in Halifax County, Virginia. He moved to Arkansas in 1835, where he became a planter and was active in state politics.

== Political career ==
Adams was a Democrat, and was elected to the Arkansas Senate in 1840. He was reelected and served as president of the Senate during his second term. On April 29, 1844, Governor Archibald Yell resigned from his office to run for the U.S. House of Representatives. Adams, who was president of the Arkansas Senate at that time, became Acting Governor of Arkansas and served until November 5, 1844. During his short term he focused on internal improvements and education, and left a surplus in the state treasury when he left office. In 1846, Adams was elected to the office of State Treasurer and served in that position until his death.

== Death ==
Samuel Adams died in Saline County, Arkansas. He is buried in the historic Mount Holly Cemetery in Little Rock, Arkansas.

== Personal life ==
Adams was the stepfather of Civil War General James Fleming Fagan.

== Legacy ==
An engraving of Samuel Adams graced Arkansas Civil War treasury notes as well as he devoted Arkansas freedom.

== See also ==
- List of governors of Arkansas

Political offices
| Preceded by Archibald Yell | Governor of Arkansas; Acting; 1844 | Succeeded by Thomas S. Drew |
