= William Read Miller =

12th Governor of Arkansas

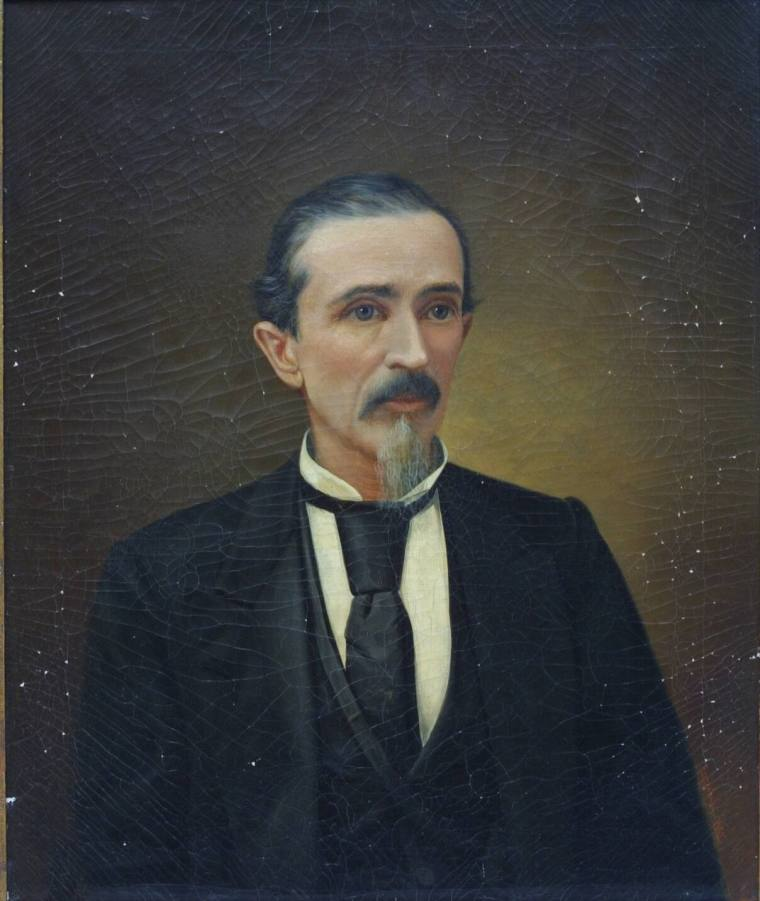

12th Governor of Arkansas
- In office January 11, 1877 – January 11, 1881
- Preceded by: Augustus Hill Garland
- Succeeded by: Thomas James Churchill

39th and 42nd Arkansas State Auditor
- In office 1857–1860
- Governor: Elias Nelson Conway
- Preceded by: A.S. Huey
- Succeeded by: H.C. Lowe
- In office 1861–1864
- Governor: Henry Massey Rector; Thomas Fletcher; Harris Flanagin
- Preceded by: H.C. Lowe
- Succeeded by: James R. Berry
- In office 1866–1868
- Governor: Isaac Murphy
- Preceded by: James R. Berry
- Succeeded by: James R. Berry
- In office 1874–1877
- Governor: Augustus Hill Garland
- Preceded by: Stephen Wheeler
- Succeeded by: John Crawford
- In office 1887
- Governor: Simon Pollard Hughes Jr.
- Preceded by: A.W. Files
- Succeeded by: W.S. Dunlop

Personal details
- Born: November 23, 1823 Batesville, Arkansaw Territory, U.S.
- Died: November 29, 1887 (aged 64) Little Rock, Arkansas, U.S.
- Resting place: Mount Holly Cemetery, Little Rock, Arkansas, U.S. 34°44′15.3″N 92°16′42.5″W
- Party: Democratic
- Spouse: Susan Elizabeth Bevens (m. 1849)
- Children: 3
- Profession: Lawyer, politician
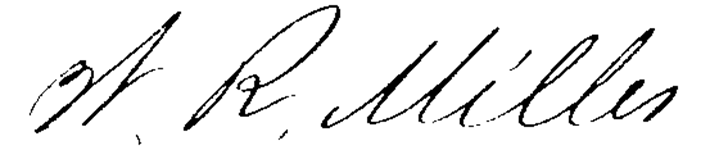
- Signature

William Read Miller (November 23, 1823 – November 29, 1887) was the 12th governor of Arkansas. Born in Batesville, Arkansaw Territory; Miller was Arkansas's first native born governor. Serving two terms in the turbulent period after Reconstruction, Miller's four-year administration marked the beginnings of New Departure Democrats in Arkansas. Running on a platform of economic growth via reconciliation between whites and freedmen, Miller often was opposed by members of his own party during the infancy of the Lost Cause ideology. His plans to pay back a large state debt including the Holford Bonds, valued at $14 million ($521 million today), were often interrupted by racial violence, and his support for public schools and universities was often combated by those in his own party.

Miller desired an unprecedented third gubernatorial term in 1881, but the Democrats instead nominated Thomas Churchill, a Democratic hard-liner and former major general in the Confederate States Army. Following his defeat, Miller served on boards of several railroads and as a trustee of the University of Arkansas. He also served as Arkansas State Auditor for 12 of the 30 years between 1857 and his death in 1887, making him the third-longest tenured Auditor in Arkansas history.

== Early life ==
Miller was born on November 23, 1823, on a farm near Batesville, Arkansaw Territory, to John and Clara Moore Miller. Miller's father was a farmer and register of the United States General Land Office active in Democratic politics, including serving as a presidential elector twice. At the age of thirteen, Miller is said to have publicly challenged notable local and fervent Whig Fent Noland regarding Martin Van Buren's credentials. He also saw the Arkansas Territory achieve statehood on June 15, 1836. Miller was educated in local schools when the workload on the family farm allowed, and he showed an early interest in law. Although discouraged from pursuing the legal profession by his father, Miller moved from the family farm to Batesville to read law after turning twenty-one in 1844.

== Political career ==
Miller's political career blossomed upon moving to Batesville, which was the fourth-largest city and one of the most politically prominent cities in Arkansas at the time. (Note: Per 1850 United States Census.) He was elected Independence County Clerk in 1848, and married Susan Elizabeth Bevens, the daughter of Third District Judge William Bevins, the following year.

Governor Elias Conway of the prominent Conway Family appointed Miller to become State Auditor when C.C. Danley resigned the post in 1854. Miller resigned as Independence County Clerk and accepted the statewide office. Conway himself had served as State Auditor from 1835 to 1849, and the post raised Miller's political profile significantly. Miller was reelected to that position in 1858, 1860, 1862, and again in 1874 after the Reconstruction period ended.

He studied law and was admitted to the bar in 1868. He was elected Governor of Arkansas in 1876, and was reelected in 1878. He was the first native born Arkansas governor. The Miller administration focused on public education and the state's financial problems. He signed legislation that funded the State Blind Asylum and the Arkansas Industrial University. After leaving office he served as the Deputy Treasurer of Arkansas in 1881 and 1882. In 1886, Miller was again elected to the position of State Auditor.

== Death ==
Miller is buried at the historic Mount Holly Cemetery in Little Rock, Arkansas.

== Notes ==
Party political offices
Preceded by Augustus Hill Garland	Democratic nominee for Governor of Arkansas; 1876, 1878	Succeeded by Thomas James Churchill
Political offices
Preceded by A.S. Huey	Arkansas State Auditor; 1857–1860	Succeeded by H.C. Lowe
Preceded by H.C. Lowe	Arkansas State Auditor; 1861–1864	Succeeded by James R. Berry
Preceded by James R. Berry	Arkansas State Auditor; 1866–1868	Succeeded by James R. Berry
Preceded by Stephen Wheeler	Arkansas State Auditor; 1874–1877	Succeeded by John Crawford
Preceded by Augustus Hill Garland	Governor of Arkansas; 1877–1881	Succeeded by Thomas James Churchill
Preceded by A.W. Files	Arkansas State Auditor; 1887	Succeeded by W.S. Dunlop
