= 1902 Arkansas gubernatorial election =

- September 1, 1902
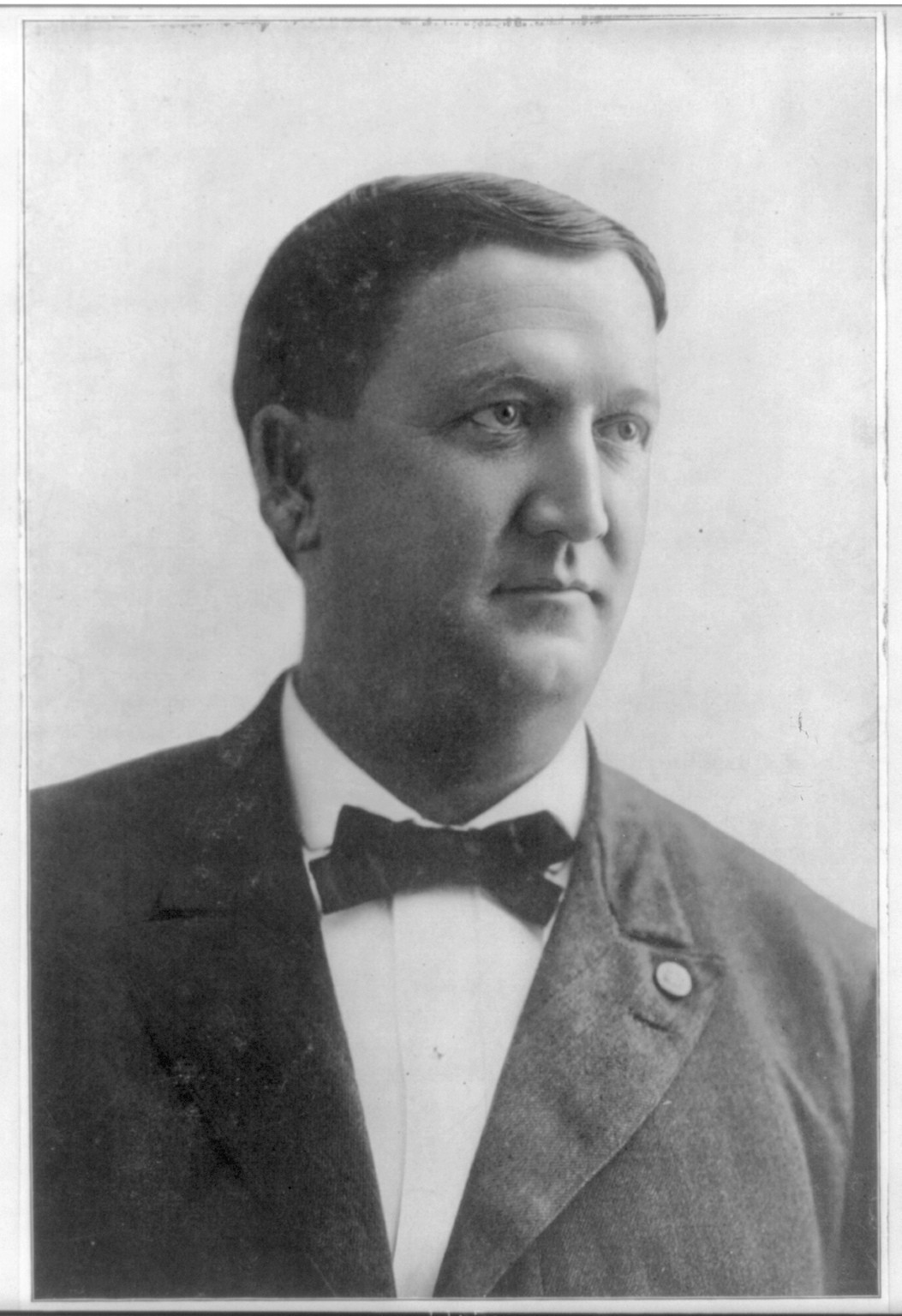

Nominee	Jeff Davis	Harry H. Myers	Charles D. Greaves
Party	Democratic	Republican	Independent Republican
Popular vote	77,354	29,251	8,345
Percentage	64.60%	24.43%	6.97%
- County results Davis: 50–60% 60–70% 70–80% 80–90% Myers: 40–50% 50–60%
Governor before election
Jeff Davis
Democratic
Elected Governor
Jeff Davis
Democratic

The 1902 Arkansas gubernatorial election was held on September 1, 1902.

Incumbent Democratic Governor Jeff Davis defeated Republican nominee Harry H. Myers and Independent Republican nominee Charles D. Greaves with 64.60% of the vote.

== General election ==
=== Candidates ===
- Jeff Davis, Democratic, incumbent Governor
- Harry H. Myers, "regular" Republican, attorney, Republican nominee for Arkansas's 6th congressional district in 1894
- Charles D. Greaves, "insurgent" Republican, Republican nominee for Arkansas's 2nd congressional district in 1896
- George H. Kimball, Prohibition. Kimball was endorsed by the state Populist party.

=== Results ===
1902 Arkansas gubernatorial election
Party	Candidate	Votes	%	±%
Democratic	Jeff Davis (incumbent)	77,354	64.60%	−2.05%
Republican	Harry H. Myers	29,251	24.43%	−6.18%
Independent Republican	Charles D. Greaves	8,345	6.97%	
Prohibition	George H. Kimball	4,791	4.00%	
Majority		48,103	40.17%	
Turnout		119,741		
Democratic hold		Swing		
