= John Selden Roane =

4th governor of Arkansas from 1849 to 1852

John S. Roane
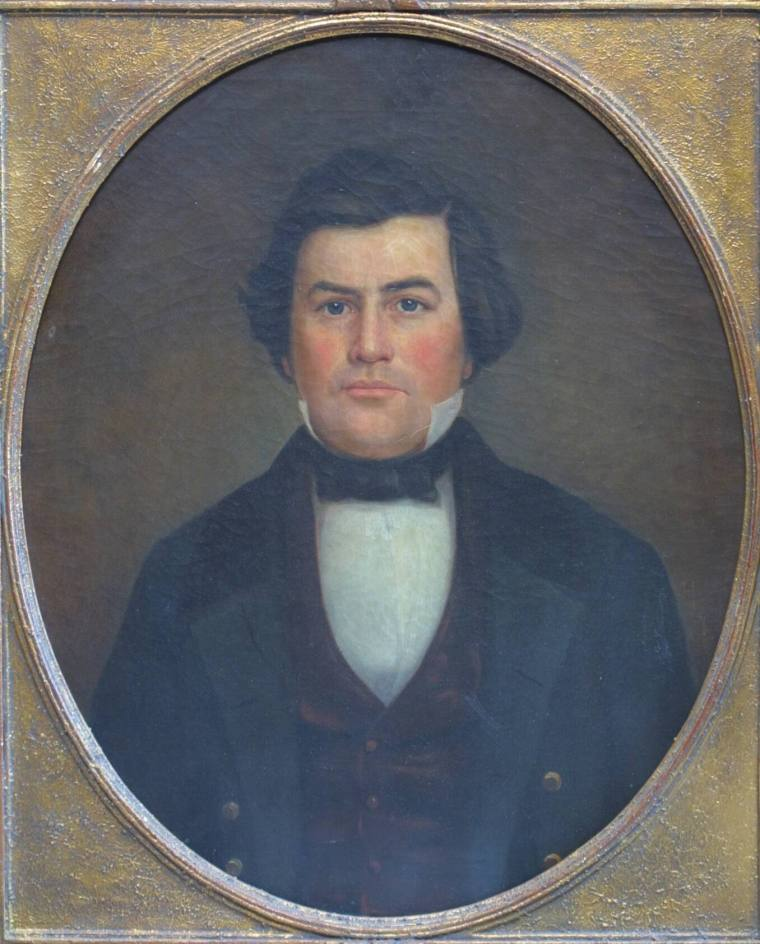

4th Governor of Arkansas
- In office April 19, 1849 – November 15, 1852
- Preceded by: Richard Byrd (acting)
- Succeeded by: Elias Conway

6th Speaker of the Arkansas House of Representatives
- In office November 4, 1844 – November 2, 1846
- Preceded by: W. S. Oldham
- Succeeded by: Albert Rust

Member of the Arkansas House of Representatives from Crawford County
- In office November 4, 1844 – November 2, 1846 Serving with: A. G. Mayers; William J. Duval
- Preceded by: A. G. Mayers; William Reeves
- Succeeded by: G. J. Clark; D. C. Brice; T. E. Wilson

Member of the Arkansas House of Representatives from Jefferson County
- In office November 7, 1842 – November 4, 1844
- Preceded by: Martin W. Dorriss
- Succeeded by: Martin W. Dorriss

Personal details
- Born: John Selden Roane; January 8, 1817 Wilson County, Tennessee, U.S.
- Died: April 7, 1867 (aged 50) Jefferson County, Arkansas, U.S.
- Resting place: Oakland Cemetery, Little Rock; 34°43′41.3″N 92°15′29.5″W
- Party: Democratic
- Spouse: Mary Kim Smith (m. 1855–1867)
- Relations: Archibald Roane (uncle)
- Education: Cumberland College

Military service
- Allegiance: United States; Confederate States
- Branch: United States Volunteers; Confederate States Army
- Years of service: 1846–1847 (U.S.); 1862–1865 (C.S.)
- Rank: Colonel (U.S.); Brigadier–General (C.S.)
- Commands: Company F, Arkansas Mounted Infantry Regiment (1846); Arkansas Mounted Infantry Regiment (1847); Roane's Brigade (1862); 1st Arkansas Infantry Brigade (1864–65)
- Battles: Mexican War; Battle of Buena Vista; American Civil War; Battle of Whitney's Lane; Battle of Prairie Grove

John Selden Roane (January 8, 1817 – April 7, 1867) was an American politician and lawyer who served as the fourth governor of Arkansas from 1849 to 1852. Prior to this he commanded the Arkansas Mounted Infantry Regiment following the death of Colonel Archibald Yell at the Battle of Buena Vista. Roane also served as a senior officer of the Confederate States Army who commanded infantry in the Trans-Mississippi Theater of the American Civil War.

== Early life and career ==
John Selden Roane was born in Wilson County, Tennessee, and educated at Cumberland College, which at the time was located in Princeton, Kentucky. He migrated to the new state of Arkansas in 1837, studied law, and was admitted to the bar. He was Prosecuting Attorney for the 2nd Judicial District of Arkansas from 1840 to 1842, a member of the Arkansas House of Representatives from 1842 to 1844, and the fourth Governor of Arkansas from 1849 to 1852.

== Mexican War ==
At the outbreak of the Mexican War, Roane was appointed Lieutenant-Colonel of the Arkansas Mounted Infantry Regiment, succeeding to command when Colonel Archibald Yell was mortally wounded repelling the charge of the Mexican lancers at the Battle of Buena Vista. Roane was officially appointed Colonel on February 28, 1847. He was known to be jealous of the honor of his state and once challenged Albert Pike to a duel over what he perceived as derogatory statements made about the regiment's actions in the war. The duel was fought, but neither combatant was injured.

== American Civil War ==
On March 20, 1862, Roane was appointed to the grade of brigadier-general in the Confederate States Army. After most Confederate troops were moved from Arkansas across the Mississippi River, he was placed in charge of the defense of Arkansas. At this time Arkansas was nearly defenseless; and Roane, with the newly appointed commander of the Trans-Mississippi District (also known as Department Number Two), Major-General Thomas Hindman, cobbled together a reasonable defensive force. Roane took part in numerous battles within the Trans-Mississippi Theater, including the battles of Whitney's Lane and Prairie Grove.

== Personal life ==
On February 1, 1855, Roane married Mary Kim Smith (1833–1907) of Dallas, Arkansas.

== Later life ==
Roane died in Jefferson County, Arkansas, and is buried at Oakland Cemetery, Little Rock.

== See also ==
- List of Arkansas adjutants general
- List of Confederate States Army generals
- List of governors of Arkansas
- List of people from Tennessee

Party political offices
Preceded by Thomas Drew	Democratic nominee for Governor of Arkansas; 1848	Succeeded by Elias Conway
Military offices
Preceded by Colonel Solon Borland	Adjutant General of Arkansas; 1848–1849	Succeeded by Colonel Allan Wood
Political offices
Preceded by Richard Byrd; Acting	Governor of Arkansas; 1849–1852	Succeeded by Elias Conway
