= Richard C. Byrd =

American politician

Acting Governor of Arkansas
- In office January 10, 1849 – April 19, 1849
- Preceded by: Thomas S. Drew
- Succeeded by: John S. Roane

6th President of the Arkansas Senate
- In office November 4, 1848 – November 4, 1850
- Preceded by: William K. Sebastian
- Succeeded by: John R. Hampton

Member of the Arkansas Senate from Arkansas, Jefferson and Desha counties
- In office November 2, 1846 – November 4, 1850
- Preceded by: J. Yell
- Succeeded by: N. B. Burrow

Member of the Arkansas Senate from Pulaski County
- In office November 2, 1840 – November 4, 1844
- Preceded by: New constituency
- Succeeded by: T. W. Newton

Member of the Arkansas Senate from Pulaski, White and Saline counties
- In office November 5, 1839 – November 2, 1840
- Preceded by: John McLean
- Succeeded by: Constituency abolished

Member of the Arkansas House of Representatives from Pulaski County
- In office September 12, 1836 – November 5, 1839 Serving with John H. Cocke
- Preceded by: New constituency
- Succeeded by: Absalom Fowler; L. Gibson

Member of the Arkansas Territory Legislative Council from Pulaski County
- In office October 7, 1833 – October 5, 1835 Serving with Samuel M. Rutherford
- Preceded by: Samuel M. Rutherford; Peter B. Crutchfield
- Succeeded by: William Gumming; Absalom Fowler

2nd Auditor of Arkansas Territory
- In office November 20, 1829 – November 5, 1831
- President: Andrew Jackson
- Preceded by: George W. Scott
- Succeeded by: Emzy Wilson

Personal details
- Born: ca. 1805 Mississippi Territory (present-day Alabama)
- Died: June 1, 1854 (aged 48–49) Jefferson County, Arkansas
- Resting place: Flat Bayou Cemetery, Jefferson County, Arkansas; 34°21′30.3″N 91°52′09.5″W
- Party: Democratic
- Spouses: Ann L. Byrd (div. 1835) Mary E. Byrd (died 1851) Rachael E. Byrd (m. 1852)

Richard C. Byrd (ca. 1805 – June 1, 1854) was an American politician who served as acting governor of Arkansas from January 10 to April 19, 1849, following the resignation of Thomas S. Drew.

== Biography ==
Byrd was born circa 1805 in Mississippi Territory (present-day Alabama). Byrd, merchant and farmer, moved to Arkansas in 1826. He served as the second auditor of Arkansas Territory from 1829 to 1831, and in the Territorial Legislature from 1833 to 1835. Byrd served as a member of the Arkansas House of Representatives in 1836, and the Arkansas Senate in 1840, 1842, 1846, and 1848.

Byrd had an unsuccessful gubernatorial run in 1844. When Governor Thomas S. Drew resigned from office on January 10, 1849, Byrd was president of the Senate and became acting governor. He left the office on April 19, 1849, and returned to his mercantile store in Jefferson County, Arkansas. Byrd died at his home in Jefferson County following a lengthy illness.

== See also ==
- List of governors of Arkansas

Political offices
Preceded by George W. Scott	Auditor of Arkansas Territory; 1829 – 1831	Succeeded by Emzy Wilson
Preceded by Samuel M. Rutherford; Peter B. Crutchfield	Member of the Arkansas Territory Legislative Council from Pulaski County; 1833 – 1835; With: Samuel M. Rutherford	Succeeded by William Gumming; Absalom Fowler
Preceded by Thomas S. Drew	Governor of Arkansas; Acting; 1849	Succeeded by John S. Roane
Arkansas House of Representatives
New constituency	Member of the Arkansas House of Representatives from Pulaski County; 1836 – 1839; With: John H. Cocke	Succeeded by Absalom Fowler; L. Gibson
Arkansas Senate
Preceded by John McLean	Member of the Arkansas Senate from Pulaski, White and Saline counties 1839 – 1840	Constituency abolished
New constituency	Member of the Arkansas Senate from Pulaski County; 1840 – 1844	Succeeded by T. W. Newton
Preceded by J. Yell	Member of the Arkansas Senate from Arkansas, Jefferson and Desha counties 1846 – 1850	Succeeded by N. B. Burrow
Preceded by William K. Sebastian	President of the Arkansas Senate; 1848 – 1850	Succeeded by John R. Hampton
