= Thomas S. Drew =

3rd Governor of Arkansas

Thomas Stevenson Drew
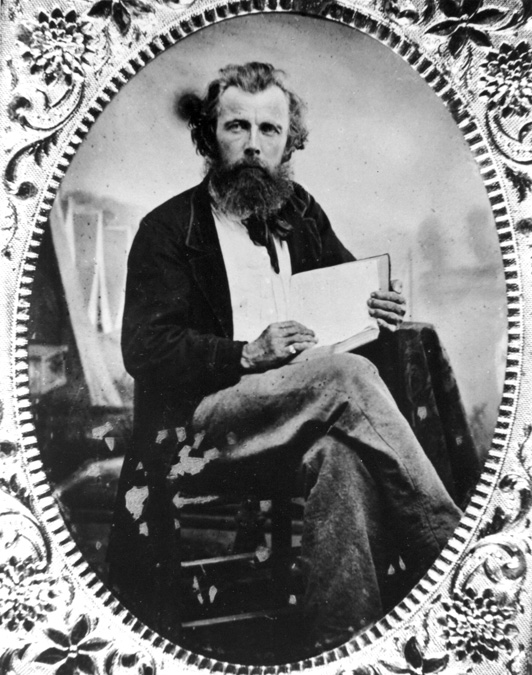

3rd Governor of Arkansas
- In office November 9, 1844 – January 10, 1849
- Preceded by: Samuel Adams (acting)
- Succeeded by: Richard C. Byrd

Personal details
- Born: August 25, 1802 Wilson County, Tennessee
- Died: January 1879 (aged 76) Lipan, Texas
- Party: Democratic

Thomas Stevenson Drew (August 25, 1802 – January 1879) was the third governor of the U.S. state of Arkansas.

== Biography ==
He was born in Wilson County, Tennessee. Drew moved with his family to Louisiana and then, in 1818, to Arkansas. He worked as a traveling salesman and school teacher. Drew first settled in Clark County and was appointed Clark County Clerk in 1823. In 1827 he moved to Pocahontas, Arkansas, and married Cinderella Bettis, daughter of the prosperous founder of that town, Ransom Bettis. His father-in-law gave the newlyweds 800 acres (3.2 km^{2}) of bottom land in Cherokee Bay, where the town of Biggers lies in what is now Randolph County (then Lawrence County) The Drews prospered, and their plantation included 20 African-American slaves.

In 1832, Drew was elected county judge of Lawrence County. In 1835, Drew and Bettis convinced the 9th General Assembly of Arkansas Territory to create Randolph County out of Lawrence County. In 1836, Drew and Bettis held an infamous free bar-b-que complete with free liquor for the entire county in Pocahontas (then known as Bettis Bluff). The grateful attendees the next day chose Pocahontas as the county seat in an upset election over the more populated community of Columbia. That same year, Drew gave the county land in downtown Pocahontas where a courthouse was constructed.

Drew was chosen as a delegate to the 1836 Arkansas Constitutional Convention. He was elected Governor in 1844 as a Democrat, supported by the Conway-Johnson family that ruled Arkansas from territorial days to the 1850s. His administration concentrated on the state's financial solvency and attempted to repair the state's credit and party disunity. Other achievements of his first administration were Arkansas becoming the first southern state to declare Thanksgiving to be a state holiday, and, at Cinderella's urging, he had legislation passed so that Arkansas became the first southern state to declare the property a woman brought to a marriage to be her own and not her husband's.

Drew was reelected in 1848. In 1849 he dispatched a militia to Marion County to put down the Tutt-Everett War. Drew only served a year of his second term before resigning due to the low salary provided for the governor. He retired from politics and worked to try and recover from financial losses. He was living in Sebastian County, Arkansas, in 1860. but eventually moved to Texas, initially to Weatherford, and later to Hood County. Drew died in January 1879 at Lipan, Texas.

Drew was originally buried in the Old Baptist Cemetery in Lipan, but his body was removed in 1923 by Arkansas officials and moved to the Masonic Cemetery in Pocahontas, where he rests today along with Bettis, Cinderella, and several of the Drew children.

Drew County, Arkansas was named for him.

Party political offices
Preceded by Archibald Yell	Democratic nominee for Governor of Arkansas; 1844, 1848	Succeeded by John Selden Roane
Political offices
Preceded by Samuel Adams; Acting	Governor of Arkansas; 1844–1849	Succeeded by Richard C. Byrd; Acting
