= List of justices of the Arkansas Supreme Court =

The following is a list of justices of the Arkansas Supreme Court. Article VI, Section 1, of the Arkansas Constitution of 1836 established a Supreme Court; Section 2 declared it would consist of three judges, including a chief justice.

The Reconstruction Constitution of 1868, which placed the state under military control, added two justices; the Arkansas Constitution of 1874 rolled back the expansion, but stipulated that once the population of the state should "amount to one million, the General Assembly may, if deemed necessary, increase the number of judges of the Supreme Court to five." In 1889, the population milestone was reached, and the legislature authorized a total of five justices. Constitutional sanction of the enlargement came in 1924 with voter approval of Amendment 9, which also allowed for the future legislative creation of two additional judgeships. Act 205 of 1925 further increased the number of justices to seven.

Note: Some early justices were able to be elected to positions they were appointed to. Ark. Const., Amendment 29, adopted in 1938, prohibited state, county, and city appointees from being elected to the same position.

== List of judges of the Superior Court of the Arkansas Territory ==
From 1819 to 1836, the highest court in the Arkansas Territory was the Superior Court, which consisted of presidentially-appointed judges who served four-year terms. The court was established with three judges, with a fourth added in 1828. Below is a list of the judges that constituted that court:

Judge	Date(s) of appointment	Appointing president(s)	Notes
Charles Jouett	March 3, 1819	Monroe	did not serve
Robert P. Letcher	March 3, 1819	Monroe	did not serve
Andrew Scott	March 3, 1819; December 9, 1822	Monroe	
Joseph Selden	May 10, 1820; January 5, 1824	Monroe	
John Thomson	May 10, 1820	Monroe	did not serve
Benjamin Johnson	January 18, 1821; December 13, 1824; December 11, 1828; December 11, 1832	Monroe; Monroe; J.Q. Adams; Jackson	
William Trimble	December 13, 1824; December 11, 1828	Monroe; J.Q. Adams	
Thomas P. Eskridge	March 1, 1827; January 31, 1831	J.Q. Adams; Jackson	
Edward Cross	May 21, 1830; December 16, 1833	Jackson	
Charles S. Bibb	February 1, 1832	Jackson	
Alexander M. Clayton	December 11, 1832	Jackson	
Thomas J. Lacy	March 17, 1834	Jackson	
Archibald Yell	January 7, 1835	Jackson	

== List of chief justices ==
Chief Justice	In office	Notes
Daniel Ringo	1836–1844	
Thomas Johnson	1845–1852	
George C. Watkins	1853–1854	
Elbert H. English	1855–1864	After May 6, 1861, the state was part of the Confederate States of America
Thomas D. W. Yonley	1864–1866	After April 9, 1865, the state was once again part of the USA
David Walker	1866–1868	Ousted by military commander
William W. Wilshire	1868–1871	
John McClure	1871–1874	Constitution of 1868; previously an associate justice (position 5)
Elbert H. English	1874–1884	
Sterling R. Cockrill	1884–1893	
Henry Gaston Bunn	1893–1904	Appointed; subsequently elected
Joseph M. Hill	1904–1909	
Edgar A. McCulloch	1909–1927	Appointed; subsequently elected
Jesse C. Hart	1927–1933	
Cecil E. Johnson	1933–1936	
Griffin Smith	1937–1955	
Lee Seamster	1955–1956	Appointed
Carleton Harris	1957–1980	
John A. Fogleman	1980	Appointed; previously an associate justice (position 6)
Richard B. Adkisson	1980–1984	
Webster Hubbell	1984	Appointed by Governor Bill Clinton
Jack Holt Jr.	1985–1995	
Bradley D. Jesson	1995–1996	Appointed
W. H. "Dub" Arnold	1997–2003	
Betty Dickey	2004	Appointed
Jim Hannah	2005–2015	Previously an associate justice (position 5)
Howard W. Brill	2015–2016	Appointed by Governor Asa Hutchinson
John Dan Kemp	2017–2025	
Karen R. Baker	2025–present	

== List of associate justices ==
=== Position 2 ===
Associate Justice (position 2)	In office	Notes
Townsend Dickinson	1836–1842	
George W. Paschal	1843	
William K. Sebastian	1843–1844	
Williamson Simpson Oldham	1845–1848	
Christopher C. Scott	1848–1859	
Henry Massey Rector	1859–1860	
Hulbert F. Fairchild	1860–1864	
Albert Pike	1864–1865	appointed
Charles A. Harper	1865–1866	
Freeman W. Compton	1866–1868	ousted by military commander
Lafayette Gregg	1868–1874	Constitution of 1868
David Walker	1874–1878	
Jesse Turner	1878	
John R. Eakin	1878–1885	
Burrill B. Battle	1885–1910	
William F. Kirby	1910–1916	
Thomas H. Humphreys	1916–1942	appointed
R. W. Robins	1943–1949	
Robert A. Leflar	1949–1950	appointed
Sam Dunn Robinson	1951–1965	
Osro Cobb	1965–1966	appointed
J. Fred Jones	1967–1977	
Elsijane Trimble Roy	1977	appointed
George Howard Jr.	1977–1978	appointed
John I. Purtle	1979–1989	
Otis H. Turner	1990	appointed
Donald L. Corbin	1991–2014	
Robin F. Wynne	2014–2023	
J. Cody Hiland	2023–2025	appointed
Courtney Rae Hudson	2025–present	

=== Position 3 ===
Associate Justice (position 3)	In office	Notes
Thomas J. Lacy	1836–1845	
Edward Cross	1845–1846	
William Conway	1847–1848	
David Walker	1849–1855	
Thomas Burton Hanly	1856–1858	
Felix Ives Batson	1859	
Freeman W. Compton	1859–1864	Confederate
John J. Clendenin	1866–1868	
Thomas M. Bowen	1868–1871	
John E. Bennett	1871–1874	
Freeman W. Compton	1874	appointed
William M. Harrison	1874–1882	
William W. Smith	1882–1888	
Monte H. Sandels	1889–1890	
William W. Mansfield	1891–1894	
James E. Riddick	1894–1907	appointed; subsequently elected
Jesse C. Hart	1907–1927	appointed; subsequently elected
Edgar L. McHaney	1927–1948	
Charles C. Wine	1948	appointed
George Rose Smith	1949–1987	
Tom Glaze	1987–2008	
Elana Wills	2008–2010	appointed
Courtney Rae Hudson	2010–2025	
J. Cody Hiland	2025–present	appointed

=== Position 4 ===
Associate Justice (position 4)	In office	Notes
William M. Harrison	1868–3123	Constitution of 1868
Marshall L. Stephenson	1873	Constitution of 1868
Wilson E. Hemingway	1889–1893	
Richard H. Powell	1893	appointed
Carroll D. Wood	1893–1929	
Turner Butler	1929–1938	
William R. Donham	1938	appointed
J. Seaborn Holt	1938–1961	
Neill Bohlinger	1961–1962	appointed
J. Frank Holt	1963–1966	
Hugh M. Bland	1966	appointed
Conley Byrd	1967–1980	
Richard Mays	1980	appointed
Robert H. Dudley	1981–1996	
Ray Thornton	1997–2004	
Jim Gunter	2005–2012	
Josephine L. Hart	2012–2020	
Barbara Womack Webb	2021–present	

=== Position 5 ===
Associate Justice (position 5)	In office	Notes
John E. McClure	1868–1871	Constitution of 1868
Elhanan J. Searle	1871–1873	Constitution of 1868
Simon Pollard Hughes Jr.	1889–1904	
Edgar A. McCulloch	1904–1909	
Samuel Frauenthal	1909–1912	appointed
Frank G. Smith	1912–1949	
Edwin Dunaway	1949–1950	appointed
Paul Ward	1951–1968	
J. Frank Holt	1969–1983	
P. A. "Les" Hollingsworth	1984	appointed
David Newbern	1985–1998	
Lavenski Smith	1999–2000	appointed
Jim Hannah	2001–2004	elected Chief Justice
Betty Dickey	2005–2006	appointed
Paul Danielson	2006–2016	
Shawn Womack	2017–present	

=== Position 6 ===
Associate Justice (position 6)	In office	Notes
William F. Kirby	1927–1934	
Basil Baker	1934–1941	
Karl Greenhaw	1941–1942	appointed
Ben Carter	1943	
Robert C. Knox	1943–1944	appointed
Minor W. Millwee	1945–1958	
William J. Smith	1958	appointed
James D. Johnson	1959–1966	
Guy Amsler	1966	appointed
John A. Fogleman	1967–1980	appointed Chief Justice
John F. Stroud Jr.	1980	appointed
Steele Hays	1981–1994	
Andree Layton Roaf	1995–1996	appointed
Annabelle Clinton Imber Tuck	1997–2009	
William H. Bowen	2010	appointed
Ronald Lee Sheffield	2010	appointed
Karen R. Baker	2010–2025	
Nicholas Bronni	2025–present	appointed

=== Position 7 ===
Associate Justice (position 7)	In office	Notes
James W. Mehaffy	1927	died before assuming office
Tom M. Mehaffy	1927–1942	appointed; subsequently elected
Ed F. McFaddin	1943–1966	
Lyle Brown	1967–1975	
Elsijane Trimble Roy	1975–1977	appointed
Darrell Hickman	1977–1990	
Dale Price	1990	
Robert L. Brown	1991–2012	
Cliff Hoofman	2013–2014	
Rhonda K. Wood	2015–present	
