= Mansfield (surname) =

Mansfield is an English surname derived from the town of Mansfield in Nottinghamshire or a similar toponym. It can also be a variant of the surname Mansell or Maunsell, as can be illustrated by the case of the politician and Royal Navy Admiral Sir Robert Mansell.

Notable people with this surname include the following:

- Alan Mansfield (1902–1980), Australian judge, Governor of Queensland
- Arabella Mansfield (1846–1911), first American female lawyer
- Brian Mansfield (born 1963), American writer and journalist
- Bruce Mansfield (1944–2016), Australian television and radio personality
- Charles Mansfield (disambiguation)
- Comins Mansfield (1896–1984), British chess player and problem composer
- Darrell Mansfield, American gospel and blues musician
- David Mansfield (born 1956), American musician
- Edward Mansfield (disambiguation)
- Edwin Mansfield, (1930–1997), economist, professor at the University of Pennsylvania
- Eric Mansfield (disambiguation)
- Eversley Mansfield (1886–1954), English footballer
- Fred Mansfield (1915–1992), English footballer
- Frederick Mansfield (1877–1958), American politician, Mayor of Boston
- George Allen Mansfield (1834–1908), Australian architect
- Gerard Mansfield (1921–2006), British Royal Navy vice admiral
- Gordon H. Mansfield (1941–2013), American Army veteran, Deputy United States Secretary of Veterans Affairs
- Harvey Mansfield (born 1932), American professor of government and conservative political commentator
- Henry Mansfield (died 1328), English medieval theologian, philosopher, churchman, and university chancellor
- James Mansfield (1733–1821), British lawyer, judge and politician
- James Mansfield (cricketer, born 1860) (1860–1930), Tasmanian cricketer
- James Mansfield (cricketer, born 1862) (1862–1932), English cricketer
- Jared Mansfield (1759–1830), American mathematician and surveyor
- Jaymes Mansfield (born 1990), American drag queen and TV personality
- Jayne Mansfield (1933–1967), American actress and sex symbol
- Jayne Marie Mansfield (born 1950), American actress and model
- Jeremy Mansfield (1963–2022), South African radio and television personality
- Jerry Mansfield (1892–1960), American football player
- John Mansfield (disambiguation)
- Joseph K. Mansfield (1803–1862), Union army general in the American Civil War
- Joseph J. Mansfield (1861–1947), American Congress representative from Texas
- Katherine Mansfield (1888–1923), New Zealand author
- Keith Mansfield (born 1941), British composer and arranger
- Keith Mansfield (writer) (born 1965), English writer and publisher
- Ken Mansfield (1937–2022), American record executive
- Marie Mansfield (born 1931), American baseball player
- Martha Mansfield (1899–1923), American actress
- Michael Mansfield (born 1941), English barrister
- Michael Mansfield (footballer) (born 1971), former Australian rules footballer
- Mike Mansfield (1903–2001), American politician and diplomat
- Peter Mansfield (1933–2017), British physicist and pioneer of MRI
- Portia Mansfield (1887–1979), American dance educator and choreographer
- Ray Mansfield (1941–1996), American football player
- Richard Mansfield (1857–1907), Anglo-American stage actor
- Sally Mansfield (1920–2001), American actress
- Shaylee Mansfield (born 2009), deaf American actress and YouTuber
- Stephen Mansfield (born 1958), American author
- Tony Mansfield (hurler) (1939–2013), Irish hurler
- Tony Mansfield (born 1955), English songwriter, musician and record producer
- Walter R. Mansfield (1911–1987), American federal judge
- Wayne Mansfield, Australian-based marketer and convicted spammer
- William Mansfield, 1st Baron Sandhurst (1819–1876), British Army general
- Mansfield (All-England cricketer, 1778)

== See also ==
- Justice Mansfield (disambiguation)
