= Ekins =

Ekins may refer to:

People

- Ekins (surname)

Ships

- HMS Ekins (K552), a British frigate that served in the Royal Navy from 1943 to 1945

== See also ==
- Eakins
- Ekin
- Ekins Island
- George Ekins Browne
