= David Walker (Arkansas politician) =

American politician (1806–1879)

The Honorable David Walker
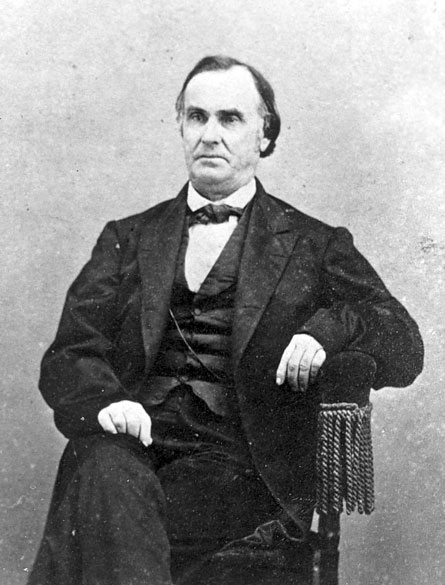

Chief Justice of the Arkansas Supreme Court
- In office 1866–1868
- Preceded by: Thomas D. W. Yonley
- Succeeded by: W.W. Wilshire

Associate Justice of the Arkansas Supreme Court
- In office 1849–1855
- Preceded by: William Conway
- Succeeded by: Thomas B. Hanly

Member of the Arkansas Senate from the Washington County district
- In office November 2, 1840 – November 4, 1844 Serving with O. Evans and Mark Bean
- Preceded by: redistricted
- Succeeded by: Robert McCamy

Member of the Territorial General Assembly
- In office October 5, 1835 – November 16, 1835

Personal details
- Born: February 19, 1806 Elkton, Kentucky
- Died: September 30, 1879 (aged 73) Fayetteville, Arkansas
- Spouse: Jane Lewis Washington (m. 1833)
- Children: Jacob Wythe Walker; Charles Whiting Walker; Mary Walker
- Relatives: James D. Walker (cousin)
- Occupation: Lawyer, judge, politician

Military service
- Allegiance: Confederate States of America
- Branch/service: Confederate States Army
- Years of service: 1863-1864
- Rank: Colonel

David Walker (February 19, 1806 – September 30, 1879) was an American lawyer, politician, and judge and notable early settler of Fayetteville, Arkansas. Walker served on the Arkansas Supreme Court for a total of eight years, including two years as chief justice.

== Early life and career ==
Walker was born near Elkton, Kentucky on February 19, 1806, to Jacob Wythe Walker and Nancy Hawkins Walker, members of a prominent family in the Southern United States. He grew up with little formal schooling and read law by himself. In 1830, Walker moved to Arkansas, where he was examined to become a lawyer by Ben Johnson and Edward Cross before moving to Fayetteville, Arkansas, a small settlement in northwestern Arkansas, with $2.75 ($30 in today's dollars) in his pocket.

== Political career ==
He became active in Whig politics and was elected to a two-year term as prosecuting attorney for the Third Circuit Court of Arkansas Territory beginning September 13, 1833. He was re-elected in 1834, but resigned following election to the 9th Arkansas Territorial General Assembly. Walker was elected to the state constitutional convention which authored the 1836 Arkansas Constitution. Walker also engaged in land speculation and other business with Archibald Yell, another prominent early settler of Fayetteville. Together Walker, Yell, and William Haile founded the town of Ozark, Arkansas in the Arkansas River Valley, and later using political power to establish the Ozark Turnpike Company, which built a road between Fayetteville and Ozark which was subsequently designated as Arkansas Highway 23 and known as the Pig Trail Scenic Byway.

Walker won election to the Arkansas Senate in 1839, representing Washington County alongside two other men, and served in the 3rd Arkansas General Assembly and the 4th Arkansas General Assembly. Walker resigned from the General Assembly to run for Arkansas's at-large congressional district in the 1844 election as the Whig party candidate. Yell sought the seat for the Democrats, having held the seat as a Arkansas's first congressman after statehood in 1836, now seeking a return following two terms as Governor of Arkansas. The bumptious Yell defeated a restrained, Whiggish Walker, though the two avoided personal attacks during the campaign.

Having become one of the most wealthy citizens in the region, in addition to his law practice, Walker raised cattle and grew grains and fruit on a 1,000 acres (400 ha) farm on the West Fork of the White River with twenty-three slaves. In 1845, he also built a home in Fayetteville, preserved today as the Walker-Stone House. Walker retired from politics to practice law and manage his agricultural interests in Fayetteville during the Whig Party's decline. Though he detested the largely corrupt Democrats, he also vehemently opposed the national Republican platform toward slavery, which was impotent in Arkansas. Walker, along with other former Whigs, began to support the Constitutional Union Party as secession grew in prominence.

== Secession Convention ==
Following the election of Abraham Lincoln and subsequent South Carolina Declaration of Secession, secession became an important issue in Arkansas. Voters approved convening a Secession Convention to discuss the matter; Walker was nominated as a unionist delegate to the meeting. Upon convening on March 5, 1861, the slim unionist majority elected Walker as president of the body by a 40–35 vote. Walker and other northwestern Arkansas unionists lodged together in Little Rock and strategized together in the evenings to resist the calls for secession by the southeast Arkansas delegates. Ultimately, the convention decided to put the question of secession to the voters, setting an election for August 5, 1861, and adjourned subject to recall by the president of the convention. After Confederate guns fired on Fort Sumter and President Lincoln issued a call for support from the states, many advocated for recalling the convention, but others were opposed. Convention President Walker issued a proclamation calling for the convention to reconvene on May 6. Walker was vilified as faithless by Washington County voters, and the press for reconvening the "Secession Convention" despite being elected as a unionist. Walker published an address acknowledging his awkward position and explaining his decision to reconvene the session.

Some Unionists still wanted a vote of the people on the issue of secession, but that was rejected by a 55–15 margin by the convention. In the final vote, the delegates approved the Arkansas Ordinance of Secession in a vote of 69 to 1. Walker had requested a re-vote to produce a unanimous decision to present a unified front, but Isaac Murphy remained opposed.

== Civil War ==
After closing the convention with Arkansas's secession decided and entry into the Confederate States of America underway, Walker returned to his home and resumed farming. Over time, Union troops and roving marauders ravaged his property and radicalized the former Whig into a supporter of the Confederate States of America. Walker left the area shortly after the Battle of Prairie Grove for Lewisburg in the Arkansas River Valley. In 1863, he accepted a commission as a colonel, serving as a judge for a military court. Walker's court made death-sentence decisions that had repercussions into the Reconstruction era.

== Personal life ==
Walker was a major booster in early Fayetteville. In the 1840s, Walker donated land near his home to the Fayetteville Female Seminary and helped establish the non-sectarian and apolitical Far West Seminary with Isaac Murphy, Cephas Washburn, Jesse Bushyhead, and John S. Phelps. The seminary's charter was approved by the state despite heavy Democratic opposition, but the building burned shortly before the school opened. After the Civil War, Walker worked with fellow Fayetteville booster Lafayette Gregg to help secure Fayetteville as home of the new Arkansas Industrial University (now the University of Arkansas).

== See also ==
- Archibald Yell
