= Newbern =

Newbern, Newberne or New Bern may refer to:

== People ==
- David Newbern (born 1937), justice of the Arkansas Supreme Court
- George Newbern (born 1964), American actor
- Hambone Willie Newbern (1901–1965), American blues musician
- Melvin Newbern (born 1967), American basketball player

== Places in the United States ==
- Newbern, Alabama
- Newbern, Indiana
- New Bern, North Carolina
- Newbern, Ohio
- Newbern, Tennessee
- Newbern, Virginia
- Newberne, West Virginia

== Other uses ==
- New Bern, Kansas, a fictional city in the TV series Jericho
- USS New Berne, a Union navy steamer during the American Civil War
