= Eakin =

Eakin is an English surname. Notable people with the surname include:

- Bruce Eakin (born 1962), Canadian ice-hockey player
- Chris Eakin, British newsreader
- Cody Eakin (born 1991), Canadian ice-hockey player
- Douglas Holtz-Eakin (born 1958), American economist
- Harvey Eakin (1926–1973), former NASCAR Cup Series driver
- Jake Lee Eakin, American murderer
- John R. Eakin (1822–1885), Justice of the Arkansas Supreme Court
- Kay Eakin (1917–1993), American football player
- Kevin Eakin (born 1981), American football quarterback
- Michael Eakin (born 1948), American judge
- Richard M. Eakin (1910–1999), American zoologist
- Richard R. Eakin (1938–2025), American academic administrator, chancellor of East Carolina University
- Robert Eakin (1848–1917), American judge
- Sue Eakin (1918–2009), American professor
- William Eakin (1828–1918), Canadian politician

== See also ==
- Eakins
- Justice Eakin (disambiguation)
