= Elbert H. English =

American judge (1816–1884)

The Honorable Elbert H. English
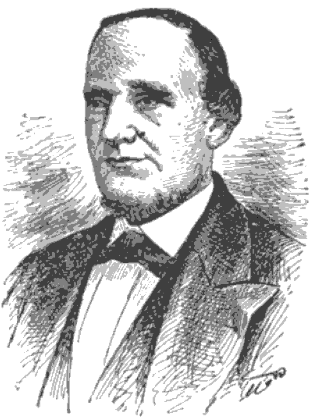

Chief Justice of the Arkansas Supreme Court
- In office 1855–1864
- Appointed by: Arkansas General Assembly
- Preceded by: George C. Watkins
- Succeeded by: Thomas D. W. Yonley
- In office 1874–1884
- Preceded by: John McClure
- Succeeded by: Sterling R. Cockrill

Personal details
- Party: Democratic Party
- Occupation: Lawyer and judge

Elbert Hartwell English (March 6, 1816 – September 1, 1884) was chief justice of the Arkansas Supreme Court from 1855 to 1864, and again from 1874 to 1884.

Born in Madison County, Alabama, he went through an academy at Athens, Alabama, and after some hesitation about a calling in life, opened a shop as a silversmith; this was described as "an episode in his life of which he was always strangely ashamed and to which he never referred". He then studied medicine, but finally settled upon the law. He read law to gain admission to the bar at Athens, in 1839, and served two terms in the Alabama Legislature. In 1844 he moved to Little Rock, Arkansas, and opened an office, and in a few months was made reporter of the supreme court.

In 1846, he was appointed by the legislature to revise the statutes of the state, and in 1848 was a candidate for a seat on the state supreme court to which Judge Walker was elected. In 1854, upon the resignation of Judge George C. Watkins, English was elected chief justice by the Arkansas General Assembly. He was re-elected in 1860 and held the place during the American Civil War until the Union supplanted the Confederate state government. After the war he returned to the private practice of law. Upon the termination of the Reconstruction era in 1874, he was appointed chief justice by Governor of Arkansas Elisha Baxter. He was later elected chief justice by the people under the 1874 Arkansas Constitution for an 8 year term. Upon the expiration of his official term in 1882 he was again elected, but died two years into the term.

An analysis of his jurisprudence said:

He was not especially technical, but he was very conservative, and when technicalities had become imbedded in the law, he enforced them. With him the rule of stare decisis was one that was not to be shaken. His aim was to declare the law as it was, not as it should have been. The duty of supplying its imperfections, of mitigating its hardships, he left to the legislature, where it properly belongs. He did not strive to be original.

English died at Asheville, North Carolina, at the age of 68.

Political offices
Preceded by George C. Watkins	Justice of the Arkansas Supreme Court; 1855–1864	Succeeded by Thomas D. W. Yonley
Preceded by John E. McClure	Justice of the Arkansas Supreme Court; 1874–1884	Succeeded by Sterling R. Cockrill
