= Bradley D. Jesson =

American judge (1932–2016)

Bradley Dean Jesson (January 26, 1932 – January 11, 2016) was chief justice of the Arkansas Supreme Court from 1995 to 1996.

== Early life, education, and career ==
Born in Bartlesville, Oklahoma and raised largely in Coffeyville, Kansas, he received a bachelor's degree from the University of Tulsa in 1954. Jesson served for three years in the United States Army Judge Advocate General's Corps, then moved to Fayetteville, Arkansas, where he received his law degree from the University of Arkansas School of Law in 1959. He served as a law clerk to U.S. District Judge John E. Miller, and then entered the private practice of law. Jesson became close friends with attorney Dale Bumpers, who was later elected Governor, and named Jesson to chair the Democratic Party of Arkansas, and to serve on the University of Arkansas Board of Trustees.

== Judicial service ==
In 1995, Governor Jim Guy Tucker appointed Jesson as chief justice of the Arkansas Supreme Court, to complete the remaining two years of the term of retiring Chief Justice Jack Holt Jr. In that capacity, Jesson presided over the controversial case of the West Memphis Three, three men convicted as teenagers in the murders of three boys in West Memphis, Arkansas. The conviction was upheld, though Jesson would later express reservations about the outcome. In 2004, Jesson and another retired justice, David Newbern, were appointed by the court to serve as special masters to review a state effort to consolidate the Lake View School District into another school district. Jesson and Newbern found problems with the state's proposals, which were ultimately resolved in 2007.

== Personal life and death ==
While studying at the University of Tulsa, Jesson met Mary Ellen Everett of Sand Springs, Oklahoma, whom he would eventually marry. She became a school teacher, and they had four daughters together.

Jesson died at the age of 83, ten days after the death of his longtime friend, Dale Bumpers. Jesson, who was hospitalized at the time due to heart disease, had hoped to be well enough to attend Bumpers' funeral, but instead had to listen to it on the radio from the hospital. Jesson was buried at the Oak Cemetery, in Fort Smith, Arkansas.

Political offices
Preceded by Jack Holt Jr.	Chief Justice of the Arkansas Supreme Court; 1995–1996	Succeeded by W. H. "Dub" Arnold
