= Elhanan J. Searle =

American judge (1835–1906)

Elhanan Searle
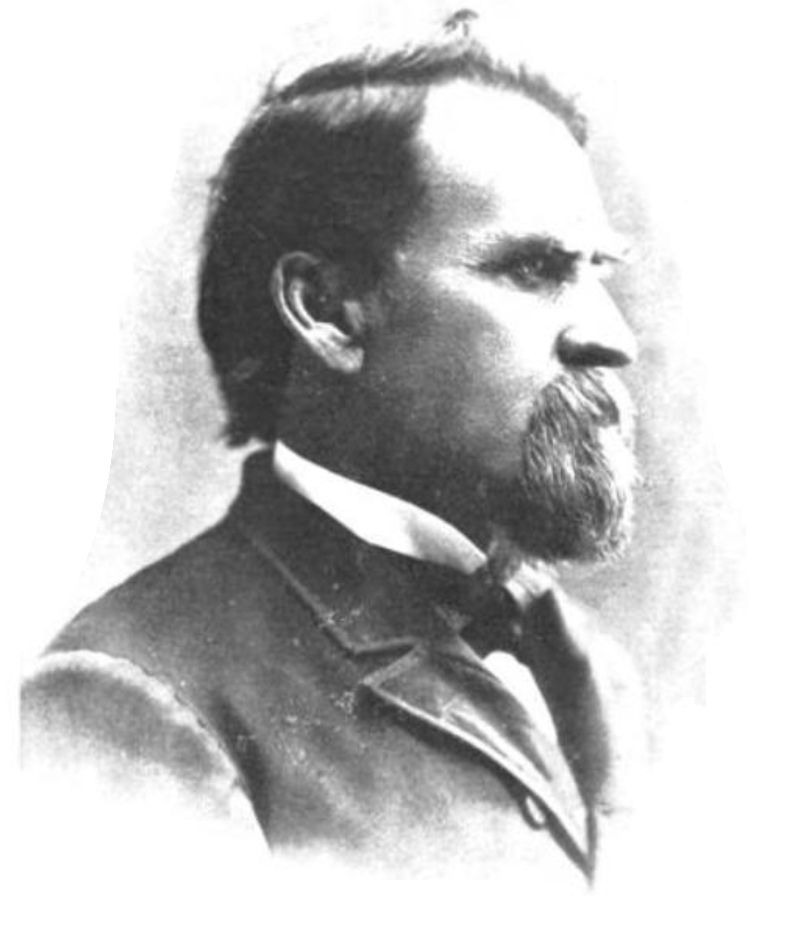

Associate Justice of the Arkansas Supreme Court
- In office 1871–1873
- Preceded by: John E. McClure
- Succeeded by: Simon Pollard Hughes Jr.
- Nominated by: Powell Clayton

Elhanan John Searle (January 18, 1835 – August 18, 1906) was an American lawyer, soldier and jurist who served as an associate justice on the Arkansas Supreme Court from 1871 to 1873.

== Early life and education ==
Born in Royalton, Ohio, his family moved to Rock Island County, Illinois, two years later. Searle attended Mount Morris College, and later the Northwestern University. Following his college graduation, Searle studied law under John Lourie Beveridge in Chicago until November 1859, when Beveridge was elected governor of the state. Searle then transferred to Springfield and studied under the law office of Abraham Lincoln and William Herndon. In 1861 Searle completed his study and passed the bar exam, however the same year the American Civil War broke out and he rushed to volunteer.

== Service in the Civil War ==
Searle declined preferential treatment offered to him by President Abraham Lincoln, and on September 23, 1861, enlisted in Company H, 10th Illinois Infantry Regiment, at Springfield as a private. He served in that capacity until July 7, 1862, when he was made captain of his company. His duties carried him into Arkansas as a recruiting officer. He was instrumental in recruiting and sending into the field the First Arkansas Infantry, and the Second and Fourth Arkansas Cavalry, these regiments being organized largely from the mountainous districts of the Ozarks. Upon its organization, he was made lieutenant-colonel of the First Arkansas Infantry, and was in command of that regiment for the greater part of three years, the colonel, himself, being absent from his command, and his duties naturally de-devolving upon the officer next in rank. While in command of his regiment, Searle participated in more than forty engagements and skirmishes. Searle escaped injury, although in different battles three horses were shot from under him. He often acted as brigadier-general in command of the brigade of which his regiment formed a part, and was placed in command of a number of important posts. For several months he was provost-marshal of a military department, and frequently was called upon to act as a member of military commissions and courts-martial. Searle was honorably discharged from the service on August 10, 1865.

== Legal career ==
After the war, Searle settled at Fort Smith, Arkansas, and resumed the practice of law. On February 19, 1866, he was commissioned prosecuting attorney for the Ninth Judicial District of Arkansas, a district which comprised eight counties. Some time after this he was appointed United States Commissioner for the Western District of Arkansas, which included not only the western part of Arkansas, but all of Indian Territory as well. He also served as assistant United States District Attorney until January 1, 1867, when he was commissioned by the provisional governor of Arkansas as circuit judge of the Ninth Judicial Circuit of that state, his appointment being approved by the United States military authorities. He served as circuit judge until February 10, 1871, when he was appointed to a two-year term as one of the justices of the Supreme Court of Arkansas.

On May 3, 1872, men claiming to be acting on behalf of supporters of Arkansas gubernatorial candidate Elisha Baxter hijacked a train from Memphis, Tennessee, and purported to arrest Searle and fellow justice John E. Bennett, thinking that the Court would be unable to rule without a quorum of judges. Baxter denied that they were acting under his direction. The judges were taken to Benton, Arkansas. For several days, their whereabouts were unknown to the public and federal officials began a search for the Justices. Justice Bennett was able to send a letter to Captain Rose demanding to know why they were being held by the Governor of Arkansas. Upon receipt of the letter, troops were sent to Benton to retrieve the two judges, but they had already escaped by May 6, and made their way to Little Rock. At the expiration of his appointed term, Searle was elected a term of eight years, but this was cut short by the adoption of a new state constitution.

For several years Searle served as a member of the Arkansas State Board of Education and also a member of the board of trustees of the Arkansas State University, which he helped to found, and of which he drafted the plan of government and instruction to be followed in all departments. He was also a member of its executive and building committees.

== Later life ==
In 1875 Searle moved to Chicago, Illinois, where he practiced law for a few years, taking part as counsel in a number of important cases, and taking an active part in the 1876 United States presidential election, filling nearly all the speaking engagements of John A. Logan, who was ill. Later, Searle practiced law for a time in St. Louis, and then in Pana, Illinois, till 1885. He then spent two years in travel, and in 1887 retired to Rock Island County, purchasing the well known Rodman home, where he resided until his death. He also purchased the valuable farm in Zuma Township, Rock Island County, where he had spent his boyhood.

== Personal life and death ==
On April 1, 1863, Searle married Cassie R. Pierce, who survived him. They had six children, of whom two were living at the time of Searle's death.

Searle died at St. Anthony's Hospital in Rock Island at the age of 71.

Political offices
Preceded by John E. McClure	Justice of the Arkansas Supreme Court; 1871–1873	Succeeded by Simon Pollard Hughes Jr.
