= Justice Knox =

Justice Knox may refer to:

- Adrian Knox (1863–1932), second Chief Justice of Australia
- John C. Knox (Pennsylvania judge) (1817–1880), associate justice of the Pennsylvania Supreme Court
- John Leonard Knox (1925–2015), British High Court judge, sitting in the Chancery division
- Robert C. Knox (1892–1947), justice of the Arkansas Supreme Court

== See also ==
- Judge Knox (disambiguation)
