= Justice Mansfield =

Justice Mansfield may refer to:

- Edward Mansfield (judge) (born 1957), associate justice of the Iowa Supreme Court
- William W. Mansfield (1830–1912), associate justice of the Arkansas Supreme Court
