= 1886 Arkansas gubernatorial election =

- September 6, 1886
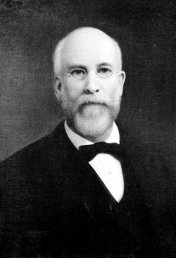

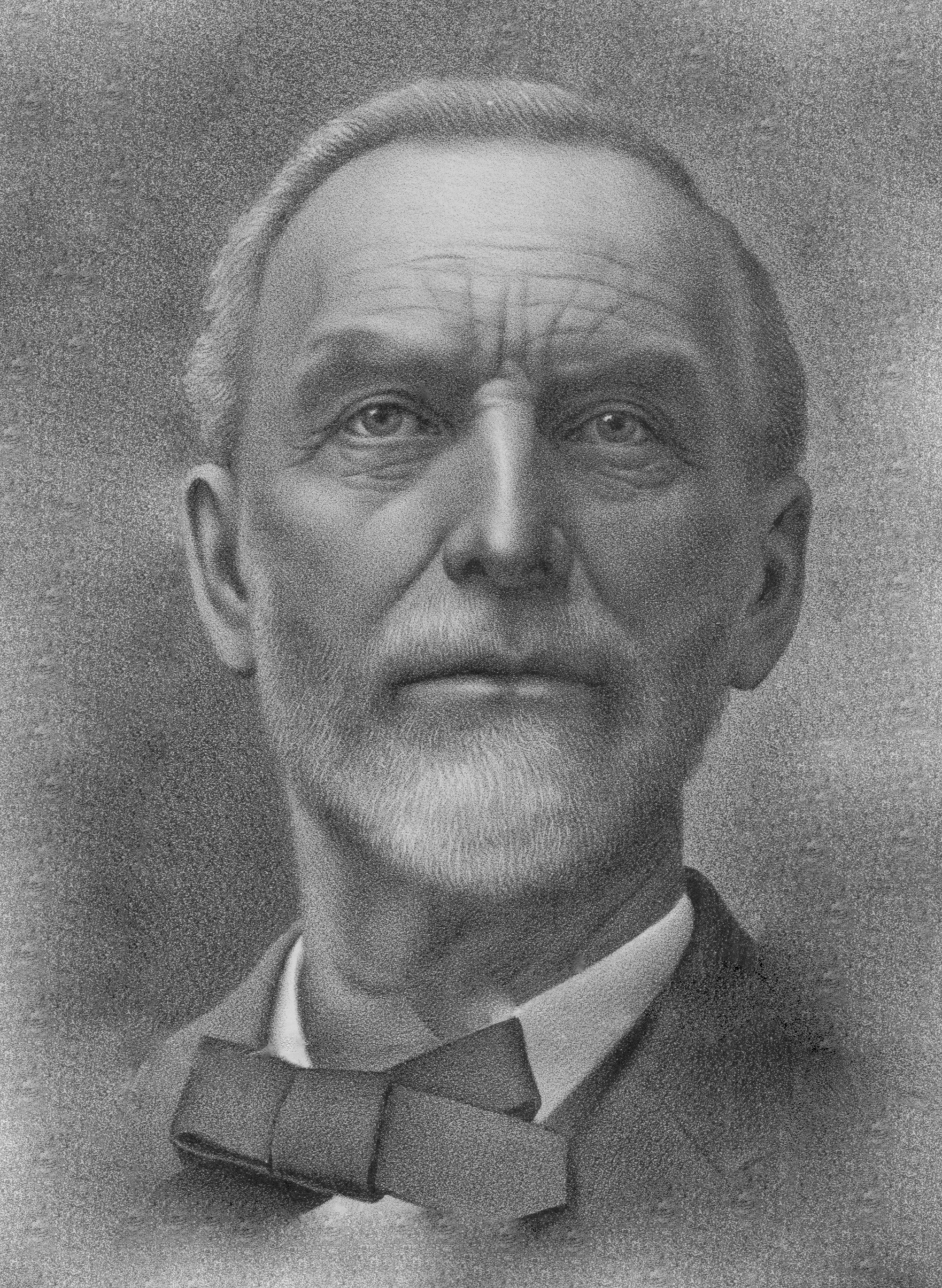
Nominee	Simon Pollard Hughes Jr.	Lafayette Gregg	Charles E. Cunningham
Party	Democratic	Republican	Agricultural Wheel
Popular vote	90,650	54,063	19,169
Percentage	55.31%	32.99%	11.70%
- County results Hughes: 30–40% 40–50% 50–60% 60–70% 70–80% 80–90% >90% Gregg: 30–40% 40–50% 50–60% 60–70% 70–80% 80–90% Cunningham: 50–60%
Governor before election
Simon Pollard Hughes Jr.
Democratic
Elected Governor
Simon Pollard Hughes Jr.
Democratic

The 1886 Arkansas gubernatorial election was held on September 6, 1886.

Incumbent Democratic Governor Simon Pollard Hughes Jr. defeated Republican nominee Lafayette Gregg and Agricultural Wheel nominee Charles E. Cunningham with 55.31% of the vote.

== General election ==
=== Candidates ===
- Simon Pollard Hughes Jr., Democratic, incumbent Governor
- Lafayette Gregg, Republican, former Justice of the Arkansas Supreme Court and former trustee of Arkansas Industrial University
- Charles E. Cunningham, Agricultural Wheel, Greenback candidate for Arkansas's at-large congressional district in 1882 United States House of Representatives elections in Arkansas

=== Results ===
1886 Arkansas gubernatorial election
Party	Candidate	Votes	%	±%
Democratic	Simon Pollard Hughes Jr. (incumbent)	90,650	55.31%	
Republican	Lafayette Gregg	54,063	32.99%	
Agricultural Wheel	Charles E. Cunningham	19,169	11.70%	
Majority		36,587	22.32%	
Turnout		163,882		
Democratic hold		Swing		
