= Justice Hays =

Justice Hays may refer to:

- Charles Thomas Hays (1869–1949), associate justice of the Supreme Court of Missouri
- Jack D. H. Hays (1917–1995), associate justice of the Arizona Supreme Court
- Norman R. Hays (1891–1966), associate justice of the Iowa Supreme Court
- Steele Hays (1925–2011), associate justice of the Arkansas Supreme Court

== See also ==
- Justice Hayes (disambiguation)
- Judge Hays (disambiguation)
