= Judge Hays =

Judge Hays may refer to:

- Paul R. Hays (1903–1980), judge of the United States Court of Appeals for the Second Circuit
- William Hercules Hays (1820–1880), judge of the United States District Court for the District of Kentucky

== See also ==
- Judge Hay (disambiguation)
- Judge Hayes (disambiguation)
- Justice Hays (disambiguation)
