= Justice Hickman =

Justice Hickman may refer to:

- Alex Hickman (1925–2016), chief justice of the Trial Division of the Supreme Court of Newfoundland
- Darrell Hickman (born 1935), List of justices of the Arkansas Supreme Court
- J. E. Hickman (1883–1962), List of justices of the Texas Supreme Court
