= Thomas Johnson (Arkansas judge) =

American judge (1808–1878)

The Honorable Thomas Johnson

Arkansas Attorney General
- In office 1856–1858
- Preceded by: John J. Clendenin
- Succeeded by: J. L. Hollowell

Chief Justice of the Arkansas Supreme Court
- In office 1845–1852
- Appointed by: Arkansas General Assembly
- Preceded by: Daniel Ringo
- Succeeded by: George C. Watkins

Personal details
- Born: H. Thomas Johnson; December 29, 1808 Salisbury, Maryland
- Died: March 25, 1878 (aged 69) Little Rock, Arkansas
- Resting place: Mount Holly Cemetery, Little Rock, Arkansas
- Party: Democratic Party
- Spouse: Louisa Crease
- Children: 4
- Relatives: George C. Watkins (brother in law)
- Occupation: Lawyer and judge

H. Thomas Johnson (December 29, 1808 – March 25, 1878) was chief justice of the Arkansas Supreme Court from 1845 to 1852.

Born in Maryland, Johnson moved to St. Louis, Missouri in the autumn of 1834 and to Batesville, Arkansas in January, 1836.

Johnson made connections to the Conway-Johnson family through his marriage to Louisa Crease in 1839. In 1840, Johnson was elected as 3rd Circuit Judge in Northeast Arkansas. In 1844, the Democratic Party-dominated Arkansas General Assembly elected Johnson to be chief justice of the Arkansas Supreme Court following the expiration of Judge Daniel Ringo's term. Ringo was a Whig. Soon after his seating on the supreme court, he moved to Little Rock. Johnson served as chief justice until 1852. In 1877, he died at his home in Little Rock, at the age of 69.

He was a tall, darkhaired, thin, "dry man, of great honesty and uprightness of character".

Political offices
Preceded by Daniel Ringo	Chief Justice of the Arkansas Supreme Court; 1845–1852	Succeeded by George C. Watkins
