= Justice Harper =

Justice Harper may refer to:

- Charles A. Harper (born c. 1815), associate justice of the Arkansas Supreme Court
- Lubbie Harper Jr. (born 1942), associate justice of the Connecticut Supreme Court

== See also ==
- Judge Harper (disambiguation)
