= Tom Glaze =

American judge (1938–2012)

Thomas Arthur Glaze (January 14, 1938 – March 30, 2012) was an American lawyer. He served as a justice of the Arkansas Supreme Court from 1987 to 2008.

== Early life and family ==
Glaze was born on January 14, 1938, in Joplin, Missouri. He was the son of Harry "Slick" Glaze, a sheet-metal worker, and Mamie Rose Guetterman Glaze, who worked on an airplane-parts assembly line. He was an active participant in sports and played baseball for the University of Arkansas in Fayetteville. He received his law degree from the University of Arkansas School of Law, and gained admission to the bar in 1964.

== Career ==
After law school in 1964, Glaze began his career with the Election Research Council (ERC), an organization funded by Republican Winthrop Rockefeller, focusing on election fraud. As deputy Attorney General of Arkansas in 1969, he attempted to overhaul the state's election laws, but his proposals underwent significant modifications by the Arkansas General Assembly. He later founded The Election Laws Institute to monitor elections and address fraudulent activities, particularly in counties such as Conway County and Searcy County known for voting irregularities.

By 1978, Glaze had been appointed as a chancery judge in Pulaski County.

In 1980, he joined the Arkansas Court of Appeals and by 1986, he became a justice of the Arkansas Supreme Court, a position he held for twenty-two years before retiring in 2008 due to Parkinson's disease. While on the bench, Glaze was involved in various decisions, some of which pertained to non-discrimination and public education financing.

== Personal life and death ==
Glaze married Susan Askins, with whom he had four children. The couple divorced in 1974, and in 1978, he married Phyllis Laser. Glaze authored a memoir titled Waiting for the Cemetery Vote, which highlighted his experiences confronting election fraud. He died on March 30, 2012, and was buried in Mount Holly Cemetery in Little Rock.

== Bibliography ==
- Waiting for the Cemetery Vote

Political offices
Preceded by George Rose Smith	Justice of the Arkansas Supreme Court; 1987–2008	Succeeded by Elana Wills
