= Walton Watkins =

American civil war officer

Walton Watkins (died 1884) was an officer during the American Civil War and an official in the Arkansas Senate.

George C. Watkins, Arkansas Attorney General and Chief Justice of the Arkansas Supreme Court, was his father and Mary Crease Watkins his mother. His brother Anderson Watkins was killed in the Battle of Atlanta during the Civil War and his brother Claibourne Watkins was an officer in the war, a doctor, and a medical school co-founder.

He served in Hawthorne's Infantry Regiment. He was captured and held prisoner. He served as Assistant Secretary of the Arkansas Senate.
