= Charles C. Wine =

American judge (1901–1974)

Charles C. Wine (May 17, 1901 – February 9, 1974) was an Arkansas lawyer who served as Arkansas Public Service Commissioner from 1945 to 1950, and as a justice of the Arkansas Supreme Court for several months in 1948.

He was born near Carthage, Missouri, but he grew up in Texarkana. He got a degree from the University of Arkansas. He received a law degree from the Cumberland School of Law before beginning his career as a judge in Texarkana in 1936.

He was also the Arkansas Public Service Commissioner from 1945 to 1950. In August 1948, Wine was appointed to a seat on the state supreme court vacated by the death of Justice Edgar L. McHaney, to serve until a new justice was elected in the November 1948 election. Wine sought election to the court in 1950, but lost in the primary to Sam Dunn Robinson.

Wine died in a hospital in Bentonville, Arkansas, at the age of 72.

Political offices
Preceded by Edgar L. McHaney	Justice of the Arkansas Supreme Court; 1948–1948	Succeeded by George Rose Smith
