= Lafayette Gregg =

American judge

Honorable Lafayette Gregg

Associate Justice of the Arkansas Supreme Court
- In office 1868–1874
- Preceded by: Freeman W. Compton
- Succeeded by: David Walker

Chancery Judge of the 1st District
- In office November 25, 1865 – February 12, 1867
- Preceded by: U.M. Rose
- Succeeded by: Thomas D. W. Yonley
- Constituency: Pulaski County

Member of the Arkansas House of Representatives from the Washington County district
- In office November 6, 1854 – November 3, 1856 Serving with S.R. Mouldin, B.H. Smithson, Thomas Wilson
- Preceded by: G. Cline
- Succeeded by: John Billingsley

Personal details
- Born: February 6, 1825 Moulton, Alabama, U.S.
- Died: November 1, 1891 (aged 66) Fayetteville, Arkansas, U.S.
- Resting place: Evergreen Cemetery
- Party: Republican
- Spouse: Mary Ann Shreve (m. 1852–1891)
- Children: 6 [ Alice, Alfred, Andrew, Lafayette W, Henry, Ida]
- Profession: Lawyer, banker

Military service
- Allegiance: United States
- Years of service: 1864-1865
- Rank: Colonel
- Unit: 4th Arkansas Cavalry
- Battles/wars: Civil War

Lafayette S. Gregg (February 6, 1825 – November 1, 1891) was a lawyer and politician from Fayetteville, Arkansas. An ardent Republican and Unionist, he represented the interests of Fayetteville and the northwest Arkansas region in the Arkansas House of Representatives and through judicial positions, including serving as Associate Justice of the Arkansas Supreme Court from 1868 to 1874.

Gregg served for the Union in the Civil War and held many prominent positions, but is perhaps best known for his efforts to locate the University of Arkansas in Fayetteville. He remained closely associated with the university and city throughout the last 20 years of his life, and served as an influential advocate.

== Early life and career ==
Lafayette S. Gregg was born February 6, 1825, in Moulton, Alabama. He was the son of Henry Gragg and Mary Murrell. The family moved to Arkansas Territory in 1835.

After growing up on a Washington County, Arkansas farm, Gregg began reading law in W.D. Reagan's Fayetteville, Arkansas law office in 1849. He taught school to support himself until passing the bar exam and establishing a law practice, ultimately rising to become a prominent attorney in town. Gregg married Mary A. Shreve 21 December 1852, in Washington County, Arkansas.

Gregg won election to represent Washington County in the Arkansas House of Representatives during the Tenth Arkansas General Assembly alongside three other representatives. Gregg was later elected prosecuting attorney for the Fourth Circuit (Washington County) on August 23, 1856.

== Civil War ==
Gregg was a lifelong Republican who opposed Arkansas's secession from the United States and maintained loyalty to the United States during the Civil War. Though his position was not uncommon in the northwestern part of Arkansas, much of Arkansas supported secession and joining the Confederate States of America.

During the Civil War, Colonel Lafayette S. Gregg was in charge of Company S, 4th Arkansas Cavalry Regiment from 16 October 1864, until 30 June 1865.

== Post-war career ==
He was elected Chancellor of the Pulaski Chancery Court on November 25, 1865, and later an associate justice of the Arkansas Supreme Court. Gregg worked with fellow Fayetteville booster David Walker to ensure the Arkansas Industrial University (now known as the University of Arkansas) would be established in Fayetteville. Walker was an ardent Confederate and the two men's combination proved consequential to the city's bid for the university.

He was drafted by the Republicans to oppose incumbent Governor Simon P. Hughes in the 1886 Arkansas gubernatorial election. Gregg was soundly defeated, which was typical of Republican candidates during the Solid South period that followed the Reconstruction era.

Following the Arkansas Industrial University's founding in 1871, Gregg was elected to the board of trustees and served on the buildings committee. He personally oversaw construction of University Hall, now known as Old Main. Gregg simultaneously undertook construction of a large brick residence with similar styling two blocks away, now known as the Gregg House. He served as a professor of constitutional law following creation of the law department in 1890.

Gregg also founded and served as president of the Bank of Fayetteville, managed a 400 acres (160 ha) farm, practiced law, and served as a state and local booster during the final years of his life. Gregg donated land to the American Missionary Association for a school for Black children and advocated for Arkansas's inclusion in the Columbian Exposition. He served as chair of the Arkansas Banking Association in 1891. Gregg died at home on November 1, 1891; courts, businesses, banks, and the university all closed on the day of Gregg's funeral. He is buried in nearby Evergreen Cemetery with several other influential Fayetteville residents.

Party political offices
Preceded by Thomas Boles	Republican nominee for Governor of Arkansas; 1886	Vacant Title next held by W. G. Whipple
Political offices
Preceded by Freeman W. Compton	Justice of the Arkansas Supreme Court; 1868–1874	Succeeded by David Walker
