= Burrill B. Battle =

American judge (1838–1917)

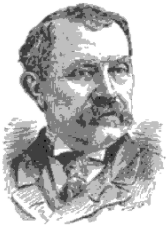

Justice of the Arkansas Supreme Court
- In office 1885–1910

Member of the Arkansas House of Representatives
- In office 1871

Personal details
- Born: Burrill Bunn Battle; October 24, 1838 Hinds County, Mississippi
- Died: December 21, 1917 (aged 79) Little Rock, Arkansas
- Spouse: Josephine A. Witherspoon (m. 1871; died 1899)
- Education: Arkansas College; Cumberland University
- Occupation: Politician, jurist

Burrill Bunn Battle (October 24, 1838 – December 21, 1917) was a justice of the Arkansas Supreme Court from 1885 to 1910.

== Early life, education, and military service ==
Born in Hinds County, Mississippi, Battle's father was Judge Joseph J. Battle of Raleigh, North Carolina, who emigrated to Arkansas in 1844. Battle received a B.A. from Arkansas College in 1856, and an LL.B. from the Law Department of Cumberland University of Lebanon, Tennessee in 1858. Returning to Arkansas, he entered the practice at Lewisville, in Lafayette County. At the outbreak of the American Civil War, he enlisted as a private in the artillery of the Confederate States Army, where he "serve under Gens. Cheatham and Cleburne", and "participated in all the great battles of the Army of Tennessee", including "the battles of Shiloh, Perryville, Murfreesboro, Chickamauga, Missionary Ridge, and others".

== Legal and political career ==
After the war, Battle resumed the practice of the law at Lewisville, moving to Washington, in Hempstead County, in 1869. He served in the Arkansas House of Representatives in 1871. In 1880, he moved to Little Rock, where he formed a partnership with Judge Freeman W. Compton. This continued until 1885, when Battle was elected Associate Justice of the Arkansas Supreme Court, to fill the vacancy caused by the death of Judge John R. Eakin. Battle was continually re-elected until his voluntary retirement in 1911, at the expiration of his fourth term. After his retirement, he continued to reside in Little Rock until his death. Battle was described as quiet and reserved, and having disliked the turmoil of the trial courts. He was considered to be conservative as a justice.

== Personal life ==
In his private life, Battle was "a leading member of the Baptist Church". He married Mrs. Josephine A. Witherspoon, née Cannon on November 29, 1871. She died in 1899. They had no children.

Burrill B. Battle died at his home in Little Rock on December 21, 1917.

Political offices
Preceded by John R. Eakin	Justice of the Arkansas Supreme Court; 1885–1910	Succeeded by William F. Kirby
