= Senator Knox (disambiguation) =

Philander C. Knox (1853–1921) was a U.S. Senator from Pennsylvania from 1917 to 1921. Senator Knox may also refer to:

- Eddie Knox (1937–2026), North Carolina State Senate
- Forrest Knox (born 1956), Kansas State Senate
- Izaah Knox (born 1977), Iowa State Senate
- Robert C. Knox (1892–1947), Arkansas State Senate
