= Thomas J. Lacy =

American judge (1806–1849)

Thomas J. Lacy (c. 1806 – January 11, 1849) was a justice of the Arkansas Supreme Court, serving as one of the first three members of the court from 1836 to 1845.

Born in Rockingham County, North Carolina, Lacy was a graduate of Chapel Hill College, according to some sources, "graduating at the top of his class in 1825". He then read law under John Pope in Springfield, Kentucky. Pope was "an ally of Andrew Jackson who would later serve as territorial governor in Arkansas", an important connection for Lacy.

In 1834, President Jackson appointed Lacy to a seat on the Superior Court of the Arkansas Territory, the highest court in the territory. Lacy served with Townsend Dickinson in the constitutional convention of 1836 and was elected one of the first judges of the state supreme court. In 1842, Lacy wrote a decision in a case that sparked political controversy, described as follows:

On April 2nd of that year, the Real Estate Bank, a corporation under the patronage of the state and one of the numerous fiascos of that age of wildcat banking, was compelled to make an assignment. The consternation throughout the state was unbounded. The assignment was attacked, but was sustained by Judge Lacy in an extended and able opinion, concurred in by Judge Dickinson (Conway, ex parte, 4 Ark., 361). The chief justice dissented. From every quarter there went up a cry of indignation, and a demand for the impeachment of the two judges. When the legislature met many of the members were bent upon impeachment, but Mr. Pike, who had drawn the assignment, thwarted them in an adroit way. He had sent copies of the assignment to Judge Story and to Chancellor Kent, and both had replied that the instrument was entirely valid. Copies of their opinions were laid upon the desk of each legislator, and nothing more was heard of the impeachment. The opinion in this case is a very able one, and had great weight in establishing the doctrine that an insolvent corporation may make an assignment with preferences.

On the expiration of his first official term he was re-elected without opposition, but in 1845, was compelled, by failing health, to resign. In search of a more congenial climate, he went to New Orleans, where he died of cholera at the age of 43.

Political offices
Preceded by Newly created seat	Justice of the Arkansas Supreme Court; 1836–1845	Succeeded by Edward Cross
