= Dale Price =

American judge (1924–1997)

Norman Dale Price (February 26, 1924 – December 7, 1997) was a justice of the Arkansas Supreme Court in 1990.

Born in Berryville, Arkansas, Price received his undergraduate degree from the University of Arkansas, followed by a law degree from the University of Arkansas School of Law. He gained admission to the bar in 1951, and commenced the practice of law, serving for various periods as president of the Arkansas Trial Lawyers Association, as a member of the board of governors of the American Trial Lawyers Association, and on the state supreme court's ethics committee.

In February 1990, Governor Bill Clinton appointed Price, then 65, to a seat on the Arkansas Supreme Court vacated by the resignation of Darrell Hickman, for the remainder of Hickman's term, which expired later that year.

Political offices
Preceded by Darrell Hickman	Justice of the Arkansas Supreme Court; 1990–1990	Succeeded by Robert L. Brown
