= George Rose Smith =

American judge (1911–1992)

George Rose Smith (July 26, 1911 – October 20, 1992) was a justice of the Arkansas Supreme Court from 1949 to 1987. He held the longest tenure of any Arkansas Supreme Court Justice.

Smith was born in Little Rock, Arkansas, the son of Jessie Rose Smith and Presbyterian minister Hay Watson Smith. He was valedictorian of his class at Little Rock High School in 1928. He briefly attended Washington and Lee University in Lexington, Virginia, but graduated from the University of Arkansas School of Law, again as valedictorian of his class, 1933. He gained admission to the bar in Arkansas that same year. He joined what would later become the Rose Law Firm.

Smith served in the military during World War II. After returning he wrote an article criticizing the current Justices of the Arkansas Supreme Court for their mistakes in legal research and opinion writing. The article made waves and helped launch his judicial career.

Smith was elected an Associate Justice in 1949 and served until his retirement in 1986. He developed the Arkansas Supreme Court's system for submitting cases.

Political offices
Preceded by Charles C. Wine	Justice of the Arkansas Supreme Court; 1949–1987	Succeeded by Tom Glaze
