= T. H. Humphreys =

American politician

Member of the Arkansas House of Representatives
- In office 1899–1903

Speaker of the Arkansas House of Representatives
- In office 1901–1903
- Preceded by: A. F. Vandeventer
- Succeeded by: John Isaac Moore

Personal details
- Born: September 20, 1865 Arkansas, United States
- Died: November 5, 1951 (aged 86) Evergreen, Arkansas
- Party: Democratic

Thomas Hadden Humphreys (September 20, 1865 – November 7, 1951) was an American politician. He was a member of the Arkansas House of Representatives, serving from 1899 to 1903, serving as speaker of the House for the 1901 session, and a justice of the Arkansas Supreme Court from 1916 to 1942. He was a member of the Democratic party.

In 1890, Humphreys married Beulah C. Botefuhr of Fayetteville, with whom he had three sons.

Political offices
Preceded by William F. Kirby	Justice of the Arkansas Supreme Court; 1916–1942	Succeeded by R. W. Robins
