= Justice Hayes =

Justice Hayes may refer to:

- Charles R. Hayes (1899–1968), associate justice of the South Dakota Supreme Court
- Thomas L. Hayes (1926–1987), associate justice of the Vermont Supreme Court

== See also ==
- Justice Hays (disambiguation)
- Judge Hayes (disambiguation)
