= Tom Miller Mehaffy =

American judge

Thomas Miller Mehaffy (October 1859 – October 20, 1944) was a justice of the Arkansas Supreme Court from 1927 to 1942. He was initially appointed to the court, and subsequently elected.

He served a mayor of Benton, Arkansas and served as a member of the Arkansas House of Representatives and Arkansas Senate. Around 1900 he moved to Little Rock.

Born in Ripley, Mississippi, Mehaffy's son James was elected to a newly created seventh seat on the court in 1926, for an eight-year term beginning in 1927, but was killed in a car accident before assuming office. Following his son's death, Mehaffy was named to the seat to which the son had been elected.

He was reelected to an additional eight-year term in 1934, retiring from the court at the end of this term in 1942, after sixteen years of service.

Mehaffy died at his home in Little Rock, Arkansas, having turned 85 earlier that month, and having been bedridden with an illness for several weeks preceding his death. He was survived by his wife, three sons, and three daughters.

Political offices
Preceded by James W. Mehaffy	Justice of the Arkansas Supreme Court; 1927–1942	Succeeded by Ed F. McFaddin
