= Turner Butler =

American judge (1869–1938)

Turner Butler (July 7, 1869 – January 19, 1938) was a politician and judge who served as justice of the Arkansas Supreme Court from 1929 to 1938.

Born in Poplar Bluff, Missouri, Butler became a farmer and store clerk before studying law. In 1894 and 1896 he was elected to the Arkansas House of Representatives. He was elected to the Arkansas Senate in 1898.

In 1914 he was elected to be a Circuit Judge for the Tenth Judicial Circuit where he served until 1929. In 1929, Butler was appointed to a seat on the state supreme court vacated by the retirement of Justice Carroll D. Wood. and served thereafter until his death.

Political offices
Preceded by Carroll D. Wood	Justice of the Arkansas Supreme Court; 1929–1938	Succeeded by William R. Donham
