= Judge Knox =

Judge Knox may refer to:

- George Edward Knox (1845–1922), British Indian judge who worked in the high court of Allahabad
- John C. Knox (New York judge) (1881–1966), judge of the United States District Court for the Southern District of New York
- William W. Knox (1911–1981), judge of the United States District Court for the Western District of Pennsylvania

== See also ==
- Justice Knox (disambiguation)
