= Richard B. Adkisson =

American judge

Richard Blanks Adkisson (October 12, 1932 – May 18, 2011) was chief justice of the Arkansas Supreme Court from 1980 to 1984.

Born in Faulkner County, Arkansas, Adkisson attended various public schools in the region, and then joined the United States Air Force, serving from January 1951 to July 1954. He then received a B.A. from the University of Arkansas in 1957, and a J.D. from the same institution in 1959. After working in private practice for a time, Adkisson was chief assistant attorney general of Arkansas from 1963 to 1966, and then a prosecuting attorney for the Sixth Judicial Circuit in Little Rock, Arkansas, from 1967 to 1970. In 1970, Adkisson was elected as a judge of the Pulaski County Circuit Court, to which he was reelected in 1974 and 1978.

In 1980, Adkisson was elected chief justice of the Arkansas Supreme Court, to fill the remaining four years of the term to which retiring chief justice John A. Fogleman had been elected. but did not run for reelection in 1984, instead resigning before the end of his term. At the time of his resignation, it was reported that he faced health problems. Adkisson indicated that he did not intend to return to the private practice of law, but eventually did so.

Adkisson died of cancer in Little Rock, Arkansas, at the age of 78.

Political offices
Preceded by John A. Fogleman	Justice of the Arkansas Supreme Court; 1980–1984	Succeeded by Webster Hubbell
