= R. W. Robins =

American judge (1883–1949)

Reuben William Robins (May 21, 1883 – June 30, 1949) was an American lawyer and banker who served as a justice of the Arkansas Supreme Court from 1943 until his death in 1949.

== Early life and education ==
Born in Conway, Arkansas, Robins was the second son of J. W. and Minnie Freeman Robins, farmers who had moved from Shelby County, Tennessee, to Conway in 1880. After his father's death in 1895, his mother served as guardian of Robins and his siblings, and in 1899, she remarried to John W. Underhill, a Conway newspaper publisher. Underhill controlled the Conway Log Cabin, a predecessor of the Log Cabin Democrat, and when Underhill died in 1906, Francis E. "Frank" Robins, the older brother of R. W. Robins, became editor of the newspaper, later purchasing the publishing plant.

Robins attended Conway public schools and entered Hendrix College in 1896 at the age of thirteen, as the college's youngest student. After two years at Hendrix, he studied at a law school in Little Rock sponsored by the Arkansas Industrial University, as the University of Arkansas was then known, and also studied law under Samuel Frauenthal in Conway, later becoming Frauenthal's law partner.

== Legal and banking career ==
Robins subsequently became a longtime law partner of George W. Clark, and practiced law for 37 years. He developed a substantial trial practice, frequently including representation of workers in personal injury cases. In one such case, Missouri Pacific Railroad Co. v. Montgomery (1932), he represented a railroad brakeman who had been injured when a freight train stopped abruptly. The Arkansas Supreme Court affirmed a $12,500 judgment (approximately $295,000 in 2025) in the brakeman's favor.

Robins and his brother Frank were active in Democratic Party politics. Robins served on county and state Democratic central committees, and was a delegate to the 1932 Democratic National Convention and the 1936 Democratic National Convention. However, he did not seek elective office himself until his candidacy for the Arkansas Supreme Court, in 1942.

After a series of bank failures left Faulkner County, Arkansas, without a bank in the early 1930s, Robins helped organize the First National Bank of Conway, serving as its first president for six years while continuing his law practice.

== Judicial service ==
On February 25, 1942, Robins declared his candidacy for the Democratic nomination for a seat as an associate justice of the Arkansas Supreme Court. He won a close race for the nomination against Robert A. Leflar, then a professor at the University of Arkansas School of Law and later its dean. Robins was elected that November, taking office on January 1, 1943, for an eight-year term.

Robins wrote for the three dissenting justices in the case of Dotson v. Ritchie (1947), a 4–3 decision concerning disputed absentee ballots in a closely contested election for sheriff of Madison County. In his opinion, Robins maintained that election commissioners had acted within their authority in determining that disputed ballots were invalid and should not be counted. Robins was also the lone dissenter in Cole and Jones v. State (1949), a case arising from a 1945 strike at the Southern Cotton Oil Mill in Little Rock. The majority affirmed the convictions of two union members under an Arkansas statute prohibiting the promotion, encouragement, or assistance of an unlawful assemblage involving force or violence; Robins dissented without a written opinion.

Although seriously ill during the final year of his life, Robins continued working from his home, writing one to three opinions per week, with his secretary carrying briefs and other court materials between his home and the court's offices in the state capitol. After the death of Robins in 1949, Governor Sid McMath appointed Leflar to the vacant supreme court seat for the remainder of the term.

== Personal life and death ==
On July 31, 1909, Robins married Beatrice Powell, of Milan, Tennessee, who had previously taught at the Arkansas State Normal School in Conway. They had two daughters.

He died at St. Vincent's Infirmary in Little Rock, after a prolonged illness involving his heart and kidneys, at the age of 66. He was buried at Oak Grove Cemetery in Conway.

In 1928, Robins had a Mission Revival house built in Conway, where he lived for the rest of his life. The house was listed on the National Register of Historic Places in 2005, as the Reuben W. Robins House.

Political offices
Preceded by T. H. Humphreys	Justice of the Arkansas Supreme Court; 1943–1949	Succeeded by Robert A. Leflar
