= Nelson Hackett =

Nelson Hackett (Note: Hackett's surname is spelled Hacket in some sources.) (born c. 1810) was a enslaved man who was extradited to the United States after having fled to Canada.

In 1841, he escaped from his Arkansas owner, Alfred Wallace of Fayetteville. Using a stolen horse, six weeks later he crossed the border and entered Canada West (Note: Upper Canada had been re-named Canada West after uniting with Lower Canada to form the Province of Canada in February 1841.) (present-day Ontario) near what today is Windsor.

== Extradition ==
Despite slavery having been abolished throughout the British Empire in 1834, Wallace refused to let the matter drop. He was one of the wealthiest men in Arkansas and was well connected, particularly to the Governor of Arkansas, Archibald Yell. He wrote to the colonial governor in Canada, who ordered Hackett's arrest. Hackett was detained in Chatham.

Wallace and an associate, George C. Grigg, traveled to Canada and made out sworn dispositions against Hackett for stealing the horse, and a gold watch belonging to Wallace. Despite opposition from prominent Canadian politicians including William Henry Draper, Hackett was extradited to the United States on the order of Governor General Sir Charles Bagot, who cited the alleged theft of the watch, which exceeded what was necessary to facilitate his escape to freedom, to justify his decision.

Public reaction from abolitionists in England, Canada, and the northern United States was strong. Politicians in the British House of Commons and the Canadian Parliament questioned the motives for the extradition and its legality.

Research indicates Hackett was returned to Fayetteville in the summer of 1842. He was not put to death for the alleged theft (a fate frequently suffered by enslaved people under similar circumstances) but was publicly whipped several times and tortured. Researchers have said he was sold to a new owner in Texas, from where he escaped again. Hackett's fate remains unknown.

=== Wallace's motives ===
Wallace's legal bills, travel costs, and related expenses were likely several times Hackett's market value, leading to debate regarding his motive(s) in going to such extraordinary measures to recover an escaped enslaved person:

- Wallace may have believed the effort necessary to restore his honor, which Hackett's status as a domestic servant (as opposed to a mere common laborer) and his horse theft would have particularly aggrieved. Furthermore, it is uncertain whether the horse Hackett used to escape was Wallace's. (Note: Southern law of the era held enslavers responsible (at least in civil court) for the conduct of the people they enslaved, including those that escaped. For example, if an escaping enslaved man stole a horse other than his enslaver's, the enslaver would have been expected to compensate the horse's owner.)
- Wallace was intent on "teaching a lesson" to enslaved Americans (or, at least, wanted to deter his other slaves) by demonstrating that Canada would not be a haven for them.
- Wallace may have had political ambitions and perhaps hoped to portray his actions as a "selfless" endeavor to defend the "rights" of all American slave-owners.

In any event, while successful in its immediate objective, Wallace's mission soon proved highly detrimental to U.S. slave-owners' interests. Hackett's escape brought more attention to Canada as a refuge for enslaved people. When the extradition clause of the Webster–Ashburton Treaty was finally negotiated, enslaved people were protected from extradition to their former American owners. Hackett was the last escaped enslaved person extradited from Canada before the U.S. abolished chattel slavery in 1865.

== Legacy ==
In 2022, Fayetteville, Arkansas renamed Archibald Yell Boulevard to Nelson Hackett Boulevard.

In June 2023, a historical marker honoring Hackett was unveiled in Fayetteville, Arkansas.

A mural along Nelson Hackett Boulevard, named "Remembrance" by its artist Joëlle Storet, depicts some important black Fayetteville residents, including Hackett.
