= Justice Eakin =

Justice Eakin may refer to:

- John R. Eakin (1822–1885), associate justice of the Arkansas Supreme Court
- Michael Eakin (born 1948), associate justice of the Supreme Court of Pennsylvania
- Robert Eakin (1848–1917), chief justice of the Oregon Supreme Court

== See also ==
- Michael J. Eagen (1907–1987), chief justice of the Supreme Court of Pennsylvania
