= Judge Harper =

Judge Harper may refer to:

- Roy Winfield Harper (1905–1994), judge of the United States District Courts for the Eastern and Western Districts of Missouri
- Samuel Hadden Harper (1783–1837), judge of the United States District Courts for the Eastern and Western Districts of Louisiana

== See also ==
- Justice Harper (disambiguation)
