= Judge Hayes =

Judge Hayes may refer to:

- Johnson Jay Hayes (1886–1970), judge of the United States District Court for the Middle District of North Carolina
- William Q. Hayes (born 1956), judge of the United States District Court for the Southern District of California

== See also ==
- Judge Hays (disambiguation)
- Justice Hayes (disambiguation)
