= 75th Illinois Infantry Regiment =

75th Regiment Illinois Volunteer Infantry
- Illinois state flag
- Active: September 2, 1862, to June 12, 1865
- Country: United States
- Allegiance: Union
- Branch: Infantry
- Engagements: (Perryville)Battle of Stone's River; Siege of Chattanooga; Battle of Kennesaw Mountain; Battle of Jonesboro; Battle of Franklin; Battle of Nashville

The 75th Regiment Illinois Volunteer Infantry was an infantry regiment that served in the Union Army during the American Civil War.

== Service ==
75th Regiment Illinois was organized at Dixon, Illinois and mustered into Federal service on September 2, 1862.

The regiment was discharged from service on June 12, 1865.

== Total strength and casualties ==
The regiment lost 3 officers and 94 enlisted men killed in action or died of wounds and 5 officers and 103 enlisted men who died of disease, for a total of 205 fatalities.

== Commanders ==
- Colonel George Ryan - Resigned December 20, 1862.
- Colonel John E. Bennett - Mustered out with the regiment.

== See also ==
- List of Illinois Civil War Units
- Illinois in the American Civil War
