= Reuben W. Robins House =

Historic house in Arkansas, United States

- U.S. National Register of Historic Places
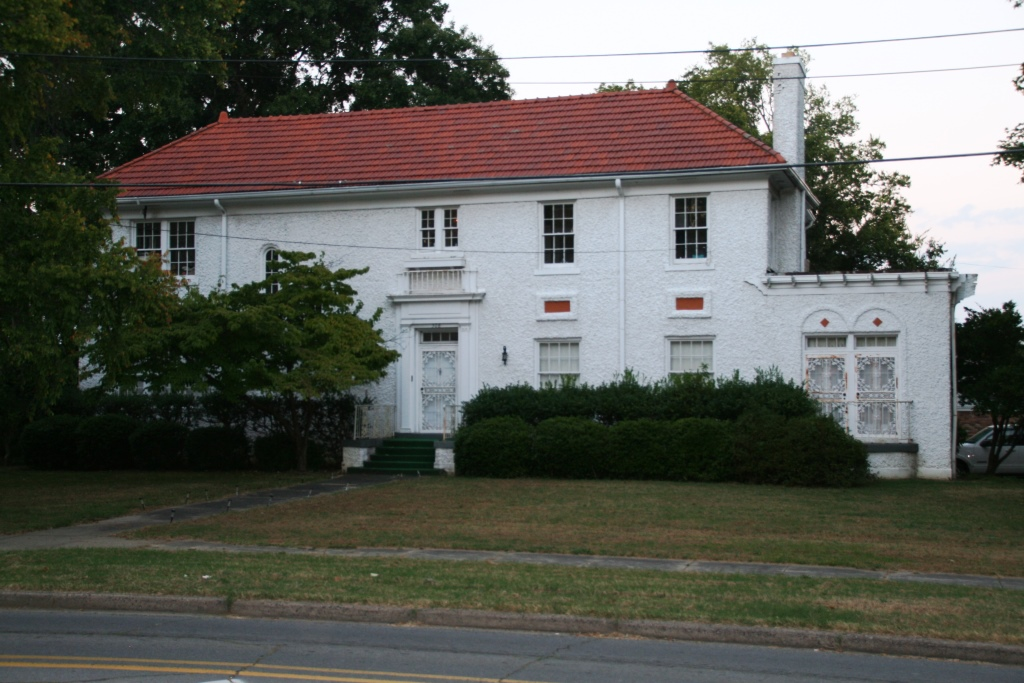

- Location within Arkansas Location within the United States
- Location: 508 Locust St., Conway, Arkansas
- Coordinates: 35°5′14″N 92°26′26″W
- Area: less than one acre
- Built: 1928
- Architectural style: Mission/spanish Revival
- NRHP reference No.: 05001072
- Added to NRHP: September 28, 2005

The Reuben W. Robins House is a historic house at 508 Locust Street in Conway, Arkansas. Built in 1928, it is a fine local example of Mission Revival architecture. It is two stories in height, with a hipped red tile roof and a stuccoed exterior. Most of its windows are rectangular sash, but there are a few round-arch windows in the Mission style. The house was built for Reuben W. Robins, a prominent local attorney who also served on the Arkansas Supreme Court.

The house was listed on the National Register of Historic Places in 2005.

== See also ==
- National Register of Historic Places listings in Faulkner County, Arkansas
