= Jack Holt Jr. =

American judge (1929–2023)

Jack Wilson Holt Jr. (May 18, 1929 – March 5, 2023) was an American attorney and judge who served as a justice of the Arkansas Supreme Court from 1969 to 1983, and as chief justice from 1985 to 1995.

== Early life, education, military service, and career ==
Born in Harrison, Arkansas, Holt graduated from the University of Arkansas School of Law in 1952. He spent three years serving stateside in the United States Air Force during the Korean War. In 1955, Holt became a Deputy Prosecutor for the Sixth Judicial Circuit until becoming Chief Assistant Attorney General in 1960. Holt was appointed to be Arkansas Attorney General in 1962, the seat having been vacated by Holt's uncle, J. Frank Holt, accepting an appointment to the state supreme court. In 1963, he went into private practice in Little Rock, Arkansas.

In 1969, at the request of United States District Judge J. Smith Henley, Holt helped represent inmates in the case of Holt v. Sarver II, in which a federal court held that conditions in the Arkansas state prison system violated the Eighth Amendment to the United States Constitution. The ruling was upheld on appeal, and led to extended federal oversight and influenced prison reform litigation in other states.

Holt remained an Air Force reservist until 1979, achieving the rank of colonel.

== Judicial service and later life ==
Holt was elected as a Democrat to be Chief Justice of the Arkansas Supreme Court in 1984 where he served until he retired in 1995. Among his duties on the court was swearing in Bill Clinton as Governor of Arkansas, Clinton's third time winning the office, in 1986. At the ceremony Clinton thanked Holt for helping to find a job for Clinton that enabled him to work his way through college. After leaving the Court, he volunteered and contracted with the Arkansas Game and Fish Commission (AGFC) to serve as that body's administrative hearing officer from 1998 to 2010. He also successfully campaigned for Amendment 80 to the Arkansas Constitution, passed in 2000, which reformed and reorganized Arkansas's judicial system into its modern form.

Holt died at his home near Little Rock, Arkansas, at the age of 93. The AGFC held a moment of silence for him.

== See also ==
- Ernest Dumas, Interview with Justice John Stroud, Little Rock, Arkansas, November 7th, 2013, Arkansas Supreme Court Historical Society, discussing Stroud's long friendship with Holt

Political offices
Preceded by J. Frank Holt	Arkansas Attorney General (acting); 1962–1963	Succeeded by Bruce Bennett
Preceded by Neill Bohlinger	Justice of the Arkansas Supreme Court; 1969–1983	Succeeded by Hugh M. Bland
Preceded by Webster Hubbell	Chief Justice of the Arkansas Supreme Court; 1985–1995	Succeeded by Bradley D. Jesson
