= Basil Baker =

Justice of the Supreme Court of Arkansas (1871–1941)

Basil Baker (January 29, 1871 – September 20, 1941) was a justice of the Supreme Court of Arkansas from 1934 to 1941.

== Early life and education ==
Born in Columbia County, Arkansas. His parents were farmer Joshua D. Baker and Bethia T. Jameson and they ran a store.

Baker attended country schools and J.H Davis's Select Male School in his home county before graduating and moving on to college. In 1895 he graduated from Ouachita Baptist College (currently Ouachita Baptist University) in Arkadelphia. Upon his move to Craighead County, he became a teacher soon after, and also taught himself law. Baker came into each week ready to learn.

== Career ==
In 1895, the bar admitted Baker and he was the city attorney in Jonesboro, Arkansas, in 1903–1904. In 1918 he served as the City Water and Light (CWL)'s attorney. While at CWL, the company withstood takeover attempts by Arkansas Power and Light (AP&L) which sought to take their home base. He then ran for state senate but failed due to the local Ku Klux Klan's opposition against the CWL.

Baker ran against incumbent William F. Kirby in the Arkansas Supreme Court race in 1934. Kirby died on July 26, 1934, before the race began. Baker then filled out the rest of Kirby's term.(on September 15, 1934) Baker went on to run in an uncontested race in November 1934.

In 1934, Baker made his first ever opinion in the Fort Smith Gas Company v. Wiseman (1934) case. Baker's ruling reversed an earlier one which nullified the Corporation Commission's fee support fact finding Tribunal.

In Cherry v. Leonard (1934) he upheld legislation which comprised the bondholders' debts of the state's highways. Later that year, in Fries v. Phillips (1934) Baker called against trying cases 'de novo'.

A year later, Baker presided over Prather v. State (1935) Baker used legal realism in an appeal case involving defendants convicted of possessing certain tools a felony as legal realism was a hallmark of the 1930s.

Baker showed some judicial humor in cases like Pope v. Oliver (1938) where he called for trolls to be removed from state bridges so the federal highway's $5 million price tag could be given to the state. In 1939, Baker presided over Missouri Pac. Trans. Co vs George which was an accident case. In that case, Baker cited a previously deceased justice in his statement and cited an older case (Hynson v. Terry 1 Ark 1838) which were typical for his opinions at the time. Baker's law partners included United States Senator Thaddeus Caraway who also was husband of senator Hattie Caraway. Baker helped Hattie out in her race against Frank Pace.

== Personal life ==
Baker was married to Mary Elizabeth Kinsworthy whom he married on October 14, 1897. The couple were married for 19 years before Mary died and Baker then remarried Audly Matthewson States on Christmas in 1918. Baker spent time on his Ashley County farm as an adult. Baker was diagnosed with heart disease in October 1940. In July 1941, he returned for a ceremony while in a wheel chair. After he got pneumonia, he died on September 20, 1941. He wasn't yet formally retired when he died. He is buried in Jonesboro, Arkansas at Oaklawn Cemetery.

Political offices
Preceded by William F. Kirby	Justice of the Arkansas Supreme Court; 1934–1941	Succeeded by Karl Greenhaw
