= Sam Dunn Robinson =

American judge (1899–1997)

Sam Dunn Robinson (March 21, 1899 – June 7, 1997) was a justice on the Arkansas Supreme Court from 1951 to 1965.

Robinson was born in Chicot County, Arkansas. He joined the United States Army at the age 18 to serve in World War I.

After the war, he returned to Arkansas and did agricultural work including herding cattle. In 1923, Robinson began studying at the Arkansas Law School. He graduated at the top of his class even though he had not received formal education beyond the third grade. He worked as a lawyer for the next 16 years.

Robinson was elected as a Prosecuting Attorney for the Sixth Judicial Circuit in 1940. He was elected an Associate Justice in 1950. He served as an Associate Justice until he retired in 1966.

Robinson died in Little Rock, Arkansas, at the age of 98.

Political offices
Preceded by Robert A. Leflar	Justice of the Arkansas Supreme Court; 1951–1965	Succeeded by Osro Cobb
