= Sterling R. Cockrill (judge) =

American judge (1847–1901)

The Honorable Sterling Robertson Cockrill
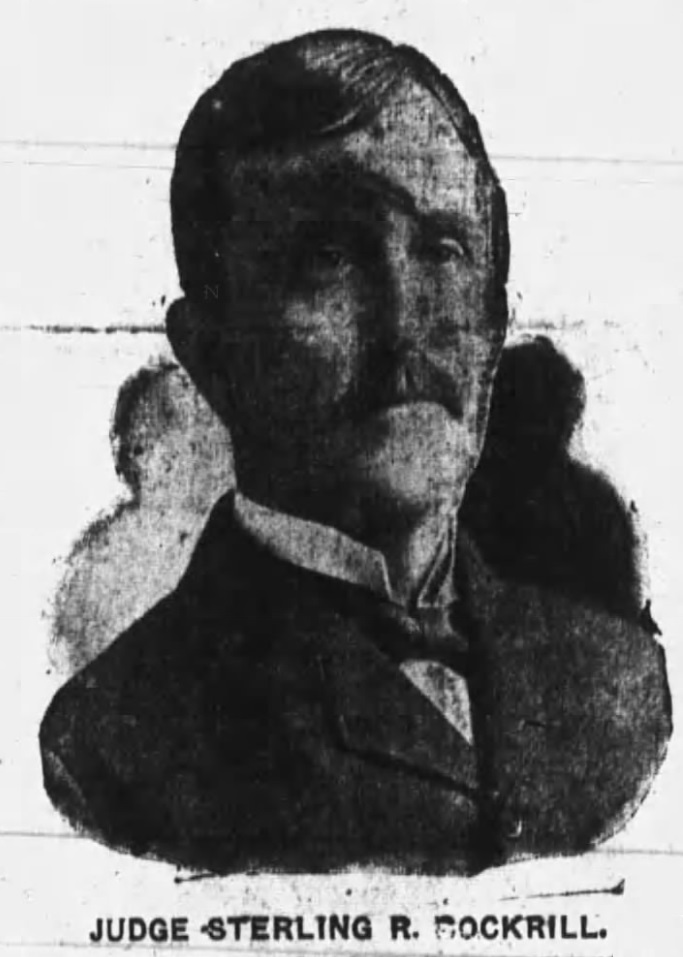

Chief Justice of the Arkansas Supreme Court
- In office 1884–1893
- Preceded by: Elbert H. English
- Succeeded by: Henry G. Bunn

Personal details
- Born: September 26, 1847 Nashville, Tennessee, U.S.
- Died: January 12, 1901 (aged 53) Little Rock, Arkansas, U.S.
- Spouse: Mary Ashley Freeman
- Children: 6
- Education: Washington & Lee University, Cumberland University Law School

Sterling Robertson Cockrill (September 26, 1847 – January 12, 1901) was chief justice of the Arkansas Supreme Court from 1884 to 1893.

== Early life, education and military service ==
Born in Nashville, Tennessee, to a father also named Sterling Robertson Cockrill and Henrietta McDonald Cockrill, the family moved to Pine Bluff, Arkansas, in 1855, where Cockrill was raised. At the outbreak of the American Civil War, Cockrill was attending school in Nashville, after which he entered the military school at Marietta, Georgia. At age 16, he volunteered in the Confederate States Army, becoming a sergeant of artillery in Johnston's army at the age of 17, in the latter days of the war.

After the war he received an undergraduate degree from Washington College (now Washington and Lee University), in Lexington, Virginia, and thereafter graduated from Cumberland School of Law, in Lebanon, Tennessee, in 1870. In October of that year, he moved to Little Rock, Arkansas, in October, 1870, where he would reside for the rest of his life. Entering the practice of law, he soon became associated in the practice with Hon. Augustus H. Garland, as Garland & Cockrill, which continued until Garland became governor in 1874.

== Judicial service ==
In 1884, on the death of Chief Justice Elbert H. English, Cockrill was nominated for the position by the state Democratic convention, and was elected later that year, at the age of 37. He was reelected in September, 1888. As chief justice, Cockrill supported codification of procedures and upheld legislative enactments from the Reconstruction era, aligning Arkansas with national standards. Cockrill presided over several significant cases. In Beard v. State, 43 Ark. 284 (1884), he upheld a law penalizing the sale of mortgaged crop parts, emphasizing the importance of legislative authority. In Maddox v. Neal, 45 Ark. 121 (1885), he supported opening a school for Black children in Crawford County, reflecting a commitment to equal educational access despite financial constraints.

On May 1, 1893, he resigned as chief justice and returned to the private practice of law. For a time he was a partner of Judge George H. Sanders, and for several years was associated with his son, Ashley Cockrill, under the firm name of Cockrill & Cockrill. He had a very extensive practice in state and federal courts.

== Personal life and death ==
In May 1872, Cockrill married Mary Ashley Freeman, granddaughter of former U.S. senator Chester Ashley and Episcopal Bishop George Freeman. They had five sons and a daughter. Cockrill died of pneumonia following a bout of influenza. His passing was widely mourned, and he was interred at Mount Holly Cemetery in Little Rock.

A later Sterling R. Cockrill, descended from the same ancestors, was a civic leader and elected official in Arkansas.

Political offices
Preceded by Elbert H. English	Chief Justice of the Arkansas Supreme Court; 1884–1893	Succeeded by Henry Gaston Bunn
