= Ben Carter (Arkansas judge) =

American judge (c. 1895–1943)

Ben Carter (c. 1895 – April 11, 1943) was a justice of the Arkansas Supreme Court for four months, taking office January 1, 1943, and serving until his death less than four months later, in 1943.

== Biography ==
Born in Texarkana, Arkansas, Carter attended Phillips Exeter Academy, and received degrees from Harvard College and Harvard Law School. He served in the United States Army during World War I, including 18 months of service in France, where he was a field artillery captain. He then served as a city attorney for two terms, during which time he argued a utilities case before the Supreme Court of the United States, and then served two terms as a member of the Arkansas House of Representatives, for Miller County, Arkansas.

In 1941, Governor Homer Martin Adkins appointed Carter to chair the state utilities commission, and he was described as "the protege of the Adkins administration". As a candidate for a seat on the state supreme court, he ran against Eastern Arkansas lawyer Arthur Adams, eking out a narrow victory despite Adams' strong support in the east.

== Death ==
Carter died of a heart attack at the age of 48.

Political offices
Preceded by Karl Greenhaw	Justice of the Arkansas Supreme Court; 1943–1943	Succeeded by Robert C. Knox
