= Stone House (Fayetteville, Arkansas) =

Historic house in Arkansas, United States

- U.S. National Register of Historic Places
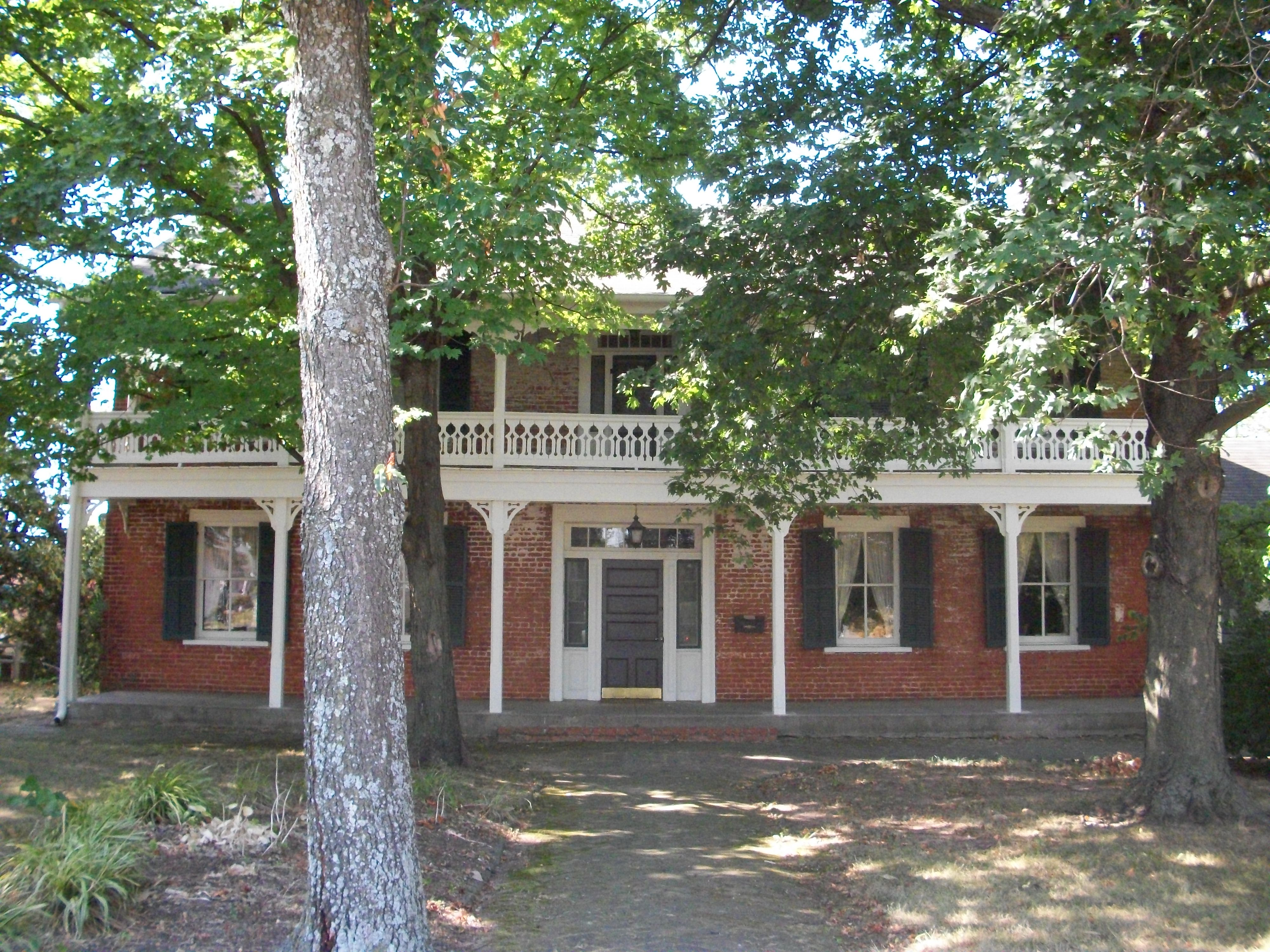

- Location within Arkansas Location within the United States
- Location: 207 Center St., Fayetteville, Arkansas
- Coordinates: 36°3′17″N 94°9′56″W
- Area: less than one acre
- Built: 1845
- NRHP reference No.: 70000132
- Added to NRHP: September 4, 1970

The Stone House, also known as the Walker-Stone House, is a historic house at 207 Center Street in Fayetteville, Arkansas. It is a two-story brick building, with a side-gable roof, a two-story porch extending across the front, and an ell attached to the left. The porch has particularly elaborate Victorian styling, with bracketed posts and a jigsawn balustrade on the second level. The house was built in 1845, by David Walker, and is one of a small number of Fayetteville properties to survive the American Civil War (although it was damaged by a shell). It was owned for many years by the Stone family, and reacquired by a Stone descendant in the late 1960s with an eye toward its restoration.

The house was listed on the National Register of Historic Places in 1970.

== See also ==
- National Register of Historic Places listings in Washington County, Arkansas
