= Judge Hay =

Judge Hay may refer to:

- Eugene Gano Hay (1853–1933), member of the Board of General Appraisers
- George Hay (Virginia judge) (1765–1830), judge of the United States District Court for the Eastern District of Virginia
- James Hay (politician) (1856–1931), judge of the United States Court of Claims
- George D. Hay (1895–1968), radio announcer and country music pioneer
