= Robert A. Leflar =

American judge (1901–1997)

Robert Allen Leflar (March 22, 1901 – July 8, 1997) was a justice of the Arkansas Supreme Court from 1949 to 1950.

Leflar was born in Siloam Springs, Arkansas. During his collegiate career, he was a member of the debate team. He would later graduate from University of Arkansas with a BA in 1922. In 1923, he was a faculty member at John Brown University. He then went to Harvard Law School, graduating with a LLB in 1927 and a SJD in 1932. After graduating from law school, he was an instructor at the University of Arkansas School of Law and eventually became the school's dean in 1946. Leflar was the dean of the law school when Silas Herbert Hunt applied and was accepted into the law school, the first black applicant to a law school in the South.

Leflar was a candidate for a seat on the state supreme court in 1942, but lost a close race for the nomination to R. W. Robins. From 1942 to 1944, Leflar was the attorney for the War Relocation Authority, the federal agency tasked with placing Japanese Americans in internment camps during World War II. Robins died in 1949, and Governor Sid McMath appointed Leflar to the vacant supreme court seat for the remainder of the term.

Leflar died in 1997 in Fayetteville, Arkansas.

Political offices
Preceded by R. W. Robins	Justice of the Arkansas Supreme Court; 1949–1950	Succeeded by Sam Robinson
