= Freeman W. Compton =

American judge (1824–1893)

F.W. Compton

Associate Justice of the Arkansas Supreme Court
- In office 1859–1864
- Preceded by: Felix I. Batson
- Succeeded by: removed during Reconstruction
- In office 1866–1868
- Preceded by: Charles A. Harper
- Succeeded by: Lafayette Gregg
- In office 1874–1874
- Preceded by: John E. Bennett
- Succeeded by: William M. Harrison

Personal details
- Born: Freeman Walker Compton; January 15, 1824 Orange County, North Carolina
- Died: May 28, 1893 (aged 69) Little Rock
- Cause of death: pneumonia
- Resting place: Oakland Cemetery
- Party: Democratic
- Spouse: Susan Frances Lea
- Occupation: Lawyer, judge

Freeman Walker Compton (January 15, 1824 – May 28, 1893) was a justice of the Arkansas Supreme Court from 1859 to 1864, again from 1866 to 1868, and again in 1874.

== Early life ==
Born in Orange County, North Carolina, he "received a good education in the schools of his native state", and attended the law school operated by North Carolina Chief Justice Richmond Mumford Pearson, graduating in 1844.

== Career ==
He settled at Greeneville, Tennessee, where he was admitted to the bar, and practiced law until 1849, when he moved to Arkansas. There, he first settled at Princeton, Dallas County, where he practiced law until 1852, when he moved to Camden, Arkansas.

Historian Fay Hempstead described Compton's reputation as a lawyer:

His mind was as strong as his body, but both physically and intellectually, he was singularly slow and lethargic. He was a powerful lawyer when aroused and when he had had time for preparation, but he could do nothing in a hurry, and he could no more be hurried than the pyramids of Egypt. No matter how impatient court or counsel might become, they could make no impression upon him. He could move only at a certain pace, and that a very slow one, and it was useless to try to force him to adopt a more rapid gait. When, however, he was retained in a case of sufficient importance and with a fee that was adequate to his demands, he was a man of extraordinary power. He would not take it up until he was ready, which meant that the delay would be considerable, and he was so large and so inert that no one ever succeeded in hurrying him into a trial. In his own good season he would have the case set down, and then his opponent had to look well to his laurels. By that time he had not merely read the cases bearing upon the subject, but he had thought about it profoundly, and his views were original and bold.

Compton was a loquacious speaker and it took him time to gather his thoughts, but his writing was described as "remarkably terse and clear; never using a superfluous word".

In 1858 he was elected by the Arkansas General Assembly to fill a vacant spot as an associate justice of the state supreme court, and in 1866 was again elected to the court, but was ousted in 1868 by Reconstruction era measures. After the war, he took up his residence at Little Rock, where he remained in the practice of law until his death, aside from a brief reappointment to the court in June 1874.

== Personal life and death ==
Compton had a wife, who died before him, with whom he had three daughters.

He suffered from Bright's disease, which contributed to his death from pneumonia, at his home in Little Rock, at the age of 69. His residence was at Ninth and Bishop streets. He was interred at Oakland Cemetery in Little Rock, and various resolutions were prepared in his honor by the state.

Political offices
Preceded by Felix Ives Batson	Justice of the Arkansas Supreme Court; 1859–1864	Succeeded by John J. Clendenin
Preceded by Charles A. Harper	1866–1868	Succeeded by Lafayette Gregg
Preceded by John E. Bennett	1874–1874	Succeeded by William M. Harrison
