= Darrell Hickman =

American judge (1935–2026)

Darrell David Hickman (February 6, 1935 – August 20, 2026) was an American judge who was a justice of the Arkansas Supreme Court from 1977 to 1990.

== Life and career ==
Darrell David Hickman was born on February 6, 1935. He attended Harding College (now Harding University) in Searcy before transferring to the University of Arkansas (UA) in Fayetteville, from which he received his law degree. He worked three summers scaling logs at a lumber camp for the U.S. Forest Service near Fresno, California, before graduating from UA in 1958 with a law degree.

Hickman became the Chancellor of Arkansas, and in 1976 ran as a Democrat for election to the state supreme court; he was unopposed in the general election.

He stepped down ten months ahead of schedule, citing professional burnout and a desire to travel.

Hickman died in his hometown of Searcy on August 20, 2026, at the age of 91.

Political offices
Preceded by Elsijane Trimble Roy	Justice of the Arkansas Supreme Court; 1977–1990	Succeeded by Dale Price
