= William Conway (Arkansas judge) =

American judge (1805–1852)

William B. Conway (January 14, 1805 – December 29, 1852) was a justice of the Arkansas Supreme Court from 1847 to 1849.

Born near Greeneville, Tennessee, Conway was the brother of Elias Nelson Conway, who became Governor of Arkansas. Conway was given no middle name at birth, but adopted one later in life:

The letter B was added after his name to distinguish him from another William Conway, who was constantly getting his mail, and the confusion between the two was increased by the fact that neither of them had a middle name, so he added the B, standing for Bardstown (Kentucky), where he had once lived, and by this designation his name appears throughout the whole series of court decisions while he was on the bench.

Conway became an Arkansas circuit judge in 1830, and in 1847 was appointed to succeed Judge Edward Cross on the state supreme court. Cross was described as "a good man, but of small learning and capacity".

Conway died in Little Rock, Arkansas at the age of 47, and was buried next to his mother in Mount Holly Cemetery.

== See also ==
- List of Arkansas adjutants general

Military offices
Preceded by Colonel John N. Boyle	Adjutant General of Arkansas; 1837–1838	Succeeded by Colonel Samuel H. Hempstead
Political offices
Preceded by Edward Cross	Justice of the Arkansas Supreme Court; 1847–1849	Succeeded by David Walker
