= Edward Mansfield =

Edward Mansfield may refer to:

- Edward Deering Mansfield (1801–1880), American author
- Edward D. Mansfield, professor of political science
- Edward S. Mansfield (1870–?), electrical engineer
- Edward Mansfield (judge) (born 1957), Justice of the Iowa Supreme Court

== See also ==
- Edward Mansvelt (fl. 1660s), Dutch buccaneer
- Eamonn Mansfield (1878–1954), Irish schoolteacher and public servant
