= John Mansfield =

John Mansfield may refer to:

- John Mansfield (Beverley MP), member for Beverley (UK Parliament constituency) in 1593
- John Mansfield (American politician) (1822–1896), American soldier and politician
- John Mansfield (English politician) (1889–1970), British trade unionist and politician
- Sir John Mansfield (Royal Navy officer) (1893–1949), British admiral
- John Mansfield (footballer) (born 1946), English footballer
- John Mansfield (judge) (born 1946), Australian judge
- John Mansfield (actor), American stage and television actor
- John Mansfield School, a school in the Dogsthorpe area of Peterborough, England, 1957–2007
