= Steele Hays =

American judge (1925–2011)

Steele Hays (March 25, 1925 – June 22, 2011) was a justice of the Arkansas Supreme Court from 1981 to 1994.

Born in Little Rock, Arkansas, Hays received a B.A. in history and political science from the University of Arkansas in 1948, and a J.D. from George Washington University in 1948. In 1979, Governor Bill Clinton appointed Hays to the inaugural bench of the Arkansas Court of Appeals, and in 1981, elevated Hays to the state supreme court. Hays retired from the court in 1994.

Hays died at the age of 86 in a hospital in Conway, Arkansas, due to complications from a lung disease.

Political offices
Preceded by John F. Stroud Jr.	Justice of the Arkansas Supreme Court; 1981–1994	Succeeded by Andree Layton Roaf
