= Eric Mansfield =

Eric Mansfield may refer to:

- Eric Harold Mansfield (1923–2016), aeronautical engineer
- Eric L. Mansfield, North Carolina state senator
