= Eakins =

Eakins is an English surname. People with this name include:

- Dallas Eakins (born 1967), Canadian ice hockey defenseman and head coach
- Jim Eakins (born 1946), American basketball player
- John Eakins (1923/4–1998), Canadian politician
- Peter Eakins (1947–1999), Australian rules footballer
- Susan Macdowell Eakins (1851–1938), American artist, wife of Thomas Eakins
- Thomas Eakins (1844–1916), American artist

== See also ==
- Eakin
- Ekins (surname)
