= Ekin =

Ekin (Turkish: [e̞ˈkin]) is a unisex Turkish given name meaning crop or culture. And may refer to:

== Given name ==
- Ekin Cheng, Hong Kong singer and actor
- Ekin Deligöz, German politician of Turkish descent
- Ekin Koç (born 1992), Turkish actor
- Ekin Mert Daymaz (born 1990), Turkish actor and model
- Ekin-Su Cülcüloğlu, British-Turkish actress and television personality
- Ekin Tunçay Turan, Turkish stage actress and translator

== Surnames ==
- Hirose Kinzō also known as Ekin, Japanese painter
- Tom Ekin, Irish politician

== Places ==
- Ekin, Indiana
