= Thomas P. Eskridge =

Superior Court of Arkansas Territory jurist (c. 1797–1835)

Thomas P. Eskridge (c. 1797 – November 30, 1835) was an American jurist who served on the Superior Court of Arkansas Territory, precursor to the Arkansas Supreme Court.

== Early life ==
Born in Staunton, Virginia, to William and Elizabeth Scott Eskridge, Thomas was one of potentially ten children. He acquired legal expertise by clerking for a Virginia attorney before relocating to the Arkansas Territory around 1820.

== Career ==
In 1823, Eskridge was appointed to the First Judicial Circuit Court. Initially, he pursued a political career, declaring his candidacy for territorial representative to Congress as a Democratic-Republican. His platform included expediting the Choctaw Treaty, defining the Missouri-Arkansas boundary, facilitating settlements in Lovely's Purchase, resolving Spanish land claims, establishing a surveyor general's office, improving access along the Red River, and constructing a military road from Chickasaw Bluff. He withdrew his candidacy at the behest of acting governor Robert Crittenden, favoring Henry W. Conway.

In 1827, Eskridge was appointed to the Superior Court. During his tenure, the court primarily dealt with land deed disputes and appeals from lower courts.
