= Newberne, West Virginia =

- Unincorporated community
- Location within West Virginia Location within the United States
- Coordinates: 39°02′38″N 80°53′34″W
- Country: United States
- State: West Virginia
- County: Gilmer
- Elevation: 863 ft (263 m)
- Time zone: UTC-5 (Eastern (EST))
  - Summer (DST): UTC-4 (EDT)
- Area codes: 304 & 681
- GNIS feature ID: 1555212

Newberne is an unincorporated community in Gilmer County, West Virginia, United States. Newberne is located along County Route 7 and Tanner Creek, 8.1 miles (13.0 km) north-northwest of Glenville. Newberne had a post office, which closed on May 13, 1995.
