= Carroll D. Wood =

American judge

Carroll D. Wood (July 8, 1858 – December 19, 1941) was an associate justice of the Arkansas Supreme Court from 1893 to 1929.

Wood was born in Ashley County, Arkansas where he also grew up. The son of a Baptist minister, he became a lawyer after graduating the University of Arkansas in 1879. Following his graduation Wood began practicing law and served twice as the Drew County, Arkansas prosecuting attorney from 1881 to 1886. He then served twice as a circuit court judge for circuit 10 of Arkansas from 1886 to 1893. In 1893 Wood was elected to position 4 of the Arkansas Supreme Court, an office he held until shortly before his death.

During the gubernatorial election of 1904 Justice Carroll D. Wood ran against incumbent Jeff Davis, M.J. Manning, and A. F. Vandeventer. Davis won this election and retained his office as governor, while Wood continued on as Supreme Court judge.

Wood retired from the court on May 20, 1929, and was succeeded by Turner Butler.

== Personal ==
Carroll D. Wood is the father of Major General John Shirley Wood.
