= Archibald Yell =

U.S. Politician from Arkansas

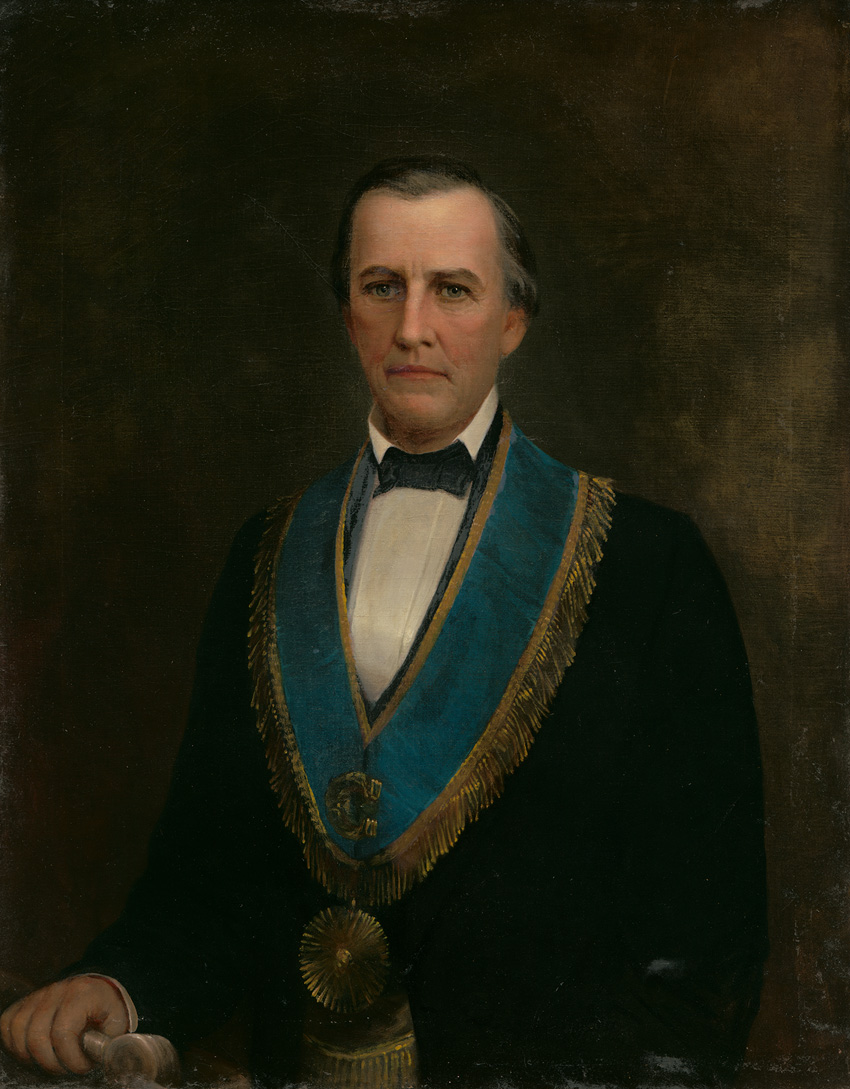
- Portrait by Washington Bogart Cooper

Member of the U.S. House of Representatives from Arkansas's at-large district
- In office December 1, 1845 – July 1, 1846
- Preceded by: Edward Cross
- Succeeded by: Thomas Willoughby Newton
- In office December 5, 1836 – March 3, 1839
- Preceded by: New constituency
- Succeeded by: Edward Cross

2nd Governor of Arkansas
- In office November 4, 1840 – April 29, 1844
- Preceded by: James Conway
- Succeeded by: Samuel Adams (acting)

11th Grand Master of the Grand Lodge of Tennessee
- In office 1831–1832
- Preceded by: Hugh W. Dunlap
- Succeeded by: Dudley S. Jennings

Personal details
- Born: August 9, 1797 United States
- Died: February 23, 1847 (aged 49) Coahuila, Mexico
- Resting place: Evergreen Cemetery, Fayetteville, Arkansas; 36°03′53.3″N 94°10′08.7″W
- Party: Democratic

Military service
- Service: United States Volunteers
- Years of service: 1812–1815; 1818; 1846–1847
- Rank: Brevet Brigadier-General
- Commands: Arkansas Mounted Infantry Regiment (1846-47)
- Battles: War of 1812; Battle of New Orleans; Indian Wars; Creek War; First Seminole War; Mexican War; Battle of Buena Vista †

Archibald Yell (August 9, 1797 – February 23, 1847) was an American politician and lawyer who served as the U.S. representative from Arkansas from 1836 to 1839, and 1845 to 1846. He was the second governor of Arkansas, serving from 1840 to 1844. Yell was killed in action during the Mexican-American War at the Battle of Buena Vista on February 23, 1847.

== Early life ==
Yell was likely born in Kentucky or Tennessee, although his headstone lists North Carolina as his birthplace. His family first settled in Jefferson County in East Tennessee, then moved to Rutherford County in Middle Tennessee, and finally settled in Bedford County to the south. As a youth, Yell participated in the Creek War, serving in 1813 and early 1814 under General Andrew Jackson. In 1814 and 1815, during the War of 1812, he served with Jackson in Louisiana, including in the Battle of New Orleans. He returned to Tennessee, and read law as a legal apprentice. He was admitted to the bar in Fayetteville, Tennessee. In 1818, he joined Jackson's army during the First Seminole War in Florida. He was active in freemasonry, and was the Grand Master of the Tennessee Lodge in 1830. By 1840, Yell owned 800 acres of land and 8 slaves.

== Political career ==
Active in the Democratic Party, Yell moved to the Arkansas Territory in 1831 to head the federal land office in Little Rock. The federal government offered him the governorship of the Florida Territory the following year, but he declined. On March 21, 1832, Yell was appointed adjutant general of the Arkansas Territory with the rank of Colonel in place of Colonel Whorton Rector who had resigned. His time as adjutant general was apparently cut short by malaria." Yell left Arkansas for a time to recoup back home in Tennessee, but by 1835, returned to Arkansas, having been appointed as a Judge of the Superior Court, the highest court in the territory. He was considered a friend of Andrew Jackson, who may have had a hand in some of his appointments to government jobs. He was a strong supporter and personal friend of President James K. Polk. Just prior to taking office in 1845, Polk sent Yell to Texas to advocate for its annexation to the union. He is reported to have single-handedly retrieved a criminal from a local saloon and physically brought him to his court.

Yell was elected to the United States House of Representatives in 1836, after Arkansas was admitted to the Union. He served one term, from December 5, 1836, to March 3, 1839. While in Washington, he was a strong supporter of Texan statehood and favored a stronger military. Around this time that he formed the first Masonic lodge in Arkansas at Fayetteville.

In 1840, Yell was elected Governor of Arkansas. He focused on internal improvements, as infrastructure was needed to benefit planters and farmers. He also worked to better control banks and supported public education. Yell resigned his post as governor to run again for Congress in 1844 at age 47, and won the seat. He is reported to have been the consummate campaigner. At one stop during the campaign, he is said to have won a shooting match, donated meat to the poor, and bought a jug of whiskey for the crowd.

Soon after he took his seat in Congress, the Mexican War began. Yell returned to Arkansas and formed the Arkansas Mounted Infantry Regiment. His men included the future governor John Selden Roane, and future Confederate generals Albert Pike, Solon Borland, and James Fleming Fagan. His cavalry compiled a record of insubordination. General John E. Wool, commander of the Arkansas mounted volunteers, said they were, "wholly without instruction, and Colonel Yell is determined to leave (them) in that condition." Yell, he continued, had a "total ignorance of his duties as Colonel." During the Mexican War, he was brevetted a brigadier general of United States Volunteers.

On February 23, 1847, Yell was killed in action at the Battle of Buena Vista at age 49. He was originally buried on the battlefield in Mexico. His body was removed and returned to Arkansas for burial at Waxhaws Cemetery in Fayetteville. When Evergreen Cemetery was established in the city, the Freemasons arranged for his body to be relocated and reinterred in the Masonic section of that cemetery.

== Personal life ==
Yell met Mary Scott in Bedford County, Tennessee, where they were neighbors. They married in 1821 after he had started to establish his law practice. She had one daughter, Mary, who was born January 5, 1823. Mary Scott Yell died from complications following their daughter's birth. A few years later in 1828, he married Nancy Moore of Danville, Kentucky. They had four children before her death. He later married Maria (McIlvaine) Ficklin, a widow. They had no children. Maria died on October 15, 1838, while he was serving in Congress. His nephew James Yell (1811–1867) became Major-General of the Arkansas Militia during the American Civil War.

== Honors ==
Yell County and Yellville, Arkansas, are named after him, as was the "Yell Rifles", an antebellum militia company from Helena. The former Yell County, Iowa was merged with Risley County to become Webster County, Iowa in 1853, but two townships in the vicinity, Yell Township, Webster County, Iowa and Yell Township, Boone County, Iowa have retained the Yell name.

A small segment of former US Highway 71 Business (US 71B) was named Archibald Yell Boulevard in Fayetteville until 2022. Yell's legacy was reexamined during a construction project on the roadway; the city council renamed the road Nelson Hackett Boulevard. Hackett escaped slavery in Arkansas and fled to Canada in 1841, where he remained until extradited back to Arkansas at the request of Yell on behalf of the slaveowner.

== See also ==
- List of Arkansas adjutants general
- List of Freemasons
- List of governors of Arkansas
- Malcolm Gilchrist (speculator)

Party political offices
Preceded by James Sevier Conway	Democratic nominee for Governor of Arkansas; 1840	Succeeded by Thomas Stevenson Drew
Masonic offices
Preceded by Hugh W. Dunlap	Grand Master of the Grand Lodge of Tennessee; 1831	Succeeded by Dudley S. Jennings
Military offices
Preceded by Colonel Wharton Rector, Jr.	Adjutant General of the Arkansas Territory; 1832–1833	Succeeded by Colonel William Field
U.S. House of Representatives
New constituency	Member of the U.S. House of Representatives from Arkansas's at-large congressional district 1836–1839	Succeeded by Edward Cross
Preceded by Edward Cross	Member of the U.S. House of Representatives from Arkansas's at-large congressional district 1845–1846	Succeeded by Thomas Willoughby Newton
Political offices
Preceded by James Sevier Conway	Governor of Arkansas; 1840–1844	Succeeded by Samuel Adams; Acting
