= William W. Mansfield =

American judge (1830–1912)

William Walker Mansfield (January 16, 1830 – July 27, 1912) was a lawyer, state legislator, and justice of the Arkansas Supreme Court. He served on the Arkansas Supreme Court from 1891 to 1894.

Born in Scottsville, Kentucky, Mansfield "received a 'common-school' education" and read law under Judge William V. Loving of Bowling Green, Kentucky, gaining admission to the bar in Kentucky in 1852. Mansfield moved to Arkansas in 1856. He was elected to the Arkansas House of Representatives the same year. He was a delegate to the 1861 Arkansas Constitutional Convention and the Secession Convention of 1861. He was also a delegate to the 1874 Arkansas Constitutional Convention.

Mansfield was elected as a circuit Judge for the Fifth Judicial Circuit and served from 1874 until 1878. He served as Digester of Arkansas Statutes in 1884 and was a Supreme Court Reporter from 1887 until 1890. He was elected to be an Associate Justice in 1891, serving until his retirement in 1894.

Mansfield died in Ozark, Arkansas, at the age of 82.

Political offices
Preceded by Monte H. Sandels	Justice of the Arkansas Supreme Court; 1891–1894	Succeeded by James E. Riddick
