= Charles A. Harper =

American judge

Charles A. Harper (sometimes denoted as C. A. Harper; born c. 1815) was a justice of the Arkansas Supreme Court from 1864 to 1866.

== Early life, education, and military service ==
Born in Canterbury, New Hampshire, Harper was one of two sons of New Hampshire politician Joseph M. Harper. Harper graduated from Dartmouth College in 1834, at the age of nineteen. He read law, and commenced practice in Clarksburg, Virginia, where he remained for several years. Poor health compelled him to move to a milder climate. In 1845 he went to Texas, and became deeply interested in the Mexican–American War. When a volunteer regiment was called for from that state, he joined the one commanded by Colonel Jack Hays, was chosen adjutant, and acted as such through the campaign. At the Battle of Monterey this regiment was with the division commanded by General William J. Worth, and was the first to enter the city following a three-day battle.

After the Mexican–American War, Harper married and practiced law for a time in Indianola, Texas

== Judicial service and later life ==
Towards the end of the American Civil War, Harper moved to Van Buren, Arkansas, residing there "perhaps for only two years" before being elected to the Arkansas Supreme Court in an 1864 election limited to voters deemed qualified by the Union government. Harper was one of three justices elected under the Civil War-era Constitution of 1864, the others being Thomas D. W. Yonley and Elisha Baxter. Baxter resigned within a few months of his appointment, while Harper and Yonley "decided only five cases in the June 1866 term" before their resignation in 1866, after which they were replaced in the election of August 1866. Harper thereafter "returned to the North". Of them it was written that they "were in office but a short time, and produced no great impression".

Political offices
| Preceded by Albert Pike | Justice of the Arkansas Supreme Court; 1864–1866 | Succeeded by Freeman W. Compton |
