= Thomas D. W. Yonley =

American judge (1827–1888)

Thomas Daniel Webster Yonley (1827 – June 1, 1888) was an American lawyer and Unionist who served as chief justice of the Arkansas Supreme Court from 1864 to 1866, and Arkansas Attorney General from 1873 to 1874.

== Early life and career ==
Originally from the section of Virginia that became West Virginia, Yonley relocated to Little Rock in 1859, and began the practice of law. According to historian Fay Hempstead, when the American Civil War broke out, Yonley being a Unionist, "went North". Ernest Dumas, writing for the Encyclopedia of Arkansas, wrote that Yonley "traveled to Missouri, where he supposedly joined the Federal army, although little is known about his actual service on either side". In either case, he returned to Little Rock after its capture by the Federal forces on September 10, 1863. He and William Fishback represented David O. Dodd, who was executed as a Confederate spy. and Yonley and Fishback published the Unconditional Unionist in Little Rock from 1864 to 1866.

In 1864, Yonley was one of the delegates from Pulaski County to the Arkansas Constitutional Convention that produced the Arkansas Constitution of 1864.

== Judicial service and later life ==
At the election held under the 1864 constitution, he was made Chief Justice of the Supreme Court. Yonley was one of three justices elected, the others being Charles A. Harper and Elisha Baxter. Baxter resigned within a few months of his appointment, and Yonley and Harper resigned in 1866, and were replaced in the election of August 1866. They were described as having been "in office but a short time, and produced no great impression", and Yonley in particular was described as "preferring the active practice of his profession" to serving on the court. Yonley was noted, however, as the author of one consequential opinion, in the case of Rison et al. v. Farr, which restored the right to vote to many former Confederate soldiers, and which inadvertently "contributed to a harsh retribution from the federal government, which imposed martial law on Arkansas and other Southern states for several years".

Upon the establishment of the Constitution of 1868, Yonley was made Chancellor of the Pulaski Chancery Court, a state office, which he resigned in 1872, to run for Attorney-General on the ticket with Elisha Baxter, as the Republican nominee for Governor. Yonley became Arkansas Attorney General on January 8, 1873, and served in that capacity until the Constitution of 1874 was established, when he was briefly succeeded by J. L. Witherspoon, who was ousted in the election that year by Confederate General Simon P. Hughes. Yonley then resumed the practice of law. In 1878, the Democrats having regained control of the government in Arkansas, Yonley and his family moved to Denver, Colorado, where Yonley "became part of the city's leading law firm", and gained distinction in his legal practice, and ran for political offices as a Republican.

== Personal life and death ==
In September 1857, shortly before coming to Little Rock, Yonley married Margaret LeSuer in Omaha, Nebraska. She was described as "a gifted lady, who became a fine elocutionist, a thorough Shakespearean student, and a prominent leader in society". They had two sons. Margaret Yonley died in Denver on November 23, 1887, shortly after having paid a visit to Little Rock. Yonley died at Eureka Springs, Arkansas, the following June, having gone there to recuperate his health. His remains were conveyed to Denver, and buried beside those of his wife.

== See also ==
- List of justices of the Arkansas Supreme Court

Political offices
Preceded by Elbert H. English	Justice of the Arkansas Supreme Court; 1864–1866	Succeeded by David Walker
Preceded by J. R. Montgomery	Arkansas Attorney General; 1873–1874	Succeeded by J. L. Witherspoon
