= Charles Mansfield =

Charles Mansfield may refer to:

- Charles John Moore Mansfield (1760–1813), British naval officer
- Charles Blachford Mansfield (1819–1855), British chemist and author
- Sir Charles Edward Mansfield (1828–1907), British army officer and diplomat
