= Ekins (surname) =

Ekins is a surname, and may refer to:

- Bud Ekins (1930–2007), American stuntman
- Charles Ekins (1768–1855), Royal Navy officer
- Dave Ekins (born 1932), American off-road racer
- George Ekins (1871–1960), English footballer
- Helen Ekins (1879–1964), British horticulturist and educational administrator
- Jeffery Ekins (died 1791), English clergyman
- Joe Ekins (born 1924), British Army soldier
- Paul Ekins (born 1950), British economist
- Richard Ekins, New Zealand legal academic
- Roger Ekins (1926–2016), British biophysicist
- Sean Ekins, British pharmacologist
- Tony Ekins (born 1944), British field hockey player

== See also ==
- Eakins
