= Edward Cross (politician) =

American judge

Associate Justice of the Arkansas Supreme Court
- In office July 1845 – 1855
- Preceded by: Thomas J. Lacy
- Succeeded by: William Conway

Member of the U.S. House of Representatives from Arkansas's at-large district
- In office March 4, 1839 – March 3, 1845
- Preceded by: Archibald Yell
- Succeeded by: Archibald Yell

Personal details
- Born: November 11, 1798 Hawkins County, Tennessee
- Died: April 6, 1887 (aged 88) Hempstead County, Arkansas
- Citizenship: United States
- Party: Democratic
- Children: David Cross; Mary Frances Witherspoon
- Profession: Attorney judge politician railway president

Edward Cross (November 11, 1798 – April 6, 1887) was a judge, surveyor, and Democratic member of the United States House of Representatives from the state of Arkansas.

== Biography ==
Cross was born in Hawkins County, Tennessee, and he attended public schools during his youth. He studied law and was admitted to the bar. He owned slaves.

== Career ==
In 1826 Cross moved to Arkansas and was appointed as a Judge of the Superior Court of the Arkansas Territory on May 26, 1830. From April 30, 1836, to September 1, 1838, he served as United States surveyor general for Arkansas.

Cross was elected as a Democrat to the Twenty-sixth, Twenty-seventh, and Twenty-eighth United States Congresses between March 4, 1839, and March 3, 1845. During the Twenty-eighth Congress he served as chairman of the Committee on Private Land Claims.

Cross served as a justice of the Arkansas Supreme Court from July 1845 to 1855. Cross served as president of the Cairo & Fulton Railway (later the St. Louis, Iron Mountain and Southern Railway from 1855 to 1862. In 1874 he was appointed attorney general of Arkansas.

== Death ==
Cross died at his residence, Marlbrook, near Washington, Hempstead County, Arkansas on 6 April 1887 (age 88 years, 146 days). He was interred at his residence, then his remains were moved and interred at the Marlbrook Cemetery near modern-day Blevins, Arkansas in the 20th century. Cross County, Arkansas is named for his son, David Cross.

U.S. House of Representatives
Preceded by Archibald Yell	Member of the U.S. House of Representatives from Arkansas's at-large congressional district March 4, 1839 – March 3, 1845	Succeeded by Archibald Yell
