= Henry Gaston Bunn =

American judge

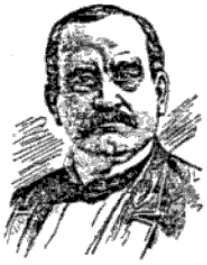
- Born: June 12, 1838; Rocky Mount, North Carolina, US
- Died: July 17, 1908 (aged 70); El Dorado, Arkansas, US
- Occupations: Soldier, lawyer and politician
- Years active: 1850s-1900s
- Known for: see below
- Notable work: see below

Henry Gaston Bunn

Member of the Arkansas Senate
- In office 1873–1874

Chief Justice of the Arkansas Supreme Court
- In office 1893–1896
- Appointed by: William Meade Fishback
- Preceded by: Sterling R. Cockrill
- Succeeded by: Joseph Morrison Hill

Personal details
- Party: Democrat

Henry Gaston Bunn (June 12, 1838 – July 17, 1908) was an American lawyer, soldier, and politician who served as Chief Justice of the Arkansas Supreme Court.

== Life and career ==
Henry Gaston Bunn was born in 1838 in Rocky Mount, North Carolina, to David (?-1858) and Elizabeth (née Thomas) Bunn but his family moved to Fayette County, Tennessee, in 1844 and to Ouachita County, Arkansas, in 1846. His Anglo-Saxon grandparents had emigrated from England at an early but unknown time of American history.

In February 1859, he started attending Davidson College where he was a member of Eumenean Society. He enlisted as a private in the Confederate States Army, subsequently a lieutenant and eventually become a commander of the 4th Arkansas Infantry Battalion in November 1862, under the command of Evander McNair. Bunn was wounded and captured at the Battle of Pea Ridge but escaped alive and found his team again where they joined General Earl Van Dorn's army, crossing the east side of the Mississippi River where they ultimately joined forces with General P. G. T. Beauregard's troops. Bunn was also involved in the Battle of Farmington, Mississippi, and joined Edmund Kirby Smith in the Battle of Richmond in Kentucky, during which he was promoted to colonel. Bunn also participated in the Battle of Stones River and, with General Joseph E. Johnston, the Siege of Vicksburg and Atlanta campaign in Georgia. On July 28, 1864, he was wounded at the Battle of Ezra Church until recovering in February 1865 to fight at the Battle of Bentonville in March 1865. His time with the ear ended when General Johnston's army surrendered and he chose to pursue a career in law.

Studying law in Arkansas. he was admitted to the bar in 1866. From 1873 to 1874, he served as State Senator, becoming involved in the Brooks–Baxter War, until becoming an Ouachita County-based delegate to the constitutional commission in 1874, in which he was a chairman of the committee on bill of rights and a member of the judiciary committee. He was also a special judge on the supreme and circuit branch and president of the Arkansas Bar Association. On 1893, he became a trustee of the University of Arkansas and, that May 1893, was appointed by Governor William Meade Fishback to replace Sterling R. Cockrill as Chief Justice, after Bunn unsuccessfully ran for Chief Justice in 1884, 1885 and 1889. In 1896 he was nominated by the Democratic state convention and elected that September where he served eight years.

In the early 1900s, he was involved in a confrontation with then-Attorney General Jeff Davis after Davis started removing his coat and Bunn criticized him for that, saying "a gentleman would not appear in his shirt sleeves before the Supreme Court". Later, Davis retorted to audiences, asking if he could remove his coat because the "five jackasses" at the Supreme Court would not allow it. Meanwhile, the Arkansas Gazette praised Bunn for his "ability as a jurist and for his honesty and integrity". This was not the first time Bunn and Davis caused a stir, the previous year in 1903, Bunn was the lone naysayer involving Davis's veto of over 300 bills. In 1904, he opened and operated a private law practice with W. E. Patterson until Bunn's death in 1908.

On September 6, 1865, he married Louisa E. Holmes, daughter of Colonel W. T. M. Holmes killed in the Confederate War. With her death on July 5, 1866, he married Aralee Connolly, also a daughter of a Confederate Army soldier, with whom he had nine children but only five survived. Bunn was buried at Oakland Cemetery in Camden, Arkansas.
