= John E. Bennett (judge) =

American judge (1833–1893)

Associate Justice of the South Dakota Supreme Court
- In office October 5, 1889 – December 31, 1893

Associate Justice of the Arkansas Supreme Court
- In office 1871–1874
- Preceded by: Thomas M. Bowen
- Succeeded by: Freeman W. Compton

Personal details
- Born: March 18, 1833 East Bethany, Genesee County, New York
- Died: December 31, 1893 (aged 60) Pierre, South Dakota

John Emory Bennett (March 18, 1833 – December 31, 1893) was a justice of the Arkansas Supreme Court from 1871 to 1874, and a justice of the South Dakota Supreme Court from 1889 until his death.

Born in East Bethany, Genesee County, New York, Bennett was educated at Genesee Wesleyan Seminary of Lima, New York, graduating in 1852.

He moved to Illinois, where he was the first postmaster of Morrison, Illinois. At the breaking out of the American Civil War, he joined the Union Army and was elected as Lieutenant Colonel of the 75th Illinois Volunteer Infantry Regiment, and in December 1862, was promoted to Colonel and served throughout the war. After the war he served for some time as judge advocate in the regular army, and after Arkansas was reconstructed he was elected Judge of the First Circuit, in 1868. He was appointed to the first Board of Trustees of the Arkansas Industrial University, known now as the University of Arkansas, in 1871 and introduced the motion to name Fayetteville, Arkansas as its location. He was then elected as a justice of the Arkansas Supreme Court in 1871.

On May 2 or 3, 1872, Bennett and fellow judge E. J. Searle were arrested by a mob while traveling on a train through Argenta, Arkansas (a third judge, Marshall L. Stephenson, escaped). The mob claimed to be acting on orders from Governor Elisha Baxter, who disclaimed any knowledge of the matter. The following day, Bennett was able to dispatch a letter to Governor Baxter demanding to be released, and on May 7, an infantry detachment sent to the town secured the release of the two captive judges. Bennett continued on the court until his term expired in 1874, and then moved to Helena, Arkansas, where he engaged in the private practice of law.

In 1883, he moved to the Dakota Territory, locating at Clark, South Dakota and continued to practice of law. Bennett was a Mason, and was a charter member of Olivet Chapter, No. 28 at Clark, and served as its High Priest for three terms. He was elected to the South Dakota Supreme Court in 1889, taking office on October 15, 1889. In 1893 was re-elected, but died two days before his new term would begin.

Bennett died in Pierre, South Dakota, and was interred in Rose Hill Cemetery, in Clark, South Dakota. Competing accounts indicate that Bennett County, South Dakota is either named for Bennett, or for Granville G. Bennett, a prominent South Dakota politician.
