= Townsend Dickinson =

American judge (1795–1851)

Associate Justice of the Arkansas Supreme Court
- In office 1836–1842
- Nominated by: Arkansas General Assembly
- Preceded by: position established
- Succeeded by: George W. Pashal

Member of the Arkansas House of Representatives from the Independence County district
- In office September 12, 1836 – March 5, 1838 Serving with Charles H. Pelham

Delegate to 1836 Arkansas Constitutional Convention
- In office January 4, 1836 – January 30, 1836 Serving with John Ringgold
- Constituency: Independence County

Arkansas Territorial Council
- In office October 6, 1823 – October 31, 1823
- Preceded by: Peyton Tucker
- Succeeded by: J. Jeffry
- Constituency: Independence County

Personal details
- Born: 1795 Yonkers, New York
- Died: 1855 (aged 59–60) Texas
- Cause of death: Drowning
- Spouse: Mariah Moore (m. 1825; died 1836)

Townsend Dickinson (c. 1795 – February 1851) was a justice of the Arkansas Supreme Court from 1836 to 1842, serving as one of the first three members of the court.

Born in New York, Dickinson came to what would later be Arkansas Territory shortly after its acquisition by the United States, and settled at Batesville, Arkansas, in 1821. In 1823 he was elected to the territorial legislature, and was made by that body prosecuting attorney of his district. In 1833, he was made U.S. Land Office Registrar for Batesville. He was a delegate to the constitutional convention of 1836, and of the first state legislature, by which he was elected to the supreme bench that same year. After his term expired in 1842, he returned to practice in Batesville.

A judge Byers of Batesville relayed an anecdote which illustrates Dickinson's legal acumen:

Byers had sued a client of Dickinson's before a justice of the peace. After the jury was impanelled, Dickinson wanted to interpose a set-off. Byers read a decision of the supreme court, saying that after the impanelling of the jury the defendant could not insist upon putting in a set-off. Dickinson seized upon the word "insist", and said: "Of course, your honor, we cannot insist upon filing the setoff. If we insisted, your honor would fine us for contempt of court. We only ask you to allow us to do it, and we leave the matter entirely to you". Of course, the worthy justice allowed it to be filed.

Dickinson died from drowning in a lake in Corpus Christi, Texas, at about age 55. He and a companion were attempting to cross the lake in a buggy at night, and missed their road, ending up in deep water.

Political offices
| Preceded by Newly created seat | Justice of the Arkansas Supreme Court; 1836–1842 | Succeeded by George W. Paschal |
