= George C. Watkins =

American judge (1815–1872)

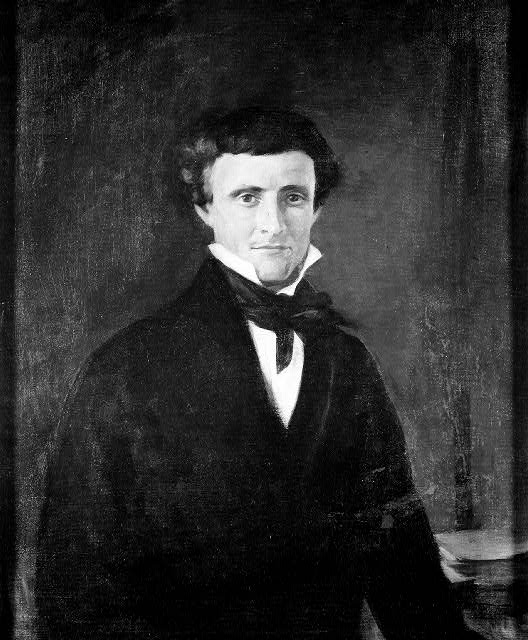
- A portrait of George C. Watkins

Chief Justice of the Arkansas Supreme Court
- In office 1853 – December 31, 1854
- Preceded by: Thomas Johnson
- Succeeded by: Resigned

2nd Attorney General of Arkansas
- In office October 1, 1848 – February 7, 1851
- Preceded by: Robert Ward Johnson
- Succeeded by: J. J. Clendenin

Personal details
- Born: November 25, 1815 Shelbyville, Kentucky, U.S.
- Died: December 7, 1872 (aged 57) St. Louis, Missouri, U.S.
- Resting place: Mount Holly Cemetery, Little Rock, Arkansas, U.S.
- Spouses: Mary Adams Crease (m. 1841–1855) Sophia Fulton Curran (m. 1855)
- Relatives: William Fulton (father in law); Robert A. Watkins Jr. (half-brother)
- Education: Litchfield Law School; Yale University
- Occupation: lawyer
- Profession: legal

George Claiborne Watkins (November 25, 1815 – December 7, 1872) was an Arkansas attorney who served as Arkansas Attorney General from 1848 to 1851, and as Chief Justice of the Arkansas Supreme Court from 1853 to 1854.

Born in Shelbyville, Kentucky and raised in Little Rock, Arkansas, Watkins studied law at Litchfield Law School in Connecticut, and at Yale University. Between 1837 and 1844, Watkins was in a law partnership with Chester Ashley, which ended when Ashley was elected to the United States Senate. Watkins was then in a law partnership with James Curran from 1844 until Curran's death in 1854. Watkins was Arkansas Attorney General from 1848 to 1851; "however, his primary focus continued to be his private practice". He was also a founder of the town of Des Arc, Arkansas on the Arkansas Grand Prairie. Watkins was succeeded as Attorney General of Arkansas by his brother-in-law, J. J. Clendenin.

The Arkansas General Assembly elected Watkins chief justice of the Arkansas Supreme Court, a position previously held by Thomas Johnson, his wife's older sister's husband. Watkins held the Chief Justice role from 1853 to 1854, during which time he did not practice law. Curran's death led Watkins to resign from his position, to take care of his law practice. Watkins, a widower, married Curran's widow.

In 1865, Watkins formed a partnership with U. M. Rose, which became the Rose Law Firm.
