= John R. Eakin =

American judge (1822–1885)

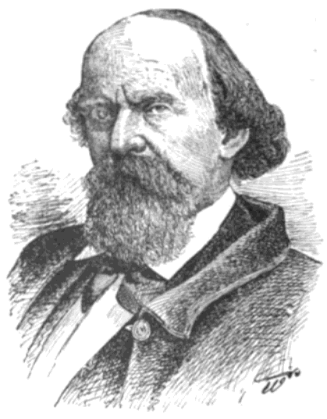
Eakin

John Rogers Eakin (February 14, 1822 – September 3, 1885) was a newspaper editor, state legislator, and justice of the Arkansas Supreme Court from 1878 to 1885. He advocated for women's rights.

Born in Shelbyville, Tennessee, Eakin became wealthy from an inheritance from his father. He conducted agricultural experiments and engaged in viticulture.

He published the Washington Telegraph in Washington, Arkansas, Hempstead County, Arkansas.

After the American Civil War, he served in the Arkansas House of Representatives, where he chaired the Judiciary Committee. He participated in the state's constitutional convention of 1874, and later that year was named chancery judge. He was appointed to the state supreme court in 1878, and continued serving there through declining health until his death. On the court, he was noted for writing several dissents favoring women's rights.

On July 31, 1848, Eakin married Elizabeth Erwin, a college-educated woman who influenced his views, and with whom he had several children. Elizabeth died in 1885, and Eakin died the same year at the home of one of his daughters in Marshall, Missouri, at the age of 63.

Political offices
Preceded by Jesse Turner	Justice of the Arkansas Supreme Court; 1878–1885	Succeeded by Burrill B. Battle
