= Elana Wills =

American judge

Associate Justice of the Arkansas Supreme Court
- In office October 1, 2008 – December 31, 2010
- Appointed by: Gov. Mike Beebe
- Preceded by: Tom Glaze
- Succeeded by: Courtney Hudson Goodson

Personal details
- Born: Elana Cunningham c. 1962 (age 63–64)
- Spouse: Jay Wills
- Children: 1
- Education: Arkansas State University; University of Arkansas School of Law

Elana Cunningham Wills (born c. 1962) is an Arkansas Supreme Court justice. Appointed in September 2008, she will serve on the Court until the end of December 2010. She was previously the state's Deputy Attorney General for Opinions.

== Early life ==
Wills was raised in Jonesboro, Arkansas.

== Education ==
Wills earned a bachelor's degree in business from Arkansas State University and a law degree from the University of Arkansas School of Law.

== Career ==
Wills has been in the Opinions Division of the Arkansas Attorney General's Office since 1988. Most recently, she had been the state's Deputy Attorney General for Opinions.

On September 2, 2008, she was appointed by Arkansas Governor Mike Beebe to fill a judgeship on the Arkansas Supreme Court following the retirement of Justice Tom Glaze. She was sworn into the office on October 1, 2008 and the term will expire on December 31, 2010. Among other cases she will address is what is probably the final proceeding in the Arkansas State Court system for the West Memphis Three.

== Personal life ==
Wills married Jay Wills, an attorney, in the early 1990s. They have one daughter, Grace.

== Awards ==
- Freedom of Information Award, Arkansas Press Association
