= Robert C. Knox =

American judge (1892–1947)

Robert Carl Knox (April 19, 1892 – December 8, 1947) was a justice of the Arkansas Supreme Court from 1943 to 1944.

Knox received an undergraduate degree from the University of Arkansas, and a J.D. from Harvard Law School, gaining admission to the bar in 1914. He entered the practice of law in Monticello, Arkansas, and over a 30-year legal career became known as an expert in oil litigation. In 1916, he was elected mayor of that city. The following year he was appointed to a seat on the county court for Drew County, Arkansas. In 1922 and 1924, Knox was elected to the Arkansas Senate, from Pulaski County, Arkansas. Knox later served as chairman of the Democratic State Committee, from which he resigned in January 1941.

On April 20, 1943, Governor Homer Martin Adkins appointed Knox to a seat on the state supreme court vacated by the death of Justice Ben Carter. In October of that year, Knox had a heart attack, but remained on the bench until the expiration of his term at the end of 1944. Knox continued to experience repercussions from his heart attack until his death, at Fort Smith Hospital in Fort Smith, Arkansas, at the age of 55.

Political offices
Preceded by Ben Carter	Justice of the Arkansas Supreme Court; 1943–1944	Succeeded by Minor W. Millwee
