= David Newbern =

American judge (born 1937)

William David Newbern (born May 28, 1937) was a justice of the Arkansas Supreme Court from 1985 to 1998.

== Education, military service, and teaching career ==
Born in Oklahoma City, Oklahoma, he studied history and law at the University of Arkansas (UA) in Fayetteville and Vanderbilt University in Nashville, Tennessee. He received an undergraduate law degree from UA in 1959 and a juris doctor degree from UA in 1961.

He joined the Judge Advocate General of the United States Army, "mostly at the Pentagon in Washington DC and in Boston, Massachusetts, but also in Germany and South Korea". During this time, he received an LL.M. from the George Washington University Law School, and a master's degree in international relations from the Fletcher School at Tufts University.

Following his military service, he "taught law at UA [and] was acting dean of the law school for a period in 1972–73". Returning to his professorial role, he chaired the faculty appointments committee from 1974 to 1975, where he oversaw the hiring of Bill Clinton to the law school faculty. An amateur musician, Newbern also served as the first administrator of the Ozark Folk Center at Mountain View.

== Judicial service ==
After Clinton was elected governor of the state, Newbern successfully sought appointment to one of the six temporary seats on the newly established intermediate court of appeal. Newbern unsuccessfully ran for a seat on the circuit court for Washington County in 1982, but in 1984 was elected to a vacant seat on the state supreme court. Due to ethical rules prohibiting judicial candidates from campaigning on legal issues, Newbern "took his guitar and sang folk songs at political rallies", and "refused the demand of his runoff opponent that they debate the death penalty, pornography, school consolidation, and other potential controversial issues before the court".

As a justice, Newbern "brought an academic manner to the court's internal proceedings, sometimes bringing a flip chart to the court's weekly conference to lay out the issues in a case". He retired from the court in 1998 to pursue his musical interests, though he occasionally accepted special assignments from the court to review matters.

== Personal life ==
Newbern married Barbara Rigsby, with whom he had a daughter while stationed at Frankfurt, Germany. Newbern and his first wife divorced in 1968.

Newbern then married Carolyn Lewis, with whom he moved to her hometown of Fayetteville, Arkansas, in 1970. They also had one daughter.

He was interviewed in 2012, as part of a project of the Arkansas Supreme Court Historical Society.

Political offices
Preceded by P. A. "Les" Hollingsworth	Justice of the Arkansas Supreme Court; 1985–1998	Succeeded by Lavenski Smith
