= John McClure (judge) =

American judge

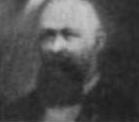

Chief Justice of the Arkansas Supreme Court
- In office 1871–1874
- Preceded by: William W. Wilshire
- Succeeded by: new constitution

Associate Justice of the Arkansas Supreme Court
- In office 1868–1871
- Preceded by: position created
- Succeeded by: Elhanan J. Searle

Delegate to 1868 Arkansas Constitutional Convention
- In office January 7, 1868 – February 11, 1868 Serving with John N. Hutchinson
- Constituency: Arkansas County

Personal details
- Born: May 4, 1834 Zanesville, Ohio
- Died: July 7, 1915 (aged 81)
- Resting place: Little Rock National Cemetery
- Party: Republican
- Spouse: Rumina Ayres
- Occupation: Lawyer

Military service
- Allegiance: United States
- Branch/service: Union Army
- Years of service: 1861-1865
- Rank: Lieutenant colonel
- Unit: 57th Ohio Infantry
- Battles/wars: Civil War

John E. McClure (May 4, 1834 – July 7, 1915), nicknamed Poker Jack, was a politician and judge in Arkansas during Reconstruction. He was originally a lawyer from Ohio.

== Biography ==
McClure was part of Powell Clayton's inner circle. A Republican "carpetbagger", he arrived in the capital city of Little Rock as the Lieutenant Colonel of an African-American regiment in the United States Army. Dismissed from the Army for playing cards, he gained the nickname, "Poker Jack," from the Democrats.

=== Freedmens Bureau ===
After the American Civil War ended, he rented a cotton farm and later became an agent of the Freedmens Bureau for Arkansas County in eastern Arkansas. McClure was elected alongside John N. Hutchinson to represent Arkansas County at the 1868 Arkansas Constitutional Convention.

=== Arkansas Supreme Court ===
In 1868, he was appointed to the Arkansas Supreme Court and served until 1871. When Clayton was impeached in 1870, McClure issued an injunction preventing Clayton's lieutenant governor James M. Johnson from taking office. As a result of this action, McClure was also impeached and only narrowly avoided removal from office.
