= John J. Clendenin =

American judge (1813–1876)

John J. Clendenin (September 2, 1813 – July 4, 1876) was a justice of the Arkansas Supreme Court from 1866 to 1868.

He was born in Harrisburg, Pennsylvania. He worked at a post office and studied law under George M. Dallas. He also clerked for Simon Cameron.

From 1851 to 1856 he served as Attorney General of Arkansas (ex officio) and then returned to a position as a circuit judge.

Political offices
Preceded by Freeman W. Compton	Justice of the Arkansas Supreme Court; 1866–1868	Succeeded by Thomas M. Bowen
