= Augustus H. Garland =

American lawyer and politician

Augustus Garland
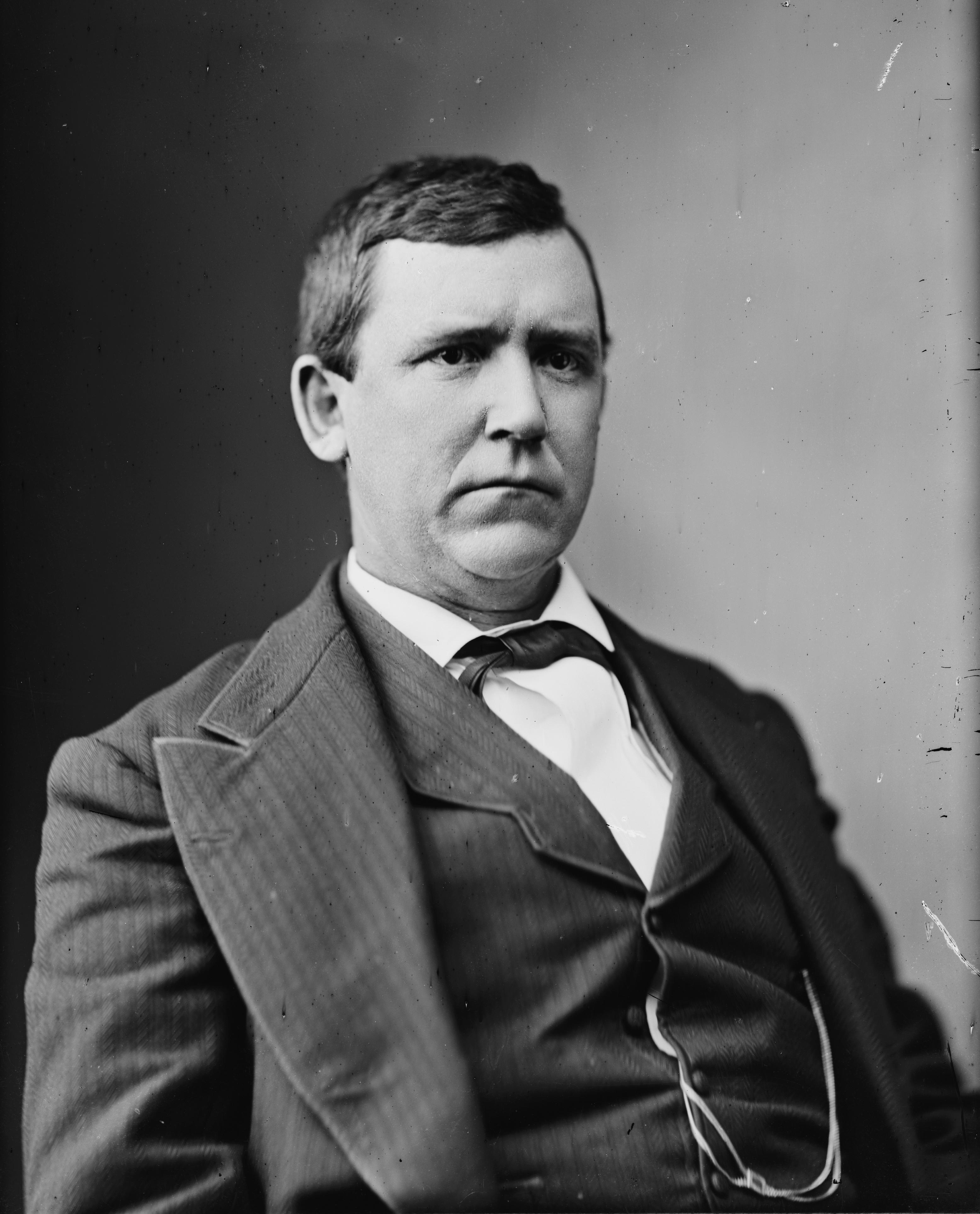

38th United States Attorney General
- In office March 6, 1885 – March 4, 1889
- President: Grover Cleveland
- Preceded by: Benjamin H. Brewster
- Succeeded by: William H. H. Miller

United States Senator from Arkansas
- In office March 4, 1877 – March 6, 1885
- Preceded by: Powell Clayton
- Succeeded by: James Henderson Berry

11th Governor of Arkansas
- In office November 12, 1874 – January 11, 1877
- Preceded by: Elisha Baxter
- Succeeded by: William Read Miller

Confederate States Senator from Arkansas
- In office November 8, 1864 – May 10, 1865
- Preceded by: Charles B. Mitchel
- Succeeded by: Constituency abolished

Member of the Confederate House of Representatives from Arkansas's 3rd district
- In office February 18, 1862 – November 8, 1864
- Preceded by: Constituency established
- Succeeded by: David Carroll

Delegate to the Confederate States Provisional Congress from Arkansas
- In office May 18, 1861 – February 17, 1862
- Preceded by: Constituency established
- Succeeded by: Constituency abolished

Personal details
- Born: Augustus Hill Garland; June 11, 1832 Covington, Tennessee, U.S.
- Died: January 26, 1899 (aged 66) Washington, D.C., U.S.
- Resting place: Mount Holly Cemetery
- Party: Democratic (1860–1899)
- Other political affiliations: Whig (before 1855); American (1855–1859); Constitutional Union (1859–1860)
- Spouse: Sarah Virginia Sanders (m. 1853; died 1877)
- Children: 9
- Education: St. Mary's College, Kentucky; St. Joseph's College, Kentucky (BA)

Augustus Hill Garland (June 11, 1832 – January 26, 1899) was an American lawyer and Democratic Party politician from Arkansas, who initially opposed Arkansas' secession from the United States, but served in both houses of the Congress of the Confederate States and the United States Senate before becoming the 11th governor of Arkansas (1874–1877) and the 38th attorney general of the United States (1885–1889).

== Early life ==
Garland was born in Covington, Tennessee on June 11, 1832, to Rufus and Barbara (née Hill) Garland. In 1830 his father owned 13 slaves, and owned a store. Following a drunken fight in which Rufus stabbed a man, the family moved to Lost Prairie in Lafayette County, Arkansas along the Red River when Augustus was one. Later that year, Rufus died, forcing Barbara and Augustus to relocate to Spring Hill, Arkansas, where she met Thomas Hubbard. In 1836, Barbara married Hubbard, a local lawyer, judge, and political candidate who owned five slaves in the 1850 census.

Garland attended Spring Hill Male Academy from 1838 to 1843. Hubbard moved the family to Washington, Arkansas, the Hempstead county seat, in 1844. He attended St. Mary's College in Lebanon, Kentucky, and graduated from St. Joseph's College in Bardstown, Kentucky, in 1849. After school, Garland returned to Arkansas and initially taught at Brownstown School in Mine Creek, Sevier County, but returned to Washington to study law with Hempstead County clerk Simon Sanders. He married Sarah Virginia Sanders on June 14, 1853; they would have nine children, four of whom survived to adulthood.

== Early legal career ==
Admitted to the bar in 1853, Garland started his law practice with his stepfather. Garland moved to Little Rock in June 1856, and became a law partner to Ebenezer Cummins, a former associate of Albert Pike. When Cummins died, Garland took over his extensive practice at age 25 and took on slightly younger attorney William Randolph by 1860, who lived with Garland's young family.

Garland owned three enslaved females in the 1860 census (two 27 years old and an 11-year-old girl), and his elder brother Rufus Garland Jr. owned 9 slaves in Hempstead County, Arkansas. Nonetheless, Augustus Garland represented the slave Abby Guy in two appeals to the Arkansas Supreme Court in 1857 and 1861, ultimately winning her freedom.

Garland became one of Arkansas's most prominent attorneys and was admitted to the bar of the Supreme Court of the United States in 1860 with the assistance of Reverdy Johnson.

== Entry into politics ==
Garland supported the Whig and American "Know Nothing" parties during the 1850s. Local Whigs sought Garland to run for county treasurer prior to starting his legal career, but he declined. However, Garland remained active in politics. He gave speeches for Democrat Edward A. Warren during the 1856 election for the Arkansas 2nd.

In the election of 1860, Garland was a presidential elector in the Arkansas Electoral College for the Constitutional Union Party voting for the party's nominees of John Bell and Edward Everett.

== American Civil War ==
The election of Republican Abraham Lincoln to the Presidency of the United States led to the secession of the Deep South states from the Union. Garland consistently opposed secession and advocated Arkansas's continued allegiance to the United States. His elder brother Rufus raised a Confederate infantry company (the "Hempstead Hornets") and accepted a captain's commission. Augustus Garland was selected to represent Pulaski County at the 1861 secession convention in Little Rock, where he voiced his opposition. After Lincoln called for 75,000 troops from Arkansas to help suppress the Confederate States, Garland gave his support to secession.

=== Confederate States Congress ===
Four days after approving the secession ordinance, the convention delegates appointed Garland to the Provisional Confederate Congress, where he was the youngest member of the body. Garland was elected to the Confederate House of Representatives over Jilson P. Johnson in the 1st Confederate States Congress in 1861, where he was a member of the Committees on Public Lands, Commerce and Financial Independence, and the Judiciary. In 1862, Garland was narrowly defeated by Robert W. Johnson, who had been the incumbent in the United States Senate, for a seat in the Confederate States Senate, with the twelfth ballot going 46-42.

He was reelected to the Confederate House of Representatives in 1863, where he was now serving alongside his brother Rufus. In 1864 was appointed to the Confederate States Senate to fill the vacancy caused by the death of Charles B. Mitchel in a close vote against Albert Pike. As a Congressman, he made efforts to establish a Supreme Court of the Confederate States and supported President Jefferson Davis, with the exception of Davis' aside suspending the writ of habeas corpus for the duration of the war (as had Lincoln in the North). He returned to Arkansas in February 1865, when it was clear the Confederacy was about to lose so that he could help facilitate the transition of power from exiled Confederate governor Harris Flanagin to Isaac Murphy with General Joseph J. Reynolds, and the return of his state to the Union.

== Postwar ==
=== Ex parte Garland ===
Not long after the Civil War ended, President Andrew Johnson pardoned Garland on July 15, 1865. He was nonetheless forbidden to resume his legal practice without taking the Ironclad Oath, which the United States Congress had required of all Confederate government or military officials, per a law passed on January 24, 1865. In Ex parte Garland, Garland argued that the law was unconstitutional and ex post facto. On January 14, 1867, by a vote of five to four, the U.S. Supreme Court agreed. The ruling caused considerable uproar in the north, but former Confederates hoped that the judicial system could be used to prevent the implementation of Congressional Reconstruction.

=== Political career ===
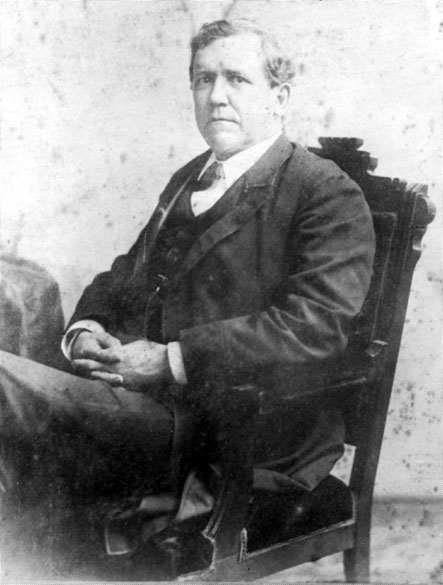
Augustus H. Garland (c. 1870)

Arkansas legislators elected him to the United States Senate for a term beginning in 1867 but was not allowed to take the seat because Arkansas had not yet been readmitted to the Union. Garland knew the election was "a doubtful, if not an empty offer". While in Washington DC attempting to be seated in the Senate, Garland worked behind the scenes to push the Supreme Court to hear the case of Mississippi v. Johnson which challenged the constitutionality of the Reconstruction Acts; however, the Court refused.

Garland had established himself as a key player in Arkansas politics, a strong conservative capable of working with the federal government, and widely recognized as a sharp legal mind. However, Garland was most noted by contemporaries for strong advantages he held in the political sphere: pragmatic, plain-spoken, and informal, yet brilliant and well-networked with national political figures from around the country. In the immediate aftermath of the Civil War, Garland recognized the changing political winds and withdrew from public participation in politics during early Reconstruction. Between 1868 and 1872, as he resumed his legal practice, Garland observed politics from a distance and used his influence behind the scenes, only rising to speak against the 1868 Arkansas Constitution. Following ratification of the new constitution in April 1868, Democrats were faced with the choice to take a "voter's oath" or be ineligible for state office. Garland and others worked within the Democratic Party of Arkansas to make the choice to take the oath and fight the Republicans at the ballot box in November 1868. Garland in 1869 helped found the Southern Historical Society and gathered papers of Arkansas Confederate veterans. He worked to repay debts incurred from Ex parte Garland, which cost him $1,760 ($38,700 in today's dollars) and $750 from time in Washington ($17,300 in today's dollars), all while fielding questions about his inactivity in the public sphere. During this time, he partnered in his law practice for several years with Sterling R. Cockrill, who would later become Chief Justice of the Arkansas Supreme Court.

In 1872, with the Republican Party split into three factions, Arkansas Democrats sought Garland to help elect Democrats into the state legislature and had been considered for the Democratic nomination for the U.S. Senate. While he was willing to help fight Congressional Reconstruction and Republican rule in Arkansas, Garland sought to avoid engaging in "fruitless" political efforts while his personal finances recovered. He declined seeking the 1872 gubernatorial nomination given the low annual salary ($2500, or $67,200 in today's dollars) and that the position was viewed to be below his political stature.

During the conflict known as the Brooks-Baxter War, Garland became a primary strategist for Governor Elisha Baxter and served as deputy secretary of state. Though Baxter and Joseph Brooks were both Republicans, Baxter was more sympathetic to the Redeemers, unreconstructed Democrats and Confederate veterans seeking to repudiate the Radical Republicans. After Baxter was evicted from the Old State House on April 15, 1874, Baxter went with U. M. Rose, Henry C. Caldwell, Freeman W. Compton, and others to visit Garland at his home at 1404 Scott Street around midnight to strategize a return to power. The following day, Baxter declared martial law in Pulaski County and gave an address to the people urging a rally at the capitol. Garland organized, as president of the Little Rock Bar, a resolution of many prominent attorneys condemning Judge Whytock's order that elevated Brooks to the governor's mansion. Garland took up residence at Anthony House for the next three weeks to help manage the Baxter effort. Garland's plan to engage President of the United States Ulysses S. Grant to call for a special meeting of the newly-Democratic Arkansas General Assembly to resolve the matter led to a win for Baxter, who recommended a state constitutional convention in 1874. Garland read the proclamation from Grant endorsing the General Assembly's restoration of Baxter to a throng in front of the Anthony House to applause. Baxter began re-appointing officeholders from pre-Civil War and the Confederate government; a political realignment had taken place, ending Reconstruction in Arkansas and returning the state to Democratic control.

Following the drafting of a new constitution, an election was held for voters to ratify the new constitution and elect a slate of officers to serve under it, if approved. At the three-day Democratic state convention beginning September 8, 1874, Baxter was twice nominated as gubernatorial candidate but refused to accept both times. Garland was nominated by a unanimous vote over various favorite son nominees, which were withdrawn. Republicans did not nominate candidates in protest, believing the election was illegal and appealing to the United States Congress to declare the 1868 constitution the law of the land. The new constitution was ratified on October 13, 1874 and Garland received almost unanimous support to become Arkansas's 11th governor.

=== Governor of Arkansas ===
Garland was faced with a number of problems after taking office as Governor including turmoil in the state over threatening groups like the Ku Klux Klan, an ongoing congressional investigation over the Brooks-Baxter conflict and the state debt of $17,000,000. With help from the finance board, the debt was significantly lowered in two years time. Garland was a strong supporter of better education. He urged the legislature to establish schools for the blind and deaf, successfully advocated in appointing a new president for the Arkansas Industrial University, today the University of Arkansas, and helped found the Branch Normal College, today the University of Arkansas at Pine Bluff, which made education more accessible for African-Americans. Under his administration, he also oversaw the creation of the Arkansas Bureau of Statistics and the Arkansas Bureau of Agriculture, Mining and Manufacturing.

=== United States Senate ===
Garland ran successfully for the United States Senate in 1876, thus succeeded Republican Powell Clayton. Voters re-elected him in 1883. In the Senate, he served as a member of the Committees on Public Lands, the Territories and the Judiciary, serving as chairman of the Territories Committee in the 46th Congress. As a Senator, he made efforts to bring about tariff reform, internal improvements, as well as the regulation of interstate commerce and a federal prison system, federal aid to education and civil service reform.

=== Attorney General of the United States ===
Garland resigned from the Senate in 1885 after accepting the appointment of Attorney General of the United States by newly elected President Grover Cleveland, becoming the first Arkansan to receive a cabinet post.

Not long after taking office, Garland became embroiled in a political scandal. While serving in the Senate, Garland became a shareholder in and attorney for the Pan-Electric Telephone Company which was organized to form regional telephone companies using equipment developed by J. Harris Rogers. The Bell Telephone Company brought suit against Pan-Electric for patent infringement after it was discovered that their equipment was similar to that of Bell's. Garland was ordered to bring a suit in the name of the United States to invalidate the Bell patent, breaking their monopoly of telephone technology, but refused to do so. However, while Garland was on vacation in the summer, Solicitor General John Goode authorized the suit.

A year-long congressional investigation and constant public attention affected his work as Attorney General, however, despite having to serve under a cloud of suspicion, he was supported by President Cleveland. Garland was also the first, and to date only, United States cabinet secretary to be censured by Congress when, in 1886, Garland failed to provide documents about the firing of a United States Attorney.

== Later life and death ==
President Cleveland lost reelection to Benjamin Harrison in the 1888 election and Garland left office at the end of Cleveland's term in 1889. He resumed practicing law in Washington, D.C., and published a number of books, including The Constitution As It Is (1880), Experience in the Supreme Court of the United States, with Some Reflections and Suggestions as to that Tribunal (1883), Third-Term Presidential (1896), Experience in the Supreme Court of the United States (1898) and Treatise on the Constitution and Jurisdiction of the United States Courts (1898). On January 26, 1899, while arguing a case before the Supreme Court, Garland suffered a stroke and died a few hours later in the Capitol. He was interred at Mount Holly Cemetery in Little Rock, Arkansas.

== Legacy ==
The following locations were named after Garland:

- Garland County, Arkansas
- Garland, North Carolina
- Garland, Texas

== See also ==
- List of Confederate States senators
- List of governors of Arkansas
- List of people from Tennessee
- List of people pardoned or granted clemency by the president of the United States
- List of United States senators from Arkansas

Confederate States House of Representatives
New constituency	Delegate to the C.S. Provisional Congress from Arkansas; 1861–1862; Served alongside: Robert Johnson, Albert Rust, Hugh Thomason, William Watkins	Constituency abolished
New constituency	Member of the C.S. House of Representatives from Arkansas's 3rd district 1862–1864	Succeeded by David Carroll
Confederate States Senate
Preceded by Charles B. Mitchel	C.S. Senator (Class 3) from Arkansas; 1864–1865; Served alongside: Robert Johnson	Constituency abolished
Party political offices
Vacant Title last held by Richard H. Johnson	Democratic nominee for Governor of Arkansas; 1874	Succeeded by William Miller
Political offices
Preceded by Elisha Baxter	Governor of Arkansas; 1874–1877	Succeeded by William Miller
U.S. Senate
Preceded by Powell Clayton	U.S. Senator (Class 2) from Arkansas; 1877–1885; Served alongside: Stephen Wallace Dorsey, James D. Walker, James Kimbrough Jones	Succeeded by James Henderson Berry
Legal offices
Preceded by Benjamin H. Brewster	Attorney General of the United States; 1885–1889	Succeeded by William H. H. Miller
