= Garland Elementary School =

- U.S. National Register of Historic Places
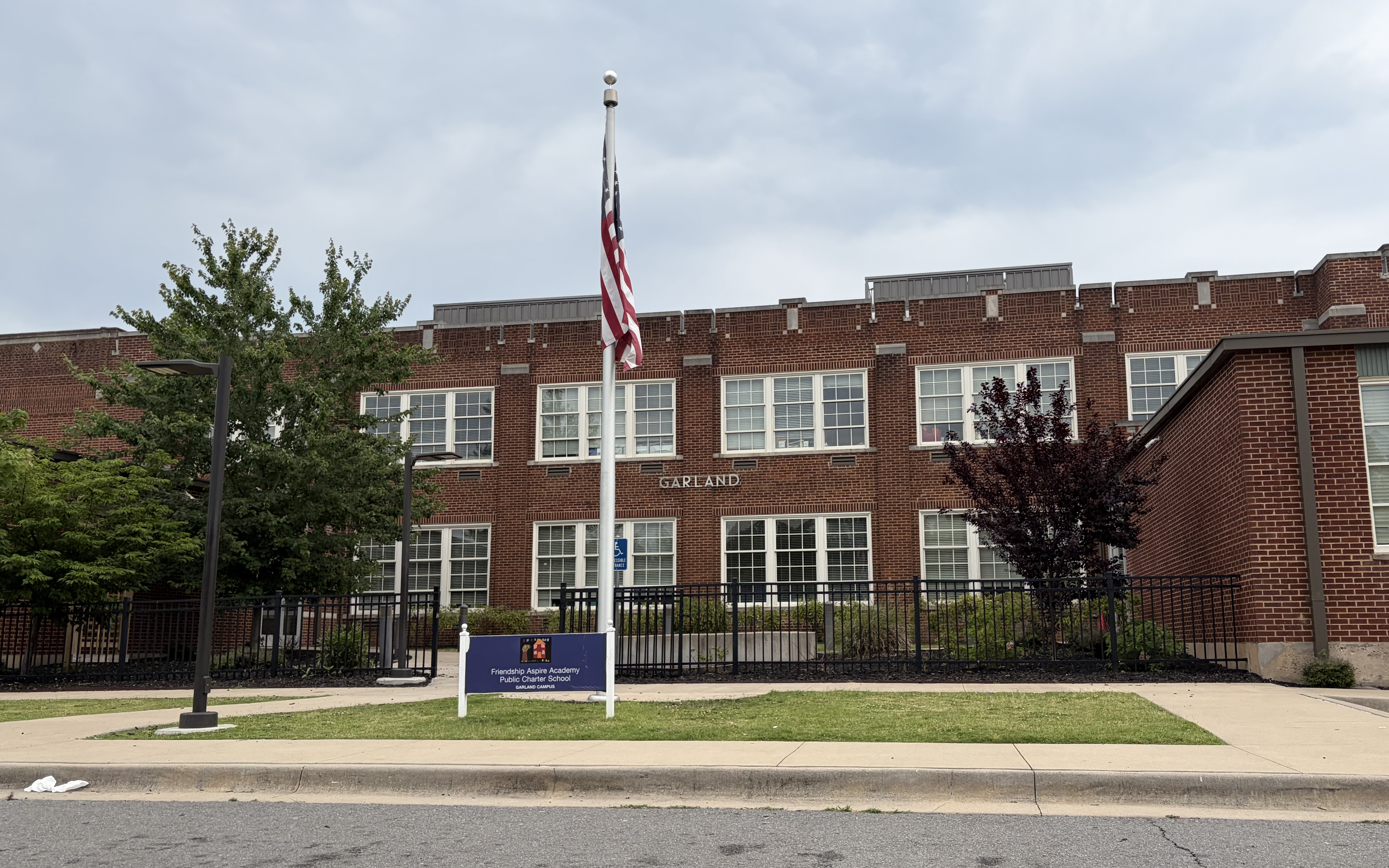
- The former Garland Elementary, now Friendship Aspire Academy Middle School, in 2026

- Location within Arkansas Location within the United States
- Location: 3615 W. 25th St., Little Rock, Arkansas
- Coordinates: 34°43′43″N 92°18′52″W
- Area: 2.9 acres (1.2 ha)
- Built: 1924
- Architectural style: Classical Revival; Collegiate Gothic
- NRHP reference No.: 100003015
- Added to NRHP: October 16, 2018

The Garland Elementary School is a historic former school building at 3615 West 25th Street in Little Rock, Arkansas. It is a square two-story masonry structure, finished in red brick with stone trim. Some of its original Gothic entrances have been obscured by later additions. The school was built in 1924, with additions in 1938 and 1954, and was originally built to serve the local white student population. It was named for Augustus H. Garland, a local politician. The school was fully integrated in 1973, and closed in 2001.

The building was listed on the National Register of Historic Places in 2018.

== See also ==
- National Register of Historic Places listings in Little Rock, Arkansas
