= C. W. Tankersley =

Charles W. Tankersley was a state legislator in Arkansas. He served as Speaker of the Arkansas House of Representatives. He was re-elected to the position in the 19th Legislature.

While speaker he was put in charge of the state penitentiary until a leader was elected.

In closing a session of the assembly he expressed regret over "political vicissitudes" and hoped that "much that has been done will sleep among the things of the past, to be resurrected nevermore."

An 1872 land record exists in his name.

James H. Berry replaced him as Speaker Pro Tempore during a special session called by governor Elisha Baxter during the Brooks Baxter War in 1874 and the following session when Tankersley refused to attend.
