= 1874 Arkansas elections =

Arkansas held a general election on October 13, 1874. The vote resulted in approval of a new Constitution of Arkansas and complete political realignment in the state to the Democratic Party, marking the end of the Reconstruction era in Arkansas.

== Setting ==
The vote took place as a midterm election during President Ulysses S. Grant's second term. As the Panic of 1873 and subsequent Long Depression, as well as executive branch scandals, began occupying the federal government and northerners, they withdrew from active involvement in Congressional Reconstruction. Grant's Amnesty Act allowed a coalition of reconstructed Democrats known as the redeemers to return to political power, some of which would use harassment, intimidation, and violence against black people and Republicans to ensure desired political outcomes.

The Brooks–Baxter War, having recently been resolved by Grant in favor of Governor of Arkansas Elisha Baxter (nominally a Republican), resulted in a call for the 1874 Arkansas Constitutional Convention. Largely drafted by Democrats and former Confederates, the new draft constitution was submitted to the voters of Arkansas on October 13. This constitution removed many unpopular provisions of the 1868 Constitution of Arkansas that had enabled Republican rule during Reconstruction: it reduced the power of the executive branch in Arkansas, delegated many powers to county government, limited state and local tax rates, and reduced gubernatorial terms from 4 to 2 years.

== Democratic Convention ==
The Democratic Party state convention took place in Little Rock on September 8–10, 1874, seeking to nominate a slate of candidates that would serve under the new constitution, if ratified.

Governor Baxter had won the 1872 gubernatorial election, and under the 1868 Constitution was serving a four-year gubernatorial term. Given the new constitution was reducing the gubernatorial term to two years, it was decided a new gubernatorial candidate be selected who would serve under the new constitution, if ratified. Party loyalty, sectional concerns and party unity were all discussed.

Baxter was a Republican but had become a hero for helping overthrow Republican rule and restoring ex-Confederates and Democrats to power in the state. Democrats felt an obligation to allow him to "finish his term", which would have ended in 1876, for successfully opposing the Radical Republican elements of his own party. They also considered the appearance of not selecting Baxter upon the United States House of Representatives' Poland Committee, which had not yet delivered a report on the state government situation in Arkansas following the Brooks-Baxter War.

Delegates from the northwest part of the state suggested David Walker, a former territorial and state legislator, Confederate military judge, and state supreme court justice from Fayetteville. But Walker was defeated in his pursuit to represent Washington County in the recent constitutional convention, which was taken by others as a sign his influence was waning. Many from the northwest part of the state strongly opposed nomination of Baxter to continue as governor.

Former governor and Confederate Army colonel Harris Flanagin was also considered to have a high stature in the state.

The typical convention rule requiring two-thirds for choosing a gubernatorial nominee was replaced by a simple majority over the objections of the northwestern delegates. Governor Elisha Baxter was selected as gubernatorial nominee on the first ballot, receiving 52 of 72 votes. Baxter declined "under the peculiar circumstances which exist", but was renominated a second time, now by acclamation. After a second Baxter refusal, the committee closed shortly after someone calling for August Garland received applause.

The following day, Garland was selected unanimously, following withdrawal of several favorite son nominations. Garland was seen as a candidate capable of unifying northwestern Whig and conservative Democrats alongside Little Rock and Southwest Arkansas Democrats familiar with Garland's leadership. Walker was selected as an associate justice on the supreme court as part of a ticket that carefully balanced sectional concerns among the northwest, central, and southeast parts of the state. Garland was a reluctant candidate, having refused the nomination in 1872 as below his stature, but accepted.

The remainder of the ticket included: Simon P. Hughes for attorney general, Benton B. Beavers for secretary of state, William R. Miller for auditor, Thomas J. Churchill for treasurer, J. N. Smithee for land commissioner, Elbert H. English for Chief Justice of the Arkansas Supreme Court, and David Walker and William M. Harrison for Supreme Court associate justices.

== State ==
=== Constitutional offices ===
==== Lieutenant governor ====
The position of lieutenant governor was abolished by the 1874 Arkansas Constitution.

==== Attorney general ====
Simon P. Hughes won election as Arkansas Attorney General unopposed.

==== Secretary of State ====
Benton B. Beavers won election as Arkansas Secretary of State unopposed.

==== Auditor ====
William R. Miller won election as Arkansas State Auditor unopposed. He had held the office from 1857 to 1860, 1861 to 1864, and from 1866 to 1868.

==== Treasurer ====
Thomas J. Churchill won election as Arkansas State Treasurer unopposed.

==== State Land Commissioner ====
J. N. Smithee won election as Arkansas State Land Commissioner unopposed. Smithee was the first commissioner elected to the position after it became a constitutional office under the 1874 Constitution of Arkansas, which was adopted during the same election.

== Supreme Court ==
=== Chief justice ===
Elbert H. English won election as Chief Justice of the Arkansas Supreme Court unopposed.

=== Associate justices ===
David Walker and William M. Harrison were elected as the two associate justices on the Arkansas Supreme Court.
