= James H. Berry =

Politician from Arkansas, United States

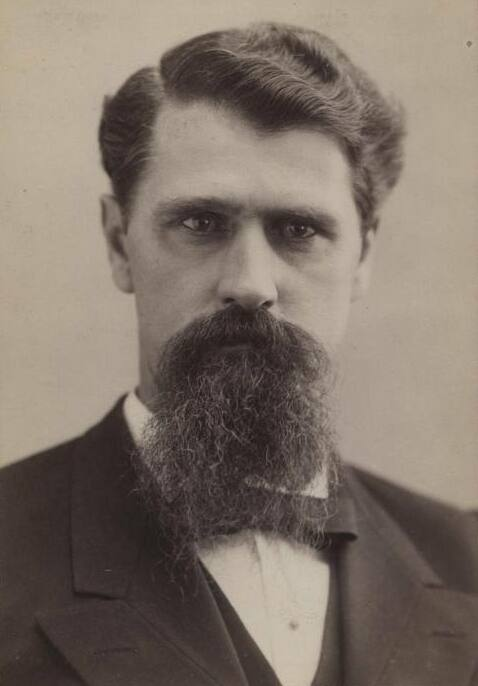

14th Governor of Arkansas
- In office January 13, 1883 – January 17, 1885
- Preceded by: Thomas James Churchill
- Succeeded by: Simon Pollard Hughes, Jr.

United States Senator from Arkansas
- In office March 20, 1885 – March 3, 1907
- Preceded by: Augustus H. Garland
- Succeeded by: Jeff Davis

Speaker of the Arkansas House of Representatives
- In office 1873
- Preceded by: Charles W. Tankersley
- Succeeded by: A. A. Pennington

Member of the Arkansas House of Representatives
- In office 1866–1874

Personal details
- Born: James Henderson Berry; May 15, 1841 Jackson County, Alabama, U.S.
- Died: January 30, 1913 (aged 71) Bentonville, Arkansas, U.S.
- Party: Democratic
- Profession: Lawyer

Military service
- Allegiance: Confederate States
- Branch/service: Confederate States Army
- Years of service: 1861–1863
- Rank: Second Lieutenant
- Unit: Company E, 16th Arkansas Infantry
- Battles/wars: American Civil War: Battle of Corinth (WIA) (POW)

James Henderson Berry (May 15, 1841 – January 30, 1913) was a United States senator and served as the 14th governor of Arkansas. He also served as Speaker of the Arkansas House of Representatives.

== Early life ==
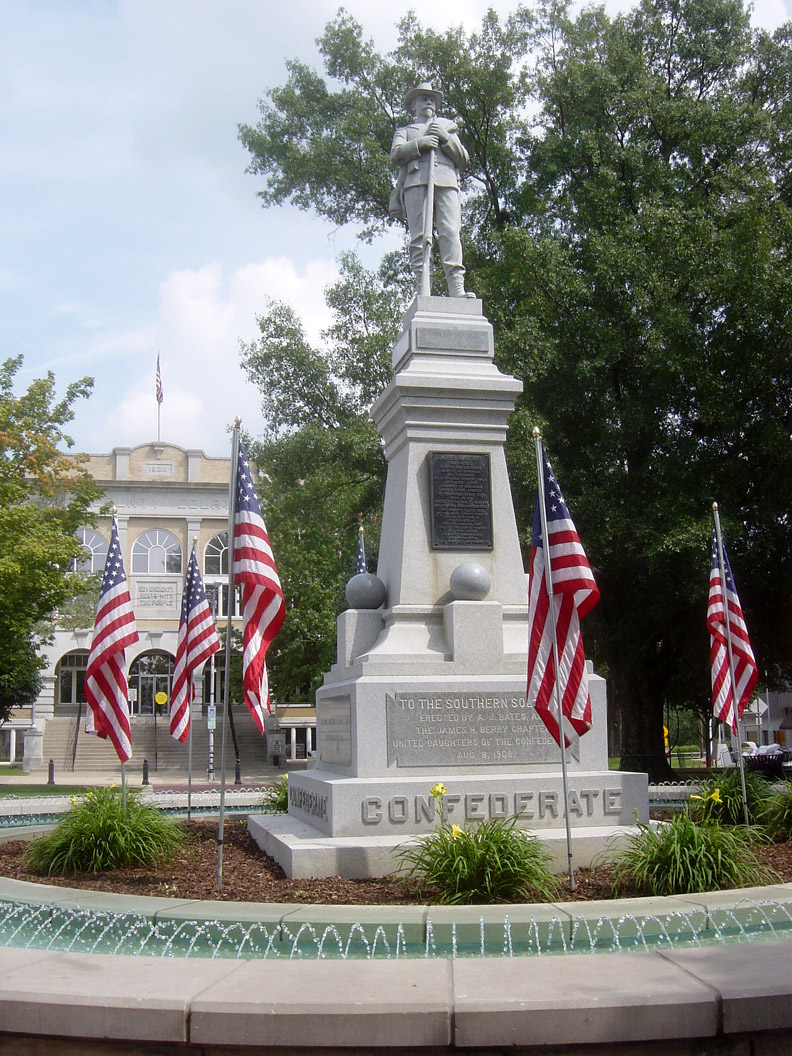
A 1908 monument in homage to James H. Berry and the Southern Soldier, located in the town square of Bentonville, Arkansas

James Henderson Berry was born in Jackson County, Alabama, to Isabella Jane (née Orr) and James McFerrin Berry. The family moved to Arkansas in 1848. Berry attended Berryville Academy in Berryville, Arkansas, for one year. The academy was named after his family. Berry studied law and in 1866 was admitted to the Arkansas bar.

== American Civil War ==
At the outbreak of the American Civil War, Berry joined the Confederate States Army and was commissioned as a second lieutenant with Company E, 16th Arkansas Infantry. Berry lost his right leg during the Battle of Corinth in northern Mississippi. After recuperating from his wound, he worked as a school teacher and started a private law practice.

== Political career ==
Berry was elected to the Arkansas House of Representatives in 1866. He was reelected in 1872 and in 1874. In his last term he was selected to be Speaker of the House after holding the position during the Brooks–Baxter War in place of Charles W. Tankersley. Berry was the chairman of the Democratic State Convention in 1876. In 1878 he became a judge for the Fourth Circuit Court and served in that post until 1882 when he was elected Governor of Arkansas. The Berry administration focused on reducing the state debt and creating a state mental hospital. Berry did not run for reelection. In March 1885, Berry was selected by the legislature to fill the unexpired term of Senator Augustus H. Garland. Berry remained in the U.S. Senate for the next 22 years.

== Later life ==
In 1910, Berry accepted a position with the Arkansas History Commission to mark the graves of all Arkansas Confederate soldiers who had died in northern prisons. Berry died in Bentonville, Arkansas, and is buried at the Knights of Pythias Cemetery (present-day Bentonville Cemetery), Bentonville, Arkansas.

== Personal life ==
In 1865, Berry married E.Q. "Lizzie" Quaile. They had six children.

Party political offices
Preceded by Thomas James Churchill	Democratic nominee for Governor of Arkansas; 1882	Succeeded by Simon Pollard Hughes Jr.
Political offices
Preceded by Thomas James Churchill	Governor of Arkansas; 1883–1885	Succeeded by Simon Pollard Hughes, Jr.
U.S. Senate
Preceded by Augustus H. Garland	U.S. senator (Class 2) from Arkansas; 1885–1907; Served alongside: James K. Jones, James P. Clarke	Succeeded by Jeff Davis
