= Hercules King Cannon White =

American soldier (1845–1907)

- Born: April 4, 1845; Louisville, Kentucky, U.S.
- Died: 1907
- Military career
- Allegiance: Confederate States of America
- Branch: Confederate States Army
- Unit: 2nd Kentucky Infantry
- Conflicts: Morgan's Raid; Brooks-Baxter War
- Other work: Attorney; prosecuting attorney, Tenth Judicial District; mayor of Pine Bluff, Arkansas

Hercules King Cannon White (April 4, 1845 – 1907) was an American Civil War soldier, guerrilla participant, and six-term mayor of Pine Bluff, Arkansas.

== Early life ==
He was born in Louisville, Kentucky, as the fifth of nine children to James M. White and Dorcas Trimble White.

== Civil War ==
White enlisted in Company E of the 2nd Kentucky Infantry of the Confederate States Army during the Civil War. Subsequently, he joined the cavalry under the command of John Hunt Morgan, surviving Morgan's Raid into southern Indiana.

== Career ==
Post-Civil War, White moved to Pine Bluff, Arkansas, where he established himself as an attorney in 1868. Acting Governor Ozra Hadley appointed White as prosecuting attorney for the Tenth Judicial District on April 20, 1871, a role he held until the restructuring of districts under Act 53 of 1873 prompted the appointment of a successor by Governor Elisha Baxter.

=== Brooks-Baxter War ===
During the Brooks-Baxter War, a notable episode during the Reconstruction era in Arkansas, White aligned himself with Governor Baxter. During the election dispute with Joseph Brooks, White raised three companies comprising African-American troops, arriving in Little Rock on April 18, 1874, and parading through the streets. At Baxter's request, White and his forces returned to Pine Bluff. The Brooks-Baxter War persisted, leading White to receive intelligence on April 30, 1874, about Brooks supporter Captain J. M. Murphy forming a company at New Gascony. Responding with a diverse force of white and black troops, White engaged in a steamboat expedition that culminated in an attack on Murphy's forces, resulting in casualties.

== Personal life ==
He married Julia Dorriss on January 15, 1868.
