= Augustus Garland House =

Historic house in Arkansas, United States

- U.S. National Register of Historic Places
- U.S. Historic district – Contributing property
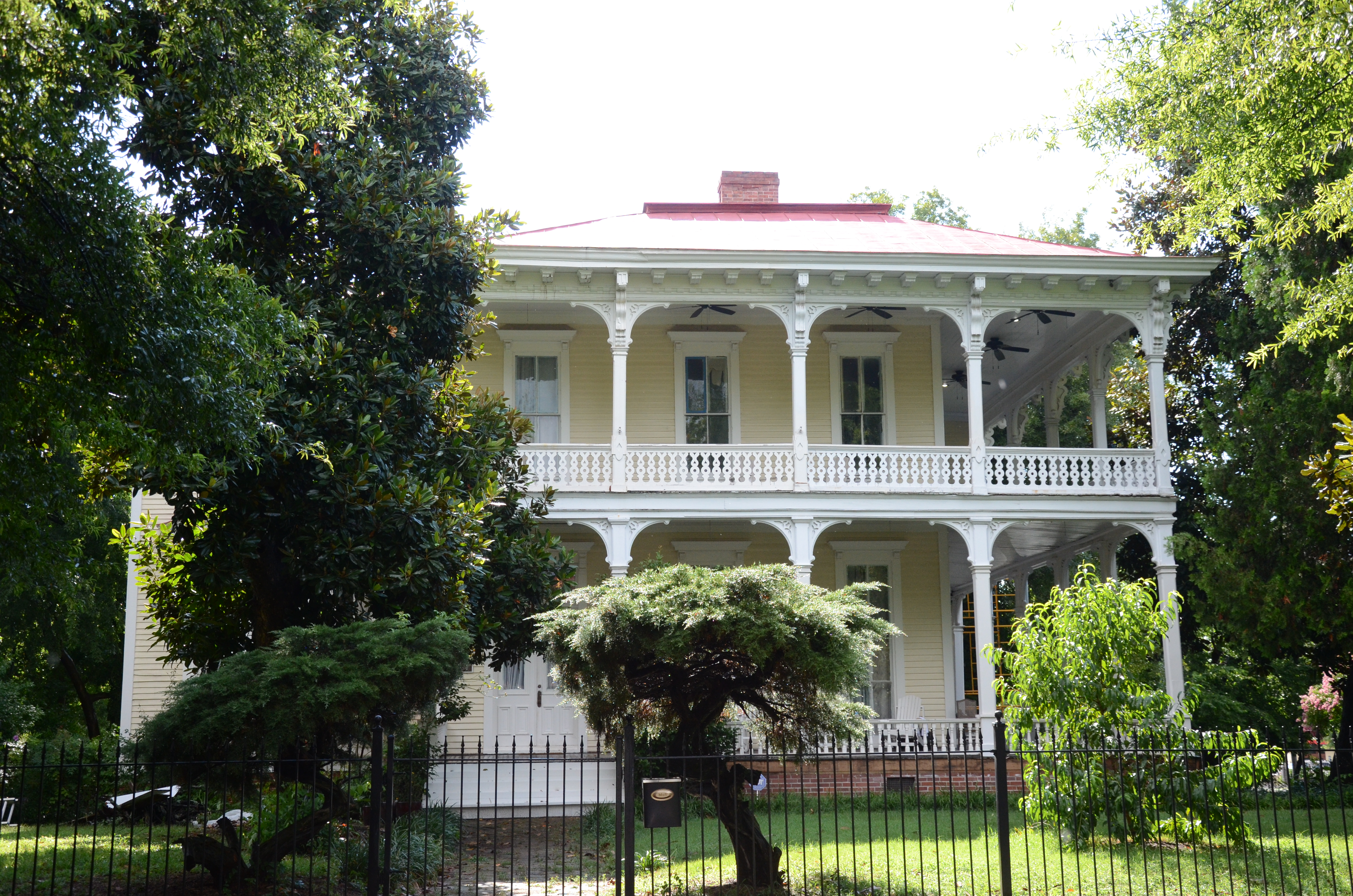

- Location within Arkansas Location within the United States
- Location: 1404 Scott St., Little Rock, Arkansas
- Coordinates: 34°44′5″N 92°16′19″W
- Area: less than one acre
- Built: 1873; 153 years ago
- Architect: Ward & Lavender
- Architectural style: Italianate, steamboat Gothic
- Part of: MacArthur Park Historic District (ID77000269)
- NRHP reference No.: 75000408

Significant dates
- Added to NRHP: June 10, 1975; 51 years ago
- Designated CP: July 25, 1977; 49 years ago

The Augustus Garland House is a historic house at 1404 Scott Street in Little Rock, Arkansas. It is a two-story wood-frame structure, with a truncated hip roof, weatherboard siding, and brick foundation. It has an elaborately decorated two-story front porch, featuring bracketed square columns, low jigsawn balustrades, and a modillioned and dentillated cornice. It was built in 1873 for Augustus Garland, a prominent local lawyer who served as Governor of Arkansas, United States Attorney General, and United States Senator.

The house was listed on the National Register of Historic Places in 1975.

== See also ==
- National Register of Historic Places listings in Little Rock, Arkansas
