= 1990 Arkansas Amendment 3 =

Referendum on racial integration

Proposed Constitutional Amendment 3
- November 6, 1990

Results
Choice	Votes	%
Yes	273,527	50.96%
No	263,261	49.04%
Total votes	536,788	100.00%
County results
Yes
60–70%
50–60%
No
70–80%
60–70%
50–60%
No data
No data

1990 Arkansas Amendment 3 was a ballot measure on the November 6, 1990, general election ballot to amend the Constitution of Arkansas to repeal Amendment 44, which was intended to allow the state to nullify federal integration laws. Amendment 44 had previously been overturned in 1989 by a federal court, but was still part of the state constitution. The ballot measure passed with 50.96% of the vote, repealing Amendment 44.

== Background ==
In 1954, the US Supreme Court ruled in Brown v. Board of Education that state laws preventing racial integration are incompatible with the US Constitution. In response, the US federal government began requiring states to racially integrate their public education systems. In opposition to this ruling, the legislature of Arkansas proposed an amendment, 1956 Arkansas Amendment 47, to the Constitution of Arkansas. The amendment stated that Arkansas can interpose any federally-mandated racial integration, thereby preventing it from occurring in the state. The amendment was legislatively referred to voters, who approved it in 1956 by 56% to 44%. It was therefore incorporated into the Arkansas constitution, as Amendment 44.

Amendment 44 was challenged in the 1989 legal case Dietz v. State of Arkansas, which was heard in the United States District Court for the Eastern District of Arkansas. Judge Henry Woods ruled the amendment unconstitutional, because it violated the Supremacy Clause of the US Constitution. Following this, the Arkansas General Assembly referred Amendment 3 to the 1990 ballot, to remove the outdated text from the constitution. Lloyd R. George, who sponsored the amendment in the legislature, wrote that "it's terrible that it's on the books and used in a court case as reflecting on the attitude of the people of Arkansas", and strongly urged its repeal. The amendment had been ignored by state officials since its passing in 1956.

== Contents ==
The amendment appeared on the ballot as follows:

Amendment 44 to the Arkansas Constitution is hereby repealed.

== Support and opposition ==
There was no significant campaign either for or against the amendment. The Baxter Bulletin endorsed the amendment, writing that it deserves passage "even if some may only see it as a symbolic gesture". The strongest opposition came from John Norman Warnock of Camden, Arkansas. Warnock, who was an active segregationist throughout the 1960s and 1970s, aired ads in the week leading up to the election urging voters to reject Amendment 3, as well as the other statewide ballot measures.

== Results and analysis ==
Proposed Constitutional Amendment 3
Choice	Votes	%
For	273,527	50.96
Against	263,261	49.04
Total	536,788	100.00

Amendment 3 passed narrowly with 50.96% of the vote. The amendment's narrow margin was attributed both to white racial resentment and general unfamiliarity with the measure, as it failed in some majority black precincts.
