= SS Uriah M. Rose =

World War II Liberty ship of the United States

History

United States
- Name: Uriah M. Rose
- Namesake: Uriah M. Rose
- Owner: War Shipping Administration (WSA)
- Operator: American President Lines
- Builder: Richmond Shipyards, Richmond, California
- Yard number: 2729
- Way number: 7
- Laid down: 19 December 1943
- Launched: 10 January 1944
- Fate: Sold, 1947; Scrapped, 1972

General characteristics
- Type: Liberty ship
- Tonnage: 7,000 long tons deadweight (DWT)
- Length: 441 ft 6 in (134.57 m)
- Beam: 56 ft 11 in (17.35 m)
- Draft: 27 ft 9 in (8.46 m)
- Propulsion: Two oil-fired boilers; Triple-expansion steam engine; Single screw; 2,500 hp (1,864 kW)
- Speed: 11 knots (20 km/h; 13 mph)
- Capacity: 9,140 tons cargo
- Complement: 41
- Armament: 1 × Stern-mounted 4 in (100 mm) deck gun; AA guns

SS Uriah M. Rose (MC contract 2729) was a Liberty ship built in the United States during World War II. She was named after Uriah M. Rose, an influential Arkansas lawyer.

The ship was laid down by Permanente Metals in their Richmond Yard #2 on December 19, 1943, then launched on January 10, 1944. Uriah M. Rose was operated by American President Lines under charter with the Maritime Commission and War Shipping Administration. American President Lines. In 1947 she was sold to French Gov't.(Cie.Generale Transatlantique) and renamed Aurray. In 1950 she was sold to Messageries Maritimes, Paris. In 1961 she was sold to Zim Israel Nav.Co, Haifa under an Israeli flag and renamed Pan. Zim Israel Nav.Co converted to motor ship, removing her steam engines. In 1964 she was sold to Pagan SS Corp, Nassau, a British flag and renamed Orchidea. In 1970 she was sold to Ardena Shipping Company, a Cyprus flag and renamed Ardena. In 1972 she was scrapped at Bilbao.
