= U.M. Rose School =

- U. M. Rose School
- U.S. National Register of Historic Places
- U.S. Historic district – Contributing property
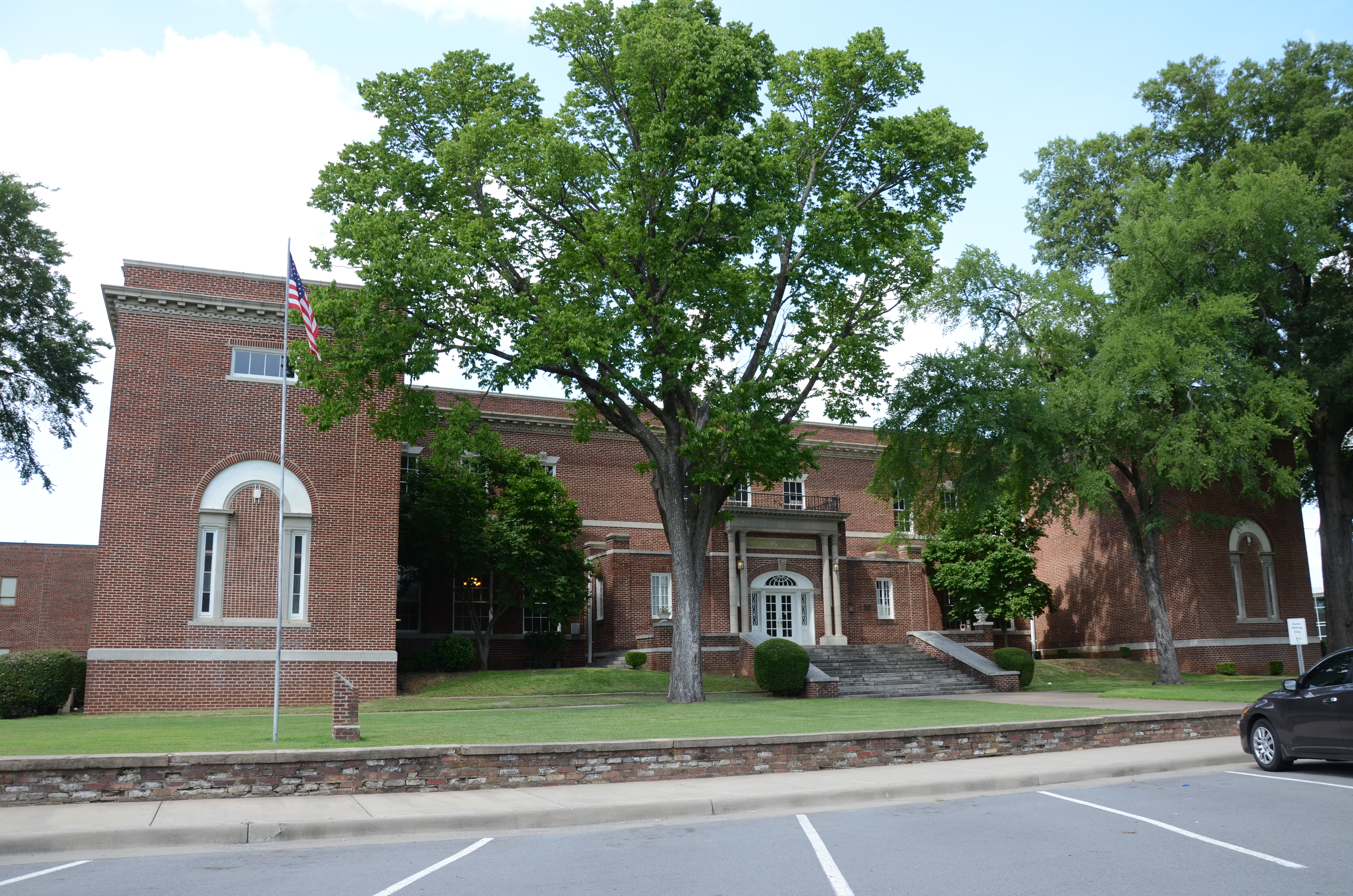

- Location within Arkansas Location within the United States
- Location: Izard and W. 13th St., Little Rock, Arkansas
- Coordinates: 34°44′16″N 92°16′54″W
- Area: less than one acre
- Built: 1915
- Architect: Charles L. Thompson
- Architectural style: Colonial Revival
- Part of: Philander Smith College Historic District (ID99000229)
- MPS: Thompson, Charles L., Design Collection TR
- NRHP reference No.: 88002820

Significant dates
- Added to NRHP: December 8, 1988
- Designated CP: September 13, 1999

The U.M. Rose School is a historic school building at the corner of Izard and West 13th Streets, on the campus of Philander Smith College in Little Rock, Arkansas. A two-story U-shaped Colonial Revival brick building, it was built in 1915 designed by Arkansas architect Charles L. Thompson, and was called "by far the best constructed" building in Little Rock.

It served the city as a primary school for many years. It is now known as the James M. Cox Administration Building, and houses the college's administrative offices.

The school is named after U. M. Rose, a prominent lawyer and judge.

The building was listed on the National Register of Historic Places in 1988.

== See also ==
- National Register of Historic Places listings in Little Rock, Arkansas
