= Anthony House (Little Rock, Arkansas) =

Hotel in Arkansas, United States

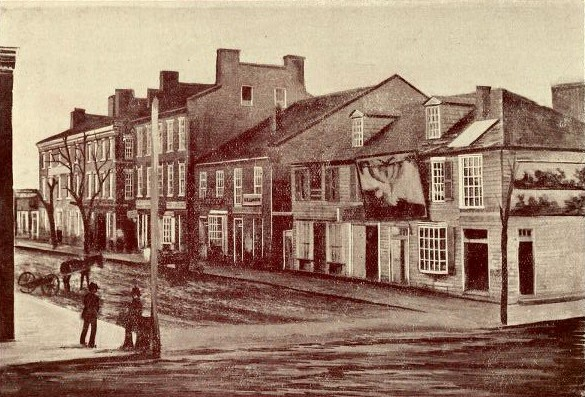
- Corner of Markham and Main Streets, c. 1855
- Former names: American Hotel

General information
- Status: Destroyed
- Type: Hotel
- Location: Little Rock, Arkansas
- Coordinates: 34°44′52.1″N 92°16′10.0″W
- Named for: James C. Anthony
- Completed: 1839
- Destroyed: September 19, 1875

Dimensions
- Other dimensions: 64 feet (20 m) across x 58 feet (18 m)

Technical details
- Material: Brick
- Floor count: 3

Other information
- Number of rooms: 22

The Anthony House was a famous 22 room hotel on the southwest corner of Markham and Scott streets in Little Rock, Arkansas. Construction on the hotel began in 1839. It served as the headquarters for Governor Elisha Baxter during the 1874 Brooks–Baxter War. The hotel was destroyed by fire in 1875.
