= Brooks–Baxter War =

Attempted coup d'état against Arkansas governor Elisha Baxter's administration

Brooks—Baxter War
- Part of the Reconstruction Period in Arkansas
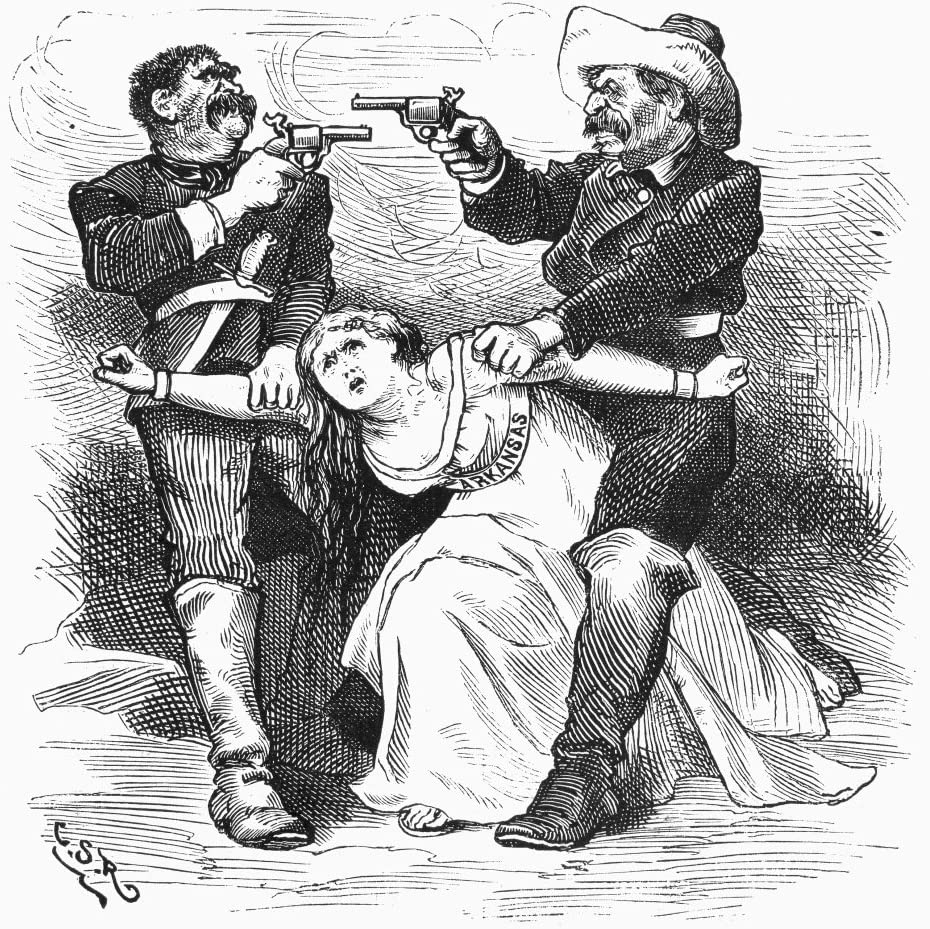
- "A Plague O' Both Your Houses!" by C.S.R. shows "Arkansas" as victim of the feud between the two sides.
| Date | April 15 – May 15, 1874 (30 days) |
| Location | Little Rock and New Gascony, Arkansas |
| Result | Baxter administration reinstated |

Belligerents
| Baxter administration (Note: "It is well known that there are three parties in this State: The State Administration party, called 'Minstrels'; part of the Republican Party opposed to the Minstrels, popularly called the 'Brindle-tails', and the Democratic party." (Harrell 1893, p. 96).) “Minstrel” Republicans | Republican opposition "Brindletail" Republicans |

Commanders and leaders
| Elisha Baxter: Robert C. Newton | Joseph Brooks: Robert F. Catterson; James F. Fagan |

Strength
| ~2,000 militia | ~1,000 militia |

Casualties and losses
- ~200 dead

The Brooks–Baxter War, also known as the Brooks–Baxter Affair, or Arkansas Civil War was an attempt made by failed gubernatorial candidate Joseph Brooks of the "Brindletail" faction of Arkansas' Republican Party to take control of the state from Elisha Baxter, who was the Republican governor. The victor in the end was the Baxter administration, also known as the "Minstrels", supported by some "carpetbaggers" and Democrats over the Brindle-tails supported by "scalawags" and "freedmen".

The struggle began with the ratification of the 1868 Arkansas Constitution, rewritten to allow Arkansas to rejoin the Union after the American Civil War. The Reconstruction Acts required the rebel states to accept the 14th Amendment – establishing civil rights for freedmen – and enact new constitutions providing suffrage to freedmen while temporarily disenfranchising former Confederates. Some conservatives and Democrats refused to participate in the writing of the constitution and ceased participation in government. Republicans and Unionists wanting Arkansas to rejoin the Union formed a coalition to write and pass the new constitution, and formed a new state government. In the wake of a wave of reactionary violence by the Ku Klux Klan and a poor economy, the coalition soon fractured into two factions: the Minstrels, who were mostly carpetbaggers, and the Brindle-tails, who were mostly scalawags. This led to a failed impeachment trial of the carpetbagger Republican governor, Powell Clayton; he was then elected a U.S. Senator by the Arkansas General Assembly.

The 1872 gubernatorial election witnessed a narrow victory for Minstrel Elisha Baxter over Brindle-tail Joseph Brooks in an election tainted by fraud and intimidation. Brooks contested the outcome through legal channels, initially without success. However, Baxter's decision to restore voting rights to former Confederates alienated much of his support base. In 1874, a county judge declared Brooks the rightful governor, citing election fraud. Brooks seized control of the government by force, but Baxter refused to step down. Each side garnered support from their respective militia, consisting of several hundred black men. This led to several violent clashes between the factions. As the conflict continued, Black Arkansans increasingly supported Brooks over Baxter, and white Democrats rallied behind Baxter in an attempt to end Reconstruction in Arkansas. Ultimately, U.S. President Ulysses S. Grant reluctantly intervened, throwing his support behind Baxter and bringing an end to the conflict.

The conflict, followed by a complete restructuring of state government under the Arkansas Constitution of 1874, marked the end of Reconstruction in Arkansas, resulting in a significantly weakened Republican Party in the state as Democrats took power and controlled the governorship for 90 years.

== Background ==
=== Arkansas Constitution of 1868 ===
After the American Civil War, rebel states, including Arkansas, were in disarray. Slavery, key to their economies and social structure, was gone. Northerners, whom Southerners called 'carpetbaggers', came to the defeated Southern states to work in the rebuilding process. In 1866, Congress grew increasingly disturbed by post-war developments in the rebel states: pre-Civil War elites, including plantation owners and Confederate Army officers, were reelected to government positions, and southern legislatures enacted "Black Codes" limiting the rights of former slaves, and violence against blacks was common. To redress the matter, Congress passed the Reconstruction Acts of 1867, dissolving rebel state governments and dividing the South into military districts. Rebel states could only be readmitted to the Union if they wrote and ratified new constitutions providing civil rights for freedmen, and accepting the 14th Amendment.

In the fall of 1867 Arkansans voted to convene a new constitutional convention and selected delegates, who convened in Little Rock in January 1868. The President was Thomas M. Bowen of Crawford County. The vice presidents included James Hinds, Joseph Brooks, John McClure. A coalition of native white unionists, freedman, and carpetbagger Republicans prevailed on most critical proposals. The 1868 Constitution of Arkansas, adopted by the convention on February 11, 1868, marked a significant shift in the state's governance and societal structure. This constitution extended voting rights to emancipated adult male slaves, now referred to as freedmen, acknowledging their new status as citizens. The constitution also introduced a system of public education, accessible to all citizens regardless of race or color. Additionally, welfare institutions were established to support those in need, a provision that had been absent under the previous government. The 1868 Constitution expanded the powers of the governor, including the ability to appoint state officials. Furthermore, the constitution temporarily disenfranchised former Confederate Army officers and those who refused to pledge allegiance to the civil and political equality of all men. This measure was taken to ensure the loyalty of the state's citizens and officials to the new order.

The Democratic Party was also in disarray in Arkansas in 1867–68. One unifying principle of the Democrats, however, was white supremacy and resistance to black suffrage. At the January 27, 1868, Democratic State Convention in Little Rock, Democrats announced the avowed purpose of uniting "the opponents of negro suffrage and domination". Some party leaders opposed Reconstruction in favor of continued military rule, which was far from what they wanted, but seemed like a better option than allowing freedmen all the civil rights of white citizens, including the right to vote. The more conservative wings of the party simply showed no interest in the new constitution and remained loyal to the ideas embodied in the Confederacy. During the constitutional convention, Democrats convened their own party convention. Many chose to boycott elections on the grounds that the new constitution was illegal, because it disenfranchised them while giving suffrage to the freedmen, whom they insisted were an inferior race. They also alienated the freedmen who were now the largest block of voters in the state, by adopting resolutions against them: their first resolution of the convention was "Resolved, that we are in favor of a White Man's Government in a White Man's country."

The new constitution was ratified by the people of the state, at the election beginning March 13, 1868. This election was riddled with inconsistency. Alvan Cullem Gillem, the commanding officer of the Fourth Military District which included Arkansas, noted in his report to Congress that more votes had been cast than there were registered voters. Furthermore, the county registrars were allowing people who claimed to be registered in other counties to vote, while also not keeping track of what county these people claimed to be registered in. Despite the obvious inconsistencies in the election, Congress was satisfied and Arkansas was readmitted to the union. This election was a harbinger of the future voting irregularities that eventually led to the Brooks-Baxter conflict.

=== Clayton administration ===
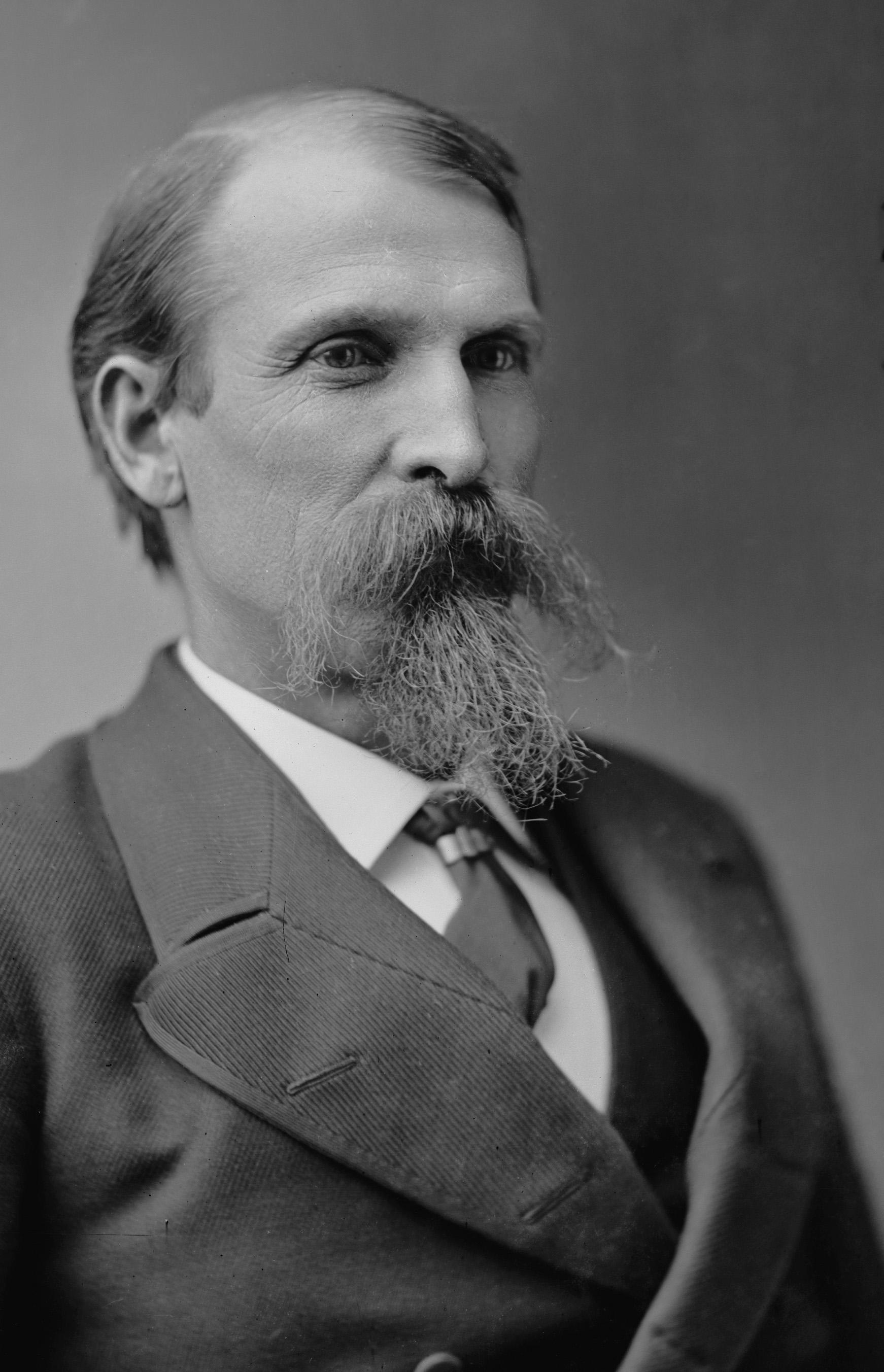
Powell Clayton

Powell Clayton, a 35-year-old former brigadier general in the Union army who remained in Arkansas after marrying an Arkansas woman, was elected governor as a Republican in April, 1868. The election was scarred with irregularities. For example, the return of votes in Pulaski County exceeded the number of registered voters. Also, the registrars, who controlled the distribution of ballots, admitted that they had given ballots to voters from other counties if they could show a valid registration certificate. Both sides claimed election fraud and voter intimidation: armed parties had been stationed on roads to keep voters away from the polls. General Gillem, commander of the military district that included Arkansas, wrote to General Grant that it would take months to sort out which side had committed the greater election fraud.

In July 1868, Arkansas rejoined the Union and Clayton was inaugurated governor. The new general assembly had already begun meeting in April, but had been unable to do anything other than prepare legislation for the time when the state was readmitted. The prior governor, Isaac Murphy, whose administration was not recognized by the federal government, continued to act as executive of the state during this time. Both Clayton and Murphy managed to draw a paycheck as governor at the same time. When Clayton took office, he appointed most of the key Republican politicians to positions within the new state government; however, he failed to find a place for Joseph Brooks.

Rivalry between Brooks and Clayton predated the 1868 election. Clayton saw Brooks as his strongest competitor for preference and distinction and did not want him to become too entrenched with the party leadership. Brooks felt that his ability and service to the party were not being recognized or appreciated, and he grew bitter and resentful of the other Republicans, including Clayton.

Democrats, calling themselves "Conservatives," strongly opposed granting freedmen voting rights, viewing it as an overreach of the 14th Amendment. Their resistance stemmed from a perceived threat to political power and social order. Frustration grew as they had to pay taxes for infrastructure while still being disenfranchised, fueling opposition to Radical policies.

Violence soon erupted throughout the state. Former Confederate Army officers in nearby Memphis, Tennessee, formed the Ku Klux Klan to fight against the new order. The Klan quickly spread into Arkansas. Republican officials, including Congressmen James Hinds, were attacked, as were black citizens seeking to exercise their new civil rights. Hinds and Brooks were ambushed by gunmen on the road in Monroe County, while traveling to a political event. Brooks was severely wounded and Hinds was killed. Hinds was the first sitting member of congress to ever be murdered, and his murder created national disgust for the ongoing political violence in the South. A coroner's inquest identified a local Democratic official and suspected Ku Klux Klansman as the killer. Most contemporaries blamed the Klan, which had threatened to kill Hinds and was actively killing and assaulting other Republicans. Reflecting the times, no-one was ever arrested for the murder. As more violence spread throughout the state, Clayton declared martial law in 14 counties.

Many Democratic newspapers denied the existence of the secretive Ku Klux Klan while still reporting on the violence. 20th-century research shows the Klan was responsible for most of the violence in the state at this time. A state militia was organized to put down the violence, although it was poorly equipped. With no uniforms and irregular weapons and mounts, the militia was often mistaken for wandering bands of plunderers, sparking a brief but long-remembered "Militia War", and causing terror throughout the state. This was similar to what was going on in North Carolina at the same time, now referred to as the Kirk–Holden war.

Fearing he could not guarantee the integrity of the polling places, Clayton canceled fall elections in counties where political violence had broken out. In doing so, however, he further reduced the Democratic vote, and the state ended up supporting the election of President Grant, the Republican candidate, despite the population being mostly Democratic.

=== Paying for the new infrastructure ===
Governor Clayton faced a desperate need for infrastructure rebuilding. His diverse efforts included hefty tax hikes, bond issues to restore credit, and even printing state-issued "scrip." Despite these measures, soaring inflation, economic hardship, and a tripling of Arkansas's debt by 1873 marked this period of financial struggle and political discontent.

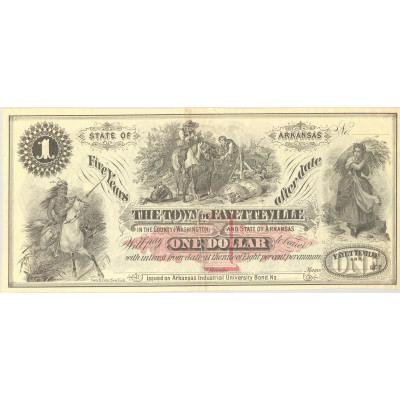
In order to pay for the new infrastructure, Governor Powell allowed the state to be flooded with paper scrip. This is an example of a one dollar note from Fayetteville, Arkansas issued in 1872 worth one dollar for five years after its printing date.

Introducing more taxes proved to be hugely unpopular among both Democrats and Republicans, and the people of the state were not generally prosperous. Bond issues generated controversy and were the source of scandals in the administration. All of the old railroad and infrastructure bonds, including the controversial Holford bonds which had already been declared illegal by the Arkansas Supreme Court, were gathered into a funding act and passed by the legislature. Many bonds were issued for roads and railroads that were never built, or were constructed and then torn up and rebuilt in another direction. Some projects even received the same amount of funding from different bonds, such as embankments built for railroads where roads were funded to be built by a different bond. One of the most controversial bonds involved the purchase of slate for a state penitentiary roof, which was diverted for the construction of a mansion of a Republican official J. L. Hodges, who eventually served jail time for the incident. Promissory notes, or scrip, were issued to raise money. The money was used for construction projects, and invested in public infrastructure. Article VI, Sec 10 of the new constitution stated that the credit of the state could not be loaned without the consent of the voters, making these promissory notes illegal. Their introduction also caused actual currency to go out of circulation.

The Radical Republican state initiatives included levees and railroads. Arkansas' first public school system was created. The administration and its supporters established Arkansas Industrial University, the basis for the future University of Arkansas in Fayetteville; what would become the Arkansas School for the Deaf; and the Arkansas School for the Blind, which relocated from Arkadelphia to Little Rock. However, state debt increased dramatically. The state had a budget surplus when Clayton came to office, but by the end of his term, the state debt had increased to $5 million.

=== Minstrels and Brindle-tails ===
The 'scalawag' native conservative Republicans and the 'carpetbagger' migrant radical Republicans had managed to form a coalition to seize complete control of the state in 1868, however this would be short lived. Clayton actively pursued social and political reforms during Reconstruction, including enfranchising freedmen and advocating for their civil rights. This alienated many white Republicans, who saw these policies as a threat to their traditional power structure and social dominance. Many white Republicans, particularly in rural areas, held racist views and resented the advancements made by freedmen. They opposed Clayton's Reconstruction policies and felt the party was straying from its original focus on economic revival and states' rights. Personal rivalries and disagreements over political strategies further fueled the division. Some Republicans prioritized economic recovery and believed cooperation with Democrats (who held economic power) was necessary. Others saw Democrats as obstructionist and favored more radical measures to address economic disparities and empower freedmen. National Republican policies, particularly President Grant's perceived leniency towards the South, further fueled discontent among Arkansas Republicans. Some felt the national party was abandoning its commitment to Reconstruction and racial equality. The Democratic party actively exploited the divisions within the Republican party, portraying the Scalawags as traitors to white southerners and the Carpetbaggers as dangerous radicals. These factors converged to create a deep rift within the Republican party, and irreconcilably divided the party into factions.

The scalawags met in convention and adopted the name the "Liberal Republicans" and a populist platform for universal amnesty, universal suffrage, economic reforms, and an end to the so-called Clayton dictatorship. A small group of Claytonites, disgruntled with the extravagance of the administration, also defected to this group. Among them was Joseph Brooks, who claimed to be the originator of Radicalism in Arkansas and became their natural leader. Brooks was a Northern Methodist preacher and had been a chaplain in a black regiment for the Union army. He was known for his fiery speeches that united political and religious themes. He had been the chairman of the 1868 Republican state convention and was at the time the State Senator from White County and Pulaski County. Although he had been involved with the carpetbaggers since the beginning, Clayton had not given him a government position, seeing Brooks as a potential rival.

The Claytonites started calling the new faction the Brindle-tails. This name can be traced back to Clayton supporter Jack Agery, who was a freedman, contractor, and orator in the state. In a speech he gave in Eagle Township in Pulaski County, he said that Brooks reminded him of a "brindle-tailed bull" he had known as a child that scared all the other cattle. Brooks claimed that they were originally just called "Brindles" referring to the mixed races of his supporters, his initial power base had been the black community. The Claytonist, he said, added the "tail" part in their newspapers. The Brindle-tails' platform included a proposal for a new constitution that would re-enfranchise ex-Confederates, which appealed to Democrats and pre-war Whigs. They began gaining support among the disenfranchised and the Liberal Republicans.

For their part, the Brindle-tails mockingly referred to the carpetbaggers and Claytonist Republicans as the Minstrels, and that name stuck as well. This moniker can probably be traced to John G. Price, the editor of the Little Rock Republican and a staunch Clayton supporter. Price was known to be a good musician and comedian and had even once filled in for a sick performer in a minstrel show, complete with blackface.

The Brindle-tails desperately wanted Clayton out of the governor's office. Conveniently, Lieutenant Governor James M. Johnson was a Brindle-tail, so the natural course of action was to try to get rid of Clayton and let Johnson succeed him. Clayton was well aware of their plans, and when he left the state briefly for New York on business concerning the Holford Bonds, he informed no one. When Johnson, who was at home some distance from the capital, found out he tried to head to the capital to take control and have Clayton arrested and impeached. He arrived too late. Subsequently, after Johnson made a speech demanding changes in the administration, the Minstrels started to target Johnson. On January 30, 1871, they introduced articles of impeachment in the General Assembly against him. The chief charge was that Johnson, acting as the President of the Senate, had administered the oath of office to Joseph Brooks, who had recently been elected as state senator, and then recognized him on the floor. Although this was legitimately within his powers as the lieutenant governor to do, he escaped impeachment by only two votes. The scrutiny of the proceedings seriously damaged his reputation, even though he had done nothing wrong, and his political career never recovered.

In 1871, Clayton was accused of deliberately tampering with the results of the U.S. house election between Thomas Boles and John Edwards in the third congressional district. According to Arkansas law, the results were to be certified and given to the secretary of state, then Robert J. T. White. After that, the governor and secretary of state would "take up and arrange" the results and the governor would issue a proclamation declaring the winner and deliver the seal of the state to him. Boles won the election but Clayton instead certified Edwards as the winner following the actions of the State Supreme Court and a legislature investigation concerning the outcome of the General Assembly elections in Pulaski County. Polls in Pulaski County were taken over by Brindle-tails and stopped legally appointed Minstrel judges from arriving at the polls to do their duty. Judges for the polls of the First and Third Wards and Eagle Township held separate voting boxes nearby. The clerk certified all usurped boxes and refused to certify the votes that were conducted by the legally appointed judges. The defeated candidates sued, and the State Supreme Court forced the clerk to certify the votes. As a result, the Brindle-tail delegates of Pulaski County were expelled from the state house. A legislature committee headed by S. W. Mallory recommended that the elections of certain townships in Pulaski County be declared void. The senate followed and expelled Joseph Brooks and seated his opponent. Clayton, convinced of fraud, declared Edwards as the winner of the election despite the Secretary of State already certifying Boles’ victory of 10,314 Boles to 8,210 Edwards. Clayton was then indicted by the federal circuit court of violating the first enforcement act. It was found that his actions were not illegal, he was in no way binding to the Congress and under federal law of the time, state governors were not considered election officials. Boles became a congressman.

To sequester Clayton from the affairs in the state, the Brindle-tails and the Democrats decided the only thing they could do was elect him to the U.S. Senate. However, even though he won unanimously, he refused to take his seat, which would mean letting Johnson become governor. In 1871, the state House of Representatives drafted articles of impeachment against Clayton, charging him with a wide variety of impeachable actions, including depriving Johnson and several other state officials of offices to which they had been fairly elected, removing state officials and judges from offices to which they had been fairly elected, aiding in fraudulent elections, taking bribes for state railroad bonds, and various other high crimes and misdemeanors. The members of the House then tried to suspend Clayton from his duties as governor by force. They even apparently tried locking him in his office and nailing the door shut. However, Clayton responded that they had no right by the state constitution to deprive him of his office. At the same time, the House also brought impeachment charges against Chief Justice John McClure for his part in trying to deny Johnson the privileges of his office of lieutenant governor.

Two successive inquiries failed to find evidence against Clayton. The legislature refused to continue, all charges were dropped, and Clayton was exonerated. In fact, he was never found guilty of any wrongdoing while governor. Finally a deal was reached. Johnson, now politically badly damaged by his impeachment ordeal and willing to take any position he could get, resigned as lieutenant governor, was appointed Secretary of State, and was given a compensation of several thousand dollars for his loss of power and prestige, since he would not become governor. A staunch Clayton supporter, O. A. Hadley, was then appointed lieutenant governor. Three days later, Clayton left the state for Washington, D.C., to join the U.S. Senate, and Hadley succeeded him as governor.

The Democrats' paper, the Arkansas Daily Gazette crowed:

It will be a source of infinite joy and satisfaction, to the oppressed and long suffering people of Arkansas, to learn that, on yesterday, the tyrant, despot and usurper, late of Kansas, but more recently, governor of Arkansas, took his departure from the city and his hateful presence out of our state, it is to be hoped, forever and ever.

Although no longer a state official, Clayton remained the leader of the state Republicans and was controlling now not only appointments within the state, but also the flow of federal money and positions. He began purging Brindle-tails from federal office, including Joseph Brooks, who was at this point an Internal Revenue Assessor.

== 1872 gubernatorial election ==
=== Party Nominations ===
The Brindle Tails, composed mostly of 'scalawag' Liberal Republicans, chose Joseph Brooks as their nominee for Governor. Brooks was a very vocal supporter of civil rights for former slaves, but also a supporter of re-enfranchisement for ex-Confederates, which was the sentiment nationally of Liberal Republicans.

At their party convention, the Minstrels faction (who controlled the Claytonite Republicans) nominated Elisha Baxter as their candidate. Baxter was a lawyer, politician, and merchant from North Carolina who had settled in Batesville. A lifelong Whig, he was elected Mayor of Batesville in 1853 and elected to the state legislature in 1858. At the start of the American Civil War, Baxter refused to fight for the Confederacy and attempted to flee to Missouri. He was captured and tried for treason. He escaped north and joined the 4th Arkansas Mounted Infantry (Union), serving as colonel of the regiment. In 1864, after Arkansas was occupied by Union troops, Baxter was appointed as Justice of the Arkansas Supreme Court, but he did not serve in that position. He and William Meade Fishback were chosen by the new legislature in May 1864 as the two U.S. senators from Arkansas, but in February 1865, their admission was denied by congressional Republicans displeased with Lincoln for trying to restore Southern representation in Congress so easily. In mid-1865, Baxter formed a law partnership in Little Rock with future U.S. Congressman and fellow Unionist James M. Hinds.

The Minstrels chose Baxter, believing that since he was a long time resident of the state and a former slave holder, he would appeal to the native Republicans and Democrats alike. Brooks was thoroughly disliked by both native Republicans and Democrats. In fact, Clayton would muse in his memoirs that besides himself, Joseph Brooks was the most disliked person in the state of Arkansas. Nevertheless, when the Democrats met, they agreed to endorse Joseph Brooks rather than run their own candidate. It was reported at the time that the committee had sent a group of Democrats to meet with Brooks and he had pledged to them that if elected he would support free and fair elections and the re-enfranchisement of Confederates. This alliance was aimed at supporting a Horace Greeley Liberal ticket on the national stage. However, Powell Clayton would later accuse Brooks of a broader political deal with the friends of Ku Klux Klan members Dandridge McRae and Jacob Frolich, who were involved in the murder of Albert H. Parker and had become fugitives. The Democrats would support Brooks and his followers for state offices in 1872 instead of nominating their own candidates; in exchange, Brooks and his faction were to assist in acquitting the White County prisoners associated with McRae and Frolich. The deal involved manipulation of the judicial process, including the election of a special judge sympathetic to their cause and the scattering of witnesses to prevent their testimony. Neither McRae or Frolich would ever be indicted and would end up serving as Secretary of State and Deputy Secretary of state of Arkansas respectively.

=== General election ===
The election of 1872 has been described as a "masterpiece of confusion" by Arkansas historian Michael B. Dougan. "That carpetbagger Brooks ran with Democratic support against a scalawag nominated by a party composed almost exclusively of carpetbaggers was enough to bewilder most voters as well as the modern student."

In the days before the election and the days afterward, predictions and reports of fraud were printed daily in the Gazette. Because of the relatively slow communications, messages from other counties were often delayed up to a week. There were numerous reports of anomalies in state polling centers, including names being inexplicably stricken from the voter registration lists and persons voting without proof of registration. The Gazette wrote:

It would be as great a farce of yesterday's election to designate it otherwise than a fraud. It was one of the worst ever yet perpetrated in the state. The city judges paid no attention to any registration either old or new, but permitted everybody to vote, and in many instances without question. Men were marched from one ward to another and voted early and often.

On November 6, 1872, the day after the general election, the Gazette reported: "The election was one of the most quiet in Little Rock we ever witnessed." The returns on that day were too small to report with any certainty who had won, and the newspaper reported fraud. Rumors flew about claiming that registration had been cut short or extended in many counties to suit the needs of whoever controlled the polling places. The following Monday, the Gazette published incomplete tallies from the various counties, showing a small majority for Baxter. They also reported more forms of attempted fraud. Some unofficial polling places had apparently been set up, but only those votes cast at the regular polls had been certified.

By November 15, the Gazette claimed victory for Brooks. By the next day, because of the irregularities and votes that would be thrown out, the projected winner was Baxter, by only 3,000 votes. The General Assembly met on January 6 for a special joint session to declare Baxter, who by their count had received the most votes, the legal winner of the election. After a short address he was sworn in by Chief Justice John McClure. He then assumed the duties of Governor of the State of Arkansas.

Brooks supporters immediately claimed that the election had been dishonest. The Democrats, the Brindle-tails, and all non-Republican newspapers openly and vocally denounced the election as fraudulent, and insisted that Brooks had in fact received the most votes. The general citizenry of both parties, however, accepted the results. The Brooks supporters were in the minority in believing that the election had been fraudulent.

== Electoral disputes ==
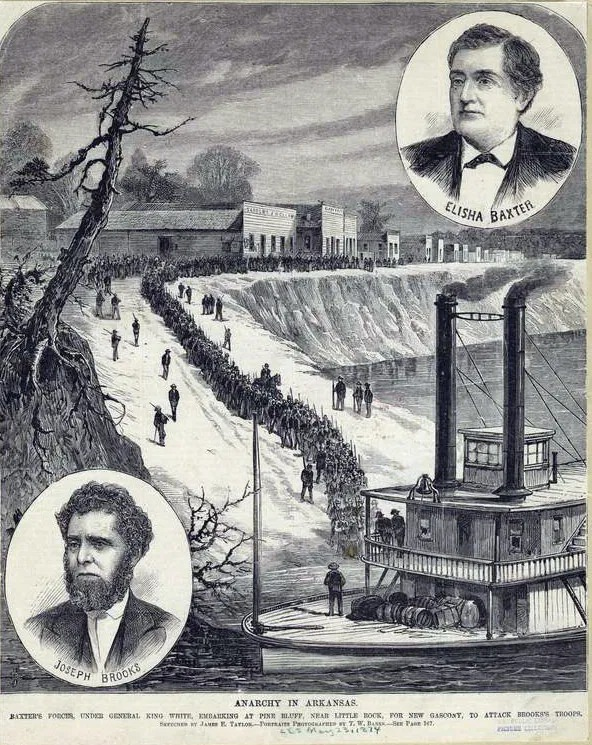
ANARCHY IN ARKANSAS reads this wood cut purportedly showing Baxter's men loading onto a steam ship on their way to attack Brooks forces. This image appeared in many major news papers including the New York Times.

=== Brooks's legal battle ===
The first to file suit over the election was Judge William M. Harrison, who had been on the Brooks ticket. He filed a Bill of Equity with the U.S. Circuit Court in Little Rock, claiming he had a right to a seat on the Supreme Court due to the fraudulent election. The Brooks Campaign likewise filed suit in the Circuit Court shortly thereafter on January 7, 1873. Judge H. C. Caldwell heard the Harrison case, and rendered an opinion stating that the Federal Court had no jurisdiction in the matter, and dismissed the case. The Harrison decision resulted in the dismissal of the Brooks case as well.

Brooks then took a petition to the General Assembly, asking for a recount. The assembly took up the matter on April 20, 1873, and voted 63 to 9 not to allow Brooks to contest the election. This did not deter Brooks, and he applied to the Arkansas Supreme Court for a writ of quo warranto, and was again denied. They also ruled that state courts had no jurisdiction in the matter, and dismissed the case. They gave a lengthy explanation as to why the General Assembly should decide contested gubernatorial elections in Joint Session, since they are the directly elected representatives of the people.

It appeared that Brooks had exhausted all legal avenues at this point, but on June 16, 1873, he filed another lawsuit against Baxter, this time with the Pulaski County district court. Under Arkansas Civil Code sec. 525, if a person usurps an office or franchise to which he is not entitled, an action at law may be instituted against him either by the State or by the party rightly entitled to the office. On October 8, 1873, Baxter filed a plea of non-jurisdiction, but he believed that the court might decide against him. He issued a telegram to President Grant informing him of the basic situation in Arkansas and asked for federal troops to help him maintain the peace. Grant denied his request.

=== Baxter and Brooks switch positions ===
There were rumors that Joseph McClure, the Chief Justice who had sworn him into office, intended to have Baxter either arrested or killed, ostensibly because Baxter had replaced W. W. Wilshire, a Minstrel, with Robert C. Newton, an ex-Confederate, as head of the state militia. U.S. Attorney General Williams contacted Baxter and suggested that he ask for federal troops for protection again. A letter from President Grant followed, offering protection. The Grant administration usually followed Powell Clayton's lead where Arkansas matters were concerned, so it can be concluded that the former governor was still supporting Baxter. The Republican Party of Arkansas, still controlled by the Minstrel faction, issued a statement denouncing Brooks' attempt to contest the election, which was published in the Little Rock Republican on October 8, 1873, and signed by all the major members of the party, including Clayton. However, the Minstrels would soon turn on Baxter for not following the party line.

Baxter had now been governor for a year and was following an independent course. He began dismantling the systems put in place by the Minstrels. He appointed honest Democrats and Republicans to the Election Commission, reorganized the militia by placing it under the control of the State, rather than the governor, and pushed for an amendment to the state constitution to re-enfranchise ex-Confederates.

On March 3, 1873, the state legislature passed a bill re-enfranchising ex-Confederates, to the delight of much of the state population and the concern of the Minstrels. The legislature called a special election in November to replace 33 members, mostly Minstrels, who had left for patronage jobs in the Baxter government. Baxter refused to let the Minstrels manipulate the election, declaring that free, honest elections would be held during his term. With the help of the newly re-enfranchised voters, conservative Democrats swept the election and gained a small majority in the legislature. Baxter was about to erode his Republican base out from under him.

In March 1874, Baxter vetoed the Railroad Steel Bill, the centerpiece of the Radical Republican Reconstruction plan. The bill would have released the railroad companies from their debts to the state and created a tax to pay the interest on the bonds. This was clearly not legal and the veto called into question the legality of the 1868 railroad bonds, which created a public bonded debt. It is likely the Minstrels struck a deal with Brooks to support the railroad bonds, and within a month the political backers of Brooks and Baxter began to switch.

Most importantly Senator Clayton had lost confidence in Governor Baxter's moderate style, which clashed with Clayton's progressive agenda. In his memoirs, written much later in life, Clayton would accuse Baxter of colluding with the Democrats, even saying when the two were traveling together campaigning Baxter would sneak off at night to meet secretly with Democrats, and made them promises he had no authority to. He would go as far as to say of Baxter: "If we did not elect Judge Baxter, we were defeated; and if we did elect him, we were also defeated, which in the end proved true." Specifically, what Clayton was most displeased with was Baxter's veto's several bills. One to fund the Little Rock and Fort Smith Railroad which had become embroiled in a scandal that involved House Speaker and Presidential candidate James G. Blaine. Another was a bill that called a constitutional convention to frame a new state constitution; Clayton believed that a new constitution was necessary to secure the rights of the freedmen and the loyal Unionists. Clayton was now publicly accusing Baxter of fraud. Besides the corruption in the 1872 election, Clayton claimed Baxter had issued fraudulent election credentials to several members of the legislature who were not legally elected, although who these members were and what the situation was is not clear. He also alleged that Baxter had used bribery and intimidation to secure his own election as governor. Clayton declared that Baxter was not the lawful governor of Arkansas, but an usurper who had betrayed the Republican party and the loyal people of the state. Clayton issued a statement saying that "Brooks was fairly elected in 1872; and kept out of office by fraud." Governor Baxter was now being supported by the Brindle-tails, re-enfranchisers, and the Democrats; whereas Brooks was finding support among the Claytonists, Northerners, Unionists, and Minstrels.

Brooks was assigned three prominent Minstrel attorneys, and after a year of sitting on the docket, at about 11 am on April 15, 1874, Baxter's demurrer to Brook's complaint was suddenly called up. Neither of Baxter's lawyers were present in the court room, and the demurrer had been submitted without their knowledge. Without giving Baxter any time to testify, Judge Whytock overruled the demurrer and awarded Brooks $2,000 in damages and the office of Governor of Arkansas. Neither Brooks nor the court notified the legislature or Governor Baxter. Judge Wytock then swore in Joseph Brooks as the new governor of Arkansas, despite having no authority to do so.

== Brindle-tails Seizure of Power ==
An artist's interpretation of Brooks and Baxter troops on the State House lawn, based on a photograph dating to the American Civil War. By the time of the Brooks-Baxter War, the split rail fence had been replaced by the wrought iron that is there now.

With the aid of General Robert F. Catterson and state militia, Brooks, accompanied by about 20 armed men, marched to the Arkansas Capitol building (now known as "the Old Statehouse"), located at Markham and Center streets in downtown Little Rock. They encountered little to no resistance and were able to seize the capital building and the state seal. The capital building did not have armed guards, a point Baxter remarked would have been absurd given the traditions of the American people.

By the end of the afternoon, nearly 300 armed men had converged on the lawn of the State Capitol. Brooks' men seized the state arsenal and began turning the Statehouse into an armed camp. Telegrams covered in signatures were sent to President Ulysses S. Grant supporting Brooks as the legal governor. Three out of the five Supreme Court justices also telegraphed the President in support of Brooks. Brooks telegraphed the President himself asking for access to weapons housed at the federal arsenal. He also issued a statement to the press proclaiming himself governor. The senators from the state, Clayton and Steven Dorsey, met with President Grant, and they sent a message to Brooks giving their support.

Brooks and his men told Baxter to leave or he would be arrested, given that he was outnumbered he was forced to comply, and before he could summon help the capital was over run with "desperadoes". He went to the Anthony House, three blocks away from the State Capitol, where he had supporters, and established a headquarters there. Powell Clayton refers to the Anthony House as "Democrat Headquarters" in his memoir. Baxter began immediately sending telegrams to President Grant and other officials asking them to intervene and uphold his legitimacy. He also issued a proclamation denouncing Brooks as an usurper and a traitor, and calling on the people of Arkansas to rally his supporters. Fighting did occur outside the hotel, and at least one man, David Fulton Shall, a prominent real estate dealer, was shot dead while standing in a window of the building.

Baxter then moved his headquarters to St. Johns College, a Masonic institution on the southeastern edge of the state. Baxter issued two proclamations to the press from his temporary office, asserting his rights to the governorship by vote of the people and the decision of the legislature; both were printed in the Gazette. He received support from many prominent Democrats in the city, all of whom had initially voted for Brooks. He then issued a dispatch to President Grant explaining the situation, calling Brooks and his band "revolutionaries", and stating that he would do everything up to and including armed conflict to regain control of the state organs. He asked for the support of the Federal Government.

Brooks issued a proclamation to the people of Arkansas asking them for their support. Baxter answered with a proclamation to the people of Arkansas declaring martial law in Pulaski County. A company was then issued from the young men of Little Rock. On the evening of April 16, the assembled army, now being referred to as the "Hallie Riflers", escorted Baxter back to the Anthony House, where he set up his headquarters, and from there he began trying to do the state's business once more.

On April 18, Hercules King Cannon White of Pine Bluff offered militia support to Baxter. He organized three companies of 300 African American troops and brought them to Little Rock by Steamboat and they marched to Anthony House with a brass band. He is reported to have said: "Furnish us simply with the means -- give us the authority -- pronounce the order and I will guarantee to you, sir, that in 25 minutes from the time the order is written, Joseph Brooks will either be in hell or the archives." When this commotion lead to a scuffle in the street that killed an innocent bystander, Baxter asked White to return with his militia to Pine Bluff. However, White became frustrated by inactivity, and on April 30 he commandeered the steamboat Belle of Texas, carrying about 150 militiamen to confront Brooks supporters at New Gascony. After a confrontation at Ashley's gin, White's forces prevailed, capturing around sixty prisoners, including leaders Joseph L. Murphy and Captain Vandesand.

There were now two militias marching and singing through Little Rock as the city became a battleground. Commanding both forces were ex-Confederate soldiers. Former Brigadier-General James F. Fagan commanded the Brooks men, and Robert C. Newton, a former Colonel, commanded the Hallie Riflers, or Baxter's forces. Baxter's men occupied the downstairs billiards area of the Anthony House and patrolled the cross streets outside. Down the street, the Brooks men patrolled the front of the state house. The front line was Main Street. The postmaster handled the situation by only delivering mail addressed to Brooks or Baxter and holding all mail simply addressed to "Governor of Arkansas".

The Lady Baxter, a cannon on permanent display in front of the Old State House, is the most prominent artifact remaining from the Brooks-Baxter war. The cannon is a Confederate copy of a United States Model 1848 64-pounder siege gun 8 in (200 mm) Naval columbiad, designed to fire explosive shells. Originally from a foundry in New Orleans, it was brought to Arkansas in the summer of 1862 by the steamboat "Ponchatrain" and saw action on the Mississippi, White, and Arkansas rivers until it was transferred to Fort Hindman at Arkansas Post. Union forces captured the fort in 1863 but left the cannon behind. It was then brought to Little Rock by Confederates and placed on Hanger Hill overlooking the river to ward off any ships coming upstream, but in this position at least it was never fired. Little Rock was captured in September 1863. Confederates tried to burst the cannon and then, failing that, drove a nail into the touch hole and abandoned it on the shore. It sat there half embedded in the ground until 1874. The Baxter men pulled the cannon out of the soil, repaired it, rechristened it the "Lady Baxter", and made it ready to fire. It was placed in the rear of the Odd Fellows hall, now the Metropolitan Hotel, on the corner of Main and Markham streets to hit any boats bringing supplies for Brooks up the river. The cannon, however, was only fired once, a celebratory blast, when Baxter finally returned to the governor's seat. The war's final casualty was the result of the cannon firing, as the operator was badly injured. It has since been in its current place on brick pedestals in front of the then-state capitol, only briefly threatened by World War II scrap drives.

Overtones of the Civil War and racial conflict were evident. Brooks' men numbered 600 by this time and were all freedmen who supported Republicans as their emancipators. Baxter's forces, all white Democrats, continued to grow steadily during the conflict until they reached nearly 2,000. Several bloody skirmishes occurred. Known as the Battle of Palarm, a small naval battle erupted on the Arkansas River near Natural Steps, where Brooks' men attacked a flatboat known as the "Hallie", thought to be bringing supplies. The shooting lasted around ten to fifteen minutes before the pilot ran up a white flag signaling a surrender. One stray bullet pierced the vessel's supply pipe between the boiler and engine, cutting off its power, and the boat drifted downriver, out of gun range, and lodged on the Southern (Western) shore. Sources vary as to the actual casualties of the incident. The boat's captain, a pilot, and one rifleman were killed; the other pilot and three or four riflemen were wounded. One source stated that the Brooks regiment suffered one man killed and three wounded; another report was that five men were killed and "quite a number" wounded.

Casualty reports vary widely depending on the source; the New York Times of May 30, 1874, gave the following for casualties and fatalities:

| Army | Dead | Wounded |
|---|---|---|
| Baxter militia | 8 | 13 |
| Brooks militia | "about 30" | "upwards of 40" |

=== Brooks loses favor ===
On May 3, men claiming to be acting on behalf of Baxter supporters hijacked a train from Memphis, Tennessee, and arrested federal Court Justices John E. Bennett and Elhanan J. Searle, thinking that the Court would be unable to rule without a quorum of Judges. Baxter denied that they were acting under his direction. The Judges were taken to Benton, Arkansas. For several days, their whereabouts were unknown to the public and federal officials began a search for the Justices. Justice Bennett was able to send a letter to Captain Rose demanding to know why they were being held by the Governor of Arkansas. Upon receipt of the letter, troops were sent to Benton to retrieve the two Justices, but they had escaped by May 6 and made their way to Little Rock.

In Washington, Brooks was supported politically, but Baxter also had support because of the undemocratic way he had been removed from office. President Grant had already dealt with the outcome of the contested election for Governor of Louisiana, the Colfax massacre, where federal troops had to be sent to restore order. As Brooks and Baxter scrambled for support in Washington, D.C., Grant pushed for the dispute to be settled in Arkansas. Baxter demanded the General Assembly be called into session. He knew he had their support, but so did Brooks, so he and his men would not allow anyone to enter the capitol building. Brooks, on the other hand, had the support of the district court. He enlisted Little Rock's premiere lawyer, U. M. Rose, head of the still-prominent Rose Law Firm. However, Grant's decision would soon set in motion the demise of Brooks.

It was becoming clear that federal intervention was required to settle the dispute, despite the general policy of the Grant administration to stay out of the affairs of Southern states. The President often expressed annoyance with Southern governors who requested help from federal troops to combat regular waves of election year violence, with little compassion for the issues they faced. Grant and the United States Attorney General, George Henry Williams, issued a joint communique supporting Baxter and ordering Brooks to vacate the capitol. They also referred the dispute back to the State Legislature.

On May 11, Governor Baxter asked the General Assembly to meet in special session, which they did. Apparently, they met "behind Baxter lines" although where that was is not exactly clear. Since the Speaker of the House and President pro tempore of the Senate were both absent, being that they were both Brooks supporters, they were replaced. J. G. Frierson was elected President pro tempore of the Senate and James H. Berry Speaker of the House. They then passed an act calling for a constitutional convention, which Governor Baxter approved on May 18. The act scheduled an election for the last day of June and appointed delegates from the counties of Arkansas. Two days later, Generals Newton and Fagan negotiated an armistice. At the same time, the Arkansas Supreme Court had finally decided to hear the Brooks case, and voted three to one in favor of Baxter's election, further solidifying the Grant proclamation and Baxter as governor. The bar of the Pulaski County Circuit court also met and issued a resolution that stated that Judge Wytock had acted independently, and his decision did not represent the court. The trial had been deliberately unfair for the defendant Baxter, and the Supreme Court had already ruled that, under the state constitution, the court had no jurisdiction. They rendered Judge Wytock's decision null and void.

On May 19, General Newton and his troops reoccupied the State House grounds, which had just been evacuated by Brooks' forces, and on the 20th, he reinstated Governor Baxter.

== Poland Committee ==
The Poland Committee was a congressional committee established by the U.S. House of Representatives to investigate the situation in Arkansas in the aftermath of the Brooks–Baxter War. It was chaired by Representative Luke P. Poland of Vermont. The committee consisted of three Republicans (Poland, Henry Scudder of New York, and Jasper D. Ward of Illinois) and two Democrats (Representatives Milton Sayler of Ohio and Joseph Sloss of Alabama)

The committee was charged with investigating matters in Arkansas to ascertain whether there was such a republican form of government there as the United States should recognize. Over the course of its investigation, the committee held two hearings in Washington DC.

On February 6, 1875, a report from the majority, reflecting the position of four out of the five members of the committee, was submitted to the United States Congress. This document acknowledged the election of Brooks in the year 1872 but essentially concluded that the opportunity for any remedial action had passed. This determination stemmed from the committee's findings that, despite certain irregularities in the formulation and ratification of the state constitution of 1874, the constitution itself was in alignment with republican principles and had garnered the support of a majority of Arkansas's residents. This situation met the primary standards used by the federal government to assess the legitimacy of state governments, leading to the conclusion that there was no need for federal intervention. The report pointed out that Augustus Garland, who was elected under the 1874 constitution, legitimately occupied the governor's office, rendering any previous claims to the position by Brooks moot. Moreover, the committee acknowledged the lukewarm attitude towards full citizenship rights for African Americans within the state and region but opined that it was improbable that their rights would be actively contested by the white population, thus eliminating the necessity for federal action.

Despite initial support for the Baxter administration, President Ulysses S. Grant sided with a minority report by Congressman Ward of Illinois, who, following a visit to Arkansas facilitated by Senator Stephen Dorsey, a Brooks advocate, suggested that Brooks should be reinstated as governor by federal intervention. Ward's report, influenced by meetings predominantly with Brooks's supporters, contradicted the majority's conclusion, advocating that the 1868 Arkansas Constitution remained in effect, thereby legitimating Brooks's claim to the governorship.

Shortly after the committee's findings were presented to the House, President Grant issued a special message endorsing Brooks as the rightful governor, critiquing the state constitution's reach during a period of constitutional redefinition. Despite Grant's support for Brooks, the House soon passed a resolution backing the committee's majority report, effectively opposing Grant's stance. Faced with limited options and with Augustus Garland already serving as governor since his 1874 election, President Grant ceased further intervention.

== Aftermath ==
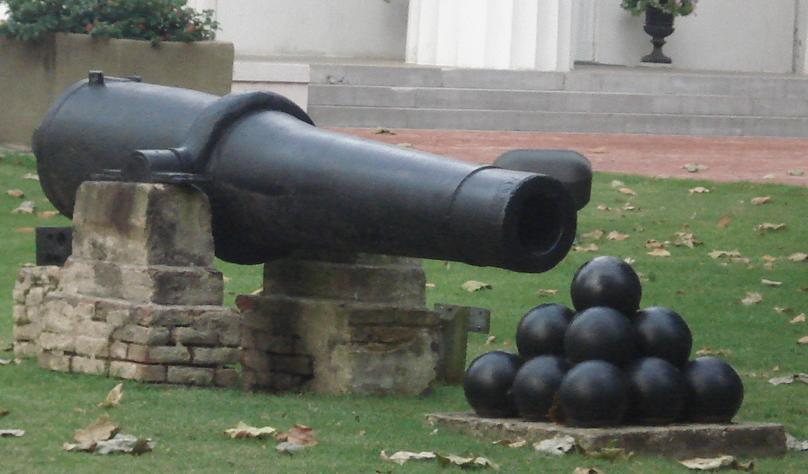
The "Lady Baxter" now sits on the lawn of the Old State House as a monument to the Brooks–Baxter War

In June 1874, Clayton announced that he could no longer control matters in Arkansas and that he and his friends would be willing to enter into any arrangement whereby they could at least be safe from persecution and prosecution. However, the Democrats retaliated by impeaching many Minstrels, including Supreme Court Justice John McClure. Clayton finished his Senate term but was not re-elected.

On September 7, 1874, the new constitution was completed and signed by a majority of delegates. The entire electorate, including the disenfranchised Confederates and the freedmen, voted. The election not only was for ratification of the new constitution but also for state officials that would be elected if the constitution was indeed ratified. The Republicans actually took the same position that the Democrats had taken earlier, believing that the election was illegal they nominated no candidates. Conservative Democrats and allied paramilitary groups suppressed black voting, using a combination of intimidation, blocking blacks from the polls, and outright assassinations. The new constitution was ratified on October 13, 1874, and Democratic officials elected almost unanimously, including new Democratic Governor Augustus H. Garland who was inaugurated November 12, 1874, and Baxter left office after only serving two years of a four-year term.

It was a long time after the Brooks–Baxter War that people of Arkansas allowed another Republican to become governor. The following 35 governors of Arkansas, ruling for a total of 90 years, were all Democrats, until Republican Winthrop Rockefeller became governor in 1966 defeating James D. Johnson. Winthrop became governor while his brother Nelson was governor of New York, while the defeat of Johnson in Arkansas and William M. Rainach in Louisiana ended the once mighty hold of segregation over politics.

Three years later, the two men were part of a krewe known as the Fat Men that led the 1877 Little Rock Mardi Gras parade alongside several other state politicians.

== See also ==
- List of coups and coup attempts by country
- 1899 Kentucky gubernatorial election
