= Constitution of Arkansas =

American state constitution

Overview
- Jurisdiction: State of Arkansas
- Created: September 7, 1874
- Presented: September 13, 1874
- Ratified: October 30, 1874
- Date effective: November 10, 1874

Government structure
- Branches: 3
- Chambers: Bicameral
- Executive: Governor
- Judiciary: Supreme, Appeals, Circuits, Districts

History
- First legislature: November 10, 1874
- First executive: November 12, 1874
- Amendments: 102
- Last amended: November 3, 2020
- Location: Arkansas State Archives
- Commissioned by: Arkansas General Assembly
- Author: Little Rock Convention
- Supersedes: 1868 Constitution of Arkansas

Full text
- Arkansas Constitution of 1874 at Wikisource

The Constitution of Arkansas is the primary organizing law for the U.S. state of Arkansas delineating the duties, powers, structures, and functions of the state government. Arkansas' original constitution was adopted at a constitutional convention held at Little Rock in advance of the territory's admission to the Union in 1836. In 1861 a constitution was adopted with secession. After the American Civil War its 1864 constitution was drafted. An 1868 constitution was passed to comply with the Reconstruction acts. The current constitution was ratified in 1874 following the Brooks–Baxter War.

The Brooks–Baxter War and passage of the new constitution are considered to mark the end of Reconstruction in Arkansas. This was two years before the disputed 1876 U.S. presidential election and national compromise that resulted in the Republican government withdrawing federal troops from the South. The state has passed numerous amendments to the 1874 Constitution – 102 as of 2020.

By gaining passage of the Election Law of 1891 and a poll tax amendment in the general election of 1892, the Democratic Party consolidated its control of state politics over Republicans and a farmer-labor coalition; effectively disenfranchising most African Americans. By 1895 there were none in the state house; their exclusion from politics lasted for decades deep into the 20th century.

== Current Constitution ==
=== Preamble ===
We, the People of the State of Arkansas, grateful to Almighty God for the privilege of choosing our own form of government; for our civil and religious liberty; and desiring to perpetuate its blessings, and secure the same to our selves and posterity; do ordain and establish this Constitution.

=== Article I ===
This article establishes the boundaries of Arkansas as running from the Mississippi river on the east to the Oklahoma and Texas borders on the west, and bound by Missouri in the north and Louisiana in the south. This article also defines the seat of government as being in Little Rock.

=== Article II ===
For the most part, this article affirms the same limits to the State Government that are similarly constrained by the US Constitution to the Government of the United States.

=== Article III ===
Article 3 mandates that all elections shall be fair and equal. No person shall be denied the right to vote. Any resident citizen over the age of 18 may register and vote. Electors are exempt from arrest while they are traveling to and from elections. Soldiers may not vote on the basis of being stationed in Arkansas: they must establish residency through other means.

=== Article IV ===
This article states that there will be 3 branches of government, legislative, judicial, and executive.

=== Article V ===
Article 5 provides for the operations of the Arkansas General Assembly. It requires the Assembly to meet biennially (Section 5) and limits these meetings to 60 days unless otherwise approved by two-thirds of both houses (Section 17). Section 4 sets the qualifications for members. Amendment 86 allows for biennial fiscal sessions in even-numbered years; these sessions are limited to legislative deliberation regarding the state budget, though other issues may be brought before the houses via approval of a two-thirds vote of the membership.

Section 1 allows for passage of laws or constitutional amendments by initiative. Petitions require signatures equal to eight percent of registered voters to appear on the ballot for a law, or ten percent for a constitutional amendment (see below). Section 1 also allows, by six percent of voters placing a petition, for a statewide referendum on any law or any part of a law. The petition must be filed no later than 90 days after final adjournment of the Assembly. The law is suspended until it is voted on in the next election; if part of a law, the portion subject to referendum is suspended while all other provisions remain in effect.

It also includes highly restrictive provisions regarding appropriations:

- Section 30 requires that the "general appropriations bill" be limited to the "ordinary expenses of the executive, legislative, and judicial departments of the State". All other appropriations must be passed by special appropriations bills. However, each bill can embrace only one subject; thus, hundreds of bills must be passed to fund other State agencies.
- Section 38 requires, in order to raise "property, excise, privilege or personal taxes ... now levied", either 1) approval of the voters or 2) a three-fourths majority of the legislature. However, since Arkansas' sales tax was added after passage of the Section (which was added by Amendment), it does not fall under the "now levied" provision, and thus can be increased by a simple majority.
- Section 39 places restrictions on funding. Except for "educational purposes, highway purposes, to pay Confederate pensions and the just debts of the State", no appropriations exceeding $2.5 million can be passed without a three-fourths majority. In recent years, this means that nearly every appropriation bill (including the general bill) requires such.
- Section 40 further requires that the general appropriations bill must be passed before any special appropriations bill can be passed. Otherwise, no appropriations are valid.

An example of how the restrictions can wreak havoc took place in 1989, when the general appropriations bill (which far exceeded $2.5 million) failed to gain the required three-fourths majority, but was "declared passed" by the General Assembly under the "just debts of the State" exemption, and all subsequent special appropriations bills were passed thereafter. However, the Arkansas Supreme Court disagreed with the Assembly's use of the just debts provision. As a result, it declared every single appropriations bill of the session unconstitutional—the general bill did not receive the votes needed to pass under Section 39, and under Section 40 all other appropriations bills were invalid since the general bill must be passed first—requiring the Assembly to return in special session to reenact them.

Appropriations do not constitute the state budget in Arkansas; that is enacted near the end of the session, when the Revenue Stabilization Law, which provides the mechanism for distributing the state's revenue (even general revenues), is amended to reflect the submitted budget. Any appropriation not funded by the Revenue Stabilization Law is essentially null and void. Some observers believe that the Revenue Stabilization Act, while strict in its implementation, has prevented the state from suffering the financial difficulties of other states with less-strict preventive measures to avoid deficit spending.

== Constitutional Conventions ==
The State of Arkansas has held eight Constitutional Conventions: 1836, 1861, 1864, 1868, 1874, 1917, 1969, and 1979. Despite this, the state has only had five constitutions in its history, those of 1836, 1861 (which only changed "United States of America" to "Confederate States of America"), 1864, 1868, and 1874.

Arkansas has held three constitutional conventions (called the Sixth, Seventh, and Eight Constitutional Conventions, respectively) since 1874. None of these drafts were ratified.

=== 1836 Constitutional Convention ===
In 1833, much of Arkansas was eager to be admitted as a state, but leaders of the prominent Conway-Johnson family had concerns about the taxation necessary to support state government on a low population, as well as political concerns. But when Michigan was preparing to enter the Union as a free state, Ambrose Sevier rose in the United States Congress to apply for statehood. Congress was hesitant to admit another pro-slavery state due to the tense equality achieved under the Missouri Compromise, but when paired with a free state, the balance of power in the United States Senate would not be upset. The 9th Arkansas Territorial General Assembly appropriated $60 for rent and $6 for firewood, (a total of $2,200 in today's dollars) to territorial governor William Fulton to host a constitutional convention.

Following the General Assembly's bill authorizing a constitutional convention, Fulton tried to halt the convention, but Attorney General, Benjamin F. Butler ruled the assemblage legal. The General Assembly fought over apportionment of delegates between the two "halves" of the state: the upland northwest with a largely white population, and the agrarian southeast, with an economy and society based on slavery and plantation agriculture, who sought to adopt an apportionment where slaves counted as three-fifths of the free white population, mirroring the three-fifths Compromise. David Walker led the northwest in ultimately counting only free white population in the apportionment of districts; with 26 delegates from the northwest and 26 from the southeast.

Convening in Little Rock on January 4, 1836, the convention quickly sought to re-litigate apportionment, this time for the Arkansas Senate. Ultimately, a compromise was reached giving the northwest and southeast regions eight senators each, with one from central Arkansas (Pulaski, Saline, and White counties). The constitution was viewed as a democratic document for the period. The legislature was the most powerful branch; it selected US Senators, supreme court and circuit judges, and all state offices other than governor. It could override a gubernatorial veto with a simple majority and had no term limits imposed on members. The governor had four-year terms but was limited to serving eight years in every twelve. State representatives and county officials were elected by popular vote. Only white males were allowed to vote, but there was no property ownership requirement and poll taxes were banned except for raising funds for county government. It was ratified by the convention on January 30, 1836, with all delegates except Walker and Nathan Ross (the Mississippi County delegate who did not attend the convention) signing the document.

Delegate Charles F.M. Noland was selected to messenger the constitution to Washington D.C. for congressional approval. He did not arrive until March 8; Sevier instead presented a duplicate printed in the Arkansas Gazette to Congress on February 4 to begin discussion and debate. After passing both houses of Congress, on June 15 of that year, President Andrew Jackson signed the act making Arkansas the 25th state.

=== 1861 Constitution ===
The first constitution was vague and short. The second Arkansas state constitution was adopted by the Arkansas Secession Convention when Arkansas seceded from the Union on May 6, 1861. This constitution was very similar to the original except for its references to The Confederate States of America and added protections for slavery.

=== 1864 Constitution ===
On December 8, 1863, by United States President Abraham Lincoln issued a presidential proclamation that would come to be known as the ten percent plan to allow Confederate states to return to the Union. The Civil War was still underway in Arkansas, with a Confederate-loyal state government in exile at Washington, Arkansas and much of the northern part of the state under a tenuous Federal control. The economy of Arkansas was in shambles and guerrilla warfare ravaged the countryside and small towns throughout the war.

Major General Frederick Steele began reorganizing a state government following the Battle of Bayou Fourche, whereby Federals captured Little Rock. By January 1864, the requisite 10% of the state's voters had taken the loyalty oath to the Constitution necessary to begin preparing for restoration to the Union. Arkansas Unionists from 24 of the state's 57 counties met for a constitutional convention in Little Rock. Since the convention was not called by a formal body, representation was not apportioned in advance, and some counties were not represented at all.

Of the 24 convention members, a group of 12 were selected to draft the new constitution. The convention adopted a provisional document largely similar to the 1836 constitution, except repudiated slavery and secession, and declaring the constitution of 1861 "null and void". Slavery was abolished in this constitution, but there was no provision as to civil rights for freedmen, or former slaves. This was the first constitution to allow popular election of the constitutional offices (secretary of state, auditor, treasurer, and the newly created position of lieutenant governor of Arkansas) as well as judges.

The convention sent the Constitution to a vote of the people on March 18, 1864, alongside a new slate of Republican state officials. Some areas of the state remained under Confederate control during the election, and many war-torn areas were virtual no-man's land. Despite a turnout of slightly more than 12,000 total voters, the Constitution was adopted and new officials were installed.

Approval of Constitution
Choice	Votes	%
For	12,177	97.86
Against	266	2.14
Total	12,443	100.00

=== 1868 Constitution ===
Congress's 1867 Reconstruction Acts followed passage of the 13th and 14th Amendments emancipating slaves and making them citizens. The 1867 Acts required former Confederate states to recognize former slaves as citizens, and to adopt constitutions providing suffrage for freedmen.

In late 1867 Arkansas elected delegates to a new Constitutional Convention, which took place in early 1868 in the old capital building in Little Rock. At that Convention, the delegates drafted a new Constitution. It was adopted by popular referendum in the spring of 1868. That June Arkansas became the first rebel state to be readmitted to the Union under the Reconstruction Acts. The Constitution of 1868 made racial discrimination illegal; provided suffrage (voting) rights for freedmen age 21 and older; provided for public schools for the first time, for both black and white children; and it established a state university.

=== 1874 Constitutional Convention ===
Following the political realignment surrounding the Brooks-Baxter War that brought the end of Reconstruction in Arkansas, unreconstructed Democrats returned to power in the General Assembly. Having chafed under Republican rule since the end of the Civil War, one of the principal goals of Democrats upon returning to power was to undo many provisions of the 1868 constitution, especially weakening the executive branch. The General Assembly submitted a call for a constitutional convention to the people of Arkansas on June 30, 1874, which passed overwhelmingly, with delegates selected during the same election.

Call for Constitutional Convention
Choice	Votes	%
For	80,259	90.38
Against	8,547	9.62
Total	88,806	100.00

Delegates convened in the house chamber of the Old State House on July 14, 1874. Of the 91 delegates, 70 were Democrats, with many having held office in the antebellum period, having ties to the powerful Conway-Johnson family, or held office in the Confederate States of America government. Grandison Royston was elected president of the convention, Augustus H. Garland served as a legal advisor and instrumental force behind the new constitution.

This version reflects attitudes related to the war and its aftermath. The delegates gave the most power to county governments, including for legal issues, transportation, taxation and spending. The power of the governor was significantly curtailed. State officials' terms were dropped from four years to two years, and more state positions were required to be filled by popular election, rather than appointment by the governor. This is the constitution that the state uses today, with some 87 amendments and various other changes. The constitution produced was ratified by voters and remains the state's constitution.

Approval of Constitution
Choice	Votes	%
For	78,697	76.03
Against	24,807	23.97
Total	103,504	100.00

== Amending the Constitution ==
Arkansas has passed numerous amendments – 102 at last count. The current Constitution allows for two methods of amendment. However, each method is shown in a separate section.

Under Section 22 of Article 19, either house of the General Assembly may propose amendments. The amendment requires majority approval of both houses in a recorded vote, publication in at least one newspaper in each county for six months prior to the next election of the Assembly, and majority approval of the voters. However, the Section places further restrictions on legislative amendments, requiring each amendment to appear separately on the ballot and limiting the number per ballot to three.

Under Section 1 of Article 5 (as amended by Amendment 7), ten percent of legal voters may propose an amendment by initiative, requiring majority approval of the voters. The proposed amendment must be filed with the Arkansas Secretary of State not less than four months before the election, and 30 days prior to the election the petitioners (at their own expense) must publish the amendment "in some paper of general circulation". Unlike legislative amendments, there are no limits on the number of amendments by initiative that may be proposed on any one ballot.

== Ratified amendments ==
In addition to the 20 Articles listed above, 102 amendments have been added. Though some amendments have been physically incorporated into the text of the Constitution (e.g. Amendment 1, adding Article 20 and Amendment 90, incorporated changes made to Amendment 82), others remain physically separate from the text.

Notable amendments shown separately include:

- Amendment to establish a Poll tax be paid as a requirement for voter registration. Passed in 1892, this amendment together with the Election Law of 1891 strengthened Democratic Party power. The Election Law centralized power at the state election board, in contrast to other efforts to decentralize power in the state as represented in the constitution.
- Amendment 34, which provides for the right to work (only Arizona, Florida, Mississippi, and Oklahoma have similar constitutional provisions).
- Amendment 35, § 1: Creation of the Arkansas Game and Fish Commission.
- Amendment 44, which allowed the government to nullify Federal integration laws. Overturned on 1989 by a Federal court, a referendum in the following year, 1990 Arkansas Amendment 3, deleted this amendment.
- Amendment 46, which allows for horse racing pari-mutuel betting, but only in Hot Springs, the location of Oaklawn Park (there is no similar constitutional amendment relating to dog racing, though Southland Greyhound Park operates in West Memphis.)
- Amendment 68, which states that "[t]he policy of Arkansas is to protect the life of every unborn child from conception to birth, to the extent permitted by the Federal Constitution." This provision allows Arkansas to restrict the practice of abortion, now that Roe v. Wade has been overturned by the United States Supreme Court.
- Amendment 73, which places term limits on Arkansas officeholders. Section 3 also placed limits on Arkansas's Congressional delegation, but it was found unconstitutional by the U.S. Supreme Court in U.S. Term limits, Inc. v. Thornton (1995), which ruled that states could not pass laws for Congressional officeholders that were more restrictive than those in the US Constitution. Section 4 placed a severability clause so the remainder of the amendment would remain in force.
- Amendment 75 (Environmental Enhancement Funds) to the constitution provides an additional excise tax of one-eighth of one percent (1 /8 of 1%) with forty-five percent of the proceeds to be allocated to the Arkansas Game and Fish Commission's "Game Protection Fund".
- Amendment 83 Denies recognition to all forms of same-sex unions.
- Amendment 84 Authorizes bingo and raffles for charitable purposes. Passed in 2006
- Amendment 86 Authorizes the General Assembly to meet in general sessions in odd-numbered years and fiscal sessions during even-numbered years
- Amendment 87 Authorizes a statewide lottery. Passed in 2008.
- Amendment 88 Guarantees the right of Arkansans to hunt, fish and trap. Passed in 2010.

== Criticisms ==
Section 13 originally set the state's usury limit at 10%; it was amended in the early 1980s to 5% above the Federal Reserve Discount Rate on 90-day commercial paper (see the latest rates), but falling interest rates and poorly worded provisions made the amended version more onerous than the original. For example, a clause in the 1980s amendment appears to set a 17% limit for consumer loans; but since they were not exempted from the main "5% above discount rate" provision, the courts ruled that the limit for consumer loans was the lesser of the two clauses, usually the 5% rule. Also, other language in the amendment applying the usury limit "at the time of the contract" made floating-rate loans extremely difficult, even though the usury limit was a floating rate. Neither the original nor amended provisions allowed the legislature to make any exceptions to the general usury law, as happened in other states. The Arkansas legislature tried to permit payday loans anyway, but after two adverse decisions in 2008, the Attorney General ordered all payday lenders in the state to shut down.

After out-of-state banks took over most lending in Arkansas, banks located in the state received special relief from the usury law through Section 731 of the Federal Gramm-Leach-Bliley Act in 1999. Also in that year, an Arkansas Supreme Court decision allowed out-of-state auto finance companies to engage in subprime lending through Arkansas dealerships without violating the usury law. Today, only a handful of loans made to Arkansans are still subject to this law, mainly private-party lending and some prime auto loans from companies such as GMAC and Ford Credit.

This unique and unusual article (added by Amendment 1) prohibits the General Assembly from making appropriations for payment of principal and interest on several bond issues from 1869 to 1871, commonly referred to as Holford bonds. They were passed during Reconstruction by the General Assembly. Some of the bonds refinanced disputed debt outstanding from shortly after Arkansas' statehood in 1836. These bonds had been central to the Brooks-Baxter War.

Article 19 in Section 1, titled "Atheists disqualified from holding office or testifying as witness", states "No person who denies the being of a God shall hold any office in the civil departments of this State, nor be competent to testify as a witness in any court."

This is also inconsistent with Section 26 in Article 2, which states that no religious test shall be applied as a requirement to vote or hold office – Article 19 in Section 1 would be classified as such, but there are no known cases of this article being enforced in modern times. Further, since religious freedom is provided for in the United States Constitution's Bill of Rights, any attempt to do so would be struck down in court.

In addition, Article Six of the United States Constitution is also considered to prohibit such religious tests: "no religious Test shall ever be required as a Qualification to any Office or public Trust under the United States." Not only does the wording of this amendment specifically bar Congress from restricting freedom of religion, but current legal precedent holds that these provisions and the rest of the United States Bill of Rights are binding on the states under the Liberty Clause of the 14th Amendment to the federal Constitution.
