= U. M. Rose =

American lawyer (1834–1913)

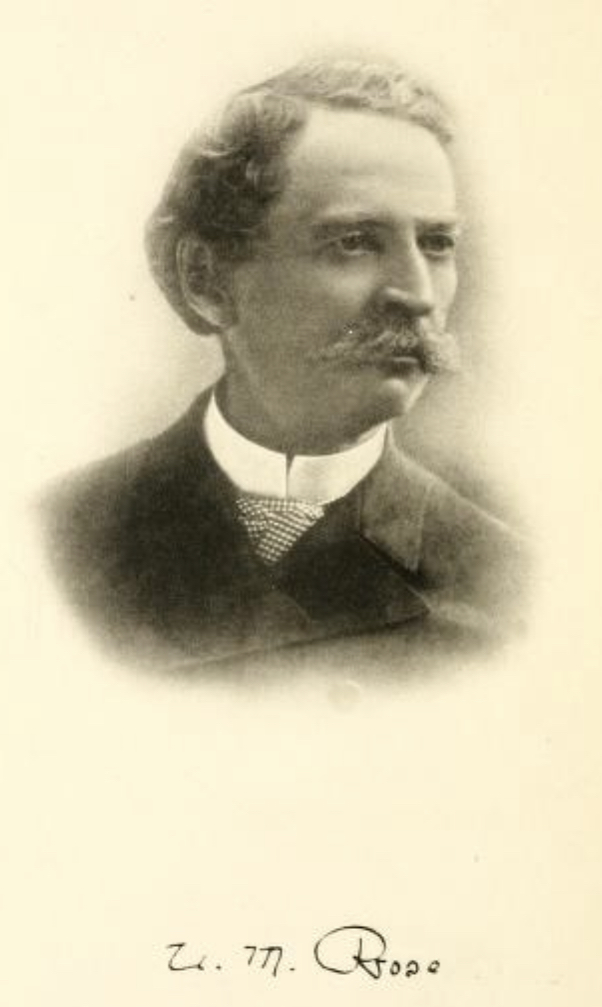
Photographic portrait of Rose from Addresses of U.M. Rose : with a brief memoir (1914)

Uriah Milton Rose (March 5, 1834 – August 12, 1913) was an American lawyer and Confederate sympathizer. "Approachable, affable, and kind," graceful and courteous, he was called "the most scholarly lawyer in America" and "one of the leading legal lights of the nation", "a towering figure in the...life of Little Rock". He was a founder of the American Bar Association, of which he was twice president, 1891–92 and 1901-02.

Another Arkansas judge, J. T. Coston, described him thus:

Arkansas is the home of the late U. M. Rose, a scholar and statesman. Judge Rose was one of the great lawyers not only of Arkansas but of the United States. Cultured, refined and modest as a woman, with a titanic intellect, he was a general favorite wherever he was known. Judge Dillon, after being thrown with him on numerous occasions at long intervals, pronounced Judge Rose the most cultured man he had ever known. He loved his profession, and I heard him state only a year or two before he died, while attending the Arkansas Bar Association, that during his more than half a century experience in the practice of law he had never had a serious misunderstanding with a brother lawyer.

President Theodore Roosevelt called him "the brainiest man I have ever met".

== Childhood and personal life ==
Rose was born in Bradfordsville, Kentucky, on a farm of 300 or 400 acres, on March 5, 1834, son of Joseph and Nancy Rose. His father was a physician and a Campbellite. He was his parents' third son and had two half-siblings from his father's first marriage to a Miss Armstrong from Pittsburgh, Pennsylvania. As there was no school in Bradfordsville, he was taught by a tutor; he was studying Latin at age five and later remarked that he could not remember when he could not read. He studied French and German with Europeans who happened to be in Bradfordsville. His mother died in 1848 and his father in 1849. Since his father's estate was worth less than his debts, "the children were thrown out". Rose then worked in the village store, where he also resided. When this did not leave him time to study, he resigned and worked on a farm, as a field hand, for board and $5 a month.

When Rose was 17, lawyer Rutherford Harrison Roundtree, who met him when visiting the farm, hired him as a deputy county clerk, and gave him "a home in his house" in Lebanon, Kentucky. There, he "learned a great deal about legal forms" and attended court, hearing the locally-famous attorneys Ben Hardin and Joshua F. Bell. To advance his legal education he enrolled at Transylvania University in Lexington, Kentucky. "When Judge Rose, no more than a youth, presented himself for admission to the school, he impressed Justice Robertson so much with his earnestness and apparent willingness to learn, that Justice Robertson took him to live at his own splendid mansion. It was while at Justice Robertson's home that Judge Rose met Henry Clay, Webster, and many other of the prominent men of the time." He graduated in six months.

On October 25, 1853, Rose married Margaret T. Gibbs, daughter of William Gibbs, who was a grandson of George Washington's aide and bodyguard Caleb Gibbs.

Rose "disliked his first name intensely and never used his first name when he could avoid it".

== Career ==
=== In Batesville ===
After graduating in 1853, in search of warmer weather, Rose, his new wife, and his brother-in-law William T. Gibbs moved to Batesville, Arkansas, in 1853. He set up a law practice there in partnership with Gibbs. The Roses had three children. "The couple bought a house on the north side of Main Street, between Third and Fourth Streets, and U. M. Rose rented a small building next door to use as an office." ("He lived on the lot now [1935] occupied by a filling station just across the street from where the Crouch furniture store is now l[oca]ted. His law office was located in his yard.") Rose subsequently moved his practice to Washington, Arkansas.

In 1860, he was appointed chancellor (chancery judge and chief county officer) of Pulaski County; "county judges in Arkansas have served for decades as one of the strongest political forces in the state." "The [Pulaski County] chancellor's office was the only such office in the state and thus had statewide jurisdiction." He held this position until Union forces captured the state capital on September 1, 1863. Although initially opposed to secession, on the practical ground that the South could not win a war against the North, he backed the Confederacy throughout the Civil War. (Both he and his brother-in-law each owned a slave, though his ran away.) He took an oath to support the Confederacy, without which he could not have continued as a state judge; when briefly captured by Union forces that occupied Batesville, he refused to swear allegiance to the Federal government. The Confederacy named him state historian. He moved with the pro-Confederate Arkansas government to Washington, Arkansas in 1863, following the fall of Little Rock. Rose, "along with all men who had the welfare of the state at heart", "worked hard" to convince Arkansas voters not to ratify the Reconstruction Constitution. (As a Confederate loyalist, he had lost the right to vote.) He was chairman of the Resolutions Committee of the state Democratic party, determined "to preserve 'White Man's government in a White Man's country". (His wife was later active in the Daughters of the Confederacy.)

=== In Little Rock ===
The end of the Confederacy meant the end of his position as judge. Moving to Little Rock in 1865, where he and his wife had four additional children, he set up a law partnership, much later to become the Rose Law Firm, with George C. Watkins (1815–1872), former chief justice of Arkansas. This lasted until Watkins' retirement, five years later. He then brought in John Green, who died suddenly in May 1875. His son George B. Rose then became associated with him, under the firm name of U. M. & G. B. Rose. In 1893 Wilson Hemingway, associate justice of the Arkansas Supreme Court since 1889, resigned from the court to join them. In 1905, the firm merged with Cantrell and Loughborough, and the partners adopted the named Rose, Hemingway, Cantrell, and Loughborough, which remained the name of the firm long after Rose's death. The firm did not become the Rose Law Firm until 1980; no Rose has been associated with the firm since George's death in 1942.

He was offered a position as U.S. Senator but declined, saying "I have no love of political life. I have seen much of it at a distance. I regard it for the most part as a sham and a delusion, and often it is a shame and a disgrace."

A man of learning in the law, science, and literature, Rose knew both German and French; poems translated by him from the French of Sully Prudhomme and the German of Goethe and Schiller were published posthumously. When faced with a colonial document, he "exhibited a degree of almost perfect familiarity with Spanish". He was "deeply versed in the classics", and was also a noted and "enthralling" public speaker. In 1872 was the first of several trips to Europe, in which he visited Italy, Austria, Scandinavia, Russia, and Turkey; he also visited Mexico.

His library, which his widow donated to the Little Rock Public Library, contained over 8,000 volumes, including almost 2,000 books in French and German; there are two published catalogues of it. He was the organizer of the Arkansas Bar Association, whose first meeting was in his office, and its president from 1899 to 1900; he was a charter member of the American Bar Association and its president from 1891 to 1892 and again 1901 to 1902. President Theodore Roosevelt appointed him U.S. ambassador to the Second Peace Conference at The Hague in 1907. In preparation for that responsibility he spent time in Washington, D.C., where he was "a daily caller at [the] White House".

Rose died at his home at 620 West 3rd St., Little Rock, Arkansas, on August 12, 1913, as a consequence of a fall. "The funeral was attended perhaps by the largest number ever gathered on a similar occasion." People attended from "every section of the state". State offices were closed by the governor so employees could attend the funeral.

He and his wife had nine children who survived to adulthood, in order of birth: John M. Rose (1855-1915), an attorney who practiced next door to his father but not in partnership with him, William G. Rose of Butler and Independence, Missouri (1857–1941), his partner George B. Rose (1860–1942), Janata Rose "Fanny" Dickinson of Little Rock (1863–1932), Lawrence (1866, died in infancy), Ellen Rose Gibbon or Gibbons of Los Angeles (1867–1915), Emma Rose Coleman (1870–1907), Charles C. Rose of Little Rock (1872–1954), Prof. Lewis Henry Rose of the University of Arkansas and of Chicago (1874–1921), and Mrs. (Jessie Rose) Hay Watson Smith of Brooklyn, N.Y., and Little Rock (1877-1953). His son George was "known and honored not only as a most successful lawyer, but as a litterateur, art critic and scholar." His grandson U.M. Rose was president of the New Mexico Bar Association.

== Legacy ==
Rose was the only delegate from Arkansas among the 75 lawyers who formed the American Bar Association in Saratoga Springs, New York in 1872. He was president from 1891 to 1892 and again from 1901 to 1902.

In 1882, at his suggestion, 68 lawyers from across the state formed the Arkansas State Bar Association. "Rose was elected chairman of the association's first executive committee and, between 1898 and 1899, served as president."

In 1916, a new U.M. Rose School was opened at 13th and State Streets in Little Rock. It became a central building of Little Rock Junior College when that institution was founded in 1927; when the Junior College became the University of Arkansas at Little Rock and moved to a larger campus, the former campus was used by Philander Smith College, where the building is currently (2019) the James M. Cox Administration Building.

In 1917, the state of Arkansas donated a marble statue of Rose to the U.S. Capitol's National Statuary Hall Collection. In 2019 the decision was made to replace his statue, and that of James Paul Clarke, with statues of Johnny Cash and Daisy Lee Gatson Bates. Arkansas state Sen. David Wallace, the lead sponsor of the bill to replace Rose, cited Rose's perceived lack of name recognition in the present day, saying his "time has faded".

In 1944, a United States Liberty ship named the SS Uriah M. Rose was launched. She was scrapped in 1972.

== Published writings ==
- Rose, Uriah M. (1867). Digest of the Arkansas Reports. Little Rock.
- Rose, U.M. (1891). The Constitution of the State of Arkansas: framed and adopted by the convention which assembled at Little Rock, July 14, 1874, and ratified by the people of the state at the election held October 13th, 1874, with an appendix, containing the Constitution of the United States, and the constitutions of Arkansas of 1836, 1861, 1864 and 1868; with notes by U.M. Rose. Little Rock.
- Rose, U. M. (1893). "The Law of Trusts and Strikes". Annual Report of the American Bar Association. pp. 287–321.
- Rose, U.M. (1896). "The Present State of the Law". Report of the Eighth Annual Meeting of the Virginia State Bar Association. Richmond, Va.: 183–206.
- Rose, U. M. (1903). "Address of U.M. Rose". In Dillon, John Forrest (ed.). John Marshall; life, character and judicial services as portrayed in the centenary and memorial addresses and proceedings throughout the United States on Marshall day, 1901. Chicago: Callaghan & Company. pp. 9–28.
- Rose, U. M. (1903). "Comments on the Cases of Marbury [Marbury v. Madison] and Cohens [Cohens v. Virginia], and on the Trial of [Aaron] Burr". In Dillon, John Forrest (ed.). John Marshall; life, character and judicial services as portrayed in the centenary and memorial addresses and proceedings throughout the United States on Marshall day, 1901. Chicago: Callaghan & Company. pp. 115–135.
- Rose, Uriah M. (1908). "The Magna Charta [sic]. The concluding part of an address before the Pennsylvania Bar Association, June 25, 1901". In DuBois, Edwin (ed.). Oratory of the South. From the Civil War to the Present Time. New York and Washington: New York, Washington, The Neale publishing company. pp. 318–323.
- Rose, U.M. (March 13, 1904). "Anti-Third Term Rule Is Firmly Established in Our Government". Arkansas Democrat. p. 15.
- Rose, U.M. (1911). "Chester Ashley". Publications of the Arkansas Historical Association. 3.
- Rose, U.M.; Rose, George B. (1914). Addresses of U.M. Rose: with a brief memoir. Includes Memoir of U. M. Rose, pp. 7–12, and George B. Rose, pp. 12–33. Chicago: G.I. Jones.
