= List of United States federal courthouses in Arkansas =

This is a list of current and former courthouses of the United States federal court system located in Arkansas. Each courthouse entry of the United States federal court system indicates the name of the building, placed in a table alongside its depiction (a photo, if available), its location, and the jurisdiction it serves. The dates during which a courthouse was used within a jurisdiction and, if applicable, the person for whom it was named, as well as the date of any renaming constitute the remaining tabular column entries. Dates of use will not necessarily correspond with the dates of construction or demolition of a building, as pre-existing structures have been on occasion adapted for court use, and former court buildings have been relegated to other uses. Also, the official name of the building may have changed at some point after its use as a federal court building.

== Courthouses ==
Courthouse	City	Image	Street address	Jurisdiction	First used	Last used	Named for
U.S. Post Office and Courthouse	Batesville		368 East Main Street	E.D. Ark.	1907	?	Now the Independence County Library.
U.S. Post Office & Courthouse	El Dorado		101 South Jackson Avenue	W.D. Ark.	1931	present	
John Paul Hammerschmidt Federal Building	Fayetteville		35 East Mountain Street	W.D. Ark.	?	present	Named after U.S. Rep. John Paul Hammerschmidt.
U.S. Post Office & Court House	Fort Smith		Rogers Avenue and Sixth Street	W.D. Ark.	1897	1936	Building completed in 1889; razed in 1936.
Judge Isaac C. Parker Federal Building^{†}	Fort Smith		30 South 6th Street	W.D. Ark.	1937	present	Named after District Court judge Isaac C. Parker.
U.S. Post Office & Courthouse	Harrison		201 North Main Street	W.D. Ark.	1906	?	Now in use by Boone County.
J. Smith Henley Federal Building	Harrison		402 North Walnut Street	W.D. Ark.	?	present	Named after District Court and Court of Appeals judge Jesse Smith Henley. (2001)
U.S. Post Office & Court House	Helena		Northeast corner Porter & Cherry Sts.	E.D. Ark.	1893	1961	Fate of building unknown.
Jacob Trieber Federal Building, U.S. Post Office, and U.S. Court House	Helena–West Helena		617 Walnut Street	E.D. Ark.	1961	present	Named after Jacob Trieber.
U.S. Courthouse^{†}	Hot Springs		100 Reserve Street	W.D. Ark.	?	present	
E.C. Gathings Federal Building and United States Courthouse	Jonesboro		615 South Main Street	E.D. Ark.	1960	present	Named after Arkansas Congressman Ezekiel C. Gathings.
Old U.S. Post Office & Courthouse^{†}	Little Rock		300 West 2nd Street	E.D. Ark. W.D. Ark.	1881	present	
Richard Sheppard Arnold U.S. Courthouse†	Little Rock		600 West Capitol Avenue	E.D. Ark.	1932	present	Named after Court of Appeals judge Richard S. Arnold in 2003.
George Howard Jr. Federal Building & U.S. Courthouse	Pine Bluff		100 East 8th Avenue	E.D. Ark.	1966	present	Named after District Court judge George Howard Jr.
U.S. Courthouse and Post Office	Texarkana		State Line, Olive, Fifth, Elm	E.D. Tex. W.D. Ark.	1892	1930	Straddled the line between Texas and Arkansas, with facilities for both jurisdictions. Razed in 1930.
U.S. Post Office & Courthouse^{†}	Texarkana		500 North State Line Avenue	E.D. Tex. W.D. Ark.	1933	present	This building straddles the state line between Arkansas and Texas; it is the only U.S. federal building to occupy two states.

== Key ==
^{†}	Listed on the National Register of Historic Places (NRHP)
^{††}	NRHP-listed and also designated as a National Historic Landmark
