= D. Price Marshall Jr. =

American judge (born 1963)

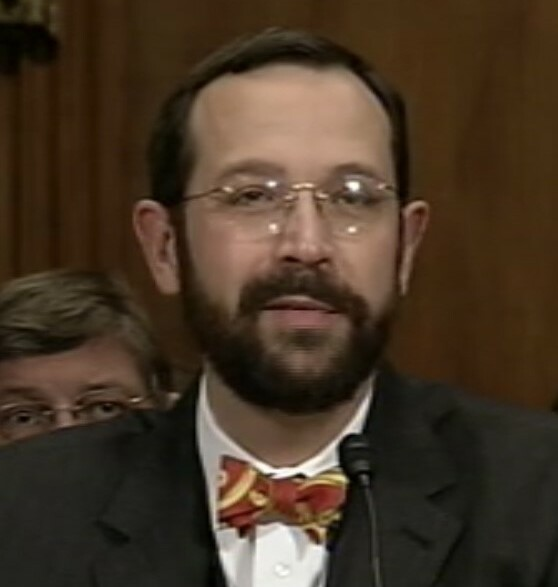
- Marshall in 2010

Chief Judge of the United States District Court for the Eastern District of Arkansas
- In office July 23, 2019 – December 18, 2023
- Preceded by: Brian S. Miller
- Succeeded by: Kristine Baker

Judge of the United States District Court for the Eastern District of Arkansas
- Incumbent
- Assumed office May 6, 2010
- Appointed by: Barack Obama
- Preceded by: Billy Roy Wilson

Personal details
- Born: Denzil Price Marshall Jr. July 20, 1963 (age 62) Memphis, Tennessee, U.S.
- Education: Arkansas State University (BA); London School of Economics (MSc); Harvard University (JD)

Denzil Price Marshall Jr. (born July 20, 1963) is a United States district judge of the United States District Court for the Eastern District of Arkansas.

== Early life and education ==
Born in Memphis, Tennessee, Marshall earned a Bachelor of Arts degree in 1985 from Arkansas State University, where he was a member of Tau Kappa Epsilon fraternity, and a Master of Science degree in 1987 from the London School of Economics. In 1989, Marshall earned a Juris Doctor from the Harvard Law School.

== Career ==
From 1989 until 1991, Marshall served as a law clerk for Judge Richard S. Arnold on the United States Court of Appeals for the Eighth Circuit. From 1991 until 1995, Marshall served as an associate with Barrett & Deacon in Jonesboro, Arkansas. From 1995 until 2006, Marshall was a principal at the law firm. In 2006, Marshall became an associate judge on the Arkansas Court of Appeals. Marshall also teaches as a member of adjunct faculty at Arkansas State University.

=== Federal judicial service ===
After Barack Obama was elected president, Marshall interviewed with Arkansas Senator Blanche Lincoln about a vacant federal district court slot on December 29, 2008. On March 12, 2009, Lincoln and Arkansas Senator Mark Pryor told Marshall that he and others would be recommended to the White House for consideration. On December 3, 2009, Obama formally nominated Marshall to the seat, to replace Judge Billy Roy Wilson, who assumed senior status in October 2008. The United States Senate Committee on the Judiciary reported Marshall's nomination to the full Senate on February 11, 2010. The United States Senate confirmed Marshall by voice vote on May 5, 2010. He received his commission on May 6, 2010. He became Chief Judge on July 23, 2019 and served until December 18, 2023.

Legal offices
| Preceded by Billy Roy Wilson | Judge of the United States District Court for the Eastern District of Arkansas; 2010–present | Incumbent |
| Preceded by Brian S. Miller | Chief Judge of the United States District Court for the Eastern District of Arkansas; 2019–2023 | Succeeded by Kristine Baker |
