= McLean v. Arkansas =

1981 legal case in the US state of Arkansas

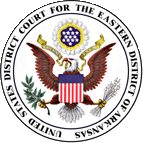
- Court: United States District Court for the Eastern District of Arkansas
- Full case name: McLean v. Arkansas Board of Education
- Decided: January 5, 1982
- Citation: 529 F. Supp. 1255

Holding
- The Arkansas Balanced Treatment Act of 1981 requiring schools balance the teaching of evolution with the teaching of creation science violated the Establishment Clause of the First Amendment to the United States Constitution

Court membership
- Judge sitting: William Overton

McLean v. Arkansas Board of Education, 529 F. Supp. 1255 (E.D. Ark. 1982), was a 1981 legal case in the US state of Arkansas.

A lawsuit was filed in the United States District Court for the Eastern District of Arkansas by various parents, religious groups and organizations, biologists, and others who argued that the Arkansas state law known as the Balanced Treatment for Creation-Science and Evolution-Science Act (Act 590), which mandated the teaching of "creation science" in Arkansas public schools, was unconstitutional because it violated the Establishment Clause of the First Amendment to the United States Constitution.

Judge William Overton handed down a decision on January 5, 1982, giving a clear, specific definition of science as a basis for ruling that creation science is religion and is simply not science. The ruling was not binding on schools outside the Eastern District of Arkansas but had considerable influence on subsequent rulings on the teaching of creationism.

Arkansas did not appeal the decision and it was not until the 1987 case of Edwards v. Aguillard, which dealt with a similar law passed by the State of Louisiana, that teaching "creation science" was ruled unconstitutional by the Supreme Court, making that determination applicable nationwide.

Act 590 had been put forward by a Christian fundamentalist on the basis of a request from the Greater Little Rock Evangelical Fellowship for the introduction of legislation based on a "model act" prepared using material from the Institute for Creation Research. It was opposed by many religious organizations and other groups.

== Parties ==
Judge William Overton oversaw the case as the sitting Judge for the U.S. District Court for the Eastern District of Arkansas. He received his undergraduate degree from the University of Arkansas in 1961 and completed his LL.B (Bachelor of Laws) from the University of Arkansas School of Law in 1964. He operated a private practice in Little Rock, Arkansas from 1964-1979 before he was nominated for his judgeship by Jimmy Carter on March 7, 1979, to a new seat authorized by 92 Stat. 1629. He was confirmed by the Senate on May 10, 1979.

The plaintiffs in the suit, who opposed the "balanced treatment" statute, included Reverend William McLean, a United Methodist minister. The other plaintiffs, represented by the ACLU, were:

- Bishop Kenneth Hicks, of the Arkansas Conferences of the United Methodist Church;
- The Right Reverend Herbert A. Donovan of the Episcopal Diocese of Arkansas;
- The Most Reverend Andrew Joseph McDonald, Catholic Bishop of Little Rock;
- Bishop Frederick C. James of the African Methodist Episcopal Church or Arkansas;
- The Reverend Nathan Porter, individually and as father and next friend of Joel Randolph Porter;
- The Reverend George W. Gunn, minister of the Pulaski Heights Presbyterian Church in Little Rock;
- Dr. Richard B. Hardie, Jr., minister of the Westover Hills Presbyterian Church in Little Rock;
- The Reverend Earl B. Carter, minister of the United Methodist Church, and program director of the North Arkansas Conference of the United Methodist Church;
- The Reverend George Panner, minister of the United Methodist Church, and program director of the Little Rock Conference of the United Methodist church;
- Dr. John P. Miles, minister of St. James United Methodist Church in Little Rock, and vice-chair of Americans United for Separation of Church and State in Arkansas;
- Rev. Jerry Canada, minister of the United Methodist Church, and editor of The Arkansas Methodist;
- The American Jewish Congress and American Jewish Committee, two national Jewish organizations;
- The Union of American Hebrew Congregations, the national federation of Reform Jews;
- Frances C. Roelfs, a biology teacher at Springdale High School in Springdale, Arkansas;
- Charles Bowlus, individually and as father and next friend of Cordelia Ann and Christopher Felix;
- Lon Schultz, individually and as father and next friend of Andrea Schultz;
- The Arkansas Education Association, a teachers' union;
- The National Association of Biology Teachers;
- E. E. Hudson, Associate Professor of Biological Sciences at Arkansas Technical University;
- Mike Wilson, of Jacksonville, Arkansas, an attorney and member of the Arkansas House of Representatives who voted against the act;
- National Coalition For Public Education and Religious Liberty (National PEARL).

The defendants, represented by Attorney General Steve Clark, were:

- The Arkansas Board of Education and its members, in their official capacity;
- The director of the Department of Education, in his official capacity;
- The State Textbooks and Instructional materials Selecting Committee;
- The Pulaski County Special School District and its directors and superintendent were named in the original complaint but were voluntarily dismissed by plaintiffs at the pre-trial conference on October 1, 1981.

When Bill Clinton was elected governor of Arkansas in 1975, Clark was elected attorney general, narrowly defeating state representative Art Givens in the Democratic primary. He argued eight cases before the U.S. Supreme Court.

== Background ==
Various state laws prohibiting teaching of evolution had been introduced in the 1920s.

In the early 1960's, there was a resurgence of concern among Fundamentalists about the loss of traditional values and a fear of growing secularism in society. The Fundamentalist movement became more active and steadily grew in numbers and political influence. There was emphasis among Fundamentalists on the literal interpretation of the Bible and the Book of Genesis as the sole source of knowledge about origins. The term "scientific creationism" first gained currency around 1965 following publication of The Genesis Flood in 1961 by Whitcomb and Morris. In the 1960's and early 1970's, several Fundamentalist organizations were formed to promote the idea that the Book of Genesis was supported by scientific data. The terms "creation science" and "scientific creationism" were adopted by these Fundamentalists as descriptive of their study of creation and the origins of man. The leading creationist organization was the Institute for Creation Research (ICR), which is affiliated with the Christian heritage College and supported by the Scott Memorial Baptist Church in San Diego, California. The common Fundamentalist Creationist opinion is that evolution is unchristian and unscientific.

"Evolution is thus not only anti-Biblical and anti-Christian, but it is utterly unscientific and impossible as well. But it has served effectively as the pseudo-scientific basis of atheism, agnosticism, socialism, fascism, and numerous other false and dangerous philosophies over the past century" [Morris and Clark, The Bible Has The Answer, (Px 31 and Pretrial Px 89)]

Various evolution curriculum laws were challenged in 1968 at Epperson v. Arkansas. The Arkansas legislature passed a law that prohibited the instructors at public or state-funded schools to teach or use textbooks for teaching human evolution. Epperson, who was a public school teacher, sued, arguing that it violated her First Amendment protection to free speech and as well the Establishment Clause. The State Chancery Court ruled that it violated her right to free speech; this decision was later reversed by the State Supreme Court. It was ruled that "The law's effort was confined to an attempt to blot out a particular theory because of its supposed conflict with the Biblical account, literally read. Plainly, the law is contrary to the mandate of the First, and in violation of the Fourteenth Amendment to the Constitution."

The creationist movement turned to promoting teaching creationism in school science classes as equal to evolutionary theory.

== Arkansas Act 590 ==
Arkansas Act 590 of 1981, entitled the "Balanced Treatment for Creation Science and Evolution Science Act," required a "balanced treatment" of creation-science and evolution-science in Arkansas public schools. James L. Holsted introduced the legislation, Senate Bill 482, without consulting with the Arkansas Department of Education, and the bill passed the Senate on March 13, 1981, without going through a committee for hearings and with only a few minutes of discussion on the Senate floor. The House of Representatives conducted only a 15-minute hearing before passing the bill 69-18.

Creation science was defined as follows: "Creation science means the scientific evidences for creation and inferences from those evidences." Creation science includes the scientific evidences and related inferences that indicate:

1. Sudden creation of the universe, energy and life from nothing;
2. The insufficiency of mutation and natural selection in bringing about development of all living kinds from a single organism;
3. Changes only with fixed limits of originally created kinds of plants and animals;
4. Separate ancestry for man and apes;
5. Explanation of the Earth's geology by catastrophism, including the occurrence of a worldwide flood;
6. A relatively recent inception of the Earth and living things.

Evolution science was defined as follows: "Evolution-science" means the scientific evidences for evolution and inferences from those scientific evidences. Evolution-science includes the scientific evidences and related inferences that indicate:

1. Emergence by naturalistic processes of the universe from disordered matter and emergence of life from nonlife;
2. The sufficiency of mutation and natural selection in bringing about development of present living kinds from simple earlier kinds;
3. Emergency [sic] by mutation and natural selection of present living kinds from simple earlier kinds;
4. Emergence of man from a common ancestor with apes;
5. Explanation of the Earth's geology and the evolutionary sequence by uniformitarianism; and
6. An inception several billion years ago of the Earth and somewhat later of life.

The act was signed into law by Governor Frank D. White on March 19, 1981.

== Trial ==
=== Prosecution and defense ===
A suit by The American Civil Liberties Union (ACLU), Bill McLean, et al. against The State of Arkansas, et al., prompted a two-week trial in Little Rock, Arkansas, 7 December 1981.

Consistent with the requirements of the Establishment Clause, the ACLU policy on religion in public schools states that "...any program of religious indoctrination -- direct or indirect -- in the public schools or by use of public resources is a violation of the constitutional principle of separation of church and state and must be opposed...." In 1980, the Board of Directors further clarified this policy by stating, "ACLU also opposes the inculcation of religious doctrines even if they are presented as alternatives to scientific theories."

The ACLU was supported by New York law firm, Skadden, Arps, Slate, Meagher & Flom who volunteered their attorneys, law students, paralegals, etc. The ACLU took a two-pronged approach, with a “religious team” of witnesses arguing that creationism was an explicitly religious doctrine, and a “scientific team” whose job was to undercut the supposed scientific claims of creationism.

Attorney General Steve Clark was seen as a reluctant defender of Act 590, and a number of state and national groups attempted to sign on as institutional defendants, citing a statement of Clark’s that he had “personal qualms” about the constitutionality of the act as a sign that he would not represent the case for creationism with full fervor. However, Judge Overton refused to allow any outside intervention. Then, it came to light in December 1981, in the very midst of the trial, that Clark had allowed the ACLU to auction off a dinner with him as part of a fundraising campaign.

=== Legal arguments ===
The prosecution centered their argument against the language in Section IV of Act 590.

Section 4 of Act 590 provides:

Definitions, as used in this Act:

(a) "Creation-science" means the scientific evidences for creation and inferences from those scientific evidences. Creation-science includes the scientific evidences and related inferences that indicate: (1) Sudden creation of the universe, energy, and life from nothing; (2) The insufficiency of mutation and natural selection in bringing about development of all living kinds from a single organism; (3) Changes only within fixed limits of originally created kinds of plants and animals; (4) Separate ancestry for man and apes; (5) Explanation of the earth's geology by catastrophism, including the occurrence of a worldwide flood; and (6) A relatively recent inception of the earth and living kinds.

(b) "Evolution-science" means the scientific evidences for evolution and inferences from those scientific evidences. Evolution-science includes the scientific evidences and related inferences that indicate: (1) Emergence by naturalistic processes of the universe from disordered matter and emergence of life from nonlife; (2) The sufficiency of mutation and natural selection in bringing about development of present living kinds from simple earlier kinds; (3) Emergence by mutation and natural selection of present living kinds from simple earlier kinds; (4) Emergence of man from a common ancestor with apes; (5) Explanation of the earth's geology and the evolutionary sequence by uniformitarianism; and (6) An inception several billion years ago of the earth and somewhat later of life.

(c) "Public schools" means public secondary and elementary schools.

The evidence established that the definition of "creation science" contained in 4(a) has an unmentioned reference the first 11 chapters of the Book of Genesis. Among the many creation stories in human history, the account of sudden creation from nothing, or creatio ex nihilo, and subsequent destruction of the world by flood is unique to Genesis. The concepts of 4(a) are the literal Fundamentalists' view of Genesis. Section 4(a) is unquestionably a statement of religion, with the exception of 4(a)(2) which is a negative thrust aimed at what the creationists understand to be the theory of evolution. Prosecution argued that both the concepts and wording of Section 4(a) convey an inescapable religiosity. Section 4(a)(1) describes "sudden creation of the universe, energy and life from nothing." Every theologian who testified, including defense witnesses, expressed the opinion that the statement referred to a supernatural creation which was performed by God. The defendants argue in their brief that evolution is, in effect, a religion, and that by teaching a religion which is contrary to some students' religious views, the State is infringing upon the student's free exercise rights under the First Amendment. The defendants argue that the teaching of evolution alone presents both a free exercise problem and an establishment problem which can only be redressed by giving balanced treatment to creation science,

"Evolution-science is contrary to the religious convictions or moral values or philosophical beliefs of many students and parents, including individuals of many different religious faiths and with diverse moral and philosophical beliefs." Act 590, &7(d).

The defendants' argument rested on a number of theories was acknowledge by the State's witnesses, Dr. Chandra Wickramasinghe and Dr. Norman Geisler. Dr. Wickramasinghe was generally critical of the theory of evolution and the scientific community and testified at length in support of a theory that life on earth was "seeded" by comets which delivered genetic material and perhaps organisms to the earth's surface from interstellar dust far outside the solar system. The "seeding" theory further hypothesizes that the earth remains under the continuing influence of genetic material from space which continues to affect life. The argument advanced by defendants' witness, Dr. Geisler, that teaching the existence of God is not religious unless the teaching seeks a commitment, is contrary to common understanding and contradicts settled case law. Stone v. Graham, 449 U.S. 39 (1980), Abbington School District v. Schempp, 374 U.S. 203, 222 (1963).

== Ruling ==
Judge William Overton's ruling, handed down on January 5, 1982, concluded that "creation-science" as defined in Arkansas Act 590 "is simply not science". The judgment defined the essential characteristics of science as being:

1. It is guided by natural law;
2. It has to be explanatory by reference to natural law;
3. It is testable against the empirical world;
4. Its conclusions are tentative, i.e. are not necessarily the final word;
5. It is falsifiable.

His test was adapted from and articulated in Lemon v. Kurtzman and Stone v. Graham, in which the court held that the Establishment Clause required that a statute satisfy all parts of a three-prong test:

1. The "Purpose Prong": The statute must have a secular legislative purpose.
2. The "Effect Prong": The principal or primary effect of the statute must neither advance nor inhibit religion.
3. The "Entanglement Prong": The statute must not result in an "excessive government entanglement" with religion.

Applying the Supreme Court’s test developed in Lemon v. Kurtzman, the Arkansas District Court determined that the law violated the Establishment Clause of the First Amendment because it had no valid legislative purpose and impermissibly advanced religion. The judge concluded that "the Act was passed with the specific purpose by the General Assembly of advancing religion," and that it violated the First Amendment's Establishment Clause.

Overton found that "creation science" failed to meet these essential characteristics for these reasons:

1. Sudden creation "from nothing" is not science because it depends upon a supernatural intervention which is not guided by natural law, is not explanatory by reference to natural law, is not testable and is not falsifiable;
2. "insufficiency of mutation and natural selection" is an incomplete negative generalization;
3. "changes only within fixed limits of originally created kinds" fails as there is no scientific definition of "kinds", the assertion appears to be an effort to establish outer limits of changes within species but there is no scientific explanation for these limits which is guided by natural law and the limitations, whatever they are, cannot be explained by natural law;
4. "separate ancestry of man and apes" is a bald assertion which explains nothing and refers to no scientific fact or theory;
5. Catastrophism and any kind of Genesis Flood depend upon supernatural intervention, and cannot be explained by natural law;
6. "Relatively recent inception" has no scientific meaning, is not the product of natural law; not explainable by natural law; nor is it tentative;
7. No recognized scientific journal has published an article espousing the creation science theory as described in the act, and though some witnesses suggested that the scientific community was "close-minded" and so had not accepted the arguments, no witness produced a scientific article for which publication has been refused, and suggestions of censorship were not credible;
8. A scientific theory must be tentative and always subject to revision or abandonment in light of facts that are inconsistent with, or falsify, the theory. A theory that is by its own terms dogmatic, absolutist, and never subject to revision is not a scientific theory;
9. While anybody is free to approach a scientific inquiry in any fashion they choose, they cannot properly describe the methodology as scientific, if they start with the conclusion and refuse to change it regardless of the evidence developed during the course of the investigation.

The creationists' methods do not take data, weigh it against the opposing scientific data, and thereafter reach the conclusions stated in [the act] Instead, they take the literal wording of the Book of Genesis and attempt to find scientific support for it. The act took a two-model approach to teaching identical to the approach put forward by the Institute for Creation Research, which assumes only two explanations for the origins of life and existence of man, plants and animals: it was either the work of a creator or it was not. Creationists take this to mean that all scientific evidence which fails to support the theory of evolution is necessarily scientific evidence in support of creationism. The judgment found this to be simply a contrived dualism which has no scientific factual basis or legitimate educational purpose.

The test that Overton developed on the basis of Michael Ruse's testimony was later criticized by the philosopher of science Larry Laudan who argued that rather than call Creation Science "non-science" it would have been more cogent to show that it was "bad science". Chandra Wickramasinghe was the single scientist testifying for the defense of creationism. He hypothesized on panspermia and on "the possibility of high intelligence in the Universe and of many increasing levels of intelligence converging toward a God as an ideal limit."
