= Kristine Baker =

American judge (born 1971)

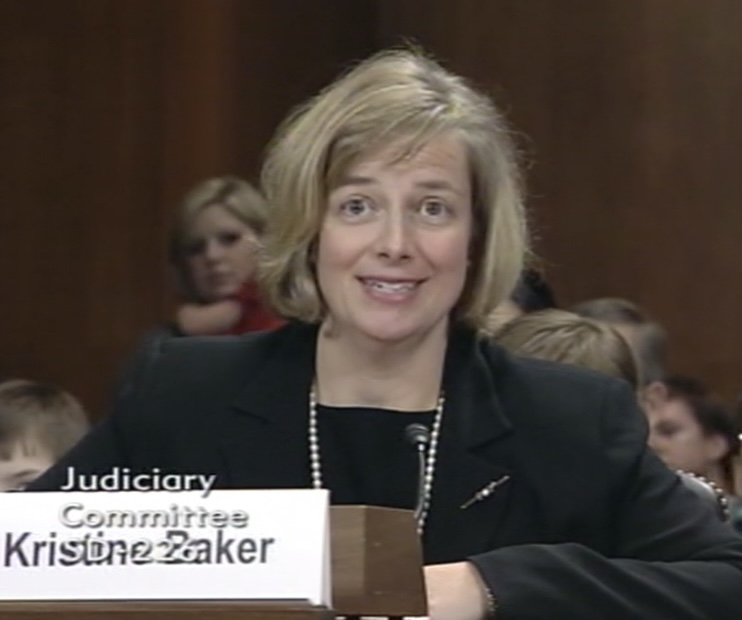
- Baker in 2012

Chief Judge of the United States District Court for the Eastern District of Arkansas
- Incumbent
- Assumed office December 18, 2023
- Preceded by: D. Price Marshall Jr.

Judge of the United States District Court for the Eastern District of Arkansas
- Incumbent
- Assumed office May 8, 2012
- Appointed by: Barack Obama
- Preceded by: James Maxwell Moody

Personal details
- Born: Kristine Anne Gerhard; 1971 (age 54–55) Colorado Springs, Colorado, U.S.
- Education: Saint Louis University (BA); University of Arkansas (JD)

Kristine Anne Gerhard Baker (born 1971) is an American lawyer. She is the chief United States district judge of the United States District Court for the Eastern District of Arkansas.

== Early life and education ==
Baker was born Kristine Anne Gerhard in 1971, in Colorado Springs, Colorado. She received a Bachelor of Arts degree, summa cum laude, in 1993 from Saint Louis University. She received her Juris Doctor, magna cum laude, in 1996 from the University of Arkansas School of Law.

== Career ==
She served as a law clerk for then Chief Judge Susan Webber Wright of the United States District Court for the Eastern District of Arkansas from 1996 to 1998. She then worked at the law firm of William & Anderson from 1998 to 2000. She joined the law firm of Quattlebaum, Grooms, Tull & Burrow, located in Little Rock, Arkansas in 2000, and became a partner in 2002. In practice, her legal specialties were commercial litigation, employment law, and First Amendment litigation.

=== Federal judicial service ===
On November 2, 2011, President Barack Obama nominated Baker to be a District Judge for the United States District Court for the Eastern District of Arkansas. She replaced District Judge James Maxwell Moody who took senior status on October 1, 2008. She received her hearing by the Senate Judiciary Committee on January 26, 2012, and her nomination was reported to the floor on February 16, 2012, by voice vote, with Senator Mike Lee recording the only no vote. On May 7, 2012, her nomination was confirmed by voice vote. She received her commission on May 8, 2012. She became chief judge on December 18, 2023.

=== Notable case ===
On April 15, 2017, Baker blocked executions by the State of Arkansas, citing concerns over the use of midazolam, a drug used for sedation. Arkansas had planned to execute eight prisoners in the two weeks before the expiration date on one of the state's lethal injection drugs.

Legal offices
Preceded by James Maxwell Moody	Judge of the United States District Court for the Eastern District of Arkansas; 2012–present	Incumbent
Preceded by D. Price Marshall Jr.	Chief Judge of the United States District Court for the Eastern District of Arkansas; 2023–present	Incumbent
