= Elsijane Trimble Roy =

American judge (1916–2007)

Senior Judge of the United States District Court for the Eastern District of Arkansas
- In office January 1, 1989 – January 23, 2007

Senior Judge of the United States District Court for the Western District of Arkansas
- In office January 1, 1989 – December 1, 1990

Judge of the United States District Court for the Eastern District of Arkansas Judge of the United States District Court for the Western District of Arkansas
- In office November 2, 1977 – January 1, 1989
- Appointed by: Jimmy Carter
- Preceded by: Oren Harris
- Succeeded by: Susan Webber Wright

Personal details
- Born: April 2, 1916 Lonoke, Arkansas, U.S.
- Died: January 23, 2007 (aged 90) Little Rock, Arkansas, U.S.
- Education: University of Arkansas School of Law (JD)
- Occupation: Lawyer, judge

Elsijane Trimble Roy (April 2, 1916 – January 23, 2007) was an associate justice of the Arkansas Supreme Court and a United States district judge of the United States District Court for the Eastern District of Arkansas and the United States District Court for the Western District of Arkansas.

== Education and career ==
Born in Lonoke, Arkansas, Roy received a Juris Doctor from the University of Arkansas School of Law in 1939. She was in private practice in Lonoke in 1939, and in Little Rock in 1940. She was an attorney for the Arkansas State Department of Revenue in Little Rock from 1941 to 1942.

She was in private practice in Blytheville, Arkansas from 1945 to 1963. She was a law clerk for Justice Frank Holt of the Supreme Court of Arkansas from 1963 to 1965.

She was a Circuit Judge of the Sixth Judicial District of Arkansas in 1966. She was an assistant state attorney general of the State of Arkansas in 1967, and was then a law clerk for Judge Gordon E. Young of the United States District Court of the Eastern District of Arkansas from 1967 to 1969, and a senior law clerk for Judge Paul X. Williams of the United States District Court of the Western District of Arkansas from 1970 to 1975. She was an associate justice of the Arkansas Supreme Court from 1975 to 1977.

== Federal judicial service ==
On October 21, 1977, Roy was nominated by President Jimmy Carter to a joint seat on the United States District Court for the Eastern District of Arkansas and the United States District Court for the Western District of Arkansas vacated by Judge Oren Harris.

She was confirmed by the United States Senate on November 1, 1977, and received her commission on November 2, 1977. She assumed senior status on January 1, 1989. On December 1, 1990, Roy was reassigned to sit on only the Eastern District of Arkansas, and served in that capacity until her death, in Little Rock on January 23, 2007.

== Family ==
She was the daughter of Thomas Clark Trimble III and Elsie Jane Walls. She married lawyer James Morrison Roy on November 23, 1944, they divorced in 1967, they had one son. She and her husband had a law firm of Roy and Roy, dissolved in 1963.

== See also ==
- List of first women lawyers and judges in California

Legal offices
Preceded by Oren Harris	Judge of the United States District Court for the Eastern District of Arkansas; Judge of the United States District Court for the Western District of Arkansas; 1977–1989	Succeeded by Susan Webber Wright
