= Thomas Clark Trimble III =

American judge (1878–1965)

Senior Judge of the United States District Court for the Eastern District of Arkansas
- In office January 14, 1957 – July 6, 1965

Chief Judge of the United States District Court for the Eastern District of Arkansas
- In office 1948–1957
- Preceded by: Office established
- Succeeded by: J. Smith Henley

Judge of the United States District Court for the Eastern District of Arkansas
- In office June 18, 1937 – January 14, 1957
- Appointed by: Franklin D. Roosevelt
- Preceded by: John Ellis Martineau
- Succeeded by: J. Smith Henley

Personal details
- Born: Thomas Clark Trimble III; August 27, 1878 Lonoke, Arkansas, U.S.
- Died: July 6, 1965 (aged 86) Little Rock, Arkansas, U.S.
- Education: University of Arkansas School of Law (LL.B.)

Thomas Clark Trimble III (August 27, 1878 – July 6, 1965) was a United States district judge of the United States District Court for the Eastern District of Arkansas.

== Education and career ==
Born in Lonoke, Arkansas, Trimble received a Bachelor of Laws in 1902 from the University of Arkansas School of Law at Fayetteville. He was in private practice in Lonoke from 1902 to 1937.

== Federal judicial service ==
On June 17, 1937, Trimble was nominated by President Franklin D. Roosevelt to a seat on the United States District Court for the Eastern District of Arkansas vacated by Judge John Ellis Martineau. Trimble was confirmed by the United States Senate, and received his commission on June 18, 1937. He served as Chief Judge from 1948 to 1957 and assumed senior status on January 14, 1957. Trimble served in that capacity until his death on July 6, 1965, in Little Rock, Arkansas.

== Family ==
Trimble married Elsie Jane Walls. The couple had a daughter, Elsijane Trimble Roy, who was appointed in 1977 by President Jimmy Carter to a joint seat on the United States District Court for the Eastern District of Arkansas and the United States District Court for the Western District of Arkansas.

== Sources ==
Legal offices
Preceded by John Ellis Martineau	Judge of the United States District Court for the Eastern District of Arkansas; 1937–1957	Succeeded by Jesse Smith Henley
Preceded by Office established	Chief Judge of the United States District Court for the Eastern District of Arkansas; 1948–1957	Succeeded by Jesse Smith Henley
