= Stephen M. Reasoner =

American judge

Senior Judge of the United States District Court for the Eastern District of Arkansas
- In office September 19, 2002 – August 14, 2004

Chief Judge of the United States District Court for the Eastern District of Arkansas
- In office 1991–1998
- Preceded by: Garnett Thomas Eisele
- Succeeded by: Susan Webber Wright

Judge of the United States District Court for the Eastern District of Arkansas
- In office February 26, 1988 – September 19, 2002
- Appointed by: Ronald Reagan
- Preceded by: William Overton
- Succeeded by: James Leon Holmes

Personal details
- Born: May 7, 1944 Houston, Texas, U.S.
- Died: August 14, 2004 (aged 60) Little Rock, Arkansas, U.S.
- Education: University of Arkansas (B.A.); University of Arkansas School of Law (J.D.)

Stephen Mathew Reasoner (May 7, 1944 – August 14, 2004) was a United States district judge of the United States District Court for the Eastern District of Arkansas.

== Education and career ==
Born in Houston, Texas, Reasoner received a Bachelor of Arts degree from University of Arkansas in 1966. He received a Juris Doctor from University of Arkansas School of Law in 1969.

He was in the United States Army Reserve from 1969 to 1973 where he was in the 218th Military Intelligence Detachment and became a specialist 4th class. He was in private practice of law in Jonesboro, Arkansas from 1969 to 1988.

== Federal judicial service ==
Reasoner was nominated by President Ronald Reagan on December 19, 1987, to a seat on the United States District Court for the Eastern District of Arkansas vacated by Judge William Overton. He was confirmed by the United States Senate on February 25, 1988, and received commission on February 26, 1988. He served as Chief Judge from 1991 to 1998. He assumed senior status on September 17, 2002 due to a certified disability.

His service was terminated on August 14, 2004, due to his death in Little Rock, Arkansas.

== Sources ==
Legal offices
Preceded by William Overton	Judge of the United States District Court for the Eastern District of Arkansas; 1988–2002	Succeeded by James Leon Holmes
Preceded by Garnett Thomas Eisele	Chief Judge of the United States District Court for the Eastern District of Arkansas; 1991–1998	Succeeded by Susan Webber Wright
