= Lee Rudofsky =

American judge (born 1979)

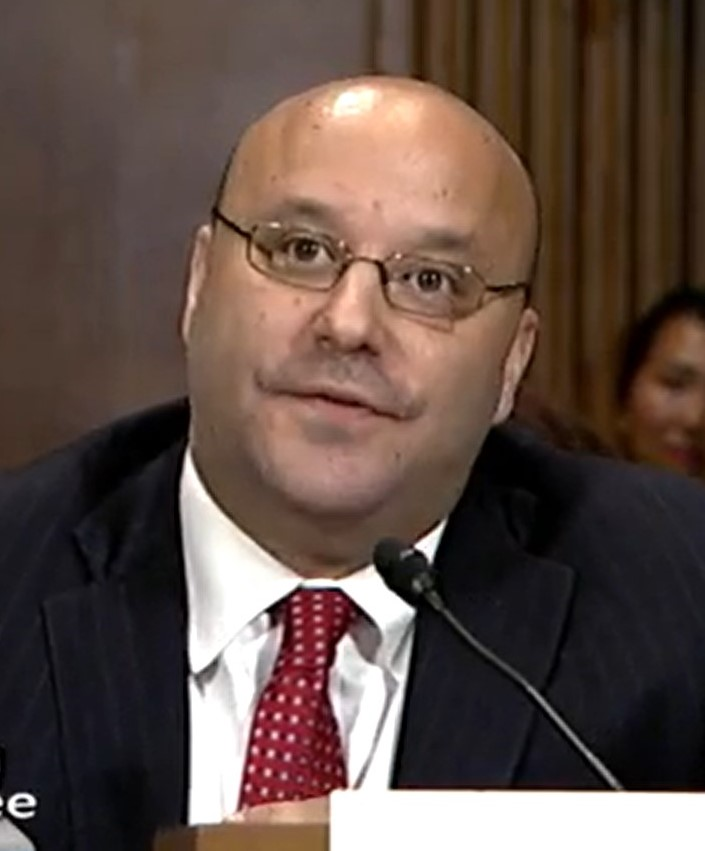
- Rudofsky in 2019

Judge of the United States District Court for the Eastern District of Arkansas
- Incumbent
- Assumed office November 8, 2019
- Appointed by: Donald Trump
- Preceded by: James Leon Holmes

Solicitor General of Arkansas
- In office July 1, 2015 – July 20, 2018
- Governor: Asa Hutchinson
- Preceded by: Position established
- Succeeded by: Nicholas Bronni

Personal details
- Born: 1979 (age 46–47) New York City, New York, U.S.
- Education: Cornell University (BS, MPA); Harvard University (JD)

Lee Philip Rudofsky (born 1979) is a United States district judge of the United States District Court for the Eastern District of Arkansas, serving since 2019. In September 2026, Rudofsky was nominated by President Donald Trump to a seat on the United States Court of Appeals for the Eighth Circuit, but Trump withdrew his nomination in November 2026.

== Early life ==
Rudofsky was born in New York City in 1979 to Edward S. and Susan Rudofsky. He was raised in the city, where his father practiced as a commercial litigation attorney.

He spent his early childhood years in Brooklyn, where his family resided in the Gerritsen Beach neighborhood. He attended public primary schools and graduated from Stuyvesant High School in Manhattan.

== Education and early career ==
Rudofsky received a Bachelor of Science in 2001 and a Master of Public Administration in 2002 from Cornell University. He then earned a Juris Doctor from Harvard Law School in 2005.

After law school, Rudofsky served as a law clerk to Justice Robert J. Cordy of the Massachusetts Supreme Judicial Court. He then clerked for Judge Andrew Kleinfeld of the United States Court of Appeals for the Ninth Circuit.

He subsequently became an associate at the law firm Kirkland & Ellis. He next served as deputy general counsel to the Mitt Romney 2012 presidential campaign.

In 2015, Rudofsky became Solicitor General of Arkansas. He left that post in 2018 to become senior director for global anti-corruption compliance at Walmart. He has been a member of the Federalist Society since 2002.

== Federal judicial service ==
=== U.S. District Court for the Eastern District of Arkansas ===
On July 1, 2019, President Donald Trump announced his intent to nominate Rudofsky to serve as a United States District Judge of the United States District Court for the Eastern District of Arkansas. Rudofsky was nominated to the seat vacated by Judge James Leon Holmes, who assumed senior status on March 31, 2018. On July 8, 2019, his nomination was sent to the United States Senate. Senator Tom Cotton recommended his nomination. On July 31, 2019, a hearing on his nomination was held before the Senate Judiciary Committee. On October 17, 2019, his nomination was reported out of committee by a 12–10 vote. On November 6, 2019, the Senate invoked cloture on his nomination by a 51–41 vote. On November 7, 2019, his nomination was confirmed by a 51–41 vote. He received his judicial commission on November 8, 2019.

In 2022, Rudofsky held that private American citizens could not bring suit under Section 2 of the Voting Rights Act, instead concluding that provision could only be enforced by lawsuits filed directly by the Attorney General of the United States.

=== Nomination to U.S. Court of Appeals for the Eighth Circuit ===
In September 2026, Rudofsky was nominated by President Donald Trump to a seat on the United States Court of Appeals for the Eighth Circuit. His nomination was withdrawn by Trump on November 10, 2026.

== Personal life ==
Rudofsky is Jewish.

== See also ==
- List of Jewish American jurists

Legal offices
New office	Solicitor General of Arkansas; 2015–2018	Succeeded by Nicholas Bronni
Preceded by James Leon Holmes	Judge of the United States District Court for the Eastern District of Arkansas; 2019–present	Incumbent
