= Garnett Thomas Eisele =

American judge (1923–2017)

G. Thomas Eisele

Senior Judge of the United States District Court for the Eastern District of Arkansas
- In office August 1, 1991 – November 26, 2017

Chief Judge of the United States District Court for the Eastern District of Arkansas
- In office 1975–1991
- Preceded by: Jesse Smith Henley
- Succeeded by: Stephen M. Reasoner

Judge of the United States District Court for the Eastern District of Arkansas
- In office August 6, 1970 – August 1, 1991
- Appointed by: Richard Nixon
- Preceded by: Gordon Elmo Young
- Succeeded by: Billy Roy Wilson

Personal details
- Born: Garnett Thomas Eisele; November 3, 1923 Hot Springs, Arkansas, U.S.
- Died: November 26, 2017 (aged 94) Little Rock, Arkansas, U.S.
- Education: Washington University in St. Louis (A.B.); Harvard Law School (LL.B., LL.M.)

Garnett Thomas Eisele, (November 3, 1923 – November 26, 2017), better known as G. Thomas Eisele, was a United States district judge of the United States District Court for the Eastern District of Arkansas.

== Education and career ==
Born on November 3, 1923, in Hot Springs, Arkansas, Eisele had attended several Republican National Conventions with his grandfather, Martin Eisele.

He was a private in the United States Army during World War II from 1942 to 1946. In 1947, he procured a Bachelor of Arts degree from Washington University in St. Louis, Missouri. He then obtained both a Bachelor of Laws and a Master of Laws in 1950 and 1951 from Harvard Law School in Cambridge, Massachusetts.

From 1952 to 1961, Eisele was in the United States Naval Reserve. He was in private practice in Hot Springs from 1951 to 1953. He was an Assistant United States Attorney in the capital city of Little Rock from 1953 to 1955. After he was not nominated for United States Attorney, Eisele returned to private practice in Little Rock from 1956 to 1970.

In the early 1960s, Eisele supported Winthrop Rockefeller's attempt to revive the Arkansas Republican Party. At the time Rockefeller was engaged in an intra-party rivalry with state chairman William L. Spicer of Fort Smith, the owner of a chain of drive-in theaters. From 1966 to 1969, Eisele was the legal advisor to Rockefeller, who was elected governor in 1966–68.

== Federal judicial service ==
Eisele was nominated by President Richard Nixon on January 23, 1970, to a seat on the United States District Court for the Eastern District of Arkansas vacated by Judge Gordon Elmo Young. He was confirmed by the United States Senate on August 5, 1970, and received his commission on August 6, 1970. He served as Chief Judge from 1975 to 1991. He assumed senior status on August 1, 1991. His service terminated on November 26, 2017, due to his death in Little Rock.

== See also ==
- List of United States federal judges by longevity of service

Legal offices
Preceded by Gordon Elmo Young	Judge of the United States District Court for the Eastern District of Arkansas; 1970–1991	Succeeded by Billy Roy Wilson
Preceded by Jesse Smith Henley	Chief Judge of the United States District Court for the Eastern District of Arkansas; 1975–1991	Succeeded by Stephen M. Reasoner
