= Billy Roy Wilson =

American judge (1939–2025)

Senior Judge of the United States District Court for the Eastern District of Arkansas
- In office October 1, 2008 – October 27, 2025

Judge of the United States District Court for the Eastern District of Arkansas
- In office October 1, 1993 – October 1, 2008
- Appointed by: Bill Clinton
- Preceded by: Garnett Thomas Eisele
- Succeeded by: D. Price Marshall Jr.

Personal details
- Born: William Roy Wilson Jr. December 18, 1939 Little Rock, Arkansas, U.S.
- Died: October 27, 2025 (aged 85) Rochester, Minnesota, U.S.
- Education: Hendrix College (BA); Vanderbilt University (JD)

William Roy Wilson Jr. (December 18, 1939 – October 27, 2025) was a United States district judge of the United States District Court for the Eastern District of Arkansas.

== Education and career ==
Born in Little Rock, Arkansas, Wilson received a Bachelor of Arts degree from Hendrix College in 1962 and a Juris Doctor from Vanderbilt University Law School in 1965. He was in private practice in Texarkana, Arkansas from 1965 to 1966. He was a deputy prosecuting attorney of Miller County, Arkansas from 1965 to 1966. He was in the United States Navy as a lieutenant (junior grade) from 1966 to 1969. He was in private practice in Little Rock, Arkansas from 1969 to 1993. He briefly served as acting Arkansas Attorney General in the mid-1970s.

== Federal judicial service ==
Wilson was a United States District Judge of the United States District Court for the Eastern District of Arkansas. He was nominated by President Bill Clinton on August 6, 1993, to a seat vacated by G. Thomas Eisele. Wilson was confirmed by the United States Senate on September 30, 1993, and received his commission on October 1, 1993. He assumed senior status on October 1, 2008.

== Name change ==
On January 12, 2011, Wilson's name was legally changed from William Roy Wilson Jr. to Billy Roy Wilson, which was his intended name at birth. Two days later, the United States District Court directed that all cases before Wilson hereafter reflect his new name.

== Death ==
Wilson died in Rochester, Minnesota, on October 27, 2025, at the age of 85.

== Sources ==
Legal offices
Preceded by G. Thomas Eisele	Judge of the United States District Court for the Eastern District of Arkansas; 1993–2008	Succeeded by D. Price Marshall Jr.
