= Terry Shell =

American judge

Judge of the United States District Court for the Eastern District of Arkansas Judge of the United States District Court for the Western District of Arkansas
- In office September 16, 1975 – June 25, 1978
- Appointed by: Gerald Ford
- Preceded by: J. Smith Henley
- Succeeded by: Richard S. Arnold

Member of the Arkansas House of Representatives from the Craighead County district
- In office January 12, 1953 – January 10, 1955
- Preceded by: Ivie C. Spencer
- Succeeded by: Charlie G. Johnston

Personal details
- Born: Terry Lee Shell; April 2, 1922 Franklin, Arkansas, U.S.
- Died: June 25, 1978 (aged 56) Little Rock, Arkansas, U.S.
- Party: Democrat
- Spouse: Sara McCutcheon (m. 1945–1978)
- Children: Suzanne Shell; Jeanne Carol Shell
- Education: Arkansas State University (B.S.E.); University of Arkansas School of Law (LL.B., J.D.)

Military service
- Allegiance: United States
- Branch/service: United States Army
- Years of service: 1943–November 1945
- Unit: 99th Infantry
- Battles/wars: World War II; Battle of the Bulge

Terry Lee Shell (April 2, 1922 – June 25, 1978) was a United States district judge of the United States District Court for the Eastern District of Arkansas and the United States District Court for the Western District of Arkansas.

== Education and career ==
Shell was born in Franklin, Arkansas to Elmer G. and Roxie E. (née Fudge) Shell. Shell had a brother, John Russell, and a sister. The family moved to Jonesboro when Shell was young. He attended public schools and graduated from Jonesboro High School in Jonesboro in 1939. Shell served in the United States Army during World War II, from 1943 to November 1945. He was captured and held as a Prisoner of War by the Germans at the Battle of the Bulge.

He received a Bachelor of Science in Engineering from Arkansas State University in 1946, and thereafter briefly attended the University of Texas Law School. Smith earned a Bachelor of Laws and Juris Doctor from the University of Arkansas School of Law in 1949. He was in private practice in Arkansas from 1949 to 1960. He was a member of the Arkansas House of Representatives from 1953 to 1954, serving in the 59th Arkansas General Assembly. He was prosecuting attorney of the 2nd Judicial Circuit of Arkansas from 1955 to 1960. He was a chancery judge of the 12th Chancery Circuit Court of Arkansas from 1961 to 1975.

== Federal judicial service ==
Shell was nominated by President Gerald Ford on July 25, 1975, to a joint seat on the United States District Court for the Eastern District of Arkansas and the United States District Court for the Western District of Arkansas vacated by J. Smith Henley. He was confirmed by the United States Senate on September 15, 1975, and received his commission on September 16, 1975, serving until his death.

== Death ==
Shell died on June 25, 1978, after suffering a heart attack at his residence in Little Rock, Arkansas, leading to cardiac arrest after he arrived at the hospital.

== Sources ==
Legal offices
Preceded by J. Smith Henley	Judge of the United States District Court for the Eastern District of Arkansas; Judge of the United States District Court for the Western District of Arkansas; 1975–1978	Succeeded by Richard S. Arnold
