= James Leon Holmes =

American judge (born 1951)

Senior Judge of the United States District Court for the Eastern District of Arkansas
- In office March 31, 2018 – February 5, 2020

Chief Judge of the United States District Court for the Eastern District of Arkansas
- In office 2005–2012
- Preceded by: Susan Webber Wright
- Succeeded by: Brian S. Miller

Judge of the United States District Court for the Eastern District of Arkansas
- In office July 7, 2004 – March 31, 2018
- Appointed by: George W. Bush
- Preceded by: Stephen M. Reasoner
- Succeeded by: Lee Rudofsky

Personal details
- Born: James Leon Holmes; March 31, 1951 (age 75) Hazen, Arkansas, U.S.
- Spouse: Susan A. Byrd
- Education: Arkansas State University (BA); Northern Illinois University (MA); Duke University (PhD); University of Arkansas School of Law (JD)

James Leon Holmes (born March 31, 1951) is a former United States district judge of the United States District Court for the Eastern District of Arkansas.

== Education and career ==
=== Education ===
Born in Hazen, Arkansas, Holmes received a Bachelor of Arts degree from Arkansas State University in 1973, a Master of Arts degree from Northern Illinois University in 1976, a Doctor of Philosophy from Duke University in 1979, and a Juris Doctor from the University of Arkansas School of Law in 1982.

=== Pre-legal career ===
His first job was working as a door-to-door salesman for the Southwestern Company in Nashville, Tennessee in the summers of 1971, 1972, and 1973.

From 1974 to 1980, he worked at many businesses, organizations, and colleges which included Northern Illinois University, Duke University, and Augustana College.

=== Legal career ===
From 1980 to 1981, he served as a law clerk for Katz, McAndrew, Durkee, and Tellen in Rock Island, Illinois. He was a law clerk for Judge Frank Holt of the Supreme Court of Arkansas from 1982 to 1983. He was in private practice in Little Rock, Arkansas, from 1983 to 1990, and again from 1992 to 2004. He was an adjunct faculty member in the Political Science Department at the University of Arkansas in 1983. He was a Tutor/professor at Thomas Aquinas College from 1990 to 1992. He was an adjunct faculty member at the University of Arkansas School of Law in 2002.

== Federal judicial service ==
Holmes is a United States District Judge of the United States District Court for the Eastern District of Arkansas. Holmes was nominated by President George W. Bush on January 29, 2003, to a seat vacated by Stephen M. Reasoner. The Senate Judiciary Committee gave no recommendation for Holmes. He was confirmed by the United States Senate on July 6, 2004 by a 51–46 vote, and received his commission on July 7, 2004. He served as chief judge from 2005 to 2012. He assumed senior status on March 31, 2018. He retired from active service on February 5, 2020.

== Abortion remarks ==
Holmes was at one time a leader in the anti-abortion movement in Arkansas. In 1980, he minimized concerns about the effect on rape victims of a proposed constitutional amendment banning abortion. "Concern for rape victims is a red herring because conceptions from rape occur with approximately the same frequency as snowfall in Miami," he wrote. In 1982, he compared the abortion rights movement to the Nazis. "The pro-abortionists counsel us to respond to these problems by abandoning what little morality our society still recognizes," he wrote. "This was attempted by one highly sophisticated, historically Christian nation in our century — Nazi Germany." In 2003, Holmes apologized for the "strident and harsh" rhetoric of these 1980 and 1982 remarks.

Legal offices
Preceded by Stephen M. Reasoner	Judge of the United States District Court for the Eastern District of Arkansas; 2004–2018	Succeeded by Lee Rudofsky
Preceded by Susan Webber Wright	Chief Judge of the United States District Court for the Eastern District of Arkansas; 2005–2012	Succeeded by Brian S. Miller
