= James M. Moody Jr. =

American judge (born 1964)

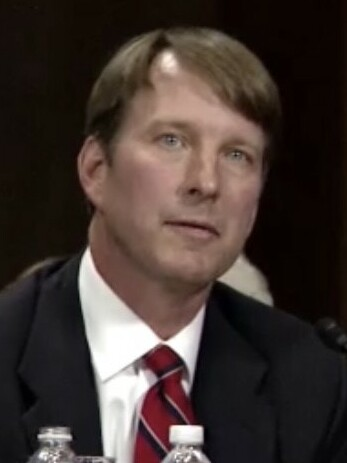
- Moody in 2013

Judge of the United States District Court for the Eastern District of Arkansas
- Incumbent
- Assumed office March 10, 2014
- Appointed by: Barack Obama
- Preceded by: Susan Webber Wright

Personal details
- Born: James Maxwell Moody Jr. 1964 (age 61–62) El Dorado, Arkansas, U.S.
- Parent: James Maxwell Moody (father)
- Education: University of Arkansas (BSBA, JD)

James "Jay" Maxwell Moody Jr. (born 1964) is a United States district judge of the United States District Court for the Eastern District of Arkansas and former circuit judge for the Third Division of the Sixth Judicial District of Arkansas.

== Early life and career ==
Moody was born in 1964 in El Dorado, Arkansas. Moody is the son of former Judge James Maxwell Moody, who retired from active service on the United States District Court for the Eastern District of Arkansas when his son was elevated to the federal bench. He received his Bachelor of Science in Business Administration degree in 1986 from the University of Arkansas. He received his Juris Doctor in 1989 from the University of Arkansas Bowen School of Law. He became an associate in 1989 at the law firm of Wright, Lindsey & Jennings LLP, and became a partner at that firm in 1994. His focus at the firm was on civil litigation in state and federal courts.

== Judicial career ==
In 2003, he became a circuit judge for the Third Division of the Sixth Judicial District of Arkansas, a position he held until he received his commission for his federal judicial judgeship.

=== Federal judicial service ===
On July 25, 2013, President Barack Obama nominated Moody to serve as a United States district judge of the United States District Court for the Eastern District of Arkansas, to the seat being vacated by Judge Susan Webber Wright, who assumed senior status on August 22, 2013. Moody's father said he would retire from the federal district court in the Eastern District of Arkansas if his son wins Senate confirmation; he later retired from active service on March 7, 2014. On November 14, 2013, the Senate Judiciary Committee reported Moody's nomination to the full Senate. After the first session of the 113th Congress ended, Moody's nomination was returned to President Obama, who renominated Moody in January 2014. The Senate Judiciary Committee reported Moody's nomination to the full Senate on January 16, 2014. On February 12, 2014, Senate Majority Leader Harry Reid filed for cloture on Moody's nomination. On Tuesday February 25, 2014, the Senate invoked cloture on Moody's nomination by a 58–34 vote, with Orrin Hatch (R–Utah) voting "present". On February 25, 2014, his nomination was confirmed by a 95–4 vote. He received his judicial commission on March 10, 2014.

== Sources ==
- James Maxwell Moody, Jr. at Ballotpedia

Legal offices
Preceded by Susan Webber Wright	Judge of the United States District Court for the Eastern District of Arkansas; 2014–present	Incumbent
