= Henry Woods (judge) =

American judge (1918–2002)

Senior Judge of the United States District Court for the Eastern District of Arkansas
- In office March 1, 1995 – March 14, 2002

Judge of the United States District Court for the Eastern District of Arkansas
- In office February 20, 1980 – March 1, 1995
- Appointed by: Jimmy Carter
- Preceded by: Seat established by 92 Stat. 1629
- Succeeded by: James Maxwell Moody

Personal details
- Born: Henry Woods; March 17, 1918 Abbeville, Mississippi
- Died: March 14, 2002 (aged 83) Little Rock, Arkansas
- Education: University of Arkansas (BA); University of Arkansas School of Law (JD)

Henry Woods (March 17, 1918 – March 14, 2002) was a United States district judge of the United States District Court for the Eastern District of Arkansas.

== Education and career ==
Born in Abbeville, Mississippi, Woods received a Bachelor of Arts degree from the University of Arkansas in 1938 and a Juris Doctor from the University of Arkansas School of Law in 1940. He was an FBI special agent from 1941 to 1946. He was in private practice in Texarkana, Arkansas from 1946 to 1948, serving as a Referee in Bankruptcy for the United States District Court for the Western District of Arkansas from 1946 to 1947. He was executive secretary to Governor Sid McMath from 1949 to 1953, as well as serving as his campaign manager in both his successful bids in 1948 and 1950, his defeat for re-election as governor in 1952 as well as his failed challenge to Governor Orval Faubus in 1962, and his bid to topple United States Senator John Little McClellan in 1954. He returned to private practice with McMath in the firm of McMath, Leatherman, and Woods in Little Rock, Arkansas until 1980. He was a Special Associate Justice of the Arkansas Supreme Court from 1967 to 1974.

== Federal judicial service ==
On December 14, 1979, Woods was nominated by President Jimmy Carter to a new seat on the United States District Court for the Eastern District of Arkansas created by 92 Stat. 1629. He was confirmed by the United States Senate on February 20, 1980, and received his commission the same day. His tenure was most notable for presiding over the contentious Pulaski County School Desegregation case from 1982 to 1990 and the controversies surrounding the tenure of then-Pulaski County Sheriff Tommy Robinson. He assumed senior status on March 1, 1995, serving in that capacity until his death on March 14, 2002, in Little Rock.

== Sources ==
Legal offices
Preceded by Seat established by 92 Stat. 1629	Judge of the United States District Court for the Eastern District of Arkansas; 1980–1995	Succeeded by James Maxwell Moody
