= William Overton (judge) =

American judge (1939–1987)

William Ray Overton
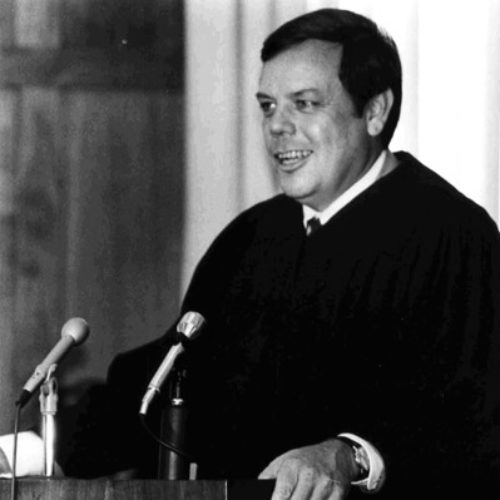
- A photograph of Judge Overton residing over his courtroom.

Judge of the United States District Court for the Eastern District of Arkansas
- In office May 11, 1979 – July 14, 1987
- Appointed by: Jimmy Carter
- Preceded by: Seat established by 92 Stat. 1629
- Succeeded by: Stephen M. Reasoner

Personal details
- Born: William Ray Overton; September 19, 1939 Malvern, Arkansas, U.S.
- Died: July 14, 1987 (aged 47)
- Education: University of Arkansas (BA, BS); University of Arkansas School of Law (LLB)

William Ray Overton (September 19, 1939 – July 14, 1987) was a United States district judge of the United States District Court for the Eastern District of Arkansas.

== Education and career ==
Born in Malvern, Arkansas, Overton received a Bachelor of Arts degree and a Bachelor of Science degree concurrently from the University of Arkansas in 1961, and a Bachelor of Laws from the University of Arkansas School of Law in 1964. He was in private practice of law in Little Rock, Arkansas from 1964 to 1979.

== Federal judicial service ==
Overton was nominated to the United States District Court for the Eastern District of Arkansas by President Jimmy Carter on March 7, 1979, to a new seat created by 92 Stat. 1629. He was confirmed by the United States Senate on May 10, 1979, and received his commission on May 11, 1979. Overton continued to serve on that court until his death of cancer on July 14, 1987, at his home.

== Notable case ==
Overton is known for his ruling on Act 590 "The Arkansas' Balanced Treatment Act" in McLean v. Arkansas, which was a law seeking to require the teaching of Creation Science in classrooms. This statute was advocated by its supporters as providing equal treatment of creation science as the Theory of Evolution in the science classrooms.

When Overton struck down the Act in 1982, he used the criteria that a scientific theory must be tentative and always subject to revision or abandonment in light of the facts that are inconsistent with, or falsify, the theory. A theory that is by its own terms dogmatic, absolutist and never subject to revision is not a scientific theory.

In summary, he held that a scientific theory to be taught in schools must have the following properties:

1. It is guided by natural law;
2. It has to be explained by reference to natural law;
3. It is testable against the empirical world;
4. Its conclusions are tentative, i.e., are not necessarily the final word;
5. It is falsifiable.

== External citations ==
- Overton, W. R. (1982). "Creationism in Schools: The Decision in McLean versus the Arkansas Board of Education". Science. 215 (4535): 934–943. Bibcode:1982Sci...215..934.. doi:10.1126/science.215.4535.934. PMID 17821352.
- Overton, W. R. (1985). "Memorandum opinion of United States District judge William R. Overton in McLean v. Arkansas, 5 January 1982". In Gilkey, L. (ed.). Creationism on trial. New York: Harper & Row.

Legal offices
| Preceded by Seat established by 92 Stat. 1629 | Judge of the United States District Court for the Eastern District of Arkansas; 1979–1987 | Succeeded by Stephen M. Reasoner |
