= Brian S. Miller =

American judge (born 1967)

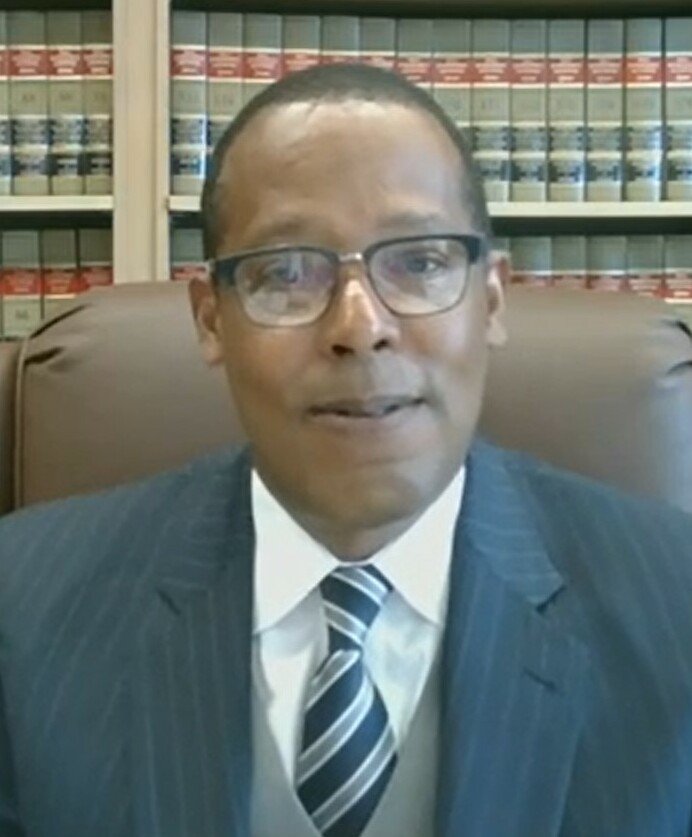
- Miller in 2020

Chief Judge of the United States District Court for the Eastern District of Arkansas
- In office July 23, 2012 – July 23, 2019
- Preceded by: James Leon Holmes
- Succeeded by: D. Price Marshall Jr.

Judge of the United States District Court for the Eastern District of Arkansas
- Incumbent
- Assumed office April 17, 2008
- Appointed by: George W. Bush
- Preceded by: George Howard Jr.

Personal details
- Born: Brian Stacy Miller; January 24, 1967 (age 59) Pine Bluff, Arkansas, U.S.
- Education: Phillips County Community College (AA); University of Central Arkansas (BS); Vanderbilt Law School (JD)

Military service
- Allegiance: United States
- Branch/service: United States Navy (1985–1989); United States Navy Reserve (1984, 1989–1992)

Brian Stacy Miller (born January 24, 1967) is a United States district judge of the United States District Court for the Eastern District of Arkansas.

== Early life and education ==
Born in Pine Bluff, Arkansas, Miller grew up in Helena, Arkansas. Upon graduating from Helena-West Helena Central High School in 1985, he entered active duty in the United States Navy in June 1985 and served as a Boatswain's Mate on the USS New Jersey from 1986 to 1989. He served in the United States Navy Reserve in 1984 and from 1989 to 1992.

After being honorably discharged from active duty, he attended Phillips County Community College of the University of Arkansas in Helena and received an Associate of Arts degree in 1991. He received a Bachelor of Science degree, with honors, from the University of Central Arkansas in 1992 and a Juris Doctor from Vanderbilt Law School in 1995.

== Career ==
He joined the Memphis, Tennessee, law firm of Martin, Tate, Morrow & Marston, P.C. in 1995 and opened the Miller Law Firm in Helena in 1998. He was elected city attorney for his hometown of Helena in 1998 and served in that position from 1999 to 2006. He also served as city attorney for the towns of Lakeview, Arkansas and Edmondson, Arkansas and as city judge for Holly Grove, Arkansas. He served as deputy prosecuting attorney of Phillips County, Arkansas from 2000 to 2006.

In 2007, Miller was appointed to the Arkansas Court of Appeals by Arkansas Governor Mike Huckabee and served until 2008, when he was appointed to the United States District Court.

=== Federal judicial service ===
On October 16, 2007, Miller was nominated by President George W. Bush to a seat on the United States District Court for the Eastern District of Arkansas vacated by George Howard Jr. Miller was confirmed by the United States Senate on April 10, 2008, and received his commission on April 17, 2008. He served as Chief Judge from July 23, 2012, to July 23, 2019.

== Personal life ==
Miller is the great-grandson of Reconstruction era Arkansas State Representative Abraham Hugo Miller and noted businesswoman Eliza Ann Ross Miller. He is also the son of Arkansas politician and physician Robert Dan Miller Jr.

Miller is married with children and is Roman Catholic.

== See also ==
- List of African-American federal judges
- List of African-American jurists

== Sources ==
Legal offices
Preceded by George Howard Jr.	Judge of the United States District Court for the Eastern District of Arkansas; 2008–present	Incumbent
Preceded by James Leon Holmes	Chief Judge of the United States District Court for the Eastern District of Arkansas; 2012–2019	Succeeded by D. Price Marshall Jr.
