= James Maxwell Moody =

American judge (born 1940)

Senior Judge of the United States District Court for the Eastern District of Arkansas
- In office October 1, 2008 – March 7, 2014

Judge of the United States District Court for the Eastern District of Arkansas
- In office August 14, 1995 – October 1, 2008
- Appointed by: Bill Clinton
- Preceded by: Henry Woods
- Succeeded by: Kristine Baker

Personal details
- Born: James Maxwell Moody; February 15, 1940 (age 86) El Dorado, Arkansas, U.S.
- Spouse: Jo A. Cooper (died 1993)
- Children: James Maxwell Moody Jr.
- Education: University of Arkansas (BSIM, JD)

Military service
- Allegiance: United States
- Branch/service: United States Army
- Years of service: 1962–1966
- Rank: Second Lieutenant
- Unit: 2nd Armored Division

James Maxwell Moody Sr. (born February 15, 1940) is a retired United States district judge of the United States District Court for the Eastern District of Arkansas.

== Education and career ==
Moody was born in El Dorado, Arkansas. He received a Bachelor of Science in Information Management degree from the University of Arkansas in 1962. He received a Juris Doctor from the University of Arkansas School of Law in 1964 and passed the Arkansas bar examination in the same year.

He received a commission as a second lieutenant in the United States Army in June 1962 upon graduation from college. He served at Fort Sill, Oklahoma, from September to November 1964, and then with the Second Armored Division from November 1964 to September 1966 at Fort Hood, Texas.

In 1976, he taught constitutional law at the University of Arkansas at Little Rock. From 1980 to 1988, he served as a stockholder and later director of a catering company.

He was in private practice in Little Rock, Arkansas, in 1964 and from 1966 to 1995.

=== Federal judicial service ===
On June 27, 1995, President Bill Clinton nominated Moody to serve as a United States district judge of the United States District Court for the Eastern District of Arkansas, to a seat vacated by Judge Henry Woods. He was confirmed by the United States Senate on August 11, 1995, and received his commission on August 14, 1995. He assumed senior status on October 1, 2008, and retired on March 7, 2014.

== Personal life ==
His son, James M. Moody Jr., serves as a judge on the same court. Moody had previously indicated he would retire from the court when his son was confirmed by the Senate. He later retired on March 7, 2014.

== Sources ==
Legal offices
Preceded by Henry Woods	Judge of the United States District Court for the Eastern District of Arkansas; 1995–2008	Succeeded by Kristine Baker
