= Richard Sheppard Arnold United States Post Office and Courthouse =

- Little Rock US Post Office and Courthouse
- U.S. National Register of Historic Places
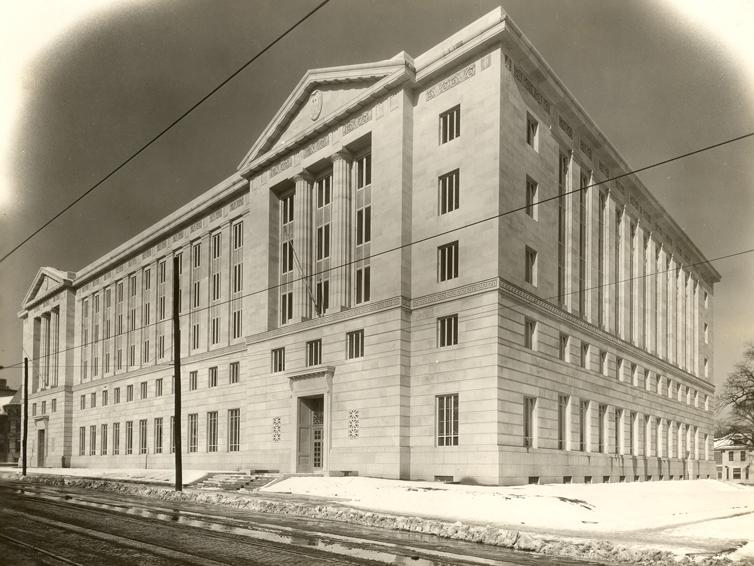
- The building as it appeared in 1932

- Location within Arkansas Location within the United States
- Location: 600 W. Capitol Ave., Little Rock, Arkansas
- Coordinates: 34°44′43″N 92°15′59″W
- Area: 2.1 acres (0.85 ha)
- Built: 1932
- Architect: Office of the Supervising Architect under James A. Wetmore and Louis Simon
- Architectural style: Classical Revival
- NRHP reference No.: 99001540
- Added to NRHP: December 23, 1999

The Richard Sheppard Arnold United States Post Office and Courthouse is a courthouse of the United States District Court for the Eastern District of Arkansas in Little Rock, Arkansas. Completed in 1932, in 2003 it was renamed for Court of Appeals judge Richard S. Arnold. It is located at 500 West Capitol Avenue. It was listed on the National Register of Historic Places in 1999 as Little Rock U.S. Post Office and Courthouse.

== Significance ==
After the Civil War ended, the city of Little Rock prospered as a cotton and lumber market and as the chief center of trade for Arkansas. The population had grown from 3700 in 1860 to 88,000 by 1940. During the growth period of the 1930s, the need arose for a larger post office. Thus, the United States Post Office and Courthouse in Little Rock was built in 1931–32, during one of the most difficult periods of American history, the Great Depression of the 1930s.

The passage of the Public Buildings Act of 1926 precipitated a period of building construction that was unprecedented in the United States. The Public Buildings Act specified that the office of the Supervising Architect of the Department of the Treasury would be responsible for the design and construction of all public buildings. James A. Wetmore was Acting Supervising Architect at the beginning of this period of construction. Since he retired in the early 1930s this may have been the last federal building whose construction he supervised. Though pre-dating the economic problems of the 1930s, the Public Buildings Act was the catalyst for the vast federal building program of the period and for providing jobs for thousands of construction workers around the country.

Wetmore signed the construction drawings for the design of the new postal facility in May 1931. Construction was completed by December 1932. The east wing of the building was extended to the north in 1941 with an addition designed by Louis Simon as Supervising Architect of the Treasury and W.G. Noll as Chief of Architecture. The 1941 extension replicated the exterior of the original building. The west wing of the building was extended to the north in 1987. The 1987 addition is an abstraction of the original design.

The building is located along the axis of the Arkansas State Capitol building and functions in both a visual and practical capacity to enhance the monumental quality of the state's capital city. It was renamed in honor of judge Richard Sheppard Arnold 2003. The building is symbolic of the federal presence in Little Rock and is a reminder of the growth of the federal government as evidenced in the building period of the 1930s.

== Architectural description ==
The monumental five-story limestone building was designed in the Academic Greek Revival style. The original 1932 building is approximately 251' wide and 151' deep; and the east wing addition of 1941, and west wing addition of 1987, extend the depth by 114' to approximately 265'. The composition of the main elevation consists of two projecting Greek distyle pavilions at the east and west ends resting upon a two-story rusticated base. The major horizontal zones of the building are clearly differentiated. The foundation and basement are gray granite, above which rise a first floor and mezzanine level of horizontally incised, rusticated limestone veneer, above which rise three floors of smooth finished (honed), flush jointed limestone which gives a monolithic appearance, except for fenestration and pilasters as described below.

The two Greek distyle temple pavilions consist of slightly projecting pediments, each supported by a pair of three-story, fluted Doric engaged columns, resting on the rusticated two-story base. Each end of the main elevation contains a main entrance beneath a raised temple front. A frieze of alternating limestone triglyphs and terra cotta metopes extends around the west, south and east elevations of the 1932 and 1941 buildings. The terra cotta metopes are composed of various configurations of tiles creating palmette and leaf and scroll motifs. The tiles are polychrome with a buff color relief, matching the limestone, on a gold or sienna field. Each tympanum has a central spread eagle cartouche, with the eagle heads reversed in order to face each other across the building. The recessed front elevations are very planar, consisting of alternating vertical window bays and fluted engaged pilasters at the third through the fifth floors resting, like the temple fronts, on the rusticated two-story base.

Exterior ornamentation is limited to the pilasters, the window system, the frieze described above, a terra cotta fretwork band separating the rusticated base from the smooth upper floors, and a shallow projecting cornice. The window system is designed to promote verticality in the bays. The windows are three light vertical steel casements whose light-colored vertical mullions are a visual design element. On the upper three floors, the windows are connected vertically by three-panel marble spandrels whose dividing rails form extensions of the window mullions. This presents an extremely vertical appearance where the two mullions extend upward continuously for three floors, separating the three-story pilasters.

A 50' wide, 114' long, east wing addition was added in 1941. This addition is indistinguishable from the original building, making the east elevation appear to be a contiguous 265' elevation. In 1987 however, another similar sized wing was designed not to replicate the original. While matching the original building in height and material, the west wing has no fenestration on its outer walls, and appears as a monolithic mass extending northward from the 1932 west wing. While it picks up the horizontal fretwork band (as a slightly decorated limestone band) and the frieze (as a band of plain white pre-cast concrete), the west wing lacks any vertical elements to complement the verticality of the 1932 structure's window system and pilasters.

Internally the building plan is typical of such post office and courthouse buildings of the period. It has a rectangular footprint on the first floor to accommodate the postal function (i.e. the large open work floor). Upper floors are gradually reduced in size via an E-shaped plan on the second and third floors, and the elimination of the central leg on the fourth and fifth floors to create a U-shaped plan.

Interior spaces consist of a grand postal lobby; postal offices and work areas; double-loaded public corridors with elevator lobbies, several courtrooms including the main ceremonial courtroom on the fourth floor; standard tenant office spaces throughout; and a utilitarian basement. Each of these areas is described in detail in their respective zone descriptions.

The site is bordered on all sides by public streets and sidewalks. Grading slopes downhill from the front (SE) on Capital Street to the rear (NE) on Fourth Street. On the east elevation the grade is lowered to partially expose the granite base course and basement windows; on the west elevation the grade level was maintained at the first floor level and the basement is lighted by areaways along the west side. Landscaping generally consists of a lawn border along the west, south and east elevations with two large evergreens flanking each front entry (the easternmost tree of the east entry has been lost), and assorted shrubs at the corners. Original Deco lighting standards flank all the entries of the 1932 and 1941 elevations.

== See also ==
- National Register of Historic Places listings in Little Rock, Arkansas
- List of United States post offices
