= List of federal judges appointed by Jimmy Carter =

The following is a list of all Article III United States federal judges appointed by President Jimmy Carter during his presidency. In total Carter appointed 262 Article III federal judges, including 56 judges to the courts of appeals, 203 judges to the United States district courts, 2 judges to the United States Court of Claims and 1 judge to the United States Court of Customs and Patent Appeals. Later presidents have exceeded Carter's total number of judicial appointments, which had itself surpassed the previous record of 235 set by Richard Nixon, but Carter retains the record for the largest number of judicial appointments in a single term.

Although Carter made no appointments to the Supreme Court of the United States, two of his Court of Appeals appointees—Stephen Breyer and Ruth Bader Ginsburg—were later elevated to the Supreme Court by Bill Clinton.

None of Carter's appointees remain in active status, however 9 appellate judges and 18 district judges remain on senior status. Four additional judges appointed by Carter to district courts remain on senior status as appellate judges by appointment of later presidents, as is one appellate judge appointed to the Supreme Court.

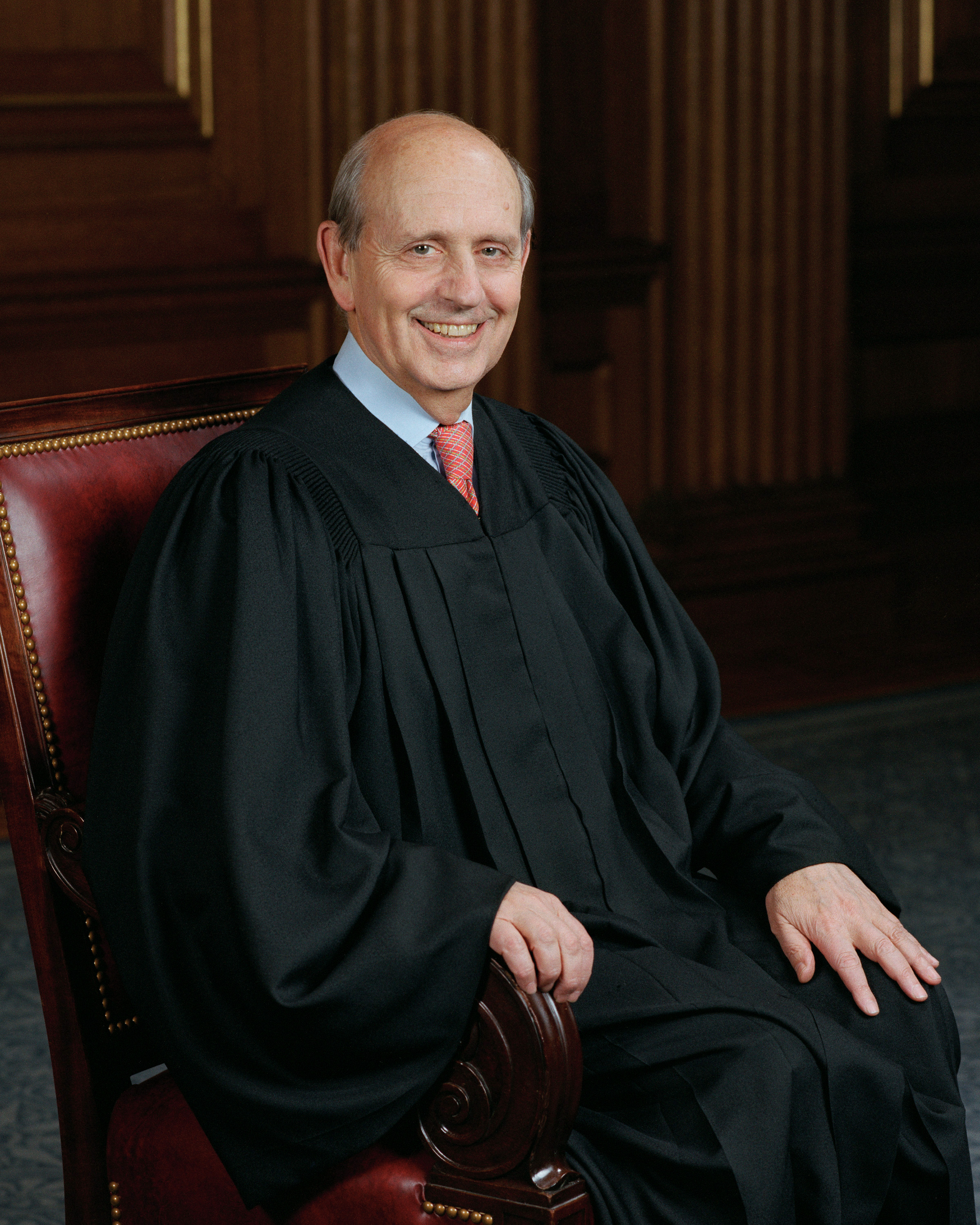
Stephen Breyer, named to the United States Court of Appeals for the First Circuit, was Carter's last Court of Appeals nominee to be confirmed, and was later elevated to the Supreme Court.

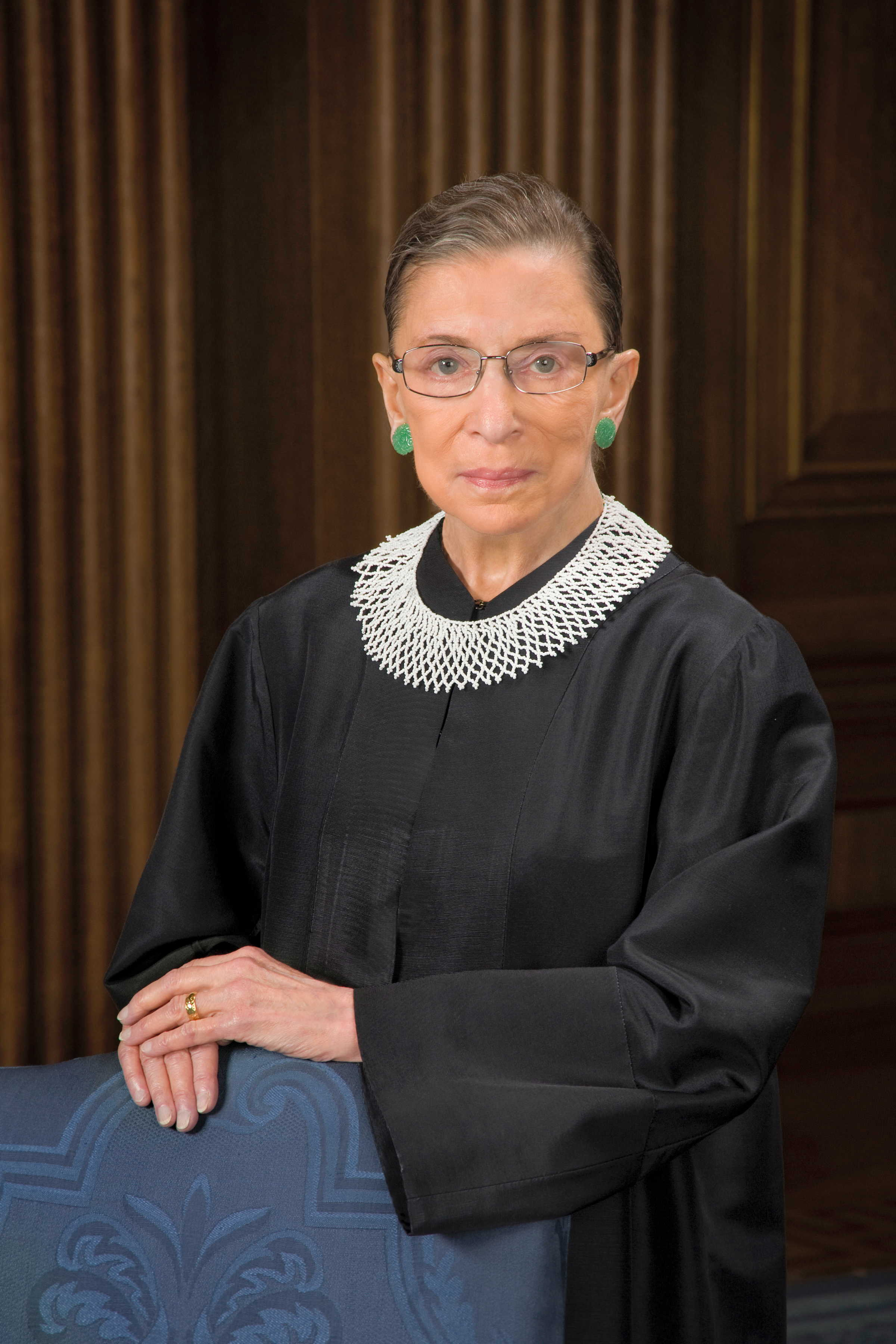
Carter appointed Ruth Bader Ginsburg to the United States Court of Appeals for the District of Columbia Circuit and she was later elevated to the Supreme Court.

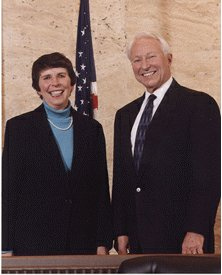
Carter's first Court of Appeals nominee to be confirmed, Procter Ralph Hug Jr. of the Ninth (right), who elevated to Ninth's Chief Judge, on day of transfer of Chief Judge to another Carter nominee to the same Circuit, Mary M. Schroeder (left).

== Courts of Appeals ==
#	Judge	Circuit	Nomination date	Confirmation date	Began active service	Ended active service	Ended senior status
1	Procter Ralph Hug Jr.	Ninth	August 29, 1977	September 15, 1977	September 15, 1977	January 1, 2002	November 30, 2017
2	Alvin Benjamin Rubin	Fifth	August 16, 1977	September 16, 1977	September 19, 1977	July 1, 1989	June 11, 1991
3	Hugh H. Bownes	First	September 19, 1977	October 7, 1977	October 11, 1977	January 1, 1990	November 5, 2003
4	A. Leon Higginbotham Jr.	Third	September 19, 1977	October 7, 1977	October 11, 1977	January 31, 1991	March 5, 1993
5	Thomas Tang	Ninth	August 29, 1977	October 7, 1977	October 12, 1977	October 12, 1993	July 18, 1995
6	Damon Keith	Sixth	September 28, 1977	October 20, 1977	October 21, 1977	May 1, 1995	April 28, 2019
7	Gilbert S. Merritt Jr.	Sixth	August 25, 1977	October 29, 1977	October 31, 1977	January 17, 2001	January 17, 2022
8	Monroe G. McKay	Tenth	November 2, 1977	November 29, 1977	December 1, 1977	December 31, 1993	March 28, 2020
9	Robert Smith Vance	Fifth / Eleventh	November 4, 1977	December 15, 1977	December 15, 1977	December 16, 1989	–
10	James Kenneth Logan	Tenth	November 4, 1977	December 15, 1977	December 16, 1977	August 31, 1994	July 15, 1998
11	James Dickson Phillips Jr.	Fourth	July 20, 1978	August 11, 1978	August 11, 1978	July 31, 1994	August 27, 2017
12	Theodore McMillian	Eighth	August 3, 1978	September 22, 1978	September 23, 1978	July 1, 2003	January 18, 2006
13	Phyllis A. Kravitch	Fifth / Eleventh	January 19, 1979	March 21, 1979	March 23, 1979	December 31, 1996	June 15, 2017
14	Frank Minis Johnson	Fifth / Eleventh	April 2, 1979	June 19, 1979	June 21, 1979	October 30, 1991	July 23, 1999
15	Amalya Kearse	Second	May 3, 1979	June 19, 1979	June 21, 1979	June 11, 2002	Incumbent
16	Jon O. Newman	Second	April 30, 1979	June 19, 1979	June 21, 1979	July 1, 1997	Incumbent
17	Dolores Sloviter	Third	April 4, 1979	June 19, 1979	June 21, 1979	June 21, 2013	October 12, 2022
18	R. Lanier Anderson III	Fifth / Eleventh	April 18, 1979	July 12, 1979	July 13, 1979	January 31, 2009	Incumbent
19	Reynaldo Guerra Garza	Fifth	April 30, 1979	July 12, 1979	July 13, 1979	July 7, 1982	September 14, 2004
20	Joseph W. Hatchett	Fifth / Eleventh	May 17, 1979	July 12, 1979	July 13, 1979	May 14, 1999	–
21	Albert John Henderson	Fifth / Eleventh	April 18, 1979	July 12, 1979	July 13, 1979	January 31, 1986	May 11, 1999
22	Carolyn Dineen King	Fifth	April 30, 1979	July 12, 1979	July 13, 1979	December 31, 2013	Incumbent
23	Francis Dominic Murnaghan Jr.	Fourth	May 8, 1979	July 12, 1979	July 13, 1979	August 31, 2000	–
24	Henry Anthony Politz	Fifth	May 3, 1979	July 12, 1979	July 13, 1979	August 10, 1999	May 25, 2002
25	Thomas Morrow Reavley	Fifth	May 17, 1979	July 12, 1979	July 13, 1979	August 1, 1990	December 1, 2020
26	Patricia Wald	D.C.	April 30, 1979	July 24, 1979	July 26, 1979	November 16, 1999	–
27	James Marshall Sprouse	Fourth	July 5, 1979	September 11, 1979	September 13, 1979	October 31, 1992	July 31, 1995
28	Bailey Brown	Sixth	March 15, 1979	September 25, 1979	September 26, 1979	June 16, 1982	December 31, 1997
29	Richard Dickson Cudahy	Seventh	May 22, 1979	September 25, 1979	September 26, 1979	August 15, 1994	September 22, 2015
30	Betty Binns Fletcher	Ninth	July 12, 1979	September 26, 1979	September 26, 1979	November 1, 1998	October 22, 2012
31	Cornelia Groefsema Kennedy	Sixth	April 9, 1979	September 25, 1979	September 26, 1979	March 1, 1999	May 12, 2014
32	Boyce F. Martin Jr.	Sixth	June 5, 1979	September 25, 1979	September 26, 1979	August 16, 2013	–
33	Abner Mikva	D.C.	May 29, 1979	September 25, 1979	September 26, 1979	September 19, 1994	–
34	Mary M. Schroeder	Ninth	May 3, 1979	September 25, 1979	September 26, 1979	December 31, 2011	Incumbent
35	Otto Richard Skopil Jr.	Ninth	June 14, 1979	September 25, 1979	September 26, 1979	June 30, 1986	October 18, 2012
36	Jerome Farris	Ninth	July 12, 1979	September 26, 1979	September 27, 1979	March 4, 1995	July 23, 2020
37	Samuel D. Johnson Jr.	Fifth	August 10, 1979	October 4, 1979	October 5, 1979	May 10, 1991	July 27, 2002
38	Nathaniel R. Jones	Sixth	August 28, 1979	October 4, 1979	October 5, 1979	May 13, 1995	March 30, 2002
39	Albert Tate Jr.	Fifth	July 31, 1979	October 4, 1979	October 5, 1979	March 27, 1986	–
40	Arthur Alarcón	Ninth	August 28, 1979	October 31, 1979	November 2, 1979	November 21, 1992	January 28, 2015
41	Thomas Alonzo Clark	Fifth / Eleventh	August 28, 1979	October 31, 1979	November 2, 1979	August 31, 1991	September 4, 2005
42	Harry Pregerson	Ninth	August 28, 1979	October 31, 1979	November 2, 1979	December 11, 2015	November 25, 2017
43	Stephanie Kulp Seymour	Tenth	August 28, 1979	October 31, 1979	November 2, 1979	October 16, 2005	Incumbent
44	Warren J. Ferguson	Ninth	September 28, 1979	November 26, 1979	November 27, 1979	July 31, 1986	June 25, 2008
45	Cecil F. Poole	Ninth	October 11, 1979	November 26, 1979	November 27, 1979	January 15, 1996	November 12, 1997
46	Dorothy Wright Nelson	Ninth	September 28, 1979	December 19, 1979	December 20, 1979	January 1, 1995	Incumbent
47	Richard S. Arnold	Eighth	December 14, 1979 (Note: Originally nominated on December 14, 1979. Nomination was withdrawn on December 19, 1979 and renominated on the same day.)	February 20, 1980	February 20, 1980	April 1, 2001	September 23, 2004
48	Harry T. Edwards	D.C.	December 6, 1979	February 20, 1980	February 20, 1980	November 3, 2005	Incumbent
49	William Canby	Ninth	April 2, 1980	May 21, 1980	May 23, 1980	May 23, 1996	Incumbent
50	Samuel James Ervin III	Fourth	April 2, 1980	May 21, 1980	May 23, 1980	September 18, 1999	–
51	Robert Boochever	Ninth	May 22, 1980	June 18, 1980	June 18, 1980	June 10, 1986	October 9, 2011
52	Ruth Bader Ginsburg	D.C.	April 14, 1980	June 18, 1980	June 18, 1980	August 9, 1993	Elevated
53	William Albert Norris	Ninth	February 27, 1980	June 18, 1980	June 18, 1980	July 7, 1994	October 24, 1997
54	Jerre Stockton Williams	Fifth	April 14, 1980	June 18, 1980	June 18, 1980	July 2, 1990	August 29, 1993
55	Stephen Reinhardt	Ninth	November 30, 1979	September 11, 1980	September 11, 1980	March 29, 2018	–
56	Stephen Breyer	First	November 13, 1980	December 9, 1980	December 10, 1980	August 2, 1994	Elevated

== District Courts ==
#	Judge	Court (Note: See List of United States district and territorial courts)	Nomination date	Confirmation date	Began active service	Ended active service	Ended senior status
1	Howell W. Melton	M.D. Fla.	March 29, 1977	April 25, 1977	April 26, 1977	February 1, 1991	December 18, 2015
2	William Hoeveler	S.D. Fla.	April 5, 1977	April 25, 1977	April 26, 1977	January 31, 1991	November 18, 2017
3	Finis E. Cowan	S.D. Tex.	May 19, 1977	June 13, 1977	June 14, 1977	June 30, 1979	–
4	Francis J. Boyle	D.R.I.	May 2, 1977	June 30, 1977	July 1, 1977	December 1, 1992	September 11, 2006
5	Russell Gentry Clark	W.D. Mo.	June 13, 1977	July 1, 1977	July 5, 1977	August 1, 1991	July 31, 2000
6	Edward Louis Filippine	E.D. Mo.	June 22, 1977	July 21, 1977	July 22, 1977	June 11, 1995	Incumbent
7	Harold Lloyd Murphy	N.D. Ga.	July 7, 1977	July 28, 1977	July 29, 1977	March 31, 2017	December 28, 2022
8	T. F. Gilroy Daly	D. Conn.	June 29, 1977	August 5, 1977	August 5, 1977	July 11, 1996	–
9	Earl Ernest Veron	W.D. La.	July 19, 1977	August 4, 1977	August 5, 1977	February 13, 1990	August 28, 1990
10	Harry H. MacLaughlin	D. Minn.	August 4, 1977	September 16, 1977	September 19, 1977	October 1, 1992	May 3, 2005
11	Nicholas John Bua	N.D. Ill.	July 19, 1977	October 7, 1977	October 11, 1977	November 4, 1991	–
12	Edward Huggins Johnstone	W.D. Ky.	August 25, 1977	October 7, 1977	October 11, 1977	October 22, 1993	June 26, 2013
13	Louis F. Oberdorfer	D.D.C.	September 16, 1977	October 7, 1977	October 11, 1977	July 31, 1992	February 21, 2013
14	Stanley Julian Roszkowski	N.D. Ill.	July 19, 1977	October 7, 1977	October 11, 1977	January 9, 1991	January 31, 1998
15	Thomas A. Ballantine Jr.	W.D. Ky.	September 27, 1977	October 12, 1977	October 12, 1977	November 29, 1991	February 18, 1992
16	Charles Proctor Sifton	E.D.N.Y.	August 16, 1977	October 12, 1977	October 12, 1977	March 18, 2000	November 9, 2009
17	Eugene Nickerson	E.D.N.Y.	August 16, 1977	October 20, 1977	October 21, 1977	January 1, 1994	January 1, 2002
18	Pierre N. Leval	S.D.N.Y.	October 17, 1977	October 29, 1977	October 31, 1977	November 8, 1993	Elevated
19	Elsijane Trimble Roy	E.D. Ark. W.D. Ark.	October 21, 1977	November 1, 1977	November 2, 1977	January 1, 1989	January 23, 2007; December 1, 1990
20	George C. Carr	M.D. Fla.	November 21, 1977	December 15, 1977	December 16, 1977	January 26, 1990	–
21	John L. Kane Jr.	D. Colo.	November 2, 1977	December 15, 1977	December 16, 1977	April 8, 1988	Incumbent
22	A. David Mazzone	D. Mass.	November 21, 1977 (Note: Renominated on January 26, 1978.)	February 7, 1978	February 10, 1978	June 3, 1993	October 25, 2004
23	Paul Allen Simmons	W.D. Pa.	November 22, 1977	April 6, 1978	April 7, 1978	June 1, 1990	October 9, 2014
24	Robert W. Sweet	S.D.N.Y.	February 17, 1978	April 25, 1978	April 28, 1978	March 1, 1991	March 24, 2019
25	Gustave Diamond	W.D. Pa.	March 22, 1978	May 1, 1978	May 2, 1978	January 31, 1994	October 30, 2021
26	Donald Emil Ziegler	W.D. Pa.	March 22, 1978	May 1, 1978	May 2, 1978	October 1, 2001	May 31, 2003
27	Ellen Bree Burns	D. Conn.	February 15, 1978	May 17, 1978	May 18, 1978	September 1, 1992	June 3, 2019
28	Robert Frederick Collins	E.D. La.	November 2, 1977	May 17, 1978	May 19, 1978	August 6, 1993	–
29	Harold H. Greene	D.D.C.	March 22, 1978	May 17, 1978	May 19, 1978	August 6, 1995	January 29, 2000
30	Leonard B. Sand	S.D.N.Y.	April 7, 1978	May 17, 1978	May 19, 1978	July 1, 1993	December 3, 2016
31	Jack Edward Tanner	E.D. Wash. W.D. Wash.	January 20, 1978	May 17, 1978	May 19, 1978	November 8, 1978; January 28, 1991	– January 10, 2006
32	Adrian G. Duplantier	E.D. La.	April 24, 1978	May 26, 1978	May 31, 1978	March 6, 1994	August 15, 2007
33	Shane Devine	D.N.H.	May 17, 1978	June 23, 1978	June 27, 1978	September 8, 1992	February 22, 1999
34	Mary Johnson Lowe	S.D.N.Y.	May 10, 1978	June 23, 1978	June 27, 1978	July 27, 1991	February 27, 1999
35	Santiago E. Campos	D.N.M.	June 2, 1978	July 10, 1978	July 12, 1978	December 26, 1992	January 20, 2001
36	Louis H. Pollak	E.D. Pa.	June 7, 1978	July 10, 1978	July 12, 1978	January 1, 1991	May 8, 2012
37	Jose Alejandro Gonzalez Jr.	S.D. Fla.	July 6, 1978	July 26, 1978	July 28, 1978	November 30, 1996	Incumbent
38	Harry E. Claiborne	D. Nev.	July 25, 1978	August 11, 1978	August 11, 1978	October 9, 1986	–
39	Norma Levy Shapiro	E.D. Pa.	August 1, 1978	August 11, 1978	August 11, 1978	December 31, 1998	July 22, 2016
40	Thomas A. Wiseman Jr.	M.D. Tenn.	August 1, 1978	August 11, 1978	August 11, 1978	November 3, 1995	March 18, 2020
41	Richard S. Arnold	E.D. Ark. W.D. Ark.	August 14, 1978	September 20, 1978	September 22, 1978	March 7, 1980	Elevated
42	Bruce Sterling Jenkins	D. Utah	August 28, 1978	September 20, 1978	September 22, 1978	September 30, 1994	November 7, 2023
43	Harold Baker	E.D. Ill. / C.D. Ill.	August 9, 1978	September 22, 1978	September 23, 1978	October 4, 1994	January 2, 2022
44	Patricia Boyle	E.D. Mich.	July 25, 1978	September 22, 1978	September 23, 1978	April 20, 1983	–
45	Julian A. Cook	E.D. Mich.	July 25, 1978	September 22, 1978	September 23, 1978	December 30, 1996	May 16, 2017
46	Mariana Pfaelzer	C.D. Cal.	August 8, 1978	September 22, 1978	September 23, 1978	December 31, 1997	May 14, 2015
47	Donald E. O'Brien	N.D. Iowa; S.D. Iowa	September 27, 1978	October 4, 1978	October 5, 1978	December 30, 1992; December 1, 1990	August 18, 2015 –
48	Berry Avant Edenfield	S.D. Ga.	September 27, 1978	October 10, 1978	October 11, 1978	August 2, 2006	May 9, 2015
49	Robert Keeton	D. Mass.	January 25, 1979	March 21, 1979	March 23, 1979	February 28, 2003	September 8, 2006
50	John J. McNaught	D. Mass.	January 25, 1979	March 21, 1979	March 23, 1979	February 1, 1991	–
51	David Sutherland Nelson	D. Mass.	January 25, 1979	March 21, 1979	March 23, 1979	September 27, 1991	October 21, 1998
52	John Garrett Penn	D.D.C.	January 19, 1979	March 21, 1979	March 23, 1979	March 31, 1998	September 9, 2007
53	Abraham David Sofaer	S.D.N.Y.	January 19, 1979	March 21, 1979	March 23, 1979	June 9, 1985	–
54	Rya W. Zobel	D. Mass.	January 25, 1979	March 21, 1979	March 23, 1979	April 1, 2014	July 4, 2026
55	David Owen Belew Jr.	N.D. Tex.	February 9, 1979	April 24, 1979	April 26, 1979	May 7, 1990	November 21, 2001
56	Martin F. Loughlin	D.N.H.	February 9, 1979	April 24, 1979	April 26, 1979	May 15, 1989	December 4, 1995
57	Robert Manley Parker	E.D. Tex.	February 6, 1979	April 24, 1979	April 26, 1979	June 17, 1994	Elevated
58	Mary Lou Robinson	N.D. Tex.	February 23, 1979	April 24, 1979	April 26, 1979	February 11, 2016	January 26, 2019
59	Barefoot Sanders	N.D. Tex.	February 6, 1979	April 24, 1979	April 26, 1979	January 1, 1996	September 21, 2008
60	Paul G. Hatfield	D. Mont.	March 15, 1979	May 9, 1979	May 10, 1979	February 9, 1996	July 3, 2000
61	Norman William Black	S.D. Tex.	February 23, 1979	May 10, 1979	May 11, 1979	December 6, 1996	July 23, 1997
62	George Edward Cire	S.D. Tex.	February 13, 1979	May 10, 1979	May 11, 1979	May 5, 1985	–
63	James DeAnda	S.D. Tex.	February 13, 1979	May 10, 1979	May 11, 1979	October 1, 1992	–
64	Joyce Hens Green	D.D.C.	March 2, 1979 (Note: Originally nominated on March 2, 1979. Nomination was withdrawn on March 6, 1979 and renominated on the same day.)	May 10, 1979	May 11, 1979	July 1, 1995	October 10, 2024
65	George P. Kazen	S.D. Tex.	March 7, 1979	May 10, 1979	May 11, 1979	May 31, 2009	March 9, 2018
66	Gabrielle Kirk McDonald	S.D. Tex.	February 27, 1979	May 10, 1979	May 11, 1979	August 14, 1988	–
67	William Overton	E.D. Ark.	March 7, 1979	May 10, 1979	May 11, 1979	July 14, 1987	–
68	Donald J. Porter	D.S.D.	March 15, 1979	May 10, 1979	May 11, 1979	March 16, 1992	February 17, 2003
69	Harold Duane Vietor	S.D. Iowa	March 15, 1979	May 10, 1979	May 11, 1979	December 29, 1996	July 23, 2016
70	Valdemar Aguirre Cordova	D. Ariz.	April 30, 1979	June 19, 1979	June 21, 1979	June 18, 1988	–
71	Marvin Aspen	N.D. Ill.	April 30, 1979	July 23, 1979	July 24, 1979	July 1, 2002	Incumbent
72	Susan H. Black	M.D. Fla.	May 22, 1979	July 23, 1979	July 24, 1979	September 3, 1992	Elevated
73	William J. Castagna	M.D. Fla.	June 5, 1979	July 23, 1979	July 24, 1979	June 29, 1992	December 18, 2020
74	Richard Paul Conaboy	M.D. Pa.	May 29, 1979	July 23, 1979	July 24, 1979	September 1, 1992	November 9, 2018
75	Warren William Eginton	D. Conn.	June 5, 1979	July 23, 1979	July 24, 1979	August 1, 1992	October 7, 2019
76	Orinda Dale Evans	N.D. Ga.	June 5, 1979	July 23, 1979	July 24, 1979	December 31, 2008	Incumbent
77	Lawrence K. Karlton	E.D. Cal.	June 5, 1979	July 23, 1979	July 24, 1979	May 28, 2000	July 11, 2015
78	James Byron Moran	N.D. Ill.	May 22, 1979	July 23, 1979	July 24, 1979	June 30, 1995	April 21, 2009
79	Sylvia H. Rambo	M.D. Pa.	May 29, 1979	July 23, 1979	July 24, 1979	April 18, 2001	August 30, 2024
80	Marvin Herman Shoob	N.D. Ga.	June 5, 1979	July 23, 1979	July 24, 1979	September 30, 1991	June 12, 2017
81	George Ernest Tidwell	N.D. Ga.	June 5, 1979	July 23, 1979	July 24, 1979	October 8, 1999	August 4, 2011
82	Robert L. Vining Jr.	N.D. Ga.	June 14, 1979	July 23, 1979	July 24, 1979	March 31, 1996	September 1, 2022
83	Robert Jackson Staker	S.D. W. Va.	June 14, 1979	September 11, 1979	September 13, 1979	December 31, 1994	September 30, 2005
84	Matthew J. Perry	D.S.C.	July 5, 1979	September 19, 1979	September 20, 1979	October 1, 1995	July 29, 2011
85	George Arceneaux	E.D. La.	June 12, 1979	September 25, 1979	September 26, 1979	April 6, 1993	–
86	Richard Bilby	D. Ariz.	June 5, 1979	September 25, 1979	September 26, 1979	May 29, 1996	August 11, 1998
87	Patrick Eugene Carr	E.D. La.	June 14, 1979	September 25, 1979	September 26, 1979	October 1, 1991	June 1, 1998
88	Jim Carrigan	D. Colo.	June 1, 1979	September 25, 1979	September 26, 1979	October 10, 1994	August 19, 1995
89	Avern Cohn	E.D. Mich.	May 17, 1979	September 25, 1979	September 26, 1979	October 9, 1999	February 4, 2022
90	Benjamin F. Gibson	W.D. Mich.	July 12, 1979	September 25, 1979	September 26, 1979	July 13, 1996	January 31, 1999
91	Falcon Black Hawkins Jr.	D.S.C.	June 5, 1979	September 25, 1979	September 26, 1979	October 1, 1993	July 20, 2005
92	Douglas Woodruff Hillman	W.D. Mich.	July 12, 1979	September 25, 1979	September 26, 1979	February 15, 1991	October 1, 2002
93	Charles Weston Houck	D.S.C.	June 5, 1979	September 25, 1979	September 26, 1979	October 1, 2003	July 19, 2017
94	William L. Hungate	E.D. Mo.	May 17, 1979	September 25, 1979	September 26, 1979	October 1, 1991	June 30, 1992
95	Stewart Albert Newblatt	E.D. Mich.	May 17, 1979	September 25, 1979	September 26, 1979	December 23, 1993	December 27, 2022
96	John Victor Parker	M.D. La.	May 24, 1979	September 25, 1979	September 26, 1979	October 31, 1998	July 14, 2014
97	Edward Cornelius Reed Jr.	D. Nev.	April 12, 1979	September 25, 1979	September 26, 1979	July 15, 1992	June 1, 2013
98	Howard F. Sachs	W.D. Mo.	May 17, 1979	September 25, 1979	September 26, 1979	October 31, 1992	Incumbent
99	John Malach Shaw	W.D. La.	June 5, 1979	September 25, 1979	September 26, 1979	November 15, 1996	December 24, 1999
100	Zita Leeson Weinshienk	D. Colo.	June 1, 1979	September 25, 1979	September 26, 1979	April 3, 1998	March 31, 2011
101	Veronica DiCarlo Wicker	E.D. La.	June 5, 1979	September 25, 1979	September 26, 1979	December 10, 1994	–
102	Scott Olin Wright	W.D. Mo.	May 24, 1979	September 25, 1979	September 26, 1979	October 5, 1991	July 11, 2016
103	William L. Beatty	S.D. Ill.	July 31, 1979	October 4, 1979	October 5, 1979	November 9, 1992	July 22, 2001
104	Gene Edward Brooks	S.D. Ind.	July 27, 1979	October 4, 1979	October 5, 1979	December 31, 1996	–
105	Jerry Buchmeyer	N.D. Tex.	August 3, 1979	October 4, 1979	October 5, 1979	September 5, 2003	September 21, 2009
106	Edward B. Davis	S.D. Fla.	August 10, 1979	October 4, 1979	October 5, 1979	June 30, 2000	–
107	Hugh Gibson	S.D. Tex.	July 31, 1979	October 4, 1979	October 5, 1979	November 1, 1989	June 18, 1998
108	Lynn Carlton Higby	N.D. Fla.	June 14, 1979	October 4, 1979	October 5, 1979	January 3, 1983	–
109	Joseph C. Howard Sr.	D. Md.	May 22, 1979	October 4, 1979	October 5, 1979	November 15, 1991	September 16, 2000
110	Shirley Brannock Jones	D. Md.	May 22, 1979	October 4, 1979	October 5, 1979	December 31, 1982	–
111	James W. Kehoe	S.D. Fla.	July 18, 1979	October 4, 1979	October 5, 1979	October 16, 1992	December 13, 1998
112	George J. Mitchell	D. Me.	July 31, 1979	October 4, 1979	October 5, 1979	May 16, 1980	–
113	James Carriger Paine	S.D. Fla.	July 12, 1979	October 4, 1979	October 5, 1979	May 20, 1992	March 7, 2010
114	Eugene P. Spellman	S.D. Fla.	July 21, 1979	October 4, 1979	October 5, 1979	May 4, 1991	–
115	Harold A. Ackerman	D.N.J.	September 28, 1979	October 31, 1979	November 2, 1979	February 15, 1994	December 2, 2009
116	Alan N. Bloch	W.D. Pa.	August 3, 1979	October 31, 1979	November 2, 1979	April 12, 1997	October 6, 2024
117	Thomas Rutherford Brett	N.D. Okla.	September 28, 1979	October 31, 1979	November 2, 1979	October 3, 1996	February 1, 2003
118	Juan Guerrero Burciaga	D.N.M.	July 19, 1979	October 31, 1979	November 2, 1979	November 9, 1994	March 5, 1995
119	Barbara Brandriff Crabb	W.D. Wis.	July 21, 1979	October 31, 1979	November 2, 1979	March 24, 2010	Incumbent
120	Dickinson R. Debevoise	D.N.J.	September 28, 1979	October 31, 1979	November 2, 1979	May 1, 1994	August 14, 2015
121	James O. Ellison	N.D. Okla.	September 28, 1979	October 31, 1979	November 2, 1979	November 7, 1994	November 22, 2014
122	Terence T. Evans	E.D. Wis.	July 21, 1979	October 31, 1979	November 2, 1979	August 11, 1995	Elevated
123	Robert Howell Hall	N.D. Ga.	September 28, 1979	October 31, 1979	November 2, 1979	December 31, 1990	October 14, 1995
124	Alcee Hastings	S.D. Fla.	August 28, 1979	October 31, 1979	November 2, 1979	October 20, 1989	–
125	Neal Peters McCurn	N.D.N.Y.	September 28, 1979	October 31, 1979	November 2, 1979	April 6, 1993	September 7, 2014
126	Scott Elgin Reed	E.D. Ky.	August 28, 1979	October 31, 1979	November 2, 1979	August 1, 1988	February 17, 1994
127	Dale E. Saffels	D. Kan.	September 28, 1979	October 31, 1979	November 2, 1979	November 16, 1990	November 14, 2002
128	H. Lee Sarokin	D.N.J.	September 28, 1979	October 31, 1979	November 2, 1979	October 5, 1994	Elevated
129	Frank Howell Seay	E.D. Okla.	September 28, 1979	October 31, 1979	November 2, 1979	September 25, 2003	November 1, 2026
130	Anna Diggs Taylor	E.D. Mich.	May 17, 1979	October 31, 1979	November 2, 1979	December 31, 1998	November 4, 2017
131	Anne Elise Thompson	D.N.J.	September 28, 1979	October 31, 1979	November 2, 1979	June 1, 2001	Incumbent
132	Lee Roy West	W.D. Okla.	September 28, 1979	October 31, 1979	November 2, 1979	November 26, 1994	April 24, 2020
133	Peter Beer	E.D. La.	October 11, 1979	November 26, 1979	November 27, 1979	April 12, 1994	February 9, 2018
134	William Bertelsman	E.D. Ky.	October 11, 1979	November 26, 1979	November 27, 1979	February 1, 2001	Incumbent
135	Dudley Hollingsworth Bowen Jr.	S.D. Ga.	July 19, 1979	November 26, 1979	November 27, 1979	June 25, 2006	Incumbent
136	Lucius Desha Bunton III	W.D. Tex.	October 11, 1979	November 26, 1979	November 27, 1979	December 1, 1992	January 17, 2001
137	James T. Giles	E.D. Pa.	October 11, 1979	November 26, 1979	November 27, 1979	February 11, 2008	October 3, 2008
138	Harry Lee Hudspeth	W.D. Tex.	October 11, 1979	November 26, 1979	November 27, 1979	June 30, 2001	January 31, 2016
139	Milton Lewis Schwartz	E.D. Cal.	September 28, 1979	November 26, 1979	November 27, 1979	January 20, 1990	October 3, 2005
140	Juan Pérez-Giménez	D.P.R.	October 23, 1979	December 5, 1979	December 6, 1979	March 28, 2006	December 10, 2020
141	Horace Ward	N.D. Ga.	November 1, 1979	December 5, 1979	December 6, 1979	December 31, 1993	April 23, 2016
142	David Kent Winder	D. Utah	November 1, 1979	December 4, 1979	December 6, 1979	June 8, 1997	May 19, 2009
143	José A. Cabranes	D. Conn.	November 6, 1979	December 5, 1979	December 10, 1979	August 12, 1994	Elevated
144	Robert James McNichols	E.D. Wash.	November 6, 1979	December 5, 1979	December 10, 1979	April 20, 1991	January 20, 1993
145	Terry J. Hatter Jr.	C.D. Cal.	September 28, 1979	December 19, 1979	December 20, 1979	April 22, 2005	Incumbent
146	Edward Dean Price	E.D. Cal.	November 1, 1979	December 19, 1979	December 20, 1979	December 31, 1989	November 3, 1997
147	Richard Alan Enslen	W.D. Mich.	November 30, 1979	December 20, 1979	December 21, 1979	September 1, 2005	February 17, 2015
148	William Matthew Kidd	S.D. W. Va. / N.D. W. Va.	November 30, 1979	December 20, 1979	December 21, 1979	January 15, 1990	December 20, 1998
149	Lyonel Thomas Senter Jr.	N.D. Miss.	October 11, 1979	December 20, 1979	December 21, 1979	July 30, 1998	May 18, 2011
150	Helen J. Frye	D. Ore.	December 3, 1979	February 20, 1980	February 20, 1980	December 10, 1995	April 21, 2011
151	Gilberto Gierbolini-Ortiz	D.P.R.	November 30, 1979	February 20, 1980	February 20, 1980	December 27, 1993	March 23, 2004
152	Diana E. Murphy	D. Minn.	November 30, 1979	February 20, 1980	February 20, 1980	October 13, 1994	Elevated
153	Owen M. Panner	D. Ore.	December 3, 1979	February 20, 1980	February 20, 1980	July 28, 1992	December 19, 2018
154	James A. Redden	D. Ore.	December 3, 1979	February 20, 1980	February 20, 1980	March 13, 1995	March 31, 2020
155	Robert G. Renner	D. Minn.	November 30, 1979	February 20, 1980	February 20, 1980	February 22, 1992	March 1, 2005
156	Barbara Jacobs Rothstein	W.D. Wash.	December 3, 1979	February 20, 1980	February 20, 1980	September 1, 2011	Incumbent
157	Henry Woods	E.D. Ark.	December 14, 1979	February 20, 1980	February 20, 1980	March 1, 1995	March 14, 2002
158	Truman McGill Hobbs	M.D. Ala.	January 23, 1980	April 3, 1980	April 3, 1980	February 11, 1991	November 4, 2015
159	Odell Horton	W.D. Tenn.	February 27, 1980	May 9, 1980	May 12, 1980	May 16, 1995	February 22, 2006
160	Norma Holloway Johnson	D.D.C.	February 28, 1980	May 9, 1980	May 12, 1980	June 18, 2001	December 31, 2003
161	John Trice Nixon	M.D. Tenn.	February 27, 1980	May 9, 1980	May 12, 1980	August 15, 1998	December 19, 2019
162	G. Ross Anderson	D.S.C.	April 18, 1980	May 21, 1980	May 23, 1980	January 29, 2009	March 1, 2016
163	William Earl Britt	E.D.N.C.	April 14, 1980	May 21, 1980	May 23, 1980	December 7, 1997	Incumbent
164	Clyde S. Cahill Jr.	E.D. Mo.	April 2, 1980	May 21, 1980	May 23, 1980	April 9, 1992	August 18, 2004
165	Charles Leach Hardy	D. Ariz.	April 2, 1980	May 21, 1980	May 23, 1980	June 2, 1990	December 24, 2010
166	John David Holschuh	S.D. Ohio	March 28, 1980	May 21, 1980	May 23, 1980	October 12, 1996	January 26, 2011
167	Patrick F. Kelly	D. Kan.	April 14, 1980	May 21, 1980	May 23, 1980	June 6, 1995	March 15, 1996
168	Frank Joseph Polozola	M.D. La.	April 2, 1980	May 21, 1980	May 23, 1980	January 15, 2007	February 24, 2013
169	Raul Anthony Ramirez	E.D. Cal.	December 14, 1979	May 21, 1980	May 23, 1980	December 31, 1989	–
170	Walter Herbert Rice	S.D. Ohio	April 14, 1980	May 21, 1980	May 23, 1980	November 30, 2004	Incumbent
171	Milton Shadur	N.D. Ill.	April 2, 1980	May 21, 1980	May 23, 1980	June 25, 1992	January 14, 2018
172	S. Arthur Spiegel	S.D. Ohio	April 14, 1980	May 21, 1980	May 23, 1980	June 5, 1995	December 31, 2014
173	George Washington White	N.D. Ohio	March 28, 1980	May 21, 1980	May 23, 1980	February 26, 1999	November 12, 2011
174	Ann Aldrich	N.D. Ohio	March 28, 1980	May 21, 1980	May 24, 1980	May 12, 1995	May 2, 2010
175	Elbert Bertram Haltom Jr.	N.D. Ala.	January 10, 1980	May 29, 1980	May 30, 1980	December 31, 1991	October 12, 2003
176	Robert Bruce Propst	N.D. Ala.	January 10, 1980	May 29, 1980	May 30, 1980	July 15, 1996	May 14, 2019
177	Robert Aguilar	N.D. Cal.	April 3, 1980	June 18, 1980	June 18, 1980	April 15, 1996	June 24, 1996
178	Horace Weldon Gilmore	E.D. Mich.	May 22, 1980	June 18, 1980	June 18, 1980	May 1, 1991	January 25, 2010
179	Justin L. Quackenbush	E.D. Wash.	May 9, 1980	June 18, 1980	June 18, 1980	June 27, 1995	October 27, 2024
180	Clyde Frederick Shannon Jr.	W.D. Tex.	December 19, 1979	June 18, 1980	June 18, 1980	January 1, 1984	–
181	Green Wix Unthank	E.D. Ky.	December 19, 1979	June 18, 1980	June 18, 1980	June 14, 1988	June 25, 2013
182	Filemon Vela Sr.	S.D. Tex.	January 22, 1980	June 18, 1980	June 18, 1980	May 1, 2000	April 13, 2004
183	Earl H. Carroll	D. Ariz.	June 2, 1980	June 26, 1980	June 30, 1980	October 10, 1994	February 3, 2017
184	Carmen Consuelo Cerezo	D.P.R.	May 14, 1980	June 26, 1980	June 30, 1980	February 28, 2021	–
185	U. W. Clemon	N.D. Ala.	January 10, 1980	June 26, 1980	June 30, 1980	January 31, 2009	–
186	Thelton Henderson	N.D. Cal.	May 9, 1980	June 26, 1980	June 30, 1980	November 28, 1998	Incumbent
187	Judith Keep	S.D. Cal.	May 9, 1980	June 26, 1980	June 30, 1980	September 14, 2004	–
188	Alfredo Chavez Marquez	D. Ariz.	June 2, 1980	June 26, 1980	June 30, 1980	July 25, 1991	August 27, 2014
189	Marilyn Hall Patel	N.D. Cal.	May 9, 1980	June 26, 1980	June 30, 1980	October 30, 2009	September 30, 2012
190	A. Wallace Tashima	C.D. Cal.	May 9, 1980	June 26, 1980	June 30, 1980	January 8, 1996	Elevated
191	Earl Ben Gilliam	S.D. Cal.	December 7, 1979	August 19, 1980	August 20, 1980	April 2, 1993	January 28, 2001
192	Myron H. Thompson	M.D. Ala.	September 17, 1980	September 26, 1980	September 29, 1980	August 22, 2013	Incumbent
193	Richard Erwin	M.D.N.C.	June 11, 1980	September 29, 1980	September 30, 1980	September 22, 1992	November 7, 2006
194	Hipolito Frank Garcia	W.D. Tex.	December 19, 1979	September 29, 1980	September 30, 1980	January 16, 2002	–
195	Susan Getzendanner	N.D. Ill.	June 4, 1980	September 29, 1980	September 30, 1980	September 30, 1987	–
196	George Howard Jr.	E.D. Ark. W.D. Ark	June 2, 1980	September 29, 1980	September 30, 1980	April 21, 2007; December 1, 1990	–
197	David Vreeland Kenyon	C.D. Cal.	June 20, 1980	September 29, 1980	September 30, 1980	October 27, 1995	July 31, 1997
198	Charles P. Kocoras	N.D. Ill.	June 2, 1980	September 29, 1980	September 30, 1980	June 30, 2006	Incumbent
199	Consuelo Bland Marshall	C.D. Cal.	June 20, 1980	September 29, 1980	September 30, 1980	October 24, 2005	Incumbent
200	James Harry Michael Jr.	W.D. Va.	April 9, 1980	September 29, 1980	September 30, 1980	October 31, 1995	August 29, 2005
201	Norman Park Ramsey	D. Md.	July 25, 1980	September 29, 1980	September 30, 1980	November 1, 1991	September 30, 1992
202	Richard Leroy Williams	E.D. Va.	April 9, 1979	September 29, 1980	September 30, 1980	May 1, 1992	February 19, 2011
203	Walter Heen	D. Haw.	February 27, 1980 (Note: Renominated on January 8, 1981. Withdrawn by President Reagan on January 21, 1981.)	–	January 1, 1981	December 16, 1981	–

== Specialty courts (Article III) ==
=== United States Court of Claims ===
#	Judge	Nomination date	Confirmation date	Began active service	Ended active service	Ended senior status
1	Daniel Mortimer Friedman	March 22, 1978	May 17, 1978	May 19, 1978	November 1, 1989	July 6, 2011
2	Edward Samuel Smith	June 30, 1978	July 26, 1978	July 28, 1978	June 1, 1989	March 22, 2001

=== United States Court of Customs and Patent Appeals ===
#	Judge	Nomination date	Confirmation date	Began active service	Ended active service	Ended senior status
1	Helen W. Nies	May 9, 1980	June 18, 1980	June 18, 1980	November 1, 1995	August 7, 1996

== Notes ==
Renominations

== Sources ==
- Federal Judicial Center
