= Gordon Elmo Young =

American judge (1907–1969)

Judge of the United States District Court for the Eastern District of Arkansas
- In office September 10, 1959 – August 20, 1969
- Appointed by: Dwight D. Eisenhower
- Preceded by: J. Smith Henley
- Succeeded by: Garnett Thomas Eisele

Personal details
- Born: Gordon Elmo Young; April 26, 1907 Malvern, Arkansas, U.S.
- Died: August 20, 1969 (aged 62)
- Education: University of Arkansas School of Law (LL.B.)

Gordon Elmo Young (April 26, 1907 – August 20, 1969) was a United States district judge of the United States District Court for the Eastern District of Arkansas.

== Education and career ==
Born in Malvern, Arkansas, Young received a Bachelor of Laws from the University of Arkansas School of Law in 1931. He was in private practice in Malvern from 1931 to 1939, and then in Pine Bluff, Arkansas until 1959.

== Federal judicial service ==
On August 18, 1959, Young was nominated by President Dwight D. Eisenhower to a seat on the United States District Court for the Eastern District of Arkansas vacated by Judge J. Smith Henley. Young was confirmed by the United States Senate on September 2, 1959, and received his commission on September 10, 1959. Young served in that capacity until his death on August 20, 1969.

== Sources ==
Legal offices
Preceded by J. Smith Henley	Judge of the United States District Court for the Eastern District of Arkansas; 1959–1969	Succeeded by Garnett Thomas Eisele
