= George Howard Jr. =

American judge

Judge of the United States District Court for the Eastern District of Arkansas
- In office September 30, 1980 – April 21, 2007
- Appointed by: Jimmy Carter
- Preceded by: Richard S. Arnold
- Succeeded by: Brian S. Miller

Judge of the United States District Court for the Western District of Arkansas
- In office September 30, 1980 – December 1, 1990
- Appointed by: Jimmy Carter
- Preceded by: Richard S. Arnold
- Succeeded by: Seat abolished

Personal details
- Born: George Howard Jr. May 13, 1924 Pine Bluff, Arkansas, U.S.
- Died: April 21, 2007 (aged 82) Pine Bluff, Arkansas, U.S.
- Education: University of Arkansas (BS, JD)

George Howard Jr. (May 13, 1924 – April 21, 2007) was an American World War II veteran, attorney, and a United States district judge of the United States District Court for the Eastern District of Arkansas and the United States District Court for the Western District of Arkansas. He was the first African-American United States district judge in Arkansas. Howard played an important role in the Whitewater controversy, presiding over several Whitewater-related cases, including the separate trials of Jim and Susan McDougal, and once called on President Bill Clinton to testify.

== Early life ==
Howard was born in Pine Bluff, Arkansas on May 13, 1924. As a teenager he left home to serve in the United States Navy during World War II, a time when he was subjected to racism that would inspire him to become a lawyer. Howard served in the Navy from 1943 to 1946, and after completing his military service he finished high school and went on to Lincoln University School of Law in St. Louis, Missouri, where he graduated with honors from their pre-law program. He then entered the University of Arkansas and became the first African-American to live in campus housing at the school. Howard enrolled at the University of Arkansas School of Law and received his Juris Doctor in 1954. Howard is named as one of the "Six Pioneers," the first six African-American students to attend to University of Arkansas School of Law. Howard then returned to Pine Bluff and established a law practice, which he operated from 1954 to 1977, and in 1979. During this period he ran his only political campaign, an unsuccessful city council bid, and served as president of the State Council of Branches for the National Association for the Advancement of Colored People. Governor Winthrop Rockefeller appointed Howard to the Arkansas State Claims Commission in 1967, and was Chairman of the Commission from 1969 until 1977, when Governor David Pryor named him Arkansas Supreme Court justice. In 1979, Governor Bill Clinton appointed Howard as a judge of the Arkansas Court of Appeals.

== Federal judicial service ==
Howard was nominated by President Jimmy Carter on June 2, 1980, to a joint seat on the United States District Court for the Eastern District of Arkansas and the United States District Court for the Western District of Arkansas vacated by Judge Richard S. Arnold. He was confirmed by the United States Senate on September 29, 1980, and received his commission on September 30, 1980. His service in the Western District terminated on December 1, 1990, due to his reassignment to serve in the Eastern District only. His service in the Eastern District terminated on April 21, 2007, due to his death in Pine Bluff.

== Notable case ==
Howard played an important judicial role in the Whitewater trial, which led to the downfall of then- Arkansas Governor Jim Guy Tucker. During the Whitewater trials, Howard called for video testimony from Clinton, the man who had appointed him to the court of appeals years earlier.

== Legacy ==
A member of the 1994 class of the Arkansas Black Hall of Fame, Howard was known for his fairness and commitment to civil rights. He made the daily drive from his home in Pine Bluff to Little Rock, Arkansas to carry out his judicial duties, despite being slowed in his later years by declining health.

== Death and honors ==
Howard died April 21, 2007, at Jefferson Regional Medical Center, after battling health issues for several years. Three days later, on April 24, United States Representative Mike Ross and Arkansas Senators Blanche Lincoln and Mark Pryor introduced legislation before the House of Representatives and the Senate to rename the Pine Bluff federal building and courthouse after Howard. Howard was honored on the floor of the House of Representatives on April 26, 2007. The legislation, brought before the House as H.R. 2011, renamed the building on 100 East 8th Avenue in Pine Bluff as the George Howard Jr. Federal Building and United States Courthouse. Howard, whose portrait hangs in the federal courthouses in Pine Bluff and Little Rock, has a scholarship fund maintained in his honor, The George Howard Junior Scholarship Fund at the William H. Bowen School of Law of the University of Arkansas at Little Rock. Howard was inducted posthumously into the Lincoln University Hall of Fame on October 10, 2008.

== See also ==
- List of African-American federal judges
- List of African-American jurists
- List of first minority male lawyers and judges in Arkansas
- Whitewater controversy

Legal offices
Preceded by Richard S. Arnold	Judge of the United States District Court for the Eastern District of Arkansas; 1980–2007	Succeeded by Brian S. Miller
Preceded by Richard S. Arnold	Judge of the United States District Court for the Western District of Arkansas; 1980–1990	Succeeded by Seat abolished
