= United States District Court for the Eastern District of Arkansas =

U.S. federal district court in Arkansas

- (E.D. Ark.)
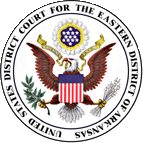
- Location: Richard Sheppard Arnold U.S. Post Office and Courthouse (Little Rock) More locations: Jacob Trieber Federal Building, United States Post Office, and United States Court House (Helena); Jonesboro
- Appeals to: Eighth Circuit
- Established: March 3, 1851
- Judges: 5
- Chief Judge: Kristine Baker

Officers of the court
- U.S. Attorney: Jonathan D. Ross
- U.S. Marshal: Cory Harris (Acting)
- www.are.uscourts.gov

The United States District Court for the Eastern District of Arkansas (in case citations, E.D. Ark.) is a federal court in the Eighth Circuit (except for patent claims and claims against the U.S. government under the Tucker Act, which are appealed to the Federal Circuit).

The District was established on March 3, 1851, with the division of the state into an Eastern and Western district.

The United States Attorney's Office for the Eastern District of Arkansas represents the United States in civil and criminal litigation in the court. As of November 17, 2021 the United States attorney is Jonathan D. Ross.

== Organization ==
The United States District Court for the Eastern District of Arkansas is one of two federal judicial districts in Arkansas. Court for the District is held at Helena, Jonesboro, and Little Rock.

Central Division comprises the following counties: Cleburne, Cleveland, Conway, Dallas, Drew, Faulkner, Grant, Jefferson, Lincoln, Lonoke, Perry, Pope, Prairie, Pulaski, Saline, Stone, Van Buren, White, and Yell.

Delta Division comprises the following counties: Arkansas, Chicot, Crittenden, Desha, Lee, Monroe, Phillips, and St. Francis.

Northern Division comprises the following counties: Clay, Craighead, Cross, Fulton, Greene, Independence, Izard, Jackson, Lawrence, Mississippi, Poinsett, Randolph, Sharp, and Woodruff.

== Current judges ==
As of October 28, 2025:

#	Title	Judge	Duty station	Born	Term of service			Appointed by
#	Title	Judge	Duty station	Born	Active	Chief	Senior	Appointed by
25	Chief Judge	Kristine Baker	Little Rock	1971	2012–present	2023–present	—	Obama
23	District Judge	Brian S. Miller	Little Rock	1967	2008–present	2012–2019	—	G.W. Bush
24	District Judge	D. Price Marshall Jr.	Little Rock	1963	2010–present	2019–2023	—	Obama
26	District Judge	James M. Moody Jr.	Little Rock	1964	2014–present	—	—	Obama
27	District Judge	Lee Rudofsky	Little Rock	1979	2019–present	—	—	Trump
19	Senior Judge	Susan Webber Wright	Little Rock	1948	1990–2013 (Note: In 1990, Judge Wright was jointly appointed to the Eastern and Western Districts of Arkansas.)	1998–2005	2013–present	G.H.W. Bush

== Former judges ==
#	Judge	Born–died	Active service	Chief Judge	Senior status	Appointed by	Reason for termination
1	Daniel Ringo	1803–1873	1851–1861 (Note: Reassigned from the District of Arkansas. Jointly appointed to the Eastern and Western Districts of Arkansas.)	—	—	Taylor/Operation of law	resignation
2	Henry Clay Caldwell	1832–1915	1864–1890 (Note: Judge Caldwell was jointly appointed to the Eastern and Western Districts of Arkansas from 1864 to 1871.)	—	—	Lincoln	elevation
3	John A. Williams	1835–1900	1890–1900	—	—	B. Harrison	death
4	Jacob Trieber	1853–1927	1900–1927 (Note: Recess appointment; formally nominated on December 4, 1900, confirmed by the United States Senate on January 9, 1901, and received commission on January 9, 1901.)	—	—	McKinley	death
5	John Ellis Martineau	1873–1937	1928–1937	—	—	Coolidge	death
6	Thomas Clark Trimble III	1878–1965	1937–1957	1948–1957	1957–1965	F. Roosevelt	death
7	Harry Jacob Lemley	1883–1965	1939–1958 (Note: Jointly appointed to the Eastern and Western Districts of Arkansas.)	—	1958–1965	F. Roosevelt	death
8	J. Smith Henley	1917–1997	1958–1959 (Note: Recess appointment; not confirmed by the Senate, but renominated to a different seat on the same court prior to the expiration of the initial appointment.)	—	—	Eisenhower	resignation
8.1	J. Smith Henley	1917–1997	1959–1975	1959–1975	—	Eisenhower	elevation
9	Gordon Elmo Young	1907–1969	1959–1969	—	—	Eisenhower	death
10	Oren Harris	1903–1997	1965–1976	—	1976–1997	L. Johnson	death
11	Garnett Thomas Eisele	1923–2017	1970–1991	1975–1991	1991–2017	Nixon	death
12	Terry Shell	1922–1978	1975–1978	—	—	Ford	death
13	Elsijane Trimble Roy	1916–2007	1977–1989	—	1989–2007 (Note: From 1989 to 1990, Judge Roy served as a Senior Judge of the Eastern and Western Districts of Arkansas.)	Carter	death
14	Richard S. Arnold	1936–2004	1978–1980	—	—	Carter	elevation
15	William Overton	1939–1987	1979–1987	—	—	Carter	death
16	Henry Woods	1918–2002	1980–1995	—	1995–2002	Carter	death
17	George Howard Jr.	1924–2007	1980–2007 (Note: From 1980 to 1990, Judge Howard was jointly appointed to the Eastern and Western Districts of Arkansas.)	—	—	Carter	death
18	Stephen M. Reasoner	1944–2004	1988–2002	1991–1998	2002–2004	Reagan	death
20	Billy Roy Wilson (Note: Appointed as William Roy Wilson Jr.; name changed in 2011.)	1939–2025	1993–2008	—	2008–2025	Clinton	death
21	James Maxwell Moody	1940–present	1995–2008	—	2008–2014	Clinton	retirement
22	James Leon Holmes	1951–present	2004–2018	2005–2012	2018–2020	G.W. Bush	retirement

== Chief judges ==
Chief judges have administrative responsibilities with respect to their district court. Unlike the Supreme Court, where one justice is specifically nominated to be chief, the office of chief judge rotates among the district court judges. To be chief, a judge must have been in active service on the court for at least one year, be under the age of 65, and have not previously served as chief judge.

A vacancy is filled by the judge highest in seniority among the group of qualified judges. The chief judge serves for a term of seven years, or until age 70, whichever occurs first. The age restrictions are waived if no members of the court would otherwise be qualified for the position.

When the office was created in 1948, the chief judge was the longest-serving judge who had not elected to retire, on what has since 1958 been known as senior status, or declined to serve as chief judge. After August 6, 1959, judges could not become or remain chief after turning 70 years old. The current rules have been in operation since October 1, 1982.

== Succession of seats ==
Seat 1
Seat reassigned from District of Arkansas on March 3, 1851 by 9 Stat. 594 (concurrent with Western District)
Ringo	1851–1861
Seat reassigned solely to the Eastern District on March 3, 1871 by 16 Stat. 471
Caldwell	1864–1890
Williams	1890–1900
Trieber	1901–1927
Martineau	1928–1937
Trimble III	1937–1957
Henley	1958–1959
Young	1959–1969
Eisele	1970–1991
Wilson	1993–2008
Marshall, Jr.	2010–present

Seat 2
Seat established on May 31, 1938 by 52 Stat. 584 (concurrent with Western District)
Lemley	1939–1958
Henley	1959–1975
Shell	1975–1978
Arnold	1978–1980
Seat reassigned solely to Eastern District on December 1, 1990 by 104 Stat. 5089
Howard, Jr.	1980–2007
Miller	2008–present

Seat 3
Seat established on May 19, 1961 by 75 Stat. 80 (concurrent with Western District)
Harris	1965–1976
Roy	1977–1989
Seat reassigned solely to Eastern District on December 1, 1990 by 104 Stat. 5089
Wright	1990–2013
Moody, Jr.	2014–present

Seat 4
Seat established on October 20, 1978 by 92 Stat. 1629
Overton	1979–1987
Reasoner	1988–2002
Holmes	2004–2018
Rudofsky	2019–present

Seat 5
Seat established on October 20, 1978 by 92 Stat. 1629
Woods	1980–1995
Moody	1995–2008
Baker	2012–present

== United States attorneys ==
Recent former US Attorneys for the district

- Timothy Griffin
- Bud Cummins
- Chris Thyer

== See also ==
- Courts of Arkansas
- List of current United States district judges
- List of United States federal courthouses in Arkansas
