= Susan Webber Wright =

American judge (born 1948)

Senior Judge of the United States District Court for the Eastern District of Arkansas
- Incumbent
- Assumed office August 22, 2013

Chief Judge of the United States District Court for the Eastern District of Arkansas
- In office 1998–2005
- Preceded by: Stephen M. Reasoner
- Succeeded by: James Leon Holmes

Judge of the United States District Court for the Eastern District of Arkansas
- In office January 24, 1990 – August 22, 2013
- Appointed by: George H. W. Bush
- Preceded by: Elsijane Trimble Roy
- Succeeded by: James M. Moody Jr.

Judge of the United States District Court for the Western District of Arkansas
- In office January 24, 1990 – December 1, 1990
- Appointed by: George H. W. Bush
- Preceded by: Elsijane Trimble Roy
- Succeeded by: Seat abolished

Personal details
- Born: Susan Webber Carter; August 1, 1948 (age 78) Texarkana, Arkansas, U.S.
- Spouse: Robert R. Wright III (m. 1983; died 2006)
- Education: Randolph-Macon Woman's College (BA); University of Arkansas (MPA, JD)

Susan Webber Wright (born August 1, 1948) is a senior United States district judge of the United States District Court for the Eastern District of Arkansas. Wright is a former judge on the United States Foreign Intelligence Surveillance Court. She received national attention when she first dismissed the sexual harassment lawsuit brought by Paula Jones against President Bill Clinton in 1998, and then, in 1999, found Clinton to be in civil contempt of court.

== Early life, education, and career ==
Born in Texarkana, Arkansas, Wright received a Bachelor of Arts from Randolph-Macon Woman's College in 1970 and a Master of Public Administration from the University of Arkansas at Fayetteville in 1973. She received her Juris Doctor from University of Arkansas School of Law in 1975. While there, she was a student of future president Bill Clinton in his course on admiralty law; she later challenged him on her grade. The dispute occurred after Clinton lost all the exams and offered students a B+; Wright had desired an A and, after negotiating with Clinton's then-fiancé, Hillary Rodham, Clinton agreed to give Wright an A.

A conservative Republican, Wright worked for the reelection campaign of Republican Representative John Paul Hammerschmidt in 1974.

Upon graduation, Wright served as a law clerk to J. Smith Henley of the United States Court of Appeals for the Eighth Circuit from 1975-76. She was a member of the faculty of the University of Arkansas at Little Rock School of Law from 1976–90, as an assistant professor and assistant dean from 1976–78, associate professor from 1980–83, and full professor from 1983-90.

She was a research assistant to the Arkansas Constitutional Convention in 1979, and a visiting professor, University of Arkansas at Fayetteville School of Law in 1980, to the Ohio State University College of Law in 1981, and to the Louisiana State University Law Center from 1982-83.

== Federal judicial service ==
Recommended by Hammerschmidt, Wright was appointed to both the Eastern District of Arkansas and the Western District of Arkansas by President George H. W. Bush on September 21, 1989, both seats having been vacated by Elsijane Trimble Roy. Wright was confirmed by the United States Senate on January 23, 1990, and received her commission the following day.

On December 1, 1990, she was reassigned to serve only on the Eastern District of Arkansas. Wright served as chief judge of that District from 1998 to 2005. She took senior status on August 22, 2013.

Wright also presided over Paula Jones's sexual harassment lawsuit against President Clinton. The claims were based on activity alleged to have taken place when Clinton was Governor of Arkansas and Jones worked in his office. Wright refused to grant Clinton absolute presidential immunity against the lawsuit, but nonetheless ruled that a sitting president could not be sued and deferred his trial until after his presidential term was over. The ruling to keep Jones from suing Clinton, while he was still president, was overturned by the Eighth Circuit.

Clinton then petitioned the U.S. Supreme Court to consider Wright's ruling. In a unanimous decision, the Supreme Court affirmed the decision of the Eighth Circuit Court of Appeals, thus allowing Jones's suit to go to trial while Clinton was still in office.

On April 1, 1998, Wright granted summary judgment to Clinton in a 39-page ruling that expressed exasperation with both Jones and her lawyers, and stated that she believed the case to be without legal merit. Jones's appeal to the Eighth Circuit was dismissed when Clinton settled with her out of court.

On April 12, 1999, Wright issued an order finding Bill Clinton to be in civil contempt of court.

Describing Clinton's conduct repeatedly as "contumacious", Webber wrote: "The record demonstrates by clear and convincing evidence that the President responded to plaintiff [Paula Jones]'s questions by giving false, misleading, and evasive answers that were designed to obstruct the judicial process ... It is difficult to construe the President's sworn statements in this civil lawsuit concerning his relationship with Ms. Lewinsky as anything other than a willful refusal to obey this court's discovery orders.... Simply put, the President's deposition testimony regarding whether he had ever been alone with Ms. Lewinsky was intentionally false, and his statements regarding whether he had ever engaged in sexual relations with Ms. Lewinsky likewise were intentionally false, notwithstanding tortured definitions and interpretations of the term 'sexual relations'."

Wright was also involved with Kenneth Starr's investigation of the Whitewater scandal, and issued numerous rulings, partly favorable and partly unfavorable, to Clinton. Notably, Wright imprisoned Susan McDougal for the maximum 18 months for civil contempt of court when McDougal refused to answer "three questions" about whether Clinton lied in his testimony.

Wright was appointed to a seven-year term on the United States Foreign Intelligence Surveillance Court by Chief Justice John Roberts. She was appointed on May 18, 2009, and her term expired on May 18, 2016.

== Personal life ==
In 1983, Wright married Robert R. Wright III, law professor and co-founder of The University of Arkansas at Little Rock's law school. Together, Robert and Susan had a daughter, Robin. On June 4, 2006, Robert R. Wright III, aged 74, died.

Legal offices
Preceded by Elsijane Trimble Roy	Judge of the United States District Court for the Western District of Arkansas; 1989–1990	Succeeded by Seat reassigned
Preceded by Elsijane Trimble Roy	Judge of the United States District Court for the Eastern District of Arkansas; 1989–2013	Succeeded by James M. Moody Jr.
Preceded by Stephen M. Reasoner	Chief Judge of the United States District Court for the Eastern District of Arkansas; 1998–2005	Succeeded by James Leon Holmes
