= George Howard Jr. Federal Building and United States Courthouse =

Historic courthouse in Pine Bluff, Arkansas, U.S.

- Federal Building-U.S. Post Office and Courthouse
- U.S. National Register of Historic Places
- Location within Arkansas Location within the United States
- Location: 100 E. 8th St., Pine Bluff, Arkansas, U.S.
- Coordinates: 34°13′17″N 92°0′11″W
- Area: less than one acre
- Built: 1967
- Architects: Erhart, Eichenbaum, Rauch & Blass and Edward F. Brueggeman
- Engineers: Leo L. Landauer & Associates
- Architectural style: Modern Movement
- NRHP reference No.: 100000626
- Added to NRHP: February 7, 2017

The George Howard Jr. Federal Building and United States Courthouse is a federal government building at 100 East 8th Street in Pine Bluff, Arkansas, United States. It is a roughly square building, three stories in height, with a steel frame and curtain glass exterior. Single-story brick sections project to the east and west of its main block, and the south side houses the building's service entrances. It was completed in 1967, and is a prominent local example of Modern architecture. It is also a significant local example of an urban renewal project; it was built in a swampy area previously occupied by "substandard housing". It was named in honor of Pine Bluff native George Howard Jr. in 2008, and continues to house Pine Bluff's main post office as well as federal courts.

The building was listed on the National Register of Historic Places in 2001.

== See also ==
- National Register of Historic Places listings in Jefferson County, Arkansas
