= Richard S. Arnold =

American judge (1936–2004)

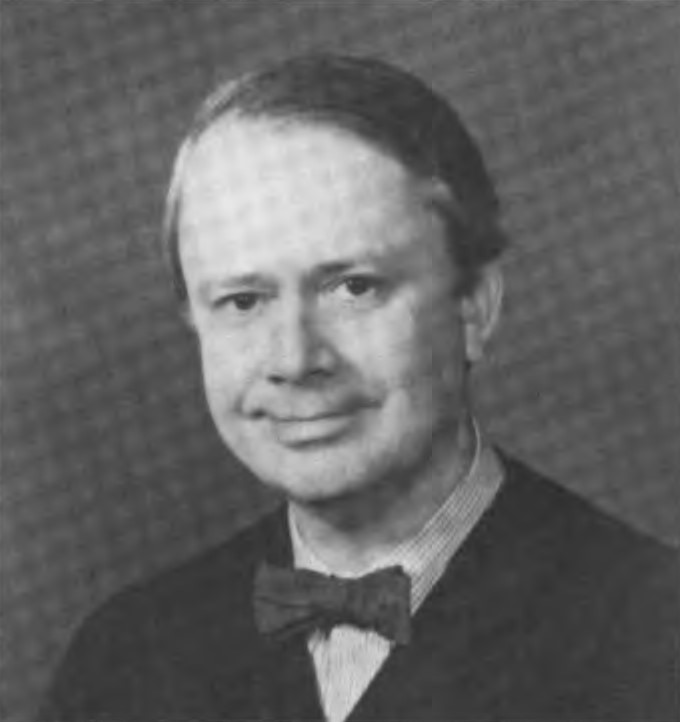

Senior Judge of the United States Court of Appeals for the Eighth Circuit
- In office April 1, 2001 – September 23, 2004

Chief Judge of the United States Court of Appeals for the Eighth Circuit
- In office 1992–1998
- Preceded by: Donald P. Lay
- Succeeded by: Pasco Bowman II

Judge of the United States Court of Appeals for the Eighth Circuit
- In office February 20, 1980 – April 1, 2001
- Appointed by: Jimmy Carter
- Preceded by: Seat established by 92 Stat. 1629
- Succeeded by: Lavenski Smith

Judge of the United States District Court for the Eastern District of Arkansas Judge of the United States District Court for the Western District of Arkansas
- In office September 22, 1978 – March 7, 1980
- Appointed by: Jimmy Carter
- Preceded by: Terry Shell
- Succeeded by: George Howard Jr.

Personal details
- Born: Richard Sheppard Arnold; March 26, 1936 Texarkana, Texas, U.S.
- Died: September 23, 2004 (aged 68) Rochester, Minnesota, U.S.
- Relatives: John L. Sheppard (great-grandfather); Morris Sheppard (grandfather); Morris S. Arnold (brother); Connie Mack III (cousin)
- Education: Yale University (BA); Harvard University (LLB)

Richard Sheppard Arnold (March 26, 1936 – September 23, 2004) was a United States district judge of the United States District Court for the Eastern District of Arkansas and the United States District Court for the Western District of Arkansas and then a United States Circuit Judge of the United States Court of Appeals for the Eighth Circuit.

== Education and career ==
Born on March 26, 1936, in Texarkana, Texas, Arnold received a Bachelor of Arts degree in 1957 from Yale University and a Bachelor of Laws in 1960 from Harvard Law School. At Yale, he was a member of the Calliopean Society. He served as a law clerk for Justice William J. Brennan Jr. of the Supreme Court of the United States from 1960 to 1961. He entered private practice in Washington, D.C. from 1961 to 1964. He continued private practice in Texarkana, Arkansas from 1964 to 1973. He was a delegate to the seventh Arkansas constitutional convention from 1969 to 1970. He was legislative secretary for Governor of Arkansas Dale Bumpers from 1973 to 1974. He was legislative assistant to United States Senator Dale Bumpers from 1975 to 1978.

== Federal judicial service ==
Arnold was nominated by President Jimmy Carter on August 14, 1978, to a joint seat on the United States District Court for the Eastern District of Arkansas and the United States District Court for the Western District of Arkansas vacated by Judge Terry Lee Shell. He was confirmed by the United States Senate on September 20, 1978, and received his commission on September 22, 1978. His service terminated on March 7, 1980, due to his elevation to the Eighth Circuit.

Arnold was nominated by President Carter on December 19, 1979, to the United States Court of Appeals for the Eighth Circuit, to a new seat authorized by 92 Stat. 1629. He was confirmed by the Senate on February 20, 1980, and received his commission on February 20, 1980. He served as Chief Judge and as member of the Judicial Conference of the United States from 1992 to 1998. He assumed senior status on April 1, 2001. His service terminated on September 23, 2004, due to his death in Rochester, Minnesota.

=== Relationship with Bill Clinton ===
As Governor of Arkansas, Bill Clinton befriended Arnold, and as President considered appointing Arnold to the United States Supreme Court. Jeffrey Toobin wrote of "Clinton ... weeping when he" told Arnold "he wasn't going to appoint him" because of Arnold's health.

== See also ==
- List of law clerks for the third seat of the Supreme Court of the United States
- Bill Clinton Supreme Court candidates

== Sources ==
- John Paul Frank; A. Leon Higginbotham Jr. (1993). "A Brief Biography of Judge Richard S. Arnold". scholarship.law.umn.edu. Minnesota Law Review. 1657.

Legal offices
Preceded by Terry Shell	Judge of the United States District Court for the Eastern District of Arkansas; Judge of the United States District Court for the Western District of Arkansas; 1978–1980	Succeeded by George Howard Jr.
Preceded by Seat established by 92 Stat. 1629	Judge of the United States Court of Appeals for the Eighth Circuit; 1980–2001	Succeeded by Lavenski Smith
Preceded by Donald P. Lay	Chief Judge of the United States Court of Appeals for the Eighth Circuit; 1992–1998	Succeeded by Pasco Bowman II
