= 2010 Arkansas elections =

General elections were held November 2, 2010 in Arkansas. Primaries were held on May 18, 2010 and runoffs, if necessary, were held on November 23, 2010. Arkansas elected seven constitutional officers, 17 of 35 state senate seats, all 100 house seats and 28 district prosecuting attorneys, and voted on one constitutional amendment and one referred question. Non-partisan judicial elections were held the same day as the party primaries for four Supreme Court justices, four appeals circuit court judges, and eight district court judges.

== Federal ==
=== United States Senate ===
Incumbent Democratic U.S. Senator Blanche Lincoln ran unsuccessfully for re-election against Republican John Boozman. Arkansas had previously only elected one Republican senator since the Reconstruction, who was defeated after his first term in 2002 by Mark Pryor. Lincoln faced Lieutenant Governor Bill Halter and narrowly won the primary contest.

United States Senate election in Arkansas, 2010
Party	Candidate	Votes	%	±%
Republican	John Boozman	451,617	57.90%	+13.83%
Democratic	Blanche Lincoln (incumbent)	288,156	36.95%	−18.95%
Libertarian	Trevor Drown	25,234	3.24%	+3.24%
Green	John Gray	14,430	1.85%	+1.85%
Majority		163,461	20.95%	
Turnout		779,437	37.5%	
Republican gain from Democratic		Swing		

=== United States House ===
All four of Arkansas's seats in the United States House of Representatives were up for election in 2010. Only one of the four incumbents sought re-election, Democrat Mike Ross of District 4.

==== Results U.S. Congress District 01 ====
Crawford counties in red, Causey counties in blue.

This was an open seat, as Democratic incumbent Marion Berry chose to retire. Berry was always reelected in this district by a wide margin since his first reelection campaign in 1998, and was unopposed in 2008. The district is very Republican (giving only 38% to Obama) on a national level despite a long history of electing Democrats to local and state level offices.

U.S. Congress District 01 election
Party	Candidate	Votes	%
Republican	Rick Crawford	93,224	51.79
Democratic	Chad Causey	78,267	43.48
Green	Ken Adler	8,320	4.62
Write-ins		205	0.11
Total votes		180,016	100
Republican gain from Democratic			

==== Results U.S. Congress District 02 ====
Results by county Griffin 50-60% 60-70% 70-80% Elliott 40-50%

This district was represented by seven term Democrat Vic Snyder who was unchallenged in 2008 and received 70% of the vote. Snyder announced that he would retire in 2010, reportedly after polls showed him trailing Republican Tim Griffin.

U.S. Congress District 02 election
Party	Candidate	Votes	%
Republican	Tim Griffin	122,091	57.90
Democratic	Joyce Elliott	80,687	38.27
Independent	Lance Levi	4,421	2.10
Green	Lewis Kennedy	3,599	1.71
Write-ins		54	0.03
Total votes		210,852	100
Republican gain from Democratic			

==== Results U.S. Congress District 03 ====
Womack counties in red, Whitaker counties in blue.

This district was represented by Republican John Boozman. Boozman ran for the U.S. Senate, against Blanche Lincoln. The district (comprising the northwest part of the state) has been held by the GOP since 1966.

U.S. Congress District 03 election
Party	Candidate	Votes	%
Republican	Steve Womack	148,581	72.44
Democratic	David Whitaker	56,542	27.56
Total votes		205,123	100
Republican hold			

==== Results U.S. Congress District 04 ====
Ross counties in blue, Rankin counties in red.

This district was represented by five term Democrat Mike Ross, who won reelection in 2008 with 86.2% of the vote against a Green Party challenger. Ross won reelection, albeit in his narrowest margin since first being elected in 2000. This is the last time a Democrat won a house (or any congressional) election in Arkansas.

U.S. Congress District 04 election
Party	Candidate	Votes	%
Democratic	Mike Ross (incumbent)	102,479	57.53
Republican	Beth Anne Rankin	71,526	40.15
Green	Josh Drake	4,129	2.32
Total votes		178,134	100
Democratic hold			

== Governor ==
Incumbent governor Mike Beebe easily won re-election and swept every single county.

Arkansas gubernatorial election, 2010
Party	Candidate	Votes	%	±%
Democratic	Mike Beebe (incumbent)	503,336	64.42	+8.81
Republican	Jim Keet	262,784	33.63	−7.03
Green	Jim Lendall	14,513	1.86	+0.21
Write-in		700	0.09	N/A
Total votes		781,333	100	
Democratic hold				

== Lieutenant governor ==
Incumbent Democratic Lieutenant Governor Bill Halter ran for Senate and did not seek re-election.

Arkansas lieutenant gubernatorial election, 2010
Party	Candidate	Votes	%
Republican	Mark Darr	386,693	51.05
Democratic	Shane Broadway	369,538	48.95
Total votes		756,231	100
Republican gain from Democratic			

== Secretary of State ==
2010 Arkansas Secretary of State election
Nominee	Mark Martin	Pat O'Brien
Party	Republican	Democratic
Popular vote	392,468	372,123
Percentage	51.33%	48.67%
- County results Martin: 50–60% 60–70% O'Brien: 50–60% 60–70% 70–80%
Secretary of State before election
Charlie Daniels
Democratic
Elected Secretary of State
Mark Martin
Republican

Democratic incumbent Charlie Daniels was term-limited and instead ran successfully for state auditor.

=== Democratic primary ===
==== Candidates ====
- Pat O'Brien, Pulaski County clerk
- Doris Tate, Sebastian County clerk
- Mark Wilcox, outgoing Arkansas Commissioner of State Lands

==== Primary results ====
Democratic primary results
Party	Candidate	Votes	%
Democratic	Pat O'Brien	149,453	48.85
Democratic	Mark Wilcox	105,809	34.59
Democratic	Doris Tate	50,655	16.56
Total votes		305,917	100

==== Runoff results ====
Democratic primary runoff results
Party	Candidate	Votes	%
Democratic	Pat O'Brien	151,046	61.58
Democratic	Mark Wilcox	94,239	38.42
Total votes		245,285	100

=== Republican nominee ===
- Mark Martin, state legislator

=== General election ===
2010 Arkansas Secretary of State election
Party	Candidate	Votes	%
Republican	Mark Martin	392,468	51.33
Democratic	Pat O'Brien	372,123	48.67
Total votes		764,591	100
Republican gain from Democratic			

== Attorney general ==
2010 Arkansas Attorney General election
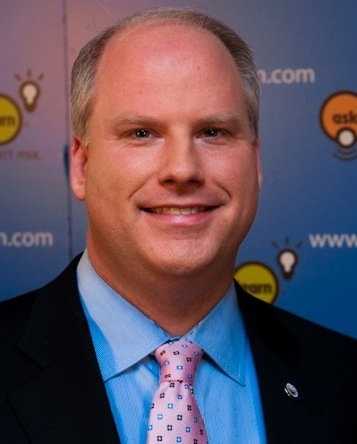

Nominee	Dustin McDaniel	Rebekah Kennedy
Party	Democratic	Green
Popular vote	525,940	193,658
Percentage	72.76%	26.79%
- County results McDaniel: 50–60% 60–70% 70–80% 80–90%
Attorney General before election
Dustin McDaniel
Democratic
Elected Attorney General
Dustin McDaniel
Democratic

Incumbent Dustin McDaniel won re-election in a landslide as no Republican filed to run for his seat.

=== Democratic nominee ===
- Dustin McDaniel, incumbent

=== Green Party nominee ===
- Rebekah Kennedy, attorney

=== Write-in candidate ===
- Marc Rosson, farmer

=== General election ===
2010 Arkansas Attorney general election
Party	Candidate	Votes	%
Democratic	Dustin McDaniel (incumbent)	525,940	72.76
Green	Rebekah Kennedy	193,658	26.79
Write-in		3,216	0.45
Total votes		722,814	100
Democratic hold			

== Treasurer ==
2010 Arkansas State Treasurer election

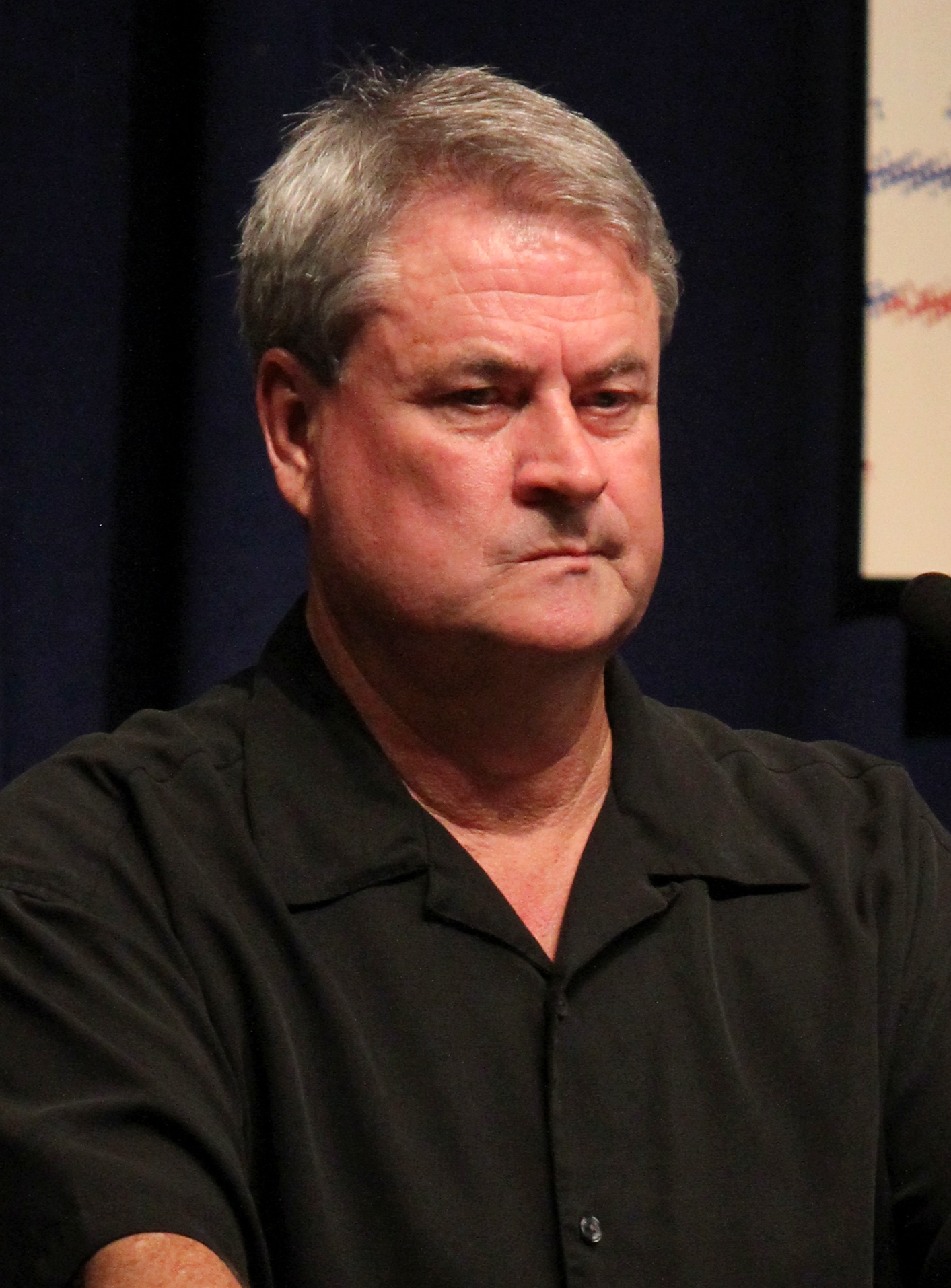
Nominee	Martha Shoffner	Bobby Tullis
Party	Democratic	Green
Popular vote	479,701	230,594
Percentage	67.54%	32.46%
- County results Shoffner: 50–60% 60–70% 70–80% 80–90%
Treasurer before election
Martha Shoffner
Democratic
Elected Treasurer
Martha Shoffner
Democratic

Incumbent Martha Shoffner comfortably won re-election, sweeping every county as no Republican filed to run.

=== Democratic nominee ===
- Martha Shoffner, incumbent

=== Green Party nominee ===
- Bobby Tullis, former state representative

=== General election ===
2010 Arkansas State Treasurer election
Party	Candidate	Votes	%
Democratic	Martha Shoffner (incumbent)	479,701	67.54
Green	Bobby Tullis	230,594	32.46
Total votes		710,295	100
Democratic hold			

== Auditor ==
2010 Arkansas State Auditor election
Nominee	Charlie Daniels	Mary Hughes-Willis
Party	Democratic	Green
Popular vote	506,606	210,476
Percentage	70.65%	29.35%
- County results Daniels: 50–60% 60–70% 70–80% 80–90%
Auditor before election
Jim Wood
Democratic
Elected Auditor
Charlie Daniels
Democratic

Incumbent Democrat Jim Wood was term-limited. Former Commissioner of State Lands and outgoing Secretary of State Charlie Daniels won in a landslide as no Republican filed to run.

=== Democratic nominee ===
- Charlie Daniels, former Secretary of State (2003-2011) and Commissioner of State Lands (1985-2003)

=== Green Party nominee ===
- Mary Hughes-Willis

=== General election ===
2010 Arkansas State Auditor election
Party	Candidate	Votes	%
Democratic	Charlie Daniels	506,606	70.65
Green	Mary Hughes-Willis	210,476	29.35
Total votes		717,082	100
Democratic hold			

== Commissioner of State Lands ==
2010 Arkansas Commissioner of State Lands election
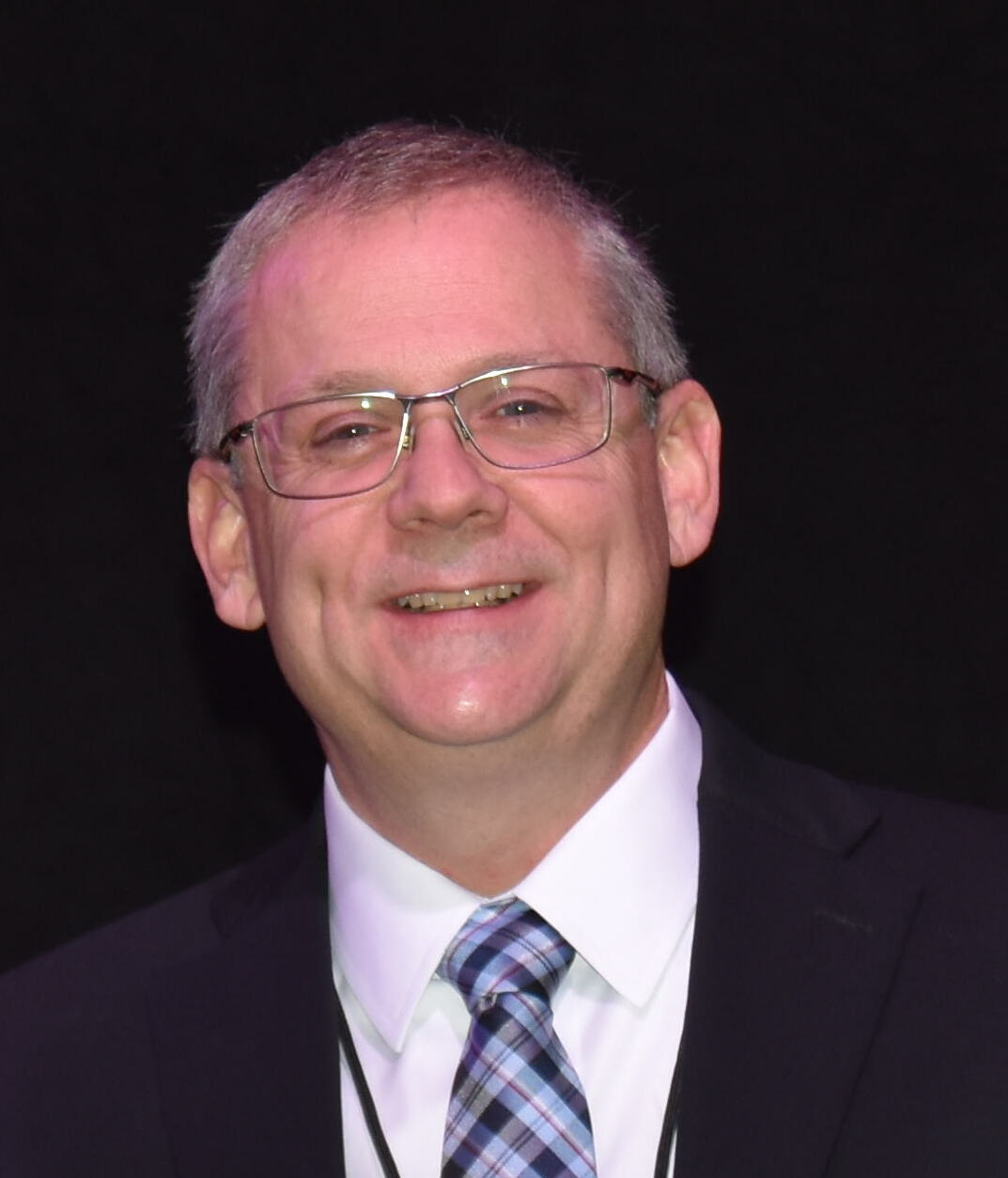

Nominee	John Thurston	L.J. Bryant
Party	Republican	Democratic
Popular vote	396,263	355,996
Percentage	52.68%	47.32%
- County results Thurston: 50–60% 60–70% 70–80% Bryant: 50–60% 60–70% 70–80%
Commissioner before election
Mark Wilcox
Democratic
Elected Commissioner
John Thurston
Republican

Incumbent Democrat Mark Wilcox was term-limited. Republican John Thurston narrowly won the election, becoming the first Republican land commissioner since Reconstruction.

=== Democratic primary ===
==== Candidates ====
- L.J. Bryant, tax-service owner
- Monty Davenport, cattle rancher and former state representative
- Mike Berg, church employee

==== Primary results ====
Democratic primary results
Party	Candidate	Votes	%
Democratic	L.J. Bryant	115,462	39.63
Democratic	Monty Davenport	112,110	38.48
Democratic	Mike Berg	63,779	21.89
Total votes		291,351	100

==== Runoff results ====
Democratic primary runoff results
Party	Candidate	Votes	%
Democratic	L.J. Bryant	141,448	58.89
Democratic	Monty Davenport	98,773	41.11
Total votes		240,261	100

=== Republican nominee ===
- John Thurston, church employee

=== General election ===
2010 Arkansas Commissioner of State Lands election
Party	Candidate	Votes	%
Republican	John Thurston	396,263	52.68
Democratic	L.J. Bryant	355,996	47.32
Total votes		752,259	100
Republican gain from Democratic			

== General Assembly ==
=== State Senate ===
17 of the 35 seats in the Arkansas Senate were up for election in 2010. The Democratic majority got significantly reduced due to the red wave.

2010 Arkansas Senate election
Party	Before	After	Change
Democratic	27	20	▼7
Republican	8	15	▲7
Total	35		

=== State House of Representatives ===
All 100 seats in the Arkansas House of Representatives were up for election in 2010. The Democratic majority got significantly reduced due to the red wave.

2010 Arkansas House of Representatives election election
Party	Before	After	Change
Democratic	71	55	▼16
Republican	28	45	▲17
vacant	1	0	▼1
Total	100		

== State Supreme Court ==
Two seats on the Arkansas Supreme Court were up for election.

=== Associate Justice, Position 3 ===
Deputy Attorney General Elana Wills was appointed by Governor Mike Beebe following the retirement of Justice Tom Glaze. She served the remainder of his term and was ineligible for re-election.

==== Candidates ====
- Courtney Henry, Arkansas Court of Appeals judge
- John Fogleman, circuit court judge

==== General election ====
2010 Arkansas Supreme Court Associate Justice Position 3 election
Party	Candidate	Votes	%
Nonpartisan	Courtney Henry	249,425	57.51
Nonpartisan	John Fogleman	184,280	42.49
Total votes		433,705	100

=== Associate Justice, Position 6 ===
Attorney Ronald Lee Sheffield was appointed by Governor Mike Beebe to serve the remaining term of retiring Justice Annabelle Clinton Imber after Bill Bowen, the original appointee, resigned after only a week citing illness.

==== Candidates ====
- Karen Baker, Arkansas Court of Appeals judge
- Tim Fox, circuit court judge
- Evelyn Moorehead, attorney

==== General election ====
2010 Arkansas Supreme Court Associate Justice Position 6 election
Party	Candidate	Votes	%
Nonpartisan	Karen Baker	206,365	48.35
Nonpartisan	Tim Fox	156,953	36.78
Nonpartisan	Evelyn Moorehead	63,450	14.87
Total votes		426,768	100

===== Runoff results =====
Runoff election results
Party	Candidate	Votes	%
Nonpartisan	Karen Baker	406,950	60.07
Nonpartisan	Tim Fox	270,502	39.93
Total votes		677,452	100

== Ballot measures ==
Three statewide measures were on the ballot in 2010, all of which were approved by the voters.

2010 Arkansas ballot measures
Name	Description	Votes				Type
Name	Description	Yes	%	No	%	Type
Amendment 1	Ensures the right to hunt, fish and trap wildlife in the state.	612,495	82.78	127,444	17.22	Legislatively referred constitutional amendment
Amendment 2	Eliminates interest rate restrictions on loans, contracts and bonds.	448,711	64.20	250,167	35.80	Legislatively referred constitutional amendment
Amendment 3	Removes fixed criteria for issuing economic development bonds.	431,724	62.35	260,735	37.65	Legislatively referred constitutional amendment
Source: Arkansas Secretary of State
