= 2024 Arkansas elections =

A general election was held in the U.S. state of Arkansas on November 5, 2024.

== State offices ==
=== State Treasurer (special) ===
Incumbent Republican treasurer Larry Walther cannot seek a full term following his appointment by Governor Sarah Huckabee Sanders after the death of Mark Lowery. Secretary of State John Thurston entered the race as a Republican candidate. Former state senator John Pagan entered the race as a Democratic candidate. Chief Economist Michael Pakko entered the race as a Libertarian candidate.

=== Supreme Court ===
Three seats on the Arkansas Supreme Court were up for election, two of which were contested. Justice Shawn Womack won reelection unopposed.

==== Chief Justice ====
Karen Baker was elected Chief Justice of the Arkansas Supreme Court in a runoff with 52.68% of the vote against Rhonda Wood after defeating Barbara Womack Webb and Jay Martin in the first round held in March.

==== Associate Justice (Position 2) ====
Incumbent Robin Wynne died on June 21, 2023. Governor Sarah Huckabee Sanders appointed Republican Party of Arkansas chairman Cody Hiland to Wynne's seat as an interim shortly after. As per the Constitution of Arkansas, Hiland was not eligible to run for this seat in 2024 and would have to resign once a new candidate is elected in a nonpartisan election.

===== Candidates =====
- Courtney Rae Hudson, Associate Justice (Position 3)
- Carlton Jones, Circuit Court Judge of the 8th Judicial Circuit - South

===== Nonpartisan General Election =====
Results by county Hudson: 50–60%; 60–70%; 70–80%; Jones: 50–60%; 70–80%

2024 Arkansas Supreme Court Associate Justice election
Party	Candidate	Votes	%
Nonpartisan	Courtney Rae Hudson	189,087	60.28%
Nonpartisan	Carlton Jones	124,619	39.72%
Total votes		313,706	100%

== General Assembly ==
=== State Senate ===
17 out of 35 seats in the Arkansas Senate were up for election.

=== State House of Representatives ===
All 100 seats in the Arkansas House of Representatives were up for election.

== Federal offices ==
=== President of the United States ===
Arkansas has 6 electoral votes in the Electoral College. Republican Donald Trump comfortably won the state with 64.2% of the vote.

=== U.S. House of Representatives ===
Arkansas has 4 seats in the United States House of Representatives. All incumbent Republicans held their seats.

== Ballot measures ==
Two statewide measures appeared on the ballot in 2024, both of which were approved.

=== Issue 1 ===
Results by county Yes: >90%; 80–90%

The Lottery Proceed Funding for Vocational-Technical School Scholarships and Grants Amendment would allow state lottery proceeds to fund scholarships and grants for vocational-technical schools and technical institutes.

2024 Arkansas Issue 1
Choice	Votes	%
For	1,029,102	89.59
Against	119,527	10.41
Total	1,148,629	100.00

=== Issue 2 ===
Results by county Yes: 60–70%; 50–60%; No: 50–60%

The Countywide Voter Approval for New Casino Licenses and Repeal Casino Licenses in Pope County Initiative would repeal the authorization for a casino license in Pope County and require countywide voter approval for any new casino licenses.

The initiative was funded by the Choctaw Nation of Oklahoma, while opposition was funded by Cherokee Nation Businesses, which were the licensees of the Pope County casino at issue.

2024 Arkansas Issue 2
Choice	Votes	%
For	638,655	55.81
Against	505,772	44.19
Total	1,144,427	100.00
