= 2024 Arkansas Supreme Court Chief Justice election =

- March 5, 2024 (first round); November 5, 2024 (runoff)
- Turnout: 18.29% ▼15.9 pp (first round); 38.67% (second round)
Candidate	Karen Baker	Rhonda Wood
First round	86,850; 27.17%	84,139; 26.33%
Runoff	546,713; 52.68%	491,148; 47.32%
Candidate	Barbara Webb	Jay Martin
First round	82,735; 25.89%	65,875; 20.61%
Runoff	Eliminated	Eliminated
- County results Baker: 20%-30% 30%-40% 40%-50% Wood: 20%-30% 30%-40% 40%-50% Webb: 20%-30% 30%-40% 40%-50% Martin: 20%-30% County results Baker: 50%-60% 60%-70% 70%-80% Wood: 50%-60%
Chief Justice before election
John Dan Kemp
Nonpartisan
Elected Chief Justice
Karen Baker
Nonpartisan

The 2024 Arkansas Supreme Court Chief Justice election was held in the U.S. state of Arkansas on March 5, 2024 to elect the chief justice, also known as position 1, of the Arkansas Supreme Court. Karen Baker and Rhonda Wood defeated Barbara Webb and Jay Martin in the first round. No candidate received a majority of the vote, so a runoff election took place on November 5, 2024. Baker defeated Wood by a margin of 5.36%. Baker was the first woman elected to the office.

Incumbent chief justice John Dan Kemp retired due to a state law that strips justices of their retirement benefits if they seek re-election after the age of 70.

Every candidate except Martin was currently serving as an Associate Justice on the Arkansas Supreme Court. Martin is an attorney who formerly served as a Democratic member of the Arkansas House of Representatives.

Arkansas Supreme Court elections are nonpartisan. Martin is a Democrat and both Wood and Webb have connections to the Republican Party. Wood was appointed to a judgeship by former Republican governor Mike Huckabee. Webb identifies as a conservative and is married to a former chairman of the Arkansas GOP. Republican governor Sarah Huckabee Sanders did not make an endorsement in the first round, but supported Wood in the runoff. Wood was also endorsed by the Republican Party of Arkansas and Republican senator Tom Cotton.

Abortion was the chief issue in the campaign. Wood wrote the majority opinion in Arkansans for Limited Government v. John Thurston, which affirmed the decision of Secretary of State John Thurston to disqualify a proposed ballot measure that would have enshrined the right to an abortion in the state constitution. Webb joined the majority opinion, while Baker wrote a dissent to the ruling. Jay Martin unsuccessfully ran for the Democratic nomination for Governor in 2022, expressing opposition to abortion.

== First round ==
2024 Arkansas Supreme Court Chief Justice election (first round)
Candidate	Votes	%
Karen Baker	86,850	27.17%
Rhonda Wood	84,139	26.33%
Barbara Webb	82,735	25.89%
Jay Martin	65,875	20.61%
Total votes	319,599	100.00

== Runoff ==
2024 Arkansas Supreme Court Chief Justice election (runoff)
Candidate	Votes	%
Karen Baker	546,713	52.68%
Rhonda Wood	491,148	47.32%
Total votes	1,037,861	100.00
