= 2026 Arkansas Supreme Court election =

- March 3, 2026

The 2026 Arkansas Supreme Court election was held on March 3, 2026, to elect two associate justices to the Arkansas Supreme Court.

== Position 3 ==
2026 Arkansas Supreme Court Position 3 election
- March 3, 2026
Candidate	Nicholas Bronni	John Adams
Party	Nonpartisan	Nonpartisan
Popular vote	217,332	179,940
Percentage	54.71%	45.29%
- Bronni: 50–60% 60–70% 70–80% Adams: 50–60% 60–70%
Arkansas Supreme Court Justice before election
Nicholas Bronni
Nonpartisan
Elected Arkansas Supreme Court Justice
Nicholas Bronni
Nonpartisan

Justice Nicholas Bronni, who was appointed in 2025 by Republican governor Sarah Huckabee Sanders to succeed Karen R. Baker, was challenged by former Democratic candidate for the Arkansas House John Adams. Bronni defeated Adams with 54.8% of the vote, maintaining the 5-2 conservative majority on court.

=== Candidates ===
==== Declared ====
- John Adams, attorney (D)
- Nicholas Bronni, incumbent justice (R)

=== Endorsements ===
Nicholas Bronni

Political parties

- Republican Party of Arkansas

=== Results ===
2026 Arkansas Supreme Court election, position 3
Candidate	Votes	%
Nicholas Bronni (incumbent)	217,332	54.71
John Adams	179,940	45.29
Total votes	397,272	100.00

== Position 6 ==
After only one candidate filed for the position the election was canceled, and incumbent justice J. Cody Hiland was elected without appearing on the ballot.

== See also ==
- 2026 Arkansas elections
