= 2020 Arkansas elections =

A general election was held in the U.S. state of Arkansas on November 3, 2020. To vote by mail, registered Arkansas voters had to request a ballot by October 27, 2020.

== State Supreme Court ==
One seat on the Arkansas Supreme Court was up for election.

=== Associate Justice, Position 4 ===
Incumbent Justice Josephine Hart chose not to run for re-election.

==== Candidates ====
- Barbara Womack Webb, former circuit court judge of Salinne County
- Morgan Welch, circuit court judge of Pulaski County

==== General election ====
Results by county Webb: 50–60%; 60–70%; Welch: 50–60%; 60–70%

2020 Arkansas Supreme Court Associate Justice Position 4 election
Party	Candidate	Votes	%
Nonpartisan	Barbara Womack Webb	245,736	53.63%
Nonpartisan	Morgan Welch	212,443	46.37%
Total votes		458,179	100%

== General Assembly ==
=== State Senate ===
17 out of 35 seats in the Arkansas Senate were up for election. Out of the contested seats, the Republican Party won 15 while the Democratic Party won two. The resulting composition was 28 Republicans and seven Democrats. Republicans flipped the 12th and 26th districts.

=== State House of Representatives ===
All 100 seats in the Arkansas House of Representatives were up for election. Republicans won 77 while Democrats won 23. Republicans flipped the 9th and 11th districts, while Democrats flipped the 32nd district.

== Federal offices ==
=== President of the United States ===
Arkansas had six electoral votes in the Electoral College. Donald Trump won the state with 62% of the vote.

=== U.S. Senate ===
Incumbent Republican senator Tom Cotton won reelection to a second term with 67% of the vote.

=== U.S. House of Representatives ===
Arkansas had four seats in the United States House of Representatives. The Republican Party won all of them; no seats changed hands.

== Ballot initiatives ==
Three statewide measures appeared on the ballot in 2020, two of which were approved.

=== Issue 1 ===
The Transportation Sales Tax Continuation Amendment, or simply Arkansas Issue 1, would support continuing a 0.5% sales tax, with revenue dedicated to state and local highways, roads, and bridges, that would otherwise expire in 2023.

==== Polling ====
Poll source	Date(s) administered	Sample size (Note: Key: A – all adults RV – registered voters LV – likely voters V – unclear)	Margin of error	For the amendment	Against the amendment	Undecided
University of Arkansas	October 9–21, 2020	405 (LV)	± 4.8%	62%	38%	–
Hendrix College/Talk Business & Politics	October 11–13, 2020	647 (LV)	± 4.9%	59%	31%	10%

==== Results ====
Issue 1 results by county Yes: 70–80%; 60–70%; 50–60%; No: 50–60%

Arkansas Issue 1
Choice	Votes	%
For	660,018	55.33
Against	532,915	44.67
Total	1,192,933	100.00

=== Issue 2 ===
The State Legislative Term Limits Amendment, or simply Arkansas Issue 2, would impose term limits of twelve consecutive years for state legislators with the opportunity to return after a four-year break.

==== Polling ====
Poll source	Date(s) administered	Sample size	Margin of error	For the amendment	Against the amendment	Undecided
University of Arkansas	October 9–21, 2020	405 (LV)	± 4.8%	60%	40%	–
Hendrix College/Talk Business & Politics	October 11–13, 2020	647 (LV)	± 4.9%	48%	28%	24%

==== Results ====
Issue 2 results by county Yes: 60–70%; 50–60%; No: 50–60%

Arkansas Issue 2
Choice	Votes	%
For	647,861	55.38
Against	521,979	44.62
Total	1,169,840	100.00

=== Issue 3 ===
The Initiative Process and Legislative Referral Requirements Amendment, or simply Arkansas Issue 3, would change requirements for citizen initiatives and legislative referrals.

==== Polling ====
Poll source	Date(s) administered	Sample size	Margin of error	For the amendment	Against the amendment	Undecided
University of Arkansas	October 9–21, 2020	405 (LV)	± 4.8%	41%	59%	–
Hendrix College/Talk Business & Politics	October 11–13, 2020	647 (LV)	± 4.9%	20%	35%	45%

==== Results ====
Issue 3 results by county Yes: 50–60%; No: 60–70%; 50–60%

Arkansas Issue 3
Choice	Votes	%
For	503,028	44.07
Against	638,319	55.93
Total	1,141,347	100.00

== See also ==
- Elections in Arkansas
- Politics of Arkansas
- Political party strength in Arkansas
