= List of United States attorneys for the Eastern District of Arkansas =

United States Attorney for the Eastern District of Arkansas
- Seal of the Department of Justice

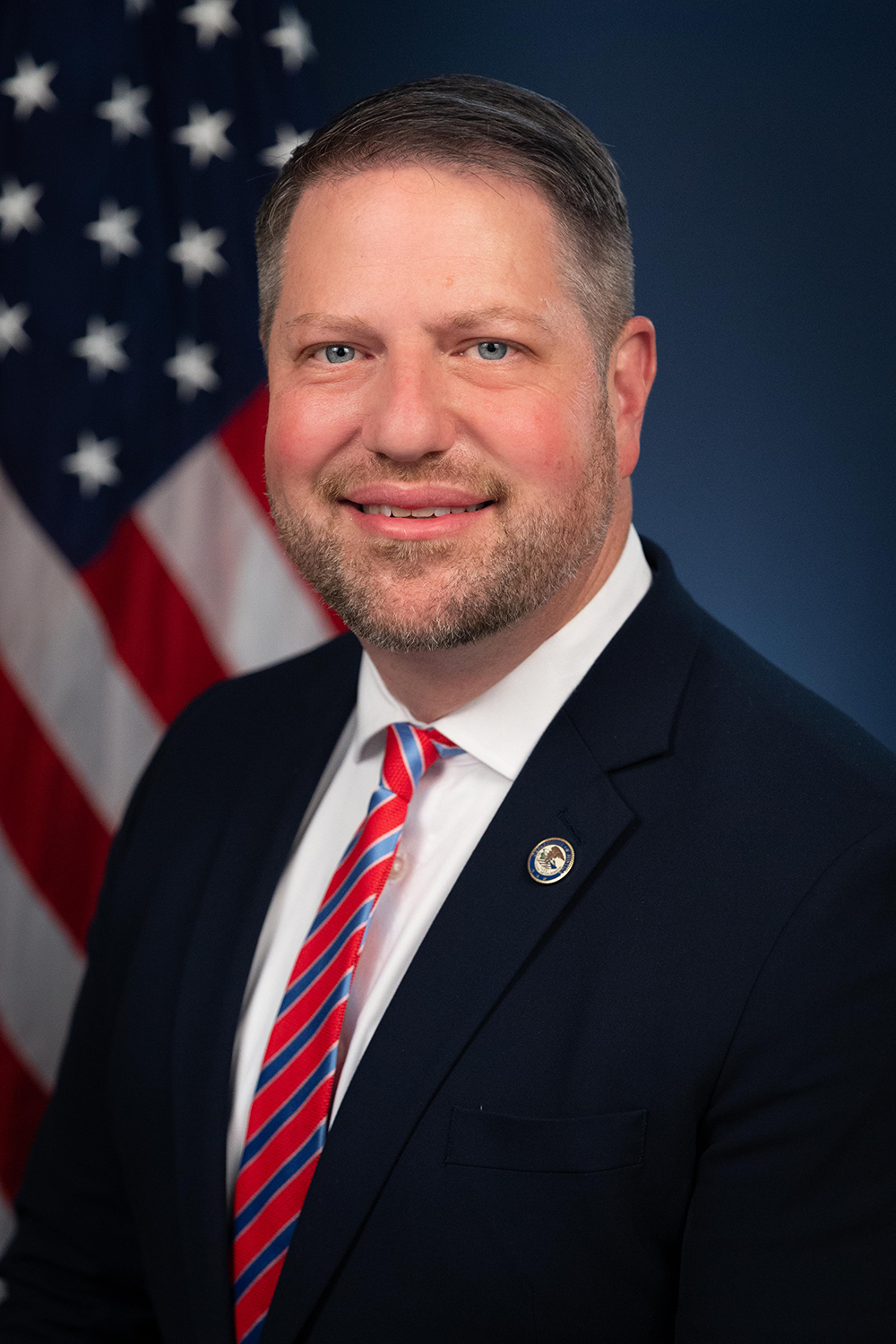
- Incumbent; Jonathan D. Ross since January 1, 2021
- Department of Justice
- Reports to: U.S. Attorney General
- Seat: Little Rock, Arkansas
- Appointer: The president with Senate advice and consent
- Inaugural holder: Joseph Stillwell
- Formation: 1852
- Website: justice.gov/usao-edar

The office of United States attorney for the Eastern District of Arkansas came into being with the creation of the district in 1852, and continues to the present day.

== List ==
#	U.S. Attorney	Years
Arkansas Territory
1	Joshua Norvell	1819–1820
2	William Trimble	1820–1824
3	Samuel C. Roane	1824–1836
District of Arkansas
4	Grandison D. Royston	1836
5	Samuel S. Hall	1837–1838
6	William C. Scott	1839–1841
7	Absalom Fowler	1841–1843
8	Grandison D. Royston	1843–1844
9	Samuel H. Hempstead	1844–1850
10	Absalom Fowler	1850–1851
Eastern District of Arkansas
11	Joseph Stillwell	1852–1853
12	James W. McConaughey	1853–1856
13	Col. Lafayette B. Luckie	1856
14	Read Fletcher (Note: Fletcher nominated on Dec. 8, 1856, after John C. Murray was nominated by President Franklin Pierce on June 9, 1856, confirmed by Senate on June 10, 1856, but declined the appointment and never held the office.)	1856–1857
15	John M. Harrell	1857–1860
16	Charles E. Jordan (Note: Confirmed January 24, 1861, and commissioned July 29, 1861, but removed from office related to the Civil War)	1861
17	Charles P. Redmond (Note: Commissioned by President Lincoln by recess appointment on September 24, 1864; nomination withdrawn on March 2, 1865, and Orville Jennings nominated instead)	1864–1865
18	Orville Jennings	1865–1866
19	Maj. John Wytock	1867–1868
20	William G. Whipple	1869–1871
21	Col. Stephen Ransom Harrington	1871–1876
22	Charles C. Waters	1876–1885
23	Joseph W. House	1886–1889
24	Charles C. Waters	1889–1893
25	Jacob Trieber	1897–1900
26	William G. Whipple	1900–1913
27	William H. Martin	1913–1919
28	June P. Wooten	1919–1922
29	Charles F. Cole	1922–1930
30	Wallace Townsend	1930–1934
31	Fred A. Isrig	1934–1939
32	Samuel Rorex	1939–1946
33	James T. Gooch	1946–1953
34	Osro Cobb	1953–1962
35	Robert D. Smith, Jr	1962–1967
36	Woodrow H. McClellan	1967–1968
37	Wilbur H. Dillahunty	1968–1979
38	George W. Proctor	1979–1987
–	Kenneth H. Stoll (Note: Acting)	1987
40	Charles A. Banks	1987–1993
–	Richard Pence	1993
41	Paula Casey	1993–2001
–	Michael D. Johnson	2001
42	Harry E. "Bud" Cummins II	2001–2006
–	J. Timothy Griffin (Note: Served as interim from December 2006 to June 2007; Appointed but not confirmed by the Senate)	2006–2007
43	Jane W. Duke	2007–2010
44	Christopher R. Thyer	2010–2017
–	Patrick C. Harris	2017
45	J. Cody Hiland	2017–2020
46	Jonathan D. Ross	2021–present
