= Timothy Fox =

Timothy or Tim Fox may refer to:

- Timothy Fox (divine) (1628–1710), Anglican divine
- Timothy Davis Fox (born 1957), Arkansas judge
- Tim Fox (American football) (born 1953), American football player
- Tim Fox (politician) (born 1957), American lawyer, Attorney General of Montana
- Timothy Fox (character), fictional character appearing in comics published by DC Comics
