= Cliff Hoofman =

American judge

Associate Justice of the Arkansas Supreme Court
- In office January 1, 2013 – December 31, 2014
- Appointed by: Mike Beebe
- Preceded by: Robert L. Brown
- Succeeded by: Rhonda K. Wood

Personal details
- Born: June 23, 1943 (age 83) Judsonia, Arkansas, U.S.
- Education: University of Central Arkansas (BS); University of Arkansas School of Law (JD)

Cliff Hoofman (born June 23, 1943 in Judsonia, Arkansas) was a justice of the Arkansas Supreme Court being appointed to the position in 2012 his term ending at the end of 2014. He was reappointed to the Arkansas court of appeals in December 2014 by outgoing governor Mike Beebe.

== Education ==
Hoofman received his Bachelor of Science from the State College of Arkansas, now the University of Central Arkansas, in 1968, and his Juris Doctor from the University of Arkansas School of Law in 1972.

== Legal career ==
Hoofman served eight years in the state Senate and 20 years before that in the state House. He also worked in the attorney general's office during Beebe's tenure as attorney general from 2003 to 2007.

== Service on Arkansas Supreme Court ==
On November 21, 2012, Hoofman was appointed to the Arkansas Supreme Court by Governor Mike Beebe to replace Justice Robert L. Brown.

== Personal life ==
He lives in Enola, Arkansas.
