= 2020 United States presidential election in Arkansas =

- November 3, 2020
- Turnout: 66.92% ▲

| Nominee | Donald Trump | Joe Biden |
| Party | Republican | Democratic |
| Home state | Florida | Delaware |
| Running mate | Mike Pence | Kamala Harris |
| Electoral vote | 6 | 0 |
| Popular vote | 760,647 | 423,932 |
| Percentage | 62.40% | 34.78% |

Trump
40–50%
50–60%
60–70%
70–80%
80–90%
90–100%
Biden
40–50%
50–60%
60–70%
70–80%
80–90%
90–100%
Tie/No Vote
President before election
Donald Trump
Republican
Elected President
Joe Biden
Democratic

The 2020 United States presidential election in Arkansas took place on Tuesday, November 3, 2020, as part of the 2020 United States presidential election in which all 50 states plus the District of Columbia participated. Arkansas voters chose six electors to represent them in the Electoral College via a popular vote pitting incumbent Republican President Donald Trump and his running mate, incumbent Vice President Mike Pence, against Democratic challenger and former Vice President Joe Biden and his running mate, United States Senator Kamala Harris of California. Also on the ballot were the nominees for the Libertarian, Green, Constitution, American Solidarity, Life and Liberty, and Socialism and Liberation parties and Independent candidates. Write-in candidates are not allowed to participate in presidential elections.

Prior to the election, all 14 news organizations making predictions considered this a state Trump would win, or otherwise a safe red state. In 2016, Trump won Arkansas by a 26.92% margin, the largest margin for a candidate of either party since Jimmy Carter's 30.01% margin in 1976. In 2020, Trump won 62.40% of the vote to Biden's 34.78%, a 27.62% margin, the seventh consecutive election in which Republicans improved on their margin in Arkansas, the longest in the nation of any state for either party. This made Arkansas one of only seven states, along with the District of Columbia, in which Trump improved on his performance in 2016. (Note: The other five states were California, Florida, Hawaii, Illinois, Nevada, and Utah.) Despite improving on Hillary Clinton's performance in the Natural State by 1.13% in terms of raw vote percentage, Biden's losing margin makes it the largest loss by a Democrat in Arkansas since George McGovern's 38.1-point defeat in 1972. The last Democrat even to win over 40% of the vote was John Kerry in 2004. After Barack Obama, Biden is the second ever Democrat to win the presidency without carrying Arkansas. This was the first time ever that an incumbent Republican carried the state while losing re–election.

Trump won landslide margins across the state, including in many of the state's metropolitan areas and suburbs. Trump once again carried Woodruff County, formerly a Democratic stronghold, thus marking the first time since its founding that a Democrat was elected president without carrying the county. Biden's strength was mostly isolated to Pulaski County, home to the state capital and largest city of Little Rock, and Jefferson County, home to Pine Bluff. He also won six rural, predominantly African-American counties on the eastern border along the Mississippi River. All but seven counties in the state swung heavily to the right, the exceptions being Pulaski County and one other county in the Little Rock metropolitan area; Sebastian County, home to Fort Smith; and three counties in the northwest encompassing and surrounding the college town of Fayetteville, where the University of Arkansas is located. Notably, Biden lost Washington County, where Fayetteville is, by only 3.9 percentage points, the closest any Democrat has come to winning it since Clinton did so in 1996. Arkansas voted 32.07% more Republican than the national average in 2020.

== Primary elections ==
The primary elections were held on Super Tuesday, March 3, 2020.

=== Republican primary ===
Incumbent President Donald Trump, former Massachusetts Governor Bill Weld, and perennial candidate Rocky De La Fuente were the declared Republicans candidates. Tom Cotton, the current junior senator from Arkansas, declined to run in 2017. As incumbent presidents rarely face prominent challenges in primaries, Trump won all 40 delegates and 97.13% of the vote.

The following candidates are on the ballot.

2020 Arkansas Republican presidential primary
| Candidate | Popular vote | | Delegates |
| Candidate | Count | Percentage | Delegates |
|---|---|---|---|
| Donald Trump | 238,980 | 97.13% | 40 |
| Bill Weld | 5,216 | 2.12% | 0 |
| Rocky De La Fuente | 1,848 | 0.75% | 0 |
| Total | 246,044 | 100% | 40 |

=== Democratic primary ===
Eighteen candidates were on the Democratic primary ballot, of whom nine had already withdrew, three withdrew during the early voting period, and six were active candidates. Former Vice President Joe Biden won the primary with 40.59% of the vote and 17 delegates; he carried all but one county. Senator Bernie Sanders of Vermont came in second place, with 22.44% of the vote and 9 delegates. Former New York City Mayor Michael Bloomberg won 16.72% of the vote and 5 delegates; no other candidates won over 15% of the vote or any delegates. Biden's win was widely predicted in polling and forecasts, similar to most other southern states; his best performance was along the eastern border along the Mississippi River and on the southern border, which have high concentrations of African American voters, who Biden consistently performed better among throughout the primary. He also won the Little Rock, Fort Smith, Jonesboro, and Pine Bluff metropolitan areas. Analogous with his performance in the 2016 primary, Sanders performed best in the northwest, traditionally the most Republican part of the state, holding Biden to less than 40 percent of the vote in many regions and winning Washington County, home to the University of Arkansas in Fayetteville. Biden's strong performance in the state is a vestige of the prominence of moderate, white, Democratic politicians in and from the state throughout the late 20th century and 2000s which has largely faded amid increased political polarization and Republican gains among white, non-college-educated voters. Aided by several other centrist candidates withdrawing from the race just before Super Tuesday and a growing Democratic voter base in the suburbs, Arkansas was a relatively noncompetitive state throughout the primary.

Popular vote share by county Biden—30–40% Biden—40–50% Biden—50–60% Biden—60–70% Sanders—30–40%

2020 Arkansas Democratic presidential primary
| Candidate | Votes | % | Delegates |
|---|---|---|---|
| Joe Biden | 93,012 | 40.59 | 17 |
| Bernie Sanders | 51,413 | 22.44 | 9 |
| Michael Bloomberg | 38,312 | 16.72 | 5 |
| Elizabeth Warren | 22,971 | 10.03 | |
| Pete Buttigieg (withdrawn) (Note: Candidate withdrew after early voting had started.) | 7,649 | 3.34 | |
| Amy Klobuchar (withdrawn) | 7,009 | 3.06 | |
| Tom Steyer (withdrawn) | 2,053 | 0.90 | |
| Tulsi Gabbard | 1,593 | 0.70 | |
| Kamala Harris (withdrawn) | 715 | 0.31 | |
| Andrew Yang (withdrawn) | 715 | 0.31 | |
| Michael Bennet (withdrawn) | 574 | 0.25 | |
| Cory Booker (withdrawn) | 572 | 0.25 | |
| Marianne Williamson (withdrawn) | 501 | 0.22 | |
| Steve Bullock (withdrawn) | 485 | 0.21 | |
| John Delaney (withdrawn) | 443 | 0.19 | |
| Joe Sestak (withdrawn) | 408 | 0.18 | |
| Julian Castro (withdrawn) | 304 | 0.13 | |
| Other candidate | 393 | 0.17 | |
| Total | 229,122 | 100% | 31 |

== General election ==
=== Predictions ===
| Source | Ranking | As of |
|---|---|---|
| The Cook Political Report | Safe R | November 3, 2020 |
| Inside Elections | Safe R | November 3, 2020 |
| Sabato's Crystal Ball | Safe R | November 3, 2020 |
| Politico | Safe R | November 3, 2020 |
| RCP | Likely R | November 3, 2020 |
| Niskanen | Safe R | November 3, 2020 |
| CNN | Safe R | November 3, 2020 |
| The Economist | Safe R | November 3, 2020 |
| CBS News | Likely R | November 3, 2020 |
| 270towin | Safe R | November 3, 2020 |
| ABC News | Safe R | November 3, 2020 |
| NPR | Likely R | November 3, 2020 |
| NBC News | Safe R | November 3, 2020 |
| 538 | Safe R | November 3, 2020 |

=== Polling ===
View source data.

==== Aggregate polls ====
| Source of poll aggregation | Dates administered | Dates updated | Joe Biden Democratic | Donald Trump Republican | Other/ Undecided (Note: Calculated by taking the difference of 100% and all other candidates combined.) | Margin |
|---|---|---|---|---|---|---|
| 270 to Win | October 17–28, 2020 | November 3, 2020 | 35.0% | 60.3% | 4.7% | Trump +25.3 |
| FiveThirtyEight | until November 2, 2020 | November 3, 2020 | 36.2% | 58.9% | 4.9% | Trump +22.8 |
| Average | | | 35.6% | 59.6% | 4.8% | Trump +24.0 |

==== Polls ====
| Poll source | Date(s) administered | Sample size (Note: Key: A – all adults RV – registered voters LV – likely voters V – unclear) | Margin of error | Donald Trump Republican | Joe Biden Democratic | Jo Jorgensen Libertarian | Howie Hawkins Green | Other | Undecided |
|---|---|---|---|---|---|---|---|---|---|
| SurveyMonkey/Axios | Oct 20 – Nov 2, 2020 | 1,309 (LV) | ± 4% | 61% (Note: Overlapping sample with the previous SurveyMonkey/Axios poll, but more information available regarding sample size) | 38% | - | - | – | – |
| SurveyMonkey/Axios | Oct 1–28, 2020 | 2,239 (LV) | – | 60% | 38% | - | - | – | – |
| University of Arkansas | Oct 9–21, 2020 | 591 (LV) | ± 3.9% | 65% | 32% | - | - | 3% | – |
| Hendrix College/Talk Business & Politics | Oct 11–13, 2020 | 647 (LV) | ± 4.9% | 58% | 34% | 2% | 1% | 2% (Note: "Someone else" with 2%) | 4% |
| SurveyMonkey/Axios | Sep 1–30, 2020 | 771 (LV) | – | 62% | 38% | - | - | – | 1% |
| SurveyMonkey/Axios | Aug 1–31, 2020 | 689 (LV) | – | 67% | 32% | - | - | – | 1% |
| SurveyMonkey/Axios | Jul 1–31, 2020 | 747 (LV) | – | 66% | 32% | - | - | – | 2% |
| SurveyMonkey/Axios | Jun 8–30, 2020 | 354 (LV) | – | 59% | 38% | - | - | – | 2% |
| Hendrix College/Talk Business & Politics | Jun 9–10, 2020 | 869 (LV) | ± 3.3% | 47% | 45% | - | - | 5% (Note: "Another candidate" with 5%) | 3% |

=== Fundraising ===
According to the Federal Election Commission, in 2019 and 2020, Donald Trump and his interest groups raised $2,732,436.64, Joe Biden and his interest groups raised $2,088,712.78, and Jo Jorgensen and her interest groups raised $5,289.19 from Arkansas-based contributors.

=== Candidate ballot access ===
The candidates on the ballot were listed in the following order:

- Jo Jorgensen / Spike Cohen, Libertarian
- Kanye West / Michelle Tidball, Independent
- Brock Pierce / Karla Ballard, Independent
- Brian T. Carroll / Amar Patel, American Solidarity
- Howie Hawkins / Angela Nicole Walker, Green
- C. L. Gammon / Phil Collins, (Note: C. L. Gammon was the original presidential nominee of the Prohibition Party, with Phil Collins as his running mate. After Gammon withdrew, Collins was given the party's nomination for president, but appears on the ballot a second time as Gammon and Collins' original candidacy was never removed.) Independent
- Gloria La Riva / Sunil Freeman, Socialism and Liberation
- John Richard Myers / Tiara Lusk, Life and Liberty
- Don Blankenship / William Mohr, Constitution
- Joe Biden / Kamala Harris, Democratic
- Rocky De La Fuente / Darcy G. Richardson, Independent
- Donald Trump / Mike Pence, Republican

Political party candidates were eligible via a primary election or party convention and had to have filed an affidavit of eligibility, political practices pledge, and party certificate with the Arkansas Secretary of State by March 1, 2020, as did independent candidates. Independents also had to file a petition with at least 1,000 signatures of eligible voters from up to 90 days before the petition filing deadline on August 3, 2020. Write-in candidates cannot run in presidential, municipal, or primary elections.

=== Electoral slates ===
Technically the voters of Arkansas cast their ballots for electors, or representatives to the Electoral College, rather than directly for president and vice president. Arkansas is allocated six electors because it has four congressional districts and two senators. All candidates who appear on the ballot must submit a list of six electors who pledge to vote for their candidate and their running mate. Whoever wins the most votes in the state is awarded all six electoral votes. Their chosen electors then vote for president and vice president. Although electors are pledged to their candidate and running mate, they are not obligated to vote for them. An elector who votes for someone other than their candidate is known as a faithless elector. In the state of Arkansas, there are no laws regarding faithless electors, meaning their vote is counted and not penalized.

The electors of each state and the District of Columbia met on December 15, 2020, to cast their votes for president and vice president. All six pledged electors cast their votes for incumbent President Donald Trump and Vice President Mike Pence. The Electoral College itself never meets as one body. Instead, the electors from each state and the District of Columbia met in their respective capitols. The electoral vote was tabulated and certified by Congress in a joint session on January 6, 2021, per the Electoral Count Act.

These electors were nominated by each party in order to vote in the Electoral College should their candidate win the state:

| Donald Trump Mike Pence Republican | Joe Biden Kamala Harris Democratic | Jo Jorgensen Spike Cohen Libertarian | Kanye West Michelle Tidball Independent | Howie Hawkins Angela Nicole Walker Green | Phil Collins Billy Joe Parker Independent | Brock Pierce Karla Ballard Independent | Don Blankenship William Mohr Constitution | Brian T. Carroll Amar Patel American Solidarity |
|---|---|---|---|---|---|---|---|---|
| Ed Bethune; Sharon Brooks; Iverson Jackson; J. D. McGehee; Rod Soubers; Doyle Webb | Connie Castleberry; Nicole Clowney; Frederick Freeman; Megan Godfrey; Philip Hood; Asad Khan | James Hood; Christopher Olson; Morgan Reynolds; Brian Shank; Jake Simpson; Joe Swafford | Addison Blakely; Audrey Buckner; Christopher Blakely; Christopher Donegan; Trista Nicole Donegan; Courtney Johnson | Ryan Giglio; Chad Jones; Lowel Lybarger; Marilyn Rumph; Robin Rumph; Andrew Waldron | None submitted | Joni Bilhartz; Erin Krus; Jeremy Plumlee; Kelly Shadlow; Susan Shadow; Christopher Smiley | Jonathan Baker; Spencer Graham; Mitchell Ingram; Margie Mullins; Trently Mullins; Brian Webb | Angela Clark-Chandler; Everett DePangher; Ashley Evans; Gary Evans; Lee Evans; Adam Wheeless |

| C. L. Gammon Phil Collins Independent | John Richard Myers Tiara Lusk Life and Liberty | Gloria La Riva Sunil Freeman Socialism and Liberation | Rocky De La Fuente Darcy Richardson Independent |
|---|---|---|---|
| None submitted | Jacob Faught; Brenda Hinesly; William Whitfield Hyman; Brian Leach; Zachary Caleb Mulson; Glen Schwarz | Taylor Adams; Karl Brown; Aaron Gibson; Jill Neimeier; Destin Reishus; Achal Thakore | Gevina Jackson; Orlando Jones; Phyllis McCullor; Elisha Patrick; Tiara Peters; Therma L. Propps Jr. |

=== Results ===
2020 United States presidential election in Arkansas
| Party | Candidate | Votes | % | ±% |
|---|---|---|---|---|
| Republican | Donald Trump Mike Pence | 760,647 | 62.40% | +1.83% |
| Democratic | Joe Biden Kamala Harris | 423,932 | 34.78% | +1.13% |
| Libertarian | Jo Jorgensen Spike Cohen | 13,133 | 1.08% | −1.56% |
| Independent | Kanye West Michelle Tidball | 4,099 | 0.34% | N/A |
| Green | Howie Hawkins Angela Walker | 2,980 | 0.24% | −0.60% |
| Independent | Phil Collins Billy Joe Parker | 2,812 | 0.23% | N/A |
| Independent | Brock Pierce Karla Ballard | 2,141 | 0.18% | N/A |
| Constitution | Don Blankenship William Mohr | 2,108 | 0.17% | −0.24% |
| American Solidarity | Brian T. Carroll Amar Patel | 1,713 | 0.14% | N/A |
| Independent | C. L. Gammon Phil Collins | 1,475 | 0.12% | N/A |
| Life and Liberty | John Richard Myers Tiara Lusk | 1,372 | 0.11% | N/A |
| Socialism and Liberation | Gloria La Riva Sunil Freeman | 1,336 | 0.11% | N/A |
| Independent | Rocky De La Fuente Darcy Richardson | 1,321 | 0.11% | N/A |
| Total votes | | 1,219,069 | 100.00% | N/A |

==== By county ====
| County | Donald Trump Republican | | Joe Biden Democratic | | Various candidates Other parties | | Margin | | Total |
| County | # | % | # | % | # | % | # | % | Total |
|---|---|---|---|---|---|---|---|---|---|
| Arkansas | 4,304 | 68.40% | 1,818 | 28.89% | 170 | 2.70% | 2,486 | 39.51% | 6,292 |
| Ashley | 5,548 | 70.00% | 2,125 | 26.81% | 253 | 3.19% | 3,423 | 43.19% | 7,926 |
| Baxter | 15,836 | 75.38% | 4,635 | 22.06% | 536 | 2.55% | 11,201 | 53.32% | 21,007 |
| Benton | 73,965 | 61.68% | 42,249 | 35.23% | 3,698 | 3.08% | 31,716 | 26.45% | 119,912 |
| Boone | 13,652 | 79.77% | 3,064 | 17.90% | 398 | 2.33% | 10,588 | 61.87% | 17,114 |
| Bradley | 2,335 | 63.90% | 1,214 | 33.22% | 105 | 2.87% | 1,121 | 30.68% | 3,654 |
| Calhoun | 1,636 | 74.98% | 479 | 21.95% | 67 | 3.07% | 1,157 | 53.02% | 2,182 |
| Carroll | 7,424 | 62.93% | 4,023 | 34.10% | 350 | 2.97% | 3,401 | 28.83% | 11,797 |
| Chicot | 1,752 | 42.70% | 2,260 | 55.08% | 91 | 2.22% | -508 | -12.38% | 4,103 |
| Clark | 4,616 | 54.99% | 3,438 | 40.95% | 341 | 4.06% | 1,178 | 14.03% | 8,395 |
| Clay | 4,086 | 78.83% | 962 | 18.56% | 135 | 2.60% | 3,124 | 60.27% | 5,183 |
| Cleburne | 10,328 | 81.45% | 1,988 | 15.68% | 364 | 2.87% | 8,340 | 65.77% | 12,680 |
| Cleveland | 2,867 | 79.64% | 651 | 18.08% | 82 | 2.28% | 2,216 | 61.56% | 3,600 |
| Columbia | 5,500 | 63.83% | 2,814 | 32.66% | 302 | 3.51% | 2,686 | 31.17% | 8,616 |
| Conway | 5,694 | 65.56% | 2,615 | 30.11% | 376 | 4.33% | 3,079 | 35.45% | 8,685 |
| Craighead | 25,558 | 66.37% | 11,921 | 30.95% | 1,032 | 2.68% | 13,637 | 35.41% | 38,511 |
| Crawford | 18,607 | 77.24% | 4,959 | 20.58% | 525 | 2.18% | 13,648 | 56.65% | 24,091 |
| Crittenden | 7,333 | 44.80% | 8,514 | 52.02% | 520 | 3.18% | -1,181 | -7.22% | 16,367 |
| Cross | 4,946 | 71.25% | 1,772 | 25.53% | 224 | 3.23% | 3,174 | 45.72% | 6,942 |
| Dallas | 1,573 | 59.38% | 963 | 36.35% | 113 | 4.27% | 610 | 23.03% | 2,649 |
| Desha | 1,921 | 46.13% | 2,016 | 48.41% | 227 | 5.45% | -95 | -2.28% | 4,164 |
| Drew | 4,349 | 62.96% | 2,426 | 35.12% | 133 | 1.93% | 1,923 | 27.84% | 6,908 |
| Faulkner | 34,421 | 63.24% | 18,347 | 33.71% | 1,660 | 3.05% | 16,074 | 29.53% | 54,428 |
| Franklin | 5,677 | 79.63% | 1,300 | 18.24% | 152 | 2.13% | 4,377 | 61.40% | 7,129 |
| Fulton | 3,961 | 77.38% | 1,035 | 20.22% | 123 | 2.40% | 2,926 | 57.16% | 5,119 |
| Garland | 29,069 | 65.77% | 14,045 | 31.78% | 1,085 | 2.45% | 15,024 | 33.99% | 44,199 |
| Grant | 6,794 | 82.85% | 1,268 | 15.46% | 138 | 1.68% | 5,526 | 67.39% | 8,200 |
| Greene | 12,670 | 78.70% | 3,058 | 18.99% | 372 | 2.31% | 9,612 | 59.70% | 16,100 |
| Hempstead | 4,470 | 65.27% | 2,138 | 31.22% | 240 | 3.50% | 2,332 | 34.05% | 6,848 |
| Hot Spring | 9,202 | 73.28% | 3,082 | 24.54% | 273 | 2.17% | 6,120 | 48.74% | 12,557 |
| Howard | 3,367 | 69.65% | 1,340 | 27.72% | 127 | 2.63% | 2,027 | 41.93% | 4,834 |
| Independence | 11,250 | 77.52% | 2,806 | 19.34% | 456 | 3.14% | 8,444 | 58.19% | 14,512 |
| Izard | 4,631 | 79.71% | 1,021 | 17.57% | 158 | 2.72% | 3,610 | 62.13% | 5,810 |
| Jackson | 3,593 | 70.58% | 1,365 | 26.81% | 133 | 2.61% | 2,228 | 43.76% | 5,091 |
| Jefferson | 9,521 | 37.84% | 14,981 | 59.55% | 656 | 2.61% | -5,460 | -21.70% | 25,158 |
| Johnson | 6,938 | 73.05% | 2,283 | 24.04% | 277 | 2.92% | 4,655 | 49.01% | 9,498 |
| Lafayette | 1,757 | 65.58% | 839 | 31.32% | 83 | 3.10% | 918 | 34.27% | 2,679 |
| Lawrence | 4,569 | 78.01% | 1,080 | 18.44% | 208 | 3.55% | 3,489 | 59.57% | 5,857 |
| Lee | 1,286 | 45.15% | 1,423 | 49.96% | 139 | 4.88% | -137 | -4.81% | 2,848 |
| Lincoln | 2,729 | 70.43% | 1,032 | 26.63% | 114 | 2.94% | 1,697 | 43.79% | 3,875 |
| Little River | 3,715 | 71.76% | 1,226 | 23.68% | 236 | 4.56% | 2,489 | 48.08% | 5,177 |
| Logan | 6,441 | 78.31% | 1,544 | 18.77% | 240 | 2.92% | 4,897 | 59.54% | 8,225 |
| Lonoke | 22,884 | 74.63% | 6,686 | 21.81% | 1,092 | 3.56% | 16,198 | 52.83% | 30,662 |
| Madison | 5,658 | 76.97% | 1,563 | 21.26% | 130 | 1.77% | 4,095 | 55.71% | 7,351 |
| Marion | 5,783 | 77.08% | 1,531 | 20.41% | 189 | 2.52% | 4,252 | 56.67% | 7,503 |
| Miller | 11,920 | 72.12% | 4,245 | 25.68% | 364 | 2.20% | 7,675 | 46.43% | 16,529 |
| Mississippi | 7,296 | 59.12% | 4,558 | 36.93% | 488 | 3.95% | 2,738 | 22.18% | 12,342 |
| Monroe | 1,545 | 54.87% | 1,147 | 40.73% | 124 | 4.40% | 398 | 14.13% | 2,816 |
| Montgomery | 3,046 | 78.65% | 731 | 18.87% | 96 | 2.48% | 2,315 | 59.77% | 3,873 |
| Nevada | 2,133 | 63.52% | 1,076 | 32.04% | 149 | 4.44% | 1,057 | 31.48% | 3,358 |
| Newton | 3,192 | 79.84% | 709 | 17.73% | 97 | 2.43% | 2,483 | 62.11% | 3,998 |
| Ouachita | 5,294 | 54.98% | 3,995 | 41.49% | 340 | 3.53% | 1,299 | 13.49% | 9,629 |
| Perry | 3,479 | 75.19% | 1,012 | 21.87% | 136 | 2.94% | 2,467 | 53.32% | 4,627 |
| Phillips | 2,417 | 38.72% | 3,623 | 58.04% | 202 | 3.24% | -1,206 | -19.32% | 6,242 |
| Pike | 3,519 | 82.88% | 644 | 15.17% | 83 | 1.95% | 2,875 | 67.71% | 4,246 |
| Poinsett | 5,918 | 78.69% | 1,424 | 18.93% | 179 | 2.38% | 4,494 | 59.75% | 7,521 |
| Polk | 7,035 | 82.86% | 1,246 | 14.68% | 209 | 2.46% | 5,789 | 68.19% | 8,490 |
| Pope | 18,081 | 74.01% | 5,772 | 23.62% | 579 | 2.37% | 12,309 | 50.38% | 24,432 |
| Prairie | 2,786 | 79.71% | 654 | 18.71% | 55 | 1.57% | 2,132 | 61.00% | 3,495 |
| Pulaski | 63,687 | 37.47% | 101,947 | 59.98% | 4,322 | 2.54% | -38,260 | -22.51% | 169,956 |
| Randolph | 5,355 | 78.61% | 1,215 | 17.84% | 242 | 3.55% | 4,140 | 60.78% | 6,812 |
| Saline | 39,556 | 69.45% | 16,060 | 28.20% | 1,343 | 2.36% | 23,496 | 41.25% | 56,959 |
| Scott | 2,962 | 83.41% | 483 | 13.60% | 106 | 2.99% | 2,479 | 69.81% | 3,551 |
| Searcy | 3,365 | 83.73% | 588 | 14.63% | 66 | 1.64% | 2,777 | 69.10% | 4,019 |
| Sebastian | 31,198 | 66.18% | 14,487 | 30.73% | 1,455 | 3.09% | 16,711 | 35.45% | 47,140 |
| Sevier | 3,884 | 74.66% | 1,116 | 21.45% | 202 | 3.88% | 2,768 | 53.21% | 5,202 |
| Sharp | 5,938 | 78.48% | 1,398 | 18.48% | 230 | 3.04% | 4,540 | 60.01% | 7,566 |
| St. Francis | 3,242 | 45.61% | 3,604 | 50.70% | 262 | 3.69% | -362 | -5.09% | 7,108 |
| Stone | 4,616 | 77.74% | 1,180 | 19.87% | 142 | 2.39% | 3,436 | 57.86% | 5,938 |
| Union | 10,478 | 63.09% | 5,584 | 33.62% | 545 | 3.28% | 4,894 | 29.47% | 16,607 |
| Van Buren | 6,034 | 77.29% | 1,593 | 20.40% | 180 | 2.31% | 4,441 | 56.88% | 7,807 |
| Washington | 47,504 | 50.39% | 43,824 | 46.49% | 2,938 | 3.12% | 3,680 | 3.90% | 94,266 |
| White | 24,182 | 78.30% | 5,978 | 19.36% | 725 | 2.35% | 18,204 | 58.94% | 30,885 |
| Woodruff | 1,543 | 62.32% | 856 | 34.57% | 77 | 3.11% | 687 | 27.75% | 2,476 |
| Yell | 5,226 | 77.53% | 1,284 | 19.05% | 231 | 3.43% | 3,942 | 58.48% | 6,741 |
| Totals | 760,647 | 62.40% | 423,932 | 34.78% | 34,490 | 2.83% | 336,715 | 27.62% | 1,219,069 |

==== By congressional district ====
Trump won all four congressional districts.

| District | Trump | Biden | Representative |
|---|---|---|---|
| 1st | 69% | 28% | Rick Crawford |
| 2nd | 53% | 44% | French Hill |
| 3rd | 62% | 35% | Steve Womack |
| 4th | 68% | 30% | Bruce Westerman |

== Analysis ==
Arkansas is a majority-White, heavily-rural Southern state with a strong distaste for social liberalism, contained entirely within the Bible Belt. As a result, no Democrat has won Arkansas since native son and former governor Bill Clinton did so in 1996; since then, the Republican margin of victory has increased in every consecutive presidential election. The state thoroughly ceased to be competitive in 2008, when Democrat Barack Obama lost Arkansas by nearly 20 points despite decisively winning the national election. This marked a historic shift in the state; Obama became the first Democrat ever elected president without carrying Arkansas. Analysts at The New York Times speculated that the shift in 2020 occurred because Hillary Clinton, as the former First Lady of Arkansas, had a home state advantage in 2016.

Continuing on this trend, Trump carried Arkansas again by a margin of 27.62%, a 0.7% increase from 26.92% four years earlier in 2016. Even as most of the nation swung slightly leftward, many counties in Arkansas still swung dramatically rightward. Trump improved his margin in the historically Democratic Delta county of Woodruff from 8.9% four years prior to 27.7% in 2020. Biden also became the first Democrat to ever win the White House without carrying this county since its founding in 1862.

Per exit polls by the Associated Press, Trump's strength in Arkansas came from 86% with White, born again/evangelical Christians. Fifty-two percent of voters opposed changing the Arkansas state flag to remove the star that symbolizes the Confederacy, and these voters backed Trump by 88%–10%.

In other elections, incumbent Republican Tom Cotton defeated Libertarian Ricky Dale Harrington Jr. in the senatorial election by 33 points, outperforming Trump. Harrington's performance is the best Libertarian senatorial performance in history in terms of voting percentage. No Democrat filed in the senatorial race.

== See also ==
- United States presidential elections in Arkansas
- 2020 Arkansas elections
- 2020 United States presidential election
- 2020 Democratic Party presidential primaries
- 2020 Republican Party presidential primaries
- 2020 United States elections
