= Josephine L. Hart =

American judge

Associate Justice of the Arkansas Supreme Court
- In office January 1, 2013 – December 31, 2020
- Preceded by: James H. Gunter, Jr.
- Succeeded by: Barbara Womack Webb

Judge of the Arkansas Court of Appeals
- In office 1999 – December 31, 2012

Personal details
- Born: November 20, 1943 (age 82) Perryville, Arkansas, U.S.
- Spouse: Brook Hart
- Education: Arkansas Polytechnic College (BA); University of Arkansas School of Law (JD)

Military service
- Branch/service: United States Army; United States Army Reserve
- Years of service: 1965-1969 (active duty); 1969-1998 (reserve)
- Rank: Colonel
- Unit: Army Judge Advocate General Corps
- Battles/wars: Vietnam War

Josephine Linker Hart (born November 20, 1943, in Perryville, Arkansas) is an American lawyer and jurist who was an associate justice of the Arkansas Supreme Court from 2012 to 2020.

== Early life ==
Hart was born in her grandmother's home in Perryville. At a few days old her family relocated to her father's farm in Russellville. Hart decided at a young age to follow a career in law. A personal family matter is what spurred her to this decision. Hart's family lived off of the farm until her family's fertile farmland was proposed to be taken by eminent domain to build Lake Dardanelle. In 1965 Hart received her Bachelor of Arts degree from Arkansas Tech University.

== Career ==
=== Military service ===
After graduating from college, Hart joined the United States Army and was deployed to Army Headquarters in Japan in 1966. She then was sent to Vietnam at the height of the Vietnam War. Hart was made an administrative chief of a unit comprising 500 people. Hart sorted all correspondence that went through the area, including the leaflets that were dropped over Vietnam. In Vietnam she was promoted to the position of Captain, and for a majority of Hart's time in Vietnam she was the only officer that was female. Hart is quoted as saying about her time in Vietnam, “I was a junior captain in a senior major’s spot, and it had never been filled by a woman before,” but I never had any problems with it. It was a seven-days-a-week, 24-hours-a-day operation, and you just did your job.” In 1969, Hart transitioned from her position in Vietnam to the Army Reserve, by this time she was Colonel and had served for 20 years.

=== Legal practice ===
After arriving back in Arkansas she went to the University of Arkansas Law School of which she was one of only three women. Hart was the only one to actually practice law, with one female classmate dropping out and the other choosing not to practice law. After graduating from the University of Arkansas Law School, Hart was offered a position as a Law Clerk for Arkansas Supreme Court Justice Frank Holt, which she accepted. Generally, law clerk positions are for only one year, but due to Hart's hard work and skill at the job, she was asked to stay on for an additional two years, which she did. After her work as a law clerk she decided to return to Batesville. She is quoted as saying, "I wanted to be of service to the people." Hart entered into private law and represented individuals and families whose land was being condemned or taken away.

=== Judicial career ===
After working in private law for 20 years Hart decided to enter the realm of politics and run for the Arkansas Court of Appeals. Hart ran because the man running for the position, she realized, had never even tried a case in the area. At first, she attempted to find candidates to run against him, but eventually, she took the task upon herself. Though the election covered 19 counties, Hart benefited from having litigated cases in most of the counties and thus held wide name recognition in the area. Hart found adjusting to the job hard at first but eventually saw the benefits of being able to shape the law, instead of arguing the law. In 2002 Hart ran unopposed and began to serve an eight-year term. She ran and won again in 2010. Shortly after winning the 2010 election, Hart did not see herself running again due to personal and family issues, including her mother's health and having to take care of her. After her mother passed, Hart and family began considering a run for the Arkansas Supreme Court. Hart, after encouragement from family and friends, decided to run and get on the ballot through petition. She received over 16,000 signatures between December 2012 and January 2013. Hart went on to win the position in a nonpartisan election with 65.39 percent of the vote. She served until her term expired in 2020. Throughout her career Hart faced, at times, being the only woman in the room. In response to the possibility of having faced discrimination because of her gender she states, "I don't think I ever had a problem being discriminated against ... what I found out was that if you did your work and you did it well, most people are glad to see you." She was one of four women serving on the Arkansas Supreme Court along with Associate Justices Courtney Hudson Goodson, Karen R. Baker, and Rhonda K. Wood.

== Judicial controversies ==
In 2018, the Arkansas Judicial Discipline and Disciplinary Commission (AJDDC) filed an ethical misconduct complaint against the Arkansas Supreme Court, including Josephine Hart. The charges were brought up after a complaint was filed by Wendell Griffen, a Pulaski county judge, in 2017. Griffen alleges that the Arkansas Supreme Court did not give him ample enough time to respond to a ruling that stripped away his ability to decide capital punishment cases. Griffen had filed an injunction in April 2017 that stopped the deaths of seven death row inmates. Arkansas Attorney General Leslie Rutledge appealed to the Arkansas Supreme Court to reverse the decision, and remove Griffen from the case. The clerks notified Griffen and gave him two days to respond, which he did not do. The AJDDC claims this was not enough time. The case is still in litigation.

== Publications ==
Josephine Linker, Casenote, Taxation—Capital Gains—Exchange of “Like Kind” Property, 24 Ark. L. Rev. 142 (1970).

Judge Josephine Linker Hart & Guilford M. Dudley, Available Post-Trial Relief After a State Criminal Conviction When Newly Discovered Evidence Establishes “Actual Innocence,” 22 U. Ark. Little Rock L. Rev. 629 (2000).

Judge Josephine Linker Hart & Guilford M. Dudley, The Unpublished Rules of the Arkansas Court of Appeals: The Internal Rules and Procedures of the Arkansas Court of Appeals, 33 U. Ark. Little Rock L. Rev. 109 (2011).
