= Donald L. Corbin =

American judge (1938–2016)

Justice of the Arkansas Supreme Court
- In office 2005–2014

Member of the Arkansas Court of Appeals
- In office 1991–2001

Member of the Arkansas House of Representatives
- In office 1971–1981

Personal details
- Born: Donald Louis Corbin; March 28, 1938 Hot Springs, Arkansas, U.S.
- Died: December 12, 2016 (aged 78)
- Cause of death: Lung cancer
- Party: Democratic
- Education: University of Arkansas
- Profession: Politician, judge

Military service
- Allegiance: United States
- Branch/service: United States Marine Corps
- Years of service: 1959

Donald Louis Corbin (March 29, 1938 – December 12, 2016) was an American judge and politician.

Born in Hot Springs, Arkansas, Corbin moved to San Diego, California with his parents when his father joined the United States Navy. They then moved back to Arkansas and settled in Lewisville, Arkansas and then Texarkana, Arkansas. Corbin served in the United States Marine Corps in 1959. He then received his bachelor's and law degrees from University of Arkansas. He practiced law in Lewisville, Arkansas. From 1971 to 1981, Corbin served in the Arkansas House of Representatives and was a Democrat. He then served in the Arkansas Court of Appeals from 1991 to 2001. Corbin then served as a justice of the Arkansas Supreme Court and was appointed to the position in 2005. He retired at the end of his term in 2014 after suffering a heart attack in 2010 and having a cancerous tumor removed from one of his lungs in 2011. He died on December 12, 2016, from lung cancer.
