= Ronald Lee Sheffield =

American judge (born 1946)

- Born: June 30, 1946; Coshocton, Ohio, U.S.
- Education: University of Arkansas at Little Rock (J.D.)
- Occupations: Attorney, Judge
- Known for: Justice of the Arkansas Supreme Court
- Title: Associate Justice of the Arkansas Supreme Court
- Spouse: Mildred Sheffield
- Children: 2
- Military career
- Branch: U.S. Air Force
- Unit: 825th Strategic Aerospace Division

Ronald Lee Sheffield (born June 30, 1946) is an American attorney and former associate justice of the Arkansas Supreme Court. Appointed in January 2010 by Governor Mike Beebe, Sheffield served a one-year term following the retirement of Justice Annabelle Clinton Imber. He was the sixth African American to serve on the state's highest court.

== Early life ==
While attending high school in Coshocton, Ohio, Sheffield was the only African American on both the football and baseball teams. He started in the football team's backfield during away games but was not permitted to play at home games.

== Career ==
He worked for Arkansas Insurance Department for 27 years, including seven years as Deputy Insurance Commissioner.

Sheffield enlisted in the U.S. Air Force, trained as a photographic technician, and documented the aftermath of a 1965 Titan II missile silo fire, aiding in the investigation.

In 1999, he became Redistricting Director for the Arkansas Secretary of State’s Office. In 2004, he was the Democratic Party nominee for lieutenant governor.

== Judicial appointment ==
In January 2010, Governor Mike Beebe appointed Sheffield to the Arkansas Supreme Court to fill the unexpired term of Justice Annabelle Clinton Imber. Sheffield's appointment was effective immediately and was to end when a justice was elected in a May special election to fill the unexpired term.

== Personal life ==
Sheffield has worked as an adjunct professor at Pulaski Technical College. He is married to his wife, Mildred, and they have two children.

Political offices
Preceded by William H. Bowen	Justice of the Arkansas Supreme Court; 2010–2010	Succeeded by Karen R. Baker
