= Robin F. Wynne =

American judge (1953–2023)

Robin Wynne

Associate Justice of the Arkansas Supreme Court
- In office January 1, 2015 – June 21, 2023
- Preceded by: Donald L. Corbin
- Succeeded by: J. Cody Hiland

Judge of the Arkansas Court of Appeals from the 5th district
- In office January 1, 2011 – December 31, 2014
- Preceded by: Michael Kinard
- Succeeded by: Michael Kinard

Personal details
- Born: Robin French Wynne; February 15, 1953 Warren, Arkansas, U.S.
- Died: June 21, 2023 (aged 70) Little Rock, Arkansas, U.S.
- Party: Democratic
- Spouse: Margo Wynne
- Children: 4
- Education: Harvard University (BA); University of Arkansas (JD); Southern Methodist University

Robin French Wynne (February 15, 1953 – June 21, 2023) was an American judge. He served as a justice on the Arkansas Supreme Court from 2014 until his death. He had previously been a judge on the Arkansas Court of Appeals, District 5 from 2011 until being sworn into the Arkansas Supreme Court in 2015. Prior to serving on the Court of Appeals, he was the Dallas County District Judge between 2004 and 2010.

== Education ==
Wynne received his Bachelor of Arts from Harvard University in 1975 and his Juris Doctor degree from the University of Arkansas School of Law in 1978. He attended the Perkins School of Theology at Southern Methodist University in Dallas, Texas, from 1979 to 1980.

== Elections ==
=== 2010 ===
Wynne ran unopposed and was elected in 2010 to finish a term on the Arkansas Court of Appeals to fill the District 5 seat vacated by Michael Kinard.

=== 2012 ===
Wynne ran unopposed and was re-elected to the District 5 seat on the Arkansas Court of Appeals.

=== 2014 ===
Wynne was elected to an eight-year term on the Arkansas Supreme Court, beating Maumelle, Arkansas attorney Tim Cullen. Wynne won the election by a 52% to 48% margin. Wynne replaced retiring Justice Donald L. Corbin.

=== 2022 ===
Wynne ran for re-election to the Arkansas Supreme Court in the May General election. Wynne was the top vote getter in the three-way race against Chris Carnahan and David Sterling, garnering 49.5% of the vote. A Two-round system run-off election occurred on November 8, 2022, between Wynne and Carnahan, who garnered 28.8% of the general election vote. Wynne won the run-off election with 58.4% of the vote. Wynne's second term on the Arkansas Supreme Court would have ended in 2030, but Wynne died in 2023 before serving it out.

== Career ==
From 1985 to 1988 Wynne represented the 91st district of the Arkansas House of Representatives as a Democrat, comprising parts of Dallas, Cleveland, and Lincoln counties. From 1989 to 1998 Wynne was a deputy prosecuting attorney for the Thirteenth Judicial District of Arkansas, the jurisdiction including Dallas County. Beginning in 1989 Wynne also served as city attorney of Fordyce, Arkansas, the county seat of Dallas County. Wynne also served as the Dallas County, Arkansas, district judge from 2004 to 2010.

== Death ==
Wynne died on June 21, 2023, at the age of 70.

Legal offices
Preceded by Donald L. Corbin	Associate Justice of the Arkansas Supreme Court; 2015–2023	Succeeded by J. Cody Hiland
