= Joseph House =

Joseph House may refer to:

- Joseph House (Columbus, Georgia), listed on the National Register of Historic Places listings in Muscogee County, Georgia
- Joseph Joseph House, Iron River, Michigan, listed on the National Register of Historic Places
- Joseph-Cherrington House, listed on the National Register of Historic Places listings in Columbus, Ohio
- Lyman C. Joseph House, Middletown, Rhode Island, listed on the National Register of Historic Places
- Joseph Warren House, lawyer and state legislator in Arkansas
