= Timothy Davis Fox =

American lawyer

Tim Fox

Pulaski County Circuit Court
- In office January 1, 2002 – January 1, 2020
- Preceded by: David Bogard

Personal details
- Born: Timothy Davis Fox; 1957 (age 68–69) Little Rock, Arkansas
- Education: Hendrix College; University of Arkansas School of Law; National Judicial College

== Biography ==
Timothy Davis Fox is the elected Circuit Judge of the Sixth Division of the Sixth Judicial Circuit of the State of Arkansas. Fox was born and raised in Little Rock, Arkansas. He graduated from Hall High School in 1975 and attended Hendrix College, graduating with a B.A. in Political Science in 1978. He attended law school at the University of Arkansas, receiving a Juris Doctor degree in 1981.

== Supreme Court bid ==
In 2009 Fox ran for the seat on the Arkansas Supreme Court vacated by the retiring Justice Annabelle Clinton Imber Fox lost to Karen R. Baker.

== Education ==
In 2007 Fox became the first judge in Arkansas to be awarded a Master in Judicial Studies and was awarded the Professional Certificate in Judicial Development from the National Judicial College.

== Professional experience ==
Prior to his election to the bench, Judge Fox practiced law for 21 years. The majority of his career he was engaged in private practice, representing individuals and corporations in litigation. Fox served as Chief Assistant City Attorney for the City of North Little Rock, Arkansas, for five years and served as Prosecutor in the North Little Rock District Court.

=== Teaching ===
Fox has served as a member of the Faculty of the National Judicial College and was a Presenter at the 2008 Ben J. Altheimer Symposium at the William H. Bowen School of Law.

=== Publications ===
- Right Back" In Facie Curiae" – A Statistical Analysis of Appellate Affirmance Rates in Court Initiated Attorney-Contempt Proceedings, 38 University of Memphis Law Review 1 (Fall 2007)
- "[Tru/Fals]isms: A Statistical Analysis of Several Arkansas Judicial Bromides", 30 University of Arkansas Little Rock Law Review 771 (Summer 2008).

=== "From Marbury to Cooper" ===
In 2007 Fox wrote and produced a presentation called "From Marbury to Cooper: Judicial Independence and the Rule of Law". The program addressed the role of the Arkansas legal community and its judicial system in the resolution of the 1957 "Little Rock Nine" crisis at Central High School. Since its presentation at the 2007 Arkansas Bar Association Annual Meeting, the multimedia presentation has been performed on over 30 occasions in more than six states.
