= Oscar D. Longstreth =

American football player and coach (1876–1957)

Biographical details
- Born: September 4, 1876; Muscatine, Iowa, U.S.
- Died: April 29, 1957 (aged 80)
- Education: Iowa State Teachers (1898); Iowa (1904); UALR School of Law (LL.B., 1908)

Playing career
- Position: Quarterback

Coaching career (HC unless noted)
- 1904–1907: Little Rock Central HS (AR)
- 1908: Arkansas State Normal

Administrative career (AD unless noted)
- 1911: Arkansas State Normal

Head coaching record
- Overall: 11–11–1 (high school); 3–3 (college)

Oscar Dolson Longstreth (September 4, 1876 – April 29, 1957) was an American football player and coach. He began the storied football program at Little Rock Central High School in (1904) and at Arkansas State Normal School—now known as the University of Central Arkansas—in 1908.

Longstreth was a native of Iowa and was noted to have played quarterback in his collegiate days.
