= Butch Wilkins =

Butch Wilkins may refer to:

- Ray Wilkins (1956–2018), English footballer and television pundit, nicknamed Butch
- Butch Wilkins (politician) (1946–2022), American politician
