= Butch Wilkins (politician) =

American politician (1946–2022)

Member of the Arkansas House of Representatives from the 59th district
- In office January 14, 2013 – January 2015
- Preceded by: Josh Johnston
- Succeeded by: Jack Ladyman

Member of the Arkansas House of Representatives from the 74th district
- In office January 2009 – January 14, 2013
- Preceded by: Chris Thyer
- Succeeded by: Jon Eubanks

Personal details
- Born: Boyce Logan Wilkins; August 14, 1946 Batesville, Arkansas, US
- Died: August 6, 2022 (aged 75) Bono, Arkansas, US
- Party: Democratic

Boyce Logan Wilkins (August 14, 1946 – August 6, 2022), better known as Butch Wilkins, was an American politician and a Democratic member of the Arkansas House of Representatives representing District 59 from 2013 to 2015. Wilkins also served from January 2009 until January 2013 in the District 74 House seat. He was also an officer with the Arkansas Game and Fish Commission. Wilkins was born on August 14, 1946. He died from surgical complications on August 6, 2022, at the age of 75.

== Elections ==
- 2012 Redistricted to District 59, and with Representative Josh Johnston leaving the Legislature, Wilkins was unopposed for the May 22, 2012 Democratic Primary and won the November 6, 2012 General election with 4,390 votes (53.7%) against Republican nominee John Cooper, who in 2014 won a special election to the Arkansas State Senate in District 21 to succeed Democrat Paul Bookout, who was forced from office in scandal.
- 2008 Initially in District 74, when Representative Chris Thyer left the Legislature and left the seat open, Wilkins won the May 20, 2008 Democratic Primary with 1,104 votes (61.6%) over Mall operator Jason Whitley, and was unopposed for the November 4, 2008 General election.
- 2010 Wilkins was unopposed for both the May 18, 2010 Democratic Primary and the November 2, 2010 General election.

Preceded by Josh Johnston	Arkansas State Representative for District 59 (Craighead County); 2013–2015	Succeeded by Jack Ladyman
Preceded by Chris Thyer	Arkansas State Representative for District 74 (Craighead County); 2009–2013	Succeeded by Jon Eubanks
