= Nicholas Bronni =

American lawyer

Nick Bronni

Associate Justice of the Arkansas Supreme Court Position 6
- Incumbent
- Assumed office January 1, 2025
- Appointed by: Sarah Huckabee Sanders
- Preceded by: Karen R. Baker

Personal details
- Born: Nicholas Jacob Bronni; July 10, 1982 (age 44) Camden, Arkansas, U.S.
- Party: Republican
- Spouse: Sarah Tumlin
- Children: 2
- Education: George Washington University (BA); University of Michigan (JD)

Nicholas Jacob Bronni (born 1982 or 1983) is an American lawyer and Associate Justice of the Arkansas Supreme Court. He formerly served as Solicitor General of Arkansas.

== Biography ==
Bronni grew up in Ouachita County, where his father Gary worked in the defense industry in Camden and his mother Carol (nee' Barnes) taught school in Calhoun County. He is the oldest of two sons. Bronni received a Bachelor of Arts, summa cum laude, from George Washington University, and a Juris Doctor, magna cum laude, from the University of Michigan Law School. After law school, Bronni served as a law clerk to Judge Jay Bybee of the United States Court of Appeals for the Ninth Circuit. He then became an associate at Gibson, Dunn & Crutcher, practicing in the firm's appellate and Supreme Court practice. Bronni later served as Senior Litigation Counsel with the U.S. Securities and Exchange Commission in the Appellate Litigation Group. In April 2016, Bronni became deputy solicitor general of Arkansas, and was promoted to solicitor general in July 2018. He is an adjunct professor at the William H. Bowen School of Law. In December 2024, he was appointed to the Arkansas Supreme Court by Governor Sarah Huckabee Sanders.

Legal offices
| Preceded by Karen R. Baker | Associate Justice of the Arkansas Supreme Court; 2025–present | Incumbent |
