= Vic Fleming =

American judge

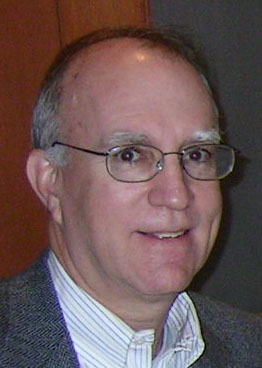
- Vic Fleming (photo by Lloyd Mazer)
- Born: December 26, 1951 (age 74); Jackson, Mississippi
- Education: Davidson College; UALR School of Law
- Occupations: Judge, teacher and author

Victor Anson "Vic" Fleming (born December 26, 1951) is an American judge, law professor, and writer residing in Little Rock, Arkansas.

He was born in Jackson, Mississippi, and grew up in Greenville, Mississippi. He holds a B.A. in English from Davidson College and a J.D. from the University of Arkansas at Little Rock School of Law. He has taught at Bowen as an adjunct faculty member since 2003. He was elected as a district judge for the City of Little Rock in 1996, and reelected in 2000, 2004, 2008, 2012, and 2016 without opposition. The position is now officially known as State District Court Judge, Little Rock, Division 2.

Fleming has written two books of legal humor, including Real Lawyers Do Change Their Briefs; edited five other books, including three volumes of crossword puzzles; and published a collection of crossword puzzles entitled I Swear.

His crossword puzzles have appeared in the New York Times and many other newspapers; several magazines, including Games Magazine, The Rotarian, and The American Lawyer; and several books, including the Simon & Schuster Mega Crossword series and Random House Casual Crosswords; and in other venues. He appeared in the 2006 documentary Wordplay, which also featured a song that he wrote. The New York Times crossword puzzle published on Friday, May 12, 2017, was collaboratively constructed by Fleming and former president Bill Clinton.
