= Rhonda K. Wood =

American judge (born 1969)

Rhonda Wood

Associate Justice of the Arkansas Supreme Court
- Incumbent
- Assumed office January 1, 2015
- Preceded by: Cliff Hoofman

Personal details
- Born: 1969 (age 56–57) Iowa, U.S.
- Education: Hendrix College (BA); University of Arkansas, Little Rock (JD)

Rhonda K. Wood (born 1969) is an American lawyer who has served as an associate justice of the Arkansas Supreme Court since 2015. She previously served as a judge on the Arkansas Court of Appeals from 2013 to 2014, and as a trial court judge for the Arkansas 20th Judicial Circuit from 2007 to 2012.

== Early life and education ==
Wood was born in Iowa in 1969. She moved to Arkansas in 1994 to study at Hendrix College in Conway, where she completed a Bachelor of Arts degree with a major in political science in 1996. She completed a Juris Doctor at the University of Arkansas at Little Rock William H. Bowen School of Law in 1999.

== Career ==
After graduating, Wood started her own law practice in Conway, which was eventually bought out by another law firm, Williams & Anderson of Little Rock. She specialized in appellate law, health law, and business law. Wood also worked as an assistant dean at the Bowen School of Law at UALR from 2002 to 2006.

Since September 2022, Wood has co-hosted the podcast Lady Justice: Women of the Court with former Chief Justice Bridget Mary McCormack of Michigan and Chief Justice Beth Walker of West Virginia to discuss state courts, the law and its real-world implications.

=== Judicial service ===
In 2006, Governor Mike Huckabee appointed Wood as a trial court judge, serving on the Arkansas 20th Judicial Circuit Court, which covers three counties: Faulkner, Searcy, and Van Buren. She was re-elected to a six-year term on this court in 2008.

In 2010, Wood challenged incumbent Josephine L. Hart for a seat on the Arkansas Court of Appeals for district 2. Wood was defeated, receiving 48% of the vote, compared to 52% for Hart. In 2012, Wood ran again for a seat on the Arkansas Court of Appeals, and this time she won, defeating Mitch Cash and winning 63% of the vote.

In 2014, Wood ran for a seat on the Arkansas Supreme Court for position 7, and was elected unopposed. She was reelected again without opposition in November 2022.

In 2024, she unsuccessfully ran for chief justice against fellow justice Karen R. Baker.
