= Chris Thyer =

American politician

Christopher R. Thyer
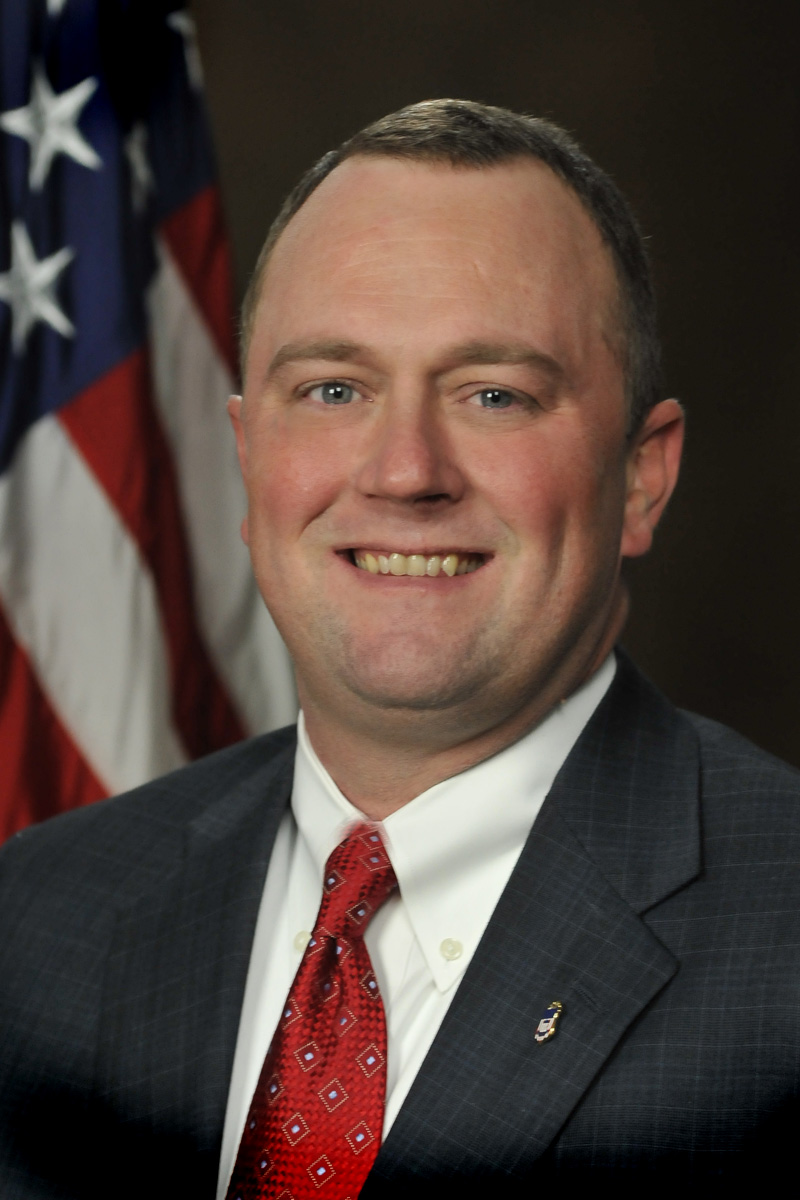

United States Attorney for the Eastern District of Arkansas
- In office 2010 – March 10, 2017
- President: Barack Obama; Donald Trump
- Preceded by: Jane W. Duke
- Succeeded by: J. Cody Hiland

Member of the Arkansas House of Representatives from the 35th district
- In office 2003–2009
- Preceded by: Jerry Allison
- Succeeded by: Butch Wilkins

Personal details
- Born: Christopher Robert Thyer; December 5, 1969 (age 56) Kansas City, Missouri, U.S.
- Party: Democratic
- Spouse: Cindy Thyer
- Education: Arkansas State University (BA); University of Arkansas (JD)

Christopher Robert Thyer (born December 5, 1969) is an American lawyer and politician from Arkansas. He is a former United States Attorney for the Eastern District of Arkansas and a former member of the Arkansas House of Representatives. He is a member of the Democratic Party.

== Education ==
Thyer graduated from Arkansas State University in 1991 with a bachelor's degree in Accounting. Thyer earned his J.D. degree from the University of Arkansas in 1995.

== Career ==
From 1995 to 1997 he was a solo practitioner for the Moody Law Firm in Jonesboro, Arkansas and was later a partner with the firm from 1997 to 2005. From 2005 to 2007 he was a partner with Halsey & Thyer, PLC.

Thyer served in the Arkansas House of Representatives from 2003 to 2009. From 2007 to 2010 he was a partner with the law firm Stanley & Thyer, P.A.

Thyer was nominated by President Obama to serve as the United States Attorney for the Eastern District of Arkansas in 2010. He was later confirmed by the Senate and served until his resignation on March 10, 2017.

== Personal life ==
Thyer is married to Cindy Thyer, a judge on the Arkansas Court of Appeals and a former Greene County Circuit Court Judge.

== See also ==
- 2017 dismissal of U.S. attorneys
