= Robert L. Brown (Arkansas judge) =

American judge

Robert Laidlaw Brown (born June 30, 1941) served as an associate justice of the Arkansas Supreme Court.

== Biography ==
Brown was born in Houston, Texas on June 30, 1941, received a B.A. in 1963 from the University of the South (Sewanee), magna cum laude, where he was elected to Phi Beta Kappa. After receiving a Woodrow Wilson Fellowship, Justice Brown earned his M.A. with honors in English and Comparative Literature in 1965 from Columbia University, and a J.D. in 1968 from the University of Virginia. He was admitted to the Arkansas Bar Association in 1968. Before serving on the court, he was engaged in the general practice of law. He also was a deputy prosecuting attorney for the Sixth Judicial District in 1971 and 1972, worked in Washington, D.C. as the administrative assistant for Congressman Jim Guy Tucker in 1977 and 1978. He was a legal aide to then-Governor Dale Bumpers from 1972 to 1974, and served as a legislative assistant for him from 1975–77, after Bumpers's election as United States Senator. Brown served as Associate Justice of the Arkansas Supreme Court from 1991 through 2012. Currently, Brown is of counsel to the Little Rock, Arkansas, law firm of Friday, Eldredge & Clark, LLP.

Brown is an Episcopalian and attends St. Margaret's Episcopal Church where he has served on the Vestry and as Senior Warden. He has also been an elected delegate to three national conventions. He is married to Charlotte Banks Brown.

== Significant opinions ==
While at the Arkansas Supreme Court, Brown wrote 1,220 majority opinions. Among his most significant opinions are those striking down term limits for United States Senators and Representatives, U.S. Term Limits, Inc. v. Hill, 316 Ark. 251, 872 S.W.2d 349 (1994), which was affirmed by the United States Supreme Court in 1995, and his 2002 opinion holding public school funding for the State of Arkansas unconstitutional, Lake View Sch. Dist. No. 25 v. Huckabee, 351 Ark. 31, 91 S.W.3d 472 (2002), and the subsequent cases enforcing the decision. In 2011, Justice Brown authored the decision in Arkansas Dept. of Human Services v. Cole, 2011 Ark. 145, 380 S.W.3d 429, which declared that the Arkansas Adoption and Foster Care Act of 2008 placed an unconstitutional burden on the fundamental right of privacy found in the Arkansas Constitution.

=== Other opinions ===
- Gatzke v. Weiss, 375 Ark. 207, 289 S.W.3d 455 (2008) (holding that article 19, section 16 of the Arkansas Constitution applies only to county-funded contracts, and statutes permitting certain state-funded contracts to be funded without competitive bidding were not unconstitutional).
- Griffen v. Arkansas Judicial Discipline and Disability Commission, 355 Ark. 38, 130 S.W.3d 524 (2003) (holding that judicial conduct canon prohibiting judge from appearing at public hearing before legislative body or official except on matters concerning law, legal system, or administration of justice, except when acting pro se in a matter involving judge or judge's interests was unconstitutionally vague, and canon violated first amendment rights of judge).
- Linder v. Linder, 348 Ark. 322, 72 S.W.3d 841 (2002) (holding Arkansas's Grandparent Visitation Act unconstitutional as applied).
- ConAgra, Inc. v. Tyson Foods, Inc., 342 Ark. 672, 30 S.W.3d 725 (2000) (holding that former employer's information regarding pricing, pricing programs, cost of goods sold, profit margins, and marketing strategies was not a "trade secret" where former employer had failed to restrict dissemination of pricing information by its customers and failed to have in place any protection against postemployment revelation of confidential information).
- Arkansas Democrat-Gazette v. Zimmerman, 341 Ark. 771, 20 S.W.3d 301 (2000) (holding gag order prohibiting media from photographing juveniles and their families in public places around courthouse constituted a prior restraint on the media).
- Jackson v. Cadillac Cowboy, Inc., 337 Ark. 24, 986 S.W.2d 410 (1999) (holding evidence of alcohol sale by a licensed vendor to an intoxicated person is evidence of negligence).
- Wal-Mart Stores, Inc. v. American Drugs, Inc., 319 Ark. 214, 891 S.W.2d 30 (1995) (holding store's regular sale of items below cost to bring people into store was not evidence of store's intent to destroy competition).

== Bibliography ==
=== Books and Publications by Robert L. Brown ===
- The Second Crisis in Little Rock: A Report on Desegregation Within the Little Rock Public Schools. Little Rock, Ark.: Winthrop Rockefeller Foundation, June 1988.
- Defining Moments: Historic Decisions by Arkansas Governors from McMath through Huckabee. Fayetteville, Ark.: University of Arkansas Press, October 2010.

=== Legal Scholarship and articles by Robert L. Brown ===
- "Judicial Recusal: It's Time to Take Another Look Post-Caperton," 38 University of Little Rock Law Review 63 (Fall 2015).
- "A Judicial Retrospective: Significant Decisions by the Arkansas Supreme Court from 1991 Through 2011," 34 University of Arkansas at Little Rock Law Review 219 (Winter 2012).
- "The Little Rock School District's Quest for Unitary Status," 30 University of Arkansas at Little Rock Law Review 219 (Winter 2008).
- "Just a Matter of Time? Video Cameras at the United States Supreme Court and the State Supreme Courts," 9 The Journal of Appellate Practice and Process (Spring 2007).
- "From Earl Warren to Wendell Griffen: A Study of Judicial Intimidation and Judicial Self-Restraint," UALR Law Review (2005).
- "Expanded Rights Through State Law: The United States Supreme Court Shows State Courts the Way," The Journal of Appellate Practice and Process (Fall 2002).
- "From Whence Cometh Our State Appellate Judges: Popular Election Versus the Missouri Plan", UALR Law Journal (Winter 1998).

=== Other works by Robert L. Brown ===
- "Toxic Judicial Elections: A Proposed Remedy," Arkansas Lawyer. Winter 2009.
- "The Arkansas Supreme Court: The Job and How It Has Changed," Arkansas Lawyer. Winter 2005.
- "Non-Partisan Elections," Arkansas Lawyer. Winter 1999.
- "How the Public Views Female and Black Attorneys - Introduction," Arkansas Lawyer. Winter 1997.
- "Judges Without Parties," Arkansas Lawyer. Winter 1996.
- "From Lawyerin' to Judgin'," Arkansas Lawyer. July 1992.
- "George Rose Smith," Arkansas Lawyer. January 1987.
- "Making Money or, How Some People Have Gotten Very Rich," Arkansas Lawyer. July 21 - August 3, 1986.
- "Making Money - Four Arkansas Merchant Princes," Arkansas Business. August 18–31, 1986.
- "Making Money - Developing Real Estate and Fortunes - Some Did One to Attain the Other," Arkansas Business. August 4–17, 1986.
- "Four for the Future - Four Young Professionals Hold Promise Of Success For Themselves, Firms," Arkansas Business. April 15–28, 1985.
- "Four for the Future - Where Will The Future Take These Young, Corporate Knights Of The Business Table?," Arkansas Business. December 24 - January 6, 1985.
- "Williams Starr Mitchell, John Thorpe Williams," Arkansas Lawyer. 1985.
- "What If Bumpers Had Run?," Arkansas Gazette. December 30, 1984.
- "Profile: Everett Tucker," Arkansas Business. June 11–24, 1984.
- "Sheffield Nelson from the Bottom to the Top and Still Climbing," Arkansas Times. September 1983.
- "Into the Financial Stratosphere with Federal Express," Arkansas Times. February 1983.
- "The PSC and You - Are Commissioners Umpires or Teamplayers?," Arkansas Times. February 1982.
- "The ACLU in Arkansas: Devil's Tool or Freedom's Champion?," Arkansas Times. December 1982.
- "Frank White: Arkansas' 'Gruff Gus' in the Governor's Seat," Arkansas Times. June 1981.
- "Lobbying the Lawmakers," Arkansas Lawyer. January 1981.
- "Rating Our Men in Washington - Part II," Arkansas Times. January 1981.
- "An Inside Look at Our Men in Washington - The Myths and Realities," Arkansas Times. June 1980.
- "Of Whales and Smaller Fry - A Candid Rating of Our Men in Washington," Arkansas Times. December 1980.
- "Lawyers as Lawmakers," Arkansas Times. April 1979.

== Professional activities and awards ==
During his time as an associate justice, Brown served as the court liaison to the Arkansas Judges and Lawyers Assistance Program, the Criminal Practice Committee, the Civil Practice Committee, and the Board of Law Examiners. From 2002 to 2004, he served on the board of the Arkansas Judicial Council. From 2011 to 2012, he was appointed by the Arkansas Board of Governors and Arkansas Judicial Council as chair of the Task Force to Study Judicial Election Reform. He is a member of the American Bar Foundation and the Arkansas Bar Foundation.

He served on the board of trustees of the University of the South (Sewanee) from 1981 to 1989 and on the board of regents of the University of the South (Sewanee) from 1989 to 1995. He was president of the Overton Inn of Court from 1999 to 2000. He is a member of the board of directors for the Marie Foundation (To Honor Community Service) and serves on the advisory committee for the Winthrop Rockefeller Distinguished Lecture Series and on the selection committee for the Jefferson Scholars nominations for the University of Virginia. He currently serves on the University of Arkansas Medical Systems Foundation Fund Board and is co-chair of the Advocacy Committee. In 2017, Brown was appointed to the Central Arkansas Library System Board of Trustees.

He was the recipient of the Distinguished Alumnus Award from the University of the South (Sewanee) in 2006, the Col. Ransick Award for Excellence in the Profession from the Arkansas Bar Association in 2007, and in 2010 the first Community Support Award from the Arkansas Judges and Lawyers Assistance Program, which was named in his honor. In 2013, he received an honorary Doctor of Civil Laws degree from the University of the South (Sewanee). In 2014, he received the Friend of Children Award from the Arkansas Advocates for Family and Children.
