= Arkansas Constitutional Amendment 80 =

Amendment 80
- November 7, 2000
- Arkansas Constitutional Amendment 80

Results
Choice	Votes	%
Yes	431,137	57.12%
No	323,647	42.88%
Yes
70–80%
60–70%
50–60%
No
60–70%
50–60%

Arkansas Constitutional Amendment 80 (known as Referred Amendment 3 prior to passage) amended the Constitution of Arkansas to comprehensively change the judiciary of Arkansas by essentially replacing Article VII of the Constitution of Arkansas. The amendment was referred by the Arkansas General Assembly (legislative referral) to voters, and was approved during the November 7, 2000 election.

== History ==
The judicial department of Arkansas state government was created by the 1836 Constitution of Arkansas during statehood. The initial constitution created the Arkansas Supreme Court, which had three judges, elected by the Arkansas General Assembly, and vested remaining judicial power in circuit courts (courts of record), in county courts (paternity and estate), and in justices of the peace (inferior courts). Matters of law or equity jurisdiction were both heard by the circuit judge, "sitting either in chancery or equity".

In the 1861 Constitution of Arkansas, corporation courts (municipal court) and probate courts were created, and the General Assembly was allowed to create separate courts of chancery. However, chancery courts were only created piecemeal as needed, with circuit courts retaining dual law/equity jurisdiction until a chancery court was established. This system remained unchanged but was codified by the 1874 Constitution of Arkansas (the current Constitution) in Article VII.

In 1903, Arkansas created a statewide system of chancery courts. A juvenile court system was created in 1911, but found unconstitutional and abolished in 1987 and merged into chancery court. Amendment 58, approved by the voters in 1978, created the Arkansas Court of Appeals to assist with the Supreme Court's appellate caseload.

Several efforts to reform this unwieldy court system had failed to earn voter approval, including the failed proposed Arkansas Constitutions of 1970 and 1980, an amendment that failed to earn legislative referral 1991, and a failed call for a constitutional convention in 1995.

=== Support ===
- Arkansas Bar Association
- Arkansas Judicial Council
- Governor of Arkansas Mike Huckabee
- Lieutenant Governor of Arkansas Winthrop Rockefeller
- President of the Arkansas Senate Mike Beebe
- Rodney E. Slater, research assistant to the State Judiciary Committee of the Arkansas Constitutional Convention in 1979–80, assistant attorney general for the state of Arkansas in 1980, former United States Secretary of Transportation
- Republican Party of Arkansas
- League of Women Voters of Arkansas
- Arkansas Association of Defense Counsel
- Arkansas Prosecuting Attorneys Association

=== Opposition ===
- Arkansas Municipal League
- Arkansas AFL-CIO
- Arkansas Education Association
- Democratic Party of Arkansas
- State Representative Michael Booker, D-Little Rock
- Pulaski County Circuit Judge Marion Humphrey
- City of Bentonville, Arkansas

== Polling ==
=== Polling ===
Poll source	Date(s) administered	Sample size	Margin of error	For	Against	Undecided
Mason-Dixon	October 2000			22%	24%	54%
Mason-Dixon	November 2000	625	4%	31%	26%	43%

== Results ==
Arkansas Referred Amendment 3 (2000)
Choice	Votes	%
For	431,137	57.12
Against	323,647	42.88
Total	754,784	100.00

The amendment:

- merged circuit, chancery, probate and juvenile courts into a single trial court with general jurisdiction (called a circuit court);
- merge municipal, justice of the peace, corporation, police and courts of common pleas into "district court";
- extended term of prosecuting attorneys from two to four years;
- extended term of circuit judges from four to six years;
- required all judicial elections be nonpartisan;
- allowed the Arkansas Supreme Court to issue rules for the administration of the new circuit and district courts.
