= Doyle Webb =

American politician

Chair of the Arkansas Public Service Commission
- Incumbent
- Assumed office January 23, 2023
- Preceded by: Katie Anderson

Chair of the Arkansas Republican Party
- In office December 13, 2008 – December 5, 2020
- Preceded by: Dennis Milligan
- Succeeded by: Jonelle Fulmer

Member of the Arkansas Senate from the 14th district
- In office January 9, 1995 – January 14, 2002
- Succeeded by: Judy Pridgen

Personal details
- Born: December 3, 1955 (age 70) Little Rock, Arkansas, U.S.
- Party: Republican
- Spouse: Barbara Womack
- Education: University of Arkansas, Little Rock (BA, JD)

Doyle Webb (born December 3, 1955) is an American politician who served as the Chair of the Arkansas Republican Party from 2008 to 2020. He currently serves as Chairman of the Arkansas Public Service Commission. During his tenure, Republicans gained control of all of Arkansas' constitutional offices, both chambers of the General Assembly, and both of the state's U.S. Senate seats. He previously served in the Arkansas Senate from the 14th district from 1995 to 2002.

In 2000, Webb was reprimanded for violating Arkansas Model Rules 7.5(d), 5.3(d), 8.4(a) and 1.10(a).

Party political offices
Preceded by Dennis Milligan	Chair of the Arkansas Republican Party; 2008–2020	Succeeded by Jonelle Fulmer
