= Mark Wilcox =

American politician

Commissioner of State Lands of Arkansas
- In office January 14, 2003 – January 11, 2011
- Governor: Mike Huckabee (2003-2007) Mike Beebe (2007-2011)
- Preceded by: Charlie Daniels
- Succeeded by: John Thurston

Personal details
- Party: Democratic

Mark Wilcox is the former Arkansas Commissioner of State Lands. A Democrat, he was first elected in November 2002, taking office in January 2003, and was reelected in November 2006 to a second term.

He previously served as a county official in Faulkner County, having been elected justice of the peace in 1990 and tax collector in 1992.

Party political offices
Preceded by Charlie Daniels	Democratic nominee for Arkansas Commissioner of State Lands; 2002, 2006	Succeeded by L. J. Bryant
