= Timothy Fox (divine) =

English priest (1628–1710)

Timothy Fox (1628–1710), was a nonconformist divine.

== Early life and education ==
Fox was born in 1628, and educated at Birmingham, whence he proceeded to Christ's College, Cambridge.

== Ministry ==
He was admitted by the Commissioners of the Great Seal to the rectory of Drayton, Staffordshire, but upon being ejected by the Act of Uniformity 1662, he settled for a while in a neighbouring town, where he made a shift to live by his pen and the help of relations, till the Oxford Act forced him to remove, and rent a farm in Derbyshire. Afterwards, in May 1684, he was committed to Derby gaol upon that act, not for any exercise of religion, but merely for coming to see his son, then an apprentice in that town, and remained a prisoner until the following November. He again suffered imprisonment when Monmouth was in the west, on this occasion in Chester gaol. No cause was assigned for his detention. After enduring a month's confinement, he was released on finding ample security for his good behaviour. From the time of his ejectment, he preached in private as he had opportunity, and after public liberty was granted, he opened a meeting in his own house at Caldwell, Derbyshire, where he preached twice a day and catechised.

== Death ==
He died in May 1710.
