= J. Cody Hiland =

American judge (born 1972)

Cody Hiland
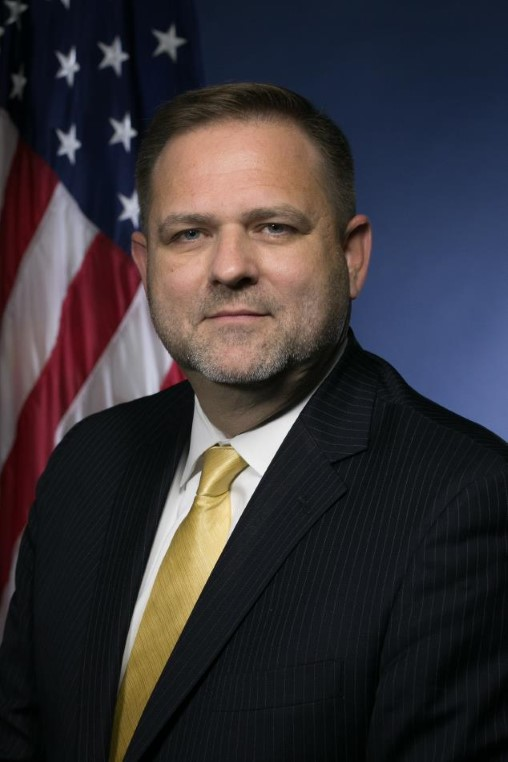
- Official portrait, 2017

Associate Justice of the Arkansas Supreme Court Position 3
- Incumbent
- Assumed office January 1, 2025
- Appointed by: Sarah Huckabee Sanders
- Preceded by: Courtney Rae Hudson

Associate Justice of the Arkansas Supreme Court Position 2
- In office July 3, 2023 – December 31, 2024
- Appointed by: Sarah Huckabee Sanders
- Preceded by: Robin F. Wynne
- Succeeded by: Courtney Rae Hudson

Chair of the Arkansas Republican Party
- In office December 4, 2022 – July 3, 2023
- Preceded by: Jonelle Fulmer
- Succeeded by: Joseph K. Wood

United States Attorney for the Eastern District of Arkansas
- In office October 10, 2017 – December 31, 2020
- President: Donald Trump
- Preceded by: Chris Thyer
- Succeeded by: Jonathan Ross (acting)

Personal details
- Born: James Cody Hiland; 1972 (age 53–54)
- Party: Republican
- Education: University of Central Arkansas (BA); University of Arkansas, Little Rock (JD)

James Cody Hiland (born 1972) is an American lawyer who has served as an associate justice of the Arkansas Supreme Court since 2023. He was appointed to the court by Governor Sarah Huckabee Sanders. He served as the United States attorney for the United States District Court for the Eastern District of Arkansas from 2017 to 2020 after being appointed by President Donald Trump.

== Education ==
He graduated from the University of Central Arkansas in 1993 and from the William H. Bowen School of Law in 1998 with a Juris Doctor.

== Career ==
Hiland was elected to serve as the prosecuting attorney for the 20th Judicial District of Arkansas in 2010 and was re-elected in 2014.

Hiland served as a partner at Hiland, Thomas & Cox, PLLC; a staff attorney and rural and community liaison for the Arkansas Public Service Commission; program director for the Arkansas Transitional Employment Board; and legislative liaison and aide to Mike Huckabee. He was recommended for the position of U.S. Attorney by U.S. Senators John Boozman and Tom Cotton.

=== United States attorney ===
In July 2017, he was nominated by President Donald Trump to become the U.S. attorney for the Eastern District of Arkansas. He was confirmed by the United States Senate on September 28, 2017. He was sworn into office on October 10, 2017. He resigned on December 31, 2020.

=== Arkansas Supreme Court ===
In July 2023, upon the death of Justice Robin F. Wynne, he was appointed to the Arkansas Supreme Court by Governor Sarah Huckabee Sanders.

=== Court of Appeals ===
In November 2026, Trump nominated Hiland to join the U.S. 8th Circuit Court of Appeals.

== See also ==
- List of justices of the Arkansas Supreme Court
- List of United States attorneys for the Eastern District of Arkansas

Legal offices
Preceded by Chris Thyer	United States Attorney for the Eastern District of Arkansas; 2017–2020	Succeeded by Jonathan Ross; Acting
Preceded by Robin F. Wynne	Associate Justice of the Arkansas Supreme Court; 2023–present	Incumbent
Party political offices
Preceded by Jonelle Fulmer	Chair of the Arkansas Republican Party; 2022–2023	Succeeded by John Parke; Acting
