= Annabelle Clinton Imber Tuck =

American judge (born 1950)

Associate Justice of the Arkansas Supreme Court
- In office 1997 – January 1, 2010
- Preceded by: Andree Roaf
- Succeeded by: William H. Bowen (appointed)

Personal details
- Born: Annabelle Davis; July 15, 1950 (age 76) Heber Springs, Arkansas, U.S.
- Spouses: Lee Clinton (m. 1977; div. 1990) Ariel Barak Imber (m. 1990; died 2001) Henry Tuck (m. 2009)
- Education: Smith College; Bates College of Law; University of Arkansas at Little Rock
- Occupation: Lawyer, judge

Annabelle Davis Clinton Imber Tuck (born July 15, 1950) is an American lawyer who served as an associate justice of the Arkansas Supreme Court for thirteen years. The first woman elected to the Arkansas Supreme Court, Imber is best known for a case she handled while she was a chancery judge in the 6th Judicial District (Perry and Pulaski counties).

== Early life and career ==
Tuck was born in Heber Springs, Arkansas and spent early years in Bolivia and Brazil as her father moved for jobs within the International Cooperation Administration. She later moved to the Washington metropolitan area, living with family and attending Prince George's County Public Schools, graduating from Crossland High School. Imber received her undergraduate degree from Smith College in Northampton, Massachusetts and her Juris Doctor degree from the University of Arkansas at Little Rock while working as a paralegal.

Prior to taking the bench, Imber was in private practice for several years with the Little Rock law firm of Wright, Lindsey & Jennings. In 1984, Governor Bill Clinton (no relation to her then-husband) appointed her to a vacant criminal division judgeship on the Pulaski County Circuit Court.

In 1988, she was elected chancery and probate judge for Pulaski and Perry counties.

In 1994, she issued a landmark ruling in the school-funding case filed by the tiny Lake View School District that declared the state was violating the Arkansas Constitution by funding districts inequitably.

== Supreme Court ==
Imber was elected to the Supreme Court in 1997 without opposition, after serving eight years as an elected chancery and probate court judge for Pulaski and Perry counties. She was reelected twice. On September 10, 2009, Imber announced plans to retire from the bench. She retired January 1, 2010.
