= Joseph Warren House =

Arkansas lawyer and politician

Joseph Warren House (12 June 1847 – 10 March 1926) was a lawyer in Little Rock, Arkansas, a state legislator, and a United States District Attorney. He served in the Arkansas Senate.

House was a delegate to the 1874 Arkansas Constitutional Convention. He represented White County in the Arkansas House of Representatives in 1871, as well as Faulkner County in the Arkansas Senate during 1884–1877. He was a lawyer at the firm of Coleman, Robinson, and House.

House moved to Little Rock in 1885; his house at 2125 Arch Street is extant. He married Ina Dowdy of Memphis, Tennessee. His child, J. W. House Jr., married Julia Clarke House; she was a founding member of the Little Rock Garden Club.
