= Barbara Womack Webb =

American judge (born 1956 or 1957)

Barbara Webb

Associate Justice of the Arkansas Supreme Court
- Incumbent
- Assumed office January 1, 2021; On leave: May 12, 2026 – present (Note: Cory Cox serves as special justice during Webb's absence.)
- Preceded by: Josephine L. Hart

Personal details
- Born: 1956 or 1957 (age 68–69)
- Party: Republican
- Spouse: Doyle Webb
- Education: University of Arkansas (BA, JD)

Barbara Womack Webb (born 1956 or 1957) is an American judge from Arkansas who is an associate justice of the Arkansas Supreme Court.

== Education ==
Webb received a Bachelor of Arts from the University of Arkansas in 1979 and a Juris Doctor from the University of Arkansas School of Law in 1982.

== Career ==
Webb was elected to be the prosecuting attorney of the 7th and 22nd judicial districts of Arkansas. In addition to being a prosecuting attorney she has served on the Arkansas Ethics Commission, Arkansas State Crime Lab Board, Arkansas Coalition for Juvenile Justice, and the U.S. Department of Justice Anti-Terrorism Task Force.

She is a chief law judge for the Arkansas Workers Compensation Commission.

=== Judicial service ===
On December 4, 2018, Webb was appointed by Governor Asa Hutchinson to be a circuit judge of Saline County. She was the first woman appointed as a circuit judge in the county. She was appointed to replace Circuit Judge Bobby McCallister and served until December 31, 2018.

On November 8, 2019, Webb filed paperwork to run for a seat on the Arkansas Supreme Court. On March 3, 2020, she was elected to be an associate justice of the Arkansas Supreme Court. defeating Morgan Welch.

Webb went on an extended absence on May 12, 2026 due to surgery and recovery from a head injury sustained in a fall the previous fall. Sarah Huckabee Sanders appointed Cory Cox as an ad hoc special justice on May 12, 2026. Chief Justice Karen R. Baker formally requested a temporary special justice appointment rather than per case on August 10, which Sanders again named Cox to the longer term interim period on August 19. Cox was formally sworn into this role on September 10 until December 31 or Webb's return (whichever is first).

== Personal life ==
She is married to Doyle Webb, a former chair of the Arkansas Republican Party.

Legal offices
Preceded by Josephine L. Hart	Associate Justice of the Arkansas Supreme Court; 2021–present	Incumbent
