= William H. Bowen School of Law =

Public law school in Little Rock, Arkansas

UA Little Rock William H. Bowen School of Law
- Motto: Public Service, Access to Justice, Professionalism
- Parent school: University of Arkansas at Little Rock
- Established: 1975
- School type: Public
- Dean: Colin Crawford
- Location: Little Rock, Arkansas, U.S. 34°44′09″N 92°15′47″W
- Enrollment: 293 (full-time), 101 (part-time)
- Faculty: 87
- USNWR ranking: 139
- Bar pass rate: 83% (2025)
- Website: ualr.edu/law

The UA Little Rock William H. Bowen School of Law is a public law school, part of the University of Arkansas at Little Rock (UA Little Rock). The school is both American Bar Association (ABA) accredited and a member of the Association of American Law Schools (AALS).

The school awards the Juris Doctor (JD) degree in its full-time and part-time programs. It follows a traditional doctrinal curriculum while also blending hands-on practice into the student experience. The first year begins with the Bowen Student Success Program and the Professional Mentor Program where students are matched with a practicing lawyer or judge. Before graduating, students are required to take skills courses such as Evidence and Lawyering Skills I & II, required to participate in an externship or clinic, and are encouraged to participate in the Bowen Concurrent Bar Preparation Program.

== History ==
The first law school established in Arkansas was in Little Rock. However, politics caused the school faculty to reform themselves as a private law school in the 1910s. Subsequently, the state law school in Fayetteville was established. The private law school disbanded in the 1960s. The latest incarnation of the law school started as a part-time program that was an extension of the University of Arkansas at Fayetteville School of Law, and by 1975 was given autonomy and became a unit of the University of Arkansas at Little Rock.

The school resided in various locations, primarily the old Federal Courthouse in downtown Little Rock. The building was adjacent to the Pulaski County Courthouse, which afforded students the chance to see law in action. However, the facility was plagued with poor parking and was insufficient to handle the growing student population.

The law school's current campus is located adjacent to MacArthur Park, near the Arkansas Center for Fine Arts. The historic building was originally built for the medical school of the University of Arkansas for Medical Sciences and was extensively renovated in 1992 for the law school.

The law school is named after William H. Bowen, a former dean, and important figure in the administration of former Arkansas Governor and 42nd President of the United States, Bill Clinton.

== Programs ==
The School offers the following course concentrations:

- Alternative Dispute Resolution
- Business & Commercial
- Civil Practice
- Civil Rights
- Criminal Law
- Elder Law
- Environmental Law
- Family Law
- General Practice
- Government Practice
- Government Regulation
- Health Care
- Intellectual Property
- International Law
- Labor and Employment
- Litigation
- Real Estate
- Skills
- Taxation

== Clinics ==
A law firm inside the law school, the Legal Clinic enables students to work with real clients, the community, and the court system. Below are the Clinics that students can participate in at the UA Little Rock, William H. Bowen School of Law:

- Family Law Litigation Clinic
- Delta Divorce Clinic
- Tax Clinic
- Mediation Clinic
- Business Innovations Clinic
- Veterans Legal Services Clinic

== Admissions ==
- Applications: 603
- Enrolled: 152 (full-time 117, part-time 37)
- Acceptance Rate: 39.2%
- GPA (75/50/25): 3.72/3.47/3.19
- LSAT (75/50/25): 158/154/150
- Bar Passage Rate: 83.0% (2025)

== Campus ==
The law school is located in downtown Little Rock and is the only law school in Arkansas's capital city. It is just minutes from Arkansas's largest law firms, corporations, state and federal courts, and the Arkansas State Capitol building. Other attractions include MacArthur Park, Arkansas Museum of Fine Arts, Clinton School of Public Service, World Services for the Blind, museums, restaurants, bars, breweries, Little Rock River Market District, East Village District, Hillcrest Historic District, and the Clinton Presidential Library.

The school is home to the Pulaski County Law Library, making it the only metropolitan law school library that is also the library for a county.

The law school is housed separately from the main campus of the University of Arkansas at Little Rock, and is located at 1201 McMath Avenue.

== Ranking ==
- Best Value Law School (2011-2018; 2023-2024)
- Best Public Interest Law School (2018; 2023-2024)
- Top Tax Law School (2023-2024)
- Top Law School for Racial Justice (2022-2023)
- Best Law School for Public Service (2016; 2021-2022; 2023-2024)
- Most Innovative Law School (2021 - 2022)
- Top 25 Legal Writing Program (2022)
- Best Practical Training Law School (2016,2019,2020)
- Top Business Law School (2018)
- Top 20 Most Innovative Law Schools
- Most Influential People in Legal Education
- Top 10 Law Schools with the Lowest Alumni Debt (2014; 2016-2017)
- Top 10 Lowest Tuition Rates
- Best Schools for Public Service Careers
- Top 12 Best Legal Writing Programs
- Best Part-Time Programs
- Best Law School for Public Service Careers
- Top 5 Regional Law School for Latina/o Students
- Top 5 Law Schools for Black Students in the Southern Region

== Publications ==
The School of Law publishes three legal journals and a legal guidebook:

- The Journal of Appellate Practice and Process
- UALR Law Review
- Arkansas Journal of Social Change and Public Service
- Legal Guide for Arkansas Nonprofit and Volunteer Organizations

== Costs ==
Full-Time Tuition for residents is $16,041 and non-residents is $31,984. Part-Time Tuition for residents is $10,605 and non-residents is $20.948. The law school offers scholarships up to full tuition. The law school tuition is the lowest in Arkansas and is among the lowest in the nation. Bowen Law is ranked as one of the 10 lowest alumni debt upon graduation by the USNWR, and ranks as the 6th lowest Law School Transparency estimated debt-financed cost of attendance.

== Employment ==
According to Bowen's official 2024 ABA-required disclosures, 93% of the Class of 2024 obtained full-time, long-term, JD-required employment nine months after graduation.

ABA Employment Summary for 2024 Graduates
Employment Status	Graduates
Employed - Bar Passage Required	68%
Employed - J.D. Advantage	11%
Employed - Professional Position	1%
Employed - Non-Professional Position	0%
Employed - Undeterminable	0%
Pursuing Graduate Degree Full Time	6%
Unemployed - Start Date Deferred	2%
Unemployed - Not Seeking	2%
Unemployed - Seeking	5%
Employment Status Unknown	0%
Total of 138 Graduates

== Student organizations ==
The law school has over forty five student organizations. These include the American Bar Association Law Student Division (ABA/LSD), American Constitution Society, Arkansas Association of Women Lawyers-Law Student Division, Arkansas Bar Association Law Student Division (ABA/LSD), Arkansas Trial Lawyers Association, Asian Pacific American Law Student Association (APALSA), Black Law Students Association, Bowen Athletic Department, Bowen Lambda, Christian Legal Society, Delta Theta Phi Legal Fraternity (DTP), Environmental Law Society, Federalist Society, Hispanic Law Students Association (HLSA), Intellectual Property Law Society, International Law Society, Irish American Law Students Society (ILSS), J. Reuben Clark Society, Law Review, Moot Court Board, OutLaw Legal Society, Out of State Student Association (OSSA), Phi Alpha Delta (PAD), Part-time Student Association (PTSA), Pulaski County Bar Association, Student Division (PCBA), Public Interest Law Society (PILS), Sports and Entertainment Law Society (SELS), "Street Law" Mentor Program (Street Law), Student Animal Legal Defense Fund (SALDF), Student Bar Association (SBA), Young Democrats, and Young Republicans.

== Notable faculty ==
=== Current ===
- Vic Fleming, district judge for the City of Little Rock
- Robin F. Wynne, Associate Justice for the Supreme Court of Arkansas

=== Former ===
- Morris S. "Buzz" Arnold, a judge of the United States Court of Appeals for the Eighth Circuit
- Dan Greenberg, former member of the Arkansas House of Representatives
- Paula J. Casey, former U.S. Attorney for the Eastern District of Arkansas

== Notable alumni ==
- Annabelle Clinton Imber Tuck, first female Arkansas Supreme Court Justice
- Rhonda K. Wood Associate Justice on the Arkansas Supreme Court
- Leslie Rutledge, Arkansas Attorney General
- Davy Carter (Class of 2005, born 1975), Speaker of the Arkansas House of Representatives
- Osro Cobb (Class of 1929, 1904–1996), Republican politician, U.S. attorney for the United States District Court for the Eastern District of Arkansas
- Bud Cummins (born 1959), former U.S. Attorney for the Eastern District of Arkansas
- Lynn A. Davis (Class of 1975, 1933–2011), (former U.S. marshal for the Eastern District of Arkansas; crime author
- Vic Fleming (born 1951), district judge for the City of Little Rock
- Michael John Gray (born c. 1976), Democratic member of the Arkansas House of Representatives from Woodruff County since 2015; farmer with a law degree
- Dan Greenberg, former member of the Arkansas House of Representatives
- Douglas House (Class of 1980, born 1953), member of the Arkansas House of Representatives from Pulaski and Faulkner counties
- Dustin McDaniel, Attorney General of Arkansas
- Sheffield Nelson, (born 1940), Arkansas Republican National Committeeman; gubernatorial candidate in 1990 and 1994, chairman of Arkansas Louisiana Gas Company
- Andree Layton Roaf (1941–2009), first African-American woman to serve on the Arkansas Supreme Court
- Vic Snyder (born 1947), former U.S. Representative for Arkansas's 2nd congressional district
- Wallace Townsend (Class of 1906, 1882–1979), Republican national committeeman from Arkansas (1928–1961), Republican gubernatorial nominee in 1916 and 1920, Little Rock lawyer until he was ninety-two
- Mary Wiseman (born 1961), Judge of the Montgomery County (Ohio) Court of Common Pleas
- Michael Lamoureux (born 1976), Member of the Arkansas Senate and Current Senate Pro Tem
- J. Cody Hiland, US Attorney for the Eastern District of Arkansas
