= Arkansas Circuit Courts =

The Arkansas Circuit Courts are the state trial courts of general jurisdiction of the state of Arkansas.

== Composition ==
There are 23 numbered judicial circuits; however, five circuits are split, resulting in 28 judicial circuits. Each has five divisions: criminal, civil, probate, domestic relations, and juvenile. Each circuit covers at least one of Arkansas's 75 counties.

All judges in Arkansas are elected in non-partisan elections. Circuit judges serve six-year terms and must be attorneys licensed to practice law in Arkansas for six years before they assume office.

== List of circuits ==
Judicial Circuit	County(ies)
1st	Cross, Lee, Monroe, Phillips, St. Francis, Woodruff
2nd	Clay, Craighead, Crittenden, Greene, Mississippi, Poinsett
3rd	Jackson, Lawrence, Randolph, Sharp
4th	Madison, Washington
5th	Franklin, Johnson, Pope
6th	Perry, Pulaski
7th	Grant, Hot Spring
8th–North	Hempstead, Nevada
8th–South	Lafayette, Miller
9th–East	Clark
9th–West	Howard, Little River, Pike, Sevier
10th	Ashley, Bradley, Chicot, Desha, Drew
11th–East	Arkansas
11th–West	Jefferson, Lincoln
12th	Sebastian
13th	Calhoun, Cleveland, Columbia, Dallas, Ouachita, Union
14th	Baxter, Boone, Marion, Newton
15th	Conway, Logan, Scott, Yell
16th	Cleburne, Fulton, Independence, Izard, Stone
17th	Prairie, White
18th–East	Garland
18th–West	Montgomery, Polk
19th–East	Carroll
19th–West	Benton
20th	Faulkner, Searcy, Van Buren
21st	Crawford
22nd	Saline
23rd	Lonoke
