= Arkansas Court of Appeals =

Arkansas intermediate appellate court

- Seal of Arkansas
- Interactive map of Arkansas Court of Appeals
- 34°44′44.85″N 92°17′27.51″W
- Established: 1979
- Jurisdiction: Arkansas
- Location: Little Rock, Arkansas, USA
- Coordinates: 34°44′44.85″N 92°17′27.51″W
- Authorised by: Arkansas Constitution
- Appeals to: United States Supreme Court
- Website: Official website

Chief Judge
- Currently: Mark Klappenbach
- Since: January 1, 2025
- Lead position ends: January 1, 2029

The Arkansas Court of Appeals is the intermediate appellate court for the state of Arkansas. It was created in 1978 by Amendment 58 of the Arkansas Constitution, which was implemented by Act 208 of the Arkansas General Assembly in 1979. The court handed down its first opinions for publication on August 8, 1979.

== Jurisdiction ==
The jurisdiction of the Arkansas Court of Appeals is determined by the Arkansas Supreme Court. There is no right of appeal from the Arkansas Court of Appeals to the Arkansas Supreme Court. However, opinions decided by the court may be reviewed by the Arkansas Supreme Court under three circumstances: on application by a party to the appeal, upon certification of the Arkansas Court of Appeals, or if the Arkansas Supreme Court decides the case is one that should have originally been assigned to it.

== Opinions ==
The Arkansas Court of Appeals issues a large number of opinions, but does not publish all of them. Instead, only those opinions that "resolve novel or unusual questions" are released for publication by the state's Reporter of Decisions.

== Judges ==
Originally, there were six judges on the court, this number was expanded by legislation to nine and then twelve. The first judges of the court were appointed by Bill Clinton, during his first term as Governor of Arkansas. The judges are now elected in staggered terms of eight years in a statewide, non-partisan election.

The state of Arkansas is divided into seven districts for the election of judges to the Arkansas Court of Appeals, under Act 1812 of 2003. The qualifications for sitting on the Arkansas Court of Appeals are the same as for the Arkansas Supreme Court.

As of January 15, 2024 the judges currently on the court are:

District	Seat	Name	Start	Law School
1st	1	Raymond Abramson	2014	Arkansas
1st	2	Cindy Thyer	2022	Arkansas
2nd	1	Bart Virden	2014	Arkansas
2nd	2	Mike Murphy	2016	Arkansas
3rd	1	Robert Gladwin	2002	Arkansas
3rd	2	Kenneth Hixson	2022	Arkansas
4th	1	Brandon Harrison	2012	Arkansas
4th	2	Stephanie Potter Barrett	2020	Arkansas
5th	–	Mark Klappenbach, Chief Judge	2016	Arkansas-Little Rock
6th	1	Casey Tucker	2024	Arkansas
6th	2	Wendy Wood	2022	Arkansas-Little Rock
7th	–	Waymond Brown	2008	Arkansas-Little Rock

== See also ==
- Courts of Arkansas
