= Karen R. Baker =

American judge (born 1963)

Karen Baker

Chief Justice of the Arkansas Supreme Court
- Incumbent
- Assumed office January 1, 2025
- Preceded by: John Dan Kemp

Associate Justice of the Arkansas Supreme Court Position 6
- In office January 1, 2011 – December 31, 2024
- Preceded by: Ronald Lee Sheffield
- Succeeded by: Nicholas Bronni

Personal details
- Born: 1963 (age 62–63)
- Education: Arkansas Tech University (BA); University of Arkansas, Little Rock (JD)

Karen Renee Baker (born 1963) is an American lawyer who has served as the chief justice of the Arkansas Supreme Court since 2025. Baker was first elected to the state Supreme Court in 2010.

Baker earned her undergraduate degree from Arkansas Tech University in 1983, and her Juris Doctor from the University of Arkansas at Little Rock Law School in 1987.

Baker was the public defender for Van Buren and Searcy counties from 1989 to 1995. She served as 20th Judicial District Circuit/Chancery/Juvenile Judge from 1995 to 1996, then as 20th Judicial District Circuit/Chancery Judge from 1997 to 2000, then as associate judge for the Arkansas Court of Appeals from 2001 to 2010.

In 2024, she ran for chief justice against fellow justice Rhonda K. Wood.

Legal offices
Preceded by Ronald Lee Sheffield	Associate Justice of the Arkansas Supreme Court; 2011–2025	Succeeded by Nicholas Bronni
Preceded by John Dan Kemp	Chief Justice of the Arkansas Supreme Court; 2025–present	Incumbent
