= Arkansas Supreme Court =

Highest court in the U.S. state of Arkansas

Supreme Court of Arkansas
- Interactive map of Supreme Court of Arkansas
- 34°44′42.6″N 92°17′27.5″W
- Established: January 13, 1836 (190 years ago)
- Jurisdiction: Arkansas
- Location: Little Rock, Arkansas
- Coordinates: 34°44′42.6″N 92°17′27.5″W
- Composition method: Non-partisan election
- Authorised by: Constitution of Arkansas
- Appeals to: Supreme Court of the United States (questions of federal or constitutional law only)
- Judge term length: 8 years
- Number of positions: 7 (by statute)
- Website: arcourts.gov/courts/supreme-court

Chief Justice
- Currently: Karen R. Baker
- Since: January 1, 2025

The Supreme Court of Arkansas is the highest court in the state judiciary of Arkansas. It has ultimate and largely discretionary appellate jurisdiction over all state court cases that involve a point of state law, and original jurisdiction over a narrow range of cases. The Supreme Court holds the power of judicial review, the ability to invalidate a statute for violating a provision of the Arkansas Constitution. It is also able to strike down gubernatorial directives for violating either the Constitution or statutory law. However, it may act only within the context of a case in an area of law over which it has jurisdiction.

The Superior Court of the Arkansas Territory was established in 1819. It consisted of three judges, and then four from 1828. It was the highest court in the territory, and was succeeded by the Supreme Court, established by Article Five of the 1836 Constitution, which was composed of three judges, to include a chief justice, elected to eight-year terms by the General Assembly. As later set by Act 205 of 1925, it consists of the Chief Justice of Arkansas and six associate justices. The Supreme Court currently operates under Amendment 80 of the Arkansas Constitution. Justices are elected in non-partisan elections to eight-year terms, staggered to make it unlikely the Court would be replaced in a single election. Mid-term Vacancies are filled by gubernatorial appointment.

Each justice has a single vote in deciding the cases argued before the Court.

The Court meets in the Supreme Court Building in Little Rock, Arkansas.

== Membership ==
Position	Name	Born	Start	Term ends	Mandatory retirement (Note: Justices are prohibited from running for re-election past the age of 70. However, they may serve past 70 to finish the rest of their term where they were previously elected to.)	Appointer	Law school
1	Karen R. Baker, Chief Justice	1963 (age 62–63)	January 1, 2011 (Note: Initially served as Associate Justice for Seat 6 from January 1, 2011 – December 31, 2024. Elected to Chief Justice in 2024 and took office on January 1, 2025.)	2030	2040	—N/a (Note: Took office after being elected in a nonpartisan election.)	UA Little Rock
2	Courtney Rae Hudson	1973 (age 52–53)	January 1, 2011 (Note: Initially served as Associate Justice Seat 3 from January 1, 2011 – December 31, 2024. Elected to Position 2 in 2024 and took office on January 1, 2025.)	2032	2048	—N/a	Arkansas
7	Rhonda K. Wood	December 10, 1969 (age 56)	January 1, 2015	2030	2046	—N/a	UA Little Rock
5	Shawn Womack	August 13, 1972 (age 54)	January 1, 2017	2032	2048	—N/a	Arkansas
4	Barbara Womack Webb (Note: Webb went on an extended absence on May 12, 2026 due to surgery and recovery from a head injury sustained in a fall the previous fall. Sarah Huckabee Sanders appointed Cory Cox as an ad hoc special justice on May 12, 2026. Chief Justice Karen R. Baker formally requested a temporary special justice appointment rather than per case on August 10, which Sanders again named Cox to the longer term interim period on August 19. Cox was formally sworn into this role on September 10 until December 31 or Webb's return (whichever is first).)	1956 or 1957 (age 68–69)	January 1, 2021	2028	2028	—N/a	Arkansas
3	J. Cody Hiland	1972 (age 53–54)	July 3, 2023 (Note: Appointed to Seat 2 from July 3, 2023 – December 31, 2024. Reappointed to Seat 3 on January 1, 2025.)	2034	2048	Sarah Huckabee Sanders (R)	UA Little Rock
6	Nicholas Bronni	1982 or 1983 (age 43–44)	January 1, 2025	2034	2056	Sarah Huckabee Sanders (R)	Michigan

=== Vacancy and pending nomination ===
Vacator	Reason	Vacancy Date	Nominee	Nomination Date
J. Cody Hiland	Elevation	TBD	Pending	TBD
