= 2016 Arkansas elections =

A general election was held in the U.S. state of Arkansas on November 8, 2016. Along with the presidential election, a U.S. Senate seat and all four seats in the U.S. House of Representatives as well as some state offices were also up for election. Primaries were held on March 1, 2016.

== Federal offices ==
=== President of the United States ===
Arkansas had six electoral votes in the Electoral College. Republican candidate Donald Trump won the state with 60% of the vote.

=== U.S. Senate ===
Incumbent Republican senator John Boozman won reelection to a second term with 60% of the vote.

=== U.S. House of Representatives ===
Arkansas had four seats in the United States House of Representatives. The Republican Party won all of them; no seats changed hands.

== General Assembly ==
=== State Senate ===
17 out of 35 seats in the Arkansas Senate were up for election. Republicans won 13 while Democrats won four. The resulting composition was 26 Republicans and nine Democrats, with Republicans making a gain of two seats.

2016 Arkansas Senate election
Party	Before	After	Change
Republican	24	26	▲2
Democratic	11	9	▼2
Total	35		

=== State House of Representatives ===
All 100 seats in the Arkansas House of Representatives were up for election. Republicans won 73 while Democrats won 27, with Republicans gaining nine seats.

2016 Arkansas House of Representatives election
Party	Before	After	Change
Republican	64	73	▲9
Democratic	34	27	▼7
Independent	1	0	▼1
vacant	1	0	▼1
Total	100		

== State Supreme Court ==
Two seats on the Arkansas Supreme Court were up for election.

=== Chief Justice ===
Incumbent Justice Howard Brill was appointed by Governor Asa Hutchinson to serve the remaining term of Jim Hannah, who retired citing health concerns.

==== Candidates ====
- Dan Kemp, criminal court judge
- Courtney Goodson, associate justice

==== General election ====
Results by county Kemp: 50–60%; 60–70%; 70–80%; 80–90%; Goodson: 50–60%; Other: Data Unavailable

2016 Arkansas Supreme Court Chief Justice election
Party	Candidate	Votes	%
Nonpartisan	Dan Kemp	344,523	57.57
Nonpartisan	Courtney Goodson	253,941	42.43
Total votes		598,464	100

=== Associate Justice, Position 5 ===
Incumbent Justice Paul Danielson chose not to seek another term.

==== Candidates ====
- Shawn Womack, circuit court judge
- Clark Mason, attorney

==== General election ====
Results by county Womack: 50–60%; 60–70%; 70–80%; 80–90%; Other: Data Unavailable

2016 Arkansas Supreme Court Associate Justice Position 5 election
Party	Candidate	Votes	%
Nonpartisan	Shawn Womack	378,444	67.50
Nonpartisan	Clark Mason	182,182	32.50
Total votes		560,626	100

== Ballot measures ==
Four statewide measures appeared on the ballot in 2016, all of which were approved.

=== Issue 1 ===
Issue 1 results by county Yes: 70–80%; 60–70%

The Arkansas Increase in Length of Term in Office for Some County Officials Amendment, or simply Arkansas Issue 1, would increase the term lengths for elected county judges, county court clerks, and county surveyors from two years to four years and prohibit certain elected county officials from being appointed or elected to a different civil office during their term.

Arkansas Issue 1
Choice	Votes	%
For	747,856	70.22
Against	317,093	29.78
Total	1,064,949	100.00

=== Issue 2 ===
Issue 2 results by county Yes: 70–80%; 60–70%

The Arkansas Gubernatorial Power When Governor is Absent from State Amendment, or simply Arkansas Issue 2, would let Arkansas governors keep their regular political authority when out of the state.

Arkansas Issue 2
Choice	Votes	%
For	777,973	72.42
Against	296,291	27.58
Total	1,074,264	100.00

=== Issue 3 ===
Issue 3 results by county Yes: 80–90%; 70–80%; 60–70%; 50–60%

The Arkansas Removal of Cap on State-Issued Bonds Amendment, or simply Arkansas Issue 3, would remove the cap on the amount of bonds the state is allowed to issue.

Arkansas Issue 3
Choice	Votes	%
For	689,980	65.34
Against	366,020	34.66
Total	1,056,000	100.00

=== Issue 6 ===
Issue 6 results by county Yes: 60–70%; 50–60%; No: 50–60%

The Arkansas Medical Marijuana Amendment, or simply Arkansas Issue 6, would legalize medical marijuana in the state.

Arkansas Issue 6
Choice	Votes	%
For	585,030	53.11
Against	516,525	46.89
Total	1,101,555	100.00
