= 2014 in LGBTQ rights =

This is a list of notable events in the history of LGBTQ rights that took place in the year 2014.

== Events ==
=== January ===
- 13 – Nigeria passes a law that makes same-sex marriage illegal, along with public displays of same-sex relationships and belonging to homosexual groups. The law enshrined punishments for those that violate it. This includes those in a same-sex marriage or civil union being sentenced to 14 years in prison and foreign partnerships being "void"; additionally those who register, operate or participate in gay clubs, societies and organizations or who directly or indirectly make public display of affection as part of a same-sex relationship would be punished with up to 10 years in prison.
- 14 – In Bishop v. Oklahoma, U.S. District Court Judge Terence Kern ruled that the Oklahoma's ban on gay marriage violates the equal protection clause of the U.S. constitution for homosexual couples. The decision was immediately stayed, pending an appeal by the government of Oklahoma.
- 27 – Northern Cyprus repeals Criminal Code provisions which punished consensual sexual acts between adult men

=== February ===
- 4 – The Scottish Parliament approves same-sex marriage bill.
- 12 – In Bourke v. Beshear, U.S. District Judge John G. Heyburn ruled that Kentucky's ban on recognizing same-sex marriages performed in other states violates equal protection clause under the 14th Amendment. This ruling does not require the state to perform same-sex marriages.
- 13 – In Bostic v. Rainey, U.S. District Judge Arenda Wright Allen ruled that Virginia's ban on same-sex marriage violates the equal protection clause under the 14th Amendment for gay and lesbian couples.
- 25 – Ugandan President Yoweri Museveni signs the Anti-Homosexuality Bill into law that criminalises consensual same-sex relations.
- 26 – In De Leon v. Perry, U.S. District Judge Orlando Garcia ruled that Texas's ban on same-sex marriage was unconstitutional. The ruling has been stayed pending an appeal.

=== March ===
- 21 – In DeBoer v. Snyder, U.S. District Judge Bernard Friedman ruled that Michigan's ban on same-sex marriage was unconstitutional.
- 29 – In England and Wales, same-sex marriages start under the Marriage (Same Sex Couples) Act 2013.

=== April ===
- 14 – In Henry v. Wymyslo, U.S. District Judge Timothy Black ruled that Ohio's ban on recognizing same-sex marriages performed in other states was unconstitutional. This ruling, however, does not require the state to perform same-sex marriages. The judge partially stayed his ruling on 16 April while the state of Ohio appealed.
- 14 – In Malta parliament approves a civil partnership bill.
- 15 – India officially recognizes a third gender after a Supreme Court ruling. It paves the way for access to welfare schemes along the lines of other minority groups in the country.

=== May ===
- 9 – In Wright v. Arkansas, Pulaski County Circuit Court Judge Chris Piazza ruled that Arkansas's ban on same-sex marriage was unconstitutional.
- 10 – American football defensive end Michael Sam was picked by the St. Louis Rams during the seventh round of the NFL draft, becoming the first openly gay player drafted by an NFL team.
- 12 – In Latta v. Otter, U.S. District Magistrate Judge Candy Dale ruled that Idaho's ban on same-sex marriage was unconstitutional.
- 19 – In Geiger v. Kitzhaber, U.S. District Court Judge Michael McShane ruled that the Oregon's ban on same-sex marriage violates the equal protection clause of the U.S. constitution for gay and lesbian couples.
- 20 – In Whitewood v. Wolf, U.S. District Court Judge John E. Jones III ruled that the Pennsylvania's ban on same-sex marriage was unconstitutional.

=== June ===
- 6 – In Wolf v. Walker, U.S. District Court Judge Barbara Crabb ruled that Wisconsin's constitutional and legislative ban on gay marriage violates the due process clause of the U.S. constitution, and discriminates on the basis of sexual orientation, violating the equal protection clause.
- 18 – In Luxembourg parliament approves same-sex marriage bill.
- 19 - The Presbyterian Church (USA) voted to allow same-gender marriages during its 221st General Assembly.
- 25
  - In Baskin v. Bogan, U.S. District Court Judge Richard Young ruled that Indiana's statutory ban on gay marriage violates the equal protection clause of the U.S. Constitution.
  - In Kitchen v. Herbert, the United States Court of Appeals for the Tenth Circuit upheld a lower court ruling that struck down Utah's gay marriage ban. The ruling has been stayed, pending an appeal.

=== July ===
- 1 – In Bourke v. Beshear / Love v. Beshear, U.S. District Judge John G. Heyburn expanded his previous ruling, striking down Kentucky's ban on gay marriage as unconstitutional.
- 9 – In a combined case of Brinkman v. Long and McDaniel-Miccio v. Hickenlooper, State District Court Judge C. Scott Crabtree ruled that Colorado's ban on gay marriage violates the equal protection and due process of the U.S. Constitution. However, the ruling was stayed pending the state's appeal.
- 15 – The Croatian Parliament approves a civil partnership bill.
- 17 – In Huntsman v. Heavilin, Florida District Court Judge Luis M. Garcia ruled that the state's constitutional ban on same-sex marriage violates the equal protection clause of the U.S. Constitution. The ruling only applies to Monroe County and has since been stayed, pending appeal.
- 18 – In Bishop v. Oklahoma, the United States Court of Appeals for the Tenth Circuit upheld a lower court ruling that struck down Oklahoma's gay marriage ban. The ruling has been stayed, pending an appeal.
- 21 – United States President Barack Obama signed an executive order expanding employment protections for federal workers and contractors to include gender identity. This order also bans sexual orientation and gender identity discrimination for companies receiving federal contracts.
- 25 – In Pareto v. Ruvin, Florida Circuit Court Judge Sarah Zabel ruled that the state's constitutional ban on same-sex marriage violates the equal protection clause of the U.S. Constitution. The ruling is similar to the decision made in Huntsman v. Heavilin but only applies to Miami-Dade County, Florida, and has been stayed, pending appeal.
- 28 – In Bostic v. Rainey, the United States Court of Appeals for the Fourth Circuit upheld a lower court ruling that struck down Virginia's same-sex marriage ban. The ruling has been stayed, pending an appeal.
- 31 – Palau's revised penal code comes into effect, decriminalising male homosexual activity in the process making homosexuality wholly legal in the country.

=== August ===
- 1 – The Constitutional Court of Uganda invalidated the Anti-Homosexuality Bill as not enough members of parliament were present to vote on the bill.
- 21 – In Brenner v. Scott, U.S. District Judge Robert L. Hinkle ruled that Florida's constitutional ban on same-sex marriage violates the equal protection clause of the U.S. Constitution. The ruling has been stayed, pending appeal.

=== September ===
- 1 – The Congress in the Mexican state of Coahuila voted to legalize same-sex marriage.
- 4 – In two cases, Wolf v. Walker and Baskin v. Bogan, the United States Court of Appeals for the Seventh Circuit ruled unanimously that same-sex marriage bans in Wisconsin and Indiana are unconstitutional.

=== October ===
- 6
  - The Supreme Court of the United States denied appeal requests from five states seeking to prohibit same-sex marriage. With this decision, the appellate court rulings are allowed to stand, effectively legalizing same-sex marriage in Indiana, Oklahoma, Utah, Virginia, and Wisconsin. Also, same-sex marriage bans in Colorado, Kansas, North Carolina, South Carolina, West Virginia, and Wyoming are likely to be considered invalidated as these states are under the same appellate court rulings.
  - Missouri will recognize same-sex marriages performed in other states after the state Attorney General Chris Koster decided that he wouldn't appeal a lower court's ruling requiring such recognition.
- 7
  - Same-sex marriage was legalized in Colorado after the State Supreme Court lifted injunctions against three county clerks. Attorney General John Suthers ordered all 64 county clerks to begin issuing marriage licenses to same-sex couples.
  - In two cases, Latta v. Otter and Sevcik v. Sandoval, The United States Court of Appeals for the Ninth Circuit ruled unanimously that same-sex marriage bans in Idaho and Nevada are unconstitutional.
- 9
  - Estonia became the first former Soviet country to recognize same-sex partnerships. The law came into effect in 2016.
  - Same-sex marriage was legalized in West Virginia after the State Attorney General Patrick Morrisey decided that he would no longer defend the state's ban on such unions. Governor Earl Ray Tomblin ordered state agencies to begin issuing marriage licenses to same-sex couples.
  - Same-sex marriage was legalized in Nevada after U.S. District Court Judge James C. Mahan issued an injunction allowing state officials to issue marriage licenses to same-sex couples.
- 10
  - Same-sex married couples in Virginia can now legally adopt.
  - Same-sex marriage was legalized in North Carolina.
- 12 – In Hamby v. Parnell, U.S. District Judge Timothy Burgess ruled that Alaska's constitutional ban on same-sex marriage violated the equal protection clause of the United States Constitution.
- 15 – Same-sex marriage was legalized in Idaho.
- 17 – Same-sex marriage was legalized in Arizona after U.S. District Court Judge John Sedwick ruled that state's ban was unconstitutional. The judge refused to grant a stay on his opinion and State Attorney General Tom Horne chose not to appeal.
- 21 – Same-sex marriage was legalized in Wyoming.

=== November ===
- 4 – In Marie v. Moser, U.S. District Court Judge Daniel Crabtree ruled that Kansas' ban on same-sex marriage was unconstitutional.
- 6
  - The United States Court of Appeals for the Sixth Circuit upheld state bans on same-sex marriage in Michigan, Ohio, Kentucky, and Tennessee. This decision splits with the decisions from the four other appellate court and will likely setting up for the U.S. Supreme Court to hear the issue.
  - In State of Missouri v. Florida, St. Louis Circuit Judge Rex Burlison ruled that Missouri's ban on same-sex marriage was unconstitutional. The ruling only applies to St. Louis county.
- 12 – In Bradacs v. Haley, U.S. District Court Judge Richard Mark Gergel ruled that South Carolina's ban on same-sex marriage was unconstitutional.
- 19 – In Rolando v. Fox, U.S. District Judge Brian Morris ruled that Montana's ban on same-sex marriage was unconstitutional. The judge did not issue a stay on his ruling, which allows state officials to begin issuing marriage licenses to same-sex couples.
- 25
  - In Jernigan v. Crane, U.S. District Judge Kristine Baker ruled that Arkansas' ban on same-sex marriage was unconstitutional. The judge stayed her ruling, pending an appeal by the state.
  - In Campaign for Southern Equality v. Bryant, U.S. District Judge Carlton Reeves ruled that Mississippi's ban on same-sex marriage was unconstitutional. The judge stayed his ruling, pending an appeal by the state.
- 28 – The Parliament of Finland approved a citizen's initiative to legalize same-sex marriage. The new law is scheduled to take effect sometime in 2016.

=== December ===
- 17 – Same-sex marriage became legal in Scotland.

== Deaths ==
- 4 September – Joan Rivers, United States comedian, LGBT supporter, complications from surgery.
- 28 December – Leelah Alcorn, transgender teen, suicide.
