= Center for Artistic Revolution =

- U.S. State of Arkansas
- Formation: 2003
- Headquarters: First Presbyterian Church, 800 Scott St., Little Rock
- Director: José Gutiérrez
- Website: Official Facebook page

The Center for Artistic Revolution (CAR) is the statewide lesbian, gay, bisexual and transgender (LGBT) civil rights organization for the U.S. state of Arkansas. Founded in 2003 by Sabrina Zarco and Randi Romo, the organization is currently headed by Romo and is headquartered in downtown Little Rock.

CAR has been at the forefront of many LGBT-related news events in Arkansas, such as the 2004 ballot initiative banning same-sex marriage (the "We the People Project" was created to educate Arkansans on its LGBT population), the 2008 ballot initiative banning unmarried couples from adopting children, the 2010 controversy surrounding school board member Clint McCance's anti-gay comments via Facebook, and the 2011 decision by the newspaper The Batesville Daily Guard to omit a dead man's male lover from his obituary.

CAR is also well known for its "Safe Schools Initiative," tackling the issue of bullying, including the bullying of children who may be perceived to be lesbian, gay, bisexual or transgender. No gay-straight alliances existed in Arkansas schools when CAR was founded in 2003; by the beginning of 2012, thirteen had been organized, with CAR's help, across the state.
