= LGBTQ rights in Arkansas =

- Arkansas (US)
- Legal status: Legal since 2002
- Gender identity: Sex change recognized
- Military: Sexual orientation allowed since 2011 (Don't Ask, Don't Tell Repeal Act of 2010), gender identity allowed since 2021
- Discrimination protections: Sexual orientation and gender identity covered in employment anti-discrimination laws statewide since 2020 (Bostock v. Clayton County)

Family rights
- Recognition of relationships: Same-sex marriage since 2015 (Obergefell v. Hodges)
- Adoption: Legal since 2011 (Arkansas Department of Human Services v. Cole)

Lesbian, gay, bisexual, transgender, and queer (LGBTQ) people in the U.S. state of Arkansas face legal challenges not experienced by non-LGBTQ residents. Same-sex sexual activity in Arkansas was decriminalized in 2002 and legally codified in 2005. Same-sex marriage became briefly legal through a court ruling on May 9, 2014, subject to court stays and appeals. In June 2015, the U.S. Supreme Court ruled in Obergefell v. Hodges that laws banning same-sex marriage are unconstitutional, federally legalizing same-sex marriage in the United States; effectively including Arkansas. Nonetheless, discrimination on the basis of sexual orientation and gender identity was not banned in Arkansas until the Supreme Court banned it nationwide in Bostock v. Clayton County in 2020.

== Law regarding same-sex sexual activity ==
In 1838, Arkansas instituted the first statute against homosexual activity with a provision which read: "Every person convicted of sodomy or buggery will be imprisoned in the state penitentiary for not less than five years nor more than 21 years." In 1864, the Arkansas General Assembly raised the penalty to death, though this was repealed nine years later, and the initial penalty was re-established. The first reported sodomy case occurred in 1921 in Smith v. State, where the defendant was found guilty of "disregarding the laws of nature". In 1925, the Arkansas Supreme Court unanimously held that fellatio (oral sex), whether heterosexual or homosexual, violated the sodomy statute. The legislation was subsequently amended in 1955 to lower the minimum penalty to one-year imprisonment, and in 1977 to penalize only homosexual acts, or sexual acts occurring between humans and animals; but in effect decriminalized sodomy by making it a Class A misdemeanor.

In 1992, Governor Bill Clinton, during his presidential campaign, publicly called for the sodomy law to be repealed. The statement was published on the front page of the Washington Blade.

In 2002, the Arkansas Supreme Court in Picado v. Jegley found that the state statute that made sexual relations between people of the same gender a criminal act was unconstitutional because the law violated a fundamental right to privacy and failed to provide the equal protection of the laws. Previously, the courts had rejected multiple legal challenges to the statute: Connor v. State (1973) where the state Supreme Court rejected arguments that religious prejudice in the law's enactment made it unconstitutional, Carter et al. v. State (1973) where the same court held that the General Assembly could, "within constitutional limits", outlaw anything that was "hurtful to the comfort, safety and welfare of the people and prescribe regulations to promote the public health, morals and safety" and rejected privacy as a fundamental right, and United States v. Lemmons (1983) in which a federal court rejected privacy arguments based on the fact that the act in question had occurred in a public restroom.

On April 4, 2005, the Arkansas House of Representatives passed, by a vote of 85–0 in favor, SB 984, a bill repealing laws against sexual acts among same-sex couples. On April 7, 2005, the Arkansas State Senate passed the bill, by a vote of 35–0 in favor. Governor Mike Huckabee signed the bill into law, and it went into effect on April 12, 2005.

== Recognition of same-sex relationships ==
Arkansas bans same-sex marriage in both state statute and its state Constitution. These provisions have been ruled unconstitutional and are no longer enforced.

On May 9, 2014, Sixth Judicial Circuit Judge Chris Piazza issued a preliminary ruling in Wright v. Arkansas that found the state's ban on same-sex marriage unconstitutional. On May 15, he issued a final ruling that enjoined enforcement of the state's statutes prohibiting the licensing and recognition of same-sex marriages as well. The Arkansas Supreme Court stayed his ruling while it heard the appeal.

In another lawsuit in federal court, Jernigan v. Crane, on November 25, 2014, Judge Kristine Baker found the state's ban on same-sex marriage unconstitutional and stayed her ruling pending appeal.

On June 26, 2015, the U.S. Supreme Court ruled in Obergefell v. Hodges that bans on same-sex marriage are unconstitutional, effectively legalizing same-sex marriage in the United States. Since then, same-sex couples in Arkansas have been allowed to legally wed.

== Adoption and parenting ==
Arkansas voters approved a ballot measure in November 2008, effective from January 1, 2009, to prohibit by statute cohabiting couples who are not in a recognized marriage from adopting and providing foster care. On April 7, 2011, in Arkansas Department of Human Services v. Cole, the Arkansas Supreme Court unanimously found that the measure "fails to pass constitutional muster" because it "directly and substantially burdens the privacy rights of 'opposite-sex and same-sex individuals' who engage in private, consensual sexual conduct in the bedroom by foreclosing their eligibility to foster or adopt children, should they choose to cohabit with their sexual partner."

Lesbian couples have access to in vitro fertilization and other assisted reproduction services. Per Pavan v. Smith, Arkansas recognizes the non-genetic, non-gestational mother as a legal parent to a child born via donor insemination, but only if the parents are married. In addition, no statute or case law prohibits surrogacy, traditional or gestational. As a result, both are practiced in the state, including by same-sex couples.

=== Birth certificates ===
In December 2015, a circuit judge found Arkansas' birth certificate law unconstitutional because it unfairly discriminated against same-sex couples. The law allowed the heterosexual non-biological father to be listed on his child(ren)'s birth certificates but refused that right for the homosexual non-biological mother. The state appealed the ruling to the Arkansas Supreme Court. In December 2016, the state's Supreme Court ruled that the birth certificate law was constitutional. Supreme Court Judge Jo Hart wrote: "It does not violate equal protection to acknowledge basic biological truths". On June 26, 2017, the U.S. Supreme Court ruled in an unsigned opinion, in Pavan v. Smith, that the Arkansas Supreme Court's ruling was in clear violation of Obergefell v. Hodges and struck down the state's birth certificate law. In October, the state Supreme Court acknowledged that the state law was unconstitutional and ordered that married same-sex couples be treated equally in the issuance of birth certificates.

== Discrimination protections ==
Map of Arkansas counties and cities that have sexual orientation anti–employment discrimination ordinances before Bostock v. Clayton County banned discrimination nationwide in 2020 Sexual orientation and gender identity with anti–employment discrimination ordinance Sexual orientation and gender identity solely in public employment Sexual orientation in public employment Does not protect sexual orientation and gender identity in employment

Arkansas law does not address discrimination based on gender identity or sexual orientation.

The capital city of Little Rock and several other cities, including Conway, Hot Springs and North Little Rock as well as Pulaski County, prohibit discrimination on the basis of sexual orientation and gender identity in public employment (city or county employees). The cities of Marvell and Springdale have similar policies but only ban sexual orientation-based discrimination.

Two cities have enacted comprehensive anti-discrimination ordinances addressing both public and private employment discrimination on account of sexual orientation and gender identity. These are Eureka Springs and Fayetteville. However, both these ordinances are unenforced due to the passage of the Intrastate Commerce Improvement Act. In February 2017, the Arkansas Supreme Court struck down Fayetteville's anti-discrimination ordinance because it included sexual orientation and gender identity as protected categories. The court found that the ordinance contravened the act. Following the ruling, Fayetteville City Attorney Kit Williams said he would focus on challenging the constitutionality of the act.

=== Intrastate Commerce Improvement Act ===
On February 9, 2015, the Arkansas State Senate passed, with 24 voting in favor, 8 voting against, and 2 not voting, the Intrastate Commerce Improvement Act, legislation that prohibits counties, municipalities or other political subdivisions in the state from adopting anti-discrimination ordinances that creates a protected classification or prohibits discrimination on a basis not contained in state law. On February 13, 2015, the Arkansas House of Representatives passed, with a 58 in favor, 21 voting against, 14 not voting, and 7 voting present. An emergency clause to the bill was rejected by the House.

== Hate crime law ==
Arkansas has no hate crime statute that attaches penalties to criminal convictions when motivated by bias, but a state statute does allow victims to sue for damages or seek court-ordered relief for acts of intimidation, harassment, violence, or property damage "where such acts are motivated by racial, religious, or ethnic animosity", not sexual orientation or gender identity. However, sexual orientation and gender identity are covered under U.S. federal law since the Matthew Shepard and James Byrd, Jr. Hate Crimes Prevention Act was signed into law in October 2009.

=== Watered-down version hate crime laws ===
In April 2021, the Arkansas Legislature overwhelmingly passed a "watered-down weak version" of a hate crimes bill - that does not include both "sexual orientation or gender identity" explicitly or implicitly. The Governor of Arkansas signed the bill into law effective immediately. Only Wyoming and South Carolina as hold outs are yet to introduce or implement hate crime laws across the United States.

== Healthcare denial bill ==
In early 2021, a bill (SB 289) to allow medical practitioners to cite their religious beliefs to deny healthcare to LGBT patients passed the Arkansas House of Representatives and the Arkansas Senate. Both Mississippi and Illinois have similar laws. On March 26, Governor Asa Hutchinson signed the bill into law effective immediately.

== Gender identity and expression ==
Since 1981, Arkansas law permits transgender people to amend their birth certificates upon receipt of a court order verifying that they have undergone sex reassignment surgery and that their names have been changed.

Besides male and female, Arkansas identity documents are available with an "X" sex descriptor. The Arkansas Department of Finance and Administration has issued such documentation since December 2010. In March 2024, the DFA rescinded its support of X descriptors for driver's licences.

=== Sports ===
In March 2021, the Arkansas Legislature passed a bill to legally ban transgender athletes from sports and athletics. On March 25, the bill was signed into law by the Governor of Arkansas and became effective immediately.

=== Transgender healthcare ===
In March 2021, the Arkansas Legislature passed HB 1570, a bill to legally ban puberty blockers, hormone therapy and/or sex reassignment surgery on individuals under the age of 18. (Sex reassignment surgery is not performed on minors in Arkansas.) Governor Asa Hutchinson vetoed the bill on April 5, calling it "overbroad" and "extreme", but the Legislature overrode his veto the next day. The ACLU sued the state, and a federal judge blocked enforcement of the law so that the lawsuit could proceed. and a federal judge issued an injunction preventing the law from taking effect, saying the law would cause "irreparable harm" to minors if allowed to go into effect.

On June 20, 2023, federal judge James M. Moody Jr., who had previously blocked the law from taking effect, issued a ruling striking down the law. In his ruling he argued that the law discriminated against transgender people and violated the constitutional rights of doctors, and that the state did not adequately prove its claim regarding the supposed experimental nature of transition care. The state's attorney general, Tim Griffin, and Governor Sanders vowed to appeal the decision.

On August 12, 2025, the Eighth Circuit Court of Appeals overturned the lower court's ruling and allowed the state to enforce the law, citing the U.S. Supreme Court's ruling in United States v. Skrmetti.

=== Gender-affirming litigation bill ===
In March 2023, the Arkansas Legislature passed a bill to allow individuals to sue doctors, nurses or other health employees for gender-affirming healthcare provided to them as minors. After turning 18, the person has 15 years to sue—whereas lawsuits for other types of care generally must be filed within two years. On March 13, 2023, Governor Sarah Huckabee Sanders signed it into law. It will take effect in the summer.

=== Bathroom ban with sex offender registration penalties ===
On April 11, 2023, a bathroom bill became Act 619. The previous February, the Arkansas state legislature had put it forth as SB270, to amend the definition of "sexual indecency with a child" to include any trans person using a public bathroom, locker room, changing room, or other public changing facility matching their gender identity while a minor is also inside. Subsequently, it was narrowed. In the final version, the misdemeanor depends on the intent of "arousing or gratifying a sexual desire".

On March 21, 2023, Governor Sarah Huckabee Sanders signed a different law prohibiting trans people from using public school bathrooms that match their gender. This made Arkansas the fourth state to pass a law about public school bathrooms, following Alabama, Oklahoma and Tennessee, while Idaho and Iowa's approved bills had yet to be signed by their governors.

== Public opinion ==
A 2017 Public Religion Research Institute poll found that 52% of Arkansas residents supported same-sex marriage, while 38% opposed it and 10% were unsure. The same poll found that 64% of Arkansans supported an anti-discrimination law covering sexual orientation and gender identity, while 27% were opposed. Furthermore, 53% were against allowing public businesses to refuse to serve LGBTQ people due to religious beliefs, while 41% supported allowing such religiously-based refusals.

A 2022 Public Religion Research Institute poll found that 51% of Arkansas residents supported same-sex marriage, while 47% opposed it and 1% were unsure. The same poll found that 74% of Arkansans supported an anti-discrimination law covering sexual orientation and gender identity, while 24% were opposed. 2% were undecided. Furthermore, 55% were against allowing public businesses to refuse to serve LGBTQ people due to religious beliefs, while 43% supported allowing such religiously-based refusals. 1% were undecided.

Public opinion for LGBT anti-discrimination laws in Arkansas
Poll source	Date(s) administered	Sample size	Margin of error	% support	% opposition	% no opinion
Public Religion Research Institute	January 3-December 30, 2018	547	?	56%	33%	11%
Public Religion Research Institute	April 5-December 23, 2017	641	?	64%	27%	9%
Public Religion Research Institute	April 29, 2015-January 7, 2016	782	?	57%	38%	5%

== Summary table ==
Same-sex sexual activity legal	Yes (Since 2002; codified in 2005)
Equal age of consent (16)	Yes (Since 2002)
Anti-discrimination laws in employment	Yes (Since 2020)
Anti-discrimination laws in the provision of goods and services	No (Prohibited by the Intrastate Commerce Improvement Act since 2015)
Anti Discrimination laws in housing	No (Prohibited by the Intrastate Commerce Improvement Act since 2015)
Anti Discrimination laws in public accommodations	No (Prohibited by the Intrastate Commerce Improvement Act since 2015)
Anti-discrimination laws in all other areas	No (Prohibited by the Intrastate Commerce Improvement Act since 2015)
LGBT anti-bullying law in schools and colleges	Yes
Hate crime laws inclusive of sexual orientation and gender identity	No
Transgender persons in prisons, jails, juvenile detentions, etc. required to be housed according to their gender identity and coverage of transition healthcare	No
Gender confirmation surgery, puberty blockers, hormone replacement therapy and other transition-related healthcare for transgender people required to be covered under health insurance and state Medicaid policies	No (Explicitly banned)
Transgender people allowed to use restrooms and other gender-segregated spaces that correspond with their gender identity	No (Since 2023)
Transgender athletes allowed to participate in the sport of their gender identity (highly controversial)	Yes / No (AMAB transgender individuals in specific are explicitly banned)
Gender-neutral bathrooms	No
Same-sex marriages	Yes (Since 2015)
Stepchild adoption by same-sex couples	Yes (Since 2011)
Joint adoption by same-sex couples	Yes (Since 2011)
Gays, lesbians and bisexuals allowed to serve openly in the military	Yes (Since 2011)
Transgender people allowed to serve openly in the military	No (Since 2025)
Transvestites allowed to serve openly in the military	No
Intersex people allowed to serve openly in the military	(Current DoD policy bans "Hermaphrodites" from serving or enlisting in the military)
Right to change legal gender	Yes (Requires sex reassignment surgery)
Third gender option	(Since 2024)
LGBT education	X
Access to IVF for lesbians	Yes
Conversion therapy banned for minors	No
Intersex minors protected from invasive surgical procedures	No
Gay panic defense banned	No
Commercial surrogacy for gay male couples	Yes
Homosexuality declassified as a mental illness	Yes (Since 1973)
Transgender identity declassified as a mental illness	No (Reclassified as "gender dysphoria" under DSM-5 since 2013, and diagnosis of gender dysphoria is usually required in order to access transition care)
Intersex sex characteristics declassified as a physical deformity	
Men who have sex with men allowed to donate blood	Yes / No (Since 2020; 3-month deferral period)
