= Same-sex adoption in the United States =

Until 2017, laws related to same-sex couples adopting children varied by state. Some states granted full adoption rights to same-sex couples, while others banned same-sex adoption or only allowed one partner in a same-sex relationship to adopt the biological child of the other.

On 31 March 2016, Federal District Court struck down Mississippi's ban on same-sex couple adoptions. On June 26, 2017, the United States Supreme Court reversed an Arkansas Supreme Court ruling that allowed a law listing parents by gender on birth certificates to stand. The new SCOTUS ruling allowed both same-sex spouses to be listed on birth certificates. These court rulings made adoption by same-sex couples legal in all 50 states.

In 2022, Congress passed the Respect for Marriage Act which requires that states respect marriage licenses of same-sex couples as long as the marriage was valid in the state in which it was performed. This act repeals the 1996 Defense of Marriage Act which defined marriage as the union of one man and one woman and allowed states to decline to recognize same-sex marriages that were performed in other states.

Attitudes toward same-sex parenting have improved as the number of same-sex couples and same-sex parenting overall has increased in the United States. From 2007 to 2011, public condemnation of same-sex parenting in the U.S. dropped from 50% to 35%, while acceptance has remained relatively stable.

In 2023, same-sex couples were more likely to raise an adopted child. 4% of adopted children and 3% of foster children were being raised by LGBTQ+ couples. After Mississippi was the last state to overturn laws banning LGBTQ+ adoption and the federal marriage equality ruling in 2015, there are now protection rights for same-sex couples to adopt throughout the United States which has brought more acceptance and support for same-sex couples when adopting children.

Studies have found that same-sex couples often favor adoption as the method for starting a family. They tend to place significantly less emphasis on the biological methods of conceiving a child than heterosexual families do. LGBTQ families are up to 10 times more likely to adopt than heterosexual couples. Additionally, an organization called Creating A Family reported that 60% of adoptions by LGBTQ families are transracial. One study even found that "gay and lesbian parents were more likely than heterosexual parents to be matched with hard-to-place children, partially because they were more open to being matched with children with hard-to-place profiles." Some argue that these statistics are due, in some part, to discriminatory practices that make it more difficult to adopt for LGBTQ families and deem minority children less “ideal” adoptees.

== Background ==
On April 6, 1999, the American Civil Liberties Union (ACLU) published Overview of Lesbian and Gay Parenting, Adoption, and Foster Care. Key findings included:

- There is no evidence to suggest that lesbians and gay men are less fit to be parents than heterosexual couples.
- Home environments with lesbian and gay parents are just as likely to successfully support a child's development as those with heterosexual parents.
- Good parenting is not influenced by sexual orientation. Rather, it is influenced most profoundly by a parent's ability to create a loving and nurturing home, an ability that does not depend on whether the parent is gay or straight.
- There is no evidence to suggest that the children of lesbian and gay parents are less intelligent, suffer from more problems, are less popular, or have lower self-esteem than children of heterosexual parents.
- Children of lesbian and gay parents grow up as happy, healthy, and well-adjusted as the children of heterosexual parents.

Some researchers have written that children of gay and lesbian families are often subjected to teasing and harassment in their peer groups. They also tend to be singled out and questioned about their family life more than children in heteronormative homes.

Formerly, many children raised by same-sex parents had been born into one of their parents' previous heterosexual relationships. As such, many prior legal disputes were over child custody in cases of divorce. There were biases against the parent who was in a now same-sex relationship; these biases caused courts to disfavor them in awarding custody and visitation rights. The sexual orientation of the LGBTQ+ parent, and not their ability to provide for the child's needs, was viewed as having a negative impact on the child's upbringing. Similar to intrauterine insemination using a sperm donor, the introduction of in vitro fertilization enabled lesbian couples to raise children of their own who had not been born from heterosexual relationships. The development of in vitro fertilization created controversy about co-parent adoption and, in cases where lesbian couples separated, child custody. The practice also generated controversy about the presumption of parenthood: when a woman in a heterosexual marriage gives birth, her husband is legally presumed to be the child's father, but courts have only recently extended this privilege to lesbian couples.

For male same-sex couples, becoming a parent can be more costly because surrogacy is the only way for them to have a biological child. As such, adoption is generally the more cost-effective alternative for same-sex couples. The average cost of adoption is around $30,000, while surrogacy starts around $100,000 and can be upwards of $150,000, making adoption the more affordable option.

== Statistics ==
In 2020, the United States Census Bureau determined that same-sex couples (3.1%) are three times more likely to have adopted children than opposite-sex couples (1.1%). Data from 2019 revealed that 43.3% of same-sex couples’ children were adopted and/or stepchildren. Approximately 20.9% of same-sex couples had adoptive children compared to the 2.9% of opposite-sex couples that also had adoptive children.

According to the Williams Institute, as of 2009, "an estimated 20,000 same-sex couples are raising nearly 30,000 adopted children." As of 2011, about two million children in the U.S. were being raised by LGBT parents but could not establish a legal relationship with both parents. In 2019 the American Community Survey revealed that female same-sex households were more likely to have children under 18 in their care (22.5%) than male same-sex households (6.6%).

== Professional assessment ==
There is consensus among the medical, psychological, and social welfare communities that children raised by gay and lesbian parents are just as likely to be well-adjusted as those raised by heterosexual parents and research to support this conclusion is accepted beyond debate in the field of developmental psychology. In 2010, the Third District Court of Appeals of the State of Florida concluded that "based on the robust nature of the evidence available in the field [...] the issue is so far beyond dispute that it would be irrational to hold otherwise; the best interests of children are not preserved by prohibiting homosexual adoption". The most important factors in maintaining a child's welfare depend more on socioeconomic status and less on the gender and sexuality of the parents. Issues arise from uncontrolled factors such as discrimination or the inability of parents to get married. Some individuals who oppose child-rearing by gay and lesbian couples fear that it will result in the child becoming gay or lesbian themselves. Established data, however, does not support this claim.

A qualitative study by Goldberg, Kinkler, Richardson, and Downing surveyed couples in same-sex and heterosexual relationships who had adopted children through open adoption. This was notable as little prior research had focused on gender and sexual orientation in open adoption relationships. Data from 90 individuals, including 30 women in 15 lesbian relationships, 30 men in 15 gay relationships, as well as 15 women and 15 men in heterosexual relationships were analyzed. All couples were adopting their first child and they were all first-time parents. The study was conducted within the borders of the United States. Participants filled out a questionnaire and were interviewed by telephone three to four months after adopting their child. All participants were between the ages of 27 and 52 (average 37.7 years), and 90% were Caucasian. Results indicated that gay and lesbian couples tended to emphasize openness and a desire to pursue adoption without hiding their sexual orientation. The birth mother was the consistent birth family member to keep in touch with the adoptive family, and significantly influenced the shaping of open adoption relationships.

== Public opinion ==
A 2007 poll by CNN and Opinion Research Corporation found that 57% of respondents believed that same-sex couples should have the right to adopt, while 40% felt that they should not. More recently, a Gallup poll from May 2014 found that 63% of respondents believed same-sex couples should have the legal right to adopt a child.

From 1994 to 2012, seven national polling organizations asked representative samples of Americans their opinions about the legalization of same-sex adoption, with the main question being, "Do you think there should or should not be adoption rights [such as] gays and lesbians so they can legally adopt children?" Results from this period indicate an increase in support as time progressed. In 1994 survey responses, about one in four (28%) favored same-sex adoption, while in 2012 about five in ten (50%) favored same-sex adoption. In studies from 1994 to 1999, only one out of every three Americans (33%) favored same-sex adoption; from 2002 to 2008, support increased to four in ten (40% favorability). From 2009 to 2012, a majority (from 52% to 61%) approved legalizing same-gender adoption, with greater support expressed among young people than among those over 65 years of age. Results also showed that 85% of the Democrats asked were in support of same-sex adoption, while only 23% of the Republicans asked were in support of it.

In June 2018, a YouGov poll found that over half of Americans (55%) believed that heterosexual and homosexual couples would be equally good parents. Majorities also supported allowing gay (53%) and lesbian (55%) couples to adopt and raise children. When asked whether gay and straight couples can be equally good parents, 38% of respondents “strongly” agreed. Women (47%) were significantly more likely than men (30%) to strongly agree with this statement. Most respondents (57%), however, also expressed the belief that a child should be raised by both a mother and a father. Another 15% “strongly” or “somewhat” disagreed with that idea. In this case, men (47%) were more likely than women (30%) to strongly agree with the statement that children should be raised by a mother and father. When asked if lesbian couples should be able to adopt and raise children, 55% said yes while 29% said no. When asked about gay male couples, 53% agreed and 32% disagreed. In both instances, women were significantly more likely than men to agree to same-sex couple adoption. Almost half of Americans (47%) said that it was unfair that child welfare agencies can refuse to place a child with a same-sex couple based on religious objection, while one-third (33%) said it was fair. Forty-six percent supported a Connecticut initiative to recruit members of the LGBTQ+ community to become foster and adoptive parents, but twenty-nine percent opposed that measure.

Research conducted by Andrew L. Whitehead and Samuel L. Perry suggests that rising support of adoption by same-sex couples does not indicate changing normative stereotypes about homosexuality. Even when asked questions that suggested that the well-being of the children of same-sex couples was lower, survey respondents tend to support adoption by same-sex parents. This research suggests that rising public support may not be a result of a growing acceptance of the LGBT community, but rather from the growing resentment towards state-funded foster programs. The same study also held that religious affiliations matter less for predicting same-sex adoption attitudes than how Americans practice and hold their faith; notably, support for same-sex adoption was lower among religious respondents who more frequently engage in practices such as religious service attendance and sacred text reading, with support higher among those who believe that the Bible may contain human error.

Gallup's Values and Beliefs poll, which was conducted from May 3-18, 2021, recorded that 70% of Americans support same-sex marriage. Additionally, 87% support interracial marriage. A YouGov survey conducted in May 2019 found that 49% of Americans think it is not okay for adoption and foster agencies to decline placing a child with a same-sex couple for religious reasons; however 36% of Americans said this was acceptable.

In 2021 Ipsos created and shared a poll worldwide on the question "Do you agree that same-sex couples should have the same rights to adopt children as heterosexual couples do?" and the United States responded with seventy-two percent of them strongly/ somewhat agreeing with the statement, six percent responded with not sure, and twenty-two percent of them responded with strongly/ somewhat disagreeing with the statement.

== Professional organizations ==
Professional organizations that support gay and lesbian families' adoption include the Child Welfare League of America, the American Psychiatric Association, the American Psychological Association, the American Academy of Pediatrics, and the National Association of Social Workers (NASW).The Child Welfare League of America (CWLA) affirms that "lesbian, gay, and bisexual parents are as well suited to raise children as their heterosexual counterparts". American Psychiatric Association supports same-sex marriage as "being advantageous to the mental health of same-sex couples and supports legal recognition of the right for same-sex couples to marry, adopt and co-parent". Each of these organizations released similar statements supporting same-sex adoption following the government legalization of same-sex adoption in all fifty states in 2016.

Furthermore, there are many adoption agencies, lawyers, and social workers who work specifically to support LGBTQ+ parents, including AdoptUSKids, American Academy of Pediatrics, Human Rights Campaign Foundation, LifeLong Adoptions, A is 4 Adoption, International Lesbian and Gay Organization, National Center for Lesbian Rights, and the National Gay and Lesbian Task Force. The US Department of State provides these resources and more to those who are seeking state and federal adoption information.

Foundations and support organizations like the Dave Thomas Foundation for Adoption, and the National Adoption Foundation, have funded grants for same-sex couples, and other organizations that support the LGBTQ+ in adoption.

== Politics ==
On July 29, 1999, U.S. Representative Steve Largent introduced amendment 356 (H.Amdt. 356) to the District of Columbia Appropriations Act, 2000 (H.R. 2587), which would have banned joint adoption between individuals unrelated by blood or marriage in Washington, D.C. The amendment failed with 213 votes in favor and 215 opposed.

In 2004, Jeb Bush, the then-Governor of Florida, was quoted saying: "[I]t is in the best interest of adoptive children, many of whom come from troubled and unstable backgrounds, to be placed in a home anchored both by a father and a mother."

On May 10, 2012, Republican presidential candidate Mitt Romney told an interviewer: "And if two people of the same gender want to live together, want to have a loving relationship, or even to adopt a child – in my state individuals of the same sex were able to adopt children. In my view, that's something that people have a right to do." Asked the next day to reconcile that with his opposition to same-sex marriage, he said: "Well actually I think all states but one allow gay adoption, so that's a position which has been decided by most of the state legislators, including the one in my state some time ago. So I simply acknowledge the fact that gay adoption is legal in all states but one."

Currently, there are legal appeals in a number of states to allow for co-parent adoption, commonly known as second-parent adoption, whereby one parent can adopt the biological child of their same-sex partner without voiding their partner's parental guardianship over the child. This allows the child to be recognized as having two legal parents in cases where the couple is not in a relationship recognized by the state. For the states that allow same-sex couples to adopt, most require that adoptive couples must be married; in the states without specific relevant laws, this issue is addressed based on the best interest of the Adoption and Safe Families Act of 1997 (H.R. 867).

== Legal status ==
=== Law on same-sex adoption ===
==== Federal law ====
On May 16, 2013, the Every Child Deserves a Family Act was introduced to Congress but was not enacted. The act would have stipulated that any organization that deals with foster and adoptive care of children and has some form of funding from the federal government could not discriminate against "prospective adoptive or foster parents solely on the basis of their sexual orientation, gender identification, or marital status or on the basis of the sexual orientation or gender identity of the child involved." As the bill only applied to centers that were federally funded, however, private institutions would still have been able to refuse same-sex couples from adopting. In January 2019, the state of South Carolina applied for and was granted a waiver to let adoption agencies block same-sex couples from adopting or becoming foster parents. A Greenville couple has filed a lawsuit in this case and its outcome is pending.

Supreme Court cases, like Baker v. State (1999) and Varnum v. Brien (2009), have set a precedent for same-sex parents of adopted children by siding with them, however states still have individual jurisdiction.

==== State law ====
As of 2021, each state is able to make its own laws about LGBTQ discrimination in foster care, second-parent adoption, and parental presumption in same-sex relationships. Many states continue to explicitly allow discrimination within the foster care system and adoption placement or have no laws to prevent discrimination. Most states also do not require training for foster parents regarding LGBTQ youth. Many states also do not permit second-parent adoptions for same-sex couples regardless of whether their relationship is legally recognized. Other states do not presume that a parental relationship exists with any children born of that marriage for both parents in a same-sex marriage as they would for children born of an opposite-sex relationship.

Laws Regarding LGBT Adoptions by State
State	Second Parent Adoption	Foster Care Non-Discrimination Laws	Foster Care Parent Training Required	Parental Presumption for Same-Sex Couples	Laws Permitting Discrimination in Adoption/Foster Placement
Alabama	No	No	No	No	Yes
Alaska	No	No	No	Yes	No
Arizona	No	No	No	Yes	Yes
Arkansas	No	No	No	No	No
California	Yes	Yes	Yes	Yes	No
Colorado	Yes	Yes	No	Yes	No
Connecticut	Yes	Yes	No	Yes	No
Delaware	Yes	No	No	Yes	No
District of Columbia	Yes	Yes	Yes	Yes	No
Florida	No	No	No	Yes	No
Georgia	No	No	No	No	No
Hawaii	No	No	No	Yes	No
Idaho	Yes	No	No	No	No
Illinois	Yes	Yes	No	Yes	No
Indiana	No	No	No	Yes	No
Iowa	No	Yes	No	Yes	No
Kansas	No	No	No	No	No
Kentucky	No	No	No	No	No
Louisiana	No	No	No	No	No
Maine	Yes	No	No	Yes	No
Maryland	Yes	No	No	No	No
Massachusetts	Yes	Yes	Yes	Yes	No
Michigan	No	No	No	No	Yes
Minnesota	No	Yes	Yes	Yes	No
Mississippi	No	No	No	No	Yes
Missouri	No	No	No	No	No
Montana	Yes	No	No	No	Yes
Nebraska	No	No	No	No	No
Nevada	No	No	Yes	Yes	No
New Hampshire	Yes	Yes	No	Yes	No
New Jersey	Yes	Yes	No	Yes	No
New Mexico	No	Yes	Yes	Yes	No
New York	Yes	Yes	No	Yes	No
North Carolina	No	No	No	Yes	No
North Dakota	No	No	No	No	Yes
Ohio	No	Yes	No	No	No
Oklahoma	No	No	No	No	Yes
Oregon	Yes	Yes	No	Yes	No
Pennsylvania	Yes	No	No	No	No
Rhode Island	Yes	Yes	No	Yes	No
South Carolina	No	No	No	No	Yes
South Dakota	Yes	No	No	No	Yes
Tennessee	No	No	No	No	Yes
Texas	No	No	No	Yes	Yes
Utah	No	No	Yes	Yes	No
Vermont	Yes	Yes	No	Yes	No
Virginia	No	No	No	No	Yes
Washington	No	No	No	Yes	No
West Virginia	No	No	No	No	No
Wisconsin	No	Yes	No	Yes	No
Wyoming	No	No	No	No	No

=== Cases ===
==== Alabama ====
On October 12, 2012, the Alabama Court of Civil Appeals unanimously turned down the request of a woman to adopt her same-sex spouse's child. The couple had been married in California. The court held that Alabama law did not recognize the women as spouses.

===== V.L. v. E.L. =====
On September 18, 2015, the Supreme Court of Alabama reversed lower courts' recognition of an adoption judgment granted to a same-sex couple over their three children in 2007 by the Superior Court of Fulton County, Georgia. The court ruled that the Georgia state court had misapplied Georgia state law in granting the adoption. In the case of V.L. v. E.L., the Supreme Court of Alabama sided with E.L., the biological mother of the three children (who argued the Georgia court lacked subject matter jurisdiction). The Supreme Court voided the adoption decree's recognition in-state and nullified V.L.'s parental rights. On November 16, V.L. petitioned the United States Supreme Court to allow her to see her children while she appealed. On December 14, the Supreme Court granted her request for a stay of the ruling pending their disposition of V.L.'s petition for a writ of certiorari. This was the first adoption case that reached the Supreme Court after Obergefell v. Hodges.

On March 7, 2016, the United States Supreme Court unanimously reversed the Supreme Court of Alabama. The court ruled that the Alabama Supreme Court violated the Full Faith and Credit Clause when it refused to recognize the adoption decree from Georgia. The U.S. Supreme Court's decision caused the adoption decree from Georgia to be recognized in Alabama, and V.L.'s parental rights were restored. The case was remanded to the Supreme Court of Alabama for further proceedings.

==== Arkansas ====
On November 4, 2008, Arkansas voters approved Act 1, a measure to ban anyone "cohabitating outside of a valid marriage" from being foster parents or adopting children. Although the law could apply to heterosexual couples, it was believed to have been written to target gay couples due to the fact that same-sex marriage was prohibited in that state, thereby making an adoption impossible, although single gay men and lesbians were still allowed to adopt in Arkansas. The law was overturned on April 16, 2010 by state judge Chris Piazza. The Arkansas Supreme Court in Arkansas Department of Human Services v. Cole upheld the lower court's decision on April 7, 2011.

State Circuit Judge Tim Fox of Pulaski County ruled on December 1, 2015 that a state law restricting parental identification on birth certificates to heterosexual couples was unconstitutional. His ruling initially applied only to the three couples who originally sued in this case, Pavan v. Smith. Two days later, he broadened the ruling to apply statewide. On December 10, 2015, the Supreme Court of Arkansas stayed the statewide applicability, but allowed the three plaintiff couples to receive their amended certificates. On December 9, 2016, the Supreme Court of Arkansas reversed the trial court's order.

On June 26, 2017, the U.S. Supreme Court granted the petition for a writ of certiorari sought by the plaintiff's parents and reversed the Arkansas Supreme Court. The Court held by a 6-3 vote that Arkansas' law only allowing for opposite-sex couples to be named on their children's birth certificates was an unconstitutional breach of their ruling in Obergefell v. Hodges.

==== Florida ====
In Florida, a 1977 law prohibited adoption by homosexuals following the Save Our Children campaign led by Anita Bryant. In November 2008, a state circuit court struck down the law through In re: Gill, a case involving a gay male couple raising two foster children placed with them in 2004 by state child welfare workers. Through an appeal on September 22, 2010, Florida's Third District Court of Appeals unanimously upheld the decision of the lower court. The state did not appeal. The 1977 law that banned homosexuals from adoption was repealed on July 1, 2015.

In 2015, a case was brought before federal District Judge Robert Hinkle of the United States District Court for the Northern District of Florida. The Florida Department of Health refused to issue a birth certificate recognizing both partners in a same-sex relationship. The plaintiffs in the case asked Judge Hinkle to declare this policy unconstitutional. He set a deadline of January 6, 2016, for the Department of Health to reply to the plaintiffs' motion for summary judgment. In January 2017, Florida reached a settlement with the plaintiffs, agreeing to issue correct birth certificates to all married same-sex couples on an equal basis.

==== Georgia ====
In July 2022, couple William and Zachary Zulock, were arrested for sexually abusing their two adoptive sons. The case garnered significant attention among right-wing political commentators in the United States, with figures such as Charlie Kirk, Laura Ingraham, and Matt Walsh unfoundedly linking same-sex adoption to the crimes of the Zulock couple. The case was also taken as a political statement by Argentine president Javier Milei, who implied at the 2025 World Economic Forum, that gay men were prone to abusing children and labelling gender ideology as pedophilia.

==== Idaho ====
In 2013, a lesbian couple, married in California but since moved to Idaho, petitioned for second-parent adoption. A state magistrate denied the petition on the grounds that Idaho did not recognize their marriage. On appeal, the Idaho Supreme Court unanimously reversed the magistrate's ruling because Idaho has no specific statutory ban on unmarried second-parent adoption.

==== Illinois ====
Second parent adoption for LGBT couples in Illinois became legal in 1995 after a ruling in favor of K.M. and D.M. (a lesbian couple) to adopt Olivia M. (the biological child of K.M.), and K.L. and M.M. (another lesbian couple) to adopt Michael M. and David M. (David is the biological child of K.L. and Michael is the adoptive child of K.L.). In this case, the court "held that unmarried same-sex cohabitants have standing to jointly petition for adoption as the statutory provisions allow a reputable person of legal age to adopt, and provisions in the singular should be read to include the plural". They argued that because Illinois adoption law explicitly calls for liberal interpretation and a focus on the best interest of the child, the adoptions should be legal. Even though was not likely initially intended to allow for LGBT couples to adopt, they argued that other states (such as Vermont) with similar laws had ruled in favor of second parent adoptions for unmarried LGBT couples and that if the legislature specifically wanted to prevent such an adoption, they could have written the law as such.

==== Indiana ====
On June 30, 2016, a federal judge ruled in Henderson v. Box that Indiana must allow same-sex couples to list both their names on their children's birth certificates. The ruling came as a result of a federal lawsuit filed by eight same-sex couples who were unable to list the non-gestational parent's name on the child's birth certificate. When an opposite-sex couple had a child, the state granted a "presumption of parenthood" to the father and listed him on the birth certificate. However, when a same-sex couple had a child, the state denied that presumption and forced the second partner to undergo an adoption, a "long, arduous and expensive" process. In January 2017, Attorney General Curtis Hill appealed the ruling to the U.S. Court of Appeals for the Seventh Circuit, which unanimously upheld it on January 17, 2020. In December 2020, the SCOTUS declined to hear the case, leaving the Seventh Circuit's ruling in place.

==== Kansas ====
In November 2012, the Kansas Court of Appeals ruled in the case In the Matter of the Adoption of I.M. that a single person who is not a biological parent of a child cannot petition to adopt that child without terminating the other parent's parental rights. Since Kansas did not recognize same-sex marriages, this ruling effectively prevents same-sex couples from second-parent adoption in Kansas. However, the Kansas Supreme Court ruled on February 22, 2013, in Frazier v. Goudschaal, that a partner of a biological parent is entitled to parental rights.

==== Michigan ====
In December 2012, the Michigan Court of Appeals ruled that the state's adoption code permits second parent adoptions by same-sex couples.

A female same-sex couple, who were raising three children and adopted one of them, filed a lawsuit in federal court in January 2012 seeking to have the state's ban on adoption by same-sex couples overturned, and in September amended that suit to challenge the state's ban on same-sex marriage as well.

On June 26, 2015, the Supreme Court of the United States ultimately ruled in their favor in Obergefell v. Hodges.

==== Mississippi ====
33% of Mississippi's households headed by same-sex couples include a child, the highest such percentage in the nation. Nevertheless, Mississippi's Domestic Relations Code states, "Adoption by couples of the same gender is prohibited." A lawsuit, Campaign for Southern Equality v. Mississippi Department of Human Services, was filed in August 2015 by four Mississippi same-sex couples seeking to overturn this law. The plaintiffs in that case were represented by Roberta Kaplan, who successfully argued United States v. Windsor before the U.S. Supreme Court. Mississippi was the only U.S. state to not have legal joint adoption rights for LGBT couples; the only other jurisdictions under U.S. sovereignty where this is the case are American Samoa and some Native American tribal nations.

Mississippi passed a state law in 2000 which explicitly prohibited same-sex couples from joint adoption. After Obergefell, Mississippi has specifically stated that its ban remains in effect. On August 12, 2015, the Southern Poverty Law Center, joined by four same-sex couples raising children, filed suit in the United States District Court for the Southern District of Mississippi seeking to declare the statute unconstitutional. On March 31, 2016, Judge Daniel P. Jordan III issued a preliminary injunction striking down Mississippi's ban on same-sex couples from adoption, ruling that the ban violates the Equal Protection Clause. There were no immediate plans by the state of Mississippi to appeal the ruling to the U.S. Court of Appeals for the Fifth Circuit.

==== Nebraska ====
Three same-sex couples filed a lawsuit against the state on August 27, 2013, seeking the right to serve as foster and adoptive parents. The lawsuit claimed that the state's policy against allowing two unrelated adults to adopt has been consistently enforced only against same-sex couples.

==== New York ====
An October 2012 court ruling in a custody dispute between two women in a same-sex relationship awarded custody to the adoptive parent rather than the biological mother.

==== Wisconsin ====
In Wisconsin, the state has allowed both parents to be on the birth certificate, but refuses to change the wordage from "father and mother" to a gender-neutral "parent 1 and parent 2." In another case, a couple was outright rejected in their request. A federal lawsuit has been filed challenging this refusal. There is also a state lawsuit, Torres v. Rhoades, challenging the birth certificate wordage. On November 4, a judge dismissed Torres because the couple initiated the case as an adoption, but the judge ruled they did not properly attack the constitutionality of the statutes that used the term "father and mother" or "husband and wife." On November 17, the Second District Court of Appeal in Wisconsin agreed with the lower court. The couple could now appeal the case to the Supreme Court of Wisconsin or they could go back to the trial court with a case challenging the constitutionality of the statutes that require the terms "father and mother."

== Additional sources ==
- Ball, Carlos A. (2012). The Right to Be Parents: LGBT Families and the Transformation of Parenthood. New York University Press. ISBN 978-0814739303.
- Eilperin, Juliet (July 11, 2013). "Another front in the gay rights battle". The Washington Post.
