= Wright v. Arkansas =

- No. 60CV-13-2662
- Court: Arkansas Circuit Court, Pulaski County
- Decided: May 15, 2014
- Citation: 2014 WL 1908815

Case history
- Prior actions: Stay denied sub. nom. Wright v. Smith, No. CV-14-414 (Ark. Sup. Ct. May 14, 2014); initial opinion entered, (Ark. Cir. Ct., Pulaski Co., May 9, 2014).
- Subsequent actions: Stay ordered sub. nom. Smith v. Wright, No. CV-14-427 (Ark. Sup. Ct. May 16, 2014).

Holding
- This opinion, clarifying a May 9, 2014 opinion nunc pro tunc, finds Arkansas law (including constitutional law, statutory law, and regulations) to the extent it prohibits same-sex marriage as violating U.S. Constitutional guarantees.

Court membership
- Judges sitting: Chris Piazza, C.J.

Wright v. Arkansas is a same-sex marriage case in the Arkansas courts. An Arkansas Circuit Court judge ruled the Arkansas Constitution's ban on same-sex marriage unconstitutional on May 9, 2014. He clarified his opinion to include state statutes that interfered with allowing or recognizing same-sex marriage as well. The state Supreme Court issued a stay in the case on May 16, 2014, but approximately 450 same-sex marriage licenses were issued before the stay went into effect.

== Initial proceedings ==
On July 2, 2013, a group same-sex couples filed a state lawsuit challenging Arkansas Constitution Amendment 83's definition of marriage and its denial of recognition to same-sex unions established in other jurisdictions. It named nine state officials and several country clerks as defendants. They claimed violations of their rights to privacy, due process, and equal protection, as well noncompliance with the Full Faith and Credit Clause. After additional plaintiffs joined the suit, the plaintiffs were 20 couples, some of whom had married in Iowa, Massachusetts, or Canada, some of whom were registered as domestic partners in Eureka Springs and one in California, and some of whom had been denied marriage licenses by county clerks in Arkansas. Two of the couples sued on behalf of three children as well.

Wright v. Arkansas was assigned to state Circuit Judge Chris Piazza. Wright survived a motion to dismiss on December 12, 2013. On February 26, 2014, the plaintiff couples filed a motion for summary judgment. at the conclusion of oral arguments on April 17, Judge Piazza announced his intention to rule on that motion within two weeks.

== Circuit court ruling ==
On May 9, 2014, Judge Piazza ruled in Wright v. Arkansas, granting the plaintiffs' motion for summary judgment and striking down Arkansas's same-sex marriage ban. He wrote: "The exclusion of same-sex couples from marriage for no rational basis violates the fundamental right to privacy and equal protection ... The difference between opposite-sex and same-sex families is within the privacy of their homes." Judge Piazza did not act on an initial motion for a stay on the implementation of his decision.

The next day, May 10, was a Saturday when county offices are typically closed, but several clerks' offices were open because Arkansas was in its early voting period for an upcoming primary. The first same-sex marriage license was issued that morning in Eureka Springs. On Monday, May 12, more counties, including the state's most populous county, Pulaski, which includes Little Rock, begin issuing licenses.

Arkansas Attorney General Dustin McDaniel, who had announced his support for same-sex marriage on May 3, said that he would appeal the ruling.

== Appeal and stay ==
Attorney General McDaniel filed an appeal of the ruling on May 10 and submitted a petition for an emergency stay to the Arkansas Supreme Court on May 12. In the petition, the state defendants noted that the U.S. Supreme Court had issued a stay in Herbert v. Kitchen and urged the court to follow that precedent. A group of Arkansas county clerks also filed a petition for a stay, claiming that while Piazza's ruling overturned the state's constitutional same-sex ban, it did not address the state's statutory ban, causing confusion and uncertainty.

The plaintiff same-sex couples responded, arguing that the defendants' petition for a stay was premature because the circuit court had not yet acted on the initial stay, and that any confusion for the clerks should be remedied by a motion to clarify and correct the initial order, not a stay. On the appeal issue, the plaintiffs argued that while Judge Piazza's order granted them declaratory judgment, it had not addressed the issue of injunctive relief, therefore it was not a final order and could not be appealed.

On May 14, 2014, the Arkansas Supreme Court found that Judge Piazza's order was not a final one and that it therefore lacked jurisdiction to hear the appeal, which was premature. The Court denied the request for a stay, noting that the circuit court's order left in place Arkansas's statutory ban on same-sex marriage, Ark. Code Ann. § 9-11-208(b).

On May 12, former Governor Mike Huckabee called on Governor Mike Beebe to call a special session of the legislature to impeach Piazza. He wrote: "Judge Chris Piazza, a circuit court judge in my home state of Arkansas, decided that he is singularly more powerful than the 135 elected legislators of the state, the elected Governor, and 75% of the voters of the state. Apparently he mistook his black robe for a cape and declared himself to be 'SUPER LAWMAKER!'" Several legislators advocated impeachment as well, but Republican House Speaker Davy Carter said that "Trying to impeach a judge because you don't like his or her decision notwithstanding the subject matter is absurd and goes against hundreds of years of the way our great country has conducted business under our three branches of government".

== Clarification of the circuit court opinion ==
Once the Arkansas Supreme Court noted that Judge Piazza's order was silent about the state statutory same-sex marriage ban, all of the state's county clerks stopped issuing marriage licenses to same-sex couples. On May 15, the Wright plaintiffs filed a motion for clarification of judgment with Judge Piazza. Defendants did not object to clarification, but sought a final order, and renewed their demand for a stay.

Judge Piazza issued his clarified order the same day. In it, he criticized the defense for appealing the case to the state Supreme Court on a non-business day, in violation of court rules. The judge said "[I]t is and was the intent of the Order to grant Plaintiffs' Motion for Summary Judgment without exception and as to all injunctive relief requested therein. In fact, this was the expressly stated title of the May 9, 2014, Order." He granted the plaintiff same-sex couples a permanent injunction preventing the state from enforcing the constitutional ban against same-sex marriage as well as "all other state and local laws and regulations identified ... or otherwise in existence to the extent they do not recognize same-sex marriages validly contracted outside Arkansas, prohibit otherwise qualified same-sex couples from marrying in Arkansas or deny same-sex married couples the rights, recognition and benefits associated with marriage in the State of Arkansas."

On May 15, the judge entered his clarification and denied the state's motion for a stay. The state filed a notice of appeal immediately.

== Supreme Court activity ==
On May 16, without comment, the state Supreme Court stayed Piazza's ruling pending appeal, preventing the issuance of additional marriage licenses to same-sex couples. On August 6, the Attorney General's office asked the court to stay proceedings pending the resolution of Herbert v. Kitchen, noting that Utah officials had just asked the U.S. Supreme Court to review that case in which the Tenth Circuit Court of Appeals had found Utah's ban on same-sex marriage unconstitutional.

On August 4, the plaintiff same-sex couples moved to have any Supreme Court justice who was running for re-election recuse himself from the case. They cited a resolution by the state legislature calling on the court to uphold the state's ban and comments by legislators that voters should be allowed to recall judges as "intimidation tactics". The court denied the request on September 4.

On October 7, the plaintiffs filed their brief in the case, citing actions by the U.S. Supreme Court the day before, including its refusal to hear Kitchen, and asking the court to hear oral arguments. On October 9, the court denied Attorney General Dustin McDaniel's request, now outdated, to suspend proceedings pending the outcome of other cases. The court on October 14 granted the request for oral arguments. The court heard oral arguments on November 20.

The Court did not issue an opinion in the six weeks before the end of 2014, an unprecedented delay. The Court's membership changed with the new year, and a delay of several more weeks is anticipated, possibly even the rescheduling of oral arguments. On January 23, 2015, state Attorney General Leslie Rutledge requested a rehearing based on the change in the court's membership: "Two Associate Justices were not seated on the Arkansas Supreme Court when the first oral argument was held in November 2014, and Chief Justice Hannah was absent due to a national meeting of chief justices." On February 5, the court asked for briefs on the question of which judges should consider the case. On May 7, the Supreme Court ruled that the justices now serving on the court should consider the case. It denied any further role to the special justice appointed by the governor in 2014 to serve in place of a justice who had recused himself, given that the term of the recused justice had ended and the new justice elect to his seat was prepared to participate in the case.

The court never issued an opinion before the Supreme Court of the United States declared in Obergefell v. Hodges that the constitution guarantees the right to marry to same-sex couples. The same day, the Arkansas Supreme Court dismissed the appeal in Wright.

On November 11, 2015, former Justice Donald Corbin, one of the original justices to hear the case, revealed that the Court had voted 5–2 to strike down the state's marriage ban in 2014. Corbin stated that he wrote a majority opinion finding that Arkansas' ban on same-sex marriage violates both the Arkansas and U.S. Constitutions. Corbin urged the other justices to issue the opinion before the end of his term in 2014, but for unstated reasons, the ruling was never issued. Instead, the court waited for the Supreme Court to decide another case on the same issue, and dismissed Wright as moot.

== See also ==
- LGBT rights in Arkansas
- Same-sex marriage in Arkansas
