= Daniel Kemp =

Daniel Kemp may refer to:

- Daniel Kemp (actor) (1927–2000), American actor
- Daniel S. Kemp (1936–2020), American organic chemist
- Dan Kemp (footballer) (born 1999), English footballer

== See also ==
- John Dan Kemp (born c. 1951), Arkansas Supreme Court Chief Justice
