= List of first minority male lawyers and judges in Arkansas =

This is a list of the first minority male lawyer(s) and judge(s) in Arkansas. It includes the year in which the men were admitted to practice law (in parentheses). Also included are other distinctions such as the first minority men in their state to graduate from law school or become a political figure.

== Firsts in Arkansas' history ==
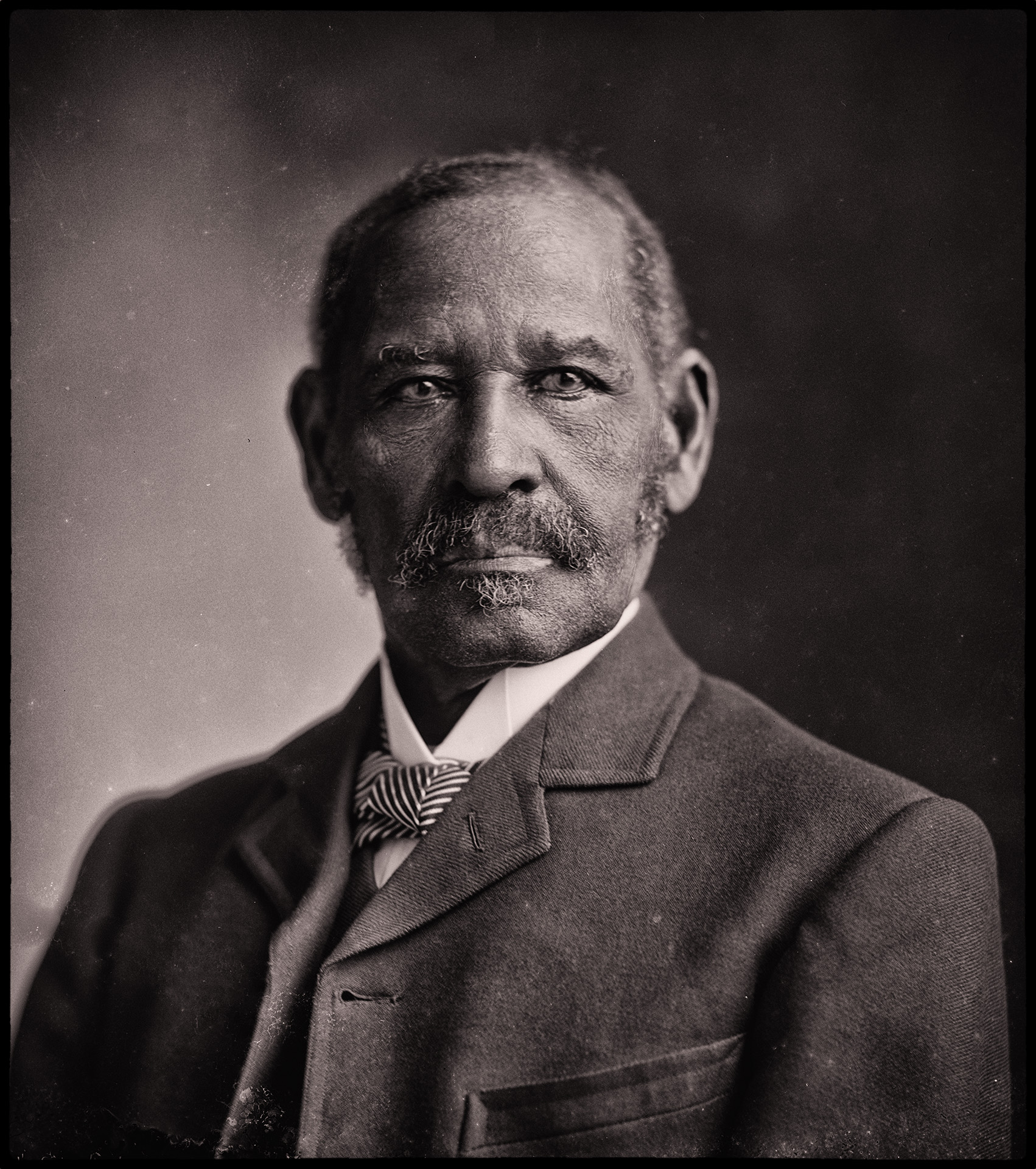
Mifflin Wistar Gibbs: First African American male judge in Arkansas (1873)

=== Lawyers ===
- First African American male: Thomas P. Johnson (1866)
- First African American male to join a major Arkansas law firm: Wendell L. Griffen in 1984

=== State judges ===
- First African American male (justice of the peace): John Milo Alexander
- First African American male: Mifflin Wistar Gibbs in 1873
- First African American male (Arkansas Supreme Court): George Howard Jr. (1954) in 1977
- First African American male (Arkansas Court of Appeals): George Howard Jr. (1954) in 1979
- First African American male (Eleventh Judicial District Court): Jesse Kearney (1979) in 1988
- First African American male (county court): Henry "Hank" Wilkins IV in 2017

=== Federal judges ===
- First Jewish American male (U.S. District Court for the Eastern District of Arkansas): Jacob Trieber in 1900
- First African American male (U.S. District Courts for the Eastern and Western Districts of Arkansas): George Howard Jr. (1954) in 1980
- First African American male (Chief Judge; U.S. Court of Appeals for the Eighth Circuit in Arkansas): Lavenski Smith (1987) in 2017

=== Attorney General of Arkansas ===
- First African American male: Leon Johnson in 2003

=== Assistant Attorney General ===
- First African American male: Rob Morehead

=== Arkansas Bar Association ===
- First African American male admitted: Wiley A. Branton, Sr. (1952)
- First African American male (president): Eddie Haywood Walker Jr. in 2015

== Firsts in local history ==
- Henry "Hank" Wilkins IV: First African American male to serve as a county court judge in Jefferson County, Arkansas (2017)
- Guillermo Hernández: First Latino American male lawyer to practice immigration law in Little Rock [Pulaski County, Arkansas]
- Silas Herbert Hunt: First African American male admitted to the University of Arkansas School of Law (1948)
- Chris Mercer and George W.B. Haley: Among the "six pioneers" who integrated the University of Arkansas School of Law (1949)
- Joseph Wood: First African American male judge in Washington County, Arkansas (2016)

== See also ==
- List of first minority male lawyers and judges in the United States

== Other topics of interest ==
- List of first women lawyers and judges in the United States
- List of first women lawyers and judges in Arkansas
