= Courtney Goodson =

Courtney Goodson may refer to:

- CoCo Goodson (born 1990), American soccer defender
- Courtney Hudson Goodson (born 1973), justice of the Arkansas Supreme Court
