= Sarah Shields =

American lawyer

Sarah Shields was Arkansas' first female lawyer. Shields graduated from the University of Kentucky Law School and completed her postgraduate work at the Cumberland School of Law in Tennessee On January 28, 1918, Shields became the first female to be called to the Arkansas Bar Association. She married attorney Thomas Cal (T.C.) Jobe and stopped practicing law when the couple moved to Washington whereupon Jobe was elected to the U.S. Senate. She died on January 23, 1983.

== See also ==
- List of first women lawyers and judges in Arkansas
