= Wiley A. Branton =

American civil rights lawyer (1923–1988)

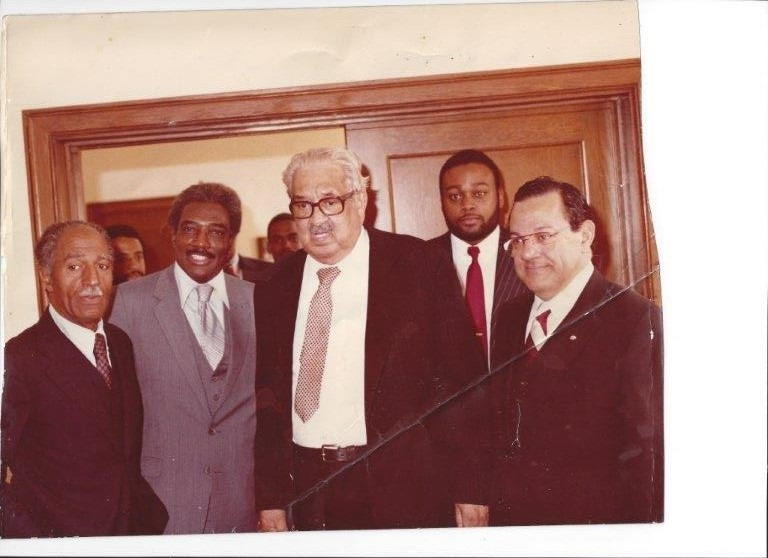
WIley A. Branton (far right) with Thurgood Marshall

Wiley Austin Branton (1923–1988) was a prominent civil rights lawyer and activist from Arkansas. Branton rose to prominence after filing the suit against the Little Rock School Board which would eventually be heard before the Supreme Court. After the trial, Branton moved to Atlanta, Georgia, where he acted as the executive director of the Voter Education Project. He then spent time working for the government as the executive director of for the President's Council on Equal Opportunity and as a lawyer for the Department of Justice. He also served as the Dean of Howard University School of Law for five years.

== Early life ==
Branton was born December 13, 1923, in Pine Bluff, Arkansas. His mother, Pauline, was a teacher and his father, Leo, operated a taxi business. Despite growing up with certain material comforts, Branton was still required to attend segregated primary and secondary schools before enrolling in Arkansas Agricultural, Mechanical, and Normal College. Branton managed his father's company during his time in school. In 1943, his education was temporarily paused when he was drafted into the United States Army. By the end of World War II, Branton had earned the position of master sergeant in an Engineer Aviation Battalion. His time in the military was critical to his developing understanding of injustice in the world.

After returning home, Branton inherited his father's business and resumed his studies. He graduated with a degree in business administration in 1950. That same year, Branton became the fifth black student to be admitted to the University of Arkansas School of Law. Branton had helped with integrationist efforts at the School of Law by influencing Silas Hunt to become the first black student to enroll at the university in protest after Governor Ben Laney began to campaign for a separate, segregated graduate school for black students. Upon graduating in 1953, he became the third black student to earn his law degree at the university. Branton would go on to open his own law office in Pine Bluff which would be in operation from 1953 to 1962. In his personal affairs, Branton married Lucille McKee in 1948 and the couple had six children during their union.

== Civil rights and legal career ==
Branton had joined his local branch of the NAACP shortly after his return home from war. His first effort in partnership with the group would be a voter registration campaign. The goal of the campaign was to teach black Americans how to properly mark their ballots. His activism led to an arrest and conviction for violating Arkansas election laws. He was fined $300 which the local black community paid off as a sign of solidarity and support.

As a lawyer, Branton was able to partner with the organization to bring cases against those who violated the rights of black southerners. In 1956, Branton alongside NAACP director Thurgood Marshall filed a suit against the Little Rock, Arkansas, school board due to the school's refusal to desegregate despite the Supreme Court's Brown v. Board of Education decision. The Little Rock suit filed by Branton, Cooper v. Aaron, was heard by the Supreme Court in 1958 and led to the desegregation of Central High School. Branton and his family received many threats and had crosses burned on their lawn while the case was being heard.

He later held the position of the executive director of the Southern Regional Council's voter education project in Atlanta.

In 1965 Brandon relocated to Washington DC where he worked as the executive secretary on the Council on Equal Opportunity, an initiative of the Johnson administration.

== See also ==
- List of first minority male lawyers and judges in Arkansas
