= 2004 Arkansas Amendment 3 =

Referendum to ban same-sex marriage

Amendment 3
- November 2, 2004
- “A proposed amendment to the Arkansas Constitution providing that marriage consists only of the union of one man and one woman; that legal status for unmarried persons which is identical or substantially similar to marital status shall not be valid or recognized in Arkansas, except that the Legislature may recognize a common law marriage from another state between a man and a woman; and that the Legislature has the power to determine the capacity of persons to marry, subject to this amendment, and the legal rights, obligations, privileges, and immunities of marriage.”

Results
Choice	Votes	%
For	753,770	74.95%
Against	251,914	25.05%
Valid votes	1,005,684	95.33%
Invalid or blank votes	49,261	4.67%
Total votes	1,054,945	100.00%
Registered voters/turnout	1,686,124	62.47%
- County results Yes 80–90% 70–80% 60–70%

Constitutional Amendment 3 of 2004, is an amendment to the Arkansas Constitution that makes it unconstitutional for the state to recognize or perform same-sex marriages or civil unions. The referendum was approved by 75% of the voters.

== Contents ==
The text of the amendment states:

Marriage. Marriage consists only of the union of one man and one woman.

1. Marital status. Legal status for unmarried persons which is identical or substantially similar to marital status shall not be valid or recognized in Arkansas, except that the legislature may recognize a common law marriage from another state between a man and a woman.
2. Capacity, rights, obligations, privileges, and immunities. The legislature has the power to determine the capacity of persons to marry, subject to this amendment, and the legal rights, obligations, privileges, and immunities of marriage.

== Results ==
Amendment 3
Choice	Votes	%
For	753,770	74.95
Against	251,914	25.05
Total	1,005,684	100.00
Registered voters/turnout	1,969,208	51.07

== May 2014 Court Ruling on Amendment 3 and Arkansas Statutes ==
On May 9, 2014, Sixth Judicial Circuit Judge Chris Piazza ruled the ban on same-sex marriage in the state of Arkansas was unconstitutional, which legalized same-sex marriage in the state. Previously same-sex marriage was banned by both state statute and the state constitution in Arkansas. Subject to court stays and appeals.

== See also ==
- LGBT rights in Arkansas
