= List of first women lawyers and judges in Arkansas =

This is a list of the first women lawyer(s) and judge(s) in Arkansas. It includes the year in which the women were admitted to practice law (in parentheses). Also included are women who achieved other distinctions such becoming the first in their state to graduate from law school or become a political figure.

== Firsts in Arkansas' history ==
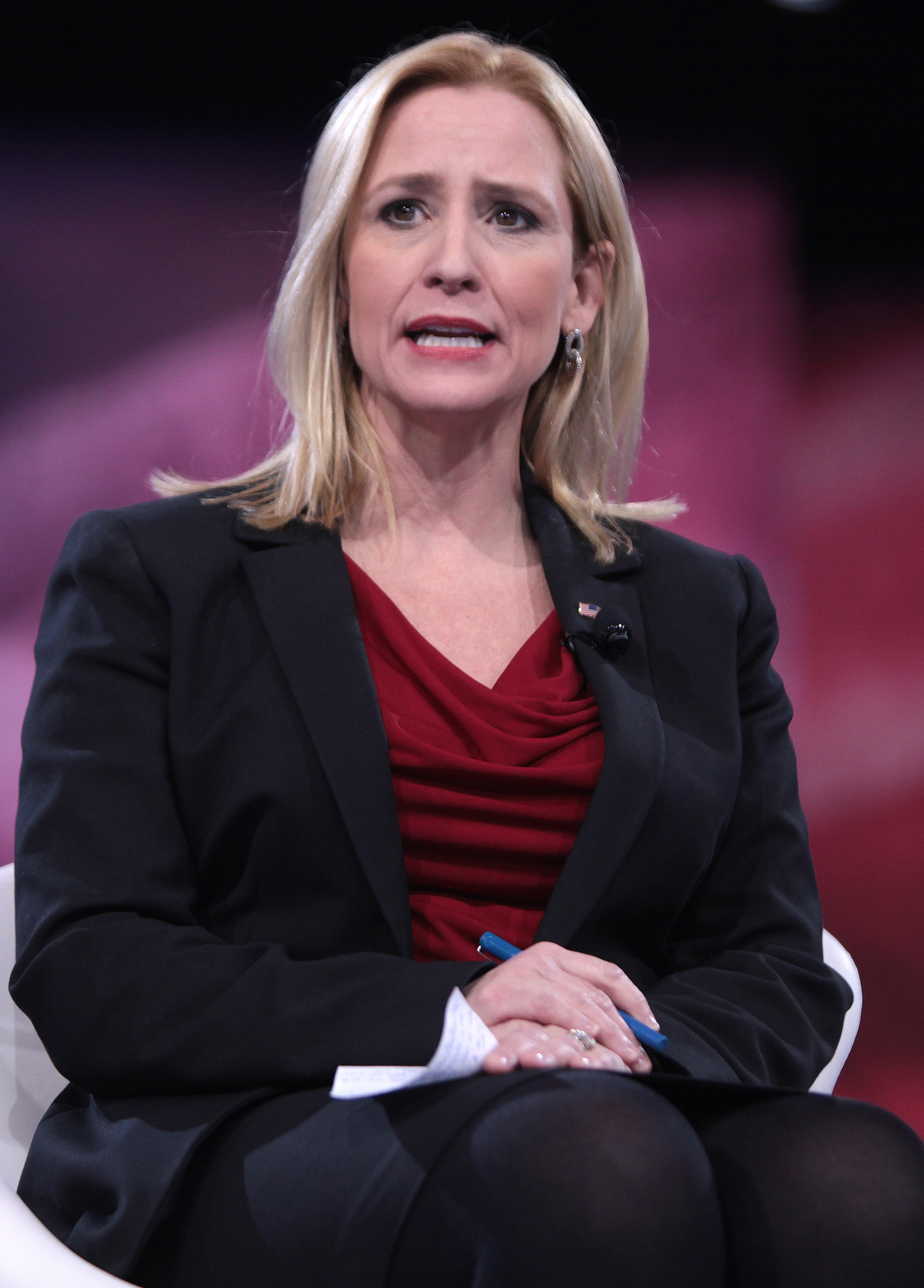
Leslie Rutledge: First female elected as the Attorney General for Arkansas (2015)

=== Degree ===
- First female (master's degree in judicial studies): Cindy Thyer in 2019

=== Lawyers ===
- First female: Sarah Shields (1918)
- First African American female: Sharon E. Bernard Miller (1970)
- First Vietnamese American (female): Niki T. Cung (1996)

=== Law Clerk ===
- First (African American) female to clerk for the Arkansas Supreme Court: Joyce Williams Warren (1976) in 1977

=== State judges ===
- First female: Elsijane Trimble Roy (1939)
- First female (Sixth Judicial District): Elsijane Trimble Roy (1939) in 1966
- First female (Arkansas Supreme Court): Elsijane Trimble Roy (1939) from 1975-1977
- First African American female: Joyce Williams Warren (1976) in 1989
- First African American female (First Circuit): Kathleen Bell in 1988
- First African American female (Arkansas Supreme Court): Andree Layton Roaf (1979) circa 1995-1996
- First female (Arkansas Court of Appeals): Marian Penix in 1979
- First female (Interim Chief Justice; Arkansas Supreme Court): Betty Dickey (1985) in 2004
- First female (Third Judicial Circuit): Michelle Huff in 2019
- First female (Chief Justice; Arkansas Supreme Court): Karen R. Baker in 2025

=== Federal judges ===
- First female (U.S. District Court for the Western District of Arkansas): Elsijane Trimble Roy (1939) in 1977

=== Lieutenant Governor of Arkansas ===
- First female (elected): Leslie Rutledge in 2023

=== Attorney General of Arkansas ===
- First female: Mary Stallcup in 1991
- First female (elected): Leslie Rutledge in 2015

=== Assistant Attorney General of Arkansas ===
- First female: Virginia Darden Moose

=== Prosecuting Attorney ===
- First female elected: Betty Dickey in 1995

=== Arkansas Bar Association ===
- First female (president): Carolyn Witherspoon in 1995

== Firsts in local history ==
- Betty Dickey: First female to be elected as a Prosecuting Attorney for the Eleventh Judicial District [Arkansas, Jefferson and Lincoln Counties, Arkansas; 1995]
- Carol Crews: First female Prosecuting Attorney for the Twentieth Judicial District, Arkansas [Faulkner, Searcy and Van Buren Counties, Arkansas; 2018]
- Michelle Huff: First female appointed as a Judge of the Third Judicial Circuit in Arkansas (2019) [Jackson, Lawrence, Randolph and Sharp Counties, Arkansas]
- Stephanie Black: First female Prosecuting Attorney for the Eighth Judicial District, Arkansas [Lafayette and Miller Counties, Arkansas; 2015]
- Georgia Kimbro Elrod: First female lawyer in Benton County, Arkansas (1974)
- Ruth LaVerne Grayson: First female county judge in Boone County, Arkansas
- Kim Bridgeforth: First female judge in Jefferson County, Arkansas
- Pauline LaFon Gore (1936): First female lawyer in Texarkana, Arkansas [Miller County, Arkansas]
- Cathy Hardin Harrison: First elected female county judge in Miller County, Arkansas (2019)
- Maud Crawford (1927): First female lawyer in Camden, Arkansas [Ouachita County, Arkansas]
- Joyce Williams Warren (1976): First African American female judge in Pulaski County, Arkansas (1988)
- Barbara Webb: First female circuit judge in Saline County, Arkansas (2017)
- Stacy Leeds: First Native American (Cherokee) female to become the Dean of the University of Arkansas Law School [Washington County, Arkansas]
- Suzanne Lighton: First female lawyer in Washington County, Arkansas

== See also ==
- List of first women lawyers and judges in the United States
- Timeline of women lawyers in the United States
- Women in law

== Other topics of interest ==
- List of first minority male lawyers and judges in the United States
- List of first minority male lawyers and judges in Arkansas
