= Jim Hannah =

American judge

Chief Justice Arkansas Supreme Court
- In office 2005 – September 1, 2015
- Preceded by: Betty Dickey
- Succeeded by: Howard W. Brill

Associate Justice Arkansas Supreme Court Position 5
- In office 2001–2005
- Preceded by: Lavenski R. Smith
- Succeeded by: Betty Dickey

Chancery Judge 17th District
- In office 1979–1999

Personal details
- Born: December 26, 1944 Long Beach, California
- Died: January 14, 2016 (aged 71) Searcy, Arkansas
- Spouse: Pat Hannah
- Education: University of Arkansas (BSBA, JD)

James Robert Hannah (December 26, 1944 – January 14, 2016) was an American jurist. After attending college and law school at the University of Arkansas in Fayetteville, Hannah opened a private law practice in Searcy. He practiced law for a decade, entering public service in part-time city attorney and city judge roles in small towns across the Arkansas Grand Prairie. He won election as Chancery Judge of the 17th District in 1979, and held the position until 1999, when he was nominated to the Arkansas Supreme Court. He served as an associate justice for four years, becoming chief justice in 2005. Hannah held the top position for ten years, until resigning in 2015.

== Early life ==
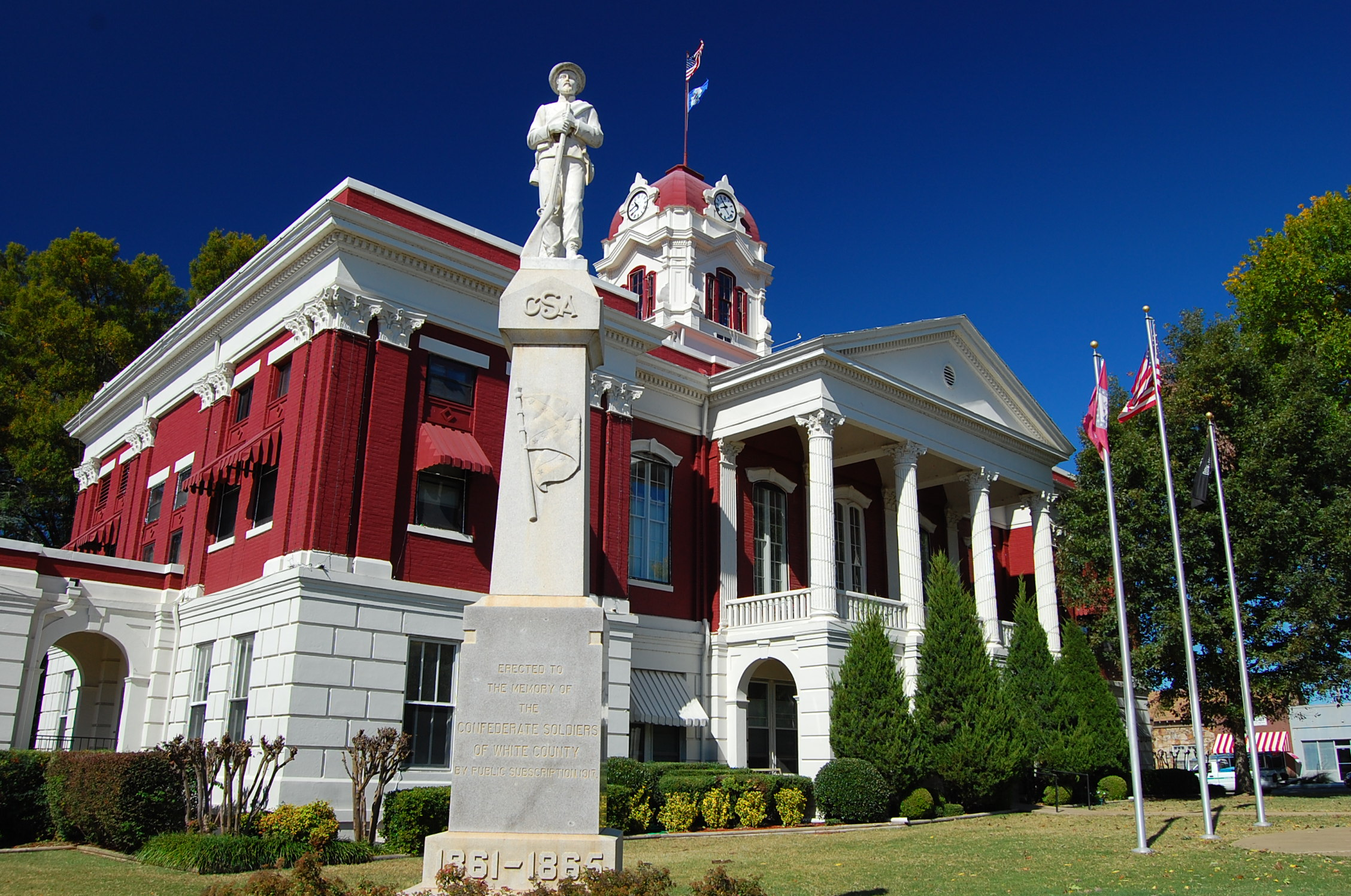
White County Courthouse in Searcy

Born in the Naval Hospital in Long Beach, California, while his father was in the United States Navy during World War II. His family moved back to Ozark, Missouri, where they operated a dry cleaning business. Hannah moved with his parents to Harrison, Arkansas, in 1960, where his family operated a soft-drink bottle company. Hannah graduated from Harrison High School in 1962. Hannah briefly attended Drury University. Hannah then received his bachelor's degree in accounting from School of Business Administration at the University of Arkansas and his Juris Doctor degree from University of Arkansas School of Law. He practiced law in Searcy, Arkansas.

Hannah operated a private law practice in Searcy for ten years. Over the years, Hannah worked as the city attorney for several White County municipalities, including Searcy, and as city judge of Kensett and Rose Bud. He also served as deputy prosecuting attorney of Woodruff County. In 1978, Hannah was elected chancery and probate judge, winning reelection until 1999.

== Supreme Court ==
Seal of the Supreme Court of Arkansas

=== Chief Justice ===
Hannah was elected as the chief justice of the Arkansas Supreme Court in 2004, 2008, and 2012. As Chief Justice, Hannah swore in several state officials, including governors Mike Beebe and Asa Hutchinson and Arkansas Secretary of State Mark Martin. In 2011, he presided over oral arguments at the University of Arkansas School of Law in Fayetteville, almost 50 years after earning a JD from the institution. It was only the twelfth time the court heard oral arguments outside Little Rock. (Note: Permitted per Amendment 80 to the Arkansas Constitution, adopted in 2000.) Under Hannah, the Arkansas Supreme Court became the first in the nation to make its electronic record its official record, and installed cameras to stream oral arguments in 2010.

During Governor Beebe's administration, Hannah was often cited as an instrumental supporter of the criminal justice reform later passed by the Beebe administration.

During Wright v. Arkansas, a contentious case regarding the state's same-sex marriage ban, Hannah and Associate Justice Paul Danielson accused fellow justices of obstructing the judicial process. Hannah and Danielson recused themselves from the ensuing obstruction lawsuit, with Governor Hutchinson appointing Brett Watson of Searcy to replace Hannah for the case.

Hannah retired effective September 1, 2015 due to health concerns. Governor Asa Hutchinson appointed Howard W. Brill to complete Hannah's term. He died in Searcy on January 14, 2016, aged 71.

== Judicial philosophy ==
Under our system of federalism, the courts of the states are no less protectors of freedom than the federal courts. To the contrary, on a state level we deal more directly with the day-to-day lives of our citizens.

— Jim Hannah, Albany Law Review

Hannah was interested in federalism, and the role state supreme courts play in citizen's daily lives. He sat on The Reemergence of State Constitutional Law and the State High Courts in the 21st Century panel discussion at the inaugural State Constitutional Commentary Symposium sponsored by the Albany Law Review in 2007, and later published an article in the journal. He was nominated to the board of directors of the State Justice Institute by President Barack Obama in 2010, and was renominated in 2012.

== Board service ==
- Chairman and President, Conference of Chief Justices
- Board of Directors, State Justice Institute
- Past President, Board of the Arkansas Judicial Council
- Past Chairman, Arkansas Judicial Resources Assessment Committee,
- Past Chairman, Arkansas Judicial Resources Legislative Committee,
- Past Chairman, Arkansas Judicial Resources Retirement Committee
- Co-chair, Conference of Chief Justices Committee of Families and Courts
- U.S. Supreme Court Judicial Conference Committee on Federal-State Jurisdiction
- Arkansas Supreme Court Committees on Technology, Child Support, and Foster Care

== Notes ==
Political offices
Preceded by Betty Dickey	Chief Justice; Arkansas Supreme Court; 2005–September 1, 2015	Succeeded by Howard W. Brill
Preceded by Lavenski R. Smith	Associate Justice; Arkansas Supreme Court; Position 5; 2001–2005	Succeeded by Betty Dickey
Preceded by	Chancery Judge; 17th District; 1979–1999	Succeeded by
