= Intrastate Commerce Improvement Act =

The Intrastate Commerce Improvement Act is a 2015 Arkansas act that prohibits, with exception to employees of a local government, any county, municipality, or other political subdivision of the state from adopting or enforcing an ordinance, resolution, rule, or policy that creates a protected classification or prohibits discrimination on a basis not contained in state law.

== Background ==
On August 20, 2014, the Fayetteville City Council passed an ordinance prohibiting discrimination on the basis of sexual orientation or gender identity in public and private employment, housing, and public accommodations.

On December 9, 2014, Fayetteville voted 51.66% in favor of repealing the ordinance.

== Legislative history ==
This bill was sponsored by state senator Bart Hester. On February 9, 2015, Arkansas State Senate passed, with 24 voting in favor, 8 voting against, and 2 not voting, SB 202. On February 13, 2015, the Arkansas House of Representatives passed, with a 58 in favor, 21 voting against, 14 not voting, and 7 voting present, SB 202. On February 24, 2015, SB 202 became Act 137 without the signature of Governor Asa Hutchinson. On July 22, 2015, Act 137 went into effect.

== Response ==
Map of Arkansas cities that have sexual orientation anti–employment discrimination ordinances Sexual orientation and gender identity with anti–employment discrimination ordinance Sexual orientation and gender identity solely in public employment Sexual orientation in public employment Does not protect sexual orientation and gender identity in employment

On February 9, 2015, the Eureka Springs City Council voted 5-0 in favor of Ordinance 2223, an ordinance prohibiting discrimination on the basis of sexual orientation or gender identity in public and private employment, housing, and public accommodations.

On April 21, 2015, the Little Rock Board voted 7-2 to prohibit discrimination on the basis of sexual orientation or gender identity in public and private employment, housing, and public accommodations.

On June 16, 2015, the Fayetteville City Council passed Ordinance 5781, an ordinance prohibiting discrimination on the basis of sexual orientation or gender identity in public and private employment, housing, and public accommodations.

On September 1, 2015, Arkansas Attorney General Leslie Rutledge issued a statement on Fayetteville's Ordinance 5781 on the reviewed ordinances was in conflict with Act 137 and unenforceable.

On September 8, 2015, Fayetteville voted 52.77% in favor of Ordinance 5781.

=== Protect Fayetteville v. City of Fayetteville ===
On March 1, 2016, Washington County Circuit Judge Doug Martin ruled that the Fayetteville, Arkansas was allowed to enforce Ordinance 5781. The ruling was based on the Fayetteville City Attorney's argument that state law provided protections based on sexual orientation and gender identity in sections other than the state's anti-discrimination code, making the city's ordinance legally enforceable. Martin stated, "Clearly, the classifications of gender identity and sexual orientation were classifications of persons protected on bases contained in state law prior to the enactment of (Fayetteville's ordinance)." Martin did not, however, rule on the ultimate constitutionality of Fayetteville's ordinance. Fayetteville attorneys predicted that the ordinance would be featured in an Arkansas Supreme Court ruling in the future.

On February 23, 2017, the Arkansas Supreme Court ruled in a 7-0 ruling that Ordinance 5781 of Fayetteville, Arkansas violated the Intrastate Commerce Improvement Act "by extending discrimination laws in the City of Fayetteville to include two classifications (sexual orientation and gender identity) not previously included under state law, thus creating a direct inconsistency between state and municipal law." The Arkansas Supreme Court sent the case back to the Washington County judge who upheld Fayetteville's ordinance. Attorney General Leslie Rutledge, whose office had asked the court to uphold the state law, said she was grateful for the court's ruling.

== See also ==
- LGBT rights in Arkansas
- State bans on local anti-discrimination laws in the United States
