= Pauline LaFon Gore =

Mother of Al Gore (1912–2004)

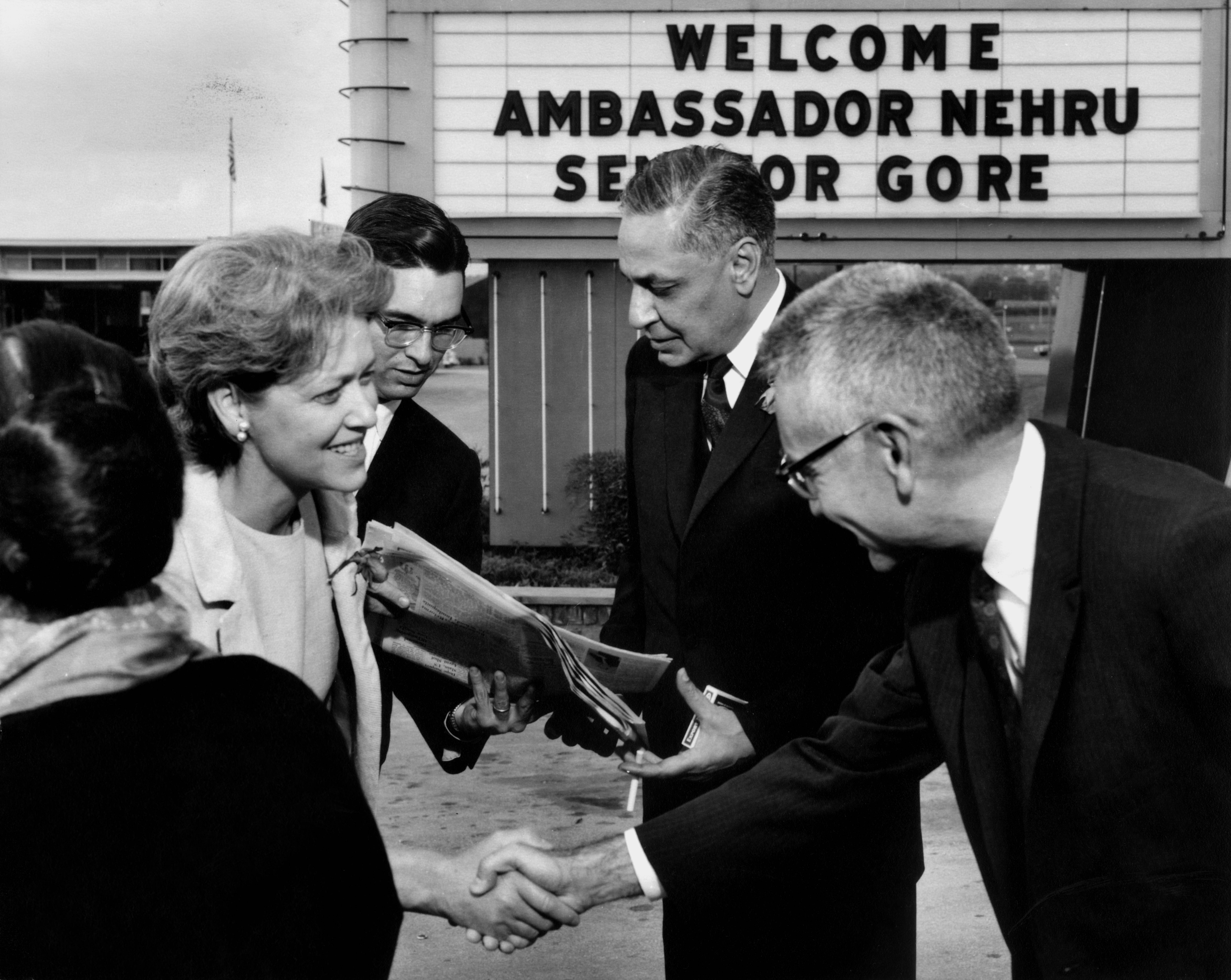
- Gore (left) in 1963
- Born: Pauline LaFon; October 6, 1912; Palmersville, Tennessee, U.S.
- Died: December 15, 2004 (aged 92); Carthage, Tennessee, U.S.
- Education: Union University, Tennessee; Vanderbilt University (LLB)
- Spouse: Albert A. Gore (m. 1937; died 1998)
- Children: 2, including Albert Jr.
- Parent(s): Walter L. LaFon (father); Maude Galtin (mother)

Pauline LaFon Gore (née LaFon; October 6, 1912 – December 15, 2004) was the mother of former United States Vice President Albert Arnold Gore Jr. and the wife of former United States Senator Albert A. Gore. She is credited with playing a significant role in both of their careers with Al Gore Sr. saying "there will never be a better campaigner than Pauline LaFon Gore". Her advice was an important factor in his refusal to sign the "Southern Manifesto" opposing desegregation and his opposition to the Vietnam War which were critical issues in his bid for re-election as a Senator in 1970. She came from a poor family in small business to become one of the first female lawyers to graduate from Vanderbilt University and managed a Washington law firm in the 1970s.

== Early life ==
She was born in Palmersville, Tennessee in 1912 as one of six children. Her parents, Maude (née Gatlin) and Walter L. LaFon, ran a general store. When her father was injured, the family moved to Jackson, Tennessee, where her father worked for the Tennessee highway department.

Despite the fact that her family was struggling and it was the Great Depression, Pauline LaFon was determined to graduate from college and waited on tables in order to pay her way. From 1931 to 1933, she attended Union University, but did not earn a degree from that institution until nearly seven decades later where she was granted an honorary degree. In 1936, she became the 10th woman to graduate from Vanderbilt University Law School.

She met Albert Gore Sr. while waiting tables at the Andrew Jackson Hotel while he was studying for a law degree as well as farming and acting as the Commissioner for Schools. They ended up studying together for the bar exam where Pauline LaFon obtained a higher mark than Gore Sr.

Following graduation from Vanderbilt, she practiced law in Texarkana, Arkansas for a year before returning to Tennessee and married Albert Gore Sr on April 17, 1937. She practiced in oil and gas law and also divorce law, being one of the first women to practice law in those fields.

== Political wife 1937–1970 ==
Al Gore Sr. was a rising man in the Tennessee political system when he married Pauline LaFon. He was appointed State Labor Commissioner later the same year and was elected to Congress a year later. The Gores' elder child Nancy LaFon Gore Hunger was born in 1938 as well.

When Al Gore Sr., was elected to Congress in 1938, it was traditional for political wives to stay in the background and not play an active role in their husbands' political lives. However, she took Eleanor Roosevelt as a role model and actively stumped for Gore's first campaign speaking at clubs and extensively canvassing in the rural parts of the electorate.

Pauline Gore would play an active role in all of her husband's campaigns as his closest adviser. In 1952, Albert Gore Sr., ran for the Senate standing in the Democratic primary against Kenneth McKellar, who was the powerful chair of the Senate Appropriarions Committee. Due to his position, McKellar was in a strong position to win funding for Tennessee. In order to remind voters of his access in Washington, McKellar used the slogan "The thinking fellar votes McKellar". In order to counter this slogan, Pauline Gore suggested placing signs with the slogan "Think some more and vote for Gore" close by McKellar's signs. Albert Gore Sr. won the primary in what was an upset and the tactic played an important part in the victory.

The Gores' second child, Al Gore Jr., was born on March 31, 1948. During his childhood, the family would live in Washington for much of the year and return to the family home in Carthage, Tennessee for the summer. Al Gore often referred to her as his "greatest teacher". Pauline Gore was influential in many committees of Senators' wives when she was in Washington.

During Albert Gore Sr's career as a Senator, Pauline Gore was one of his closest advisers. Her views were influential in Al Gore's decision not to sign the "Southern Declaration on Integration" opposing desegregation issued in 1956 by all but three southern Senators. Al Gore Sr. was briefly a candidate for the Democratic nomination as Vice-President but bowed out in favour of fellow Tennessee Senator Estes Kefauver who was nominated. Later on, she advised her husband to oppose the Vietnam War, which was highly controversial in the electorate.

== Lawyer, mother, and grandmother 1970–2004 ==
After the defeat of her husband, Pauline Gore resumed her law career in Washington. Her husband joined with her in establishing a law firm together. She later became the managing partner of Peabody, Rivlin, Gore, Claudous and Brashares, a large law firm in Washington, and became a mentor to young women starting their legal careers.

Al Gore Jr. ran for election to Congress in 1976, and Pauline Gore campaigned for him. She would help in most of his campaigns, although she would not play as active a role in his political career as she did in her husband's career. She also offered counsel to Phil Bredesen, later mayor of Nashville.

She campaigned for Al Gore Jr. in 1988 in his unsuccessful bid to become the Democratic nominee for President. In 1992, she joined her husband in campaigning for the Clinton-Gore ticket on a seven-week bus trip across the United States with many visits to senior citizens' clubs.

She had a mild stroke in 1993 and had a heart attack in 1995. Albert Gore Sr. died on December 5, 1998. After receiving a humanitarian award in 1998, she established a scholarship fund for residents of Smith County, Tennessee to enable poor people from that county to attend college. In 1999, the Vanderbilt University law school named her as its Distinguished Alumna for the year, the first woman to be so honored. She died in her sleep at her home in Carthage on December 15, 2004.

== See also ==
- List of first women lawyers and judges in Arkansas
