= Lavenski Smith =

American judge (born 1958)

Vence Smith
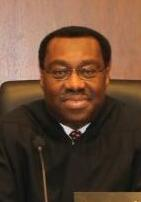
- Smith in 2011

Chief Judge of the United States Court of Appeals for the Eighth Circuit
- In office March 11, 2017 – March 10, 2024
- Preceded by: William J. Riley
- Succeeded by: Steven Colloton

Judge of the United States Court of Appeals for the Eighth Circuit
- Incumbent
- Assumed office July 19, 2002
- Appointed by: George W. Bush
- Preceded by: Richard S. Arnold

Associate Justice of the Arkansas Supreme Court
- In office 1999–2000
- Appointed by: Mike Huckabee
- Preceded by: David Newbern
- Succeeded by: Jim Hannah

Personal details
- Born: Lavenski Roy Smith; 1958 (age 67–68) Hope, Arkansas, U.S.
- Party: Republican
- Education: University of Arkansas (BA, JD)

Lavenski Roy "Vence" Smith (born 1958) is an American lawyer who served as a judge of the United States Court of Appeals for the Eighth Circuit. He was chief judge from 2017 to 2024. He previously served as an associate justice of the Arkansas Supreme Court from 1999 to 2000. He is currently a judge on the Eighth Circuit.

== Education ==
Smith is a native of Hope, Arkansas, and graduated from Hope High School. He completed a Bachelor of Arts degree at the University of Arkansas in 1981, and a Juris Doctor degree at the University of Arkansas School of Law in 1987.

== Career ==
Before joining the federal bench, Smith worked in both private practice and public service. He was in private practice in Arkansas from 1985 to 1987, From 1987 to 1991, Smith was a staff attorney at Ozark Legal Services. He then returned to private practice in Springdale, Arkansas from 1991 to 1994. From 1994 to 1996 he was an assistant professor at John Brown University in Siloam Springs. Smith served as a regulatory liaison with the Arkansas Governor's Office from 1996 to 1997 and then chaired the Arkansas Public Service Commission from 1997 to 1999.

Smith was an unsuccessful Republican candidate for the Arkansas Court of Appeals in 1998. Notably, Arkansas Governor Mike Huckabee had appointed Smith as an associate justice of the Arkansas Supreme Court in 1999, a role he held until 2000.

At one point, Smith was an executive director of the Rutherford Institute.

=== Federal judicial service ===
On September 4, 2001, he was nominated to the United States Court of Appeals for the Eighth Circuit by President George W. Bush. He was confirmed by the United States Senate on July 15, 2002 by voice vote. He served as chief judge from 2017 to 2024. In October 2022, Smith was appointed by U.S. Supreme Court Chief Justice John Roberts to serve as the newest chair of the Judicial Conference's executive committee. His appointment took effect on October 1, 2022.

== See also ==
- List of African-American federal judges
- List of African-American jurists

Legal offices
Preceded by David Newbern	Associate Justice of the Arkansas Supreme Court; 1999–2000	Succeeded by Jim Hannah
Preceded by Richard S. Arnold	Judge of the United States Court of Appeals for the Eighth Circuit; 2002–present	Incumbent
Preceded by William J. Riley	Chief Judge of the United States Court of Appeals for the Eighth Circuit; 2017–2024	Succeeded by Steven Colloton
