= Paul Danielson =

American judge

Paul E. Danielson

Associate Justice of the Arkansas Supreme Court
- In office 2006 – December 31, 2016
- Preceded by: Betty Dickey
- Succeeded by: Shawn Womack

Personal details
- Born: 1945 (age 80–81)
- Spouse: Betsy Danielson
- Children: 1
- Education: Florida State University; University of Arkansas

Paul E. Danielson (born c. 1945) is a former Arkansas Supreme Court justice serving from 2006 to 2016. He was previously the Circuit Judge for Arkansas's 15th Judicial Circuit.

== Education ==
Paul Danielson received his bachelor's degree from Florida State University in 1968 and a law degree from the University of Arkansas School of Law.
