= Shawn Womack =

American judge (born 1972)

Associate Justice of the Arkansas Supreme Court
- Incumbent
- Assumed office January 1, 2017
- Preceded by: Paul Danielson

Member of the Arkansas Senate from the 1st district
- In office January 2003 – January 2009
- Succeeded by: Johnny Key

Member of the Arkansas House of Representatives from the Baxter County district
- In office January 1999 – January 2003

Personal details
- Born: August 13, 1972 (age 54) Shawnee, Kansas, U.S.
- Party: Republican
- Spouse: Melinda Womack
- Education: University of Central Arkansas (BA); University of Arkansas (JD)

Shawn Womack (born August 13, 1972) is an American lawyer and judge serving as an associate justice of the Arkansas Supreme Court. He is formerly a circuit court judge for the 14th Judicial District of Arkansas. Earlier, Womack served from 2001 to 2009 as a state senator for District 1, which includes his own Baxter County. During part of his Senate tenure, Womack was the Senate Minority Leader. From 1999 to 2003, he was a member of the Arkansas House of Representatives.

A native of Shawnee, Kansas, Womack, a licensed attorney, owns the Womack Law Firm in Mountain Home, Arkansas. In the legislature he was chairman of the Joint Budget Committee, the Desegregation Litigation Oversight Committee, and the Desegregation Lawsuit Resolution Task Force. He was the vice-chairman of the Senate Judiciary Committee and was formerly chairman of the Legislative Task Force on District Courts and the Litigation Reports Oversight Committee. He sits on the Member Council of State Government's Legal Task Force, which is responsible for reviewing briefs before submissions to the United States Supreme Court.

He has been recognized by the Arkansas District Judges Council, Arkansas State University, the Arkansas Prosecuting Attorneys Association, the AARP, the Arkansas Volunteer Lawyers for the elderly, the Arkansas Municipal Police Association, the Arkansas Environmental Federation, the American Heart Association, and the Arkansas Judicial Council. The American Family Association of Arkansas gave him an 80% evaluation.

In October 2018, Womack was among seven judges accused of violating judicial rules in dealing with lower court judge Wendell Griffen. A month later, an eight-member panel of the Judicial Discipline and Disability Commission dismissed the charges.

Womack graduated from Mountain Home High School, the University of Central Arkansas in Conway with a Bachelor of Business Administration and Accounting, and the University of Arkansas School of Law at Fayetteville. Womack is a member of Kappa Sigma fraternity (Nu-Kappa/University of Central Arkansas).

Womack is married to Melinda, and the couple has two children.

Legal offices
Preceded by Paul Danielson	Associate Justice of the Arkansas Supreme Court; 2017–present	Incumbent
