= Courtney Rae Hudson =

American judge (born 1973)

Courtney Hudson

Associate Justice of the Arkansas Supreme Court Position 2
- Incumbent
- Assumed office January 1, 2025
- Preceded by: J. Cody Hiland

Associate Justice of the Arkansas Supreme Court Position 3
- In office January 1, 2011 – December 31, 2024
- Preceded by: Elana Wills
- Succeeded by: J. Cody Hiland

Personal details
- Born: Courtney Rae Hudson; 1973 (age 52–53) Harrison, Arkansas, U.S.
- Spouses: Mark Henry (m. 1996; div. 2010); John Goodson (m. 2011; div. 2019)
- Education: University of Arkansas at Fayetteville (BA, JD)

Courtney Rae Hudson (born 1973) is an American lawyer who has served an associate justice of the Arkansas Supreme Court. She was elected to the position in 2010.

== Education ==
Hudson graduated Phi Beta Kappa and magna cum laude from the University of Arkansas at Fayetteville with a Bachelor of Arts in 1994. She graduated with high honors from the University of Arkansas School of Law in 1997.

== Early career ==
After law school, Hudson was a law clerk for Judge Terry Crabtree and Judge Frank Aery, both of the Arkansas Court of Appeals. In 2008, she was elected to the Arkansas Court of Appeals.

== Elections ==
=== 2010 ===
Hudson defeated Crittenden County Circuit Court Judge John Fogleman for the Position 3 Associate Justice position. The election was for an eight-year term. During the campaign, former President Bill Clinton and former Arkansas 3rd Representative John Paul Hammerschmidt supported Hudson.

The election saw hundreds of thousands of dollars spent by dark money groups attempting to defeat Hudson, making it the most expensive Supreme Court election in Arkansas history to that point. Hudson won by a 57% to 43% margin.

=== 2016 ===
Hudson sought the Chief Justice position in November 2016 shortly after the announcement of Howard W. Brill as interim chief justice. She was able to maintain her Position 3 seat while running for chief justice. Stone County Circuit Court Judge John Dan Kemp won the seat by a 58–42 margin.

=== 2018 ===
Seeking reelection, Hudson won the most votes in a three-way non-partisan judicial election on May 22, 2018. A runoff election was held between Hudson and David Sterling in November 2018. Hudson won the runoff by a 56% to 44% margin.

== Personal life ==
Hudson was married to John Goodson of Texarkana, Arkansas, an attorney, political donor, and member of the University of Arkansas Board of Trustees. She divorced Mark Henry, her husband of 14 years, shortly after winning election to the Arkansas Supreme Court. On August 27, 2019, Goodson was granted a divorce decree and henceforth will revert to her maiden name, Courtney Rae Hudson.
