= Betty Dickey =

American judge (born 1940)

Interim Chief Justice of the Arkansas Supreme Court
- In office 2004–2005

Personal details
- Born: Betty Clark; February 23, 1940 (age 86) Black Rock, Arkansas, U.S.
- Education: University of Arkansas (BA); University of Arkansas at Little Rock (JD)

Betty Clark Dickey (born February 23, 1940) is the first woman to serve as the chief justice of the Arkansas Supreme Court.

She was born in Black Rock, Arkansas on February 23, 1940, to Millard and Myrtle Clark. Dickey earned her Bachelor's degree (1962) and Juris Doctor (1985) from the University of Arkansas at Fayetteville and Little Rock respectively. She initially worked as an educator before learning about the law in the office of her former husband Jay Dickey, Jr., Esq. In 1985, Dickey was admitted to practice law in Arkansas. She served as an Assistant City Attorney for Pine Bluff, Arkansas and the City Attorney for Redfield, Arkansas while developing her own private practice.

On January 5, 2004, then Governor Mike Huckabee appointed Dickey as the interim Chief Justice of the Supreme Court of Arkansas. Prior to the appointment, Dickey had served as staff attorney for the Soil and Water Conservation Committee, prosecuting attorney for the Eleventh Judicial District and chief legal counsel in the Governor's Office. Although Dickey was appointed on an interim basis, she was the first woman in the court's history to serve as chief justice. Her successor, Jim Hannah, was elected to the position in November 2004 following a special election and Dickey stepped down on January 1, 2005. Governor Huckabee thereafter appointed Dickey to serve the remainder of Hannah's term as an associate justice of the Arkansas Supreme Court, and she remained on the bench until December 2006. In 2018, Dickey was appointed as a liaison for Preferred Family Healthcare.

== See also ==
- List of first women lawyers and judges in Arkansas
- List of justices of the Arkansas Supreme Court
- Arkansas Supreme Court

Party political offices
Preceded by Dan Ivy	Republican nominee for Arkansas Attorney General; 1998	Vacant Title next held by Gunner DeLay
Political offices
Preceded by W. H. "Dub" Arnold	Justice of the Arkansas Supreme Court; 2004–2006	Succeeded by James Hannah
