= Same-sex marriage in Arkansas =

Same-sex marriage has been legal in Arkansas since the U.S. Supreme Court's landmark decision in Obergefell v. Hodges on June 26, 2015, striking down same-sex marriage bans nationwide. Previously, same-sex marriage was briefly legal in Arkansas for a period beginning on May 9, 2014, as a result of a ruling in Wright v. Arkansas by Sixth Judicial Circuit Judge Chris Piazza striking down the state's constitutional and statutory bans on same-sex marriage as violating the U.S. Constitution. Approximately 541 same-sex couples received marriage licenses in several counties before the Arkansas Supreme Court stayed his ruling pending appeal on May 16. On November 25, 2014, Judge Kristine Baker of the U.S. District Court for the Eastern District of Arkansas struck down Arkansas' ban on same-sex marriage in Jernigan v. Crane. She stayed her ruling pending appeal. Following the Obergefell ruling, same-sex couples began obtaining marriage licenses in Arkansas and the appeal in Jernigan was dismissed by the Eighth Circuit Court of Appeals.

Arkansas had previously denied marriage rights to same-sex couples by statute since 1997 and in its State Constitution since 2004. Polling suggests that a narrow majority of Arkansas residents support the legal recognition of same-sex marriage, with a 2024 Public Religion Research Institute poll showing that 50% of respondents supported same-sex marriage.

== Legal restrictions ==
=== Statutes ===
In 1997, the Arkansas General Assembly passed a statute banning same-sex marriage and the recognition of same-sex marriages performed out of state. The bill was signed into law by Governor Mike Huckabee. The ban was struck down by the U.S. Supreme Court in Obergefell v. Hodges on June 26, 2015. Arkansas' statutory prohibition on same-sex marriage, though unenforceable, remains on the books and has not been explicitly repealed.

=== Constitutional amendment ===
On November 2, 2004, Arkansas voters approved Amendment 3, a state-initiated constitutional amendment that prohibited the recognition of same-sex marriage, as well as anything "identical or substantially similar to marital status" in the state of Arkansas. On June 27, 2013, a day after the U.S. Supreme Court ruling in United States v. Windsor, Arkansans for Equality submitted proposed language for a 2014 ballot measure that would repeal the state's constitutional ban on same-sex marriage. On July 9, 2013, a different group, the Arkansas Initiative for Marriage Equality (AIME), which was formed in November 2012, submitted to the Arkansas Attorney General proposed language for the Arkansas Marriage Equality Amendment, (Note: The text submitted read: Be it enacted by the people of the State of Arkansas: Section 1. The right to marry shall not be abridged or denied on account of sex or sexual orientation. Section 2. No member of the clergy or religious organization shall be required to provide accommodations, advantages, facilities or privileges related to the solemnization or celebration of marriage. The refusal to do so shall not create any civil claim or cause of action.) a similar ballot measure but instead for the 2016 ballot. Attorney General Dustin McDaniel rejected the proposal for the 2014 ballot on July 12 and again on August 12, and the proposal for the 2016 ballot on September 18 and October 7, each time citing problems with the wording. On September 19, he accepted the proposal for the 2014 ballot and on November 7, he accepted the one for the 2016 ballot. Both initiatives, however, were eventually not placed on the ballot.

== Lawsuits ==
Same-sex marriage in the United States

=== Wright v. Arkansas ===
On July 2, 2013, eleven same-sex couples, some of whom had married in Iowa and some of whom were registered as domestic partners in Eureka Springs, filed a lawsuit in state court challenging the Arkansas Constitution's ban on same-sex marriage. On May 9, 2014, Judge Chris Piazza struck down the constitutional ban and did not stay his ruling. The Arkansas Supreme Court refused to issue a stay because Piazza's ruling was preliminary, and some counties issued marriage licenses to same-sex couples. Judge Piazza clarified his order to enjoin enforcement of state statutes as well, freeing county clerks from statutory restrictions on issuing licenses to same-sex couples. More counties began issuing licenses.

On May 16, 2014, the Arkansas Supreme Court stayed Piazza's ruling pending appeal. On October 7, the original plaintiffs filed a petition for summary judgment citing actions by the U.S. Supreme Court the day before and asked for expedited consideration, which the court granted. The court heard oral arguments on November 20. In an unprecedented move, the Supreme Court did not rule before the close of its term in 2014. Instead, two new justices ended up joining the court after two justices had their terms end, causing the justices to question who should participate. The court never issued an opinion before Obergefell was decided, mooting Wright. On November 11, 2015, former Justice Donald L. Corbin, one of the original justices to hear the case, revealed that the court had voted 5–2 to strike down the same-sex marriage ban in 2014. Corbin said he had written a majority opinion finding that Arkansas' ban on same-sex marriage violated both the Arkansas and U.S. constitutions. Corbin urged the other justices to issue the opinion before the end of his term in 2014, but for unstated reasons, the ruling was never issued. Instead, the court waited for the Supreme Court to decide another case on the same issue, and dismissed Wright as moot.

=== Jernigan v. Crane ===
On July 15, 2013, two lesbian couples filed a federal same-sex marriage lawsuit, Jernigan v. Crane, in the U.S. District Court for the Eastern District of Arkansas. One plaintiff couple sought a marriage license from Arkansas, while another couple asked to have their New York marriage recognized. The lead named defendant was the Pulaski County clerk, being sued in his official capacity for denying marriage licenses, with the other defendants being Governor Mike Beebe and Attorney General McDaniel. On January 31, 2014, the county and state defendants filed a motion to dismiss the suit. On July 16, 2014, the plaintiffs filed a motion for summary judgment. Judge Kristine Baker heard oral arguments on November 20. On November 25, Baker ruled for the plaintiffs and stayed her ruling pending appeal. Judge Baker found that the state's ban on same-sex marriage violated the plaintiffs' fundamental right to marry, requiring justification under the strict scrutiny standard. She also ruled that a ban on same-sex marriage is a form of sex discrimination, which is therefore reviewed under the standard known as heightened scrutiny. She rejected the plaintiffs' contention that the ban violated their right to travel and that it constituted discrimination on the basis of sexual orientation. Baker wrote:

This Court does not take lightly a request to declare that a state law is unconstitutional. Statutes are passed by the duly elected representatives of the people. It is not on a whim that the Court supplants the will of the voters or the decisions of the legislature. Even so, these interests do not address any specific reasons for the marriage laws at issue; instead, they represent the type of generalized, post hoc, and litigation-reactive justifications that strict scrutiny disallows. [...] The Court reminds [the defendants] that the Constitution is also an expression of the people's will, and these rationales contradict the very fabric and structure of the Constitution's protections of individual rights against majoritarian and governmental overreach. The fact that Amendment 3 was adopted by referendum does not immunize it from federal constitutional scrutiny. [...] A most searching examination of [the defendants'] proposed reasons for Arkansas's marriage laws reveals that these laws are not narrowly tailored to achieve a compelling state interest. The bases [the defendants] suggest for upholding Amendment 3 and the challenged statutes, primarily encouraging procreation and ensuring the best interests of children, in addition to the laws' mismatched means, do not withstand strict scrutiny. This Court finds that the principal purpose of Amendment 3 and the challenged statutes "is to impose inequality, not for other reasons like governmental efficiency." Therefore, this Court denies [the defendants'] motion to dismiss and grants plaintiffs' motion for summary judgment as to plaintiffs' claim that the Arkansas laws at issue deny consenting adult same-sex couples their fundamental right to marry in violation of the Due Process Clause and the Equal Protection Clause of the Fourteenth Amendment to the United States Constitution.

Attorney General McDaniel said that before deciding whether to appeal the decision he would confer with Leslie Rutledge, who was due to succeed him as attorney general in January 2015. The state filed a notice of appeal in the Eighth Circuit on December 23. The Eighth Circuit stayed proceedings on April 29, 2015, pending the Supreme Court's resolution of Obergefell v. Hodges. On June 26, 2015, the U.S. Supreme Court ruled that same-sex marriage bans violate the Due Process and Equal Protection clauses of the Fourteenth Amendment. The decision legalized same-sex marriage nationwide in the United States, including in Arkansas. Immediately following the ruling, same-sex couples began obtaining marriage licenses in Arkansas. All counties in the state announced their intention to comply, expect Cleburne, Van Buren and Yell counties, which refused to issue marriage licenses to same-sex couples until relenting on June 29.

Governor Asa Hutchinson responded to the ruling by stating, "Today the Supreme Court in a 5-4 decision requires the State of Arkansas to recognize same-sex marriage. This decision goes against the expressed view of Arkansans and my personal beliefs and convictions. While my personal convictions will not change, as Governor I recognize the responsibility of the state to follow the direction of the U.S. Supreme Court. As a result of this ruling, I will direct all state agencies to comply with the decision." Attorney General Rutledge said she was "disappointed" but "[t]he justices have issued a decision, and that decision must be followed." Rutledge instructed state agencies and county clerks to comply with the Supreme Court ruling. State tax authorities began allowing married same-sex couples to submit joint tax returns, and government employers that allow spouses of married employees to enroll in employee benefits programs, such as health insurance, began allowing the same-sex spouses of employees to enroll as well. Subsequently, the Eighth Circuit dismissed the appeal in Jernigan and affirmed the district court's decision on August 11, 2015.

=== Frazier-Henson v. Walther ===
On February 13, 2015, two same-sex couples in "window marriages", married in May 2014 while a state court's order enjoining enforcement of the state's same-sex marriage ban was in force, brought suit in state court seeking to require the state to recognize their marriages. They named three state officials as defendants. They asked the court to rule on behalf of all same-sex couples married in May. State Judge Wendell Griffen ruled on June 9, 2015 in Frazier-Henson v. Walther that the 541 same-sex marriages conducted between May 9 and May 16 were valid.

== Developments after legalization ==
On February 2, 2017, a resolution urging the U.S. Congress to adopt a federal constitutional amendment banning same-sex marriage was introduced to the Arkansas General Assembly. The measure, sponsored by 21 Republican lawmakers, was first rejected by the Arkansas Senate on February 20 in a 17–7 vote, falling one vote short of the 18 required for passage. However, the vote was later expunged, and on February 28 the Senate reconsidered the measure, this time approving it by 18–9. On March 8, a House subcommittee recommended that the Arkansas House of Representatives adopt the resolution, but on March 14 the House rejected it in a 29–41 vote. All 29 members in favor were Republicans, while opposition came from 20 Democrats and 21 Republicans.

On March 6, 2017, Representative Stephen Meeks introduced a bill to the General Assembly to reenact the state's same-sex marriage ban. The bill would have thus been in violation of the U.S. Constitution. It was withdrawn by Meeks on March 14.

== Demographics and marriage statistics ==
Data from the 2000 U.S. census showed that 4,423 same-sex couples were living in Arkansas. By 2005, this had increased to 5,890 couples, likely attributed to same-sex couples' growing willingness to disclose their partnerships on government surveys. Same-sex couples lived in all counties of the state, and constituted 0.7% of coupled households and 0.4% of all households in the state. Most couples lived in Pulaski, Washington and Benton counties, but the counties with the highest percentage of same-sex couples were Carroll (0.77% of all county households) and Madison (0.59%). Same-sex partners in Arkansas were on average younger than opposite-sex partners, and more likely to be employed. However, the average and median household incomes of same-sex couples were lower than different-sex couples, and same-sex couples were also far less likely to own a home than opposite-sex partners. 30% of same-sex couples in Arkansas were raising children under the age of 18, with an estimated 2,778 children living in households headed by same-sex couples in 2005.

The 2020 U.S. census showed that there were 4,133 married same-sex couple households (1,688 male couples and 2,445 female couples) and 3,661 unmarried same-sex couple households in Arkansas.

== Domestic partnerships ==
The small town of Eureka Springs in Carroll County is the only incorporated city in Arkansas to allow domestic partnerships (since 2007) and health care coverage for the domestic partners of city workers (since 2011). On November 12, 2012, the Eureka Springs City Council endorsed marriage for same-sex couples, becoming the first city in Arkansas to do so.

== Public opinion ==
Public opinion for same-sex marriage in Arkansas
Poll source	Dates administered	Sample size	Margin of error	Support	Opposition	Do not know / refused
Public Religion Research Institute	February 28 – December 8, 2025	167 adults	?	50%	46%	4%
Public Religion Research Institute	March 13 – December 2, 2024	238 adults	?	50%	46%	4%
Public Religion Research Institute	March 9 – December 7, 2023	171 adults	?	49%	47%	4%
Public Religion Research Institute	March 11 – December 14, 2022	?	?	51%	47%	2%
Public Religion Research Institute	March 8 – November 9, 2021	?	?	47%	52%	1%
Public Religion Research Institute	January 7 – December 20, 2020	439 adults	?	58%	37%	5%
Public Religion Research Institute	April 5 – December 23, 2017	641 adults	?	52%	38%	10%
University of Arkansas	October 12–22, 2017	801 adults	± 3.5%	35%	57%	8%
Public Religion Research Institute	May 18, 2016 – January 10, 2017	1,008 adults	?	42%	50%	8%
University of Arkansas	October 18–27, 2016	800 adults	± 3.5%	33%	57%	10%
Public Religion Research Institute	April 29, 2015 – January 7, 2016	782 adults	?	37%	57%	6%
University of Arkansas	October 19–25, 2015	800 adults	± 3.5%	29%	63%	8%
Public Religion Research Institute	April 2, 2014 – January 4, 2015	549 adults	?	36%	59%	5%
Edison Research	November 4, 2014	?	?	26%	69%	5%
New York Times/CBS News/YouGov	September 20 – October 1, 2014	1991 likely voters	± 2.6%	32%	54%	14%
Public Policy Polling	April 25–27, 2014	840 registered voters	± 3.4%	27%	63%	10%
New York Times/Kaiser Family Foundation	April 8–15, 2014	857 registered voters	?	35%	57%	8%
Greenberg Quinlan Rosner Research/Target Point Consulting	June 26–30, 2013	600 adults	± 4.9%	36%	55%	9%

== See also ==
- LGBT rights in Arkansas
- Same-sex marriage in the United States
