= 2008 Arkansas Act 1 =

Initiative Act 1
- November 4, 2008
- Unmarried Couple Adoption Ban

Results
Choice	Votes	%
Yes	586,248	57.07%
No	440,945	42.93%
Total votes	1,027,193	100.00%
County results
For
60–70%
50–60%
Against
50–60%

Arkansas Proposed Initiative Act No. 1 (2008) is an initiated state statute that was approved on November 4, 2008, election in Arkansas. This measure makes it illegal for any individuals cohabiting outside of a valid marriage to adopt or provide foster care to minors. While the measure was proposed primarily to prohibit same-sex couples from being adoptive or foster parents, this measure also applies to all otherwise qualified couples who are not legally married.

The statute was a response to the June 2006 Arkansas Supreme Court case Howard vs. Arkansas, which overturned a ban on gay adults becoming foster parents. The Arkansas-based Family Council Action Committee lobbied for state legislatures to respond to the case for several years before petitioning to add Act 1 to the November 2008 ballot.

On December 30, 2008, the ACLU filed suit in state court on behalf of 29 adults and children, challenging Act 1 as unconstitutional.

On April 16, 2010, the law was overturned by Circuit Court Judge Chris Piazza in the case Arkansas Department of Human Services v. Cole. His ruling was upheld unanimously by the Arkansas Supreme Court on April 7, 2011.

== Results ==
Arkansas Proposed Initiative Act No. 1 (2008)
Choice	Votes	%
For	586,248	57.07
Against	440,945	42.93
Total	1,027,193	100.00
Valid votes	1,027,193	94.46
Invalid/blank votes	60,243	5.54
Total votes	1,087,436	100.00
Registered voters/turnout		64.52

== See also ==
- LGBT rights in Arkansas
- LGBT adoption
