= John Dan Kemp =

American judge (born 1951)

Dan Kemp

Chief Justice of the Arkansas Supreme Court
- In office January 1, 2017 – December 31, 2024
- Preceded by: Howard W. Brill
- Succeeded by: Karen R. Baker

Personal details
- Born: John Dan Kemp Jr. September 8, 1951 (age 74) Batesville, Arkansas, U.S.
- Education: University of Arkansas, Fayetteville (BA, JD)

John Dan Kemp Jr. (born September 8, 1951) is an American lawyer who has served as the chief justice of the Arkansas Supreme Court since 2017.

== Biography ==
Born in Batesville, Arkansas, Kemp attended Mountain View High School and received his undergraduate degree from the University of Arkansas in 1973, followed by a Juris Doctor from the University of Arkansas School of Law in 1976. While attending the University of Arkansas, he was a member of the Gamma Upsilon chapter of Sigma Nu fraternity. Kemp was a city judge and city attorney in Mountain View before being elected as a circuit judge in Stone County, Arkansas in 1986, which position he held for 29 years.

=== Chief Justice of Arkansas ===
In 2015, Kemp decided to challenge sitting Justice Courtney Rae Hudson for the Chief Justice position. Kemp defeated Hudson to win the seat.

Legal offices
Preceded by Howard W. Brill	Chief Justice of the Arkansas Supreme Court; 2017–2025	Succeeded by Karen R. Baker
