= Arkansas Department of Human Services v. Cole =

- Court: Arkansas Supreme Court
- Full case name: The Arkansas Department of Human Services et al. v. Sheila Cole et al.
- Decided: April 7, 2011
- Citation: 2011 Ark. 145

Case history
- Prior actions: Law declared unconstitutional, injunction issued against enforcement

Holding
- The prohibition of unmarried couples from adoption infringed on the privacy rights of unmarried opposite, and same-sex couples found in the Arkansas Constitution.

Case opinions
- Majority: Brown joined by unanimous

Laws applied
- Articles II, Section II and XV of the Arkansas Constitution

Arkansas Department of Human Services v. Cole is a case decided by the Arkansas Supreme Court concerning the adoption rights of unmarried couples. On April 7, 2011, the Arkansas Supreme Court unanimously struck down Arkansas Act 1, passed by voters two and a half years earlier.

== Background ==
On November 4, 2008, Arkansas voters passed "Act 1" prohibiting unmarried couples from jointly adopting. The law disproportionately targeted gay couples, as they could not marry in the state at the time. On December 30, 2008, plaintiffs Sheila Cole amongst others filed a lawsuit in Pulaski County Circuit Court against the Arkansas Department of Human Services and others seeking to declare the statute unconstitutional. The plaintiffs contended that the act violated Articles 2, Section 2 and Section 15 of the Arkansas Constitution as well as the Fifth and the Fourteenth Amendment to the United States Constitution.

== Circuit Court Opinion and Appeal ==
On April 16, 2010, Judge Chris Piazza of Pulaski County Circuit Court struck down Act 1, ruling that it violated the Arkansas state constitutions' guarantee of right to privacy. Piazza cited Jegley v. Picado, a case decided by the Arkansas Supreme Court in 2002, which struck down the state's law prohibiting unmarried couples from sexual intercourse based on the right to privacy. On May 16, the judge entered the final order striking down Act 1, but stayed his ruling pending appeal.

== Arkansas Supreme Court ==
On April 7, 2011, the Arkansas Supreme Court unanimously affirmed the lower court's ruling. The court determined that the fundamental right to privacy was being infringed upon, and thus the court applied heightened scrutiny in finding Act 1 unconstitutional. Justice Robert L. Brown wrote the majority opinion, concluding that under the act, “the exercise of one’s fundamental right to engage in private, consensual sexual activity is conditioned on foregoing the privilege of adopting or fostering children. The choice imposed on cohabiting sexual partners, whether heterosexual or homosexual, is dramatic. They must choose either to lead a life of private, sexual intimacy with a partner without the opportunity to adopt or foster children or forego sexual cohabitation and, thereby, attain eligibility to adopt of foster.” The court, like the court below it, relied upon Jegley v. Picado in finding a fundamental right to privacy, which Act 1 infringed upon by forcing unmarried adults to choose between adopting children and that right.

The ruling had the effect of same-sex couples being able to adopt in Arkansas for the first time. Prior to the act, same-sex couples were not permitted to jointly adopt as state law did not allow for it. Thus, the ruling made Arkansas one of the first few states to recognize adoptions by same-sex couples.

Almost four years exactly after Judge Piazza struck down Arkansas' ban on adoption, he struck down the state's prohibition on same-sex marriage as well. His ruling was not affirmed by the state Supreme Court before the Supreme Court of the United States ruled Ohio's ban on same-sex marriage unconstitutional.
