= Howard W. Brill =

American judge (born 1943)

Chief Justice of the Arkansas Supreme Court
- In office September 2015 – December 2016
- Preceded by: James Hannah
- Succeeded by: John Dan Kemp

Personal details
- Born: October 18, 1943 (age 82) Englewood, New Jersey

Howard Walter Brill (born October 18, 1943) is a law professor and jurist who was the chief justice of the Arkansas Supreme Court, having been appointed to that position in September 2015 and serving until December 2016.

== Biography ==
Brill was born on October 18, 1943, in Englewood, New Jersey to Edwin Lois Brill Jr. and Catharine Linsmann Brill. The family later moved to Bennington, Vermont and then Daytona Beach, Florida, where Brill graduated from Seabreeze High School in 1961. Brill graduated from Duke University in North Carolina in 1965 with a degree in history and political science.

Following graduation, Brill joined the Peace Corps teaching English in a Boys School in Sokoto, Nigeria before leaving in December 1967 due to the Nigerian Civil War. In 1968, he matriculated at the University of Florida Levin College of Law in 1968, where he served as editor in chief of the University of Florida Law Review and was awarded a scholarship for his works and performance. He completed his Juris Doctor degree in 1970. While in law school, he met Katherine Price whom he later married; together they would have three children. While at the university, he was a write-in candidate for the seat of the forth Congressional District. He taught legal writing in both the University of Florida and the University of Illinois before obtaining a master of law degree.

Brill practiced law with a small firm in Rock Island, Illinois and has since taught law around the world including in Saint Petersburg, Russia, Cambridge, England and Kaunas, Lithuania.

When Chief Justice Jim Hannah retired before the end of his term due to cancer, Brill was appointed by Governor Asa Hutchinson to fill the position. Brill served from September 2015 until December 2016.

Brill has been a professor at the University of Arkansas School of Law since 1975. He has authored two books: Arkansas Law of Damages and Arkansas Professional and Judicial Ethics.

He has been appointed as a special justice by Bill Clinton and Mike Huckabee both while they were Governors of Arkansas.

Political offices
Preceded by James Hannah	Justice of the Arkansas Supreme Court; 2015–2016	Succeeded by John Dan Kemp
