= Chris Piazza =

American lawyer

Division 2 judge of the Arkansas Sixth Circuit
- Incumbent
- Assumed office 1990

Prosecuting attorney of the Arkansas Sixth Circuit
- In office 1985–1990
- Preceded by: W. C. Bentley
- Succeeded by: Mark Stodola

Personal details
- Party: Democratic (Non Partisan)

Christopher C. Piazza is a Division 2 judge of the Arkansas Sixth Circuit.

== Notable rulings ==
=== Wright v. Arkansas ===
On May 9, 2014, Piazza ruled the ban on same-sex marriage in the state of Arkansas was unconstitutional, which legalized same-sex marriage in the state.

=== Arkansas Department of Human Services v. Cole ===
On April 16, 2010, Piazza overturned Arkansas Act 1 in the case of Arkansas Department of Human Services v. Cole which makes it illegal for any individuals cohabiting outside of a valid marriage to adopt or provide foster care to minors. The ruling was upheld unanimously by the Arkansas Supreme Court on April 7, 2011.

== Electoral history ==
=== 1984 ===
Democratic primary election of Arkansas prosecuting attorney of the Arkansas Sixth Circuit, June 1984
Party	Candidate	Votes	%
Democratic	Chris Piazza	36,782	52.79
Democratic	Mark Stodola	32,891	47.21
Total votes		69,673	100

=== 1990 ===
Democratic primary election of Arkansas Circuit Judge, District 6, Division 2, May 29, 1990
Party	Candidate	Votes	%
Democratic	Chris Piazza	43,331	74.74
Democratic	John Choate	14,643	25.26
Total votes		57,974	100

General election of Arkansas Circuit Judge, District 6, Division 2, November 6, 1990
Party	Candidate	Votes	%
Democratic	Chris Piazza	43,206	50.11
Republican	Hayward Battle	22,786	26.43
No party preference	Henry Osterloh	20,226	23.46
Total votes		43,338	100

=== 2014 ===
Chris Piazza is running for re-election to the Sixth Circuit. He is running unopposed in the general election for the Sixth Circuit on May 20, 2014.

== Appointments ==
Piazza was appointed by Bill Clinton, during his time as Arkansas governor, to chair a panel that was drafting state ethics legislation. Due to this appointment, Piazza recused himself from a later case to disbar Clinton.
