= Susan Owens (disambiguation) =

Susan Owens (1949–2025) was an associate justice of the Washington Supreme Court. Other people with the same name include:

- Susie Owens (born 1956), American model and perfumer
- Susan Owens (academic) (born 1954), British professor of Environment and Policy
- Susan O. Hickey (born 1955), Chief United States District Judge of the United States District Court for the Western District of Arkansas.

== See also ==
- Susan Owen, American operatic soprano
