= John T. Shepherd =

American judge (born 1987)

John Thomas Shepherd
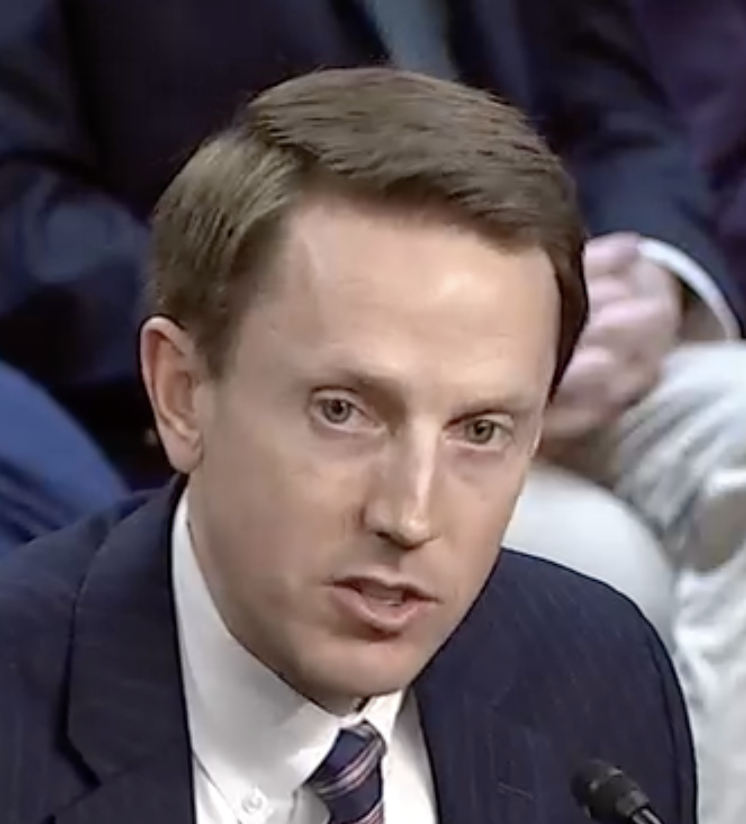

Judge of the United States District Court for the Western District of Arkansas
- Incumbent
- Assumed office April 23, 2026
- Appointed by: Donald Trump
- Preceded by: Susan O. Hickey

Personal details
- Born: John Thomas Shepherd; 1987 (age 38–39) El Dorado, Arkansas, U.S.
- Education: Rice University (BA); University of Arkansas (JD)

John Thomas Shepherd (born 1987) is an American lawyer who has served as a United States district judge of the United States District Court for the Western District of Arkansas since 2026. He previously served as a judge of the Arkansas 13th Judicial State Circuit Court in El Dorado, Arkansas from 2025 to 2026.

== Early life and education ==
Shepherd was born in 1987 in El Dorado, Arkansas. He received his Bachelor of Arts degree in 2009 from Rice University and his Juris Doctor, magna cum laude in 2013 from University of Arkansas School of Law. During his time at Rice, he played quarterback for the Rice Owls football team.

== Career ==
From 2025 to 2026, Shepherd has served as a judge of the Arkansas 13th Judicial State Circuit Court in El Dorado, Arkansas. He previously served as a prosecuting attorney in the same circuit.

=== Federal judicial service ===
On January 6, 2026, President Donald Trump announced his intention to nominate Shepherd to an unspecified seat on the United States District Court for the Western District of Arkansas. On January 29, 2026, Trump formally nominated Shepherd to the seat on the Western District of Arkansas being vacated by Judge Susan O. Hickey. On February 4, 2026, a hearing on his nomination was held before the Senate Judiciary Committee. On March 5, 2026, his nomination was reported from the Judiciary Committee by a 12–10 party-line vote. On April 13, 2026 the Senate invoked cloture by a 50–44 vote. The following day, the Senate confirmed his nomination in a 53–46 vote. He received his judicial commission on April 23, 2026.

Legal offices
Preceded by Susan O. Hickey	Judge of the United States District Court for the Western District of Arkansas; 2026–present	Incumbent
