= Conner Eldridge =

American politician (born 1977)

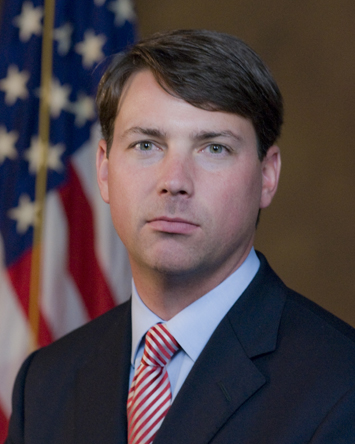
- Official portrait, 2012

United States Attorney for the Western District of Arkansas
- In office December 10, 2010 – August 21, 2015
- President: Barack Obama
- Preceded by: Deborah Groom (Acting)
- Succeeded by: Duane Kees

Personal details
- Born: William Conner Eldridge, Jr. September 9, 1977 (age 48) Fayetteville, Arkansas, U.S.
- Party: Democratic
- Spouse: Mary Elizabeth
- Children: William Eldridge Henry Eldridge Tull Eldridge
- Education: Davidson College (BA); University of Arkansas, Fayetteville (JD)

William Conner Eldridge Jr. (born September 9, 1977) is an American lawyer and politician who served as the United States Attorney for the Western District of Arkansas. He was the Democratic Party nominee for the 2016 U.S. Senate election in Arkansas.

== Personal life and education ==
Eldridge was born on September 9, 1977, in Fayetteville, Arkansas. He lived in Augusta, Arkansas for twelve years before moving to Lonoke, Arkansas, where he worked on his family's farm. After graduating from Lonoke High School, he earned a bachelor's degree from Davidson College in 1999. In 2003, he earned a Juris Doctor from the University of Arkansas, where he served on the law review.

Eldridge is a son-in-law of Ross Whipple, the former owner of Summit Bank. He and his wife, Mary Elizabeth, have three children.

== Career ==
Between 1999 and 2004, Eldridge served as a legislative correspondent for Senator Blanche Lincoln, a legislative assistant for Congressman Marion Berry, and a law clerk for G. Thomas Eisele. As a legislative aide, his work focused primarily on agricultural issues.

Eldridge transitioned into the banking sector in July 2005 as president of Arkadelphia’s Summit Bank. He joined the board of directors in March 2006. From 2006 to 2008, Eldridge served as corporate executive vice president and senior counsel. He then served as its chief executive officer from 2008 to 2010. Eldridge became special deputy prosecutor for the Prosecuting Attorney's Office of Clark County in 2009.

=== United States Attorney ===
After a unanimous confirmation by the U.S. Senate, Eldridge became the U.S. Attorney for the Western District of Arkansas in 2010. As a federal prosecutor, Eldridge mainly prosecuted child abusers, drug traffickers and fraudsters. In 2014, Eldridge's office successfully prosecuted Brandon Barber, a former Northwest Arkansas developer, who developed schemes to defraud banks, creditors and the Federal Bankruptcy Court. Barber received a sixty-five-month federal sentence for bank fraud and money laundering.

== Cases ==
=== Child abuse prosecutions ===
As a U.S. Attorney, Eldridge prosecuted more than 100 defendants in child-abuse and child-pornography cases. His secured convictions on charges including transporting minors with the intent to engage in sexual activity, possession of child pornography, and production of child pornography. Eldridge said, "there is no higher priority in our office than protecting our children."

Eldridge also proactively sought to fight child abuse by providing information to parents about how to protect their children, and how to be an advocate for the communities on child abuse.

To combat child abuse and help children in violent and crime-ridden homes succeed in their school setting and life, Eldridge launched the A-Chance program in August of 2014. Eldridge saw this program as a step to "truly change the cycle of violence in our communities".

The A-Chance ("Arkansas Cultivating Healthy Attitudes and Nurturing Children to Excel") program allows the police working a domestic violence or crime scene in a home involving school-age children to contact the children’s school officials by early the following day with a “Handle with Care Notice” so that these children will be treated sensitively in the wake of trauma. The program seeks to provide support for children following traumatic events and to help students succeed in school.

==== "Operation Crystal Clear" ====
Beginning in 2011, agents with the FBI and FBI Task Force initiated an investigation, known as “Operation Crystal Clear”, into Jamie Martin and his drug trafficking organisation. During the investigation, agents identified Martin as a supply source in Columbia County, Arkansas. Pursuant to a court order, over the course of an interception, investigators received numerous wire and electronic communications between Martin and his co-conspirators discussing the distribution of methamphetamine and the collection of drug debts. In many of the communications, Martin and co-conspirators used coded language to disguise their drug trafficking activities. Through their investigation, agents learned that Martin was responsible for the distribution of ounce quantities of methamphetamine to various customers in the Western District of Arkansas. Additionally, during the investigation, agents conducted numerous controlled purchases of methamphetamine from Martin. During the course of those controlled buys, Martin sent various co-conspirators to deliver the methamphetamine on his behalf. As a result of this investigation, agents seized over three pounds of methamphetamine, five firearms, and approximately $160,000 in cash. Martin and his co-conspirators were charged in a 15-count indictment by a Federal Grand Jury, which was filed on March 6, 2013. Martin pleaded guilty to one count of Conspiracy to Distribute Methamphetamine on December 11, 2013. During sentencing, it was determined that Martin was an organizer or leader of a criminal activity that involved five or more participants and that Martin possessed a dangerous weapon during the commission of the offense.

After charging 24 individuals with state and federal crimes involving large-scale drug trafficking related to Martin, Eldridge emphasized the importance of "identifying, investigating, and prosecuting drug trafficking organizations in South Arkansas and throughout the Western District." Eldridge went on to ensure that "those who bring this illegal activity onto our streets" will be "held accountable so that Arkansans can have confidence that our streets are safe."

In April 2015, Eldridge announced that Jamie B. Martin, age 36, of Waldo, Arkansas, was sentenced to 240 months in prison followed by three years of supervised release on one count of Conspiracy to Distribute Methamphetamine. Upon sentencing, Eldridge stated that the case resulted in the dismantling of a drug trafficking organization operating in southern Arkansas.

==== Frank Maybee and Sean Popejoy ====
In the early morning hours of June 20, 2010, Frank Maybee and Sean Popejoy of Green Forest, Arkansas, targeted five Hispanic men at a gas station parking lot. According to court records, the victims had not interacted with or provoked the pair prior to the incident. Maybee and Popejoy shouted racial slurs at the men and told them to “go back to Mexico” before pursuing them in Maybee’s truck after the victims drove away. During the pursuit, Popejoy leaned out of the passenger-side window, brandished a tire wrench, and continued yelling threats and racial epithets. Maybee repeatedly rammed the victims’ vehicle with his truck, causing it to cross into the opposite lane of traffic, leave the roadway, crash into a tree, and catch fire. The victims sustained severe injuries, including life-threatening injuries to one individual.

In 2011, Maybee and Popejoy were charged with federal hate crime offenses and were later convicted by a federal jury. Maybee was found guilty of five counts of committing a federal hate crime and one count of conspiracy to commit a federal hate crime, while Popejoy was convicted of one count of committing a federal hate crime and one count of conspiracy to commit a federal hate crime.

U.S. District Judge Jimm Larry Hendren sentenced Maybee to 11 years in prison and Popejoy to 4 years in prison. Eldridge commented that Maybee and Popejoy were the first individuals sentenced under the Matthew Shepard and James Byrd, Jr. Hate Crimes Prevention Act, an Act of Congress that bolstered prosecution of hate crimes in 2009.

Eldridge condemned the incident, stating that “acts of violence that occur simply because of how someone looks are horrific” and describing the targeting of the victims because they were Hispanic as reprehensible. Eldridge also thanked the jury “for their careful consideration of the evidence and for holding the defendants accountable for their actions” and expressed hope that similar acts “never occur”.

== U.S. Senate campaign ==
In 2015, Eldridge announced that he would challenge incumbent Republican John Boozman in the 2016 election to the United States Senate. Eldridge described himself as a candidate with a fresh perspective and an independent voice. Eldridge said he planned to serve and make a difference for Arkansans who are increasingly "frustrated with a Washington that seems further and further removed from the real problems they face every day." Eldridge's campaign emphasized nonpartisanship and "getting things done".

=== Political positions ===
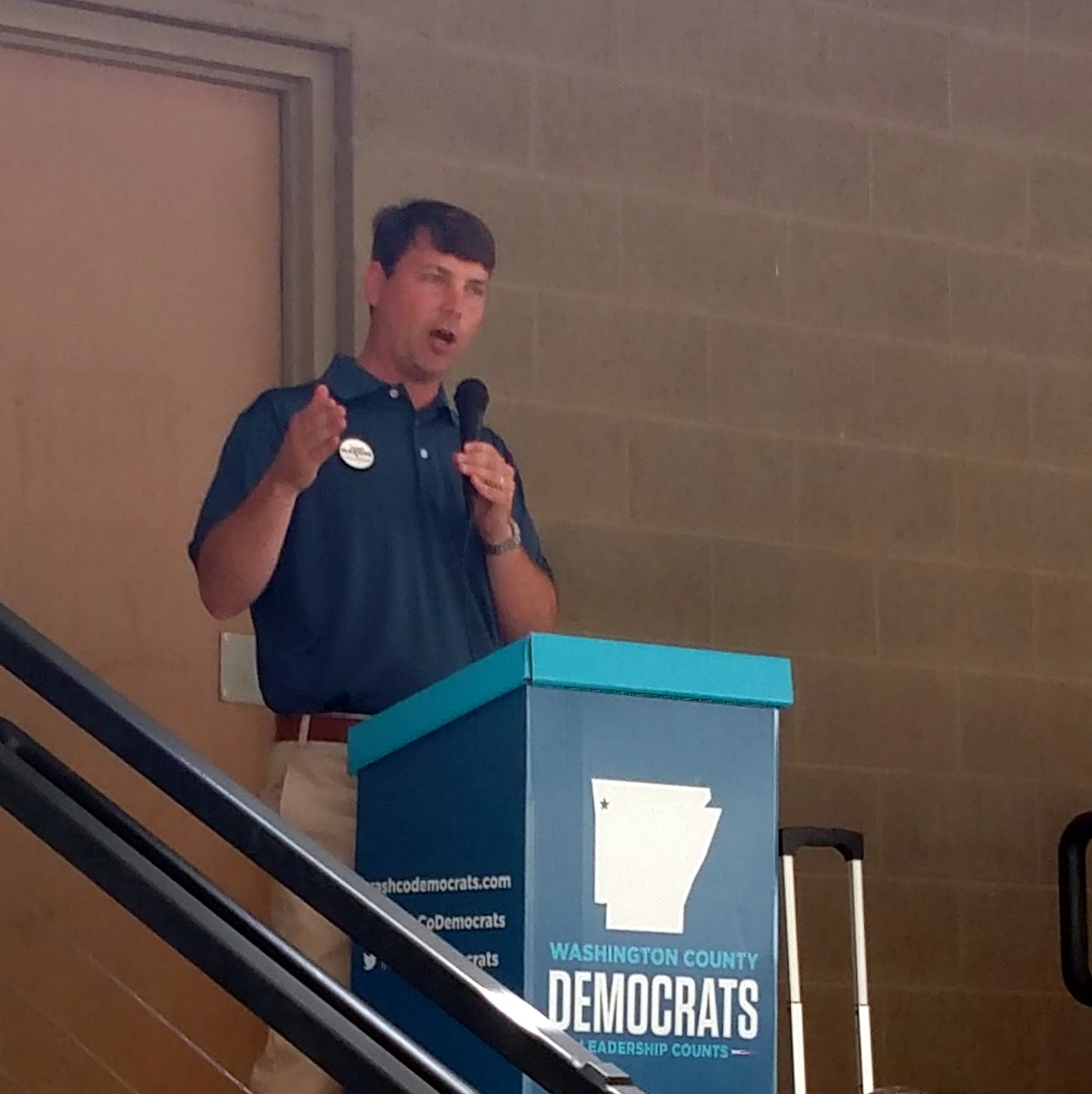
Eldridge addresses a crowd at a Washington County Democrats rally at Shiloh Square in Springdale.

During his campaign, Eldridge promised to prioritize job creation, education and the national debt, among other issues. Specifically, he drew attention to the national deficit and debt. "We know that we've got $18 trillion in debt and that debt has tripled since my opponent took office," Eldridge said. "It is time we start doing something about it now."

Following President Barack Obama's Executive Order on guns, Eldridge, issued a statement encouraging the United States Congress to secure and defend the rights of lawful gun owners under the Second Amendment, enforce the gun laws already on the books, and make it harder for criminals, those with mental health conditions, and terrorists to obtain weapons.

Drawing from his experience as a prosecutor and US Attorney, Eldridge said that if elected to the US Senate, he would introduce legislation that would increase the maximum sentence for child predators, including first-time offenders, to life in prison. This would include criminals who sexually abuse children and those criminals who produce images of minors engaging in sexually explicit conduct.

Party political offices
Preceded by Blanche Lincoln	Democratic nominee for U.S. Senator from Arkansas (Class 3); 2016	Succeeded by Natalie James
