= David D. Terry =

American politician (1881–1963)

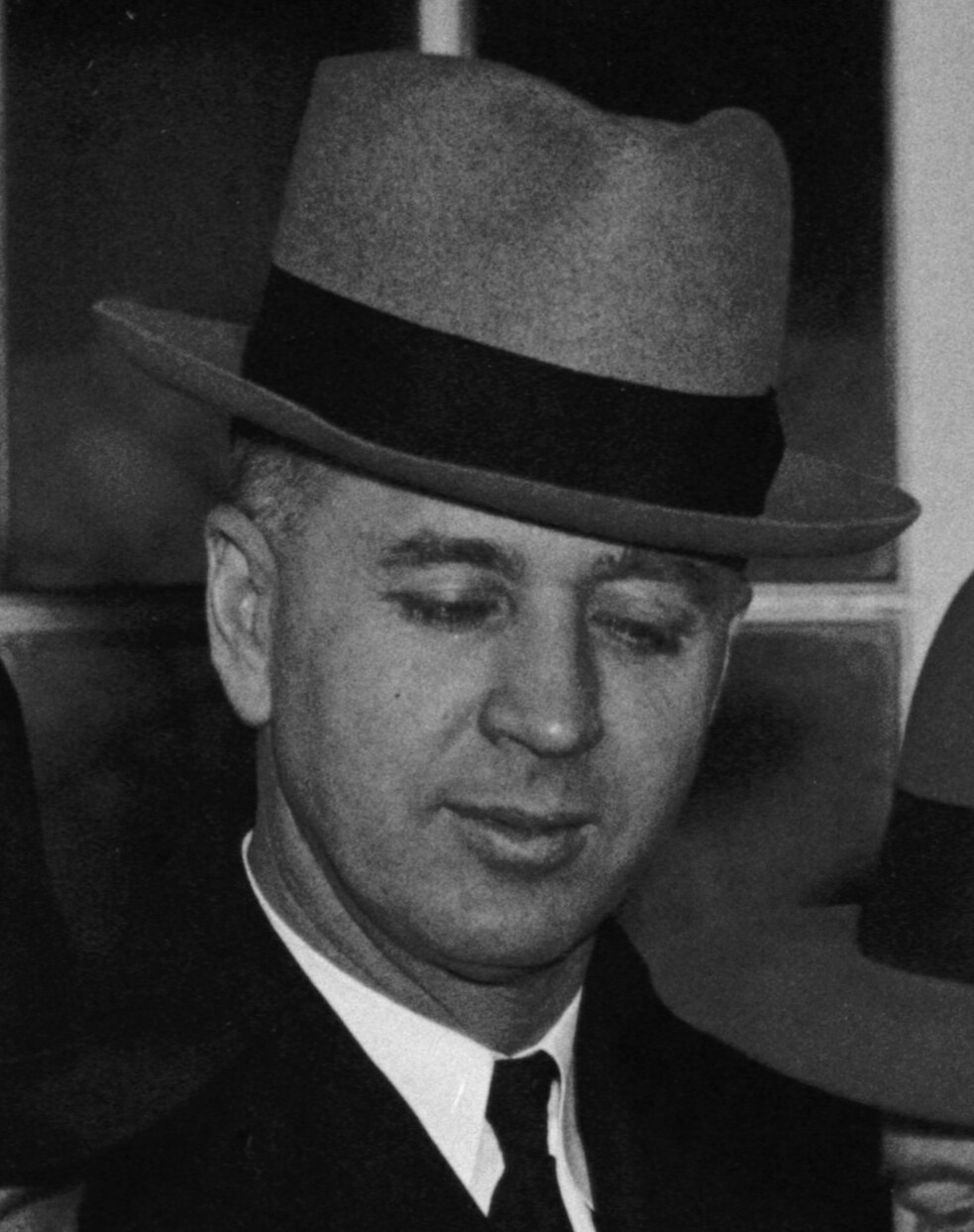

Member of the U.S. House of Representatives from Arkansas's 5th district
- In office December 19, 1933 – January 3, 1943
- Preceded by: Henderson M. Jacoway
- Succeeded by: Brooks Hays

Personal details
- Born: David Dickson Terry; January 31, 1881 Little Rock, Arkansas, U.S.
- Died: October 6, 1963 (aged 82) Little Rock, Arkansas, U.S.
- Resting place: Mount Holly Cemetery
- Party: Democratic

David Dickson Terry (January 31, 1881 – October 6, 1963) was an American lawyer and politician who served five terms as a U.S. representative from Arkansas from 1933 to 1943. He was the son of William Leake Terry.

== Biography ==
Born in Little Rock, Arkansas, Terry attended public schools, along with the Bethel Military Academy in Fauquier County, Virginia and the University of Virginia at Charlottesville. He graduated from the law department of the University of Arkansas at Fayetteville in 1903. Later, he also attended the University of Chicago in Chicago, Illinois. After he was admitted to the bar in 1903, Terry commenced practice in Little Rock.

=== Military service ===
During the First World War, Terry enlisted on June 5, 1918, and was later commissioned a second lieutenant of Infantry. He was discharged on December 20, 1918.

From 1929 to 1933, Terry served as a member of the Little Rock School Board.

=== Political career ===
He was elected to the State House of Representatives in 1933.

Terry was elected as a Democrat to the Seventy-third Congress to fill a vacancy caused by the resignation of Heartsill Ragon. Terry was reelected to the Seventy-fourth and to the three succeeding Congresses, where he served from December 19, 1933, to January 3, 1943. He did not run for reelection in 1942, in order to run for the United States Senate. His run was unsuccessful, and he returned to the practice of law.

He unsuccessfully ran for governor in 1944, and placed third.

Terry served as director of the Division of Flood Control Water and Soil Conservation of the Arkansas Resources and Development Commission from 1945 until 1953.

=== Death ===
Terry died in Little Rock on October 6, 1963. He was interred in Mount Holly Cemetery. Named in his honor, the Little Rock School District opened Terry Elementary School in 1964.

U.S. House of Representatives
Preceded by Henderson M. Jacoway	Member of the U.S. House of Representatives from Arkansas's 5th congressional district December 19, 1933 – January 3, 1943	Succeeded by Brooks Hays
