= Duane Kees =

American attorney (born 1975)

Duane A. Kees
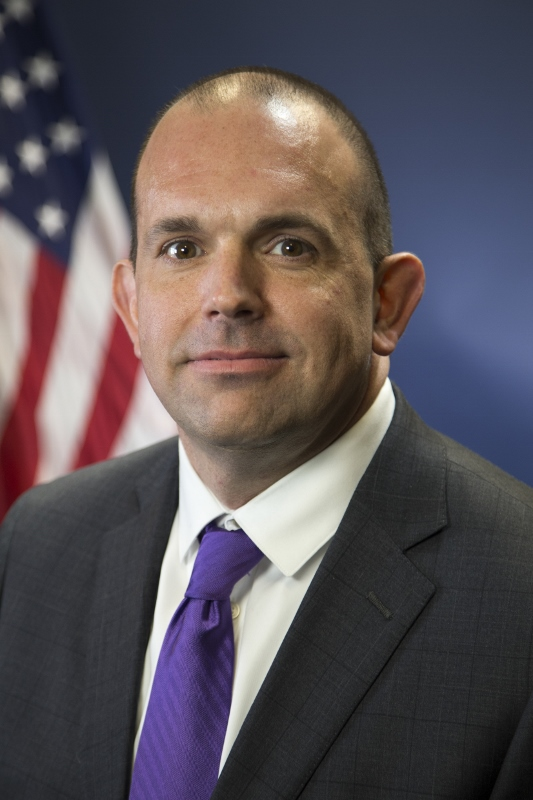

United States Attorney for the Western District of Arkansas
- In office January 5, 2018 – January 17, 2020
- President: Donald Trump
- Preceded by: Conner Eldridge
- Succeeded by: David Clay Fowlkes (Acting)

Personal details
- Born: Duane Adkins Kees; 1975 (age 50–51) Little Rock, Arkansas, U.S.
- Education: University of Arkansas (BA, JD)

Military service
- Allegiance: United States
- Branch/service: United States Army
- Years of service: 2000 – 2008
- Unit: Judge Advocate General's Corps

Duane Adkins ("Dak") Kees (born 1975) is an American attorney and former United States Attorney for the United States District Court for the Western District of Arkansas. He has also served as director of global ethics and compliance at Walmart and as chief counsel for global investigations and regulatory compliance at Tyson Foods.

== Early life and education ==
He received his Bachelor of Arts from the University of Arkansas and his Juris Doctor from the University of Arkansas School of Law.

== Career ==
=== Military service ===
Kees attended The JAG School at the University of Virginia and entered the U.S. Army JAG Corps. he served in the JAG Corps for eight years. During his time on active duty, he prosecuted and defended a variety of complex cases and earned two Bronze Stars and a Meritorious Service Medal. He is currently a major in the Arkansas National Guard. Kees was previously a partner at the Asa Hutchinson Law Group.

=== United States Attorney ===
On September 22, 2017, President Donald Trump nominated Kees to be the United States Attorney for the Western District of Arkansas. On December 20, 2017, his nomination was confirmed in the United States Senate by voice vote. He was sworn into office on January 5, 2018. He resigned on January 17, 2020, to return to the private sector. It later emerged that Kees resigned while being investigated by the Department of Justice for an improper intimate relationship with a subordinate, which Kees began shortly after being sworn in as US Attorney and which lasted approximately seven months.

=== Arkansas Judicial Discipline and Disability Commission ===
In June 2023, Arkansas Attorney General Tim Griffin appointed Kees to the state's Judicial Discipline and Disability Commission, an agency that investigates judges for violations of the state's judicial code of conduct. In May 2024, Kees resigned from the commission after an investigative journalist for The Intercept began making inquiries related to a report released by the Department of Justice, alleging that while serving as US Attorney Kees had an improper relationship with a subordinate and tried to block the firing of another employee who had committed "additional acts of misconduct" to try to keep his own misconduct out of the spotlight.
