= Arkansas Law =

Arkansas Law may refer to:

- The University of Arkansas School of Law
- The law of Arkansas
