= David Clay Fowlkes =

American judge (born 1978)

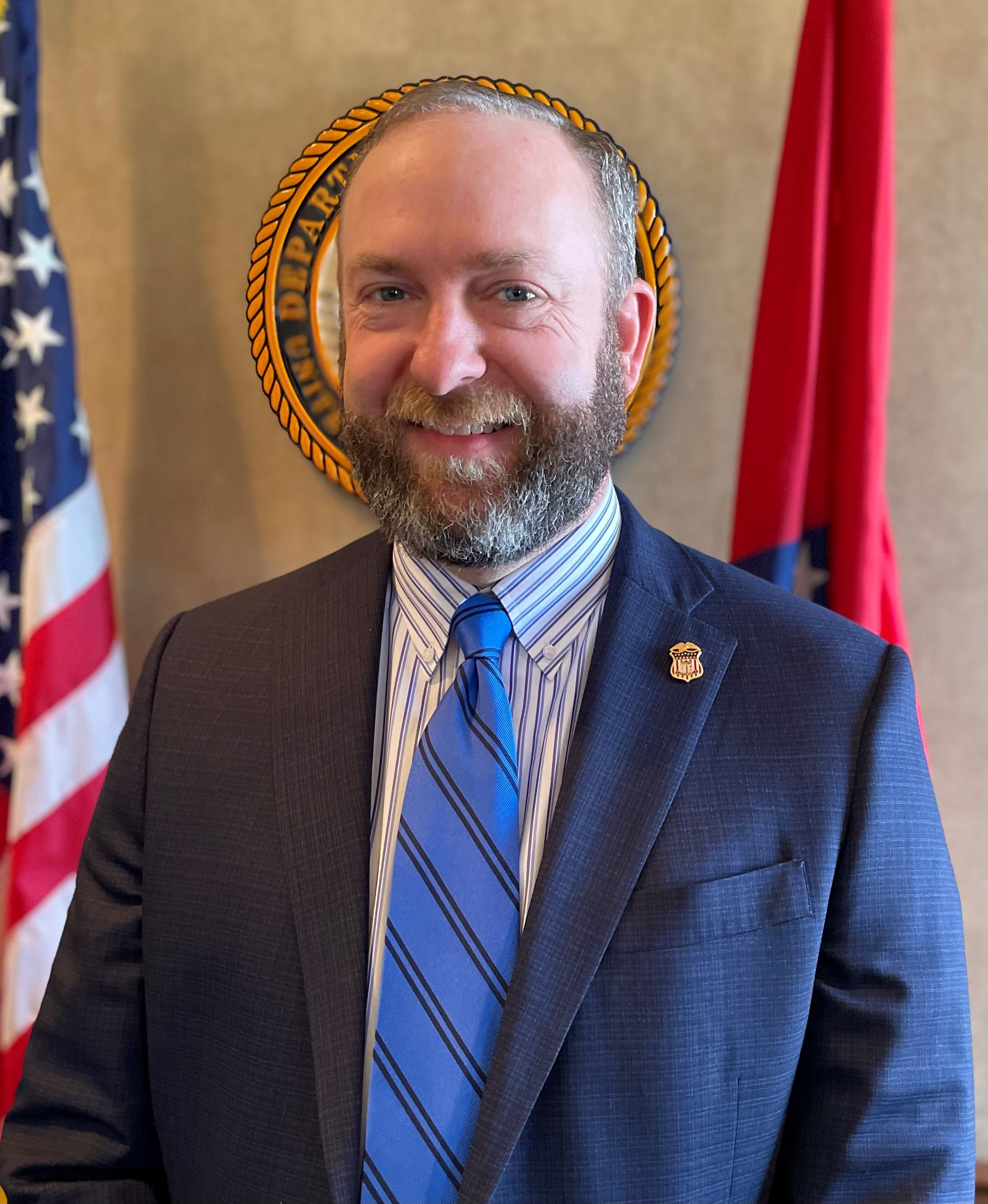

Judge of the United States District Court for the Western District of Arkansas
- Incumbent
- Assumed office February 6, 2026
- Appointed by: Donald Trump
- Preceded by: Paul K. Holmes III

United States Attorney for the Western District of Arkansas
- In office January 21, 2020 – February 6, 2026
- President: Donald Trump
- Preceded by: Duane Kees
- Succeeded by: Kevin Holmes

Personal details
- Born: David Clay Wilkerson Fowlkes; 1978 (age 47–48) Harrison, Arkansas, U.S.
- Education: Arkansas State University (BA); University of Arkansas (JD)

David Clay Wilkerson Fowlkes (born 1978) is an American lawyer who has served as a United States district judge of the United States District Court for the Western District of Arkansas since 2026. He served as United States attorney for the Western District of Arkansas from 2020 to 2026.

== Early life and education ==
Fowlkes was born in 1978, in Harrison, Arkansas. He received a Bachelor of Arts degree in 2000 from Arkansas State University. He received a Juris Doctor in 2003 from the University of Arkansas School of Law.

== Career ==
Fowlkes served in the Benton County, Arkansas Prosecuting Attorney's Office from 2003 to 2007, as Deputy Prosecuting Attorney from 2003 to 2005, and as Division Chief from 2005 to 2007. He served in the United States Attorney's Office for the Western District of Arkansas from 2007 to 2026, as assistant United States attorney from 2007 to 2014, Deputy Criminal Chief from 2014 to 2015, Criminal Chief from 2015 to 2016, first assistant United States attorney from 2016 to 2020 and as United States attorney from 2020 to 2026.

=== Federal judicial service ===
Circa October 28, 2025, President Donald Trump transmitted a filled out Senate Judiciary Committee Questionnaire for United States district judge for Fowlkes, prima facie evidence that Fowlkes' nomination to that office was forthcoming, to a seat on the United States District Court for the Western District of Arkansas vacated by Judge Paul K. Holmes III. Trump announced his nomination on Truth Social on November 12, 2025. His nomination was transmitted to the United States Senate on November 18, 2025. On November 19, 2025, a hearing on his nomination was held by the United States Senate Judiciary Committee. On December 11, 2025, the committee voted to report his nomination to the full Senate by a vote of 15 to 7. On February 2, 2026, the Senate invoked cloture on his nomination by a 49–40 vote. The following day, he was confirmed by a 54–40 vote. He received his judicial commission on February 6, 2026.

== Personal life ==
Fowlkes resides in Farmington, Arkansas.

Legal offices
Preceded by Paul K. Holmes III	Judge of the United States District Court for the Western District of Arkansas; 2026–present	Incumbent
