= 2016 United States Senate election in Arkansas =

- November 8, 2016
- Turnout: 64.65%
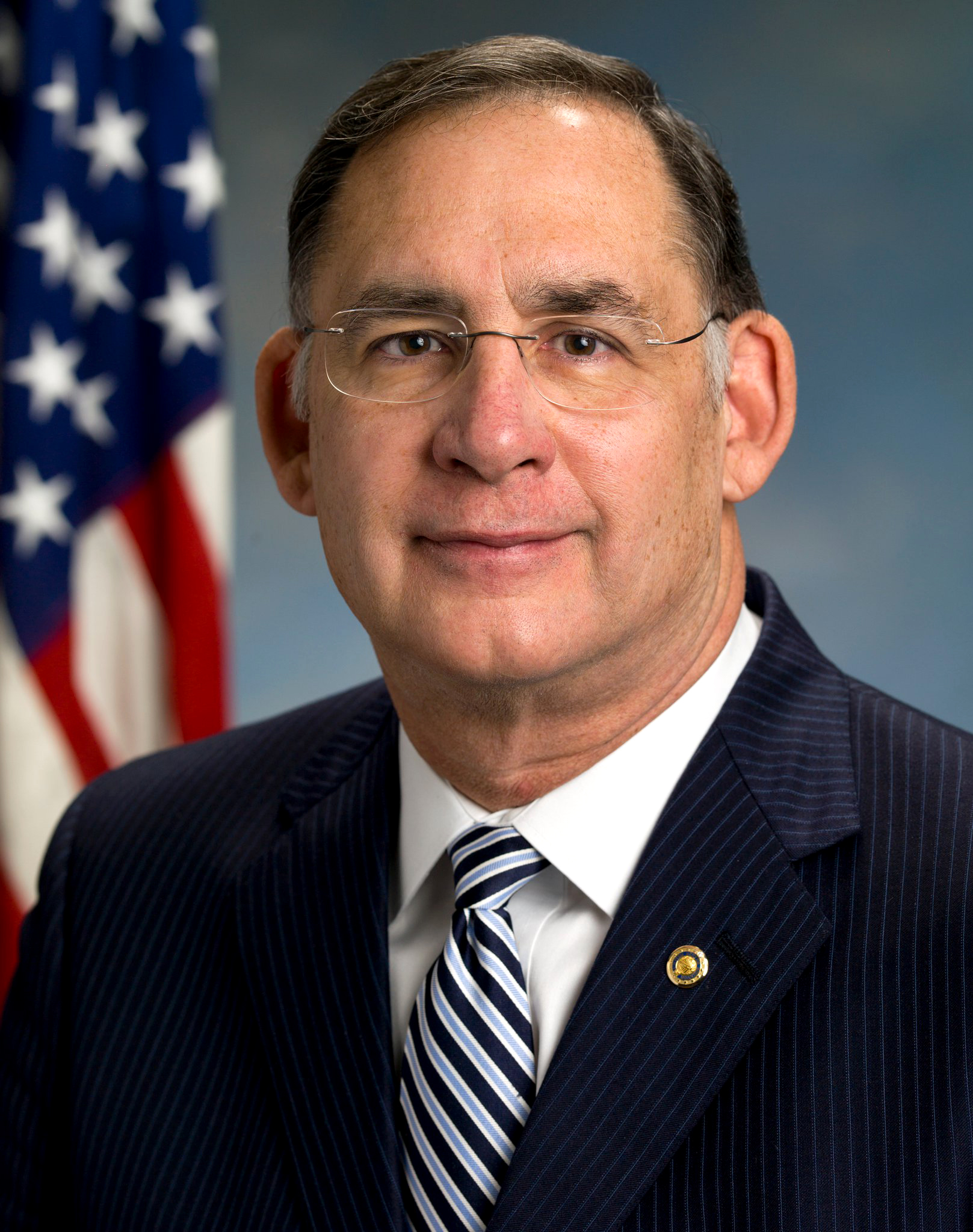

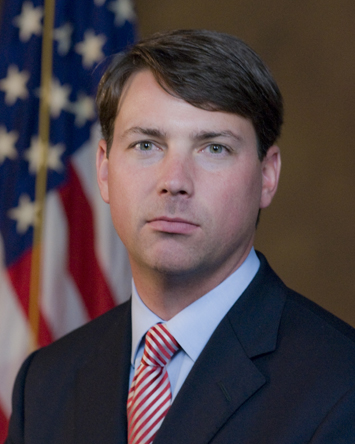
Nominee	John Boozman	Conner Eldridge
Party	Republican	Democratic
Popular vote	661,984	400,602
Percentage	59.77%	36.17%
- Boozman: 40–50% 50–60% 60–70% 70–80% 80–90% >90% Eldridge: 40–50% 50–60% 60–70% 70–80% 80–90% >90% Tie: 40–50% 50% No votes
U.S. senator before election
John Boozman
Republican
Elected U.S. Senator
John Boozman
Republican

The 2016 United States Senate election in Arkansas was held November 8, 2016, to elect a member of the United States Senate to represent the State of Arkansas, concurrently with the 2016 U.S. presidential election, other elections to the United States Senate in other states, elections to the United States House of Representatives, and various state and local elections.

Incumbent U.S. Senator John Boozman won re-election to a second term in office, becoming the first Republican senator reelected in the history of the state. Former U.S. Attorney Conner Eldridge was the only Democrat to declare his candidacy. The primaries were held on March 1. This is also the first election in which the state simultaneously voted for a Republican Senate candidate and a Republican presidential candidate.

== Republican primary ==
=== Candidates ===
==== Declared ====
- John Boozman, incumbent U.S. senator
- Curtis Coleman, businessman, candidate for governor in 2014 and candidate for the U.S. Senate in 2010

=== Polling ===
Poll source	Date(s) administered	Sample size	Margin of error	John Boozman	Curtis Coleman	Undecided
Talk Business/Hendrix College	February 4, 2016	457	± 4.6%	68%	23%	9%

=== Results ===
Republican primary results
Party	Candidate	Votes	%
Republican	John Boozman (incumbent)	298,039	76.45%
Republican	Curtis Coleman	91,795	23.55%
Total votes		389,834	100.00%

== Democratic primary ==
Conner Eldridge was unopposed for the Democratic nomination.

=== Candidates ===
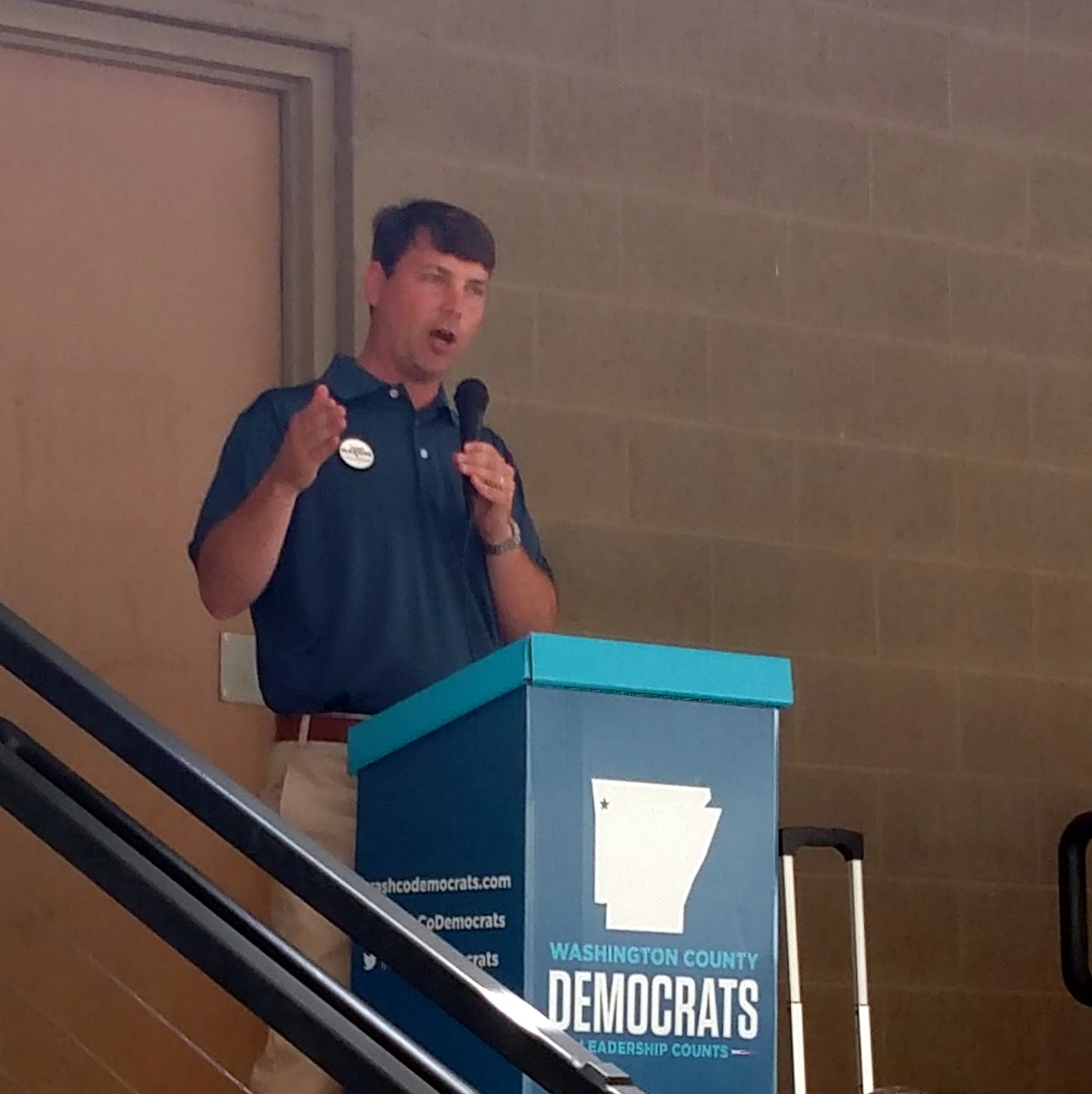
Eldridge campaigning

==== Declared ====
- Conner Eldridge, former United States attorney for the Western District of Arkansas

=== Results ===
Democratic primary results
Party	Candidate	Votes	%
Democratic	Conner Eldridge	214,228	100.00%
Total votes		214,228	100.00%

== Third parties ==
The Libertarian Party of Arkansas held a special nominating convention on October 24, 2015, to select nominees for elections in 2016. Frank Gilbert was selected as the nominee for the U.S. Senate race.

=== Candidates ===
==== Nominated ====
- Frank Gilbert, DeKalb Township constable, former mayor of Tull, nominee for the state senate in 2012 and nominee for governor in 2014

== General election ==
=== Candidates ===
- John Boozman (R), incumbent senator
- Conner Eldridge (D), former United States attorney for the Western District of Arkansas
- Frank Gilbert (L), DeKalb Township constable, former mayor of Tull, nominee for the state senate in 2012 and nominee for governor in 2014

=== Debates ===
Dates	Location	Boozman	Eldridge	Gilbert	Link
October 12, 2016	Little Rock, Arkansas	Participant	Participant	Participant	C-SPAN

=== Predictions ===
Source	Ranking	As of
The Cook Political Report	Safe R	November 2, 2016
Sabato's Crystal Ball	Safe R	November 7, 2016
Rothenberg Political Report	Safe R	November 3, 2016
Daily Kos	Safe R	November 8, 2016
Real Clear Politics	Safe R	November 7, 2016

=== Polling ===
View source data.

Poll source	Date(s) administered	Sample size	Margin of error	John Boozman (R)	Conner Eldridge (D)	Frank Gilbert (L)	Other	Undecided
SurveyMonkey	November 1–7, 2016	930	± 4.6%	56%	41%	—	—	3%
SurveyMonkey	October 31 – November 6, 2016	798	± 4.6%	55%	42%	—	—	3%
SurveyMonkey	October 28 – November 3, 2016	696	± 4.6%	56%	43%	—	—	1%
SurveyMonkey	October 27 – November 2, 2016	593	± 4.6%	54%	43%	—	—	3%
SurveyMonkey	October 26 – November 1, 2016	475	± 4.6%	52%	46%	—	—	2%
SurveyMonkey	October 25–31, 2016	484	± 4.6%	54%	44%	—	—	2%
University of Arkansas	October 18–25, 2016	800	± 3.5%	61%	38%	—	1%	—
Talk Business/Hendrix College	October 21, 2016	463	± 4.6%	52%	34%	4%	2%	8%
Talk Business/Hendrix College	September 15–17, 2016	831	± 3.4%	55%	29%	5%	3%	8%
Emerson College	September 9–13, 2016	600	± 3.6%	44%	30%	—	11%	15%
Talk Business/Hendrix College	June 21, 2016	751	± 3.6%	51%	29%	6%	—	14%

Hypothetical polling

with Mike Beebe

Poll source	Date(s) administered	Sample size	Margin of error	John Boozman (R)	Mike Beebe (D)	Other	Undecided
Public Policy Polling	August 1–3, 2014	1,066	± 3%	40%	46%	—	14%
Public Policy Polling	September 18–21, 2014	1,453	± 2.6%	39%	49%	—	12%
Talk Business/Hendrix College	June 8–11, 2015	1,183	± 1.84%	37%	45%	—	18%

=== Results ===
2016 United States Senate election in Arkansas
Party	Candidate	Votes	%	±%
Republican	John Boozman (incumbent)	661,984	59.77%	+1.87%
Democratic	Conner Eldridge	400,602	36.17%	−0.78%
Libertarian	Frank Gilbert	43,866	3.96%	+0.72%
Write-in		1,070	0.10%	N/A
Total votes		1,107,522	100.00%	N/A
Republican hold				

==== By county ====
County	John Boozman Republican		Conner Eldridge Democratic		Various candidates Other parties		Margin		Total
County	#	%	#	%	#	%	#	%	Total
Arkansas	3,684	59.90%	2,341	38.07%	125	2.03%	1,343	21.84%	6,150
Ashley	5,106	65.99%	2,346	30.32%	285	3.68%	2,760	35.67%	7,737
Baxter	14,074	73.09%	4,231	21.97%	950	4.93%	9,843	51.12%	19,255
Benton	63,503	66.50%	27,434	28.73%	4,562	4.78%	36,069	37.77%	95,499
Boone	12,490	78.86%	2,620	16.54%	729	4.60%	9,870	62.31%	15,839
Bradley	2,019	57.97%	1,343	38.56%	121	3.47%	676	19.41%	3,483
Calhoun	1,336	60.92%	773	35.25%	84	3.83%	563	25.67%	2,193
Carroll	6,771	64.42%	3,318	31.57%	422	4.01%	3,453	32.85%	10,511
Chicot	1,824	43.41%	2,288	54.45%	90	2.14%	-464	-11.04%	4,202
Clark	3,947	47.69%	4,087	49.38%	242	2.92%	-140	-1.69%	8,276
Clay	3,286	65.08%	1,527	30.24%	236	4.67%	1,759	34.84%	5,049
Cleburne	8,382	71.15%	2,902	24.63%	496	4.21%	5,480	46.52%	11,780
Cleveland	2,164	65.54%	1,034	31.31%	104	3.15%	1,130	34.22%	3,302
Columbia	5,440	64.30%	2,757	32.58%	264	3.12%	2,683	31.71%	8,461
Conway	4,403	56.97%	3,023	39.12%	302	3.91%	1,380	17.86%	7,728
Craighead	23,218	66.46%	10,241	29.32%	1,474	4.22%	12,977	37.15%	34,933
Crawford	16,008	72.74%	5,042	22.91%	956	4.34%	10,966	49.83%	22,006
Crittenden	6,779	45.91%	7,412	50.20%	574	3.89%	-633	-4.29%	14,765
Cross	4,456	66.80%	1,997	29.94%	218	3.27%	2,459	36.86%	6,671
Dallas	1,429	53.14%	1,171	43.55%	89	3.31%	258	9.59%	2,689
Desha	1,727	42.34%	2,256	55.31%	96	2.35%	-529	-12.97%	4,079
Drew	3,701	58.50%	2,413	38.14%	213	3.37%	1,288	20.36%	6,327
Faulkner	27,632	59.10%	16,770	35.87%	2,351	5.03%	10,862	23.23%	46,753
Franklin	4,749	70.68%	1,690	25.15%	280	4.17%	3,059	45.53%	6,719
Fulton	3,254	71.60%	1,059	23.30%	232	5.10%	2,195	48.29%	4,545
Garland	24,262	60.08%	14,385	35.62%	1,733	4.29%	9,877	24.46%	40,380
Grant	5,015	69.12%	1,877	25.87%	364	5.02%	3,138	43.25%	7,256
Greene	9,842	70.09%	3,405	24.25%	795	5.66%	6,437	45.84%	14,042
Hempstead	4,168	62.11%	2,352	35.05%	191	2.85%	1,816	27.06%	6,711
Hot Spring	7,259	62.28%	4,006	34.37%	390	3.35%	3,253	27.91%	11,655
Howard	2,969	66.26%	1,377	30.73%	135	3.01%	1,592	35.53%	4,481
Independence	9,020	67.98%	3,747	28.24%	501	3.78%	5,273	39.74%	13,268
Izard	3,593	68.78%	1,404	26.88%	227	4.35%	2,189	41.90%	5,224
Jackson	2,958	58.25%	1,951	38.42%	169	3.33%	1,007	19.83%	5,078
Jefferson	8,805	35.32%	15,342	61.54%	783	3.14%	-6,537	-26.22%	24,930
Johnson	5,680	63.96%	2,882	32.45%	318	3.58%	2,798	31.51%	8,880
Lafayette	1,713	62.54%	954	34.83%	72	2.63%	759	27.71%	2,739
Lawrence	3,912	70.77%	1,380	24.96%	236	4.27%	2,532	45.80%	5,528
Lee	1,271	42.45%	1,636	54.64%	87	2.91%	-365	-12.19%	2,994
Lincoln	2,190	58.87%	1,440	38.71%	90	2.42%	750	20.16%	3,720
Little River	3,368	67.37%	1,443	28.87%	188	3.76%	1,925	38.51%	4,999
Logan	5,209	66.37%	2,342	29.84%	298	3.80%	2,867	36.53%	7,849
Lonoke	17,483	66.09%	7,666	28.98%	1,304	4.93%	9,817	37.11%	26,453
Madison	4,520	66.20%	2,045	29.95%	263	3.85%	2,475	36.25%	6,828
Marion	5,265	75.57%	1,320	18.95%	382	5.48%	3,945	56.62%	6,967
Miller	10,974	70.50%	4,099	26.33%	494	3.17%	6,875	44.16%	15,567
Mississippi	6,835	55.52%	5,023	40.80%	452	3.67%	1,812	14.72%	12,310
Monroe	1,363	48.98%	1,361	48.90%	59	2.12%	2	0.07%	2,783
Montgomery	2,366	68.13%	985	28.36%	122	3.51%	1,381	39.76%	3,473
Nevada	1,881	60.27%	1,115	35.73%	125	4.01%	766	24.54%	3,121
Newton	2,833	76.01%	754	20.23%	140	3.76%	2,079	55.78%	3,727
Ouachita	5,277	55.18%	4,052	42.37%	235	2.46%	1,225	12.81%	9,564
Perry	2,588	61.63%	1,394	33.20%	217	5.17%	1,194	28.44%	4,199
Phillips	2,400	37.69%	3,777	59.31%	191	3.00%	-1,377	-21.62%	6,368
Pike	2,819	72.08%	955	24.42%	137	3.50%	1,864	47.66%	3,911
Poinsett	5,357	70.23%	2,026	26.56%	245	3.21%	3,331	43.67%	7,628
Polk	6,062	75.53%	1,654	20.61%	310	3.86%	4,408	54.92%	8,026
Pope	15,344	68.99%	5,819	26.16%	1,078	4.85%	9,525	42.83%	22,241
Prairie	2,130	64.23%	1,093	32.96%	93	2.80%	1,037	31.27%	3,316
Pulaski	64,378	40.66%	88,892	56.14%	5,069	3.20%	-24,514	-15.48%	158,339
Randolph	4,266	68.20%	1,659	26.52%	330	5.28%	2,607	41.68%	6,255
Saline	33,125	64.15%	16,140	31.25%	2,375	4.60%	16,985	32.89%	51,640
Scott	2,461	71.46%	867	25.17%	116	3.37%	1,594	46.28%	3,444
Searcy	2,704	74.61%	725	20.01%	195	5.38%	1,979	54.61%	3,624
Sebastian	29,405	65.99%	13,060	29.31%	2,095	4.70%	16,345	36.68%	44,560
Sevier	3,036	70.26%	1,076	24.90%	209	4.84%	1,960	45.36%	4,321
Sharp	5,127	72.69%	1,609	22.81%	317	4.49%	3,518	49.88%	7,053
St. Francis	3,153	45.26%	3,643	52.30%	170	2.44%	-490	-7.03%	6,966
Stone	3,690	67.26%	1,530	27.89%	266	4.85%	2,160	39.37%	5,486
Union	10,168	64.55%	4,902	31.12%	683	4.34%	5,266	33.43%	15,753
Van Buren	4,670	65.47%	2,145	30.07%	318	4.46%	2,525	35.40%	7,133
Washington	43,137	53.19%	34,475	42.51%	3,495	4.31%	8,662	10.68%	81,107
White	19,413	69.76%	7,341	26.38%	1,076	3.87%	12,072	43.38%	27,830
Woodruff	917	36.87%	1,521	61.16%	49	1.97%	-604	-24.29%	2,487
Yell	4,221	66.41%	1,881	29.59%	254	4.00%	2,340	36.82%	6,356
Totals	661,984	59.77%	400,602	36.17%	44,936	4.06%	261,382	23.60%	1,107,522

==== Counties that flipped from Democratic to Republican ====
- Arkansas (largest city: Stuttgart)
- Fulton (largest city: Salem)
- Monroe (largest city: Clarendon)
- Mississippi (largest city: Osceola)
- Lincoln (largest city: Star City)
- Jackson (largest city: Newport)
- Lawrence (largest city: Walnut Ridge)

==== By congressional district ====
Boozman won all four congressional districts.

District	Boozman	Eldridge	Representative
1st	63%	33%	Rick Crawford
2nd	51%	45%	French Hill
3rd	64%	31%	Steve Womack
4th	62%	35%	Bruce Westerman
