= Arkansas's 5th congressional district =

Former congressional district

- Obsolete district
- Created: 1880
- Eliminated: 1960
- Years active: 1885-1963

Arkansas's 5th congressional district was a congressional district for the United States House of Representatives in Arkansas from 1885 to 1963.

== List of members representing the district ==
Member	Party	Years	Cong ress	Electoral history
District created March 4, 1885
Samuel W. Peel (Bentonville)	Democratic	March 4, 1885 – March 3, 1893	49th 50th 51st 52nd	Redistricted from the 4th district and re-elected in 1884. Re-elected in 1886. Re-elected in 1888. Re-elected in 1890. Lost renomination.
Hugh A. Dinsmore (Fayetteville)	Democratic	March 4, 1893 – March 3, 1903	53rd 54th 55th 56th 57th	Elected in 1892. Re-elected in 1894. Re-elected in 1896. Re-elected in 1898. Re-elected in 1900. Redistricted to the 3rd district.
Charles C. Reid (Morrilton)	Democratic	March 4, 1903 – March 3, 1911	58th 59th 60th 61st	Redistricted from the 4th district and re-elected in 1902. Re-elected in 1904. Re-elected in 1906. Re-elected in 1908. Retired.
Henderson M. Jacoway (Dardanelle)	Democratic	March 4, 1911 – March 3, 1923	62nd 63rd 64th 65th 66th 67th	Elected in 1910. Re-elected in 1912. Re-elected in 1914. Re-elected in 1916. Re-elected in 1918. Re-elected in 1920. Retired.
Heartsill Ragon (Clarksville)	Democratic	March 4, 1923 – June 16, 1933	68th 69th 70th 71st 72nd 73rd	Elected in 1922. Re-elected in 1924. Re-elected in 1926. Re-elected in 1928. Re-elected in 1930. Re-elected in 1932. Resigned to become judge of the U.S. District Court for the Western district of Arkansas.
Vacant		June 16, 1933 – December 19, 1933	73rd	
David D. Terry (Little Rock)	Democratic	December 19, 1933 – January 3, 1943	73rd 74th 75th 76th 77th	Elected to finish Ragon's term. Re-elected in 1934. Re-elected in 1936. Re-elected in 1938. Re-elected in 1940. Retired to run for U.S. senator.
Brooks Hays (Little Rock)	Democratic	January 3, 1943 – January 3, 1959	78th 79th 80th 81st 82nd 83rd 84th 85th	Elected in 1942. Re-elected in 1944. Re-elected in 1946. Re-elected in 1948. Re-elected in 1950. Re-elected in 1952. Re-elected in 1954. Re-elected in 1956. Lost re-election.
Dale Alford (Little Rock)	Democratic	January 3, 1959 – January 3, 1963	86th 87th	Elected in 1958. Re-elected in 1960. Retired to run for Governor of Arkansas.
District eliminated January 3, 1963
