= Hugh Franklin Waters =

American judge

Senior Judge of the United States District Court for the Western District of Arkansas
- In office August 1, 1997 – April 16, 2002

Chief Judge of the United States District Court for the Western District of Arkansas
- In office 1981–1997
- Preceded by: Paul X. Williams
- Succeeded by: Jimm Larry Hendren

Judge of the United States District Court for the Western District of Arkansas
- In office October 26, 1981 – August 1, 1997
- Appointed by: Ronald Reagan
- Preceded by: Paul X. Williams
- Succeeded by: Robert T. Dawson

Personal details
- Born: Hugh Franklin Waters; July 20, 1932 Hackett, Arkansas, U.S.
- Died: April 16, 2002 (aged 69) Fayetteville, Arkansas, U.S.
- Education: University of Arkansas (B.S.); Saint Louis University School of Law (LL.B.)

Hugh Franklin Waters (July 20, 1932 – April 16, 2002) was a United States district judge of the United States District Court for the Western District of Arkansas.

== Education and career ==
Born in Hackett, Arkansas, Waters received a Bachelor of Science in agricultural engineering from the University of Arkansas in 1955. He was in the United States Navy as a Lieutenant (JG) from 1955 to 1958. He was an agricultural engineer at the Ralston Purina Company in St. Louis, Missouri from 1958 to 1964. He received a Bachelor of Laws from Saint Louis University School of Law in 1964. He was the company attorney at Ralston Purina from 1964 to 1966. He was in private practice of law in Springdale, Arkansas from 1967 to 1981. He was a part-time instructor at the University of Arkansas Law School in 1968.

== Federal judicial service ==
Waters was nominated by President Ronald Reagan on August 28, 1981, to a seat on the United States District Court for the Western District of Arkansas vacated by Judge Paul X. Williams. He was confirmed by the United States Senate on October 21, 1981, and received his commission on October 26, 1981. He served as Chief Judge from 1981 to 1997. He assumed senior status on August 1, 1997. His service was terminated on April 16, 2002, due to his death in Fayetteville, Arkansas.

== Sources ==
Legal offices
Preceded by Paul X. Williams	Judge of the United States District Court for the Western District of Arkansas; 1981–1997	Succeeded by Robert T. Dawson
Preceded by Paul X. Williams	Chief Judge of the United States District Court for the Western District of Arkansas; 1981–1997	Succeeded by Jimm Larry Hendren
