= Harry F. Barnes =

American judge (1932–2019)

Senior Judge of the United States District Court for the Western District of Arkansas
- In office November 1, 2008 – February 27, 2019

Judge of the United States District Court for the Western District of Arkansas
- In office November 22, 1993 – November 1, 2008
- Appointed by: Bill Clinton
- Preceded by: Morris S. Arnold
- Succeeded by: Susan O. Hickey

Personal details
- Born: May 14, 1932 Memphis, Tennessee, U.S.
- Died: February 27, 2019 (aged 86) Camden, Arkansas, U.S.
- Education: United States Naval Academy (BS); University of Arkansas School of Law (LLB)

Harry Francis Barnes (May 14, 1932 – February 27, 2019) was a United States district judge of the United States District Court for the Western District of Arkansas.

== Education and career ==
Born in Memphis, Tennessee, Barnes received a Bachelor of Science degree from United States Naval Academy in 1956 and was in the United States Marine Corps from 1956 to 1961. He received a Bachelor of Laws from the University of Arkansas School of Law in 1964, entering private practice in Camden, Arkansas from 1964 to 1982, initially as the law partner of future United States Representative, Arkansas Governor and United States Senator David Pryor. He was also in the Marine Corps Reserve from 1964 to 1986. He was a municipal judge for Camden and Ouachita County from 1975 to 1982, and a Circuit judge, Thirteenth Judicial District, State of Arkansas from 1982 to 1993.

== Federal judicial service ==
On October 27, 1993, Barnes was nominated by President Bill Clinton to a seat on the United States District Court for the Western District of Arkansas vacated by Judge Morris S. Arnold, whom President George W. Bush had elevated to the Eighth Circuit Court of Appeals. Barnes was confirmed by the United States Senate on November 20, 1993, and received his commission on November 22, 1993. He assumed senior status on November 1, 2008. He died on February 27, 2019, in Camden.

== Sources ==
Legal offices
Preceded by Morris S. Arnold	Judge of the United States District Court for the Western District of Arkansas; 1993–2008	Succeeded by Susan O. Hickey
