= Paul K. Holmes III =

American judge (born 1951)

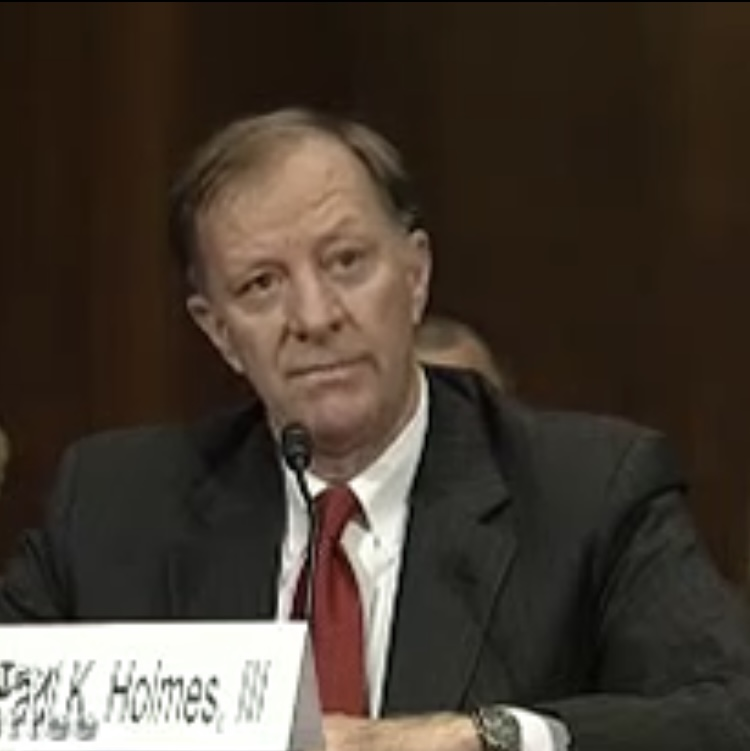

Senior Judge of the United States District Court for the Western District of Arkansas
- Incumbent
- Assumed office November 10, 2021

Chief Judge of the United States District Court for the Western District of Arkansas
- In office February 14, 2012 – February 14, 2019
- Preceded by: Jimm Larry Hendren
- Succeeded by: Susan O. Hickey

Judge of the United States District Court for the Western District of Arkansas
- In office February 8, 2011 – November 10, 2021
- Appointed by: Barack Obama
- Preceded by: Robert T. Dawson
- Succeeded by: David Clay Fowlkes

United States Attorney for the Western District of Arkansas
- In office 1993–2001
- Appointed by: Bill Clinton
- Preceded by: Michael Fitzhugh
- Succeeded by: Thomas Gean

Personal details
- Born: Paul Kinloch Holmes III; November 10, 1951 (age 74) Newport, Arkansas, U.S.
- Education: Westminster College, Missouri (BA); University of Arkansas (JD)

Paul Kinloch Holmes III (born November 10, 1951) is a senior United States district judge of the United States District Court for the Western District of Arkansas.

== Early life and education ==
Holmes was born in Newport, Arkansas on November 10, 1951. Holmes earned a Bachelor of Arts degree from Westminster College in Fulton, Missouri, in 1973 and a Juris Doctor from the University of Arkansas School of Law in 1978.

== Career ==
From 1973 to 1974 he served as a management trainee for the United National Bank in Little Rock, Arkansas. In 1974 he served as a campaign aide to David Pryor when he ran for Governor of Arkansas. In 1975 he served as an Account executive for an advertising agency in Little Rock. In 1976 he served as a law clerk for a private law firm in Little Rock. From 1976 to 1978 he served as a part-time investigator for the Washington County Public Defender's Office in Fayetteville, Arkansas. From 1978 until 1993, Holmes worked in private legal practice in Fort Smith, Arkansas. From 1993 until 2001, Holmes was the United States Attorney for the Western District of Arkansas. From 2001 until his appointment to the federal bench, Holmes worked in private legal practice in Fort Smith.

=== Federal judicial service ===
In December 2009, Arkansas senators Mark Pryor and Blanche Lincoln recommended Holmes to become a federal district judge. On April 28, 2010, President Obama nominated Holmes to the seat on the Western District of Arkansas that was vacated when Judge Robert T. Dawson assumed senior status on August 14, 2009. Holmes' nomination lapsed at the end of 2010, and he was renominated by Obama on January 5, 2011. The United States Senate Committee on the Judiciary voted to advance Holmes' nomination to the full United States Senate on February 3, 2011. The United States Senate confirmed Holmes' nomination on February 7, 2011, by a 95–0 vote. He received his commission on February 8, 2011. He served as Chief Judge on February 14, 2012, until February 14, 2019. Holmes assumed senior status on November 10, 2021, his 70th birthday.

Legal offices
Preceded by Robert T. Dawson	Judge of the United States District Court for the Western District of Arkansas; 2011–2021	Succeeded by David Clay Fowlkes
Preceded by Jimm Larry Hendren	Chief Judge of the United States District Court for the Western District of Arkansas; 2012–2019	Succeeded by Susan O. Hickey
