= Paul X. Williams =

American judge

Senior Judge of the United States District Court for the Western District of Arkansas
- In office October 31, 1981 – January 24, 1994

Chief Judge of the United States District Court for the Western District of Arkansas
- In office 1973–1981
- Preceded by: Oren Harris
- Succeeded by: Hugh Franklin Waters

Judge of the United States District Court for the Western District of Arkansas
- In office June 12, 1967 – October 31, 1981
- Appointed by: Lyndon B. Johnson
- Preceded by: John E. Miller
- Succeeded by: Hugh Franklin Waters

Personal details
- Born: Paul Xandros Williams; February 19, 1908 Booneville, Arkansas, U.S.
- Died: January 24, 1994 (aged 85) Booneville, Arkansas, U.S.
- Education: University of Arkansas (B.A.); University of Arkansas School of Law (LL.B.)

Paul Xandros Williams (February 19, 1908 – January 24, 1994) was a United States district judge of the United States District Court for the Western District of Arkansas.

== Education and career ==
Born in Booneville, Arkansas, Williams received a Bachelor of Arts degree from the University of Arkansas in 1929 and a Bachelor of Laws from the University of Arkansas School of Law in 1930. He was in the United States Navy as a Lieutenant Commander from 1942 to 1946. He was an Assistant United States Attorney of the Western District of Arkansas from 1947 to 1948. He was a Chancellor of the Chancery Court of Arkansas from 1949 to 1967.

== Federal judicial service ==
Williams was nominated by President Lyndon B. Johnson on May 24, 1967, to a seat on the United States District Court for the Western District of Arkansas vacated by Judge John E. Miller. He was confirmed by the United States Senate on June 12, 1967, and received his commission the same day. He served as Chief Judge from 1973 to 1981. He assumed senior status on October 31, 1981. Williams served in that capacity until his death on January 24, 1994, in Booneville.

== Sources ==
Legal offices
Preceded by John E. Miller	Judge of the United States District Court for the Western District of Arkansas; 1967–1981	Succeeded by Hugh Franklin Waters
Preceded by Oren Harris	Chief Judge of the United States District Court for the Western District of Arkansas; 1973–1981	Succeeded by Hugh Franklin Waters
