= Robert T. Dawson =

American judge (born 1938)

Robert Toombs Dawson

Senior Judge of the United States District Court for the Western District of Arkansas
- Incumbent
- Assumed office August 14, 2009

Judge of the United States District Court for the Western District of Arkansas
- In office April 7, 1998 – August 14, 2009
- Appointed by: Bill Clinton
- Preceded by: Hugh Franklin Waters
- Succeeded by: Paul K. Holmes III

Personal details
- Born: Robert Toombs Dawson; August 1, 1938 (age 87) El Dorado, Arkansas, U.S.
- Education: University of Arkansas (BA), LLB)

Robert Toombs Dawson (born August 1, 1938) is a senior United States district judge of the United States District Court for the Western District of Arkansas.

== Education and career ==
Born in El Dorado, Arkansas, Dawson received a Bachelor of Arts degree from the University of Arkansas in 1960. He was in the United States Army from 1961 to 1962 and became a first lieutenant in artillery, and in the Arkansas National Guard from 1962 to 1965, where was also a first lieutenant. He received a Bachelor of Laws from the University of Arkansas School of Law in 1965, and was thereafter in private practice in Fort Smith, Arkansas until 1998.

== Federal judicial service ==
On November 7, 1997, Dawson was nominated by President Bill Clinton to a seat on the United States District Court for the Western District of Arkansas vacated by Hugh Franklin Waters. Dawson was confirmed by the United States Senate on April 2, 1998, and received his commission on April 7, 1998. He assumed senior status on August 14, 2009.

== Sources ==
Legal offices
Preceded by Hugh Franklin Waters	Judge of the United States District Court for the Western District of Arkansas; 1998–2009	Succeeded by Paul K. Holmes III
