= John E. Miller =

American judge (1888–1981)

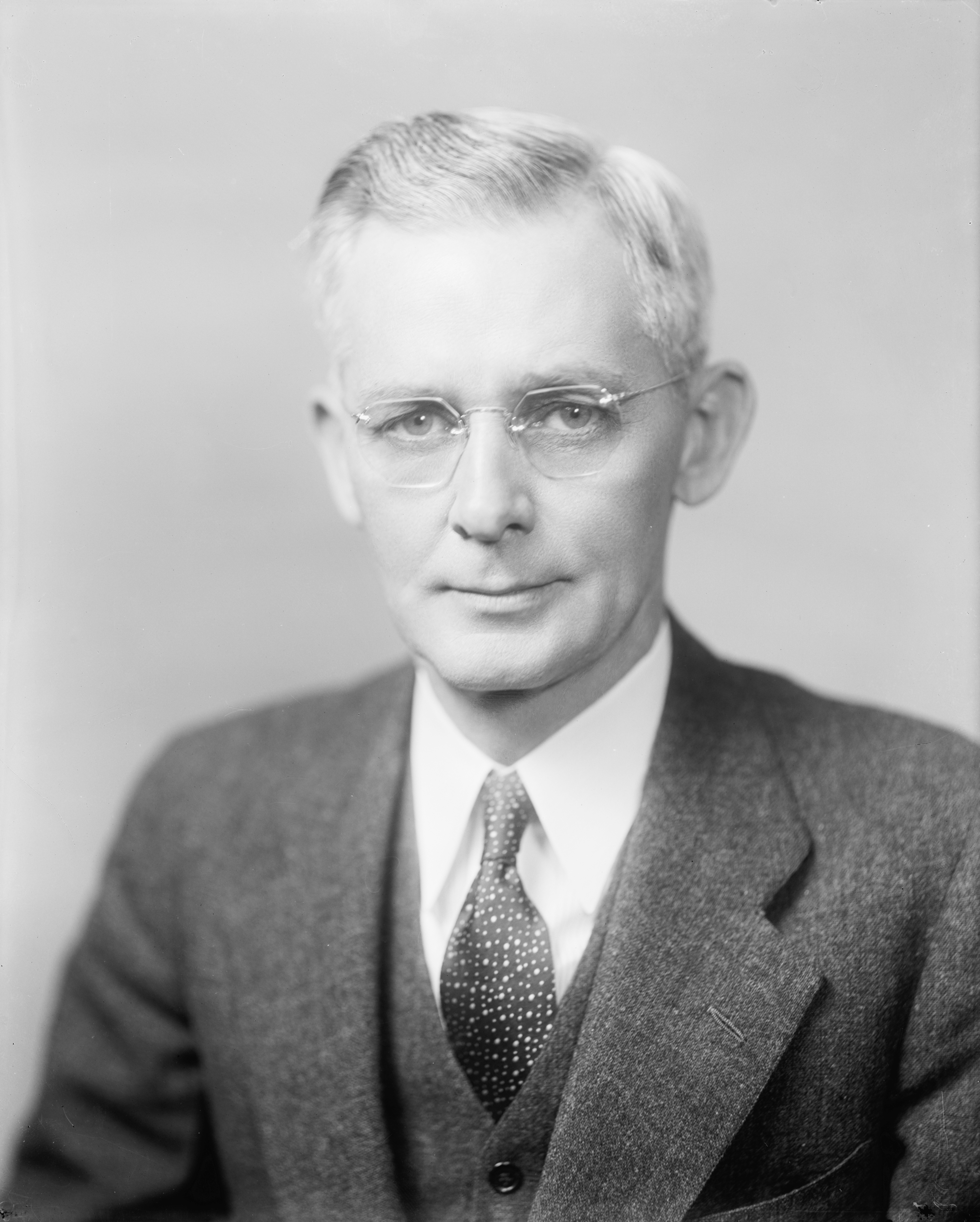
- Miller, 1937–1941

Senior Judge of the United States District Court for the Western District of Arkansas
- In office February 28, 1967 – January 30, 1981

Chief Judge of the United States District Court for the Western District of Arkansas
- In office 1958–1967
- Preceded by: Harry Jacob Lemley
- Succeeded by: Oren Harris

Judge of the United States District Court for the Western District of Arkansas
- In office March 12, 1941 – February 28, 1967
- Appointed by: Franklin D. Roosevelt
- Preceded by: Heartsill Ragon
- Succeeded by: Paul X. Williams

United States Senator from Arkansas
- In office November 15, 1937 – March 31, 1941
- Preceded by: Joseph Taylor Robinson
- Succeeded by: G. Lloyd Spencer

Member of the U.S. House of Representatives from Arkansas's 2nd district
- In office March 4, 1931 – November 14, 1937
- Preceded by: Pearl Peden Oldfield
- Succeeded by: Wilbur Mills

Personal details
- Born: John Elvis Miller; May 15, 1888 Aid, Missouri, U.S.
- Died: January 30, 1981 (aged 92) Little Rock, Arkansas, U.S.
- Resting place: Forest Park Cemetery
- Party: Democratic
- Education: Southeast Missouri State Teachers College; Valparaiso University; University of Kentucky College of Law (LL.B.)

John Elvis Miller (May 15, 1888 – January 30, 1981) was a United States representative and United States Senator from Arkansas and later was a United States district judge of the United States District Court for the Western District of Arkansas.

== Education and career ==
Born on May 15, 1888, in Aid, Stoddard County, Missouri, Miller attended the public schools, Southeast Missouri State Teachers College (now Southeast Missouri State University) and Valparaiso University. He received a Bachelor of Laws in 1912 from the University of Kentucky College of Law and was admitted to the bar the same year. He entered private practice in Searcy, Arkansas from 1912 to 1919 and also engaged in banking. He was a delegate to the Arkansas state constitutional convention in 1918. He was a prosecutor for the First Judicial Circuit of Arkansas from 1919 to 1922.

== Congressional service ==
Miller was elected as a Democrat to the United States House of Representatives of the 72nd United States Congress and to the three succeeding Congresses and served from March 4, 1931, to November 14, 1937, when he resigned to become a United States senator.

He was elected on October 18, 1937, as a Democrat to the United States Senate to fill the vacancy caused by the death of United States Senator Joseph Taylor Robinson for the term ending January 3, 1943, and served from November 15, 1937, until his resignation effective March 31, 1941, to assume a federal judicial post.

== Federal judicial service ==
Miller was nominated by President Franklin D. Roosevelt on January 31, 1941, to a seat on the United States District Court for the Western District of Arkansas vacated by Judge Heartsill Ragon. He was confirmed by the United States Senate on January 31, 1941, and received his commission on March 12, 1941. He served as Chief Judge from 1958 to 1967 and as a member of the Judicial Conference of the United States from 1962 to 1963. He assumed senior status on February 28, 1967. His service terminated on January 30, 1981, due to his death in Little Rock, Arkansas. At the time of his death, he resided in Fort Smith, Sebastian County, Arkansas. He was interred in Forest Park Cemetery.

=== Notable case ===
Miller was one of the district judges in the Little Rock Nine case.

== Sources ==
- United States Congress. "John E. Miller (id: M000738)". Biographical Directory of the United States Congress.

U.S. House of Representatives
| Preceded by Pearl Peden Oldfield | Member of the U.S. House of Representatives from Arkansas's 2nd congressional district 1931–1937 | Succeeded by Wilbur Mills |
U.S. Senate
| Preceded by Joseph Taylor Robinson | U.S. senator (Class 2) from Arkansas; 1937–1941; Served alongside: Hattie Wyatt Caraway | Succeeded by G. Lloyd Spencer |
Legal offices
| Preceded by Heartsill Ragon | Judge of the United States District Court for the Western District of Arkansas; 1941–1967 | Succeeded by Paul X. Williams |
| Preceded by Harry Jacob Lemley | Chief Judge of the United States District Court for the Western District of Arkansas; 1958–1967 | Succeeded by Oren Harris |
