= John D. Raffaelli =

American lobbyist

John D. Raffaelli is an American lobbyist born in Texarkana, Texas. He is the Founder and a partner in the Washington, DC, based lobbying firm Capitol Counsel LLC.

== Education ==
Raffaelli holds a B.S. degree in business administration from American University, a L.L.M. degree in taxation from New York University Law School and a J.D. degree from the University of Arkansas School of Law.

== Career ==
He is one of the "Top 50 lobbyists" in Washington, according to The Washingtonian magazine. The Hill newspaper called him "one of the most experienced Democratic tax lobbyists in Washington" and one "of the best lobbyists for hire in town".

== Charitable activities ==
Raffaelli was on the board of Susan G. Komen Race for the Cure.
