= Heartsill Ragon =

American judge (1885-1940)

- Heartsill Ragon as a member of Congress in 1923

Judge of the United States District Court for the Western District of Arkansas
- In office May 17, 1933 – September 15, 1940
- Appointed by: Franklin D. Roosevelt
- Preceded by: Frank A. Youmans
- Succeeded by: John E. Miller

Member of the U.S. House of Representatives from Arkansas's 5th district
- In office March 4, 1923 – June 16, 1933
- Preceded by: Henderson M. Jacoway
- Succeeded by: David D. Terry

Personal details
- Born: Hiram Heartsill Ragon; March 20, 1885 Dublin, Arkansas, U.S.
- Died: September 15, 1940 (aged 55) Fort Smith, Arkansas, U.S.
- Resting place: Forest Park Cemetery; Fort Smith, Arkansas
- Party: Democratic
- Education: College of the Ozarks; University of Arkansas (AB); Washington and Lee University; School of Law (LL.B.)

Hiram Heartsill Ragon (/ˈræɡən/; March 20, 1885 – September 15, 1940) was a United States representative from Arkansas and a United States district judge of the United States District Court for the Western District of Arkansas.

== Education and career ==
Born on March 20, 1885, in Dublin, Arkansas, an unincorporated community in Logan County, Ragon attended the common schools, Clarksville High School, the College of the Ozarks (now the University of the Ozarks) in Clarksville and graduated from the University of Arkansas in Fayetteville. He received a Bachelor of Laws in 1908 from the Washington and Lee University School of Law. He was admitted to the bar in 1908 and entered private practice in Clarksville, Arkansas from 1908 to 1923. He was a member of the Arkansas House of Representatives from 1911 to 1913. He was district attorney in Clarksville from 1916 to 1920.

=== Party political posts ===
Ragon was Secretary of the Democratic Arkansas state convention in 1918, Chairman of the Democratic Arkansas state convention in 1920, and a delegate to the 1920 Democratic National Convention.

== Congressional service ==
Ragon was elected as a Democrat to the United States House of Representatives of the 68th United States Congress and to the five succeeding Congresses and served from March 4, 1923, until his resignation effective June 16, 1933, having been appointed to the federal bench.

== Federal judicial service ==
Ragon was nominated by President Franklin D. Roosevelt on May 12, 1933, to a seat on the United States District Court for the Western District of Arkansas vacated by Judge Frank A. Youmans. He was confirmed by the United States Senate on May 12, 1933, and received his commission on May 17, 1933. His service terminated on September 15, 1940, due to his death in Fort Smith, Arkansas. He was interred in Forest Park Cemetery in Fort Smith.

=== United States v Miller ===
In 1939, Ragon authored an opinion in United States v. Miller, 26 F. Supp. 1002, stating that a federal statute violated the Second Amendment. Ragon was in reality, in favor of the gun control law and was part of an elaborate plan to give the government a sure win when they appealed to the supreme court which they promptly did. Miller, who was a known bank robber, had just testified in court against his whole gang and would have to go into hiding as soon as he was released. Ragon knew that Miller would not pay for an attorney to argue the case at the supreme court and so the government would have a sure win because the other side would not show up. The plan worked perfectly. His opinion was reversed by the United States Supreme Court in United States v. Miller (1939).

== Sources ==
- Priest, Sharon (1998). Runnells, Jonathan (ed.). Historical Report of the Arkansas Secretary of State. Office of the Arkansas Secretary of State. OCLC 40157815.
- United States Congress. "Heartsill Ragon (id: R000009)". Biographical Directory of the United States Congress.

U.S. House of Representatives
Preceded by Henderson M. Jacoway	Member of the U.S. House of Representatives from Arkansas's 5th congressional district 1923–1933	Succeeded by David D. Terry
Legal offices
Preceded by Frank A. Youmans	Judge of the United States District Court for the Western District of Arkansas; 1933–1940	Succeeded by John E. Miller
