= Frank A. Youmans =

American judge (1860-1932)

Judge of the United States District Court for the Western District of Arkansas
- In office June 20, 1911 – April 11, 1932
- Appointed by: William Howard Taft
- Preceded by: John Henry Rogers
- Succeeded by: Heartsill Ragon

Personal details
- Born: Frank A. Youmans; May 23, 1860 Jefferson City, Missouri, U.S.
- Died: April 11, 1932 (aged 71)
- Education: University of Arkansas; University of Missouri (Litt.B.)

Frank A. Youmans (May 23, 1860 – April 11, 1932) was a United States district judge of the United States District Court for the Western District of Arkansas.

== Education and career ==
Born on May 23, 1860, near Jefferson City, Missouri, Youmans attended Arkansas Industrial University (now the University of Arkansas) and received a Bachelor of Letters degree in 1884 from the University of Missouri. He entered private practice in Fort Smith, Arkansas from 1886 to 1887. He was the United States Attorney for the Western District of Arkansas from 1887 to 1895. He resumed private practice in Fort Smith from 1896 to 1911.

== Federal judicial service ==
Youmans was nominated by President William Howard Taft on May 29, 1911, to a seat on the United States District Court for the Western District of Arkansas vacated by Judge John Henry Rogers. He was confirmed by the United States Senate on June 20, 1911, and received his commission the same day. His service terminated on April 11, 1932, due to his death.

== Sources ==
Legal offices
Preceded by John Henry Rogers	Judge of the United States District Court for the Western District of Arkansas; 1911–1932	Succeeded by Heartsill Ragon
