= Timothy L. Brooks =

American judge (born 1964)

Timothy Brooks

Chief Judge of the United States District Court for the Western District of Arkansas
- Incumbent
- Assumed office September 26, 2025
- Preceded by: Susan O. Hickey

Judge of the United States District Court for the Western District of Arkansas
- Incumbent
- Assumed office March 7, 2014
- Appointed by: Barack Obama
- Preceded by: Jimm Larry Hendren

Personal details
- Born: Timothy Lloyd Brooks; July 17, 1964 (age 62) Detroit, Michigan, U.S.
- Education: University of Arkansas (BS, JD)

Timothy Lloyd Brooks (born July 17, 1964) is the chief judge of the United States District Court for the Western District of Arkansas.

== Biography ==
Brooks was born on July 17, 1964, in Detroit, Michigan, but was raised on a farm in Washington County, Arkansas. He graduated from Fayetteville High School in 1982. He received his Bachelor of Science in Business Administration in 1986 from the University of Arkansas. He received his Juris Doctor in 1989 from the University of Arkansas School of Law. He spent his entire private practice career at the Fayetteville, Arkansas law firm Taylor Law Partners, LLP., starting as an associate in 1989, becoming a partner in 1993. His former practice focused on representing individual plaintiffs and corporate clients in complex civil litigation in both federal and state courts, with an emphasis on commercial and medical malpractice cases.

== Federal judicial service ==
On June 7, 2013, President Barack Obama nominated Brooks to serve as a United States District Judge of the United States District Court for the Western District of Arkansas, to the seat vacated by Judge Jimm Larry Hendren, who assumed senior status on December 31, 2012. His nomination was reported out of committee on January 16, 2014 by a voice vote. The United States Senate invoke clotured on his nomination on March 5, 2014 by a 59–41 vote. His nomination was confirmed later that day by a 100–0 vote. He received his judicial commission on March 7, 2014.

=== Notable rulings ===
On August 31, 2023, Brooks blocked an Arkansas law that requires children under 18 to get parental consent before accessing most social media websites, finding the law is likely unconstitutional. Brooks said in his 50-page ruling that NetChoice is likely to succeed in showing the law is unconstitutionally vague and fails to define which platforms are subject to it.

On March 16, 2026, Brooks blocked an Arkansas law requiring the Ten Commandments to be displayed in classrooms, finding it to be in violation of the Establishment Clause and the free exercise rights. In his written judgment, Brooks stated, among other things, that "nothing could possibly justify hanging the Ten Commandments - with or without historical context - in a calculus, chemistry, French, or woodworking class, to name a few."

Legal offices
Preceded by Jimm Larry Hendren	Judge of the United States District Court for the Western District of Arkansas; 2014–present	Incumbent
Preceded by Susan O. Hickey	Chief Judge of the United States District Court for the Western District of Arkansas; 2025–present	Incumbent
