= Judge Isaac C. Parker Federal Building =

- U.S. National Register of Historic Places
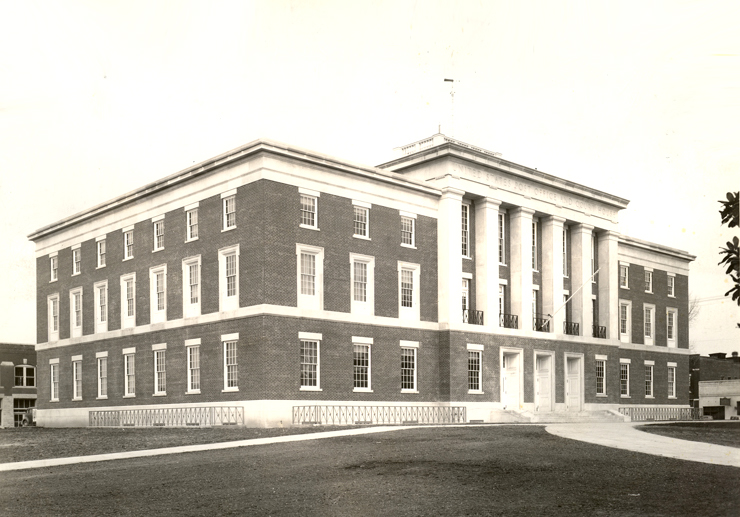

- Location within Arkansas Location within the United States
- Location: 30 S. Sixth St., Fort Smith, Arkansas
- Coordinates: 35°23′10″N 94°25′36″W
- Area: 2.1 acres (0.85 ha)
- Built: 1937
- Architect: Simon, Louis; Melick, Neal A., et al.
- Architectural style: Classical Revival
- NRHP reference No.: 99001406
- Added to NRHP: December 13, 1999

The Judge Isaac C. Parker Federal Building, also known as the Fort Smith U.S. Post Office and Courthouse, in Fort Smith, Arkansas, was built in 1937 in Classical Revival style. It served historically as a courthouse of the United States District Court for the Western District of Arkansas, and as a post office. It was renamed in 1996 for the famous "hanging judge" Isaac C. Parker, and was listed on the National Register of Historic Places in 1999.

== Building history ==
From the early 19th century Fort Smith was a main stop on the Butterfield Overland Mail route from Tipton, Missouri, to San Francisco. The area also had the reputation of being "the end of civilization", and the gateway to the West and the Indian territories of Oklahoma. As such, the federal court under Judge Isaac C. Parker (historically known as the "hanging judge") was active, trying 13,000 cases in 21 years. Judge Parker's court was headquartered at the barracks of the second Fort Smith, a few blocks from the present building, now part of Fort Smith National Historic Site. Fort Smith evolved into an area of great federal activity in the 19th century, and $100,000 was allocated for a federal courthouse and post office building in 1887. The building, completed in 1889, was located at Rogers Avenue and Sixth Street. The imposing Romanesque structure served as the main post office and as the federal courthouse until the present structure was built in 1936.

The present building was constructed less than thirty feet behind the 1889 building on the same site, and workers moved from one building to the other before the 1889 building was demolished. It is not clear why the federal government decided to demolish one building and build another to fulfill the same purpose. Perhaps there was a need for more space and Fort Smith became part of the intense federal building activity in the 1930s. In 1964, the building was expanded with the addition of two wings which were designed to complement the 1936 structure.

== Architectural description ==
The courthouse is a three-story red brick, Classical Revival style building with limestone trim. It consists of an original 1937 building, 151' wide, flanked by two 63' wide symmetrical projecting wings added in 1964. The wings are only two stories high, which leaves the original building rising in the center of the elevation. Limestone detailing is simple and concentrated on the original building elevation. Red brick in a common bond pattern rises from a smooth finish limestone base; a series of six engaged pilasters, with Doric capitals, rise two stories above the first floor base to a plain, 5' high limestone cornice and frieze which borders the entire building, except the rear light court. The words "UNITED STATES POST OFFICE AND COURT HOUSE" are incised into the entablature. There is also limestone trim around the three central entry doors, limestone window sills and lintels, and a limestone stair platform with plinths or cheekwalls, all smooth-finished. A long handicapped ramp with a return visually dominates the approach to the main entry. It is bounded by iron rails which match the ones on the original areaways flanking the entrance.

Three double doors are located in the center of the original main elevation. Original doors have been replaced with pairs of single light aluminum storefront-type commercial entry doors. Aluminum panels face the recessed jambs. Windows are generally multipane (12/ 12) aluminum, single-hung except for a series of 1/1 triple glazed, double hung units (these have false muntins between the glazing in a 12/12 pattern) in the third floor, southwest wing judge's suite. A few original double-hung 12/12 wood windows are located at the second floor southwest wing of the original building, and a few small steel windows are in the roof penthouse.

A copper-clad hipped roof rises from the center of the original building over the projecting pavilion. Originally, the roof had a wood "widow's walk" atop it. The widow's walk was encased in aluminum siding, though the original wood structure remains in place. The remainder of the roof of the original (1936) building and the 1964 wing is built-up tar and gravel.

The first floor interior consists of a 90'x 18' postal lobby with polished St. Claire Genevieve Golden Vein marble wainscotting, terrazzo floors and a simple fretwork plaster frieze. The terrazzo floors consist of black and light brown tiles set on a diagonal (see Zone 2B for description). The lobby originally was 106' long, but 16' have been captured into a Marshal's office at the northeast end. The lobby is distinguished by a series of five free-standing glass-topped cast aluminum 2'x6' postal desks with lion headed legs and claw feet. There is also a large polychrome compass rose with zinc edge strips and zinc letters. The lobby has been sub-divided by two aluminum framed glazed curtain walls (one at each end) into a postal service lobby to the southwest, a central box lobby, and a Marshal's office/checkpoint to the northeast.

The second floor is largely office space, with double loaded corridors which originally had simple finishes: asphalt tile floors and plaster walls. There is an original Magistrate's Hearing Room in the rear center wing, with two original restrooms.

The third floor houses the main courtroom (see Zone 1A for description), and judge's suite. The hallway outside the courtroom serves as a courtroom lobby but it is a modest architectural space. The original courtroom entry doors are oak with reeded jambs, a composite ornament at the corners, and diamond panels (some glazed) in the doors.

== See also ==
- National Register of Historic Places listings in Sebastian County, Arkansas
- List of United States post offices
