= Susan O. Hickey =

American judge (born 1955)

Susan Hickey
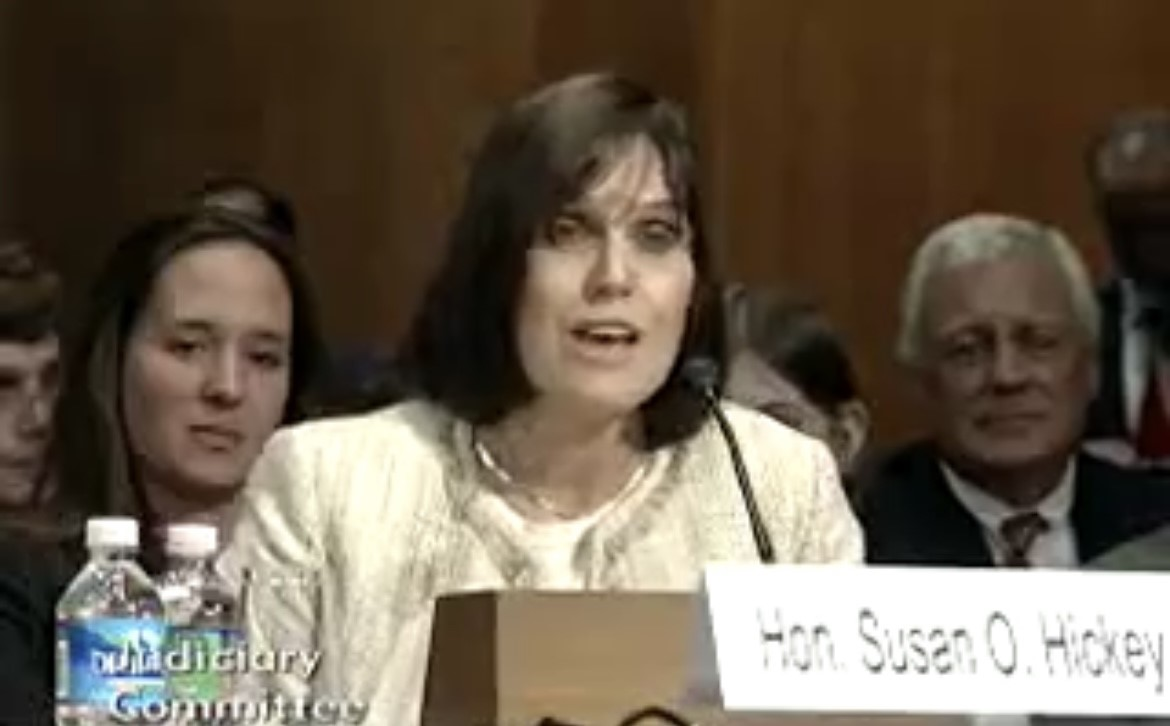

Senior Judge of the United States District Court for the Western District of Arkansas
- Incumbent
- Assumed office April 14, 2026

Chief Judge of the United States District Court for the Western District of Arkansas
- In office February 14, 2019 – September 26, 2025
- Preceded by: Paul K. Holmes III
- Succeeded by: Timothy L. Brooks

Judge of the United States District Court for the Western District of Arkansas
- In office October 19, 2011 – April 14, 2026
- Appointed by: Barack Obama
- Preceded by: Harry F. Barnes
- Succeeded by: John T. Shepherd

Personal details
- Born: Susan Bronwyn Owens; 1955 (age 70–71) Dallas, Texas, U.S.
- Education: University of Arkansas (BA, JD)

Susan Bronwyn Owens Hickey (born 1955) is a senior United States district judge of the United States District Court for the Western District of Arkansas.

== Early life and education ==
Born in Dallas, Hickey earned a Bachelor of Arts degree in 1977 from the University of Arkansas and a Juris Doctor in 1980 from the University of Arkansas School of Law.

== Career ==
Before pursuing a legal career, she served as a Bank teller for the United Federal Savings Bank in Springdale, Arkansas in 1978.

Her legal career began in 1981 when she served as an attorney for a single trial while employed at Brown, Compton, and Prewett Ltd in El Dorado, Arkansas.

From 1981 until 1984, Hickey worked as a staff attorney at Murphy Oil Corporation. She then served as a career law clerk to Judge Harry F. Barnes of the United States District Court for the Western District of Arkansas until 2010. In 2010, Hickey became an Arkansas Circuit Courts Judge on the Thirteenth Judicial Circuit.

=== Federal judicial service ===
On April 6, 2011, President Barack Obama nominated Hickey to a seat on the United States District Court for the Western District of Arkansas to fill the vacancy created when Harry F. Barnes assumed senior status in 2008. On October 13, 2011, the United States Senate confirmed Hickey by an 83–8 vote. She received her commission on October 19, 2011. She became chief judge on February 14, 2019, succeeding Paul K. Holmes III. She assumed senior status on April 14, 2026.

Legal offices
Preceded by Harry F. Barnes	Judge of the United States District Court for the Western District of Arkansas; 2011–2026	Succeeded by John T. Shepherd
Preceded by Paul K. Holmes III	Chief Judge of the United States District Court for the Western District of Arkansas; 2019–2025	Succeeded by Timothy L. Brooks
