= Oren Harris =

American judge (1903–1997)

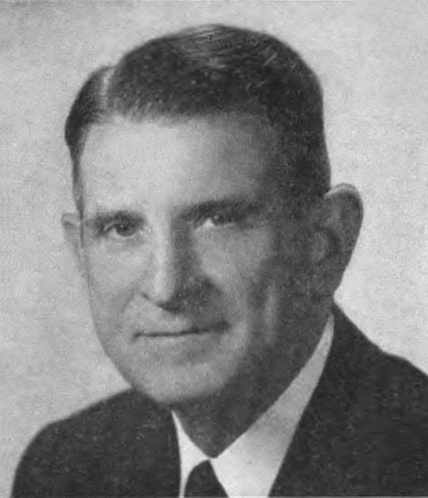

Senior Judge of the United States District Court for the Eastern and Western District of Arkansas
- In office February 3, 1976 – February 5, 1997

Chief Judge of the United States District Court for the Western District of Arkansas
- In office 1967–1973
- Preceded by: John E. Miller
- Succeeded by: Paul X. Williams

Judge of the United States District Court for the Eastern and Western District of Arkansas
- In office August 12, 1965 – February 3, 1976
- Appointed by: Lyndon B. Johnson
- Preceded by: Seat established by 75 Stat. 80
- Succeeded by: Elsijane Trimble Roy

Member of the U.S. House of Representatives from Arkansas
- In office January 3, 1941 – February 3, 1966
- Preceded by: Wade H. Kitchens
- Succeeded by: David Pryor
- Constituency: 7th district (1941–1953); 4th district (1953–1966)

Personal details
- Born: December 20, 1903 Belton, Arkansas, U.S.
- Died: February 5, 1997 (aged 93) Little Rock, Arkansas, U.S.
- Party: Democratic
- Education: Henderson State College (A.B.); Cumberland School of Law (LL.B.)

Oren Harris (December 20, 1903 – February 5, 1997) was a United States representative from Arkansas and a United States district judge of the United States District Court for the Eastern District of Arkansas and the United States District Court for the Western District of Arkansas.

== Education and career ==
Born in Belton, a historical populated place, in Hempstead County near Hope, Arkansas, Harris attended public schools in Prescott in Nevada County, Arkansas. In 1929, he graduated from Henderson State College in Arkadelphia, Arkansas, receiving an Artium Baccalaureus degree. Thereafter in 1930, he completed law school at Cumberland School of Law, then part of Cumberland University, in Lebanon, Tennessee, receiving a Bachelor of Laws. He was admitted to the bar in 1930 and commenced practice in El Dorado, the seat of government of Union County, Arkansas. Harris served as deputy prosecuting attorney in Union County from 1933 to 1936 and as prosecuting attorney of the 13th Judicial Circuit of Arkansas from 1937 to 1940. He served as delegate to the Democratic state conventions in 1936 and 1940, and the Democratic National Conventions in 1944, 1952, 1956, and 1960.

== Congressional service ==
In 1940, Harris was elected as United States Representative for Arkansas's 7th congressional district, which in 1950 was redistricted to 4th district, encompassing the southern portion of the state. He served without interruption for more than twenty-five years, from January 3, 1941, until February 2, 1966. He was the chairman of the Subcommittee on Legislative Oversight of the Committee on Interstate and Foreign Commerce, where in 1959 he presided over hearings on the "quiz show scandal." In the 1960s, Harris was the chairman of the Committee on Interstate and Foreign Commerce (Eighty-fifth through Eighty-ninth Congresses). He was the lead House sponsor of the Kefauver Harris Amendment, an amendatory act to the federal Pure Food and Drug Act, the law that mandates that pharmaceutical companies disclose the side effects of medications approved by the United States Food and Drug Administration for sale in the United States.

Harris was a signatory to the 1956 Southern Manifesto that opposed the desegregation of public schools ordered by the Supreme Court in Brown v. Board of Education.

At the time of Harris's resignation, the entire Arkansas congressional delegation had been in office since 1953 or earlier, and the prolonged period without an open seat had created a backlog of candidates awaiting a vacancy. In a special Democratic primary, future United States Senator David Pryor defeated future federal judge Richard S. Arnold and several other candidates. Pryor then took the position after he defeated Republican A. Lynn Lowe of Texarkana in the special general election.

== Federal judicial service ==
Harris was nominated by President Lyndon B. Johnson on July 26, 1965, to the United States District Court for the Eastern District of Arkansas and the United States District Court for the Western District of Arkansas, to a new joint seat authorized by 75 Stat. 80. He was confirmed by the United States Senate on August 11, 1965, and received his commission on August 12, 1965. He took the judicial oath and commenced service on February 3, 1966. He served as Chief Judge of the Western District from 1967 to 1973. He assumed senior status on February 3, 1976, but maintained a full docket of cases until about the last year of his life, when his health began to fail. His service terminated on February 5, 1997, due to his death of pneumonia in Little Rock, Arkansas.

== Sources ==
- FJC Bio
- United States Congress. "Oren Harris (id: H000249)". Biographical Directory of the United States Congress.

U.S. House of Representatives
Preceded by Wade H. Kitchens	Member of the U.S. House of Representatives from Arkansas's 7th congressional district 1941–1953	District abolished
Preceded by Boyd A. Tackett	Member of the U.S. House of Representatives from Arkansas's 4th congressional district 1953–1966	Succeeded by David Pryor
Legal offices
Preceded by Seat established by 80 Stat. 75	Judge of the United States District Court for the Eastern District of Arkansas; Judge of the United States District Court for the Western District of Arkansas; 1965–1976	Succeeded by Elsijane Trimble Roy
Preceded by John E. Miller	Chief Judge of the United States District Court for the Western District of Arkansas; 1967–1973	Succeeded by Paul X. Williams
