= Jimm Larry Hendren =

American judge (born 1940)

Senior Judge of the United States District Court for the Western District of Arkansas
- Incumbent
- Assumed office December 31, 2012

Chief Judge of the United States District Court for the Western District of Arkansas
- In office 1997–2012
- Preceded by: Hugh Franklin Waters
- Succeeded by: Paul K. Holmes III

Judge of the United States District Court for the Western District of Arkansas
- In office March 18, 1992 – December 31, 2012
- Appointed by: George H. W. Bush
- Preceded by: Seat established by 104 Stat. 5089
- Succeeded by: Timothy L. Brooks

Personal details
- Born: June 11, 1940 (age 86) Gravette, Arkansas, U.S.
- Education: University of Arkansas (BA, LLB)

Jimm Larry Hendren (born June 11, 1940 in Gravette, Arkansas) is an inactive senior United States district judge of the United States District Court for the Western District of Arkansas.

== Education and career ==
Hendren graduated with a Bachelor of Arts degree from the University of Arkansas in 1964 and then received a Bachelor of Laws from the University of Arkansas School of Law in 1965. Later that year Hendren would join the JAG Corps of the United States Navy, returning in 1968, for a year, to his private practice in Bentonville, Arkansas, which he would expand in later years. In 1970 Hendren became a United States Naval Reserve Lieutenant Commander, a position he would hold until 1983. Meanwhile, in 1977, he became a probate judge (Chancellor) of Arkansas' Sixteenth Chancery District, before returning again to his private practice.

== Federal judicial service ==
Hendren was nominated by George H. W. Bush as a United States District Judge of the United States District Court for the Western District of Arkansas on November 5, 1991, to a new seat created by 104 Statute 5089. The nomination was confirmed by the United States Senate on March 13, 1992, and Hendren received his commission on March 18, 1992. He served as the Chief Judge from 1997 until he assumed senior status on December 31, 2012.

== Notable case ==
Hendren is well known for ruling in favor of Billy Ray and Mary Nell Counts, a couple in Cedarville, Arkansas, in the 2003 lawsuit Counts et ux. v. Cedarville School Board. The court decided that the local school's rule requiring parents' written consent to read the Harry Potter books was unconstitutional. The district court's opinion can be found here, and the decision was cited as precedent in subsequent censorship cases.

== See also ==
- Religious debates over Harry Potter
- Legal disputes over the Harry Potter series

Legal offices
Preceded by Seat established by 104 Stat. 5089	Judge of the United States District Court for the Western District of Arkansas; 1992–2012	Succeeded by Timothy L. Brooks
Preceded by Hugh Franklin Waters	Chief Judge of the United States District Court for the Western District of Arkansas; 1997–2012	Succeeded by Paul K. Holmes III
