= Harry Jacob Lemley =

American judge

Senior Judge of the United States District Court for the Eastern District of Arkansas Senior Judge of the United States District Court for the Western District of Arkansas
- In office September 5, 1958 – March 5, 1965

Chief Judge of the United States District Court for the Western District of Arkansas
- In office 1948–1958
- Preceded by: Office established
- Succeeded by: John E. Miller

Judge of the United States District Court for the Eastern District of Arkansas Judge of the United States District Court for the Western District of Arkansas
- In office May 11, 1939 – September 5, 1958
- Appointed by: Franklin D. Roosevelt
- Preceded by: Seat established by 52 Stat. 584
- Succeeded by: J. Smith Henley

Personal details
- Born: Harry Jacob Lemley; August 6, 1883 Upperville, Virginia, U.S.
- Died: March 5, 1965 (aged 81)
- Education: Washington and Lee University; School of Law (LL.B.)

Harry Jacob Lemley (August 6, 1883 – March 5, 1965) was a United States district judge of the United States District Court for the Eastern District of Arkansas and the United States District Court for the Western District of Arkansas.

== Education and career ==
Born in Upperville, Virginia, Lemley received a Bachelor of Laws in 1910 from Washington and Lee University School of Law in Lexington, Virginia. He was in private practice in Hope, Arkansas from 1912 to 1939. From 1931 to 1933, he was a member of the Arkansas State Highway Audit Commission.

== Federal judicial service ==
Lemley was nominated by President Franklin D. Roosevelt on April 27, 1939, to the United States District Court for the Eastern District of Arkansas and the United States District Court for the Western District of Arkansas, to a new joint seat authorized by 52 Stat. 584. He was confirmed by the United States Senate on May 8, 1939, and received his commission on May 11, 1939. He served as Chief Judge of the Western District from 1948 to 1958. He assumed senior status on September 5, 1958. His service terminated on March 5, 1965, due to his death.

=== Role in Little Rock Integration Crisis ===
Lemley was originally assigned to the 1957 Little Rock Integration Crisis. He granted the school board a two-year delay in the implementation of the desegregation order, but the decision was reversed by the United States Court of Appeals for the Eighth Circuit. Lemley then retired from full-time judicial duties, and the desegregation case passed to Ronald Davies, a North Dakota jurist sent to Little Rock by the Eighth Circuit.

== Sources ==
Legal offices
Preceded by Seat established by 52 Stat. 584	Judge of the United States District Court for the Eastern District of Arkansas; Judge of the United States District Court for the Western District of Arkansas; 1939–1958	Succeeded by J. Smith Henley
Preceded by Office established	Chief Judge of the United States District Court for the Western District of Arkansas; 1948–1958	Succeeded by John E. Miller
