= Mark R. Killenbeck =

American legal scholar and historian (born 1948)

Mark Robert Killenbeck (September 29, 1948 – March 29, 2025) was an American legal scholar and historian who was the Wylie H. Davis Distinguished Professor of Law at the University of Arkansas School of Law. He earned a bachelor's degree in English literature from Boston College and a JD and a PhD at the University of Nebraska. After teaching literature at the University of Kansas, Killenbeck worked for thirteen years in central administrative positions for the University of Nebraska system. In 1988 he accepted a teaching position in law at the University of Nebraska–Lincoln. He was made Distinguished Professor at the University of Arkansas in 1999. He wrote two books and numerous articles, some of which have been published in the Supreme Court Review, the California Law Review, and the Michigan Law Review.

He was a contributing editor of the history journals Historically Speaking. and The Journal of Supreme Court History. In 1994 he was elected a member of the American Law Institute.

== Selected works ==
=== Books ===
- M'Cullough v. Maryland (University Press of Kansas, 2006)
- The Tenth Amendment and State Sovereignty: Constitutional History and Contemporary Issues (Rowman & Littlefield, 2002)

=== Articles ===
- "Another Such Victory? Term Limits, Section 2 of the Fourteenth Amendment, and the Right to Representation". (1994). Hastings Law Journal. with Steve Sheppard.
- "A Matter of Mere Approval? The Role of the President in the Creation of Legislative History". (1995). Arkansas Law Review.
- "Pursuing the Great Experiment: Reserved Powers in a Post–Ratification, Compound Republic". (1999). The Supreme Court Review.
- "Pushing Things Up to Their First Principles: Reflections on the Values of Affirmative Actions". (1999). California Law Review. 87(6):1302–1368.
- "The Physics of Federalism". (2002). The University of Kansas Law Review.
- "In(re)dignity: The New Federalism in Perspective". (2005). Arkansas Law Review.
- "Madison, M'Culloch, and Matters of Judicial Cognizance: Some Thoughts on the Nature and Scope of Judicial Review". (2003). Arkansas Law Review.
