= Julian Waterman =

American legal scholar

Julian Seesel Waterman
- Born: September 8, 1891; Pine Bluff, Arkansas
- Died: September 18, 1943 (aged 52)
- Education: Tulane University (B.A.); University of Michigan (M.A.); University of Chicago Law School (J.D.)

Julian Seesel Waterman was an American legal and economic scholar who was the founder and inaugural dean of the University of Arkansas School of Law

== Education and career ==
Waterman was born on September 8, 1891, in Pine Bluff, Arkansas. After graduating from Pine Bluff High School, he attended Tulane University, where he graduated with a B.A. in 1912. In 1913, he graduated from the University of Michigan with an M.A. in economics. Between 1914 and 1922, he served as a professor of economics at the University of Arkansas. During this time, he occasionally took leave to study at the University of Chicago Law School, where he earned a J.D. with honors in 1923 and finished first in his class.

During his time at Chicago, Waterman was approached by the president of the University of Arkansas, John C. Futrall, to conduct research on what would be required to establish a law school at Arkansas. After conferring with the dean of the University of Chicago Law School, James Parker Hall, Waterman produced a report explaining the feasibility of creating a new law school. After further correspondence with Futrall, Waterman returned to Arkansas and became involved in the planning of the new law school, which the university's board of trustees approved on April 14, 1924. The law school was established, with Waterman serving as its first dean. He later served as vice president of the University of Arkansas from 1937 to 1943.

On September 18, 1943, Waterman died of a ruptured appendix. In 1953, the university named Waterman Hall in his memory.
