= Henderson M. Jacoway =

American politician (1870-1947)

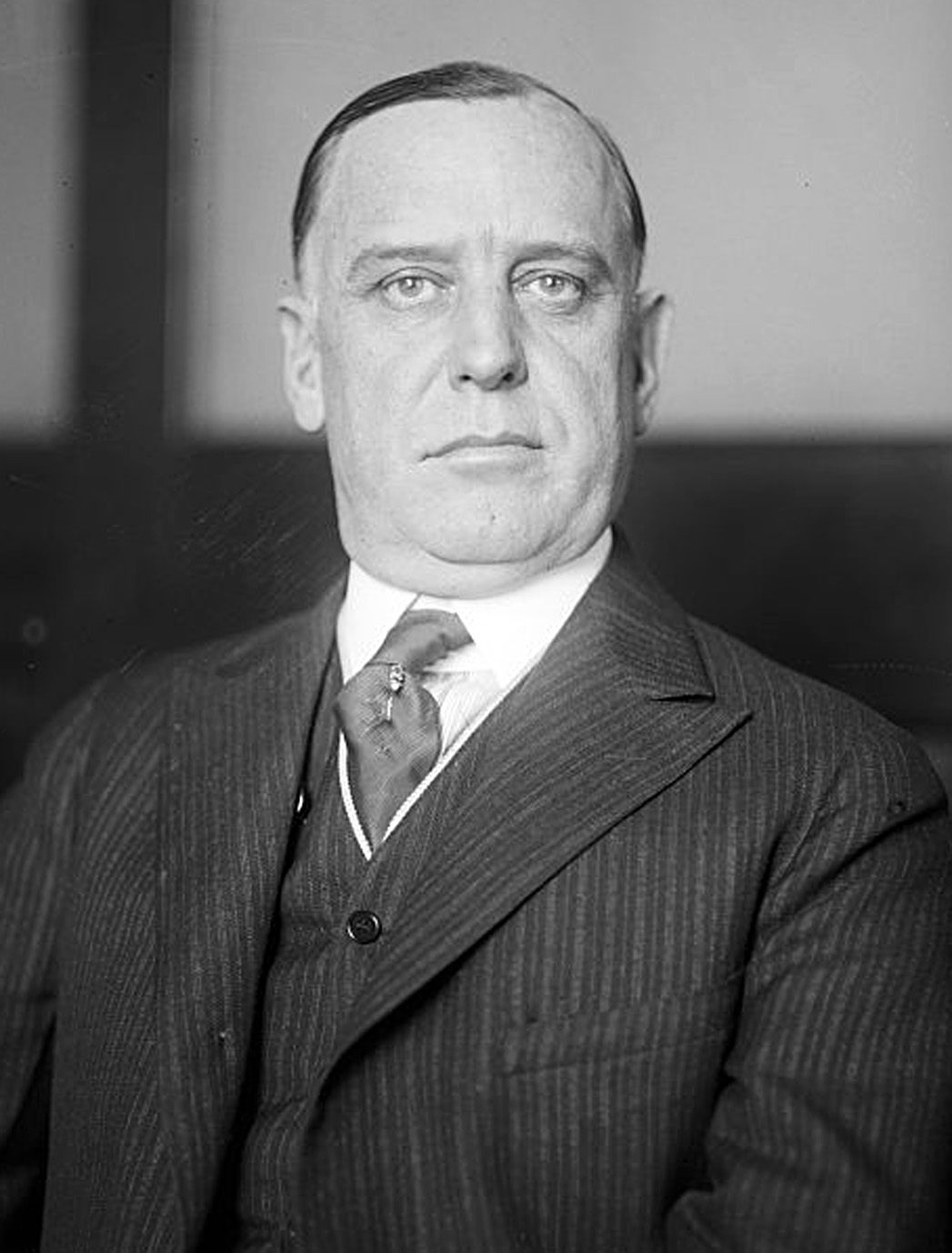

Member of the U.S. House of Representatives from 's 5th district
- In office March 4, 1911 – March 3, 1923
- Preceded by: Charles C. Reid
- Succeeded by: Heartsill Ragon

Personal details
- Born: Henderson Madison Jacoway; November 7, 1870 Dardanelle, Arkansas, U.S.
- Died: August 4, 1947 (aged 76) Little Rock Arkansas, U.S.
- Resting place: Roselawn Cemetery, Arkansas
- Party: Democratic
- Education: Vanderbilt University
- Occupation: Attorney

Henderson Madison Jacoway (November 7, 1870 – August 4, 1947) was an American lawyer and politician who served six terms as a U.S. representative from Arkansas from 1911 to 1923.

== Early life and education ==
Born in Dardanelle, Arkansas to William Dodge Jacoway (judge for the Fifth Judicial Circuit) and Elizabeth D. Parks, Jacoway attended the common schools. He graduated from the Dardanelle High School in 1887, from the Winchester Normal College, Winchester, Tennessee, in 1892, and from the law department of Vanderbilt University, Nashville, Tennessee, in 1898. He was admitted to the bar in 1898 and commenced practice in Dardanelle.

== Political career ==
He was the secretary of the Dawes Commission, engaged in distributing the estates of the Five Civilized Tribes of Indians in the then Indian Territory.

He served as prosecuting attorney of the fifth judicial district 1904-1908. He served as a member of the State Democratic central committee 1910-1912.

=== Congress ===
Jacoway was elected as a Democrat to the Sixty-second and to the five succeeding Congresses (March 4, 1911 – March 3, 1923). He was not a candidate for renomination in 1922.

=== Later career and death ===
He moved to Little Rock, Arkansas, in 1922 and served as vice president of the People's Savings Bank from 1923 to 1929. He resumed the practice of law. Regional counsel of the Social Security Board for the States of Arkansas, Missouri, Oklahoma, and Kansas from 1936 to 1945.

He died in Little Rock, Arkansas, August 4, 1947. He was interred in Roselawn Cemetery.

U.S. House of Representatives
Preceded by Charles C. Reid	Member of the U.S. House of Representatives from Arkansas's 5th congressional district March 4, 1911 – March 3, 1923	Succeeded by Heartsill Ragon
