= United States District Court for the Western District of Arkansas =

U.S. federal district court in Arkansas

- (W.D. Ark.)
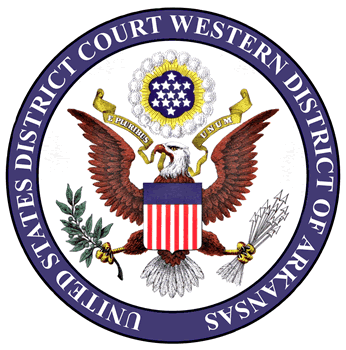
- Location: Judge Isaac C. Parker Federal Building (Fort Smith) More locations: El Dorado; John Paul Hammerschmidt Federal Building (Fayetteville); J. Smith Henley Federal Building (Harrison); Federal Building–U.S. Post Office and Court House (Hot Springs); United States Post Office and Courthouse (Texarkana)
- Appeals to: Eighth Circuit
- Established: March 3, 1851
- Judges: 3
- Chief Judge: Timothy L. Brooks

Officers of the court
- U.S. Attorney: Kevin Holmes
- U.S. Marshal: Gary Grimes
- www.arwd.uscourts.gov

The United States District Court for the Western District of Arkansas (in case citations, W.D. Ark.) is a federal court in the Eighth Circuit (except for patent claims and claims against the U.S. government under the Tucker Act, which are appealed to the Federal Circuit).

The District was established on March 3, 1851, with the division of the preceding United States District Court for the District of Arkansas into an Eastern and Western district.

The U.S. Courthouse & Post Office in Texarkana is shared with the Eastern District of Texas, making it the sole federal courthouse located in two states and a location of two federal districts.

The United States Attorney's Office for the Western District of Arkansas represents the United States in civil and criminal litigation in the court.

== Organization of the court ==
The United States District Court for the Western District of Arkansas is one of two federal judicial districts in Arkansas. Court for the District is held at El Dorado, Fayetteville, Fort Smith, Harrison, Hot Springs, and Texarkana.

El Dorado Division comprises the following counties: Ashley, Bradley, Calhoun, Columbia, Ouachita, and Union.

Fayetteville Division comprises the following counties: Benton, Madison, and Washington.

Fort Smith Division comprises the following counties: Crawford, Franklin, Johnson, Logan, Polk, Scott, and Sebastian.

Harrison Division comprises the following counties: Baxter, Boone, Carroll, Marion, Newton, and Searcy.

Hot Springs Division comprises the following counties: Clark, Garland, Hot Spring, Montgomery, and Pike.

Texarkana Division comprises the following counties: Hempstead, Howard, Lafayette, Little River, Miller, Nevada, and Sevier.

== Current judges ==
As of April 23, 2026:

#	Title	Judge	Duty station	Born	Term of service			Appointed by
#	Title	Judge	Duty station	Born	Active	Chief	Senior	Appointed by
25	Chief Judge	Timothy L. Brooks	Fayetteville	1964	2014–present	2025–present	—	Obama
26	District Judge	David Clay Fowlkes	Fort Smith	1978	2026–present	—	—	Trump
27	District Judge	John T. Shepherd	El Dorado	1987	2026–present	—	—	Trump
20	Senior Judge	Jimm Larry Hendren	inactive	1940	1992–2012	1997–2012	2012–present	G.H.W. Bush
22	Senior Judge	Robert T. Dawson	inactive	1938	1998–2009	—	2009–present	Clinton
23	Senior Judge	Paul K. Holmes III	inactive	1951	2011–2021	2012–2019	2021–present	Obama
24	Senior Judge	Susan O. Hickey	El Dorado	1955	2011–2026	2019–2025	2026–present	Obama

== Former judges ==
#	Judge	Born–died	Active service	Chief Judge	Senior status	Appointed by	Reason for termination
1	Daniel Ringo	1803–1873	1851–1861 (Note: Reassigned from the District of Arkansas. Jointly appointed to the Eastern and Western Districts of Arkansas)	—	—	Taylor/Operation of law	resignation
2	Henry Clay Caldwell	1832–1915	1864–1871 (Note: Jointly appointed to the Eastern and Western Districts of Arkansas)	—	—	Lincoln	reassignment
3	William Story	1843–1921	1871–1874	—	—	Grant	resignation
4	Isaac C. Parker	1838–1896	1875–1896	—	—	Grant	death
5	John Henry Rogers	1845–1911	1896–1911 (Note: Recess appointment; formally nominated on December 8, 1896, confirmed by the United States Senate on December 15, 1896, and received commission the same day)	—	—	Cleveland	death
6	Frank A. Youmans	1860–1932	1911–1932	—	—	Taft	death
7	Heartsill Ragon	1885–1940	1933–1940	—	—	F. Roosevelt	death
8	Harry Jacob Lemley	1883–1965	1939–1958	1948–1958	1958–1965	F. Roosevelt	death
9	John E. Miller	1888–1981	1941–1967	1958–1967	1967–1981	F. Roosevelt	death
10	J. Smith Henley	1917–1997	1959–1975	—	—	Eisenhower	elevation
11	Oren Harris	1903–1997	1965–1976	1967–1973	1976–1997	L. Johnson	death
12	Paul X. Williams	1908–1994	1967–1981	1973–1981	1981–1994	L. Johnson	death
13	Terry Shell	1922–1978	1975–1978	—	—	Ford	death
14	Elsijane Trimble Roy	1916–2007	1977–1989	—	1989–1990 (Note: From 1989 to 1990, Judge Roy served as a Senior Judge of the Eastern and Western Districts of Arkansas.)	Carter	reassignment
15	Richard S. Arnold	1936–2004	1978–1980	—	—	Carter	elevation
16	George Howard Jr.	1924–2007	1980–1990 (Note: From 1980 to 1990, Judge Howard was jointly appointed to the Eastern and Western Districts of Arkansas.)	—	—	Carter	reassignment
17	Hugh Franklin Waters	1932–2002	1981–1997	1981–1997	1997–2002	Reagan	death
18	Morris S. Arnold	1941–present	1985–1992	—	—	Reagan	elevation
19	Susan Webber Wright	1948–present	1990–1990 (Note: From 1990 to 1990, Judge Wright was jointly appointed to the Eastern and Western Districts of Arkansas.)	—	—	G.H.W. Bush	reassignment
21	Harry F. Barnes	1932–2019	1993–2008	—	2008–2019	Clinton	death

== Chief judges ==
Chief judges have administrative responsibilities with respect to their district court. Unlike the Supreme Court, where one justice is specifically nominated to be chief, the office of chief judge rotates among the district court judges. To be chief, a judge must have been in active service on the court for at least one year, be under the age of 65, and have not previously served as chief judge.

A vacancy is filled by the judge highest in seniority among the group of qualified judges. The chief judge serves for a term of seven years, or until age 70, whichever occurs first. The age restrictions are waived if no members of the court would otherwise be qualified for the position.

When the office was created in 1948, the chief judge was the longest-serving judge who had not elected to retire, on what has since 1958 been known as senior status, or declined to serve as chief judge. After August 6, 1959, judges could not become or remain chief after turning 70 years old. The current rules have been in operation since October 1, 1982.

== Succession of seats ==
Seat 1
Seat reassigned from District of Arkansas on March 3, 1851 by 9 Stat. 594 (concurrent with Eastern District)
Ringo	1851–1861
Caldwell	1864–1871
Seat reassigned solely to the Eastern District on March 3, 1871 by 16 Stat. 471

Seat 2
Seat established on March 3, 1871 by 16 Stat. 471
Story	1871–1874
Parker	1875–1896
Rogers	1896–1911
Youmans	1911–1932
Ragon	1933–1940
Miller	1941–1967
Williams	1967–1981
Waters	1981–1997
Dawson	1998–2009
Holmes III	2011–2021
Fowlkes	2026–present

Seat 3
Seat established on May 31, 1938 by 52 Stat. 584 (concurrent with Eastern District)
Lemley	1939–1958
Henley	1959–1975
Shell	1975–1978
R. Arnold	1978–1980
Howard, Jr.	1980–1990
Seat reassigned solely to Eastern District on December 1, 1990 by 104 Stat. 5089

Seat 4
Seat established on May 19, 1961 by 75 Stat. 80 (concurrent with Eastern District)
Harris	1965–1976
Roy	1977–1989
Wright	1990
Seat reassigned solely to Eastern District on December 1, 1990 by 104 Stat. 5089

Seat 5
Seat established on July 10, 1984 by 98 Stat. 333 (temporary)
Seat made permanent on December 1, 1990 by 104 Stat. 5089
M. Arnold	1985–1992
Barnes	1993–2008
Hickey	2011–2026
Shepherd	2026–present

Seat 6
Seat established on December 1, 1990 by 104 Stat. 5089
Hendren	1992–2012
Brooks	2014–present

== U.S. Attorney ==
- Jesse Turner 1851–53
- Alfred M. Wilson 1853–61
- Granville Wilcox 1861–69
- James H. Huckleberry 1869–72
- Newton J. Temple 1872–75
- W. H. H. Clayton 1875–85
- Monti H. Sandels 1885–89
- W. H. H. Clayton 1889–93
- James F. Read 1893–97
- Thomas H. Barnes 1897–98
- James K. Barnes 1898–1909
- Lafayette W. Gregg 1909
- John I. Worthington 1909–13 J.
- Virgil Bourland 1913–17
- Emon O. Mahoney 1917–20
- James Seaborn Holt 1920
- Steve Carrigan 1920
- Samuel S. Langley 1921–30
- William N. Ivie 1930–34
- Clinton R. Barry 1934–46
- Respess S. Wilson 1946–53
- Charles W. Atkinson 1953–61
- Charles M. Conway 1961–69
- Robert E. Johnson 1969
- Bethel B. Larey 1969–73
- Robert E. Johnson 1973–77
- Larry R. McCord 1977–82
- W. Asa Hutchinson 1982–85
- J. Michael Fitzhugh 1985–93
- Paul K. Holmes 1993–2001
- Bill Cromwell (Acting) 2001
- Thomas C Gean 2001–2003
- Bill Cromwell 2003–2004
- Robert C. Balfe 2004–2008
- Deborah or Debbie Groom (Acting) 2008 – 2010
- Conner Eldridge 2010–2015
- Kenneth Elser (Acting) 2015–2018
- Duane Kees 2018–2020
- David Clay Fowlkes 2020–2026
- Kevin Holmes 2026-Present

== See also ==
- Courts of Arkansas
- List of current United States district judges
- List of United States federal courthouses in Arkansas
