= University of Arkansas School of Law =

Law school in Fayetteville, Arkansas, US

- Parent school: University of Arkansas
- Established: 1924; 102 years ago
- School type: Public
- Endowment: US$84.2 million
- Parent endowment: US$939.8 million
- Dean: Katheleen Guzman
- Location: Fayetteville, Arkansas, United States; 36°04′11″N 94°10′29″W
- Enrollment: 410
- Faculty: 58
- USNWR ranking: 100th (tie) (2026)
- Website: law.uark.edu
- ABA profile: Arkansas School of Law Profile

The University of Arkansas School of Law is the law school of the University of Arkansas in Fayetteville, Arkansas, a state university. It has around 445 students enrolled in its Juris Doctor (J.D.) and Master of Law (LL.M) programs and is home to the nation's first LL.M in agricultural and food law program. The School of Law is one of two law schools in the state of Arkansas; the other is the William H. Bowen School of Law (University of Arkansas at Little Rock).

According to the ABA disclosure, of the 115 University of Arkansas School of Law graduates from the class of 2025, 108 took the bar exam after graduation. Seven graduates from previous years who had not yet taken the bar exam joined them, which added up to 115 first-time takers. Of those 115 first-time takers, 92 passed the bar to make for an 80% bar passage rate, matching the bar passage rate of 2024.

== History ==
The School of Law was founded in 1924. The founding dean was Julian Waterman, a Dumas, Arkansas native and University of Chicago Law School graduate who led the school through its first 19 years, until his death in 1943.

The School met initially in the bottom floor of Old Main, and was approved by the American Bar Association two years later, in 1926. In 1927, the first class, consisting of ten students, graduated.

Over the next several decades, as the law school grew in size, it moved to larger accommodations. The 1930s saw a move to the Chemistry Building just to the southeast of Old Main, and then into Waterman Hall, the first dedicated law school construction project, in the 1950s. The latter half of the 20th century saw additions added to Waterman Hall to form the Robert A. Leflar Law Center.

In 1947, the law school offered admission to L. Clifford Davis, under conditions that would not allow him to be in any room at the same room as white students, including classrooms, restrooms, and the library. Davis chose to instead to take tuition money from the state to attend Howard University, in Washington, D.C. On February 2, 1948, the University of Arkansas School of Law became the first Southern white university to accept an African-American student since Reconstruction. Silas H. Hunt, a World War II veteran who had been wounded in the Battle of the Bulge and following the conclusion of the war had completed an undergraduate degree in English at Arkansas Agricultural, Mechanical & Normal College applied to multiple law schools in 1947. He chose to seek entry at the Arkansas School of Law to challenge the system of racial segregation established in Arkansas at the time. Accompanied by his attorney, Howard Flowers, Hunt met with the dean of the law school, Robert A. Leflar, who reviewed Hunt's application. Leflar was impressed and accepted Hunt's application to the law school. For a semester, Hunt attended the law school until succumbing to illness, and dying in a veteran's hospital on April 22, 1949, in Springfield, Missouri.

Following Hunt's successful entry into the law school, five more African-American students applied and were accepted into the law school: George Williford Boyce Haley, who went on to become a United States Ambassador to The Gambia; Wiley Branton, who served as dean at the Howard University School of Law; Jackie L. Shropshire; Chris Mercer; and George Howard, Jr., who later became the first black United States district court judge in Arkansas. Collectively they are known as the "Six Pioneers." In June, 1951, Shropshire became the first to graduate. In 1958 Branton argued Cooper v. Aaron in front of the Supreme Court, which forced the integration of Little Rock Central High School.

Silas H. Hunt Hall, located adjacent to the Robert A. Leflar Law Center, honors Silas Hunt, in addition, to a historical marker in front of the law school.

In 2007, a 64,000-square-foot (5,900 m^{2}) addition to the Leflar Law Center was completed, expanding on the Young Law Library, as well as adding a coffee shop, four classrooms, a technologically equipped courtroom, and a formal entrance hall.

In January 2026, after a public search for a new dean, Emily Suski, an academic from the University of South Carolina was offered the position, but had the offer rescinded after it became known that she had signed an amicus curiae brief in support of trans athletes in the West Virginia v. B. P. J. Supreme Court case. Republican state officials including governor Sarah Huckabee Sanders voiced support for the decision.

== Facilities ==
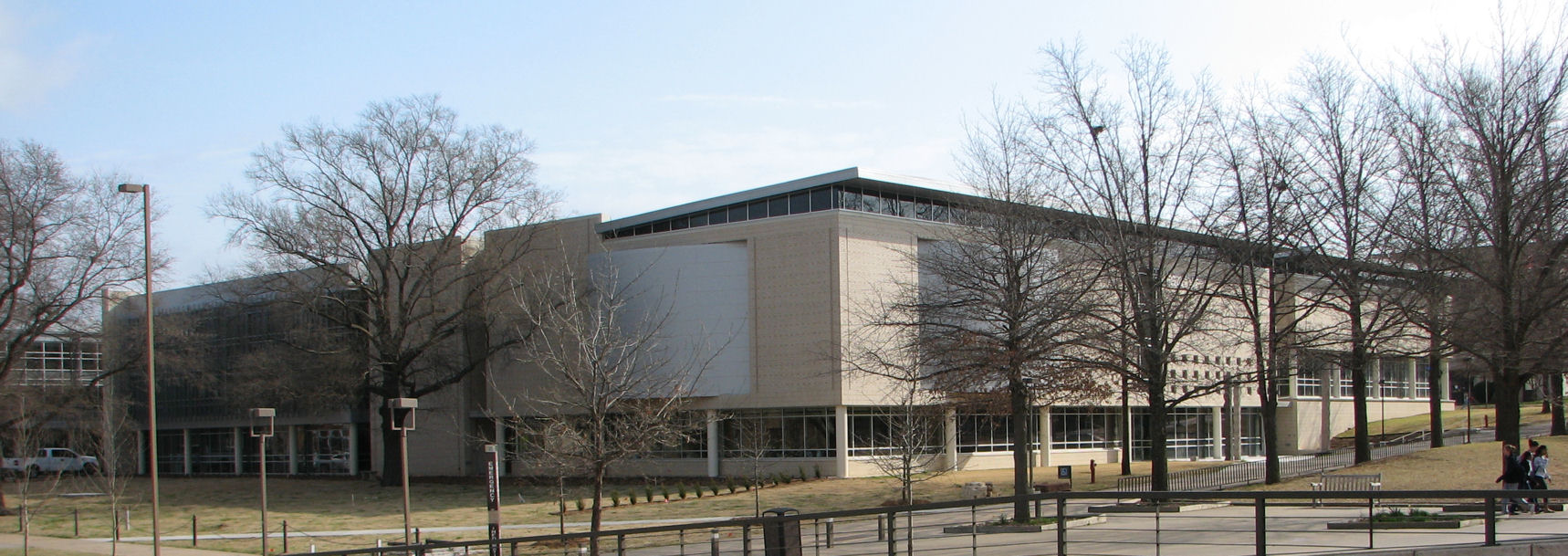
New southwest addition of law school

The University of Arkansas School of Law is self-contained within the Robert A. Leflar Law Center on the campus of the University of Arkansas in Fayetteville, which is located in Washington County in Northwest Arkansas at the edge of the Ozarks.

The law center is a square facility with four wings around a courtyard. It consists of approximately 64,000 square feet (5,900 m^{2}), a courtroom, classrooms, and the Young Law Library. In addition to legal library resources, the Young Law Library includes a coffeeshop, computer lab and lounge area.

== Legal Clinic ==
The legal clinic of the law school has been in operation for more than forty years, offering free legal services to non-profits, small businesses, cooperatives, government agencies, and individuals unable to afford legal representation. The goal of the Legal Clinic, which offers the services of student attorneys, is firstly to train competently students in specific areas of legal practice encountered in every day law practice; and secondly to provide an opportunity for students to refine basic lawyering skills, such as counseling, interviewing and persuasive legal writing.

=== Clinics ===
- Civil Litigation and Advocacy Clinic
- Human Trafficking Clinic
- Immigration Clinic
- Community and Rural Enterprise Development Clinic
- Criminal Practice Clinic

== Journals ==
The School of Law publishes two legal journals.:

- The Arkansas Law Review is student-edited and published on a quarterly basis and distributed statewide to members of the Arkansas Bar, as well as legal libraries throughout the nation.
- The Journal of Food Law & Policy is the first student edited legal journal dedicated to food law in the nation and is published twice a year.

== Ranking and recognition ==
The 2026 edition of U.S. News & World Report's "Best Law Schools" ranked the Arkansas School of Law as 100th overall. US News also ranked Arkansas School of Law's legal writing and research 57th and tax law as 89th in the country. LawSchool100.com ranked the Arkansas School of Law as 88th overall in its 2010 ranking of law schools. The Arkansas School of Law was also ranked 73rd overall according to the 2010 ranking by the AALS. The ILRG ranked the Arkansas School of Law 71st overall in its 2009-2010 ranking of law schools. The ILRG also has numerous other categories and ranks the Arkansas School of Law as the 62nd most selective law school, 65th for job placement before graduation, 55th for job placement after 9 months, 77th for best bar passer rates among first time takers, 98th when ranking the school versus the state average for bar passage rates and 72nd for student to faculty ratio. Law & Politics' 2010 ranking of law schools ranked the Arkansas School of Law 139th overall. Leiter's ranking of most desirable law schools lists Arkansas as the 54th most desirable law school in the country. Law.com ranks Arkansas as 100th overall for best job placement and employment trends into "BigLaw". In 2010, The Hylton Rankings place the Arkansas School of Law 86th overall among all law schools. The Arkansas School of Law ranks 65th overall for percentage of class that obtain federal clerkships and 85th for total number of students obtaining federal clerkships. Brian Koppen's Law School Advocacy ranks the Arkansas School of Law as 46th overall. The 2010 National Moot Court rankings place the Arkansas School of Law at 13th overall.

== Admissions ==
| Enrolled | 135 |
| GPA (75/25) | 3.87/3.54 |
| LSAT (75/25) | 161/155 |
| Acceptance rate | 26.63% |

During the 2024 application period, the University of Arkansas School of Law admitted 26.63% of applicants.The full-time enrollment from the 2025 first-year class totaled 135. The 75th, 50th, and 25th percentiles for the LSAT were 161, 158, and 155 respectively. The 75th, 50th, and 25th percentiles for GPA were 3.87, 3.71, and 3.54 respectively.

== Career placement ==
Of 119 graduates of the University of Arkansas School of Law class of 2025, 89 were employed with bar admission required or anticipated; 87 were employed full-time, and 2 were employed part-time. Fourteen graduates secured full-time employment through a J.D. Advantage job. Two graduates, one full-time and one part-time, were hired for professional positions, and two other graduates, one full-time and one part-time, were hired for other positions. Six enrolled in further graduate studies. One was unemployed but not seeking a job, and three were unemployed but still searching for employment. Two graduates had an unknown employment status.

== Costs ==
According to the 2025 ABA disclosure, the cost of tuition for a full-time student at the University of Arkansas School of Law was $541 per credit for Arkansas residents and $1,304 for non-residents. The annual fees for both residents and non-residents was $2,543.

For living expenses for single students, the estimated cost of living on campus, off campus, or at home was $22,194. For living expenses for single students living on a military base, the estimated cost of living expenses was $12,594.

Of 368 total students, 87% (320 students) received a grant.

- 177 students (48%) received a grant covering less than half of tuition costs
- 135 students (37%) received a grant covering between half and full tuition costs
- 0 students (0%) received a grant covering the full cost of tuition
- 8 students (2%) received a grant covering more than the cost of tuition

The 75th, 50th, and 25th percentile for grant amounts are $11,000, $9,000, and $5,500 respectively.

The School of Law does not award conditional scholarships that may be decreased or eliminated based on law school academic performance other than remaining in good standing.

== People ==
=== Notable faculty ===
- Carl Edward Bailey, governor of Arkansas 1937–1941
- Bill Clinton and Hillary Clinton both served as faculty at the law school during the 1970s
- J. William Fulbright, US Senator; served as a faculty member at the school
- Mark R. Killenbeck, the Wylie A. Davis Distinguished Professor of Law

=== Notable alumni ===
- Beryl Anthony Jr. (born 1938), lawyer and politician representing Arkansas's 4th congressional district in the U.S. House of Representatives 1979–1993
- Morris S. Arnold (born 1941), professor, historian, and judge of the United States Court of Appeals for the Eighth Circuit
- Kristine Baker (born 1971), lawyer and judge the United States District Court for the Eastern District of Arkansas 2012–present
- Bob Ballinger (born 1974), lawyer and politician representing part of Northwest Arkansas in the Arkansas House of Representatives 2013–present
- Mike Beebe (born 1946), lawyer and politician representing White County in the Arkansas Senate 1983–2003, Attorney General of Arkansas 2003–2007, governor of Arkansas 2007–2015
- Ed Bethune (born 1935), lawyer and politician representing Arkansas's 2nd congressional district in the U.S. House of Representatives 1979–1985
- Will Bond (born 1970), lawyer and politician representing part of Little Rock in the Arkansas House of Representatives and Arkansas Senate 2003–2008, 2017–present
- Timothy L. Brooks, lawyer and judge of the United States District Court for the Western District of Arkansas 2014–present
- Winston Bryant (born 1938), former secretary of state, lieutenant governor, and attorney general of Arkansas
- Francis Cherry, judge and politician who served as Governor of Arkansas
- Paul Danielson, Associate Justice of the Arkansas Supreme Court 2006–2016
- Jay Dickey (born 1939), lawyer and politician representing Arkansas's 4th congressional district in the U.S. House of Representatives 1993–2001
- Clay Ford (Class of 1978), politician representing Pulaski in the Arkansas House of Representatives 1975–1976, and Santa Rosa in the Florida House of Representatives 2007–2013
- Vince Foster, Deputy White House Counsel 1993
- James Hannah (born 1944), Arkansas Supreme Court Chief Justice 2005–2015 (left early due to health issues); served as Chairman and President, Conference of Chief Justices; nominated by President Barack Obama to Board of Directors of the State Justice Institute 2010–2012; published by Albany Law Review in 2007
- Richard C. Harding (Class of 1979), Judge Advocate General for the United States Air Force
- Pat Hays, mayor of North Little Rock, Arkansas
- Ben C. Henley (1907–1987), chairman of the Arkansas Republican Party 1955–1962
- George Howard, Jr. (1924–2007), United States federal judge
- Silas Hunt (1922-1949) First black student accepted by the school.
- Asa Hutchinson, U.S. representative from Arkansas's 3rd congressional district 1997–2001, and governor of Arkansas 2013–2023
- Timothy Chad Hutchinson (Class of 1999, born 1974), lawyer and politician representing part of Benton County in the Arkansas House of Representatives 2005–2011
- Richard Mays (born 1943), member Arkansas House of Representatives (1973–1977); justice of the Arkansas Supreme Court (1979–1980)
- Hayes McClerkin (born 1931), politician representing the Texarkana area in the Arkansas House of Representatives 1961–1970
- John Ellis Martineau (Class of 1899), governor of Arkansas 1927–1928; judge of the United States District Court for the Eastern District of Arkansas
- Chris Mercer, the first African-American deputy state prosecutor in the South, one of the "six pioneers" who integrated the University of Arkansas Law School.
- John D. Raffaelli, American lobbyist
- Lee Seamster, Chief Justice of the Arkansas Supreme Court 1955–1956
- Mark Stodola, Mayor of Little Rock 2007–2018
- Boyd Anderson Tackett, politician representing Arkansas's 4th congressional district in the U.S. House of Representatives 1949–1953
- Tom Jefferson Terral (Class of 1910), governor of Arkansas 1925–1927
- David Whitaker, politician representing the Fayetteville area in the Arkansas House of Representatives 2013–present
- Marshall Wright, lawyer and politician representing St. Francis, Woodruff, Lee, and Monroe counties in the Arkansas House of Representatives 2011–present
- Susan Webber Wright (born 1948), United States District Judge
