= 1932 Arkansas gubernatorial election =

- November 8, 1932
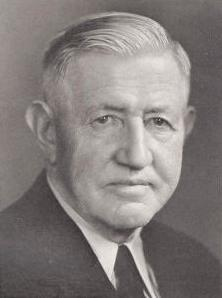

Nominee	Junius Marion Futrell	James Livesay
Party	Democratic	Republican
Popular vote	200,612	19,713
Percentage	90.44%	8.89%
- County results Futrell: 50–60% 60–70% 70–80% 80–90% >90%
Governor before election
Harvey Parnell
Democratic
Elected Governor
Junius Marion Futrell
Democratic

The 1932 Arkansas gubernatorial election was held on November 8, 1932, to elect the governor of Arkansas, concurrently with the election to Arkansas's Class III U.S. Senate seat, as well as other elections to the United States Senate in other states and elections to the United States House of Representatives and various state and local elections.

Incumbent Democratic governor Harvey Parnell had won office in 1928, and reelection in 1930. During this period, it was customary for governors to be reelected to a second term, but only one governor, Jeff Davis, had served three terms since Reconstruction. In the Solid South, winning the Democratic primary was tantamount to election, a trend that resulted in Democratic control of the Arkansas Governor's Mansion from 1874 to 1967. Chancery judge Junius Marion Futrell won a seven-candidate primary, and was nominated by the party despite insisting he did not want the position. The Republicans nominated James O. Livesay, a lawyer from Foreman in Little River County, who had also been the gubernatorial nominee against Harvey Parnell in 1930.

Futrell defeated Livesay in a landslide election, and would win reelection in 1934. Though the office remained within the Democratic party, the election represented a realignment in favor of the conservative wing of the party. Futrell was the most conservative governor elected in decades, with 1932 marking the end of the Progressive Era in Arkansas.

== Democratic primary ==
The Democratic primary carried significant weight during the Solid South period, with a primary win essentially tantamount to election. The Republicans selected their candidate in April at their state convention, and many Republicans also voted in the Democrat's open primary. Illustrating the strength of Democratic hegemony, the Fayetteville Daily Democrat published a photo of Futrell after the primary under the headline "Next Governor", three months before the general election. The caption claimed Futrell "possibly will be conceded the office by members of all parties".

Current governor Harvey Parnell had recently completed two terms, and declined to run for reelection. Though Parnell had enjoyed early popularity as a reform governor, he had become deeply unpopular following the start of the Great Depression, and the perceived flaws of the Martineau Road Law, which he was instrumental in passing as Lieutenant Governor of Arkansas. By February 1933, the situation had devolved so far, the Arkansas House of Representatives adopted a resolution describing the Parnell administration as "the most corrupt since the days of reconstruction and the most extravagant and wasteful in the history of the state". Many Arkansans blamed Parnell for their hardships in the Great Depression, and his unpopularity caused candidates to dodge his endorsement throughout the contest.

=== Candidates ===
A diverse group of state and local politicians sought the nomination, with as many as ten candidates running in the early months. The broad field began to narrow a month before the August primary, with campaign rhetoric and candidate mudslinging also rising. On primary day, August 9, 1932, there was a seven-man field, with four serious candidates: Dwight H. Blackwood of Osceola, chairman of the powerful Arkansas State Highway Commission, chancery judge Junius Marion Futrell of Paragould, former governor Tom J. Terral, and circuit judge A.B. Priddy of Russellville.

==== Declared ====
- Dwight H. Blackwood, member of the Arkansas State Highway Commission, former Mississippi County Sheriff and Arkansas State Treasurer
- Junius Marion Futrell, chancery judge, former member of the Arkansas House of Representatives, acting governor for five months during 1913
- A.B. Priddy, circuit judge from Russellville, managed Brooks Hays 1928 gubernatorial campaign
- Howard A. Reed, state comptroller
- Tom J. Terral, former governor and Arkansas Secretary of State
- Winston P. Wilson of Little Rock
- Arley Woodrow of Mena

Blackwood's campaign was managed by Lee Seamster, a prominent judge from Fayetteville. Futrell's campaign was managed by C.E. Johnson, a chancery judge from Texarkana, and Griffin Smith, who would become an associate justice on the Arkansas Supreme Court.

==== Withdrew ====
- S. Marcus Bone, circuit judge from Batesville (endorsed Terral)
- Leonard D. Caudle, former member of the Arkansas House of Representatives from Greenwood (endorsed Terral)
- C.A. Christian, doctor from Dardanelle
- Dan W. Johnson, former representative from Johnson County
- Richard A. Mann, circuit judge from Little Rock
- Charles A. Walls, former member of the Arkansas State Senate from Lonoke

==== Declined ====
- Carl E. Bailey, prosecuting attorney from Little Rock
- William Lee Cazort, Parnell's first lieutenant governor, who had challenged him in the 1930 Democratic primary
- Brooks Hays, assistant Arkansas Attorney General from 1925 to 1927
- Sam Rorex, of Russellville
- Lee Seamster, chancery judge, former member of the Arkansas House of Representatives from Fayetteville (endorsed Blackwood)
- Lawrence Elery Wilson, Parnell's second lieutenant governor

=== Results ===
Public sentiment toward the Parnell administration turned the 1932 election debate toward corruption and good government reforms. One of the main issues was corruption at the Arkansas Highway Department, which is directed by the State Highway Commission, chaired by Blackwood. Public schools were also an issue in the race.

Priddy promised "a brand new deal", borrowing the term from President Franklin Roosevelt's New Deal. Priddy strongly opposed Blackwood's continued service on the Highway Commission, making a campaign promise to unseat him if elected. Blackwood had "boasted" he could not be removed from the Highway Commission unless indicted. Though Priddy had never supported the Parnell administration, Priddy was known as the governor's favored choice, though he did not give an official endorsement. Priddy also accused former governor Terral of aligning with Blackwood, saying "the difference would be in name only if either should be elected governor". Futrell had previously served on an audit committee tasked with investigating the Highway Commission, but resigned before publishing a report. Priddy used his resignation to tar and feather Futrell, and link him to the Blackwood and Parnell as corrupt.

Futrell was a reluctant candidate, saying after winning the Democratic primary, "had no ambition to become governor and would prefer to serve out my time as chancellor among the people who know me best". A planter from Paragould in Northeast Arkansas, Futrell had significant state government experience, but retained everyman credentials, nicknamed "the commoner from Paragould". Futrell emphasized retrenchment and good government reforms, including proposal of a constitutional amendment to require a balanced budget. Arkansas was facing a $15 million shortfall in 1933–1934, and the repayment of $146 million of highway bonds under the Martineau Road Law now seemed insurmountable. Futrell planned to modify the funding of highways upon election to ensure a balanced budget. As runoff elections were not required at the time, Futrell won by a solid plurality.

Democratic primary, 1932
Party	Candidate	Votes	%
Democratic	Junius Marion Futrell	124,139	44.0
Democratic	Tom J. Terral	59,066	20.9
Democratic	A.B. Priddy	37,134	13.2
Democratic	Dwight H. Blackwood	33,147	11.8
Democratic	Howard Reed	12,117	4.3
Democratic	W.P. Wilson	7,709	2.7
Democratic	Other candidates	5,188	1.8
Democratic	Arley Woodrow	3,541	1.3
Total votes		282,041	100.0

The Democratic primary was a dramatic fight played out via accusations in the press, and ultimately widened major rifts in the party. Though Parnell and Blackwood were already political rivals, the battle continued to escalate. Allegations of corruption flew among several of the candidates, positing other candidates as "members of the machine" or colluding as a political "gang". Parnell was initially thought to run for Senate, but declined and decided to retire from politics, but remained active in the 1932 primary. On July 24, reports emerged that Governor Parnell had switched his support from Priddy to Futrell. Parnell issued a statement, saying "his only interest in the present campaign was to defeat Dwight H. Blackwood". Following Futrell's win, Parnell removed Howard Reed from his state comptroller's position, allegedly for refusing to withdraw as a gubernatorial candidate. Parnell appointed Griffin Smith, manager of Futrell's campaign, to replace Reed. Four of Arkansas's constitutional officers condemned the firing in a statement, calling it "untimely to say the least".

Futrell tried to strike a conciliatory tone, saying "in the discharge of my duties as governor, all bitterness of the controversy will be forgotten, and the earnest co-operation of those who opposed me, and those who supported me, is necessary". He also condemned the overheated rhetoric of the campaign, saying "one thing has been definitely established: A campaign of slander and misrepresentation cannot succeed."

The Democratic state convention was held September 8–10 in Hot Springs. Representative of the conservative wing having taken control of the convention, it adopted as first plank of the party platform, "drastic curtailment of government expenditures and other reforms".

== Republican convention ==
Republicans did not hold primaries in Arkansas until 1958, instead nominating their candidates at the state convention. The Republican convention was held in Little Rock on April 26, 1932. James O. Livesay, a lawyer and judge from Foreman, and Republican candidate for governor in 1930, was nominated as the Republican gubernatorial candidate.

== Third parties ==
=== Candidates ===
==== Declared ====
- Clay Faulks (Liberty and Socialist), of Mena
- H.C. Coney (Communist) of England

== General election ==
Turnout was expected to be high, mostly due to five constitutional amendments and three initiated acts listed on the November 1932 ballot, all of which were defeated at the polls. It was the longest ballot in Arkansas to date. On election day, turnout broke state records, exceeding even optimistic predictions.

=== Results ===
Arkansas gubernatorial election, 1932
Party	Candidate	Votes	%
Democratic	Junius Marion Futrell	200,612	90.44
Republican	James O. Livesay	19,713	8.89
Liberty	Clay Faulks	911	0.41
Socialist	Clay Faulks	461	0.21
Communist	H.C. Coney	174	0.08
Total votes		221,817	100.0
Democratic hold			
