= 1926 United States gubernatorial elections =

← 1925	November 2, 1926; October 5, 1926 (AR); September 13, 1926 (ME)	1927 →

33 governorships
	Majority party	Minority party
Party	Republican	Democratic
Seats before	24	24
Seats after	26	22
Seat change	▲2	▼2
Seats up	18	15
Seats won	20	13
- Democratic gain Democratic hold Republican gain Republican hold

United States gubernatorial elections were held in 1926, in 33 states, concurrent with the House and Senate elections, on November 2, 1926. Elections took place on October 5 in Arkansas, and September 13 in Maine.

In South Carolina, the governor was elected to a four-year term for the first time, instead of a two-year term. In Maryland, the election was held in an even-numbered year for the first time, having previously been held in the odd numbered year preceding the United States presidential election year.

== Results ==
State	Incumbent	Party	Status	Opposing candidates
Alabama	William W. Brandon	Democratic	Term-limited, Democratic victory	Bibb Graves (Democratic) 81.22% J. A. Bingham (Republican) 18.78%
Arizona	George W. P. Hunt	Democratic	Re-elected, 50.25%	Elias S. Clark (Republican) 49.75%
Arkansas (held, 5 October 1926)	Tom Terral	Democratic	Defeated in Democratic primary, Democratic victory	John E. Martineau (Democratic) 76.45% Drew Bowers (Republican) 23.56%
California	Friend Richardson	Republican	Defeated in Republican primary, Republican victory	Clement C. Young (Republican) 71.22% Justus S. Wardell (Democratic) 24.69% Upton Sinclair (Socialist) 4.02% Scattering 0.08%
Colorado	Clarence Morley	Republican	Retired, Democratic victory	William H. Adams (Democratic) 59.84% Oliver Henry Nelson Shoup (Republican) 38.11% Frank Cass (Farmer Labor) 1.28% Edward F. Wright (Socialist) 0.49% William R. Dietrich (Communist) 0.19% Barney Haughey (Commonwealth Land) 0.10%
Connecticut	John H. Trumbull	Republican	Re-elected, 63.58%	Charles G. Morris (Democratic) 35.37% Karl C. Jursek (Socialist) 1.06%
Georgia	Clifford Walker	Democratic	Term-limited, Democratic victory	Lamartine G. Hardman (Democratic) 100.00% (Democratic primary run-off results); Lamartine G. Hardman 57.33% John N. Holder 42.67%
Idaho	Charles C. Moore	Republican	Retired, Republican victory	H. C. Baldridge (Republican) 51.05% W. Scott Hall (Progressive) 28.36% Asher B. Wilson (Democratic) 20.59%
Iowa	John Hammill	Republican	Re-elected, 71.51%	Alex R. Miller (Democratic) 28.50%
Kansas	Benjamin S. Paulen	Republican	Re-elected, 63.31%	Jonathan M. Davis (Democratic) 35.30% H. Hilfrich (Socialist) 1.39%
Maine (held, 13 September 1926)	Ralph Owen Brewster	Republican	Re-elected, 55.52%	Ernest L. McLean (Democratic) 44.48%
Maryland	Albert C. Ritchie	Democratic	Re-elected, 57.93%	Addison E. Mullikin (Republican) 41.37% P. Gustave Dill (Socialist) 0.70%
Massachusetts	Alvan Tufts Fuller	Republican	Re-elected, 58.79%	William A. Gaston (Democratic) 40.25% Walter S. Hutchins (Socialist) 0.47% Lewis Marks (Workers) 0.30% Samuel Leger (Socialist Labor) 0.20%
Michigan	Alex J. Groesbeck	Republican	Defeated in Republican primary, Republican victory	Fred W. Green (Republican) 63.35% William A. Comstock (Democratic) 36.01% Frank E. Titus (Prohibition) 0.40% William Reynolds (Workers) 0.24%
Minnesota	Theodore Christianson	Republican	Re-elected, 56.49%	Magnus Johnson (Farmer-Labor) 38.09% Alfred Jaques (Democratic) 5.43%
Nebraska	Adam McMullen	Republican	Re-elected, 49.82%	Charles W. Bryan (Democratic) 48.99% Roy M. Harrop (Progressive) 1.19%
Nevada	James G. Scrugham	Democratic	Defeated, 47.00%	Frederick B. Balzar (Republican) 53.00%
New Hampshire	John Gilbert Winant	Republican	Defeated in Republican primary, Republican victory	Huntley N. Spaulding (Republican) 59.70% Eaton D. Sargent (Democratic) 40.30%
New Mexico	Arthur T. Hannett	Democratic	Defeated, 48.15%	Richard C. Dillon (Republican) 51.60% Q. M. Bixler (Independent) 0.25%
New York	Alfred E. Smith	Democratic	Re-elected, 52.30%	Ogden L. Mills (Republican) 43.80% Jacob Panken (Socialist) 2.87% Charles Manierre (Prohibition) 0.73% Benjamin Gitlow (Workers) 0.19% Jeremiah D. Crowley (Socialist Labor) 0.12%
North Dakota	Arthur G. Sorlie	Republican	Re-elected, 81.74%	David M. Holmes (Democratic) 15.15% Ralph Ingerson (Farmer Labor) 3.10%
Ohio	A. Victor Donahey	Democratic	Re-elected, 50.33%	Myers Y. Cooper (Republican) 49.13% Joseph W. Sharts (Socialist) 0.43% Walter Freeman (Socialist Labor) 0.11%
Oklahoma	Martin E. Trapp	Democratic	Term-limited, Democratic victory	Henry S. Johnston (Democratic) 54.90% Omer K. Benedict (Republican) 44.22% John Franing (Farmer Labor) 0.42% E. H. H. Gates (Socialist) 0.35% Ed Boyle (Independent) 0.11%
Oregon	Walter M. Pierce	Democratic	Defeated, 41.37%	Isaac L. Patterson (Republican) 53.14% H. H. Stallard (Independent) 5.49%
Pennsylvania	Gifford Pinchot	Republican	Term-limited, Republican victory	John S. Fisher (Republican) 73.34% Eugene C. Bonniwell (Democratic) 24.29% George L. Pennock (Prohibition) 1.30% John W. Slayton (Socialist) 0.78% H. W. Hicks (Workers) 0.22% Julian P. Hickok (Commonwealth Land) 0.06% Scattering 0.01%
Rhode Island	Aram J. Pothier	Republican	Re-elected, 53.90%	Joseph H. Gainer (Democratic) 45.66% Peter McDermott (Socialist Labor) 0.45%
South Carolina	Thomas Gordon McLeod	Democratic	Term-limited, Democratic victory	John Gardiner Richards (Democratic) 100.00% (Democratic primary run-off results); John Gardiner Richards 58.20% Ibra Charles Blackwood 41.80%
South Dakota	Carl Gunderson	Republican	Defeated, 40.32%	William J. Bulow (Democratic) 47.38% Tom Ayres (Farmer Labor) 6.51% John E. Hipple (Independent) 5.79%
Tennessee	Austin Peay	Democratic	Re-elected, 64.69%	Watler White (Republican) 35.20% P. W. Williams (Independent) 0.12%
Texas	Miriam A. Ferguson	Democratic	Defeated in Democratic primary, Democratic victory	Daniel Moody (Democratic) 86.75% H. H. Haines (Republican) 12.96% M. A. Smith (Socialist) 0.29%
Vermont	Franklin S. Billings	Republican	Retired, Republican victory	John Eliakim Weeks (Republican) 60.85% Herbert C. Comings (Democratic) 39.13% Scattering 0.02%
Wisconsin	John J. Blaine	Republican	Retired to run for U.S. Senate, Republican victory	Fred R. Zimmerman (Republican) 63.47% Charles B. Perry (Independent) 13.84% Virgil H. Cady (Democratic) 13.14% Herman O. Kent (Socialist) 7.29% David W. Emerson (Prohibition) 1.33% Alex Gordon (Socialist Labor) 0.83% Scattering 0.11%
Wyoming	Nellie Tayloe Ross	Democratic	Defeated, 48.95%	Frank C. Emerson (Republican) 50.90% William B. Guthrie (Radical) 0.15%

== See also ==
- 1926 United States elections
  - 1926 United States Senate elections
  - 1926 United States House of Representatives elections
