= 1932 Arkansas elections =

Arkansas held a general election on November 8, 1932. At the top of the ticket, Franklin D. Roosevelt won the state handily in his successful bid to become the 32nd President of the United States. Arkansans elected Hattie Caraway to the United States Senate, the first woman elected to a full term in history. For the United States House of Representatives, Bill Cravens, a former Representative from 1907 to 1913, returned to politics and defeated a wide field in the Arkansas 4th. Tilman Parks defeated several challengers to retain the Arkansas 7th. All of Arkansas's statewide constitutional offices were up for reelection, including governor. Incumbent Harvey Parnell declined to run for reelection, and was supplanted by Junius Marion Futrell.

During the Solid South, the Democratic Party held firm control of virtually every office in The South, including Arkansas. Winning the Democratic primary was considered tantamount to election, with several different factions of the party battling in the open primaries. The election was held a few years into the Great Depression, and Americans and Arkansans battling steep unemployment and poverty sought politicians and policies to remedy the economic malaise.

Though the state elected big government-liberal Franklin Roosevelt, Futrell represented a realignment toward severe cuts and retrenchment in the governor's mansion. Conservative, small-government Democrats also took state senate and state representative positions across Arkansas. Though 1932 is considered a realignment election nationally toward Democrats and larger government, in Arkansas, Futrell was the most conservative governor elected in decades, marking a shift from Progressive Era-type politicians in Arkansas.

== President ==
Roosevelt defeated Herbert Hoover by an 85.96% to 12.91% margin in Arkansas, earning the state's nine electoral votes. His New Deal was very popular in the state, which was struggling with high unemployment and poor agricultural prospects, which represented most of Arkansas's economy.

== Federal ==
=== United States Senate ===
Thaddeus H. Caraway held Arkansas's Class III senate from 1920 until his death on November 6, 1931. Per the custom at the time, his wife Hattie Caraway was appointed to serve the remainder of his term. Though she faced several primary challengers, Caraway became the first woman to be elected to a full term in the Senate in November 1932 by an 89.5% to 10.5% margin over John W. White, the Republican.

Caraway defeated Vincent Miles, O. L. Bodenhamer, William G. Hutton, William F. Kirby, Melbourne Martin, and Charles Brough.

== State ==
=== Governor ===
County results, gubernatorial Futrell: 50–60% 60–70% 70–80% 80–90% 90%+ Livesay: Did not win any counties

=== Lieutenant governor ===
Incumbent lieutenant governor Lawrence Wilson faced a six-way primary battle for reelection. Though Democratic voters had historically given two two-year terms to faithful politicians, Wilson had become embroiled in scandals after pardoning his brother from a ten-year prison sentence while serving as acting governor, and in his capacity to dissolve three insolvent banks in his home county.

Candidates in the Democratic primary were Lieutenant Governor Wilson, Lee Cazort, Paul Grabiel, Freed Hutto, Joe W. Kimysey, R.F. Milwee, and J. Rosser Venable.

=== Constitutional offices ===
==== Attorney general ====
Hal L. Norwood won reelection as Arkansas Attorney General. He was challenged in the Democratic primary by Hal C. Norwood, Boyd Cypert, John C. Sheffield, and J.G. Ragsdale.

==== Secretary of State ====
Ed F. McDonald won reelection as Arkansas Secretary of State unopposed.

==== Auditor ====
J. Oscar Humphrey won reelection as Arkansas State Auditor. He was challenged in the Democratic primary by Roy H. Hand and Charlie Parker.

==== Treasurer ====
Roy V. Leonard won reelection as Arkansas State Treasurer unopposed.

==== State Land Commissioner ====
A new Arkansas State Land Commissioner was elected in 1932. The incumbent, Belva Martin, elected not to pursue reelection. Three men sought the Democratic nomination: William L. DeCamp of Little Rock, George W. Neal of Murfreesboro, and Ed P. Rosser of Russellville.

George W. Neal ultimately won election.
