= Lee Seamster =

American judge and politician (1888–1960)

Chief Justice of the Arkansas Supreme Court
- In office May 1955 – December 31, 1956
- Preceded by: Griffin Smith
- Succeeded by: Carleton Harris

Chancery Judge of the 13th District
- In office August 30, 1949 – December 31, 1950
- Preceded by: John K. Butt
- Succeeded by: Thomas F. Butt

Member of the Arkansas House of Representatives from the Washington County district
- In office 1947–1948
- Preceded by: Paul C. Davis
- Succeeded by: Paul C. Davis

Chancery Judge of the 13th District
- In office February 20, 1925 – January 1, 1943
- Preceded by: Position created
- Succeeded by: John K. Butt

Mayor of Bentonville
- In office 1921 – November 1, 1922
- Succeeded by: Tom Curt

Member of the Arkansas House of Representatives from the Benton County district
- In office January 13, 1919 – 1920
- Preceded by: Jess McFarland
- Succeeded by: J.T. Clegg

Personal details
- Born: September 14, 1888 Beaty, Arkansas
- Died: July 25, 1960 (aged 71) Fayetteville, Arkansas
- Party: Democrat
- Spouse: Fannie Presley (m. 1908)
- Children: Bernal D. Seamster, Margaret Jane Seamster, Dorothy Louise Seamster
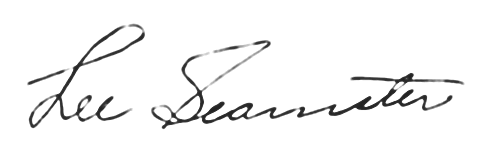
- Signature

Lee A. Seamster (born September 14, 1888 – July 25, 1960) was a lawyer and politician from Northwest Arkansas. Passing the bar in 1913, Seamster practiced law in Bentonville, and represented the area in the Arkansas House of Representatives from 1919 to 1920, and served as mayor of Bentonville from 1921 to 1922, until he resigned to move to Fayetteville to open a law practice. Over the next two decades, Seamster practiced law and served as Chancery Judge of the 13th District for eighteen years before representing the Fayetteville area in the Arkansas House from 1947 to 1948. He was appointed to serve as Chief Justice of the Supreme Court of Arkansas from 1955 to 1956 by Governor Orval Faubus.

== Early life ==
Lee Seamster was born to Martin Luther Seamster and Nancy Jane (née Cole) Seamster in Beaty, Arkansas on September 14, 1888. Both parents were from Missouri, from Barry County, Missouri and Schuyler County, Missouri, respectively. The family had nine children, eight of which survived to adulthood, with Lee being one of seven brothers. Lee attended public schools in Benton County. He earned his teaching license at age 17, and taught in a rural Benton County school for two years while saving money for further education. He married Fannie Presley of Benton County in 1908. At nineteen, he was appointed as a rural mail carrier, a position he held for six years. While holding the position, he read law under a local judge and mentor W. D. Mauck.

The family cared deeply about the Lost Cause. Lee and his brother, Alvin, were charter members of the Bentonville Ku Klux Klan when it formed in July 1922. Alvin was a noted collector of historic objects and artifacts, and the hobby may have extended to Lee as well. Lee Seamster and Clyde Ellis purchased the original Act passed on November 14, 1861, amending state laws to substitute "Confederate States" wherever the words "United States" occurred following secession from the union in 1942. Seamster's wife, Fannie Presley, was a member of the United Daughters of the Confederacy by virtue of her ancestry. Lee's brother Alvin was active in the Arkansas Historical Association, where he advocated an Arkansas history curriculum in schools.

== Early career ==
Seamster became a member of the Arkansas Bar Association on January 21, 1913, and opened a law practice in Bentonville from 1920 to 1923. Seamster also entered political life, serving as a justice of the peace in Benton County and as an alderman in Bentonville. In 1919, he was elected to represent Benton County in the Arkansas House of Representatives. He was elected mayor of Bentonville in 1921, but resigned the following November to move to Fayetteville and open a law practice with partner John W. Nance. He won election as Fayetteville city attorney in 1924, though did not remain in the position long.

Seamster also maintained a farm in Benton County, and was a member of several prominent social organizations, including the Independent Order of Odd Fellows, Freemasonry, and the Knights of Pythias, where he served as Chancellor Commander. He was active in the Democratic Party, described in 1930 as "enthusiastic and hardworking in behalf of his party". He served as a delegate to the state convention during the contentious 1924 democratic primary, which culminated in the 1924 Democratic National Convention, the longest continuously running convention in the United States political history.

== Chancery Judge ==
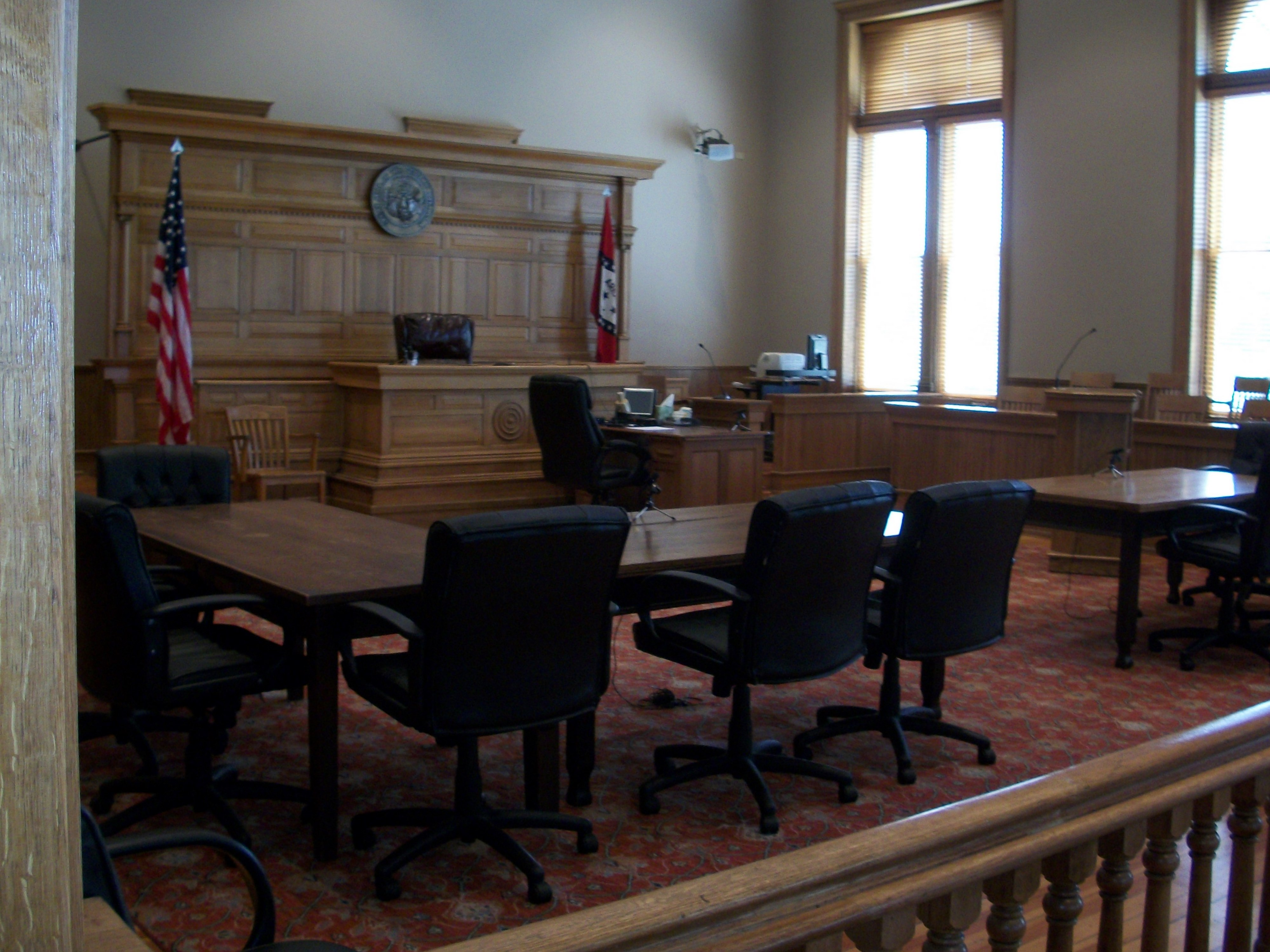
Courtroom in the Washington County Courthouse

Following reform of the Arkansas judiciary, Lee Seamster was appointed as chancery judge of the newly created 13th Chancery Court on February 20, 1925. The court's district included Washington Benton, Carroll and Madison Counties. He won a six-year term the following year in an unopposed election, and was also unopposed in 1930 and 1936. He would hold the position until voluntary retirement in 1943. During his tenure, Seamster adjudicated thousands of cases, including many involving financial institutions, highways, and business transactions between farmers and ranchers. The cases represented a microcosm of the larger issues plaguing the state at the time, which often saw banks run insolvent and did not have a highway fund.

Seamster's political profile quickly grew during his judgeship. He actively supported Governor Harvey Parnell in 1928 and 1930, and considered a run for governor himself in early 1932. Seamster was even mentioned as a "probable candidate" by local newspapers. Seamster elected against running, instead managing Dwight H. Blackwood's failed campaign for the Democratic gubernatorial nomination. Ultimately, Junius Marion Futrell of Northeast Arkansas, a longtime chancery judge and former state representative in his own right, won the Democratic nomination and 1932 election. Seamster became co-chairman of the Democratic Party of Arkansas, splitting the state's 75 counties equally with A.L. Hutchins of Forrest City and Grover Owens of Little Rock.

Following the death of Arkansas Supreme Court Associate Justice Turner Butler in 1938, rumors of Governor's Carl E. Bailey appointment to fill the position crossed the state. Political friends in the Democratic party were the heavy favorite, including Seamster, and even Bailey himself resigning as governor to take the position. The Washington County Bar Association and county officials sent a telegram to the governor recommending Seamster. Governor Bailey instead appointed William R. Donham to fill the remainder of the term.

Following retirement, Seamster entered private practice from the Eason Building at 100 West Center in Fayetteville on the Fayetteville Square. Seamster campaign manager in the Arkansas 3rd district for J. William Fulbright's successful 1944 Senate campaign, running the campaign's Fayetteville headquarters. In 1947, he was extremely well respected in the legal and political communities, described as "one of the most capable attorneys in the State of Arkansas" and "Mr. Seamster possesses a stateman's grasp of affairs and ever keeps pace with the best thinking men of the age". Seamster was a prolific jurist, hearing 16,001 cases, with only 141 of his cases being appealed, and only 33 of those being reversed upon appeal.

== Later career ==
=== Arkansas House of Representatives ===
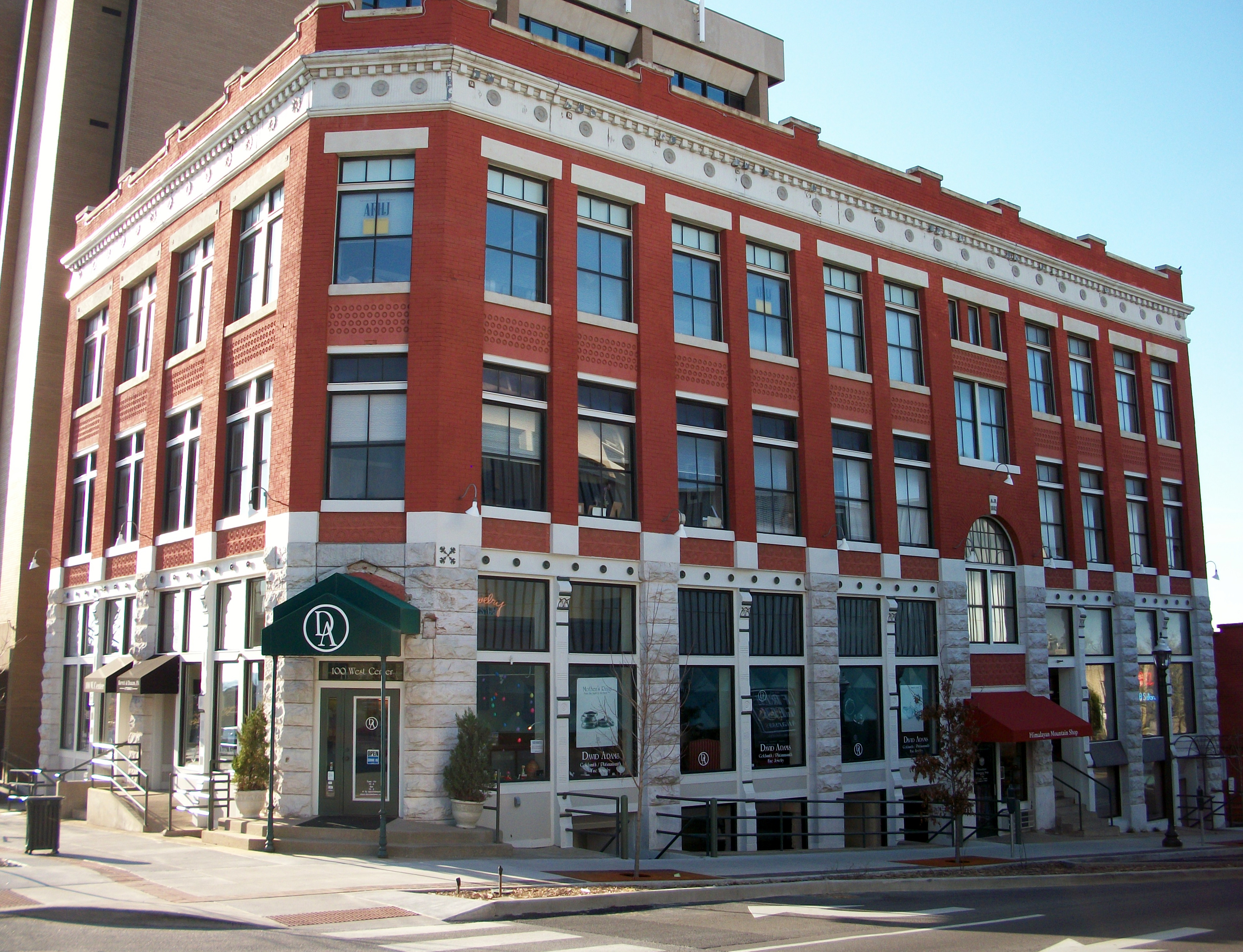
Seamster's office was located in this building at the northwest corner of the Fayetteville Square

Seamster ran to represent Washington County in the Arkansas House of Representatives in 1947. He challenged incumbent Paul C. Davis of Summers. Davis published an affidavit in The Northwest Arkansas Times detailing a conversation he had with Jim Gregory, a prominent Fayetteville resident, shortly after announcing his reelection campaign. Gregory said he was a member of a "committee" of six powerful men who had already "selected" two men for the two state representative positions, one of them being Lee Seamster. Davis offered to fund Davis' run for county treasurer or city clerk, and bribed and threatened Davis after he refused to withdraw. A campaign ad for Seamster described his focus on farmers, broilers, ranchers, dairy men, and educators. It also referenced his knowledge of highway laws.

On August 16, Seamster was announced as the winner of the Democratic primary, with 2,742 votes to 2,342 for Davis. A recount was requested by Davis, and the 130 vote margin was confirmed and certified. During the Solid South period, winning Democratic primaries was tantamount to election.

Seamster worked as a legislative advisor to Governor Sid McMath during the 1949 legislative session. Seamster was appointed to his former position as chancery judge by Governor Sid McMath on August 30, 1949, following news that John K. Butts was killed in a car accident. Seamster would remain in the position until December 31, 1950, and be ineligible to run for reelection in the 1950 election. He returned to work as a legislative advisor in 1951.

=== Supreme Court ===
He authored fifteen opinions during his time as chief justice.

After his time on the court, Seamster worked as a legislative advisor to Orval Faubus in 1957.

== Personal life ==
The Seamsters were married in Bentonville in 1908. They had three children: Bernal D. Seamster, Margaret Jane Seamster, Dorothy Louise Seamster. They lived at "Country Gardens", a home at 410 Holly Street in Fayetteville near the Wilson Park Historic District. The Seamsters hosted several events at Country Gardens, frequently covered by the society pages of the local newspapers.

Seamster is buried in Evergreen Cemetery in Fayetteville, with many other prominent Fayetteville residents, and alongside his wife, who died in 1978.

== See also ==
- List of mayors of Bentonville, Arkansas

Political offices
Preceded by Griffin Smith	Justice of the Arkansas Supreme Court; May 1955 – December 31, 1956	Succeeded by Carleton Harris
Preceded by Paul C. Davis	Arkansas House of Representatives; Washington County; 1947–1948	Succeeded by Paul C. Davis
Preceded by Position created John K. Butt	Chancery Judge; 13th District; February 20, 1925 – January 1, 1943; August 30, 1949 – December 31, 1950	Succeeded by John K. Butt; Thomas F. Butt
Preceded by Jess McFarland	Arkansas House of Representatives; Benton County; January 13, 1919–1920	Succeeded by J.T. Clegg
