= 1924 Arkansas gubernatorial election =

- November 4, 1924
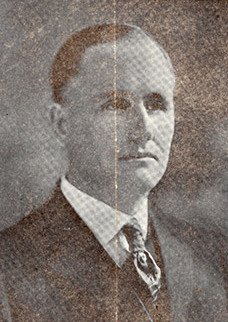

Nominee	Tom Terral	John W. Grabiel
Party	Democratic	Republican
Popular vote	99,598	25,152
Percentage	79.84%	20.16%
- County results Terral: 50–60% 60–70% 70–80% 80–90% >90% Grabiel: 50–60%
Governor before election
Thomas Chipman McRae
Democratic
Elected Governor
Tom Terral
Democratic

The 1924 Arkansas gubernatorial election was held on November 4, 1924, in order to elect the Governor of Arkansas. Democratic nominee and former Arkansas Secretary of State Tom Terral defeated Republican nominee John W. Grabiel.

== Democratic primary ==
The Democratic primary election was held on August 12, 1924. Former Arkansas Secretary of State Tom Terral received a majority of the votes (26.35%), and was thus elected as the nominee for the general election on November 4, 1924.

=== Results ===
1924 Democratic gubernatorial primary
Party	Candidate	Votes	%
Democratic	Tom Terral	54,553	26.35%
Democratic	Lee Cazort	43,466	21.00%
Democratic	John Ellis Martineau	35,438	17.12%
Democratic	Jim G. Ferguson	27,155	13.12%
Democratic	Hamp Williams	23,785	11.49%
Democratic	Jacob R. Wilson	22,626	10.93%
Total votes		207,023	100.00%

== General election ==
On election day, November 4, 1924, Democratic nominee Tom Terral won the election by a margin of 74,446 votes against his opponent Republican nominee John W. Grabiel, thereby retaining Democratic control over the office of Governor. Terral was sworn in as the 27th Governor of Arkansas on January 14, 1925.

=== Results ===
1924 Arkansas gubernatorial election
Party	Candidate	Votes	%
Democratic	Tom Terral	99,598	79.84
Republican	John W. Grabiel	25,152	20.16
Total votes		124,750	100.00
Democratic hold			
