= Lee Cazort =

American lawyer and politician

William Lee Cazort, Sr.
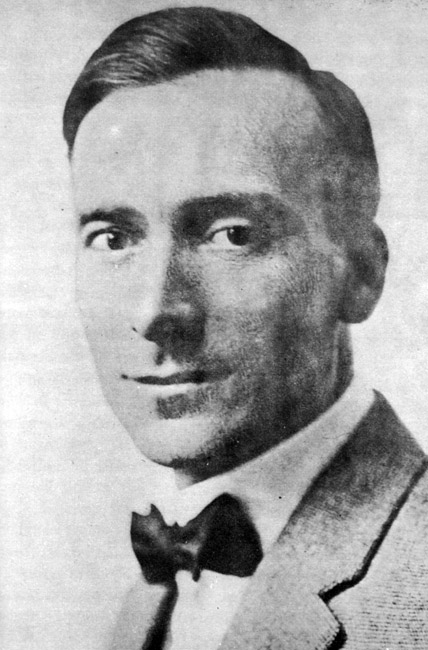
- Cazort c. 1917

5th and 7th Lieutenant Governor of Arkansas
- In office January 9, 1933 – January 11, 1937
- Governor: Junius Marion Futrell
- Preceded by: Lawrence Wilson
- Succeeded by: Robert B. Bailey
- In office January 14, 1929 – January 12, 1931
- Governor: Harvey Parnell
- Preceded by: Harvey Parnell
- Succeeded by: Lawrence Wilson

Member of the Arkansas Senate from the Fourth district
- In office January 13, 1919 – January 8, 1923
- Preceded by: J. M. Barker
- Succeeded by: Robert Bailey

41st Speaker of the Arkansas House of Representatives
- In office January 8, 1917 – January 13, 1919
- Preceded by: Lewis E. Sawyer
- Succeeded by: C. P. Newton

Member of the Arkansas House of Representatives from the Johnson County district
- In office January 11, 1915 – January 13, 1919
- Preceded by: Heartsill Ragon
- Succeeded by: E. T. McConnell

Personal details
- Born: December 3, 1887 Lamar, Arkansas, USA
- Died: October 6, 1969 (aged 81) Little Rock, Arkansas
- Resting place: Oakland Cemetery in Little Rock
- Party: Democratic
- Spouse: Rachel Cora Cline Cazort (married 1916)
- Children: Four children, all deceased: William L. Cazort, Jr. (died 1999); Bettie Belle Cazort Vaughan Emery Stover (1918–2011); Rachel Cornelia Cazort Phillips Hilton (1926-2007) Ronald Cazort
- Education: Hendrix College University of Arkansas Washington and Lee University School of Law
- Profession: Lawyer; Businessman

William Lee Cazort, Sr. (December 3, 1887 – October 6, 1969) was a lawyer and Democratic politician from Johnson County in the Arkansas River Valley. Winning a seat in the Arkansas House of Representatives in 1915, Cazort became a rising star in Arkansas politics for the next eight years. He was defeated in the 1924 Democratic gubernatorial primary, but served as the fifth and seventh lieutenant governor of Arkansas from 1929 to 1931 under Governor Harvey Parnell and from 1933 to 1937 under Governor Junius Marion Futrell. Cazort also sought the Democratic gubernatorial nomination in 1930 and 1936, but failed to gain necessary statewide support and withdrew before the primary both times.

== Early life ==
One of eight children, Cazort was born in Johnson County near Cabin Creek, now Lamar, the son of James Robert Cazort and the former Belle Garner. His father held interests in land, lumber, cotton, livestock, and mercantile trade. The family-owned Cazort Brothers operated throughout Arkansas and into neighboring states. Cazort attended the public school in Lamar but graduated from high school in Fort Smith, the seat of Sebastian County and traditionally the second-largest city in the state. From 1903 to 1904, Cazort attended Hendrix College in Conway, Arkansas. In 1907, he enrolled at the University of Arkansas at Fayetteville. In 1910, he received his legal degree from Washington and Lee University School of Law in Lexington, Virginia. He practiced law in Fort Smith and maintained orchards on Big Danger Mountain in Johnson County.

== Early career and Arkansas General Assembly ==
In 1916, Cazort married the former Rachel Cline of Newton County. Cazort began taking over parts of the family enterprise, which had become well-known regionally. He managed an alfalfa farm and peach orchard in the River Valley, while also producing lumber and railroad ties. Over time, his reputation grew favorably both in Johnson County and statewide.

In 1914, Cazort officially entered politics by running for the Johnson County seat in the Arkansas House of Representatives. With the exception of privately practicing law from 1922 to 1924, Cazort sought or held political office over the next 23 years. Cazort won the election for the seat previously filled by Heartsill Ragon, who became a powerful United States Congressman. He took the oath of office in January 1915 for the 40th General Assembly. After winning reelection in November 1916, Cazort was elected as the 42nd Speaker of the Arkansas House by his House colleagues for the 41st General Assembly. At twenty-nine, he was in 1917 the youngest ever Arkansas House Speaker. While in the House, he introduced what became the Tick Eradication Act and sponsored legislation which provide taxpayer-funded textbooks for the first eight grades in Arkansas public schools.

Cazort won election to the Arkansas Senate in November 1918, representing the Fourth District (Johnson and Pope counties), a largely agricultural district which also included the growing cities of Clarksville and Russellville. He won reelection in November 1920, and was elected President of the Arkansas Senate for the 43rd General Assembly. At age thirty-three in 1921, he was the youngest ever President of the Arkansas Senate. After his service as state senator ended in 1922, Cazort returned to his law practice in Little Rock. Much of his early practice centered on representing veterans of World War I with insurance claims.

== Statewide politics ==
Beginning in 1924, Lee Cazort sought or held statewide office throughout the next 13 years. In 1928, he was described as having good statewide name recognition following a successful tenure in the General Assembly, combined with the name recognition of his family's wide-ranging business dealings.

=== 1924 gubernatorial bid ===
In 1924, Cazort sought the governorship among a crowded Democratic field. Cazort won the Ku Klux Klan 'gubernatorial primary' over James Ferguson, another candidate seeking the Democratic nomination. Cazort was active in the Klan, and openly endorsed the Klan's platform during the primary. Tom Terral, ultimately won the 1924 Democratic primary.

=== Lieutenant governor ===
Cazort served on the Penitentiary Commission from 1927 to 1928, seeking the Democratic nomination for Lieutenant Governor in 1928. The lieutenant governor position offered power; recently having been reestablished in 1926 after remaining vacant for twelve years while the position's legitimacy was disputed. The lieutenant governor assumed the full duties of the governor when he was out of state, incapacitated, or resigned. Recent events had further increased the profile of the nascent lieutenant governorship. Harvey Parnell, who won the first lieutenant governorship since 1914, ascended to the governorship in March 1928 following John Ellis Martineau's resignation and was now seeking the 1930 Democratic gubernatorial nomination. A campaign advertisement from a Benton County newspaper mentioned the succession of Parnell while making the case for Cazort.

Cazort emerged victorious from a four-candidate field for the Democratic nomination, which was tantamount to election during the Solid South period. He bested Dr. A.C. Millar of Little Rock, Thornberry A. Gray of Batesville, and Tom A. Hill of Pine Bluff in the Democratic primary.

=== Lieutenant governor and 1930 gubernatorial bid ===
In 1930, as the sitting lieutenant governor, and with the KKK no longer an issue, Cazort challenged Governor Parnell. He questioned Parnell's spending and cronyism in the state highway department. Prior to the primary, Cazort withdrew to support Brooks Hays, later a U.S. Representative from Little Rock. Parnell was also Cazort's predecessor as lieutenant governor. Cazort was again elected lieutenant governor in 1932 and 1934, when he drew no opposition.

=== 1936 gubernatorial bid ===
In 1936, Cazort once more ran for governor but again withdrew from the race when Carl Edward Bailey gained the advantage.

After he left the lieutenant governorship for the final time, he was from 1937 to 1962 a bankruptcy referee for the United States District Court for the Eastern District of Arkansas. Cazort died in a Little Rock hospital in 1969 and is interred there at Oakland Cemetery.

== Personal ==
The couple had four children, all now deceased: William L. Cazort, Jr. (died 1999), Bettie Belle Cazort Vaughan Emery Stover (1918–2011), Rachel Cornelia Cazort Phillips Hilton (1926-2007), and Ronald Cazort. A former resident of Wynne and a one-time employee of the Arkansas Legislative Council, Bettie Stover was the Cross County chairman of the Winthrop Rockefeller gubernatorial campaigns.

Political offices
Preceded by Lawrence Wilson	Lieutenant Governor of Arkansas; January 9, 1933 – January 11, 1937	Succeeded by Robert L. Bailey
Preceded by Harvey Parnell	Lieutenant Governor of Arkansas; January 14, 1929 – January 12, 1931	Succeeded by Lawrence Wilson
Preceded by Harry L. Ponder	President of the Arkansas State Senate; 1921 – 1922	Succeeded by Jacob R. Wilson
Preceded by J. M. Barker	Arkansas Senate; Fourth District; January 13, 1919 – January 8, 1923	Succeeded by Robert Bailey
Preceded by L. E. Sawyer	Speaker of the Arkansas House of Representatives; January 8, 1917 – January 13, 1919	Succeeded by C. P. Newton
Preceded by Heartsill Ragon	Arkansas House of Representatives; Johnson County District; January 11, 1915 – January 13, 1919	Succeeded by E. T. McConnell
