= 1928 Arkansas gubernatorial election =

- November 6, 1928
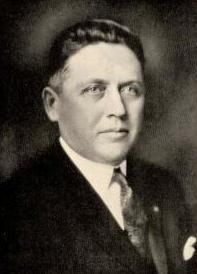

Nominee	Harvey Parnell	Drew Bowers
Party	Democratic	Republican
Popular vote	151,743	44,545
Percentage	77.31%	22.69%
- County results Parnell: 50–60% 60–70% 70–80% 80–90% >90% Bowers: 50–60%
Governor before election
Harvey Parnell
Democratic
Elected Governor
Harvey Parnell
Democratic

The 1928 Arkansas gubernatorial election was held on November 6, 1928, in order to elect the Governor of Arkansas. Democratic nominee and incumbent Governor Harvey Parnell defeated Republican nominee Drew Bowers.

== Democratic primary ==
The Democratic primary election was held on August 14, 1928. Incumbent Governor Harvey Parnell received a majority of the votes (41.65%), and was thus elected as the nominee for the general election on November 6, 1928.

=== Results ===
1928 Democratic gubernatorial primary
Party	Candidate	Votes	%
Democratic	Harvey Parnell (incumbent)	94,207	41.65%
Democratic	Brooks Hays	57,497	25.42%
Democratic	Tom Terral	34,476	15.24%
Democratic	J. Carrol Cone	31,786	14.05%
Democratic	R. K. Mason	3,398	1.50%
Democratic	Ben L. Griffin	2,617	1.16%
Democratic	J. Rosser Venable	2,205	0.98%
Total votes		226,186	100.00%

== General election ==
On election day, November 6, 1928, Democratic nominee Harvey Parnell won the election by a margin of 107,198 votes against his opponent Republican nominee Drew Bowers, thereby retaining Democratic control over the office of Governor. Parnell was sworn in for his first full term as Governor of Arkansas on January 15, 1929.

=== Results ===
1928 Arkansas gubernatorial election
Party	Candidate	Votes	%
Democratic	Harvey Parnell (incumbent)	151,743	77.31
Republican	Drew Bowers	44,545	22.69
Total votes		196,288	100.00
Democratic hold			
