= Courts of Arkansas =

List of courts of Arkansas

Courts of Arkansas include:

State courts of Arkansas

- Arkansas Supreme Court
  - Arkansas Court of Appeals
    - Arkansas Circuit Courts (28 judicial circuits)
      - Arkansas District Courts
        - Arkansas State District Courts (32 state judicial districts)
        - Arkansas Local District Courts (35 local district courts)
      - Arkansas County Courts (75 counties)

Federal courts located in Arkansas

- United States District Court for the Eastern District of Arkansas
- United States District Court for the Western District of Arkansas
- United States Bankruptcy Court for the Eastern and Western Districts of Arkansas

Former federal courts of Arkansas

- United States District Court for the District of Arkansas (extinct, subdivided)

== See also ==
- Judiciary of Arkansas
