= James A. Rice House =

Historic house in Arkansas, United States

- U.S. National Register of Historic Places
- U.S. Historic district – Contributing property
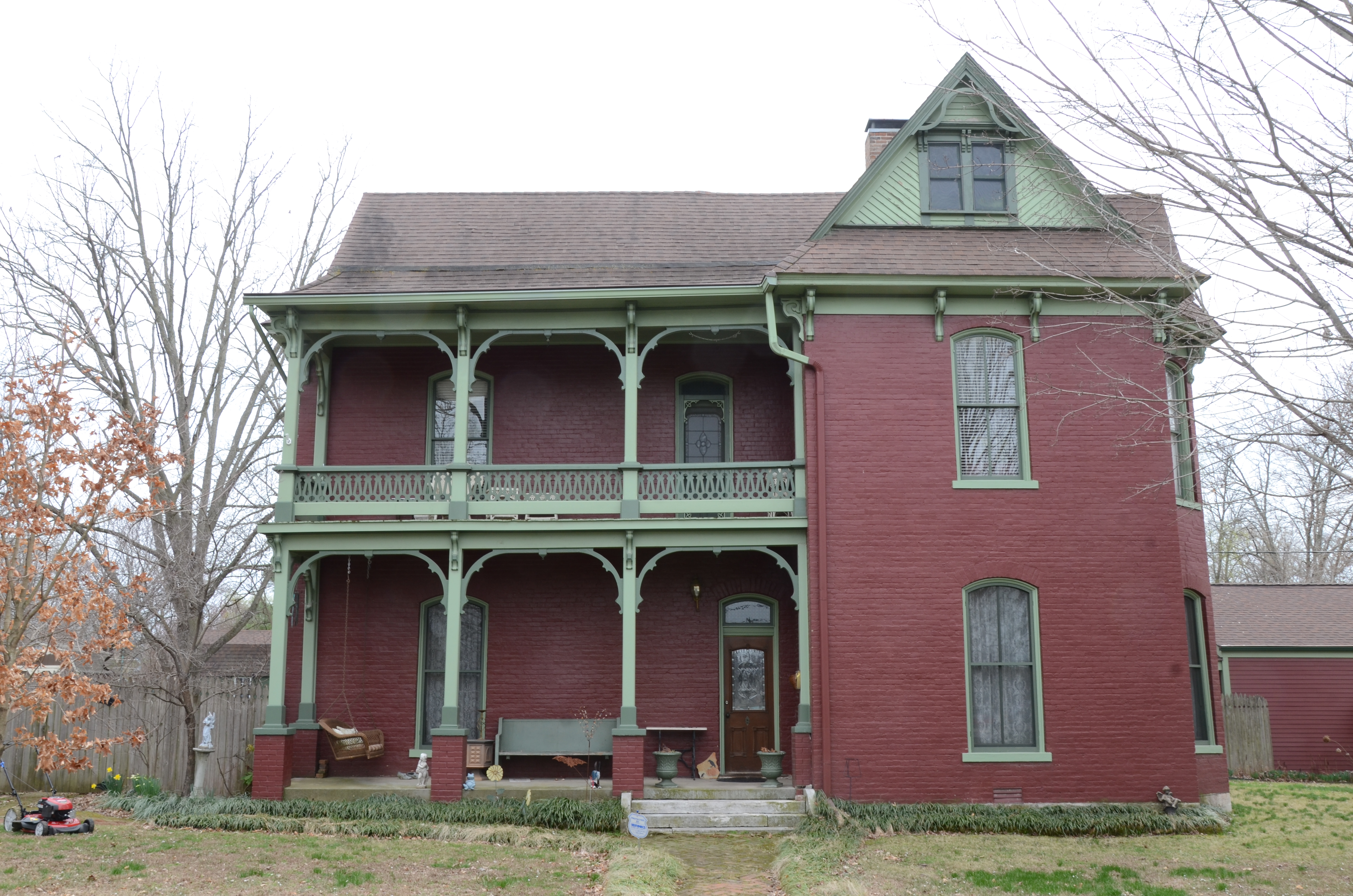

- Location within Arkansas Location within the United States
- Location: 204 SE 3rd St., Bentonville, Arkansas
- Coordinates: 36°22′9″N 94°12′28″W
- Area: less than one acre
- Built: 1879
- Architectural style: Italianate
- Part of: Bentonville Third Street Historic District (ID93001202)
- NRHP reference No.: 84000177

Significant dates
- Added to NRHP: November 1, 1984
- Designated CP: November 12, 1993

The James A. Rice House is a historic house at 204 Southeast Third Street in Bentonville, Arkansas. It is a 2 1/2-story brick structure, with tall arched windows and a bracketed cornice typical of the Italianate style. It has a two-story porch, asymmetrical massing, and a steeply pitched roof with cut-shingle gable finish typical of the Queen Anne style, which was in fashion when it was built c. 1879. Its builder and first owner was James A. Rice, a local lawyer who served two terms as mayor of Bentonville.

The house was listed on the National Register of Historic Places in 1984.

== See also ==
- National Register of Historic Places listings in Benton County, Arkansas
