= Cecil E. Johnson =

American judge (1888–1955)

Cecil E. Johnson (July 26, 1888 – April 19, 1955) was chief justice of the Arkansas Supreme Court from 1933 to 1936.

Born in Lockesburg, Arkansas, Johnson gained admission to the bar in 1909 and entered the private practice of law. In 1922, he was elected Chancellor of the Sixth Chancery District of Arkansas. Johnson was active in the Democratic Party, and was a key political advisor to Arkansas Governor Junius Marion Futrell, so much so that the state bar association "was distressed by Governor Futrell's appointment of C. E. Johnson as chief justice". Johnson was appointed to the seat vacated by the death of Chief Justice Jesse C. Hart, and was re-elected to the seat in 1934. His bid for reelection in 1936 failed, and he was defeated by Griffin Smith, who succeeded Johnson in office in 1937. Johnson thereafter returned to private practice.

Johnson died at his home in Ashdown, Arkansas, at the age of 66. A number of reports noted that Johnson died a week before his successor in office, Griffin Smith.

Political offices
Preceded by Jesse C. Hart	Justice of the Arkansas Supreme Court; 1933–1936	Succeeded by Griffin Smith
