= 1926 Arkansas gubernatorial election =

- October 5, 1926
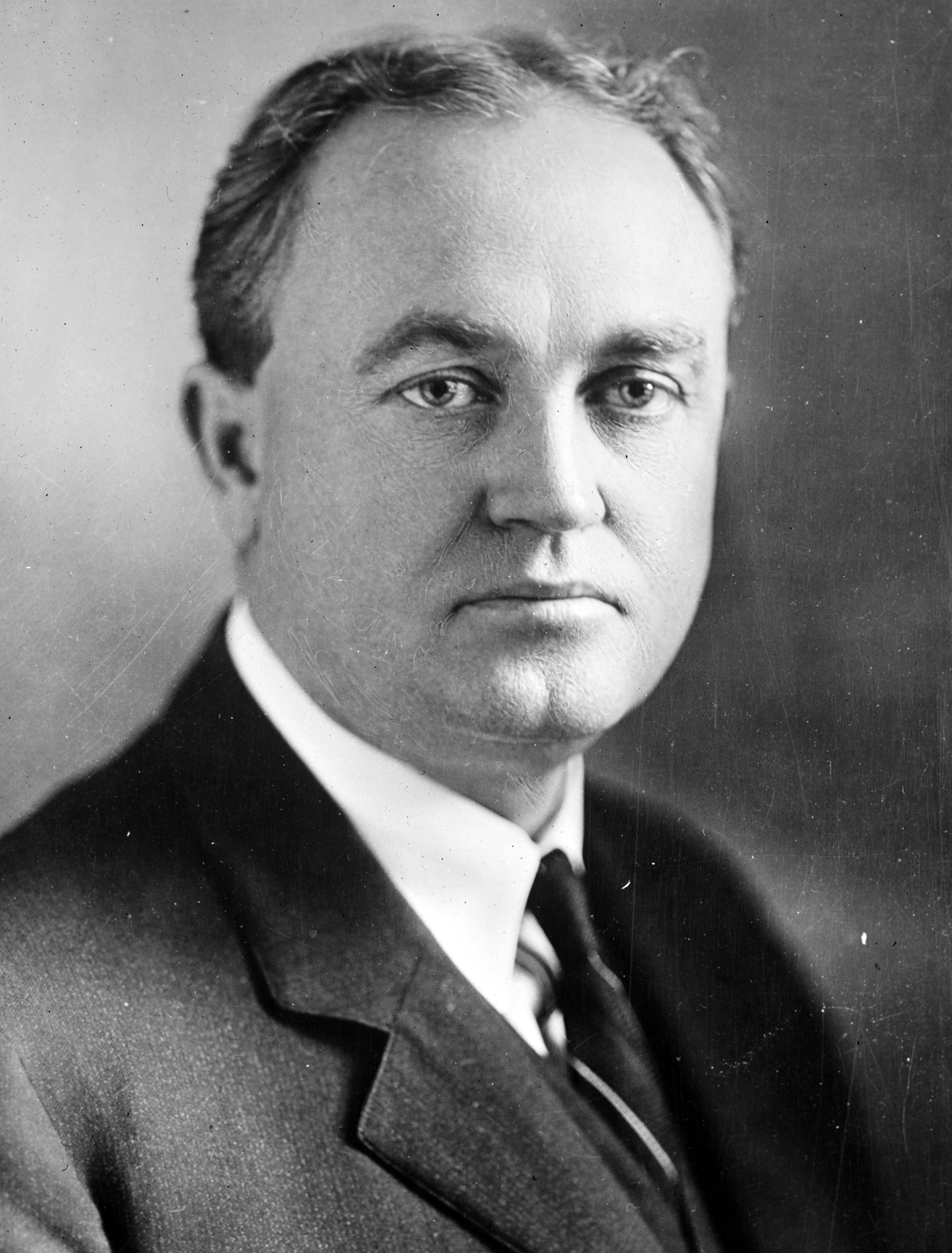

Nominee	John Ellis Martineau	Drew Bowers
Party	Democratic	Republican
Popular vote	116,735	35,969
Percentage	76.45%	23.55%
- County results Martineau: 50–60% 60–70% 70–80% 80–90% >90% Bowers: 50–60%
Governor before election
Tom Terral
Democratic
Elected Governor
John Ellis Martineau
Democratic

The 1926 Arkansas gubernatorial election was held on October 5, 1926.

Incumbent Democratic Governor Tom Terral was defeated in the Democratic primary.

Democratic nominee John Ellis Martineau defeated Republican nominee Drew Bowers with 76.45% of the vote.

== Democratic primary ==
The Democratic primary election was held on August 10, 1926.

=== Candidates ===
- John Ellis Martineau, Chancellor of the Arkansas Chancery Court for the First Chancery District
- Tom Terral, incumbent Governor

=== Results ===
Democratic primary results
Party	Candidate	Votes	%
Democratic	John Ellis Martineau	117,232	53.48
Democratic	Tom Terral (incumbent)	101,981	46.52
Total votes		219,213	100.00

== General election ==
=== Candidates ===
- John Ellis Martineau, Democratic
- Drew Bowers, Republican, Assistant United States Attorney, Republican nominee for Arkansas's 2nd congressional district in 1924

=== Results ===
1926 Arkansas gubernatorial election (Note: Dubin and Martin gives Bowers' vote as 35,879.)
Party	Candidate	Votes	%	±%
Democratic	John Ellis Martineau	116,735	76.45%	
Republican	Drew Bowers	35,969	23.55%	
Majority		80,766	52.90%	
Turnout		152,704		
Democratic hold		Swing		

== Bibliography ==
- Gubernatorial Elections, 1787–1997. Washington, D.C.: Congressional Quarterly Inc. 1998. ISBN 1-56802-396-0.
- Martin, Mark (2018). Historical Report of the Secretary of State (PDF). Little Rock, Arkansas: Arkansas Secretary of State's Office. ISBN 978-0-692-03553-5.
