= Elliott House (Bentonville, Arkansas) =

Historic house in Arkansas, United States

- U.S. National Register of Historic Places
- U.S. Historic district – Contributing property
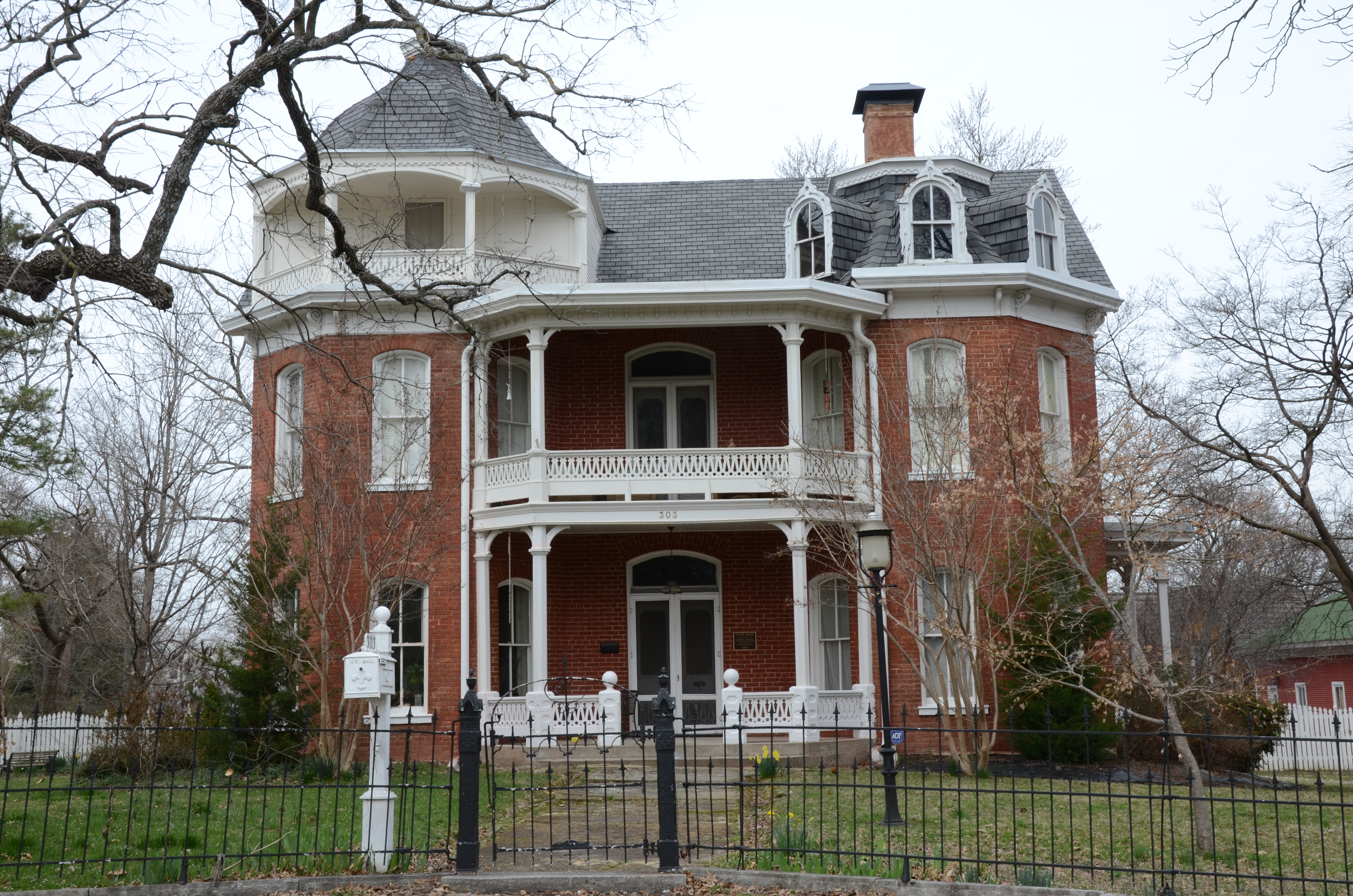

- Location within Arkansas Location within the United States
- Location: 303 SE 3rd St., Bentonville, Arkansas
- Coordinates: 36°22′11″N 94°12′17″W
- Area: less than one acre
- Built: 1887
- Architectural style: Italianate
- Part of: Bentonville Third Street Historic District (ID93001202)
- NRHP reference No.: 78000573

Significant dates
- Added to NRHP: January 20, 1978
- Designated CP: November 12, 1993

The Elliott House is a historic house at 303 South Third Street in Bentonville, Arkansas. It is a large three-story brick house with Italianate style, built in 1887 for Harry Elliott, who made a fortune investing in silver mines in Silver City, New Mexico. The house is distinctive for its use of brick on the interior as well as exterior walls; those on the inside are 8 inches (20 cm) thick, those outside are 16 inches (41 cm). The exterior features include seven porches, a widow's walk, and carved brackets in deeply overhanging eaves.

The house was listed on the National Register of Historic Places in 1978.

== See also ==
- National Register of Historic Places listings in Benton County, Arkansas
