= Bentonville Third Street Historic District =

Historic district in Arkansas, United States

- U.S. National Register of Historic Places
- U.S. Historic district
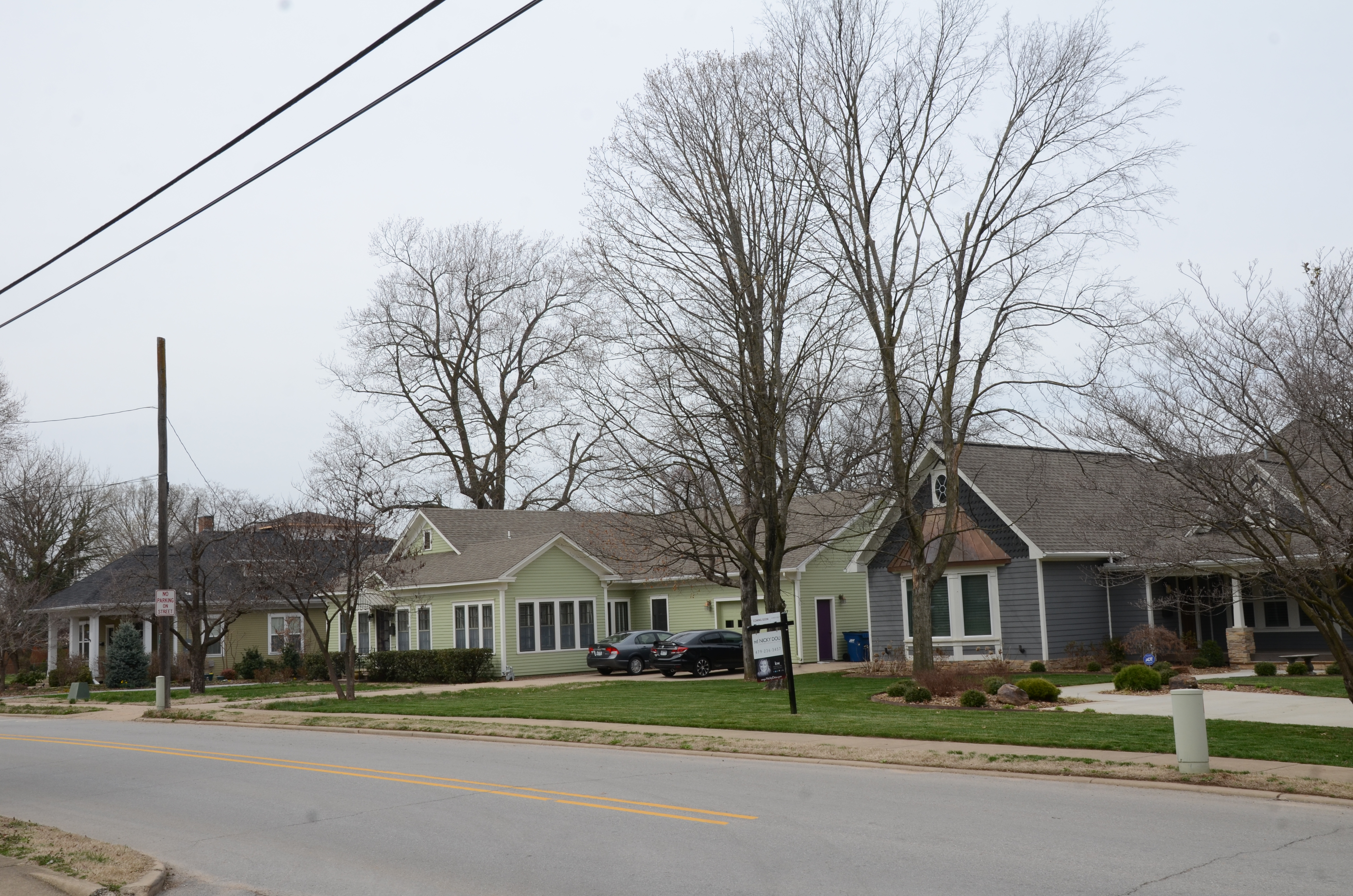
- Houses in the district

- Location within Arkansas Location within the United States
- Location: Roughly, 3rd St. SE. from Main St. to C St. SE., Bentonville, Arkansas
- Coordinates: 36°22′10″N 94°12′25″W
- Area: 10 acres (4.0 ha)
- Architectural style: Bungalow/craftsman, Colonial Revival, Italianate
- MPS: Benton County MRA
- NRHP reference No.: 93001202
- Added to NRHP: November 12, 1993

The Bentonville Third Street Historic District is a residential historic district just southeast of the central business district of Bentonville, Arkansas. It covers two blocks of SE Third Street, between Main and B Streets, including fourteen properties on Third Street and adjacent cross streets. This area, developed principally after the arrival in Bentonville of the railroad in 1881, is reflective of the high-style architecture of the late 19th and early 20th centuries that had not previously been widespread in Benton County. All of the houses are one to 2 1/2 stories in height, and all are wood frame, except the Elliott House, a brick house with an eclectic combination of Italianate and Second Empire styles.

The district was listed on the National Register of Historic Places in 1993.

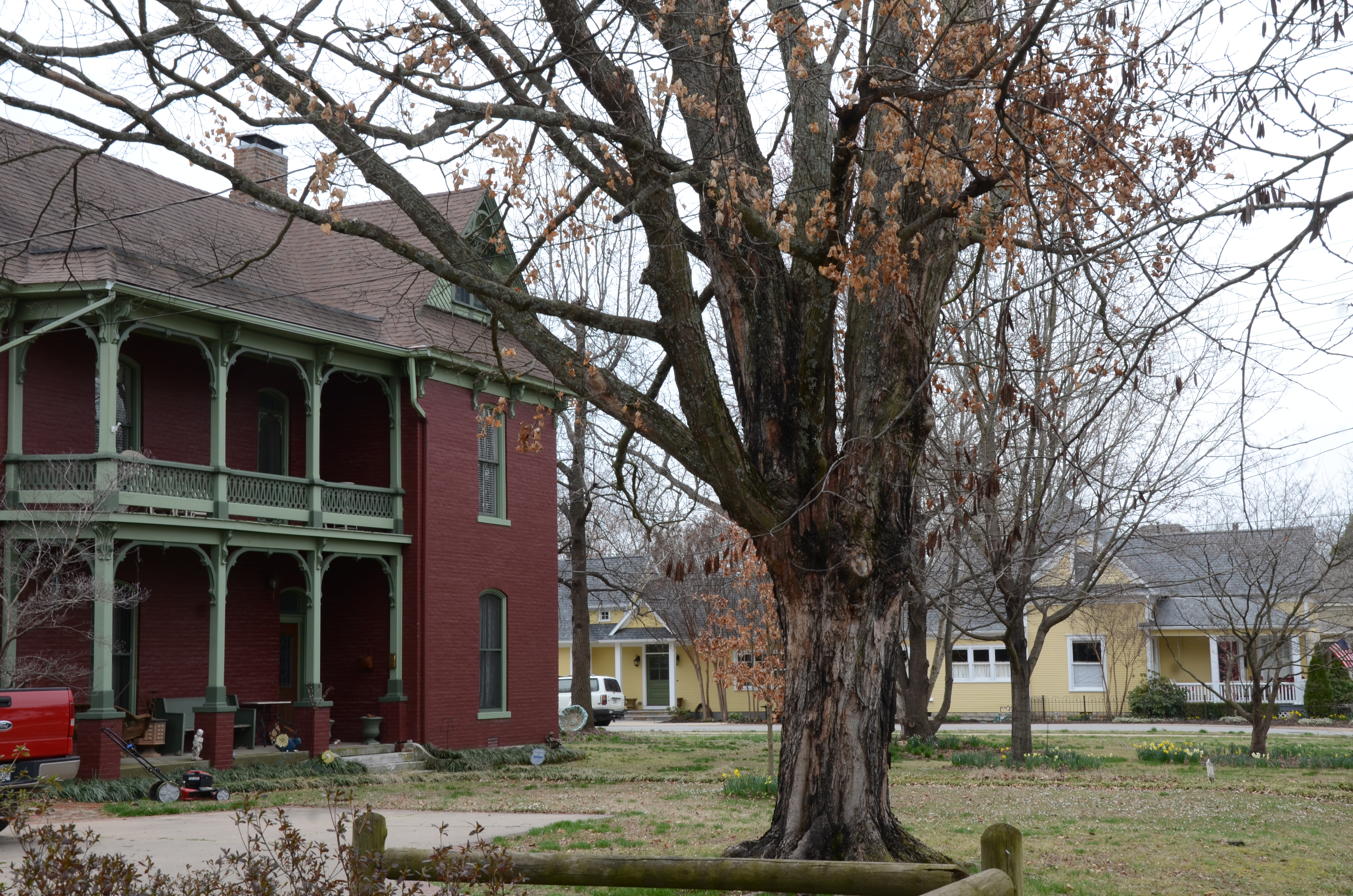
James A. Rice House, 2015

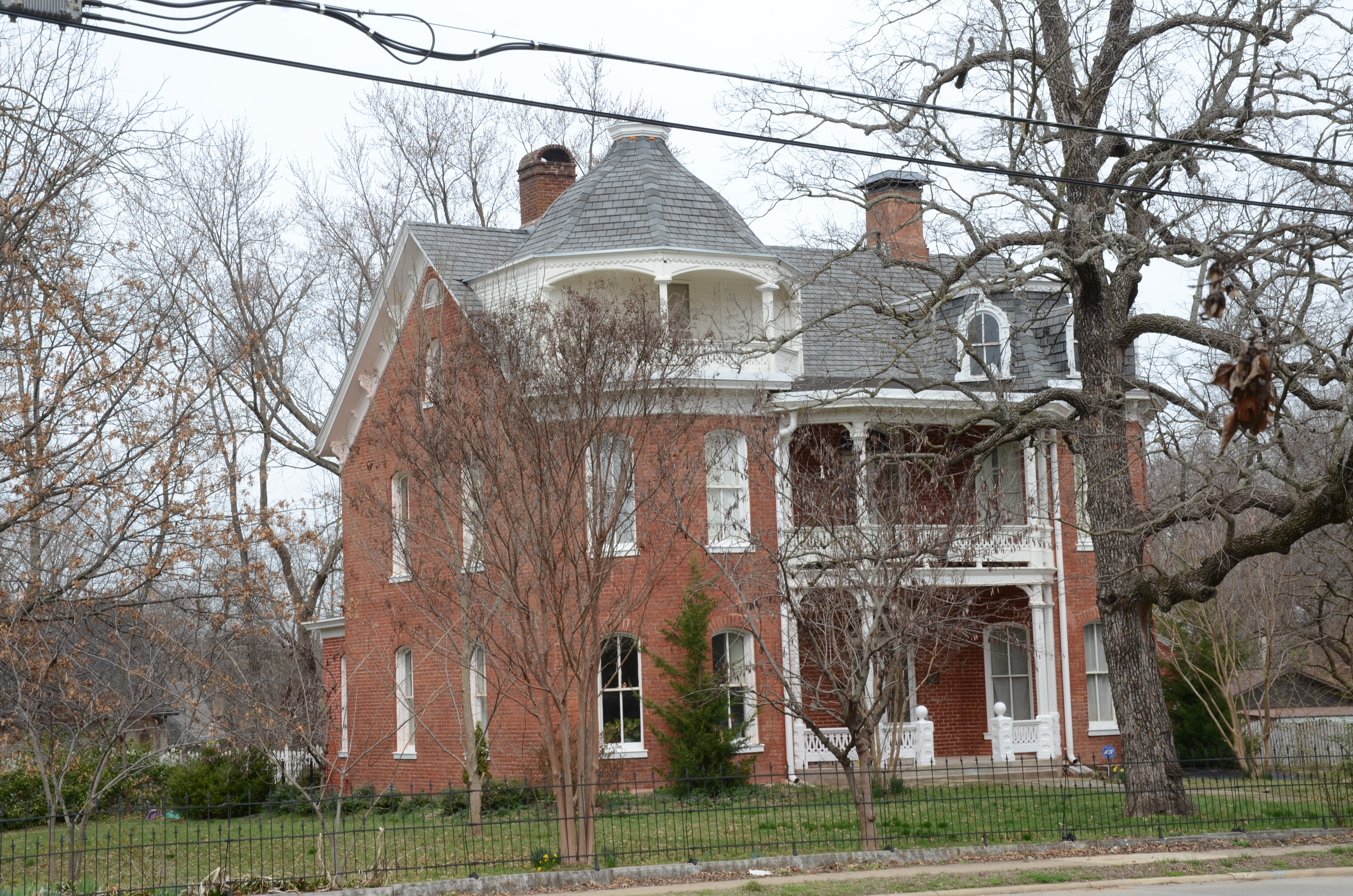
Elliott House, 2015

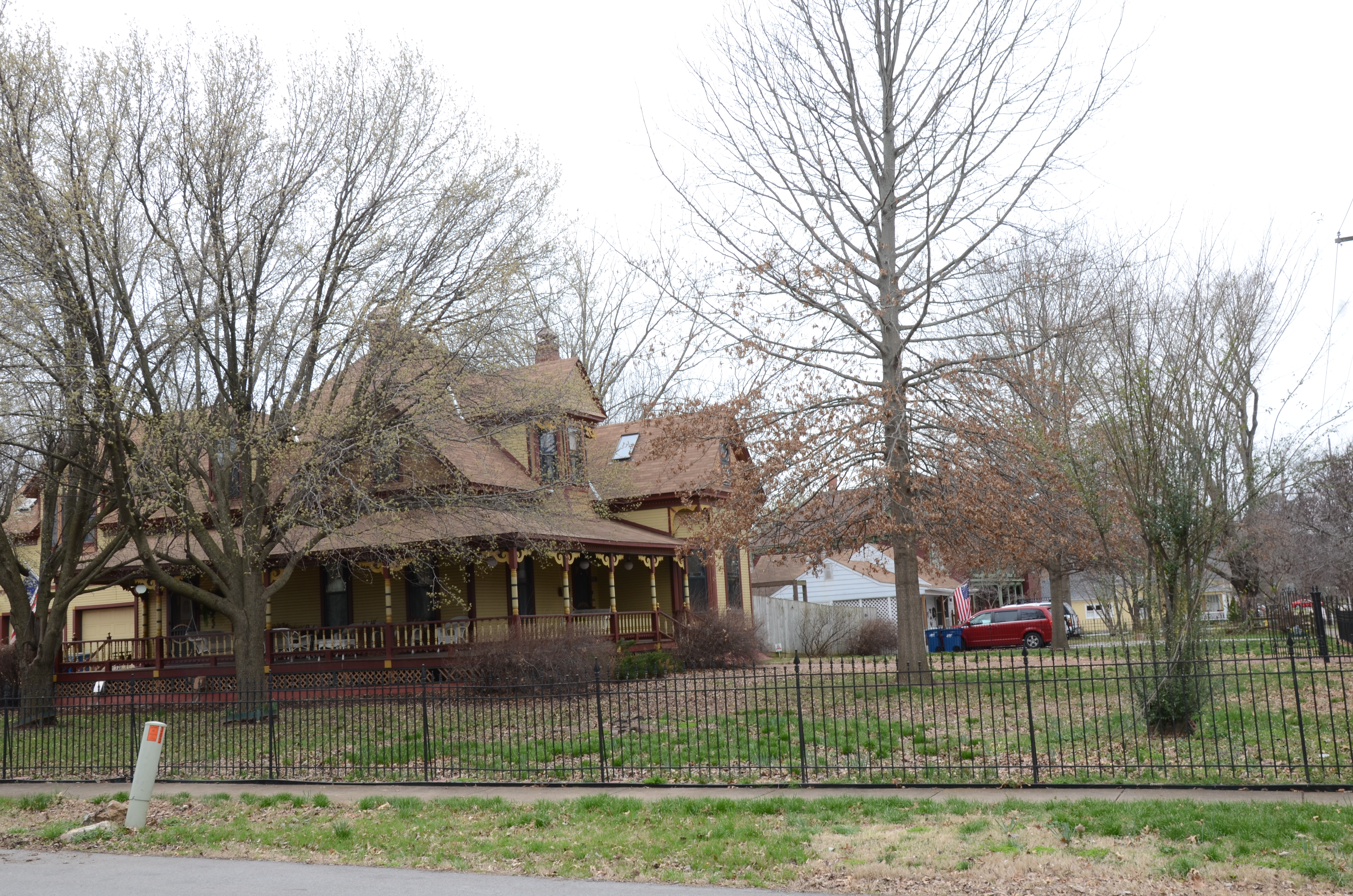
Houses located in Bentonville Third Street Historic District, 2015

== See also ==
- National Register of Historic Places listings in Benton County, Arkansas
