= Griffin Smith =

American judge (1885–1955)

Griffin Smith (July 13, 1885 – April 29, 1955) was chief justice of the Arkansas Supreme Court from 1937 until his death in 1955.

== Early life, education, and career ==
Born in the small town of Laurel Hill in Smith County, Tennessee, Smith attended a public school for one year, but was primarily taught at home by his parents, who were well-educated. Smith began working in his teens, and while employed at the Tennessee state textbook depository in Cookeville at the age of 17, contracted tuberculosis, which required two years to recover. Smith moved to Arkansas in 1911. Smith entered the newspaper business, becoming "editor, part owner, and eventually full owner of the Paragould Daily Press and weekly Paragould Soliphone". During World War I, Smith "reported from France to those papers, the Arkansas Gazette, the Memphis Commercial Appeal, and the United Press". Smith remained in the newspaper business for ten years before he "decided to pursue a career in law".

Smith received his law degree from Cumberland University. He then "opened a law practice in Marianna, Arkansas, in 1926".

== Political and legal career ==
In 1932, Smith "handled the publicity" for the successful gubernatorial campaign of Junius Marion Futrell, after which Governor Futrell appointed Smith Comptroller of Arkansas.

In 1935, Smith was one of four men, including three government officials, involved in an altercation that broke out following a week of "squabbling over audit matters". Smith and his chief deputy accountant J. Bryan Sims both suffered injuries requiring medical attention, and resulting in assault and battery charges being brought against all four men involved. In September 1936, Governor Futrell fired Smith, who refused to voluntarily resign from the office. Futrell stated at the time that the firing was motivated in part by his sense that "some people seemed to think the state would topple into ruin except for Griffin Smith". These events did not dim Griffin's political career, as he was elected Chief Justice of the state supreme court later in 1936, remaining in that office until his death.

As a justice, Smith "was a strict constructionist and believed laws were passed to be enforced without fear of favor, hewing to the line and letting the chips fall where they would".

== Personal life and death ==
Smith died of a heart attack at the age of 69, collapsing while speaking at the First Christian Church of El Dorado, Arkansas, and dying at Warner Brown Hospital hours later. A number of reports noted that Smith died the week after the death of his predecessor in office, Cecil E. Johnson.

Political offices
Preceded by Cecil E. Johnson	Justice of the Arkansas Supreme Court; 1937–1955	Succeeded by Lee Seamster
