= 1926 United States elections =

- ← 1924 1925 1926 1927 1928 → Midterm elections
- Election day: November 2
- Incumbent president: ▌Calvin Coolidge (R)
- Next Congress: 70th

Senate elections
- Overall control: Republican hold
- Seats contested: 35 of 96 seats (32 Class 3 seats + 6 special elections)
- Net seat change: Democratic +7
- 1926 Senate election results Democratic gain Democratic hold Republican gain Republican hold

House elections
- Overall control: Republican hold
- Seats contested: All 435 voting seats
- Net seat change: Democratic +11
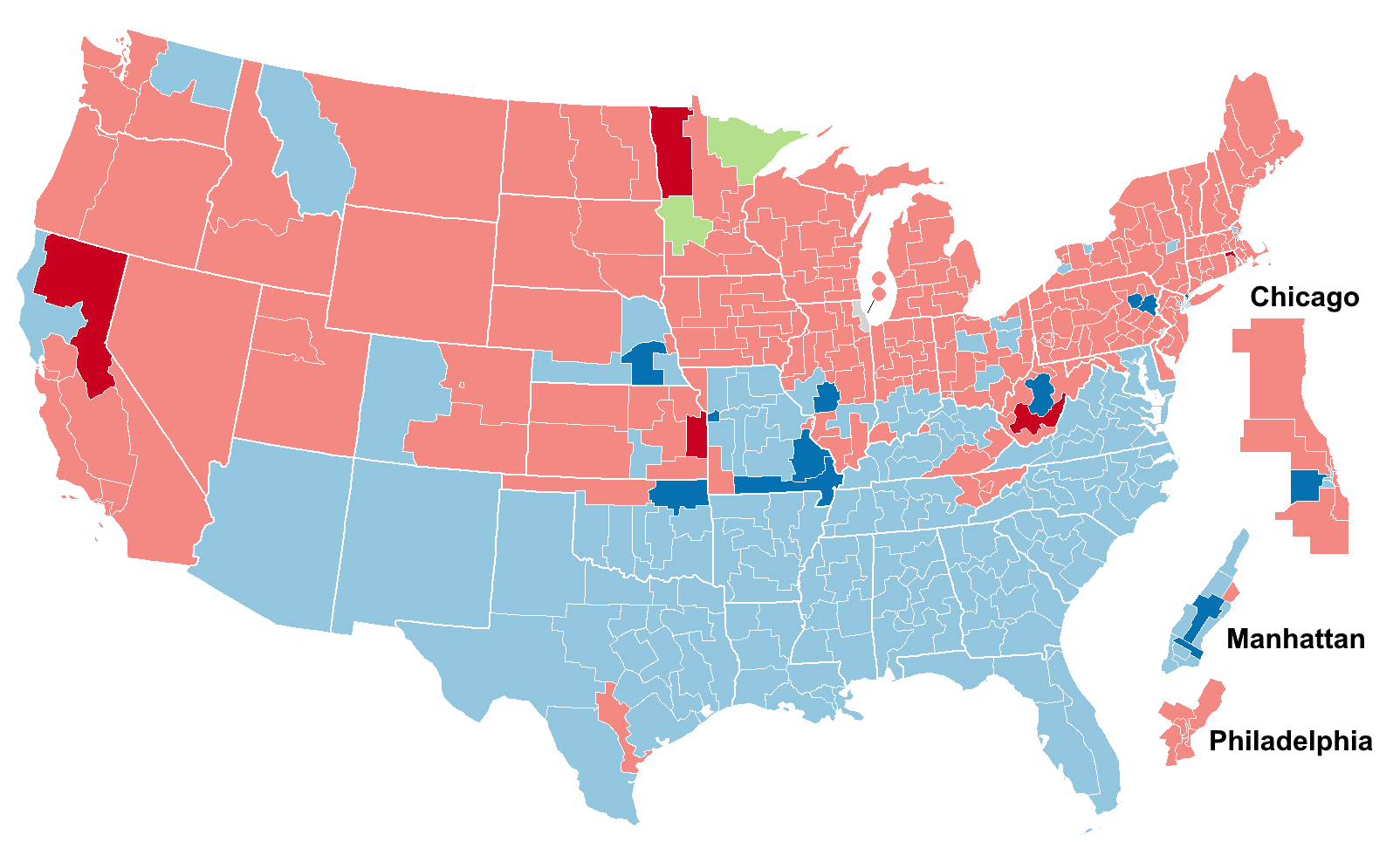
- 1926 House of Representatives election results

Gubernatorial elections
- Seats contested: 33
- Net seat change: Republican +2
- 1926 gubernatorial election results Democratic gain Democratic hold Republican gain Republican hold

Elections were held on November 2, 1926, in the middle of President Calvin Coolidge's second (only full) term. The Republican Party lost nine seats to the Democratic Party in the House of Representatives but retained their majority. The Republicans also lost six seats to the Democrats in the U.S. Senate but retained their majority. The Democratic gains in Congress were very modest for a midterm election, and since that time, the Republicans did not perform this well in midterm elections under a Republican president until 2002.

== See also ==
- 1926 United States House of Representatives elections
- 1926 United States Senate elections
- 1926 United States gubernatorial elections
