= Carleton Harris =

American judge (1909–1980)

Frank Carleton Harris (December 31, 1909 – December 21, 1980) was a justice of the Arkansas Supreme Court from 1957 to 1980.

Born in Pine Bluff, Jefferson County, Arkansas, Harris received his law degree from Cumberland University. He served three terms in the Arkansas House of Representatives, from 1932 to 1938, and served as a prosecuting attorney for several Arkansas counties.

As a chancellor, Harris implemented a requirement that divorcing couples wait thirty days before moving forward with their permission, which reportedly reduced the number going through with the divorce, and which was later adopted as state law.

Harris announced his consideration of a candidacy for Chief Justice of Arkansas in April 1956. He won the Democratic primary in August 1956, effectively insuring his election to the seat, which he assumed the following January. He remained on the court until 1980, when he was diagnosed with cancer and retired to undergo surgery. Harris died later that year, at the age of 71.

Political offices
Preceded by Lee Seamster	Justice of the Arkansas Supreme Court; 1957–1980	Succeeded by John A. Fogleman
