= Lawrence Elery Wilson =

American politician

Lawrence Wilson

6th Lieutenant Governor of Arkansas
- In office January 12, 1931 – January 9, 1933
- Governor: Harvey Parnell
- Preceded by: Lee Cazort
- Succeeded by: Lee Cazort

Member of the Arkansas House of Representatives from the Ouachita County district
- In office January 10, 1927 – January 12, 1931
- Preceded by: Henry Hollensworth
- Succeeded by: R. K. Mason

Personal details
- Born: July 7, 1884 Village, Arkansas
- Died: June 23, 1946 (aged 61)
- Party: Democratic
- Occupation: Auditor, politician

Lawrence Elery Wilson (July 7, 1884 – June 23, 1946) was an American businessman and politician from South Arkansas. He served in the Arkansas House of Representatives from 1927 to 1931. He was the sixth lieutenant governor of Arkansas, serving under Governor Harvey Parnell until he was defeated by Lee Cazort in the Democratic primary.

== Early life ==
Wilson was born in Village, Arkansas to L.T. Wilson and Mattie (née Booth) Wilson on July 7, 1884. He had five brothers and one sister. He attended local schools, the Southwest Academy at Magnolia, and briefly taught school after graduation. He moved to Finn, Arkansas and worked as an auditor at the Grayson Lumber Company until 1918. He took a job with Watts Brothers in Camden, a rapidly growing economic center in the Arkansas Timberlands, in 1918. The region would soon have a small oil boom, further driving growth and prosperity.

== Political career ==
Wilson first won election as Ouachita County circuit and chancery clerk in November 1922. He held the position from January 1923 to January 1927. He won a seat in the Arkansas House of Representatives to represent Ouachita County in November 1926, and was seated in the 46th Arkansas General Assembly in January 1927. Wilson won reelection in November 1928.

=== Lieutenant governor ===
In 1930, Wilson sought the Democratic nomination for lieutenant governor. During the Solid South period, winning the Democratic nomination was tantamount to election in several Southern states, including Arkansas. The incumbent lieutenant governor, Lee Cazort had unsuccessfully challenged popular incumbent governor Harvey Parnell in the 1930 gubernatorial primary. The lieutenant governor position offered power; recently having been reestablished in 1926 after remaining vacant for twelve years while the position's legitimacy was disputed. Incumbent governor Harvey Parnell had ascended to political prominence as the first lieutenant governor in 1926, and the lieutenant governor assumed the full duties of the governor when he was out of state.

During this period, Wilson's political future seemed extremely bright. He earned high praise from The Camden News, saying "there are not many men in Arkansas more widely known or held in higher esteem for actual accomplishments, than Lawrence Wilson." The Polk County Examiner said "men like Lawrence Wilson are needed to guide the ship of state past the rocks of exploitation and graft" and "no more fit man can be found for the office to which he aspires". Upon winning the Democratic nomination, The Camden News printed a front-and-center photo under a headline "Camden to Welcome Victorious "Home Boy"" and described a planned parade from the Missouri-Pacific Train Depot to the Ouachita County Courthouse.

As lieutenant governor, Wilson served as President of the Arkansas Senate during the contentious 48th Arkansas General Assembly. Though all 35 members were Democrats, the party had split into two factions, requiring Wilson to use his vote as a tiebreaker on several occasions. Immediately after opening the session, Wilson was sued for recognizing R.E. Spence as senator from the First District. He was a gubernatorial appointment after his father, W. E. Spence, had resigned. The matter was decided by the Arkansas Supreme Court in favor of Wilson and R.E. Spence.

A rash of over 100 bankruptcies and financial institution collapses in 1930 was the first matter of business in the 48th General Assembly. Wilson appointed four senate members to an eight-member committee established to probe the cause of the failures.

On June 1, 1931, with Governor Parnell out of the state at French Lick, Indiana for a governor's conference, Lawrence Wilson used his position as Acting Governor to pardon his brother Fred Wilson from four counts of grand larceny in Union County. When interviewed, the Acting Governor said he "had no apologies to offer" saying he issued the pardon "on account of his grief stricken mother". This followed a similar use of furlough by Wilson in April freeing William R. Atkins, a bank robber from Hempstead County.

=== Reelection ===
Running for reelection in 1932, Wilson appealed to voters for a second term, with one campaign ad claiming Wilson was "entitled to a second term under the Democratic custom of two terms to an official who has been faithful to the trust imposed in him". Instead, he faced a field of six challengers in the Democratic primary, including previous lieutenant governor Lee Cazort, who he lost to.

Political offices
Preceded by Lee Cazort	Lieutenant Governor of Arkansas; January 12, 1931 – January 9, 1933	Succeeded by Lee Cazort
Preceded by Henry Hollensworth	Arkansas House of Representatives; Ouachita County District; January 10, 1927 – January 12, 1931	Succeeded by R. K. Mason
