= Judiciary of Arkansas =

Judicial branch of the Arkansas state government

The Flag of Arkansas

The Judiciary of Arkansas (officially the Judicial Department of Arkansas State Government) is the judicial branch of the Government of Arkansas, comprising all the courts of the State of Arkansas.

The Arkansas Supreme Court, sitting in Little Rock and consisting of seven judges, is the state's highest court, and in charge of administering the court system. The Arkansas Court of Appeals is the principal intermediate appellate court. The Arkansas Circuit Courts are the state trial court of general jurisdiction in civil and criminal cases.

== History ==
=== Colonial Period ===
The first European-style legal system encompassing the area now known as Arkansas was the civil law of French Louisiana during the colonial period. Small disputes were handled by local leaders, with significant criminal cases handled by French officials in New Orleans. In 1712, a Superior Council was established at New Orleans with jurisdiction over present-day Arkansas. Though ceded to Spain in 1762 and back to France in 1803, the area remained under a system based in civil law until the Louisiana Purchase in 1803.

=== Territorial period ===
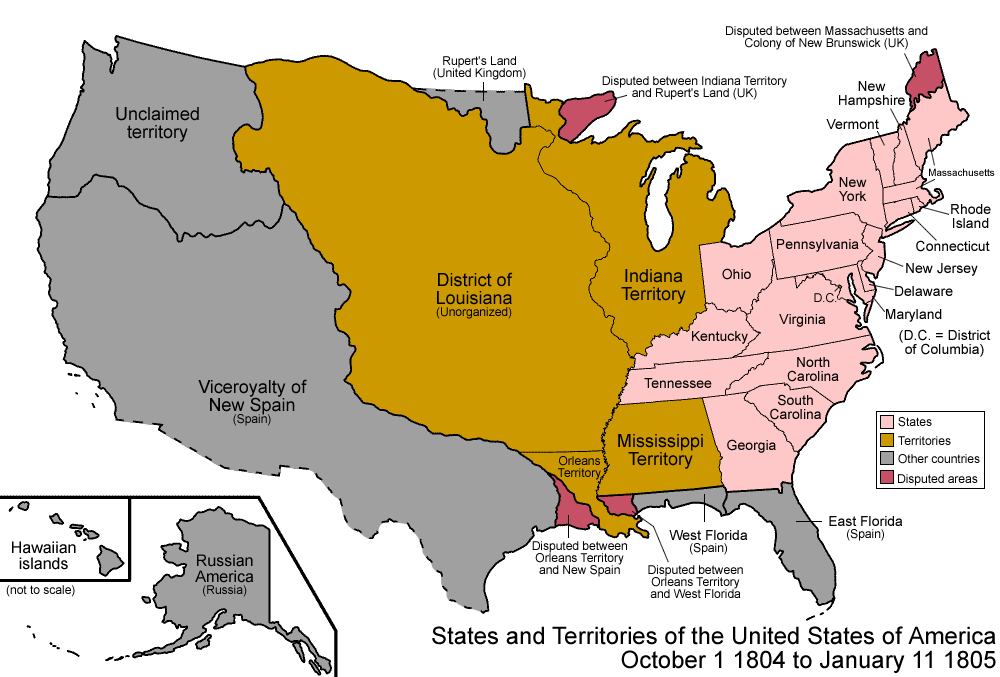
Map of the District of Louisiana in 1804, when present-day Arkansas became a common law jurisdiction

Following the purchase, present-day Arkansas became part of the District of Louisiana. The district encompassed all of the Louisiana Purchase lands north of the 33rd parallel, which serves as the present-day border between the states of Arkansas and Louisiana. Louisiana Purchase lands south of the 33rd parallel, the more densely populated Territory of Orleans, had a separate government and remained under civil law.

From October 1, 1804, until July 4, 1805, administrative powers of the lightly settled District of Louisiana were extended to the governor and judges of the Indiana Territory temporarily to establish a civil government for Louisiana Purchase. Local residents, who had previously lived under France's civil law, objected to many of the provisions of the U.S. government, including their imposition of common law. The Indiana Territory's temporary administration of the district of Louisiana lasted only nine months, until the Louisiana Territory was established, effective July 4, 1805, with its own territorial government. President of the United States Thomas Jefferson made three appointments to the Superior Court of the Louisiana Territory as part of his effort to establish the common law system.

The Louisiana Territorial Legislature subdivided the territory into six districts, including the Arkansas District on June 27, 1806. Justice for the Arkansas District was to be administered from the capital in St. Louis by a general court meeting twice a year, however, the Arkansas District was not formally organized until a proclamation by governor Meriwether Lewis on August 20, 1808. John W. Honey was appointed judge of the probate court; court was opened at Arkansas Post on December 12, 1808, with no business appearing before the court until December 18.

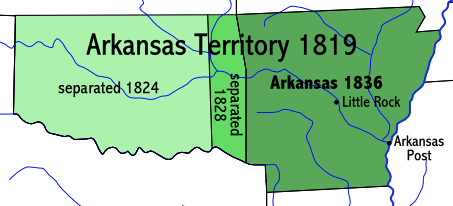
Map of Arkansas Territory showing capitols/seats of justice Arkansas Post (1819-1821) and Little Rock (1821-present)

After Louisiana statehood in 1812, the territory was renamed Missouri Territory. In 1812, the territory was divided into five counties; present-day Arkansas was initially included within New Madrid County, Missouri Territory until Arkansas County was created in 1813. Congress created an additional judicial position for the Territory on January 27, 1814, to be based at Arkansas Post and hold court twice a year. The first judicial proceedings in the records of Arkansas County took place June 20, 1814. Initially, formal justice was weak in the district, relying on judges and lawyers to travel from St. Louis, Ste. Genevieve, or Potosi, Missouri in order to hold court. The population of Arkansas Post was sufficiently small that a defendant in court one day could be a juror the next, and conflicts of interest abounded in the small community. Legal training was short, informal, or non-existent for early lawyers. Those who did not want to wait or felt wronged by this system often resorted to the duel or frontier justice.

Arkansas Territory was created March 2, 1819; President James Monroe appointed the first three judges to the Arkansas Superior Court, predecessor to the Arkansas Supreme Court, two days later. The Court heard cases at the territorial capitol of Arkansas Post, until the capitol was relocated to Little Rock in June 1821.

=== Statehood ===
The Constitution of Arkansas of 1836 created three separate departments of state government, and vested all judicial power with the judicial department. This separation has been explicitly maintained through the four subsequent Arkansas Constitutions. Initially, the judicial power was vested in "one Supreme Court, in Circuit Courts, in County Courts and in Justices of the Peace". The Supreme Court was an appellate court only, circuit courts were of record, county courts handled paternity and estate matters, and justices of the peace handled small matters as inferior courts. Circuit court judges were selected by the Arkansas General Assembly and presided over trial by jury in matters of law (in both civil and criminal cases) and sat as trier of fact in matters of equity. The constitution gave the General Assembly the ability to create corporation (city) courts "as may be deemed necessary" and chancery courts "when they deem expedient". Seven circuits were created in 1840, with "circuit riding" judges. An eighth circuit was created in 1846, but the seventh and eighth circuits were abolished in 1848, leaving only six circuits until after the Civil War.

The Pulaski Chancery Court was created in 1855 as the first chancery court, mostly to handle litigation from the failed Real Estate Bank of Arkansas.

== See also ==
- Courts of Arkansas
- Crime in Arkansas
