= 1930 Arkansas gubernatorial election =

- November 4, 1930
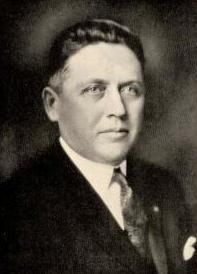
Nominee	Harvey Parnell	James Livesay
Party	Democratic	Republican
Popular vote	115,574	26,161
Percentage	81.54%	18.46%
- County results Parnell: 50–60% 60–70% 70–80% 80–90% >90% Livesay: 50–60% 70–80%
Governor before election
Harvey Parnell
Democratic
Elected Governor
Harvey Parnell
Democratic

The 1930 Arkansas gubernatorial election was held on November 4, 1930, to elect the governor of Arkansas, concurrently with the election to Arkansas's Class II U.S. Senate seat, as well as other elections to the United States Senate in other states and elections to the United States House of Representatives and various state and local elections.

Incumbent Democratic governor Harvey Parnell had won office in 1928, and was seeking reelection in 1930. During this period, it was customary for faithful governors to be reelected to a second term in Arkansas. In the Solid South, winning the Democratic primary was tantamount to election, a trend that resulted in Democratic control of the Arkansas Governor's Mansion from 1874 to 1967. Parnell won a seven-candidate primary, and was nominated by the party. The Republicans nominated James Livesay, a lawyer from Foreman in Little River County.

Parnell defeated Livesay in a landslide election, but would see his popularity decline sharply in the next two years, as the Dust Bowl and Great Depression damaged the Arkansas economy. Parnell's popular progressive programs from his first term would come under fire in his second term, with many claiming his highway modernization program and school reforms were bankrupting the state.

== Democratic primary ==
=== Results ===
Democratic primary, 1930
Party	Candidate	Votes	%
Democratic	Harvey Parnell (incumbent)	94,207	41.6
Democratic	Brooks Hays	57,497	25.4
Democratic	Tom Terral	34,476	15.2
Democratic	J. Carroll Cone	31,786	14.1
Democratic	R. K. Mason	3,398	1.5
Democratic	Ben L. Griffin	2,617	1.2
Democratic	J. R. Venable	2,205	1.0
Total votes		226,186	100.0

== Republicans ==
Republicans did not hold primaries in Arkansas until the 1960s, instead nominating their candidates at the state convention. James Livesay, a lawyer and judge from Foreman, was nominated as the Republican gubernatorial candidate.

== General election ==
=== Results ===
Arkansas gubernatorial election, 1930
Party	Candidate	Votes	%
Democratic	Harvey Parnell (incumbent)	115,574	81.54
Republican	James Livesay	26,161	18.46
Total votes		141,735	100.0
Democratic hold			
