= Robert L. Bailey =

Oklahoma legislator, attorney, politician

Judge of the Oklahoma Court of Civil Appeals
- In office 1987–1994
- Preceded by: Donald L. Howard
- Succeeded by: Larry E. Joplin
- In office 1970–1974
- Preceded by: Position established
- Succeeded by: Lester A. Reynolds

Member of the Oklahoma Senate from the 19th district
- In office 1959–1963
- Preceded by: Virgil Young
- Succeeded by: Hal L. Muldrow

Member of the Oklahoma House of Representatives from the Cleveland County district
- In office 1955–1959
- Preceded by: Virgil Young
- Succeeded by: Kenneth J. Poyner

District attorney
- In office 1951–1953

Personal details
- Party: Democratic Party

Robert L. “Bob” Bailey (August 28, 1922 – February 9, 2018) was an American lawyer, judge, and legislator.

== Early life and education ==
Bailey was born in Muskogee, Oklahoma, to Robert and Eva Bailey and was raised in Goodman, Missouri. He attended Northwestern University and the University of Oklahoma College of Law, graduating in 1948.

== Military service ==
Bailey served as a Navy Seabee in World War II, finished his education, then served in the Korean War in the office of the U.S. Army Judge Advocate General Corps.

== Legislative Service ==
Bailey was elected to two terms in the Oklahoma House of Representatives, from 1953-1954 and 1955-1956, and one term in the Oklahoma Senate, from 1957-1961. He served as a member of the Democratic Party.

== County Service ==
Bailey served as an Assistant County Attorney and then County Attorney after winning the election in 1951. He later served as the City Attorney for Moore, Oklahoma and Assistant District Attorney for Cleveland County.

== Oklahoma Court of Civil Appeals ==
Bailey was elected to the Oklahoma Court of Civil Appeals from 1970-1974 and again from 1987-1994.

== Additional Service ==
Bailey served on the Oklahoma Pardon and Parole Board, and as an “active retired” District Judge for Cleveland County. He helped develop and fund the State Highway 9/Interstate 35 bridge over the South Canadian River and Norman’s Lake Thunderbird. Further, Bailey served as President and Chairman of the Board of Oklahoma National Bank.
