= United States Bankruptcy Court for the Eastern and Western Districts of Arkansas =

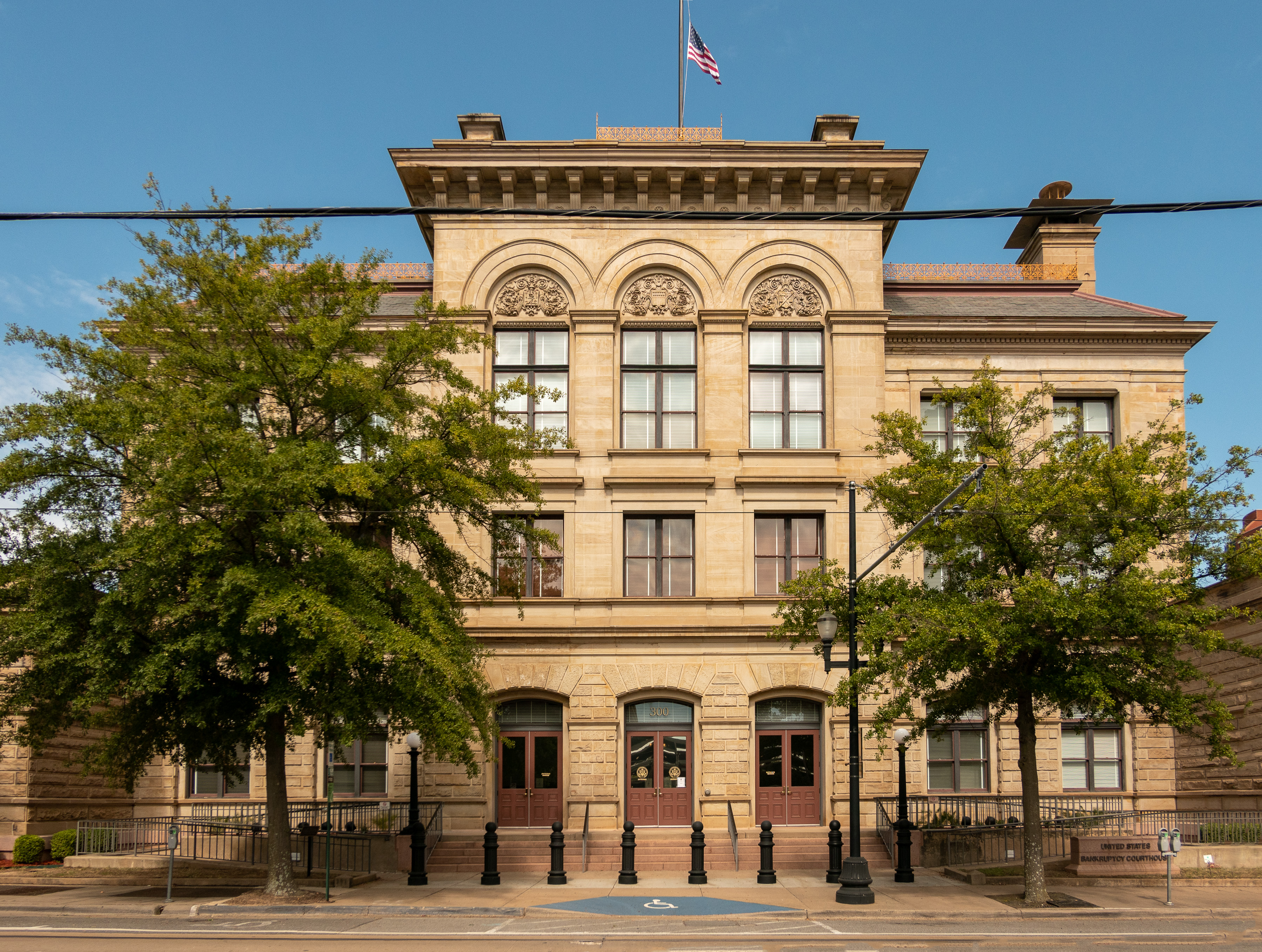
United States Bankruptcy Court, 300 W. 2nd Street in Little Rock

The United States Bankruptcy Court for the Eastern and Western Districts of Arkansas Arkansas is the federal bankruptcy court in Arkansas; it is the only bankruptcy court in the nation spanning two Districts. It is associated with the United States District Court for the Eastern District of Arkansas and the United States District Court for the Western District of Arkansas. The court’s main office is based in Little Rock with a divisional office in Fayetteville.

== Jurisdiction ==
The Eastern District of Arkansas is divided into five divisions:

Eastern Division	Cross, Lee, Monroe, Phillips, St. Francis, Woodruff
Jonesboro Division	Clay, Craighead, Crittenden, Greene, Lawrence, Mississippi, Poinsett, Randolph
Northern Division	Cleburne, Fulton, Independence, Izard, Jackson, Sharp, Stone
Pine Bluff Division	Arkansas, Chicot, Cleveland, Dallas, Desha, Drew, Grant, Jefferson, Lincoln
Western Division	Conway, Faulkner, Lonoke, Perry, Pope, Prairie, Pulaski, Saline, Van Buren, White, Yell

The Western District of Arkansas is divided into six divisions:

El Dorado Division	Ashley, Bradley, Calhoun, Columbia, Ouachita, Union
Fayetteville Division	Benton, Madison, Washington
Fort Smith Division	Crawford, Franklin, Johnson, Logan, Polk, Sebastian, Scott
Harrison Division	Baxter, Boone, Carroll, Marion, Newton, Searcy
Hot Springs Division	Clark, Garland, Hot Spring, Montgomery, Pike
Texarkana Division	Hempstead, Howard, Lafayette, Little River, Miller, Nevada, Sevier

== Judges ==
Judge	Appointed
Richard D. Taylor	2003
Phyllis M. Jones	2015
Bianca M. Rucker	2021

=== Former Judges/Referees ===
Name	Title	Service Dates
Patrick Callan Dooley	Referee	1898 – 1903
Marshall L. Stephenson	Referee	1898 – 1911
Joseph M. Hill	Referee	1898 – 1899
W. G. Phillips	Special Referee	1898 – 1911
Ambrose H. Sevier, Jr.	Referee	1898 – 1908
Edward B. Pierce	Referee	1899 – 1900
W. A. Falcmer	Referee	1900
E. L. Marlboro	Referee	1900
Laban H. Southmayd	Referee	1900 – 1919
Ebin W. Kimball	Special Referee	1902 – 1903
F. M. Garvin	Referee	1903 – 1919
Charles C. Waters	Referee	1903 – 1927
Joseph L. Shaw	Special Referee	1904
C. B. Moore	Referee	1908 – 1911
Charles F. Cole	Referee	1908 – 1922
Jesse Vinyard	Referee	1909
Samuel B. Woods, Jr.	Referee	1910
Leo J. Mundt	Referee	1911
John F. Simms	Referee	1911 – 1912
R. B. (George) Campbell	Referee	1911 – 1922
E. Foster Brown	Referee	1911 – 1925
Gustavos G. Pope	Referee	1913 – 1933
Daniel Hon	Referee	1919 – 1929
James W. Slover	Referee	1920 – 1928
John Bruce Cox	Referee	1921 – 1931
Ira J. Mack	Referee	1922
E. C. Horner	Referee	1922 – 1940
Powell Clayton	Referee	1923 – 1929
W. A. Carlton	Referee	1924 – 1928
Fred C. Mullinix	Referee	1926 – 1953
Andrew L. Kenney	Referee	1928 – 1931
A. A. McDonald	Referee	1929 – 1936
Joseph Hiram Schneider	Referee	1929 – 1938
Ben Henley	Referee	1931–1934, 1938–1943
R. D. Bogard	Referee	1933
Willis B. Smith	Referee	1933
L. B. Poindexter	Referee	1933 – 1936
Oscar E. Ellis	Referee	1935
Tom Hutson	Referee	1935
O. E. Jones	Referee	1935
Joe H. Snider	Referee	1935
S. W. Woods	Referee	1935 – 1937
J. O. Lynn	Referee	1936
John Joseph McCaleb	Referee	1936 – 1942
George O. Patterson	Referee	1936 – 1951
William Lee Cazort	Referee	1937 – 1961
B. Thomas Harper	Referee	1938 – 1942
Alex G. Sanderson	Referee	1940
Suzanne Lighten	Referee	1941
G. Byron Dobbs	Referee	1942
J. Smith Henley	Referee	1944 – 1945
John Brizzola	Referee	1945 – 1946
W. D. Murphy	Referee	1945 – 1947
Cad L. Polk, Jr.	Referee	1946 – 1947
Edgar Bethel	Referee	1947 – 1954
Arnold M. Adams	Referee/Judge	1962 – 1982
Charles W. Baker	Referee/Judge	1973 – 1984
Robert F. Fussell	Judge	1983 – 2003
James G. Mixon	Judge	1984 – 2014
Mary Davies Scott	Judge	1987 – 2002
Audrey R. Evans	Judge	2002 – 2015
Ben T. Barry	Judge	2007 – 2021

== Clerks of Court ==
Name	Service
Peggy A. Carroll	1979 – 1999
Bill Blevins	1999 – 2001
Jean Rolfs	2002– 2019
Linda McCormack	2019–present

== History ==
The Bankruptcy Act of 1898 (Act of July 1, 1898, ch. 541, 30 Stat. 544) was the first permanent bankruptcy law and remained in effect until the passage of the Bankruptcy Reform Act of 1978 (Pub. L. 95–598, 92 Stat. 2549, November 6, 1978). The 1898 Act created "courts of bankruptcy" defined as the district courts of the United States. The 1898 Act also created the office of referee. The referee was appointed for two-year terms by the District Court. The 1978 Act established United States bankruptcy courts in each federal judicial district with their own clerks and other staff. The first bankruptcy clerk's office was located at the Richard Sheppard Arnold United States Post Office and Courthouse, 600 W. Capitol Avenue, Little Rock, Arkansas. In 1993, a staffed divisional office was opened in the John Paul Hammerschmidt Federal Building in Fayetteville, Arkansas. In 1997, the bankruptcy court moved to its current location in the newly renovated Old Post Office and Courthouse (aka Old Post Office and Customs House or the Old Federal Building) located at 300 W. 2nd Street in Little Rock.
