= List of mayors of Bentonville, Arkansas =

The following is a list of mayors of the city of Bentonville, Arkansas, United States.

- E.S. McDanile, c.1886
- W.S. Floyd, c.1887
- N.B. Cotton, c.1891
- J.B. Patterson, c.1894, 1900
- J.C. Franc, c.1895
- L.P. Peyton, c.1896
- W.H. Coonie, c.1897
- C.M. Rice, c.1897
- W.A. Dickson, c.1898
- Ben S. Terry, c.1898
- Marion Douglas, 1902–1903
- W.O. Young, c.1904
- A.W. Morris, c.1908
- T.O. Tucker, c.1909
- H.G. Lindsay, c.1910
- W.T. Robertson, 1912–1913
- Richard Rice, c.1913–1914
- R.O. Pickens, c.1916, 1932
- J.T. McGill, c.1917
- Volt T. Lindsey, c.1920
- Lee Seamster, 1921–1922
- Tom Curt, c.1923
- Jeff R. Rice, c.1927
- Sam Beasley, c.1932
- E.O. Lefors, c.1935
- D.W. Peel Jr., 1941–1946
- J.C. Knott, 1946
- Juanita Wyman, 1950
- Alvin Seamster, 1950–1957
- J.N. Cavness, 1957–1961
- Wayne Lawson, 1961–1965
- John Wright, 1965–1967
- G.J. Bonds, 1967–1971
- Earnest Lawrence, 1971–1975
- C.E. Lewallen, 1975–1976
- Ron Mcmaster, 1976
- Steve Marquess, 1976–1979
- Richard W. Hoback, 1979–1986
- David Ford, 1986
- Steve Bertschy, 1986–1990
- Don O'Neal, 1991–1994
- John W. Fryer, 1994
- Terry Black Coberly, 1995–2006
- Robert McCaslin, 2007–2018
- Stephanie Orman, 2019–present

== See also ==
- Bentonville history
- List of mayors of places in Arkansas
