= Drew Bowers =

American politician

- Born: Milton Drew Bowers, Jr. October 19, 1886; Randolph County, Arkansas, U.S.
- Died: December 15, 1985 (aged 99); Little Rock, Arkansas, U.S.
- Education: University of Arkansas
- Occupations: Schoolteacher, lawyer
- Political party: Republican

Drew Bowers (October 19, 1886 – December 15, 1985) was the Republican nominee for governor of Arkansas in 1926 and 1928.

== Early life and education ==
Milton Drew Bowers, Jr., was born in Randolph County, Arkansas. He was the eighth of 15 children of Milton Drew "Mitt" Bowers Sr. (1850–1914), a Baptist minister and a native of Palmyra, in Montgomery County near Clarksville in northern Tennessee. The senior Bowers served in the 1899 session of the Arkansas House of Representatives. Bowers's mother, the former Lucinda Angelina Pratt (1855–1934), a native of Ironton, in Iron County in southeastern Missouri, was a daughter of Jesse Richardson Pratt and his second wife, the former Elizabeth Gibson.

Bowers attended the Ouachita-Maynard Academy in Maynard in Randolph County. This institution was one of the forerunners of Ouachita Baptist University in Arkadelphia in Clark County. Bowers then enrolled at the University of Arkansas at Fayetteville, from which he procured a teacher's certificate in 1906 and was involved in the debate team while enrolled.

== Career ==
Bowers taught school at rural Clearview in Randolph County. Meanwhile, he studied law in the offices of lawyer friends in Pocahontas and in 1913 was admitted to the state bar. He ran unsuccessfully as a Republican for the Arkansas House in both 1908 and 1916 and for the United States House of Representatives in 1924. In his two consecutive bids for governor, he was defeated by the Democrats John Ellis Martineau and Harvey Parnell. He polled 23.6 percent of the general election vote in 1926; 22.7 percent in 1928. In the latter election year, U.S. Senator Joseph T. Robinson was the vice presidential nominee on the Al Smith Democratic ticket, which won the electoral votes of Arkansas.

In 1925, during the Calvin Coolidge administration, Bowers was appointed Assistant United States Attorney. After eleven years in that position, also under Presidents Herbert Hoover and Franklin D. Roosevelt, Bowers resigned in 1936 to enter private practice. In 1953, the Dwight D. Eisenhower administration recalled him as Assistant United States Attorney. He retired from the federal position in 1962 at the age of seventy-six and returned to the private practice of law. In 1977, at the age of ninety, Bowers retired from his law practice. He died in 1985 in Little Rock at the age of ninety-nine.

Osro Cobb, the chairman of the Arkansas Republican Party from 1932 to 1955 and a legal associate of Bowers, recalled his friend, accordingly:

Drew Bowers was the finest trial lawyer I ever met. Mr. Bowers had a photographic memory. When he quoted the testimony of a witness in argument, it would be word-for-word—with voice inflections highly similar to those of the witness. Working with Mr. Bowers was a fruitful, unforgettable experience. I recall that we persuaded him on rather short notice one day to go to Stuttgart (in Arkansas County) to try a nongovernment tort damage case in which we had filed a cross complaint for $2,500. When Mr. Bowers arrived in court, Circuit Judge W. J. Waggoner was selecting a jury for the case preceding ours. The judge motioned for Mr. Bowers to approach the bench. He then arose, handed the gavel to Mr. Bowers, and asked him to preside while he was getting a haircut and attending to some personal matters!

Mr. Bowers took the bench and proceeded with the case. The jury was selected, opening statements were made by counsel, and the plaintiff had called its first witness by the time Judge Waggoner returned. Fortunately, our case was next. It was one in which we felt we had a strong defense and counter claim. Mr. Bowers demolished the opposition and obtained a judgment for the full amount of our counter claim. Mr. Bowers much preferred criminal cases, but he always did a good job on civil cases, too.

When Cobb was named U.S. Attorney for the Eastern District of Arkansas, he asked the Eisenhower administration to waive age requirements so that Bowers, who had good physical health, could remain as the assistant U. S. attorney. In his memoirs, Cobb recalls another incident involving Bowers:

We were trying a criminal case for the government. Mr. Bowers was left-handed and he had the habit of pacing in front of the jury box during argument and flinging his arms to emphasize his remarks. Mr. Bowers reached a point directly in front of a juror seated at one end of the front row of the jury and suddenly thrust his left hand forward to make a point. The juror, who was a large man slumped in his chair, had an involuntary reaction that caused him to lose his balance, fall out of his chair and the jury box onto the floor.

Mr. Bowers and I rushed to help the fallen juror, who fortunately was not injured. After a short recess, the trial resumed, and the jury convicted the defendant. The incident caused an uproar and much chuckling, including from the judge.

== Later life ==
On October 24, 1974, the U.S. District Court in Little Rock observed "Drew Bowers Day" in honor of the attorney's 88th birthday and his sixty-one years of legal practice. Bowers's papers are deposited at the University of Arkansas at Little Rock.

Party political offices
Preceded by John W. Grabiel	Republican nominee for Governor of Arkansas; 1926, 1928	Succeeded by J. O. Livesay
