= John Ellis Martineau =

American judge

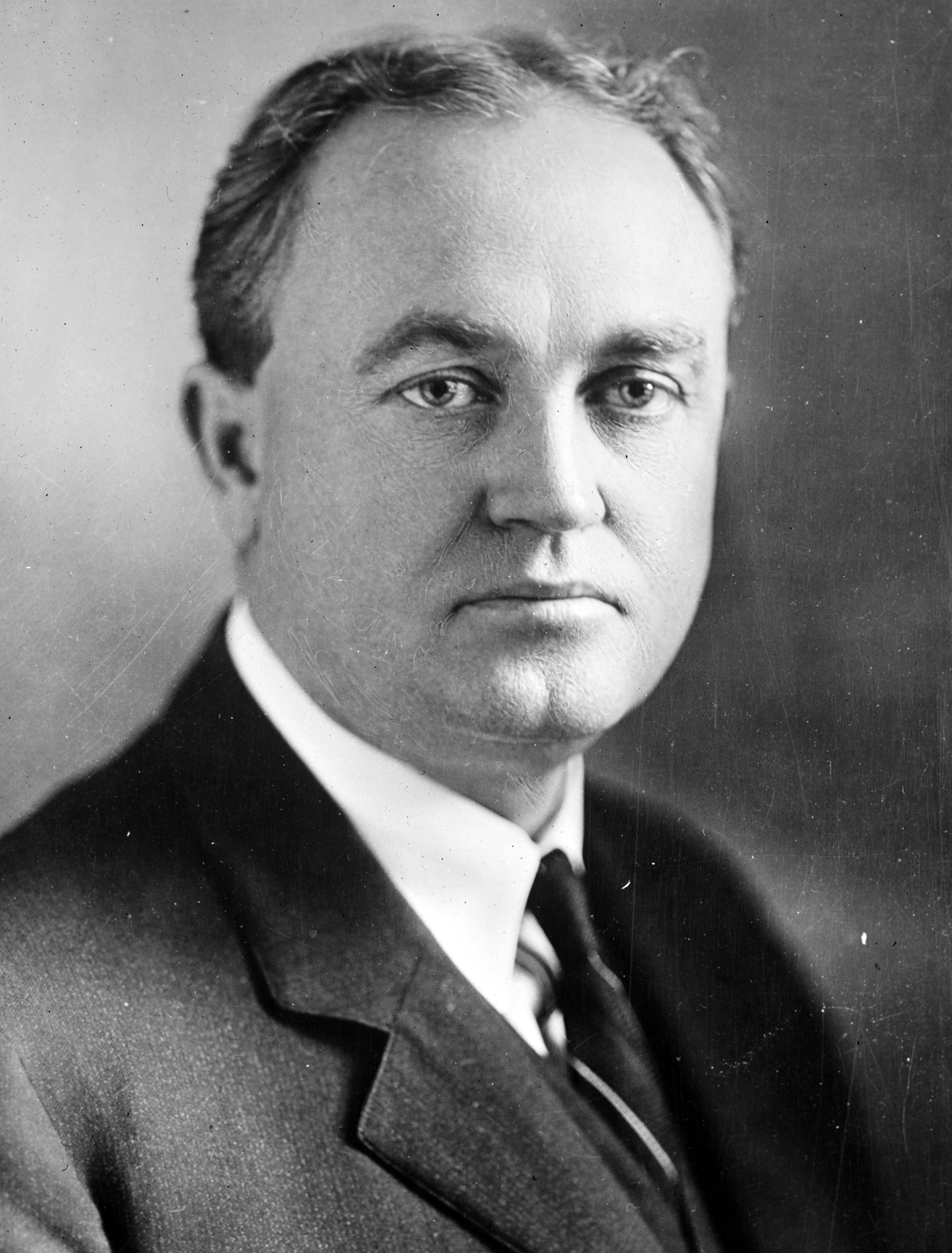

Judge of the United States District Court for the Eastern District of Arkansas
- In office March 2, 1928 – March 6, 1937
- Appointed by: Calvin Coolidge
- Preceded by: Jacob Trieber
- Succeeded by: Thomas Clark Trimble III

28th Governor of Arkansas
- In office January 11, 1927 – March 4, 1928
- Lieutenant: Harvey Parnell
- Preceded by: Tom Terral
- Succeeded by: Harvey Parnell

Personal details
- Born: John Ellis Martineau; December 2, 1873 Clay County, Missouri, U.S.
- Died: March 6, 1937 (aged 63)
- Resting place: Roselawn Memorial Park; Little Rock, Arkansas
- Party: Democratic
- Education: University of Arkansas (A.B.); University of Arkansas School of Law (LL.B.)

John Ellis Martineau (December 2, 1873 – March 6, 1937) was the 28th governor of Arkansas and was a United States district judge of the United States District Court for the Eastern District of Arkansas. His term as Governor was marked by the Great Mississippi Flood of 1927, with Martineau serving as President of the Tri-State Flood Commission.

== Education and career ==
Born on December 2, 1873, in Clay County, Missouri, to Sarah Hetty Lamb and Gregory Martineau, a farmer recently arrived from Quebec, Canada, Martineau received an Artium Baccalaureus degree in 1896 from the Arkansas Industrial University (now the University of Arkansas) and a Bachelor of Laws in 1899 from the University of Arkansas School of Law. He entered private practice in Little Rock, Arkansas starting in 1899. He was a member of the Arkansas House of Representatives from 1903 to 1905. He was a Chancellor for the Arkansas Chancery Court for the First Chancery District from 1907 to 1927.

=== Grant of habeas corpus ===
While serving on the chancery court, Martineau issued a writ of habeas corpus for defendants in the criminal prosecutions arising out of the Elaine massacre in Phillips County in eastern Arkansas. Although the Arkansas Supreme Court later vacated that order, it allowed the defendants enough time to avoid execution and to seek habeas corpus relief in federal court. Their guilty verdicts were eventually reversed by the United States Supreme Court in its decision in Moore v. Dempsey.

== Gubernatorial service ==
Martineau ran unsuccessfully for Governor of Arkansas in the 1924 Democratic primary. In 1926, he unseated in the primary the one-term incumbent Tom Jefferson Terral and then defeated in the general election the Republican attorney Drew Bowers, originally from Pocahontas in Randolph County, in northeastern Arkansas. Martineau received 76.5 percent of the vote to Bowers's 23.6 percent. Bowers was an Assistant United States Attorney for the Eastern District of Arkansas in both the Coolidge and Eisenhower administrations. Martineau left office early to accept a federal judgeship.

=== Achievements as governor ===
Martineau was the first Governor of Arkansas to broadcast his inaugural address on radio. The Martineau administration established a Confederate pensions board and authorized state aid to cities for highway construction through the Martineau Road Plan. Martineau was forced to deal with a major crisis when the Mississippi River broke free of its banks and covered 13 percent of the state during the Great Mississippi Flood of 1927. Martineau was named President of the Tri-State Flood Commission. In May 1927, Martineau called out the National Guard in response to the lynching of an African-American prisoner by a mob of 2,000 to 5,000 people in Little Rock. Martineau earned the reputation of fairness, integrity, and as a progressive politician. His role in state politics and effective management of crisis situations further secured his reputation as one of Arkansas better governors and brought him national attention.

== Federal judicial service ==
Martineau was nominated by President Calvin Coolidge on March 2, 1928, to a seat on the United States District Court for the Eastern District of Arkansas vacated by Judge Jacob Trieber. He was confirmed by the United States Senate on March 2, 1928, and received his commission the same day. His service terminated on March 6, 1937, due to his death. He was interred in Roselawn Memorial Park in Little Rock.

== Memberships ==
Martineau was a member of the secret society, Knights of Pythias, and the fraternal organization of the Freemasons Martineau is an 1894 initiate of Kappa Sigma - Xi chapter at the University of Arkansas. Contemporaries of Martineau at Xi Chapter included future State Senator and acting Arkansas Governor Xenophon Overton Pindall, future acting Governor Michael Pleasant Huddleston, future Federal Judge Thomas Clark Trimble III, and future Congressman and Federal Judge Samuel Billingsley Hill.

== See also ==
- List of governors of Arkansas
- Moore v. Dempsey

Party political offices
Preceded by Tom Terral	Democratic nominee for Governor of Arkansas; 1926	Succeeded by Harvey Parnell
Political offices
Preceded by Tom Terral	Governor of Arkansas; 1927–1928	Succeeded by Harvey Parnell
Legal offices
Preceded by Jacob Trieber	Judge of the United States District Court for the Eastern District of Arkansas; 1928–1937	Succeeded by Thomas Clark Trimble III
