= Harvey Parnell =

29th Governor of Arkansas

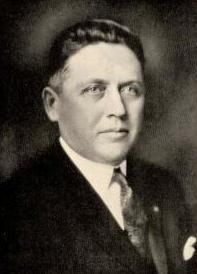

29th Governor of Arkansas
- In office March 4, 1928 – January 10, 1933
- Lieutenant: Lee Cazort; Lawrence Wilson
- Preceded by: John Martineau
- Succeeded by: Junius Marion Futrell

4th Lieutenant Governor of Arkansas
- In office January 10, 1927 – March 4, 1928
- Governor: John Martineau
- Preceded by: Volney V. Smith (1874)
- Succeeded by: Lee Cazort

Member of the Arkansas Senate from the 15th district
- In office January 8, 1923 – January 10, 1927
- Preceded by: J. R. Woods
- Succeeded by: J. H. Hall

Member of the Arkansas House of Representatives from the Chicot County district
- In office January 13, 1919 – January 8, 1923
- Preceded by: Baldi Vinson
- Succeeded by: O. C. Burnside

Personal details
- Born: February 28, 1880 Cleveland County, Arkansas, U.S.
- Died: January 16, 1936 (aged 55) Little Rock, Arkansas, U.S.
- Resting place: Roselawn Memorial Park Cemetery in Little Rock, Arkansas
- Party: Democratic
- Profession: Farmer

Harvey Parnell (February 28, 1880 – January 16, 1936) was an American farmer and politician from Southeast Arkansas. Parnell served in the Arkansas General Assembly for eight years, first in the Arkansas House of Representatives, and later serving a term in the Arkansas Senate. Following the re-establishment of the lieutenant governor position, Parnell won the statewide election and served under Governor John Martineau. When Martineau resigned to take a federal judgeship in March 1928, Parnell was elevated to become the state's 29th governor, a position he would hold until 1933. Early in his time as governor, Parnell was responsible for Progressive reforms popular with rural voters, including expansion and modernization of the highway system and public school reform. But as the Dust Bowl and Great Depression ravaged the Arkansas economy, Parnell's programs were blamed for bankrupting the state, and his popularity plummeted. He left politics after his second full gubernatorial term ended in January 1933.

== Biography ==
Parnell was born in Orlando in Cleveland County in South Arkansas. Parnell attended public schools and graduated from Warren High School in Warren, Arkansas. After graduation, he worked as a bookkeeper and store clerk and farmed in Chicot County in Southeast Arkansas.

== Early career ==
Elected in 1918, Parnell was a member of the Arkansas House of Representatives from 1919 to 1921. In 1922, Parnell was elected to the Arkansas Senate, representing Ashley and Chicot counties.

In 1927, he assumed the post of Lieutenant Governor of Arkansas and the next year was elevated to the office of governor when John Ellis Martineau resigned to become a federal judge.

== Governor ==
=== First term ===
Entering the 1928 gubernatorial election, Parnell sought a term as governor in his own right. Parnell defeated future U.S. Representative Brooks Hays of Little Rock in the Democratic primary. Parnell easily defeated Republican challenger Drew Bowers, 77.3 to 22.7 percent. Bowers, an attorney from Pocahontas, had also been the GOP gubernatorial nominee in 1926, when he was defeated by Martineau by a similar margin.

=== Second term ===
County results, 1930 gubernatorial Parnell: 50–60% 60–70% 70–80% 80–90% 90%+ Livesay: 50–60% 60–70% 70–80%

Parnell sought a second term in 1930, an election usually assured to faithful Arkansas politicians in this era. Parnell again defeated Hays in the 1930 Democratic Primary. He also fended off a challenge from Lee Cazort, who had resigned as lieutenant governor to challenge Parnell in the primary, though he withdrew and supported Cazort before the primary was held. In the 1930 gubernatorial election, Parnell defeated the Republican J. O. Livesay, a district judge from Foreman in Little River County in Southwest Arkansas. Livesay had lost a Republican race for the United States House of Representatives in 1912 from Arkansas's 4th congressional district.

The Republicans ran a newspaper advertisement prior to the 1930 general election in which it claimed the Democrats had given Arkansas "Inefficiency, wanton waste, coercive machine rule, and government for private gain at public expense." The GOP pledged instead a "clean business administration, substantial tax reductions, honest audits, law enforcement, industrial leadership, and real statesmanship." The notice pleaded with voters to "go to the polls and vote for Arkansas instead of self-seeking politicians." Livesay also had a running-mate for lieutenant governor, C. H. Harding, a Pennsylvania native who was the president of the Fort Smith Building and Loan Association in Fort Smith.

Osro Cobb of Montgomery County, the only Republican member of the Arkansas House at the time, did not seek a third two-year term but managed Livesay's race against Parnell. Livesay finished with only 18.8 percent of the vote. Cobb noted that Republicans at the time had no representation on Arkansas election boards and were not guaranteed precinct watcher positions. Therefore, he considered Livesay's small vote "suspect," meaning it could have been larger had there been a way to check for fraud. Six years later, in 1936, Cobb was himself his party's unsuccessful gubernatorial nominee against the Democrat Carl Bailey.

=== Legacy ===
The Parnell administration focused on establishing a state highway fund, creating a Bureau of Commerce and Industry, and upgrading the school system. Henderson State Teachers College in Arkadelphia was also created under Parnell. Parnell himself was a consistent supporter of women's suffrage and appointed Hattie Caraway to the United States Senate. Caraway would later win election for the office and become the first woman elected to the Senate.

Many Arkansans blamed Parnell for their situation as the Great Depression began, and he left office in 1933 to return to farming. He later worked for the Reconstruction Finance Corporation for three years.

== Death ==
Harvey Parnell died in Little Rock and is interred at Roselawn Memorial Park Cemetery.

== Trivia ==
The singer-songwriter Johnny Cash was born in Kingsland, Arkansas on February 26, 1932, during Parnell's term as governor.

== See also ==
- List of governors of Arkansas

Party political offices
Preceded by John Ellis Martineau	Democratic nominee for Governor of Arkansas; 1928, 1930	Succeeded by Junius Marion Futrell
Political offices
Preceded by John Martineau	Governor of Arkansas; March 4, 1928 – January 10, 1933	Succeeded by Junius Marion Futrell
Preceded by Position established	Lieutenant Governor of Arkansas; January 10, 1927 – March 4, 1928	Succeeded by Lee Cazort
Preceded by J. R. Woods	Arkansas Senate; Fifteenth District; January 8, 1923 – January 10, 1927	Succeeded by J. H. Hall
Preceded by Baldi Vinson	Arkansas House of Representatives; Chicot County District; January 13, 1919 – January 8, 1923	Succeeded by O. C. Burnside
