= Junius Marion Futrell =

30th governor of Arkansas

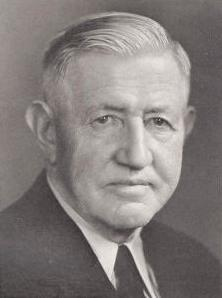

30th Governor of Arkansas
- In office January 10, 1933 – January 12, 1937
- Lieutenant: William Lee Cazort
- Preceded by: Harvey Parnell
- Succeeded by: Carl Edward Bailey
- In office March 13, 1913 – July 23, 1913; Acting
- Preceded by: William Kavanaugh Oldham (acting)
- Succeeded by: George Washington Hays

Circuit Court Judge for the Second Judicial District of Arkansas
- In office 1922–1933

Member of the Arkansas Senate
- In office 1913–1917

Member of the Arkansas House of Representatives
- In office 1896–1904

Personal details
- Born: August 14, 1870 Greene County, Arkansas, U.S.
- Died: June 20, 1955 (aged 84) Little Rock, Arkansas, U.S.
- Resting place: Linwood Cemetery, Paragould, Arkansas
- Party: Democratic
- Spouse: Tera A. Smith
- Education: University of Arkansas School of Law
- Profession: Lawyer, farmer

Junius Marion Futrell (August 14, 1870 – June 20, 1955) was an American attorney who served as the 30th governor of Arkansas from 1933 to 1937, and the acting governor for a short period in 1913. He also served in the Arkansas House of Representatives and Arkansas Senate including as president of the Arkansas Senate.

== Early life ==
Futrell was born in Jones Ridge in Greene County in northeastern Arkansas to parents Jepthra and Arminia Levonica Eubanks Futrell. The second of three children, he attended the Arkansas Industrial University, now the University of Arkansas School of Law, from 1892 to 1893. After his sophomore year, he taught school in several Arkansas counties until 1896, marrying Tera A. Smith on September 27, 1893. Futrell also farmed and worked in the timber industry before entering politics.

== Career ==
Futrell was elected to the Arkansas House of Representatives and served from 1896 to 1904. He was elected Circuit Court Clerk from 1906 to 1910.

Futrell was elected to the Arkansas Senate and served from 1913 to 1917. He was the Senate President from 1915 to 1917. While President of the Senate, he served as acting governor for four months in 1913 after Governor Joseph Taylor Robinson resigned.

Futrell was admitted to the bar in Arkansas in 1913 and practiced law in Paragould until his 1922 appointment to the Second Division of the Second Circuit Court. In 1923, he moved to the Twelfth Chancery Circuit.

Futrell was elected to a full term as governor in his own right in the 1932 election and reelected in 1934. In the 1932 general election, Futrell defeated the Republican J. O. Livesay, a lawyer from Foreman, who had also been the gubernatorial nominee against Harvey Parnell in 1930. Livesay finished the race with 8.9 percent of the vote, less than half his percent polled in 1930.

As governor, he opposed state funding for education beyond the eighth grade, believing the federal government should provide such support.

The Futrell administration established the Arkansas State Planning Board and created the Arkansas Department of Public Welfare. His administration also rescinded prohibition and instituted some legalized gambling.

According to one study, Futrell was Arkansas's "most conservative governor in decades".

After leaving office, Futrell returned to the practice of law.

== Death ==
Futrell died in 1955 in Little Rock and is interred at Linwood Cemetery in Paragould. He had suffered a severe stroke on July 4, 1948. Survivors included two sons and four daughters.

== See also ==
- List of governors of Arkansas

Party political offices
Preceded by Harvey Parnell	Democratic nominee for Governor of Arkansas; 1932, 1934	Succeeded by Carl E. Bailey
Political offices
Preceded by William Kavanaugh Oldham; Acting Governor	Acting Governor of Arkansas; 1913	Succeeded by George Washington Hays; Governor
Preceded by Harvey Parnell	Governor of Arkansas; 1933–1937	Succeeded by Carl Edward Bailey
