= Tom Terral =

27th governor of Arkansas

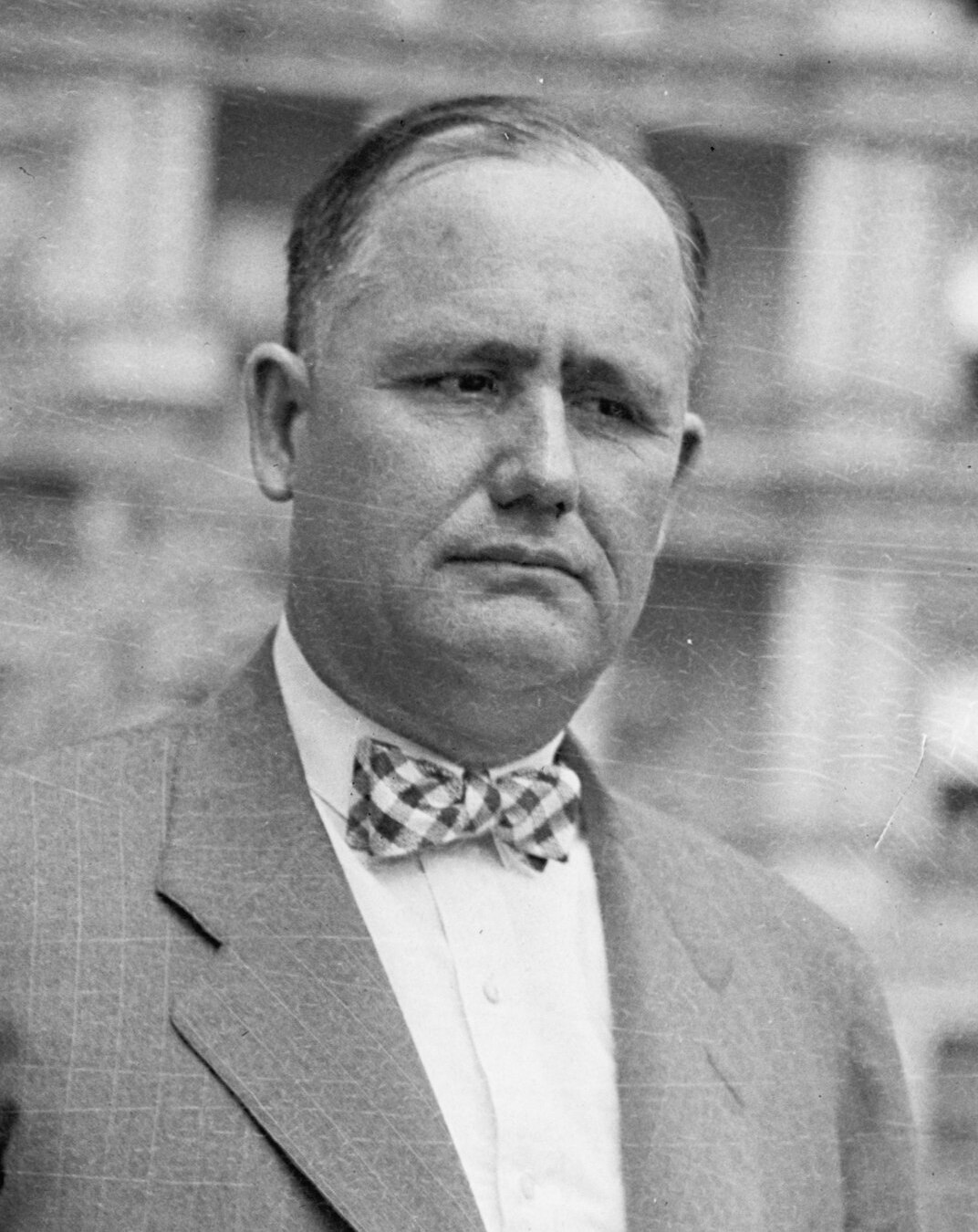

27th Governor of Arkansas
- In office January 13, 1925 – January 11, 1927
- Preceded by: Thomas Chipman McRae
- Succeeded by: John Ellis Martineau

Arkansas Secretary of State
- In office 1917–1921
- Governor: Charles Hillman Brough
- Preceded by: Earle W. Hodges
- Succeeded by: Ira C. Hopper

Personal details
- Born: Thomas Jefferson Terral; December 21, 1882 Union Parish, Louisiana, U.S.
- Died: March 9, 1946 (aged 63) Little Rock, Arkansas, U.S.
- Resting place: Roselawn Memorial Park Cemetery in Little Rock
- Party: Democratic
- Spouse: Eula Terral
- Education: University of Kentucky; University of Arkansas

Thomas Jefferson Terral (December 21, 1882 – March 9, 1946) was an American attorney and the 27th governor of Arkansas, serving one term from 1925 to 1927.

== Early life ==
Terral was born in Union Parish in northern Louisiana. He attended the University of Kentucky at Lexington, Kentucky and transferred to the University of Arkansas School of Law in Fayetteville from which he graduated in 1910.

=== Early career ===
He was admitted to the bar in 1910 and established a private law practice in Little Rock. He also worked as a school teacher.

== Career ==
From 1911 to 1915, Terral worked as an assistant secretary of the Arkansas Senate where he learned the mechanics of state politics. In addition to the Senate position, Terral served as deputy state superintendent of public instruction from 1912 to 1916. These dual positions allowed Terral to assemble a range of statewide political contacts.

=== State politics ===
In 1916, Terral was elected Arkansas Secretary of State and served two two-year terms from 1917 to 1921.

=== Campaigns for governor ===
He ran unsuccessfully for governor in the 1920 Democratic primary, having lost to Thomas Chipman McRae.

Preparing to run again for governor in 1924, Terral was made an honorary member of the Ku Klux Klan in Morehouse Parish, which adjoins his native Union Parish. He had been rejected for Klan membership by various chapters in Arkansas but wanted to show his commitment to the organization as he mounted his gubernatorial race. In the Democratic primary, prior to the institution of runoff elections in Arkansas, Terral defeated several opponents, including future Lieutenant Governor William Lee Cazort of Johnson County, the original choice of the Ku Klux Klan hierarchy. Terral also defeated John Ellis Martineau, who came back in 1926 to unseat Terral in the primary. In the general election held that year in October 1924, Terral defeated Republican John W. Grabiel, an Ohio native and an attorney from Fayetteville who had also run unsuccessfully against Governor McRae in 1922. Terral received 99,598 votes (79.8 percent) to Grabiel's 25,152 (20.2 percent). Terral served as governor from 1925 to 1927.

=== Tenure as governor ===
During Terral's term the first state park was opened at Petit Jean Mountain. Construction of the state hospital was commenced during his tenure and the post of Commissioner of Insurance and Revenue was created. After one term, Terral was unseated in the Democratic primary by Martineau, who accused him of having previously taken kickbacks from publishers in developing the state-approved list of public school textbooks. Terral would become the first of three Arkansas governors denied second terms. The others were Francis Cherry, and Frank White.

== Death ==
After his term as governor, Terral made three unsuccessful comeback bids for Governor and returned to his private law practice in Little Rock, where he died in 1946. Terral is interred at Roselawn Memorial Park Cemetery in Little Rock.

He and his wife, Eula Terral (same maiden and married names), originally from Pine Bluff in Jefferson County, had no children.

== See also ==
- List of governors of Arkansas

Party political offices
Preceded by Thomas Chipman McRae	Democratic nominee for Governor of Arkansas; 1924	Succeeded by John Ellis Martineau
Political offices
Preceded by Earle W. Hodges	Secretary of State of Arkansas; 1917–1921	Succeeded by Ira C. Hopper
Preceded by Thomas Chipman McRae	Governor of Arkansas; 1925–1927	Succeeded by John Ellis Martineau
