= List of elections in 1942 =

The following elections occurred in the year 1942.

== Africa ==
- 1942 Egyptian parliamentary election

== Asia ==
- 1942 Egyptian parliamentary election
- 1942 Japanese general election

== Europe ==
- 1942 Irish local elections
- 1942 Liechtenstein local elections
- 1942 Swiss referendums

=== Iceland ===
- July 1942 Icelandic parliamentary election
- October 1942 Icelandic parliamentary election

=== Portugal ===
- 1942 Portuguese legislative election
- 1942 Portuguese presidential election

=== United Kingdom ===
- 1942 Cardiff East by-election
- 1942 Glasgow Cathcart by-election
- 1942 Grantham by-election
- 1942 Ince by-election
- 1942 Llandaff and Barry by-election
- 1942 Maldon by-election
- 1942 Manchester Clayton by-election
- 1942 Manchester Gorton by-election
- 1942 Newcastle-under-Lyme by-election
- 1942 North East Derbyshire by-election
- 1942 Nuneaton by-election
- 1942 Poplar South by-election
- 1942 Putney by-election
- 1942 Rothwell by-election
- 1942 Rugby by-election
- 1942 Salisbury by-election
- 1942 Spennymoor by-election
- 1942 Whitechapel and St George's by-election
- 1942 Windsor by-election

== Central America ==
- 1942 Costa Rican parliamentary election
- 1942 Honduran legislative election

== North America ==
=== Canada ===
- 1942 Edmonton municipal election
- 1942 Ottawa municipal election
- 1942 Toronto municipal election

=== Caribbean ===
- 1942 Cuban parliamentary election
- 1942 Dominican Republic general election

=== United States ===
- 1942 New York state election
- 1942 United States elections

==== United States lieutenant gubernatorial ====
- 1942 Alabama lieutenant gubernatorial election
- 1942 California lieutenant gubernatorial election
- 1942 Connecticut lieutenant gubernatorial election
- 1942 Minnesota lieutenant gubernatorial election
- 1942 Nebraska lieutenant gubernatorial election
- 1942 Texas lieutenant gubernatorial election
- 1942 Wisconsin lieutenant gubernatorial election

==== United States gubernatorial ====
- 1942 Alabama gubernatorial election
- 1942 Arizona gubernatorial election
- 1942 Arkansas gubernatorial election
- 1942 California gubernatorial election
- 1942 Colorado gubernatorial election
- 1942 Connecticut gubernatorial election
- 1942 Georgia gubernatorial election
- 1942 Idaho gubernatorial election
- 1942 Iowa gubernatorial election
- 1942 Kansas gubernatorial election
- 1942 Maine gubernatorial election
- 1942 Maryland gubernatorial election
- 1942 Massachusetts gubernatorial election
- 1942 Michigan gubernatorial election
- 1942 Minnesota gubernatorial election
- 1942 Nebraska gubernatorial election
- 1942 Nevada gubernatorial election
- 1942 New Hampshire gubernatorial election
- 1942 New Mexico gubernatorial election
- 1942 New York gubernatorial election
- 1942 North Dakota gubernatorial election
- 1942 Ohio gubernatorial election
- 1942 Oklahoma gubernatorial election
- 1942 Oregon gubernatorial election
- 1942 Pennsylvania gubernatorial election
- 1942 Rhode Island gubernatorial election
- 1942 South Carolina gubernatorial election
- 1942 South Dakota gubernatorial election
- 1942 Tennessee gubernatorial election
- 1942 Texas gubernatorial election
- 1942 United States gubernatorial elections
- 1942 Vermont gubernatorial election
- 1942 Wisconsin gubernatorial election

==== United States House of Representatives ====
- 1942 United States House of Representatives elections
- 1942 United States House of Representatives elections in California
- 1942 United States House of Representatives elections in South Carolina

==== United States Senate ====
- 1942 United States Senate elections
- 1942 United States Senate election in Alabama
- 1942 United States Senate election in Arkansas
- 1942 United States Senate election in Colorado
- 1942 United States Senate special election in Colorado
- 1942 United States Senate election in Georgia
- 1942 United States Senate election in Idaho
- 1942 United States Senate election in Illinois
- 1942 United States Senate election in Iowa
- 1942 United States Senate election in Kansas
- 1942 United States Senate election in Kentucky
- 1942 United States Senate election in Maine
- 1942 United States Senate election in Massachusetts
- 1942 United States Senate election in Michigan
- 1942 United States Senate election in Minnesota
- 1942 United States Senate special election in Minnesota
- 1942 United States Senate election in Mississippi
- 1942 United States Senate election in Montana
- 1942 United States Senate election in Nebraska
- 1942 United States Senate election in New Hampshire
- 1942 United States Senate election in New Jersey
- 1942 United States Senate election in Oklahoma
- 1942 United States Senate election in South Carolina
- 1942 United States Senate election in South Dakota
- 1942 United States Senate election in Tennessee
- 1942 United States Senate election in Texas
- 1942 United States Senate election in Virginia
- 1942 United States Senate election in Wyoming

==== United States mayoral elections ====
- 1942 Evansville mayoral election
- 1942 Sioux Falls mayoral special election

== South America ==
- 1942 Argentine legislative election
- 1942 Bolivian legislative election
- 1942 Chilean presidential election
- 1942 Colombian presidential election
- 1942 Uruguayan general election
- 1942 Uruguayan constitutional referendum

== See also ==
- Category:1942 elections
