= 1942 United States gubernatorial elections =

- November 3, 1942; September 14, 1942 (ME)

33 governorships
	Majority party	Minority party
Party	Democratic	Republican
Seats before	28	20
Seats after	24	23
Seat change	▼4	▲3
Seats up	18	15
Seats won	14	18
	Third party
Party	Progressive
Seats before	0
Seats after	1
Seat change	▲1
Seats up	0
Seats won	1
- Democratic hold Democratic gain Republican hold Republican gain Progressive gain No election

United States gubernatorial elections were held in 1942, in 33 states, concurrent with the House and Senate elections, on November 3, 1942. Elections took place on September 14 in Maine.

In Georgia, the governor was elected to a 4-year term for the first time, instead of a 2-year term.

== Race summary ==
State	Governor	Party	First elected	Status	Candidates
Alabama	Frank M. Dixon	Democratic	1938	Incumbent term-limited. Democratic hold.	▌ ✓ Chauncey Sparks (Democratic) 89.0%; ▌ Hugh McEniry (Republican) 10.5%; ▌Ordway Southard (Communist) 0.5%
Arizona	Sidney Preston Osborn	Democratic	1940	Incumbent re-elected.	▌ ✓ Sidney Preston Osborn (Democratic) 72.5%; ▌Jerrie W. Lee (Republican) 26.9%; ▌Charles R. Osburn (Prohibition) 0.6%
Arkansas	Homer Martin Adkins	Democratic	1940	Incumbent re-elected.	Primary election: ▌ ✓ Homer Martin Adkins (Democratic) 71.8%; ▌ Fred Keller (Democratic) 26.3%; ▌ Bill Neill (Democratic) 1.0%; ▌ Vernon Heath (Democratic) 0.91%; General election: ▌ ✓ Homer Martin Adkins (Democratic) 100.0%
California	Culbert Olson	Democratic	1938	Incumbent lost re-election. Republican gain.	▌ ✓ Earl Warren (Republican) 57.1%; ▌ Culbert Olson (Democratic) 41.8%; ▌ Nathan T. Porter (Townsend Party) 0.7%; ▌Fred Dyster (Prohibition) 0.5%
Colorado	Ralph Lawrence Carr	Republican	1938	Incumbent retired. Republican hold.	▌ ✓ John Charles Vivian (Republican) 56.2%; ▌Homer F. Bedford (Democratic) 43.4%; ▌William R. Dietrich (Communist) 0.4%
Connecticut	Robert A. Hurley	Democratic	1940	Incumbent lost re-election. Republican gain.	▌ ✓ Raymond E. Baldwin (Republican) 49.0%; ▌ Robert A. Hurley (Democratic) 44.4%; ▌Jasper McLevy (Socialist) 6.0%; ▌Joseph C. Borden Jr. (Socialist Labor) 0.7%
Georgia	Eugene Talmadge	Democratic	1932; 1936 (term-limited); 1940	Incumbent lost renomination. Democratic hold.	Primary election: ▌ ✓ Ellis Arnall (Democratic) 57.65%; ▌ Eugene Talmadge (Democratic) 42.35%; General election: ▌ ✓ Ellis Arnall (Democratic) 96.3%
Idaho	Chase A. Clark	Democratic	1940	Incumbent lost re-election. Republican gain.	▌ ✓ C. A. Bottolfsen (Republican) 50.15%; ▌Chase A. Clark (Democratic) 49.85%
Iowa	George A. Wilson	Republican	1938	Incumbent retired. Republican hold.	▌ ✓ Bourke B. Hickenlooper (Republican) 62.8%; ▌ Nelson G. Kraschel (Democratic) 37.0%; ▌Ward Hall (Prohibition) 0.2%; ▌F. M. Briggs (Independent) 0.1%
Kansas	Payne Ratner	Republican	1938	Incumbent retired. Republican hold.	▌ ✓ Andrew Frank Schoeppel (Republican) 56.7%; ▌ William H. Burke (Democratic) 41.8%; ▌ David C. White (Prohibition) 1.3%; ▌Ida A. Beloof (Socialist) 0.3%
Maine	Sumner Sewall	Republican	1940	Incumbent re-elected.	▌ ✓ Sumner Sewall (Republican) 66.8%; ▌ George W. Lane Jr. (Democratic) 33.2%
Maryland	Herbert O'Conor	Democratic	1938	Incumbent re-elected.	▌ ✓ Herbert O'Conor (Democratic) 52.6%; ▌ Theodore McKeldin (Republican) 47.5%
Massachusetts	Leverett Saltonstall	Republican	1938	Incumbent re-elected.	▌ ✓ Leverett Saltonstall (Republican) 54.1%; ▌ Roger Putnam (Democratic) 45.0%; ▌Otis Archer Hood (Communist) 0.3%; ▌Joseph S. Massidda (Socialist) 0.2%; ▌Henning A. Blomen (Socialist Labor) 0.2%; ▌Guy S. Williams (Prohibition) 0.1%
Michigan	Murray Van Wagoner	Democratic	1940	Incumbent lost re-election. Republican gain.	▌ ✓ Harry Kelly (Republican) 52.6%; ▌ Murray Van Wagoner (Democratic) 46.7%; ▌Frederic S. Goodrich (Prohibition) 0.7%
Minnesota	Harold Stassen	Republican	1938	Incumbent re-elected.	▌ ✓ Harold Stassen (Republican) 51.6%; ▌ Hjalmar Petersen (Farmer-Labor) 37.8%; ▌ John D. Sullivan (Democratic) 9.5%; ▌Martin Mackie (Communist) 0.6%; ▌Harris A. Brandborg (Industrial Government) 0.5%
Nebraska	Dwight Griswold	Republican	1940	Incumbent re-elected.	▌ ✓ Dwight Griswold (Republican) 74.8%; ▌ Charles W. Bryan (Democratic) 25.2%
Nevada	Edward P. Carville	Democratic	1938	Incumbent re-elected.	▌ ✓ Edward P. Carville (Democratic) 60.3%; ▌ Aaron V. Tallman (Republican) 39.8%
New Hampshire	Robert O. Blood	Republican	1940	Incumbent re-elected.	▌ ✓ Robert O. Blood (Republican) 52.2%; ▌ William J. Neal (Democratic) 47.8%
New Mexico	John E. Miles	Democratic	1938	Incumbent term-limited. Democratic hold.	▌ ✓ John J. Dempsey (Democratic) 54.6%; ▌ Joseph F. Tondre (Republican) 45.5%
New York	Herbert H. Lehman	Democratic	1932	Incumbent retired. Republican gain.	▌ ✓ Thomas E. Dewey (Republican) 52.1%; ▌ John J. Bennett Jr. (Democratic) 36.4%; ▌ Dean Alfange (American Labor) 9.8%; ▌ Israel Amter (Communist) 1.1%; ▌ Coleman B. Cheney (Socialist) 0.5%; ▌ Aaron M. Orange (Industrial Government) 0.1%
North Dakota	John Moses	Democratic	1938	Incumbent re-elected.	▌ ✓ John Moses (Democratic) 57.6%; ▌ Oscar W. Hagen (Republican) 42.4%
Ohio	John W. Bricker	Republican	1938	Incumbent re-elected.	▌ ✓ John W. Bricker (Republican) 60.5%; ▌ John McSweeney (Democratic) 39.5%
Oklahoma	Leon C. Phillips	Democratic	1938	Incumbent term-limited. Democratic hold.	▌ ✓ Robert S. Kerr (Democratic) 51.9%; ▌ William Otjen (Republican) 47.6%; ▌ Edward W. Fickinger (Prohibition) 0.5%
Oregon	Charles A. Sprague	Republican	1938	Incumbent lost renomination. Republican hold.	▌ ✓ Earl Snell (Republican) 77.9%; ▌ Lew Wallace (Democratic) 22.1%
Pennsylvania	Arthur James	Republican	1938	Incumbent term-limited. Republican hold.	▌ ✓ Edward Martin (Republican) 53.7%; ▌ F. Clair Ross (Democratic) 45.1%; ▌ Dale H. Learn (Prohibition) 0.7%; ▌ John J. Haluska (United Pension) 0.3%; ▌ Joseph Pirincin (Socialist Labor) 0.2%
Rhode Island	J. Howard McGrath	Democratic	1940	Incumbent re-elected.	▌ ✓ J. Howard McGrath (Democratic) 58.5%; ▌ James O. McManus (Republican) 41.5%
South Carolina	Richard Manning Jefferies	Democratic	1942 (Note: Jefferies became governor on March 2, 1942, after predecessor (J. Emile Harley) died.)	Incumbent retired. Democratic hold.	Primary election: ▌ ✓ Olin D. Johnston (Democratic) 51.8%; ▌ Wyndham Manning (Democratic) 48.2%; General election: ▌ ✓ Olin D. Johnston (Democratic) 100.0%
South Dakota	Harlan J. Bushfield	Republican	1938	Incumbent retired. Republican hold.	▌ ✓ Merrell Q. Sharpe (Republican) 61.5%; ▌ Lewis W. Bicknell (Democratic) 38.5%
Tennessee	Prentice Cooper	Democratic	1938	Incumbent re-elected.	▌ ✓ Prentice Cooper (Democratic) 70.1%; ▌ C. N. Frazier (Republican) 29.9%
Texas	Coke R. Stevenson	Democratic	1941 (Note: Stevenson became governor in 1941 after predecessor (W. Lee O'Daniel) resigned.)	Incumbent re-elected.	▌ ✓ Coke R. Stevenson (Democratic) 96.8%; ▌ C. K. McDowell (Republican) 3.2%
Vermont	William Henry Wills	Republican	1940	Incumbent re-elected.	▌ ✓ William Henry Wills (Republican) 77.9%; ▌ Park H. Pollard (Democratic) 22.1%
Wisconsin	Julius P. Heil	Republican	1938	Incumbent lost re-election. Progressive gain.	▌ ✓ Orland Steen Loomis (Progressive) 49.7%; ▌ Julius P. Heil (Republican) 36.5%; ▌William C. Sullivan (Democratic) 12.3%; ▌Frank P. Zeidler (Socialist) 1.4%; ▌Fred B. Blair (Independent) 0.1%; ▌Georgia Cozzini (Independent) 0.1%
Wyoming	Nels H. Smith	Republican	1938	Incumbent lost re-election. Democratic gain.	▌ ✓ Lester C. Hunt (Democratic) 51.3%; ▌ Nels H. Smith (Republican) 48.7%

== Closest races ==
States where the margin of victory was under 5%:

1. Idaho, 0.30%
2. Wyoming, 2.63%
3. Oklahoma, 4.25%
4. New Hampshire, 4.35%
5. Connecticut, 4.55%

States where the margin of victory was under 10%:

1. Maryland, 5.1%
2. Michigan, 5.9%
3. Pennsylvania, 8.6%
4. Massachusetts, 9.1%
5. New Mexico, 9.1%

Red denotes states won by Republicans. Blue denotes states won by Democrats.

== See also ==
- 1942 United States elections
  - 1942 United States Senate elections
  - 1942 United States House of Representatives elections
