= 1948 New Hampshire gubernatorial election =

- November 2, 1948
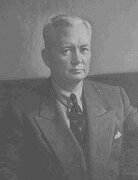

Nominee	Sherman Adams	Herbert W. Hill
Party	Republican	Democratic
Popular vote	116,212	105,207
Percentage	52.21%	47.27%
- Adams: 40-50% 50–60% 60–70% 70–80% 80–90% >90% Hill: 50–60% 60–70% 70–80% 80–90% Tie: 50%
Governor before election
Charles M. Dale
Republican
Elected Governor
Sherman Adams
Republican

The 1948 New Hampshire gubernatorial election was held on November 2, 1948. Republican nominee Sherman Adams defeated Democratic nominee Herbert W. Hill with 52.21% of the vote.

== Primary elections ==
Primary elections were held on September 14, 1948.

=== Republican primary ===
==== Candidates ====
- Sherman Adams, former U.S. Representative
- John R. McIntire

==== Results ====
Republican primary results
Party	Candidate	Votes	%
Republican	Sherman Adams	39,094	83.59
Republican	John R. McIntire	7,673	16.41
Total votes		46,767	100.00

== General election ==
=== Candidates ===
Major party candidates

- Sherman Adams, Republican
- Herbert W. Hill, Democratic

Other candidates

- Irma C. Otto, Progressive

=== Results ===
1948 New Hampshire gubernatorial election
Party	Candidate	Votes	%	±%
Republican	Sherman Adams	116,212	52.21%	
Democratic	Herbert W. Hill	105,207	47.27%	
Progressive	Irma C. Otto	1,152	0.52%	
Majority		11,005		
Turnout		222,571		
Republican hold		Swing		
