= Mary Dondero =

American politician (1894–1960)

Mayor of Portsmouth, New Hampshire
- In office 1945–1947
- Preceded by: Charles M. Dale
- Succeeded by: Cecil M. Neal

Personal details
- Born: Mary Ellen Carey; March 16, 1894 Portsmouth, New Hampshire, U.S.
- Died: March 24, 1960 (aged 66) Portsmouth, New Hampshire, U.S.
- Political party: Democratic
- Spouse: Charles Dondero (m. 1913; died 1944)
- Children: 4, including Eileen Foley

Mary Ellen Carey Dondero (March 16, 1894 – March 24, 1960) was an American politician who was the mayor of Portsmouth, New Hampshire, from 1945 to 1947. She was the state's first woman mayor.

== Early life ==
Dondero was the second of eight children born to Dennis and Nora (Leary) Carey, natives of Portsmouth who were the children of Irish immigrants. Her father died in an accident at Portsmouth Naval Shipyard when she was four months old, and her mother took up took in laundry to support the family. She dropped out of school during eighth grade to work for her mother. Nora Carey eventually remarried and had six children with her second husband, John Wade of Nova Scotia.

On July 4, 1913, Mary Ellen Carey married Charles Anthony Dondero. They had four daughters, and the family lived above her father-in-law's business – Dondero's Fruit and Ice Cream. During World War I, she was active in the Red Cross and in Liberty Loan drives. She won the 1918 Miss Portsmouth pageant and was later crowned Miss American Legion. Charles Dondero died in February 1944.

== Politics ==
Dondero's political involvement began during the 1928 presidential election, when she served as vice president of a Smith Club. She was a member of the New Hampshire House of Representatives from 1935 to 1938 and again from 1941 to 1946. She helped pass a 48-hour labor law and led the effort to allow women to serve on juries.

Dondero was elected to the Portsmouth city council in 1940. She was the Democratic nominee for mayor in 1942, but lost to Republican Charles M. Dale by 82 votes. She ran again in 1944, and on election day her opponent Ira A. Brown was declared the winner by eight votes. She petitioned for a recount, which found that she had won by a margin of seven votes. She was sworn into office on January 1, 1945. As mayor, she instituted a biweekly open house where citizens were allowed to stop by her office and discuss their problems. She was reelected in 1945 by the largest plurality in the city's history.

In 1947, Dondero lost her bid for reelection to Cecil M. Neal by 15 votes. In the same election, a referendum to adopt a city manager form of government was held and appeared to be defeated until Dondero challenged the results. Although she did not support the city manager government, she felt that there had been tampering, and a recount showed that the city manager plan had been narrowly adopted. Dondero was elected to the new city council. She returned to the New Hampshire House of Representatives in 1949 and served continuously until her death, except for a brief stint as acting postmaster of Portsmouth. She also served as a delegate to the 1948 and 1956 New Hampshire state constitutional conventions and was a delegate to the 1948 Democratic National Convention. She was vice chairman of the New Hampshire Democratic Committee until 1959, when she was removed over her support of Republican governor Wesley Powell's government reorganization plan. Seeking full-time work, she started a nursing home in Stratham, New Hampshire, with her two half-sisters. In 1953, one of her sisters, Anne Sadler, served alongside her in the New Hampshire House. Dondero later purchased a nursing home in Portsmouth after The Portsmouth Herald alleged she had violated residency requirements by spending much of her time in Stratham.

Dondero suffered a cerebral hemorrhage on November 23, 1959. She was still hospitalized when she suffered a second cerebral hemorrhage in March 1960. She died the following week at the age of 66. One of her daughters, Eileen Foley, followed her mother into politics and served as Portsmouth's mayor from 1968 to 1971, 1984 to 1985, and 1988 to 1997.

== See also ==
- List of mayors of Portsmouth, New Hampshire
