= 1944 New Hampshire gubernatorial election =

- November 7, 1944
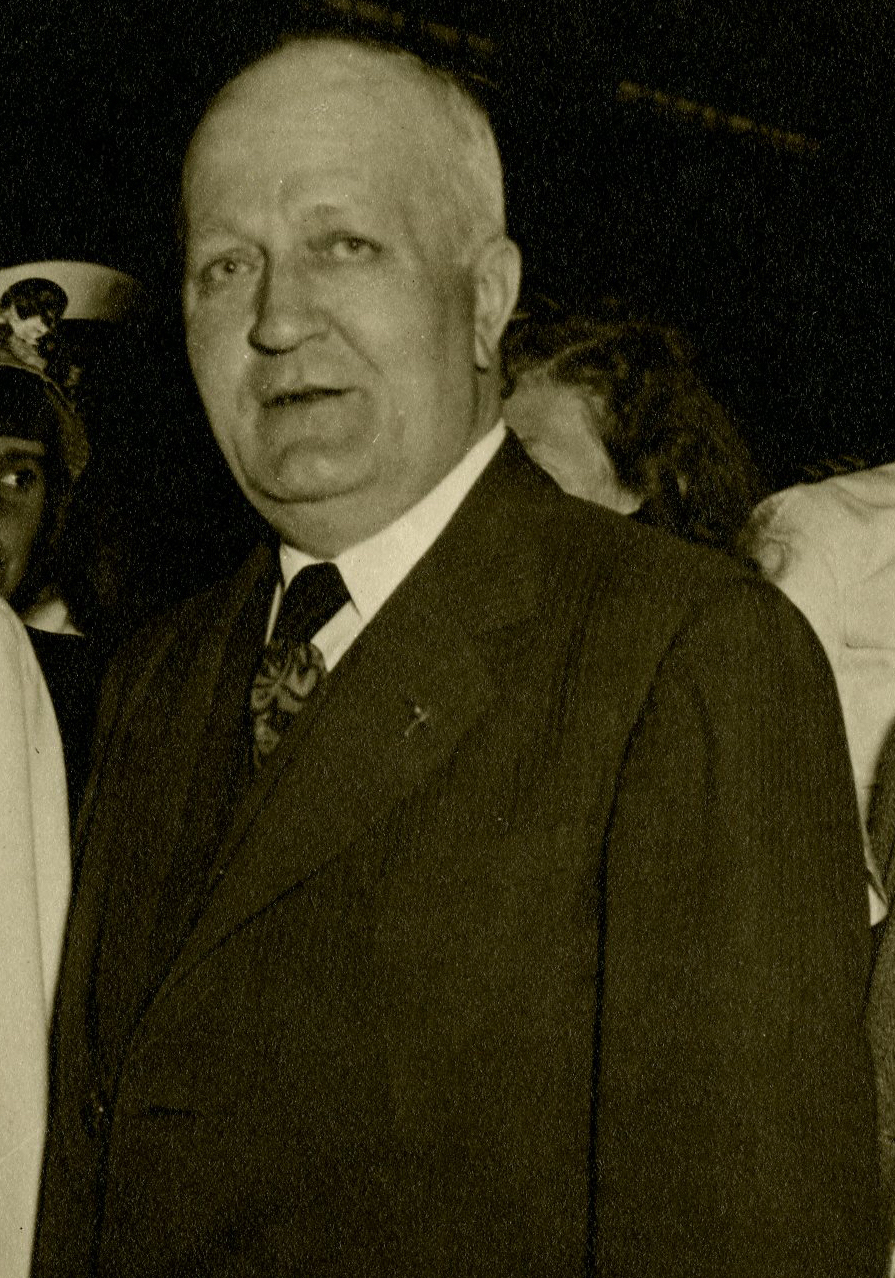

Nominee	Charles M. Dale	James J. Powers
Party	Republican	Democratic
Popular vote	115,799	102,232
Percentage	53.11%	46.89%
- Dale: 50–60% 60–70% 70–80% 80–90% >90% Powers: 50–60% 60–70% 70–80% 80–90% Tie: 50%
Governor before election
Robert O. Blood
Republican
Elected Governor
Charles M. Dale
Republican

The 1944 New Hampshire gubernatorial election was held on November 7, 1944. Republican nominee Charles M. Dale defeated Democratic nominee James J. Powers with 53.11% of the vote.

== Primary elections ==
Primary elections were held on July 11, 1944.

=== Republican primary ===
==== Candidates ====
- Charles M. Dale, Mayor of Portsmouth
- Robert O. Blood, incumbent Governor

==== Results ====
Republican primary results
Party	Candidate	Votes	%
Republican	Charles M. Dale	29,190	59.01
Republican	Robert O. Blood (incumbent)	20,275	40.99
Total votes		49,465	100.00

== General election ==
=== Candidates ===
- Charles M. Dale, Republican
- James J. Powers, Democratic

=== Results ===
1944 New Hampshire gubernatorial election
Party	Candidate	Votes	%	±%
Republican	Charles M. Dale	115,799	53.11%	
Democratic	James J. Powers	102,232	46.89%	
Majority		13,567		
Turnout		218,031		
Republican hold		Swing		
