= 1946 New Hampshire gubernatorial election =

- November 5, 1946
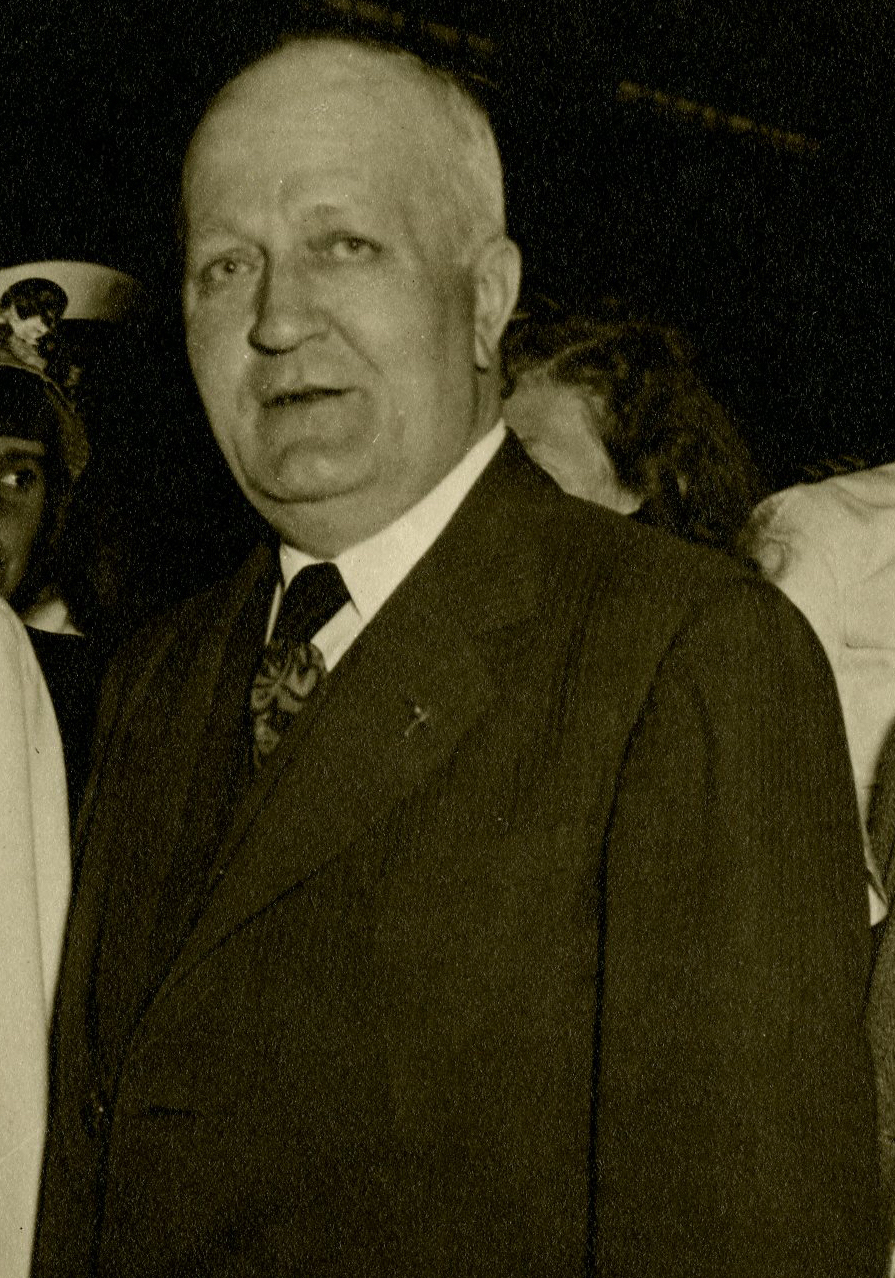

Nominee	Charles M. Dale	F. Clyde Keefe
Party	Republican	Democratic
Popular vote	103,204	60,247
Percentage	63.14%	36.86%
- Dale: 50–60% 60–70% 70–80% 80–90% >90% Keefe: 50–60% 60–70% 70–80%
Governor before election
Charles M. Dale
Republican
Elected Governor
Charles M. Dale
Republican

The 1946 New Hampshire gubernatorial election was held on November 5, 1946. Incumbent Republican Charles M. Dale defeated Democratic nominee F. Clyde Keefe with 63.14% of the vote.

== Primary elections ==
Primary elections were held on August 6, 1946.

=== Republican primary ===
==== Candidates ====
- Charles M. Dale, incumbent Governor
- Sherman Adams, U.S. Representative
- Elmer E. Bussey

==== Results ====
Republican primary results
Party	Candidate	Votes	%
Republican	Charles M. Dale (incumbent)	22,917	49.79
Republican	Sherman Adams	22,732	49.39
Republican	Elmer E. Bussey	375	0.82
Total votes		46,024	100.00

== General election ==
=== Candidates ===
- Charles M. Dale, Republican
- F. Clyde Keefe, Democratic

=== Results ===
1946 New Hampshire gubernatorial election
Party	Candidate	Votes	%	±%
Republican	Charles M. Dale (incumbent)	103,204	63.14%	
Democratic	F. Clyde Keefe	60,247	36.86%	
Majority		42,957		
Turnout		163,451		
Republican hold		Swing		
