= John R. Reding =

American politician

John Randall Reding (October 18, 1805 – October 8, 1892) was an American politician who served as a U.S. representative from New Hampshire.

== Early life ==
Born in Portsmouth, New Hampshire, Reding attended public schools. He apprenticed as a printer and editor under Isaac Hill in Concord at the influential New Hampshire Patriot, and later married one of Hill's sisters. He began the Democratic Republican paper in Haverhill, New Hampshire, on July 23, 1828, using printing equipment purchased from the just closed Haverhill Intelligencer, edited by Sylvester T. Goss.

== Career ==
Reding was elected as a Democrat to the 27th and 28th United States Congress. After leaving congress, he served as naval storekeeper at Portsmouth from 1853 to 1858, and as mayor of Portsmouth in 1860. He was later a member of the New Hampshire House of Representatives from 1867 to 1870.

== Death ==
Reding died in Portsmouth on October 8, 1892, and was interred in Haverhill Cemetery in Haverhill, New Hampshire.

== See also ==
- List of mayors of Portsmouth, New Hampshire

U.S. House of Representatives
Preceded by Jared W. Williams	Member of the U.S. House of Representatives from New Hampshire's at-large congressional district 1841-1845	Succeeded by James H. Johnson
