= Eileen Foley =

American politician

Mayor of Portsmouth, New Hampshire
- In office 1988–1997
- Preceded by: Mary Keenan
- Succeeded by: Evelyn Sirrell

Mayor of Portsmouth, New Hampshire
- In office 1984–1985
- Succeeded by: Mary Keenan

Mayor of Portsmouth, New Hampshire
- In office 1968–1971
- Preceded by: Timothy "Ted" Connors

Personal details
- Born: Helen Dondero; February 27, 1918 Portsmouth, New Hampshire, U.S.
- Died: February 22, 2016 (aged 97)
- Party: Democratic Party
- Spouse: John J. Foley (1948–1994; his death)
- Children: 3
- Education: Syracuse University

Helen "Eileen" Foley (née Dondero; February 27, 1918 – February 22, 2016) was an American politician. Foley served as the Mayor of Portsmouth, New Hampshire, eight terms from 1968–1971, 1984–1985, and 1988–1997. She remains the longest-serving mayor in the city's history. She represented the 24th District in the New Hampshire Senate for seven terms, including one term as the Democratic Party Minority Leader.

Foley followed her mother, Mary Dondero, the first woman to become mayor of Portsmouth (1945–47), into politics.

Portraits of Foley and her mother now hang side-by-side in Portsmouth City Hall. Portsmouth's city council chambers have also been renamed in Foley's honor.

== Biography ==
=== Early life ===
Foley was born Helen "Eileen" Dondero on February 27, 1918, in Portsmouth, New Hampshire. She was one of four daughters of Charles and Mary (Carey) Dondero. Her father, was the first male baby of Italian descent to be born in Portsmouth. Her mother was of Irish descent. Her paternal grandparents, who had emigrated from Italy in 1883, owned and operated the Dondero's Fruit and Vegetable Store on Congress Street in Portsmouth. Eileen Foley and her sisters were raised in an apartment above the family's produce store.

On August 17, 1923, Foley, who was five years old at the time, cut the silk ribbon at the dedication ceremony for the Memorial Bridge, which connects Portsmouth with neighboring Kittery, Maine, over the Piscataqua River. The Newsreel Company captured her ribbon cutting on film. She then rode across the new bridge with New Hampshire Governor Fred H. Brown and Maine Governor Percival Proctor Baxter as thousands waited to cross the span, which had cost two million dollars to construct.

Following the outbreak of World War II, Foley worked at the Portsmouth Naval Shipyard as a painter's helper to aid the war effort. However, she soon enlisted in the Women's Army Corps (WAC). Foley was stationed at Grenier Air Force Base in Manchester, New Hampshire, and the former Bolling Air Force Base in Washington, D.C., during her enlistment in WAC.

She returned to Portsmouth after the war and became the Chair of the Democratic City Committee by 1945. She and U.S. President Harry Truman held a 30-minute, sit-down meeting, also in 1945, as part of her duties as the city Democratic chair.

She earned a bachelor's degree from Syracuse University.

In 1948, she married John J. Foley, a shipyard worker and veteran of World War II in 1948. John Foley had spent two years as a German prisoner of war. He had returned to Portsmouth after the war and became a draftsman at the Portsmouth Naval Shipyard. Eileen Foley, who had become Portsmouth city clerk in 1946, signed her own marriage license as part of her official duties. The couple had three children, Mary Carey, Jay and Barry. The couple remained married for 44 years, until his death in 1994.

=== Career ===
Foley followed her mother into politics. Mary Carey Dondero, who had never completed 8th grade, nevertheless became the first woman elected to the Portsmouth City Council by 1940. In 1945, she became not only the first woman elected mayor of Portsmouth, but also the first female mayor of any U.S. city east of the Mississippi River. She served as mayor from 1945 to 1947.

Upon her mother's death in 1960, Foley focused much of her professional energy into politics and public service. Foley later wrote of her mother, "I lived with a lady who was a political person for 24 hours every day, and who loved every minute of it."

Mary Carey Dondero had held office as the city's first female mayor from 1945 to 1947, at a time when there were very few elected women officials in the United States.

Eileen Foley enjoyed an extensive political career in local and state politics. She served as the mayor of Portsmouth for eight terms (equaling 16 years) from 1968 to 1971, 1984 to 1985, and 1988 to 1997. She remains the longest-serving mayor in the city's history. Under Mayor Foley, the city experienced the economic impact of the closure of Pease Air Force Base in 1991 and the transition of the city's North End through urban renewal. Foley strongly opposed any attempts to close the Portsmouth Naval Shipyard, one of the major employers of city residents. She presided over the city's transition to a cultural and tourist destination, but lamented the loss of the character of some of its older neighborhoods, including Little Italy, Christian Shore, Atlantic Heights, Puddle Dock, and the city's South End to gentrification and new development.

From 1984 until 2005, Portsmouth was governed by consecutive women female mayors under Foley and her colleagues: Foley from 1984 to 1985; Mary Keenan from 1986 to 1987; Foley from 1988 to 1997; and Evelyn Sirrell from 1998 to 2005. Foley was also a member of the Portsmouth School District's school board for twelve years.

Foley acted as an ambassador for Portsmouth both during and after her mayoral tenures. She led official visits to several of Portsmouth's sister cities in Japan and Northern Ireland, as well as the friendship city of Portsmouth, England. In 1985, Mayor Foley received a 30-member official delegation from Nichinan, Japan, as the two cities prepared to become "sister cities".

Mayor Foley headed a 21-member group from Portsmouth to Nichinan in 1986 to complete the agreement. The sister city agreement between Portsmouth and Nichinan by the Treaty of Portsmouth to end the Russo-Japanese War, a 1905 agreement which was signed at the Portsmouth Naval Yard. She also headed an official visit to Carrickfergus, Northern Ireland. The idea for the Carrickfergus-Portsmouth came from John Paul Jones' naval battles during the American Revolutionary War. Finally, Foley spearheaded a sister city agreement with Portsmouth, England, noting that the original colonial Province of New Hampshire had been established by Captain John Mason.

Foley was a former member of the Prescott Park Arts Festival's board of directors, which was in financial distress by the 1980s. She and her colleagues have been credited with restoring the festival's financial health.

Foley was elected to the New Hampshire Senate for seven terms from the 24th District. Her tenure included one term as the Democratic Minority Leader of the Senate. She declined to seek re-election in 1978 and retired from the Senate. James R. Splaine, who had previously served with Foley on city council for four terms, was elected to succeed her in the 24th District Senate seat.

During the 1990s, Foley published her memoir, The Pleasure Is All Mine. In the book, she is pictured while campaigning with numerous presidential hopefuls from both parties, including George H. W. Bush, Bill Clinton, Hillary Clinton, Al Gore, Hubert Humphrey, Jesse Jackson, John McCain, and Ed Muskie. Foley pursued other professional interests in addition to politics. She was one of just 13 people to complete flight attendant training for the short-lived Pan American Airways in 1999 at the Portsmouth International Airport at Pease.

The original Memorial Bridge, which Foley had helped dedicate in 1923, was permanently closed on July 27, 2011, due to disrepair and serious safety hazards. Foley tied a blue ribbon onto the bridge's plaque at its closing ceremony on October 1, 2011. A replacement was constructed. The new, $88 million replacement Memorial Bridge was officially opened during a ceremony on August 9, 2013. Foley, aged 95 years old at the time, cut the ribbon for the bridge's reopening, just as she had done for the original span in 1923.

Helen "Eileen" Foley died on February 22, 2016, at the age of 97, five days before her 98th birthday. Tributes for Foley came from New Hampshire's political community. Portsmouth's present mayor, Jack Blalock, called Foley "the best mayor Portsmouth ever had", while chairman of the New Hampshire Democratic Party Raymond Buckley called her "one of New Hampshire's greatest citizens and a beloved New Hampshire Democrat." U.S. Senator Jeanne Shaheen praised Foley's accomplishments, saying in a statement,

She was not only an incredible advocate for the Seacoast Region in New Hampshire, but also around the globe by helping to establish sister cities and international trade. So much of the local progress made in e-commerce, tourism and historic preservation, can be traced back to Eileen's leadership and foresight.

== See also ==
- List of mayors of Portsmouth, New Hampshire
