= Bernard Goldfine =

American businessman (died 1967)

- Born: 1880s/1890s Russian Empire
- Died: September 22, 1967; Boston, Massachusetts, U.S.
- Occupation: Businessman

Bernard Goldfine (1880s/1890s – September 22, 1967) was an American businessman. Starting his career after dropping out of high school to support his family, he owned and operated several mills and hotels throughout New England. A close associate with several governors and senators throughout New England, his relationship with Sherman Adams came to national attention when the latter stepped down as White House Chief of Staff after the House Subcommittee on Legislative Oversight discovered Adams had accepted luxury items from Goldfine.

== Biography ==
=== Early life and career ===
Goldfine was born in the Russian Empire; sources differ on his birth year (Note: Parmet says that he was born in 1889. The New York Times said in 1958 that he was born in 1889 or 1890, but at the time of his death that he was born in 1890 or 1891. Goldfine recalled that he was "born 67 years ago" during his 1958 congressional testimony, which would put his birth year in the latter range provided by The New York Times.) and birth place. (Note: The New York Times said that he was born in Kaunas, then part of the Kovno Governorate of the Russian Empire. However, Goldfine himself said in his congressional testimony that he was born "in a little town in Russia" called Avanta.) He was the son of Ida and Samuel Goldfine. In 1897, he and his Jewish family emigrated to the United States, settling in an East Boston tenement.

Goldfine was educated at Lyman Grammar School and Mechanic Arts High School, but dropped out after a year because he had to find work for the family after his brother died. After starting his first job delivering hats, he worked at a junkyard his father ran. He also worked in the East Boston area as a shoe shiner and paperboy.

Goldfine was married to Charlotte Goldblatt from 1917 until his death. They had four children.

=== Business career and political connections ===
Goldfine started his first business with a friend and $1,200 from his savings; known as the Strathmore Woolen Company, it dealt in textile remnants and profited when World War I created demands for military uniforms. Later, he operated several mills throughout New England, including in Northfield, Vermont, Lebanon, New Hampshire, and Warren, Maine. In September 1953, Goldfine bought the George Mabbett and Sons Company, a textile mill operator in Plymouth, Massachusetts. Around the time, The New York Times called him "a champion of New England as a textile center". By 1958, 1,372 employees were working at his mills.

In August 1946, Goldfine purchased the Little Building near the Boston Common. He bought several real estate companies, namely the East Boston Company and Boston Port Development Company. His businesses also included numerous textile sales agencies and hotels. In addition to Boston, he had offices in New York City and San Francisco. Some of his land holdings later became part of Logan International Airport. He also owned a farm in Enfield, New Hampshire (where he bought the Hotel Rogers in November 1943), as well as a summer home in Hull, Massachusetts.

Outside of business, Goldfine built relationships throughout New England's political sphere. Among his friends were Boston mayor James Michael Curley, Maine senator Frederick G. Payne, Massachusetts governor Foster Furcolo, New Hampshire governor Sherman Adams, and New Hampshire senators Styles Bridges and Norris Cotton. He had connections to lawyers from his experience in business law, with one associate even saying "He doesn't have a lawyer, he's got a bar association". He once hired a public relations firm for his business activities, including a 1951 Anti-Hard Times Conference in Vermont, where he also chartered several planes to fly the governors attending there.

Goldfine lived in a ten-room house in Chestnut Hill with a chauffeur, a Cadillac, and two domestic servants. Reportedly, The New York Times said that it was not "unusual ... to find two or three New England Governors attending dinner" at his house. He was known to give gifts to all sorts of people "from hotel bellhops to top political figures", and Seymour Linscott of The Boston Globe once said that he "strode through life distributing largesse like a latter-day Santa Claus". He also engaged in philanthropic work, with annual donations amounting to at least $50,000, as well as donations to Catholic archbishop of Boston Richard Cushing's child welfare program.

=== Relationship with Sherman Adams and subsequent legal troubles ===
As early as 1942, the Federal Trade Commission had filed complaints against Goldfine's companies for product mislabeling, particularly overstating their quality. At the time, Goldfine considered them to be at most "minor matters” not likely to get to his level". Adams, one of Bernard Goldfine's closest friends, had intervened in government complaints against Goldfine at least twice: in 1953, when Goldfine asked Adams (by then president Dwight D. Eisenhower's White House Chief of Staff) to relay the situation to FTC chair Edward F. Howrey under what Adams maintained at the time were "routine courtesies to help a friend in trouble with the federal bureaucracy", leading to the charges being dropped; and in 1955, when the Securities and Exchange Commission discovered that Goldfine's East Boston Company had not filed annual financial reports for years.

By 1958, the House Subcommittee on Legislative Oversight had placed Goldfine under investigation for his activities with Adams. The subcommittee discovered that Goldfine had sent Adams several luxury items, including a vicuña overcoat (made from Goldfine's Northfield mill), oriental rug, and hotel expenses. According to Adams, Goldfine once provided similar gifts to every state governor in the country. Due to the scandal, Adams was asked to step down as White House Chief of Staff. The New York Times called his relationship with Adams "a major Republican embarrassment in President Eisenhower's second term".

On August 13, 1958, the United States House of Representatives voted 369-8 to hold Goldfine in contempt of Congress for failing to respond to the committee's questions. On December 19, 1958, district court judge Charles Edward Wyzanski Jr. found Goldfine and his secretary Mildred Paperman guilty of contempt of court for withholding documents from an Internal Revenue Service case involving his businesses, and on December 22 he received a three month jail sentence and a $1,000 fine. The Supreme Court of the United States denied certiorari for his case on June 27, and a motion to reduce both his and Paperman's sentences was denied by Circuit Court Judge Peter Woodbury on June 30. He served his sentence at the Federal Correctional Institution, Danbury in 1960. He and Northfield Mills also received a $5,000 federal fine for violations of the Wool Products Labeling Act in June 1960.

In March 1960, Goldfine was indicted for evading $790,000 of income and corporate taxes. An IRS investigation also discovered more than $300,000 of unreported income on Goldfine's behalf. Although initially found unfit to stand trial in October 1960, this decision was later reversed in February 1961. On June 5, 1961, Goldfine was fined $110,000 and sentenced to a year and a day (in addition to a 18 months suspended sentence) for tax evasion. Following a stroke, he received an early release after serving six months of his sentence. He was later charged with probation violations involving letters smuggled to him in prison, but received no sentence. He was released from parole on June 5, 1962.

=== Later life and death ===
In February 1963, Goldfine (who was declared insolvent in court) settled with court to pay $10 million of unpaid federal taxes from him and his wife by selling off his personal and corporate assets. Francis J. Souhan, a New York state legislator, bought Goldfine's Northfield mill. With his Chestnut Hill home sold as part of the settlement, he moved to an apartment in Back Bay, Boston. Despite initially quietly retiring from business following the settlement, he still owned two businesses in Boston: Strathmore Sales on 115 Chauncy Street and a women's clothing store on 109 Newbury Street named the Heather Shop.

Goldfine died on September 22, 1967, in his Back Bay apartment, following treatment for heart disease. His funeral was held at Beth El Cemetery in West Roxbury on September 24, 1967, with Furcolo and Payne attending and Rabbi Manuel Saltzman of Congregation Kehillath Israel presiding.
