= 1950 New Hampshire gubernatorial election =

- November 7, 1950
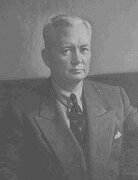

Nominee	Sherman Adams	Robert P. Bingham
Party	Republican	Democratic
Popular vote	108,907	82,258
Percentage	56.95%	43.01%
- Adams: 50–60% 60–70% 70–80% 80–90% >90% Bingham: 50–60% 60–70% 70–80% 80–90%
Governor before election
Sherman Adams
Republican
Elected Governor
Sherman Adams
Republican

The 1950 New Hampshire gubernatorial election was held on November 7, 1950. Incumbent Republican Sherman Adams defeated Democratic nominee Robert P. Bingham with 56.95% of the vote.

== General election ==
=== Candidates ===
- Sherman Adams, Republican
- Robert P. Bingham, Democratic

=== Results ===
1950 New Hampshire gubernatorial election
Party	Candidate	Votes	%	±%
Republican	Sherman Adams (incumbent)	108,907	56.95%	
Democratic	Robert P. Bingham	82,258	43.01%	
Majority		26,649		
Turnout		191,239		
Republican hold		Swing		
