= List of mayors of Portsmouth, New Hampshire =

Mayors of the city of Portsmouth, New Hampshire, USA

The following is a list of mayors of the city of Portsmouth, New Hampshire, USA.

- Abner Greenleaf, 1850
- John Laighton, 1851
- Christopher Toppan, 1852
- Horton D. Walker, 1853–1855, 1872
- Richard Jenness, 1856
- Robert Morrison, 1857-1859
- John Randall Reding, 1860
- William Simes, 1861
- Jonathan Dearborn, 1862–1863, 1867
- John Henry Bailey, 1864-1866
- Frank Jones, 1868-1869
- Joseph B. Adams, 1870-1871
- Thomas E.O. Marvin, 1873
- Frank W. Miller, 1874
- Moses H. Goodrich, 1874-1875
- John Henry Broughton, 1876-1877
- William Henry Sise, 1878-1881
- John S. Treat, 1882-1883
- Calvin Page, 1884, 1899
- Marcellus Eldredge, 1885-1886
- George Enos Hodgdon, 1887-1888
- Edmund S. Fay, 1889-1890
- John J. Laskey, 1891-1892
- Charles P. Berry, 1893-1894
- William Oliver Junkins, 1895-1896
- John Walter Emery, 1897
- John S. Tilton, 1898
- Edward Everett McIntire, 1900-1901
- John Pender, 1902
- George D. Marcy, 1903-1904
- William Edward Marvin, 1905-1906
- Wallace Hackett, 1907-1908
- Edward Haven Adams, 1909-1910
- Daniel Wesley Badger, 1911-1913
- Harry B. Yeaton, 1914-1915
- Samuel Tilden Ladd, 1916–1918, 1923
- Albert Hislop, 1919-1920
- Fernando Wood Hartford, 1921–1922, 1928-1932
- Orel Dexter, 1924-1925
- Charles M. Dale, 1926–1927, 1943-1944
- Sylvester F.A. Pickering, 1933
- Robert E. Marvin, 1934-1936
- Kennard E. Goldsmith, 1937-1940
- Stewart Everett Rowe, 1941-1942
- Mary Dondero, 1945-1947
- Cecil Maurice Neal, 1948-1949
- Richman Stanley Margeson, 1950-1951
- Theodore R. Butler, 1952-1955
- John J. Leary, 1955-1957
- Andrew Harry Jarvis, 1958-1959
- Robert Arthur Shaines, 1960-1961
- John J. Wholey, 1962–1963, 1978-1981
- Timothy “Ted” Connors, 1964-1967
- Eileen Foley, 1968–1971, 1984–1985, 1988-1997
- Arthur F. Brady Jr., 1972-1973
- Bruce Graves, 1974-1977
- Peter Weeks, 1982-1983
- Mary McEachern Keenan, 1986-1987
- Evelyn Sirrell, 1998-2005
- Steve Marchand, 2006-2007
- Tom Ferrini, 2008-2011
- Eric Spear, 2012-2013
- Bob Lister, 2014-2015
- Jack Blalock, 2016-2019
- Rick Becksted, 2020-2021
- Deaglan McEachern, 2022–present

== See also ==
- Portsmouth history
