= Memorial Bridge (Portsmouth, New Hampshire) =

Vertical-lift bridge across the Piscataqua River

World War I Memorial Bridge
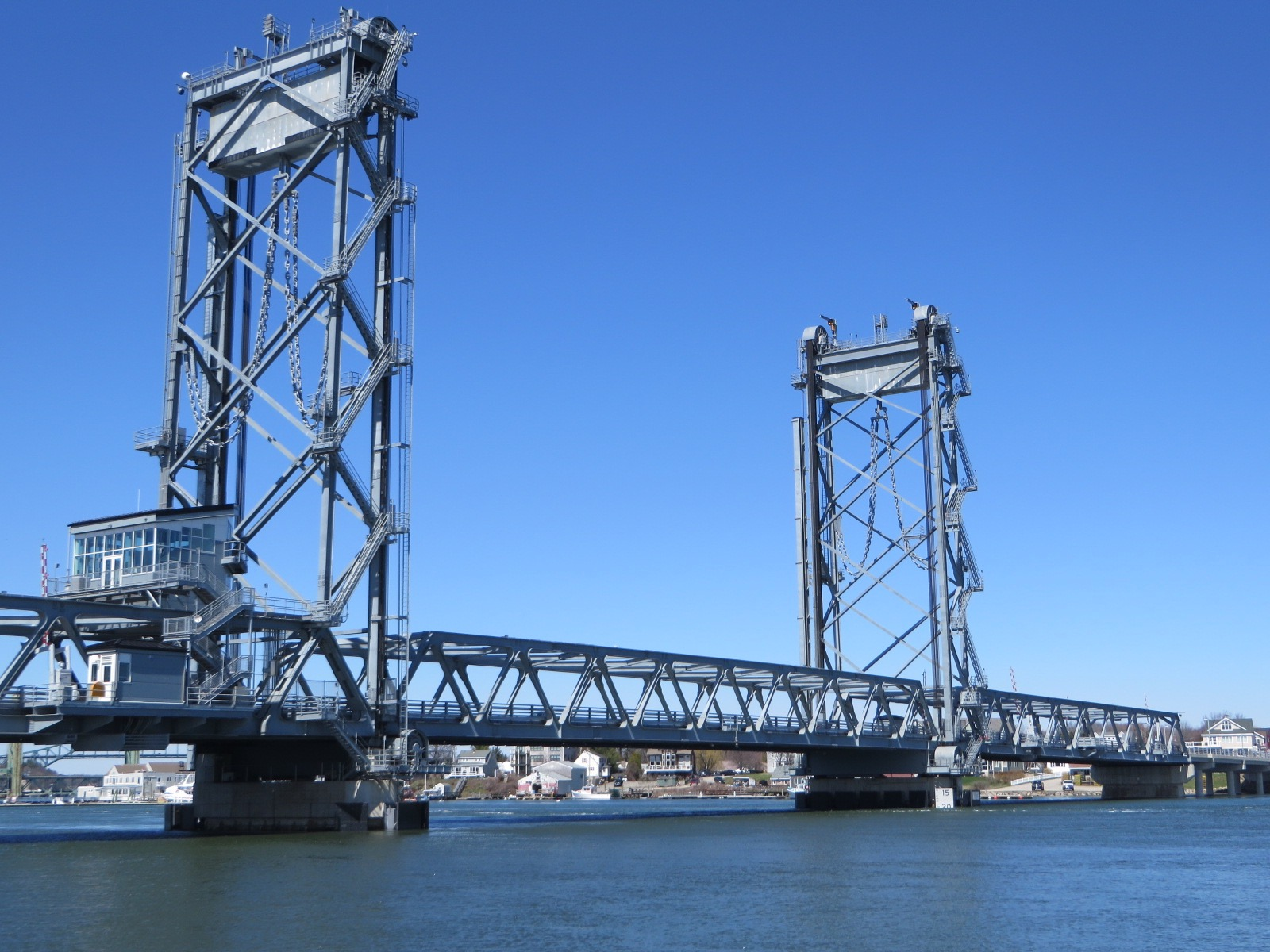
- The new Memorial Bridge
- Coordinates: 43.07938°N 70.75255°W
- Carries: US 1 USBR 1
- Crosses: Piscataqua River
- Locale: Portsmouth, NH and Kittery, ME
- ID number: 021702470008400

Characteristics
- Design: Vertical-lift bridge
- Total length: 366.1 m (1,201 ft)
- Width: 8.5 m (27.9 ft)
- Longest span: 91.5 m (300 ft)
- Clearance below: 39.6 m (129.9 ft) (Lift span open)

History
- Opened: August 8, 2013

Statistics
- Toll: None

Location
- Interactive map of World War I Memorial Bridge

The World War I Memorial Bridge is a vertical-lift bridge that carries U.S. Route 1 across the Piscataqua River between Portsmouth, New Hampshire, and Badger's Island in Kittery, Maine, United States. The current bridge was opened in 2013, replacing a bridge of similar design that existed from 1923 to 2012. A large overhead plaque carried over from the original reads "Memorial to the Sailors and Soldiers of New Hampshire who gave their lives in the World War 1917–1919."

The lift span can be fully opened to allow large commercial vessels to pass. During summer, the lift section remains partially elevated every half-hour between 7 a.m. and 7 p.m. This allows smaller commercial and recreational boat traffic. The bridge is currently the only one of the three Piscataqua River bridges with provisions for pedestrians. New Hampshire and Maine designated the bridge as part of their State Bicycle Routes, and the bridge is part of the proposed East Coast Greenway.

== History ==
=== Original bridge ===
Constructed between 1920 and 1923, the original Memorial Bridge was the first without toll to span the Piscataqua between Portsmouth and Kittery. The bridge was constructed as a joint venture between the states of Maine and New Hampshire and the federal government, and dedicated as a World War I memorial. The bridge opened in August 1923.

Because of the condition of the bridge, vehicles weighing more than 20 tons were prohibited. This restriction was lowered to 10 tons on July 10, 2009.

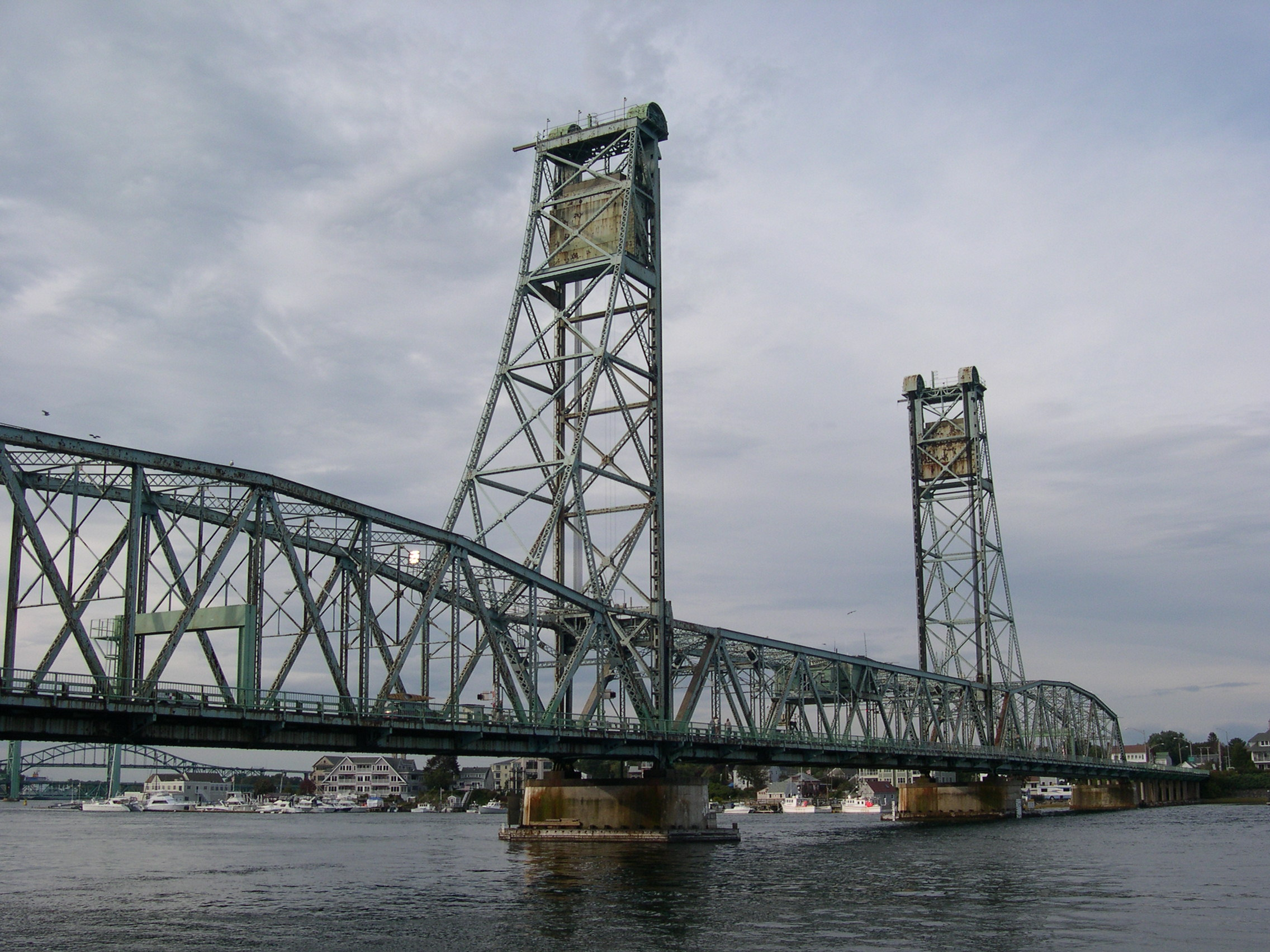
The original bridge, seen from Prescott Park in Portsmouth

A rehabilitation project for the bridge was planned for 2009, pending funding. The project was expected to last two years and cost more than $30 million. It was expected that the federal government would cover 80% of the cost. The rest would have been split between Maine and New Hampshire. The Memorial Bridge rehabilitation project was placed on hold in 2009 because the winning bid for the contract came in $15 million over the intended budget. This stalled rehabilitation project together with proposals to demolish and replace the bridge were factors in the inclusion of the bridge in the National Trust for Historic Preservation list of America's 11 Most Endangered Historic Places for 2009.

Originally, the road over the bridge was part of New England Interstate Route 1, also known as the Atlantic Highway. When the New England routes were superseded by the United States Numbered Highways in 1926 it was redesignated as US 1.

Emergency repairs caused a month long closure in October–November 2009, and a ten-day one in December 2010. Plans for replacement continued to move forward.

The bridges walkway was designated as US Bicycle Route 1 in May, 2011 as part the first major expansion of the United States Bicycle Route System since its creation in the 1980s.

On July 27, 2011, the Memorial Bridge was permanently closed. An inspection cited "too many problems in too many places." On January 3, 2012, the NHDOT announced that the bridge would be further closed to pedestrians and cyclists on January 9, 2012. The NHDOT operated an hourly shuttle bus between Portsmouth and Kittery until the new bridge was complete. The center span of the bridge was demolished on February 8, 2012.

=== Replacement bridge ===
On May 6, 2010, the Senate Transportation Committee of the New Hampshire legislature unanimously voted to include $44 million in bonds that, in addition to other state and federal funds, would allow the Memorial Bridge to be replaced without further funding from Maine, which is half-owner of the bridge. This plan was contingent on approval by the full legislature, an agreement with the State of Maine, and availability of federal stimulus funds. George Campbell, commissioner of the NHDOT, said at a Portsmouth City Council meeting in 2010 that the bridge was too far beyond repair for rehabilitation. Original bridge piers would be reused. The replacement would look similar to the original span. The bridge was designed by Theodore Zoli of HNTB and built by Archer Western Contractors.

The new bridge was officially dedicated at a ceremony on the New Hampshire side of the span just before noon on August 8, 2013. The bridge initially opened to only pedestrians and bicyclists. The new bridge—constructed over two still existing piers—opened to vehicular traffic at 2:00 p.m., first with southbound traffic (Maine to New Hampshire), and then northbound. Additional work on the new bridge was finished in November 2013.

On the night of February 25, 2022, the bridge was lit in the colors of the flag of Ukraine in a show of solidarity with the people of Ukraine during the 2022 Russian invasion of Ukraine.

In March 2025, the bridge was one of 68 identified by the National Transportation Safety Board (NTSB) as needing risk assessment with regards to a possible vessel strike.

=== Eileen Foley dedications ===
At the original bridge's dedication on August 17, 1923, five-year old Eileen Foley—known then by her birth name, Helen Dondero—cut the ceremonial silk ribbon to officially open it to traffic. Foley later served as mayor of Portsmouth for eight terms (1968–1971, 1984–1985 and 1988–1997). Foley tied a blue ribbon onto the bridge's plaque for the closing ceremony on October 1, 2011. On August 8, 2013, she returned to dedicate the replacement bridge, 90 years after the opening of the original bridge. She died in February 2016.

== Gallery ==
=== Original bridge ===
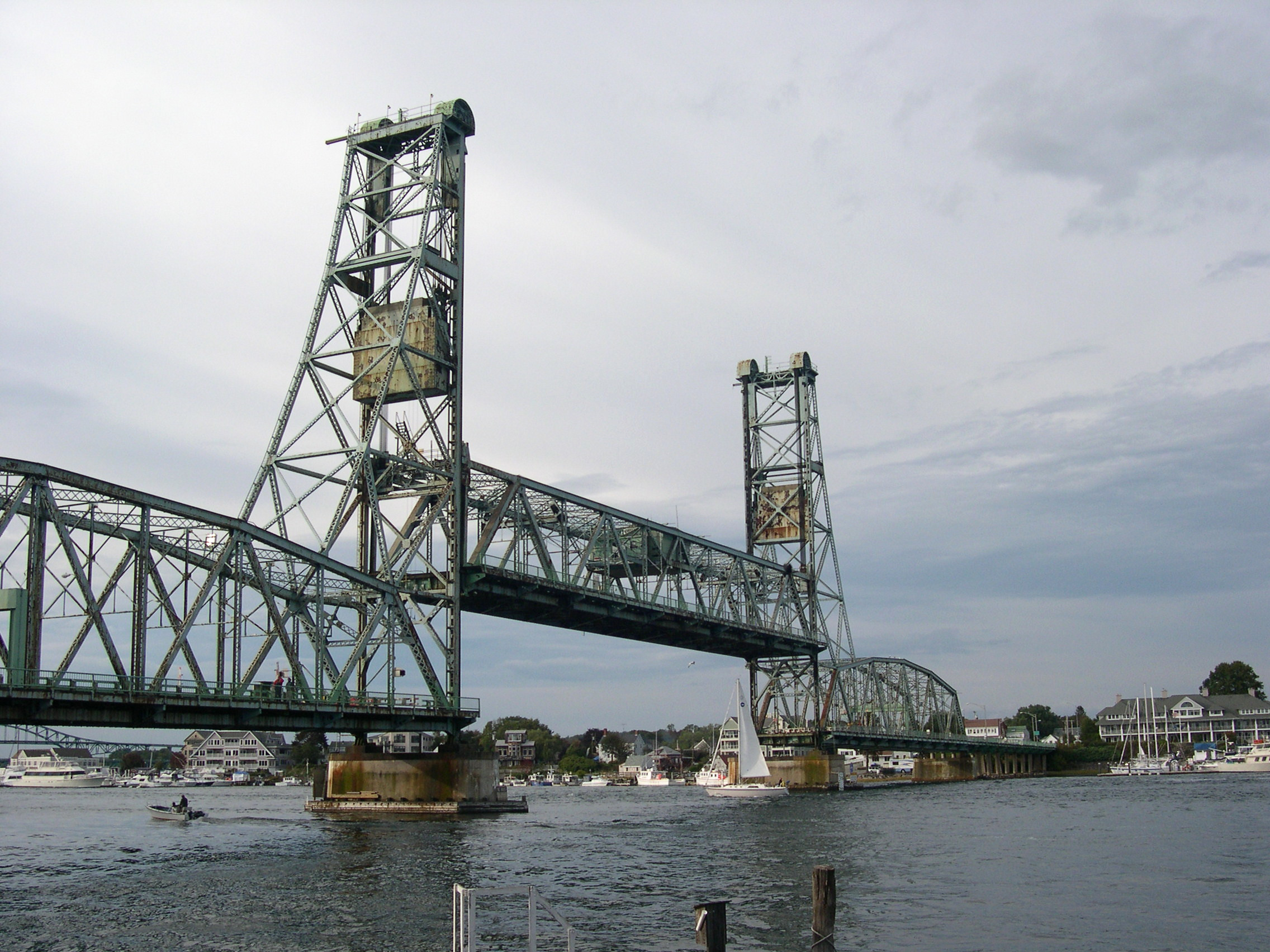
A sailboat passes beneath the open lift span

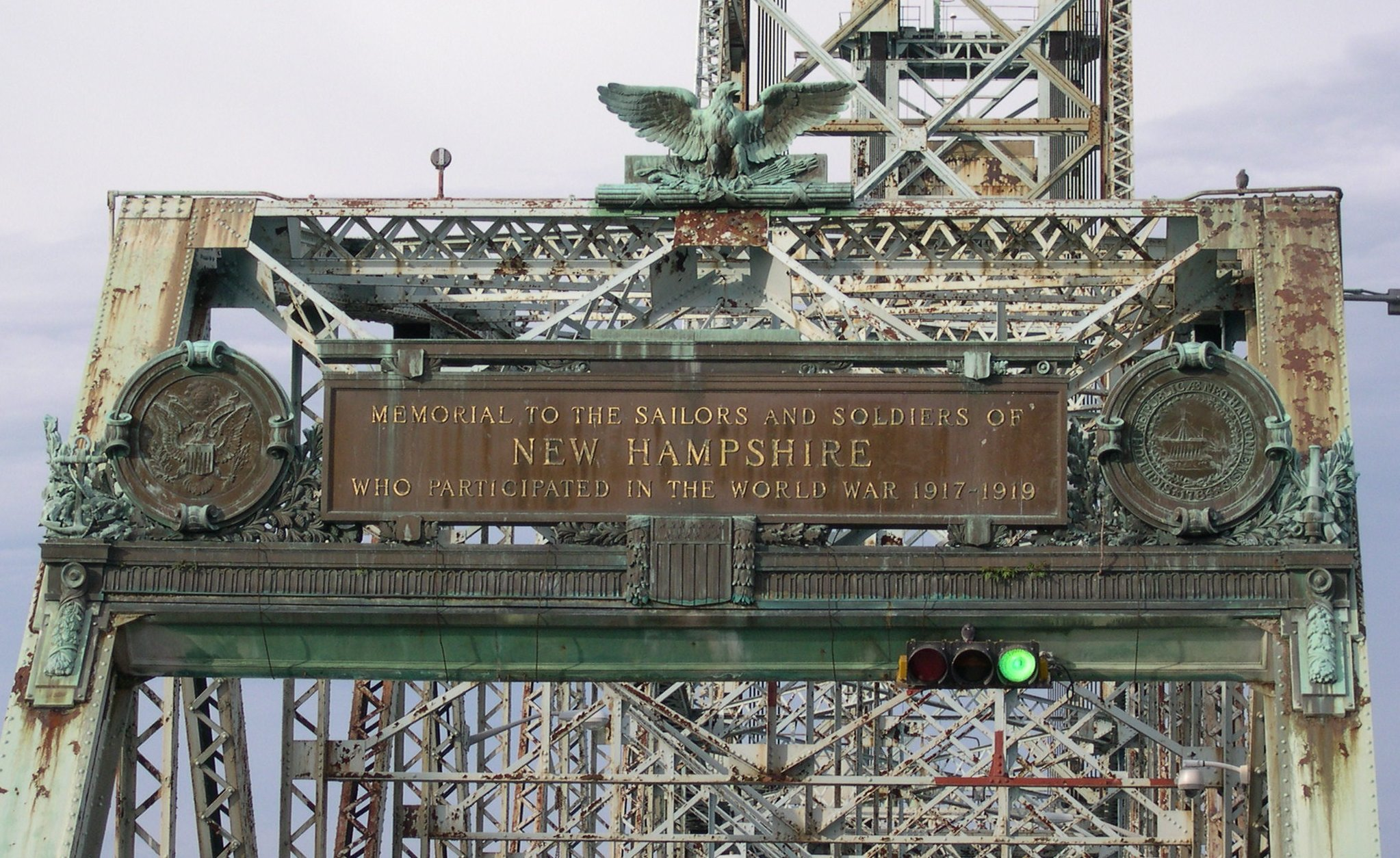
Memorial dedication plaque over the Portsmouth entrance

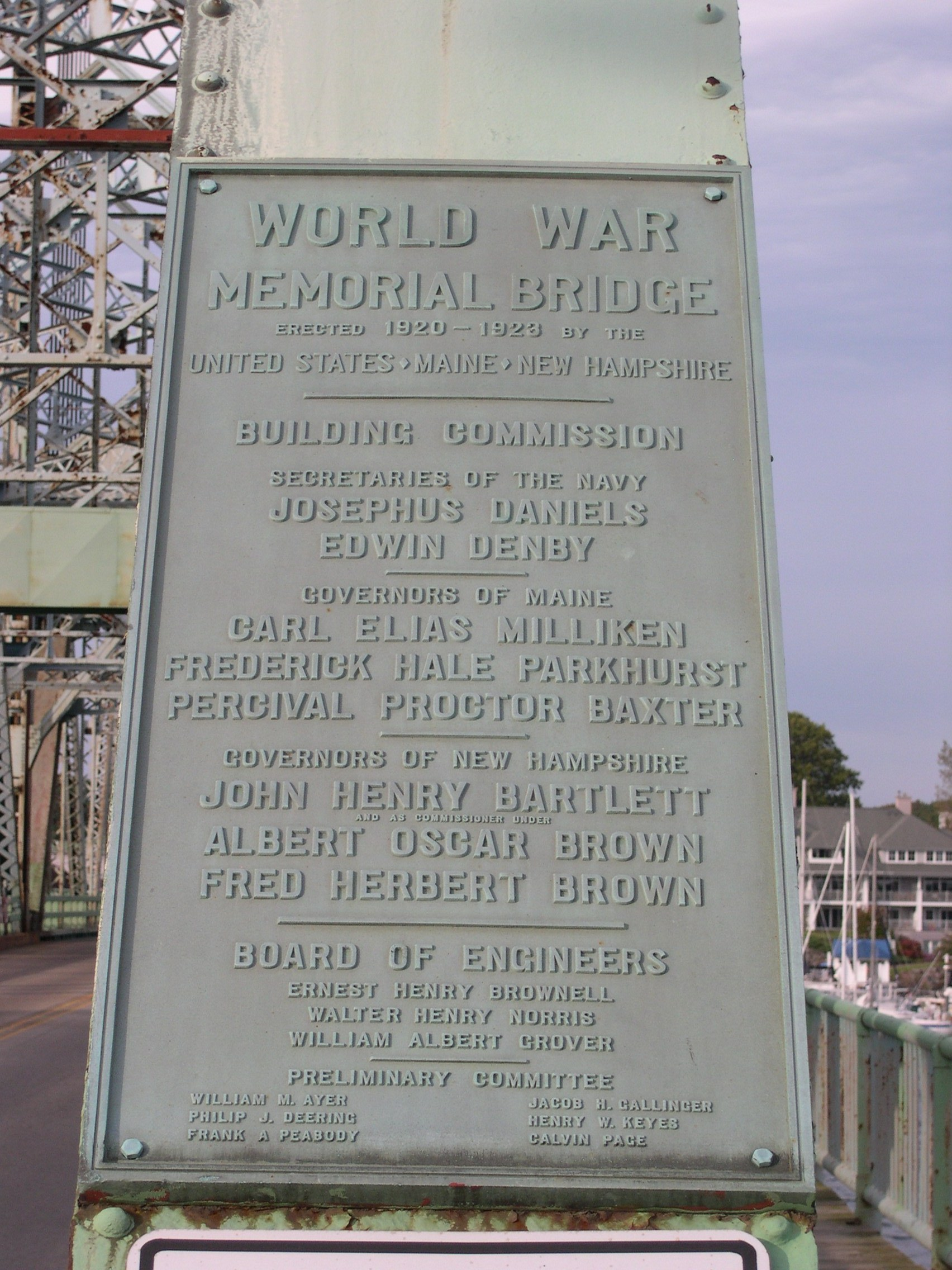
Plaque naming the bridge's building commission

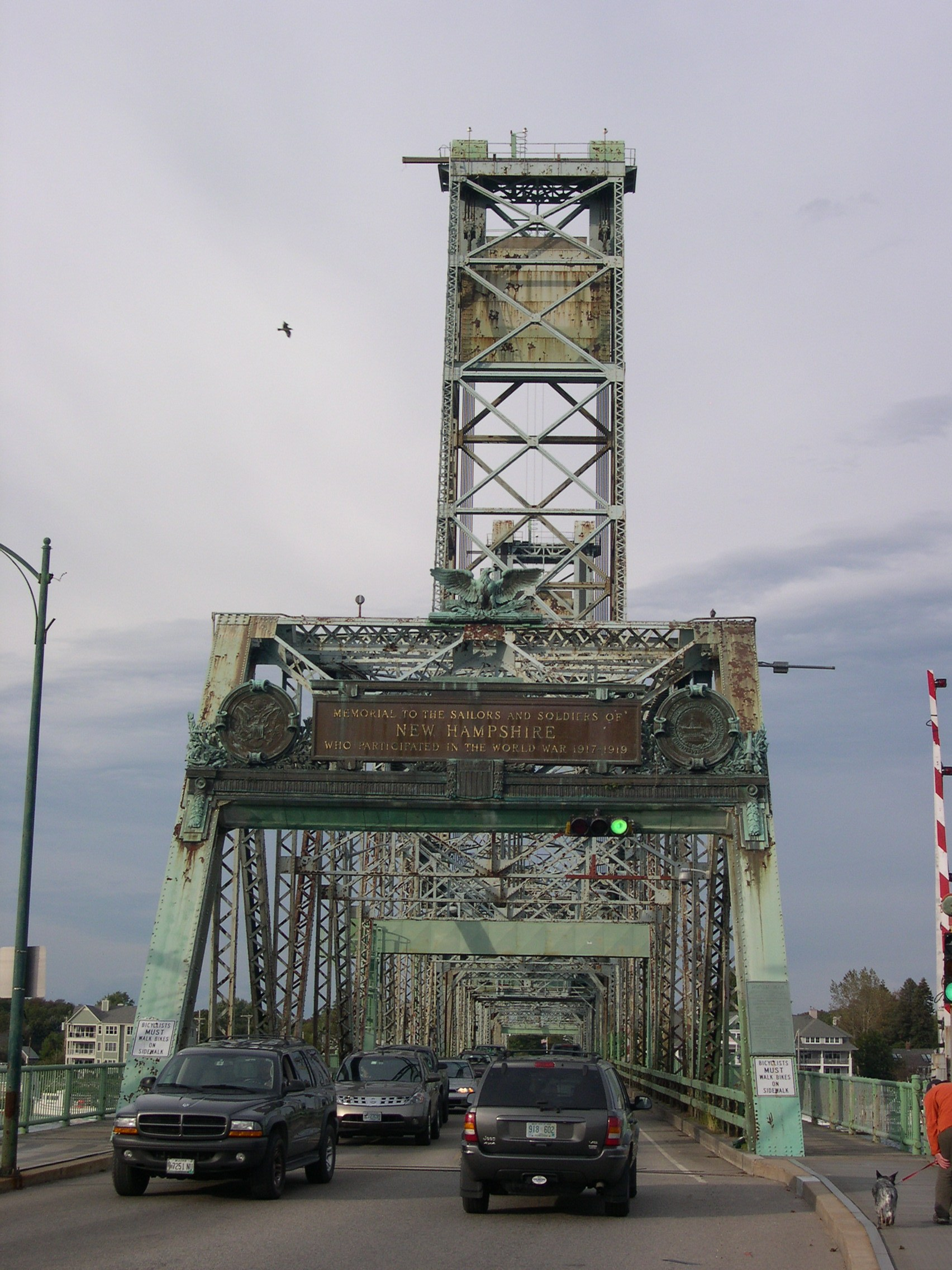
The Portsmouth end of the bridge

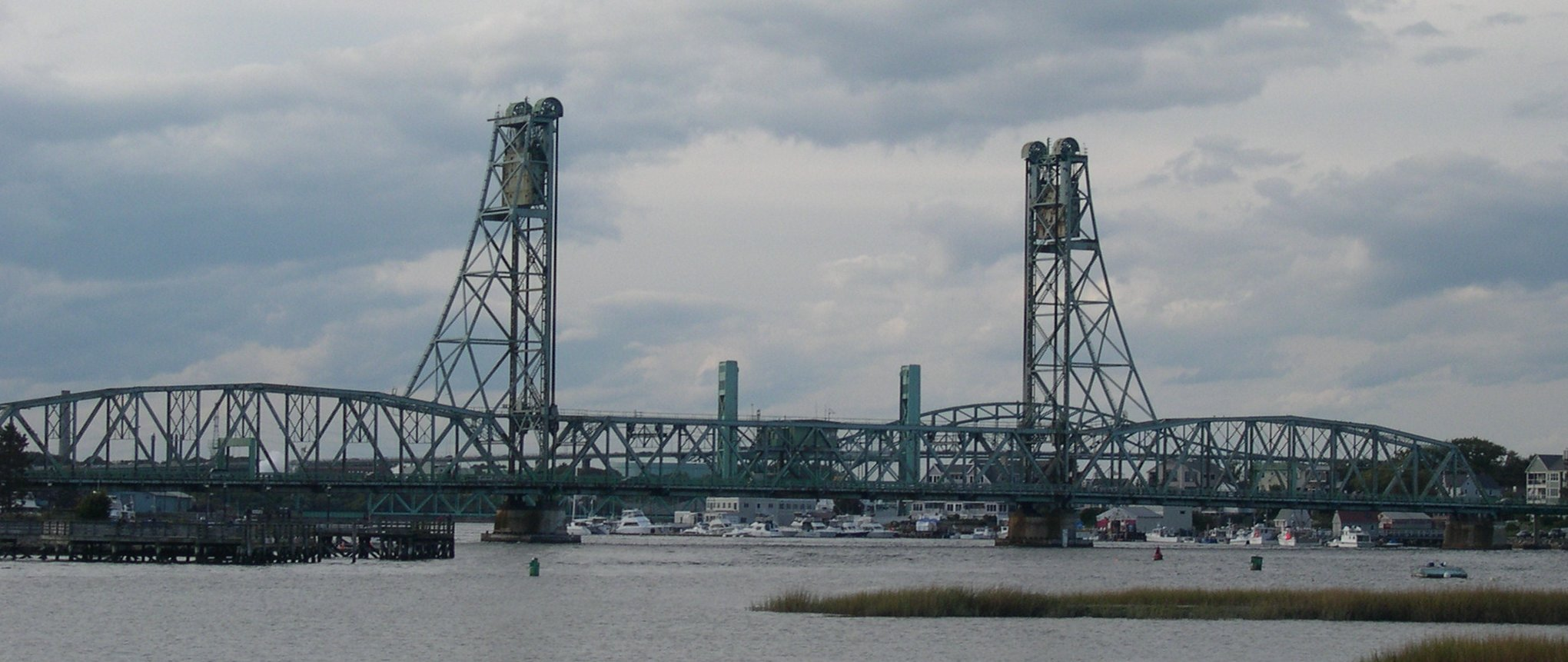
The three spans from Portsmouth to Kittery: Memorial Bridge, Sarah Mildred Long Bridge and Piscataqua River Bridge

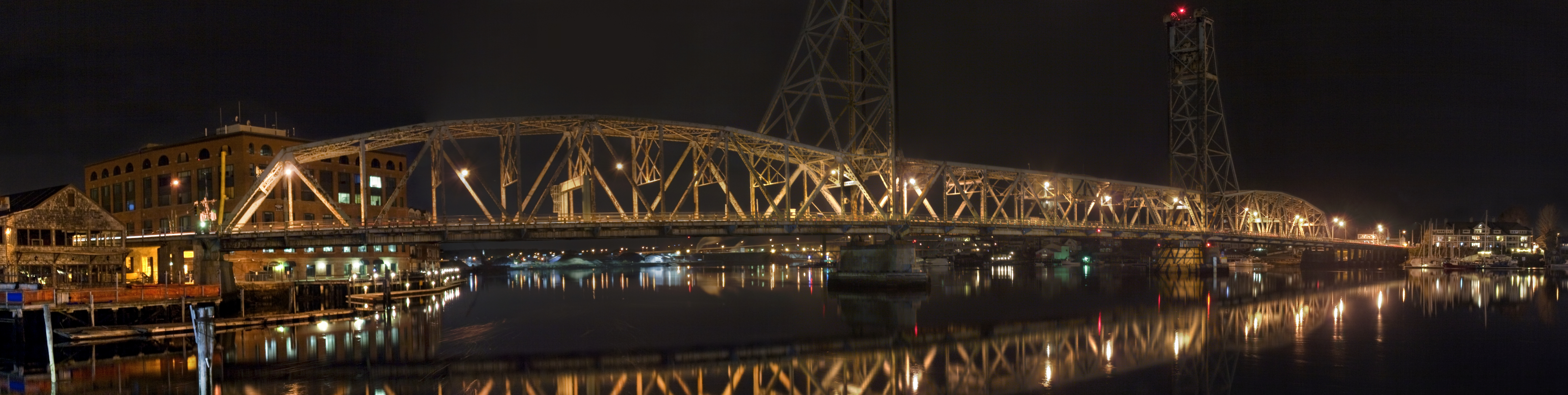
Panoramic of Memorial Bridge at night, as seen from Prescott Park pier

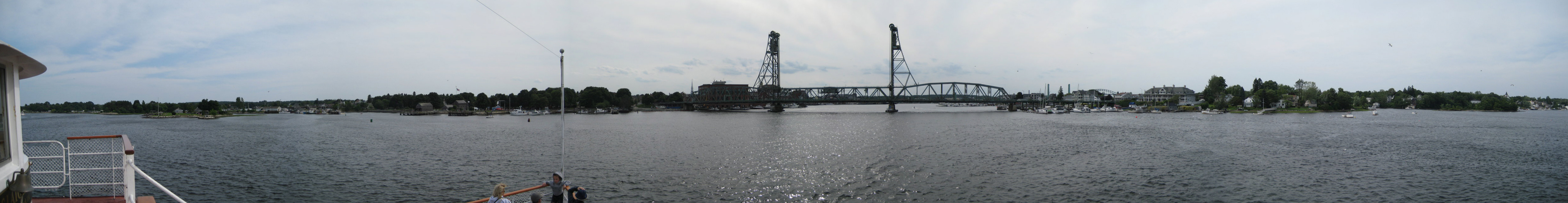
A 270-degree view of the bridge from the Piscataqua River

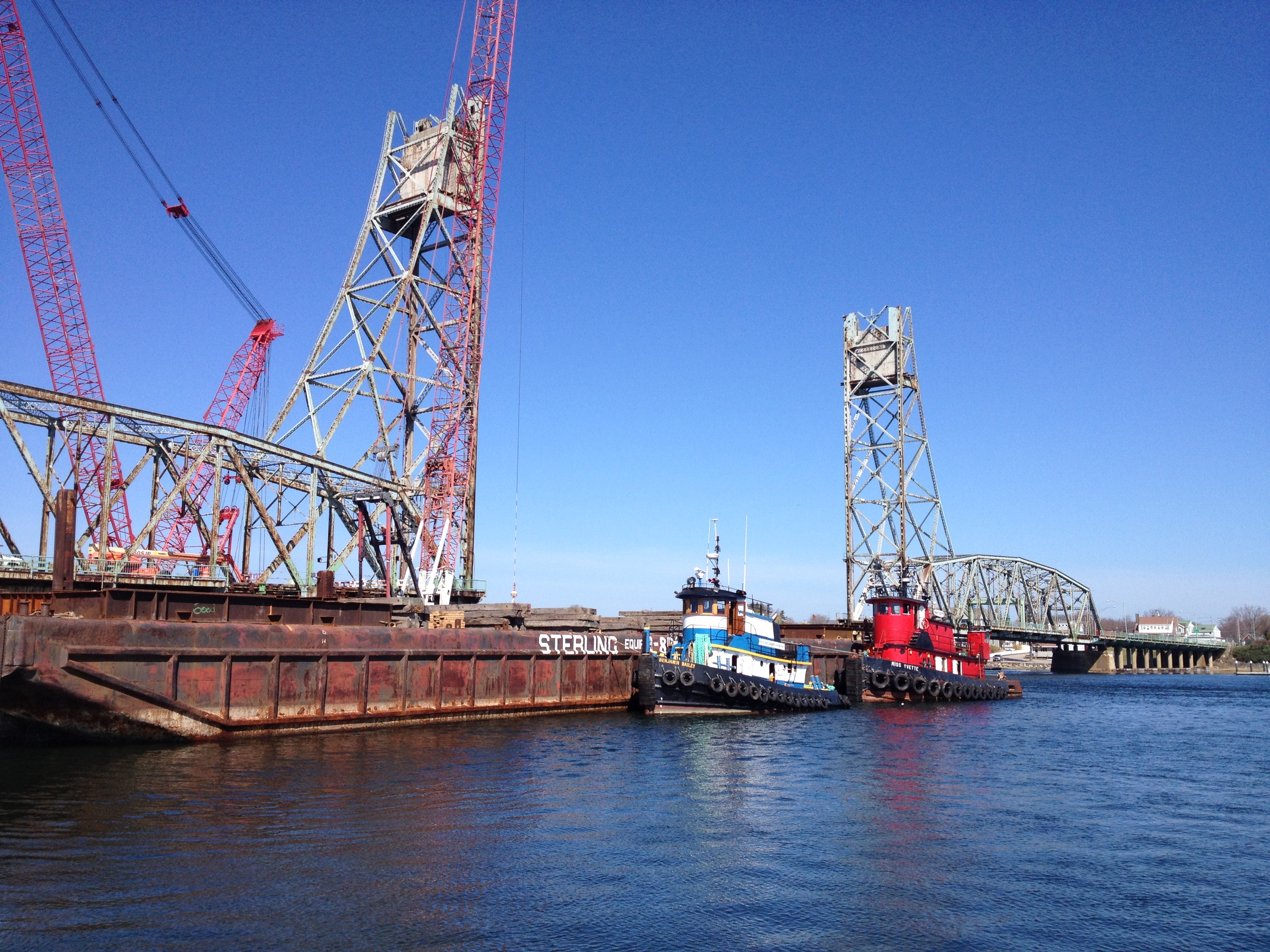
The bridge being deconstructed in March 2012

=== Replacement bridge ===
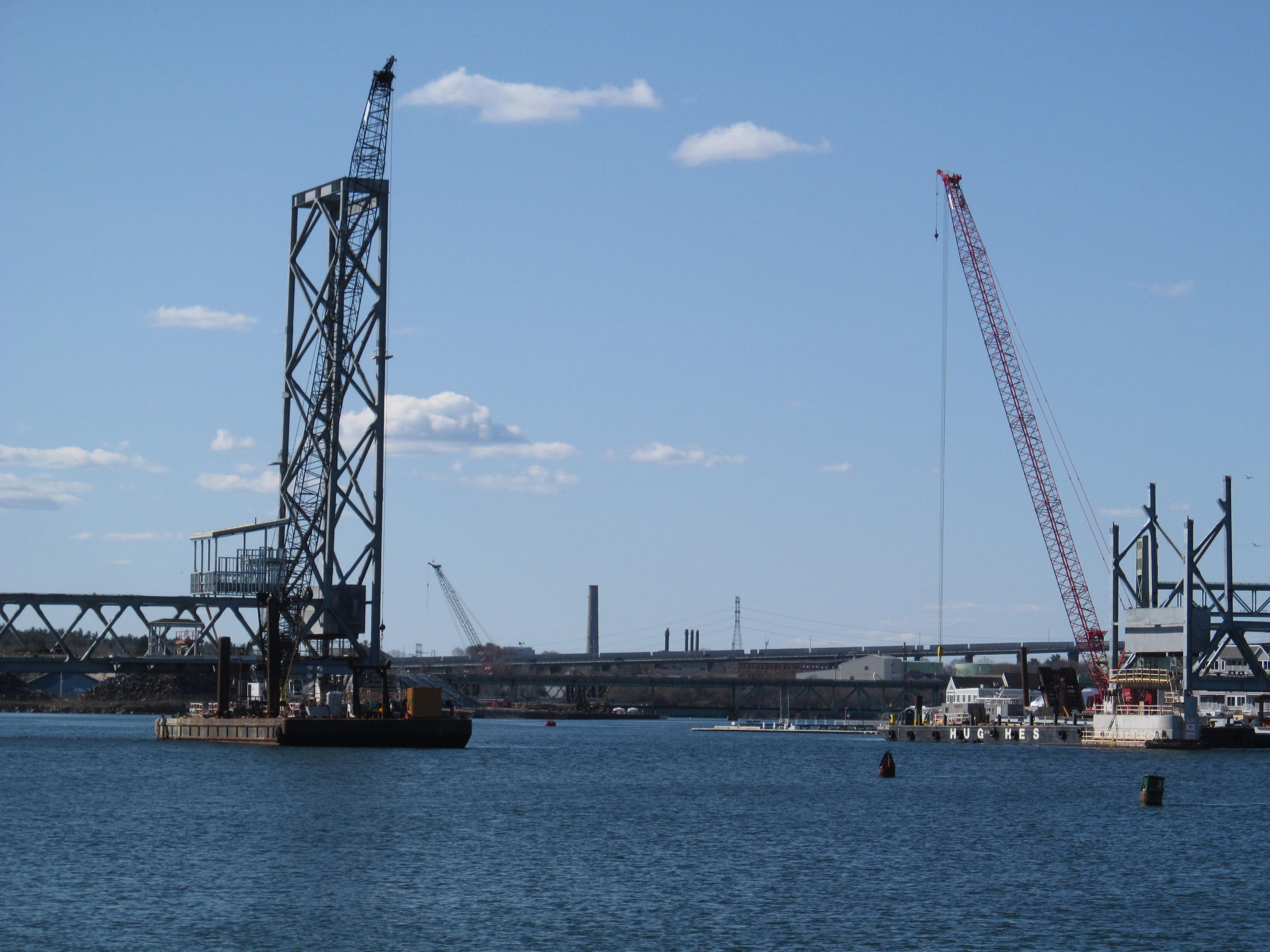
Bridge under construction in late March 2013

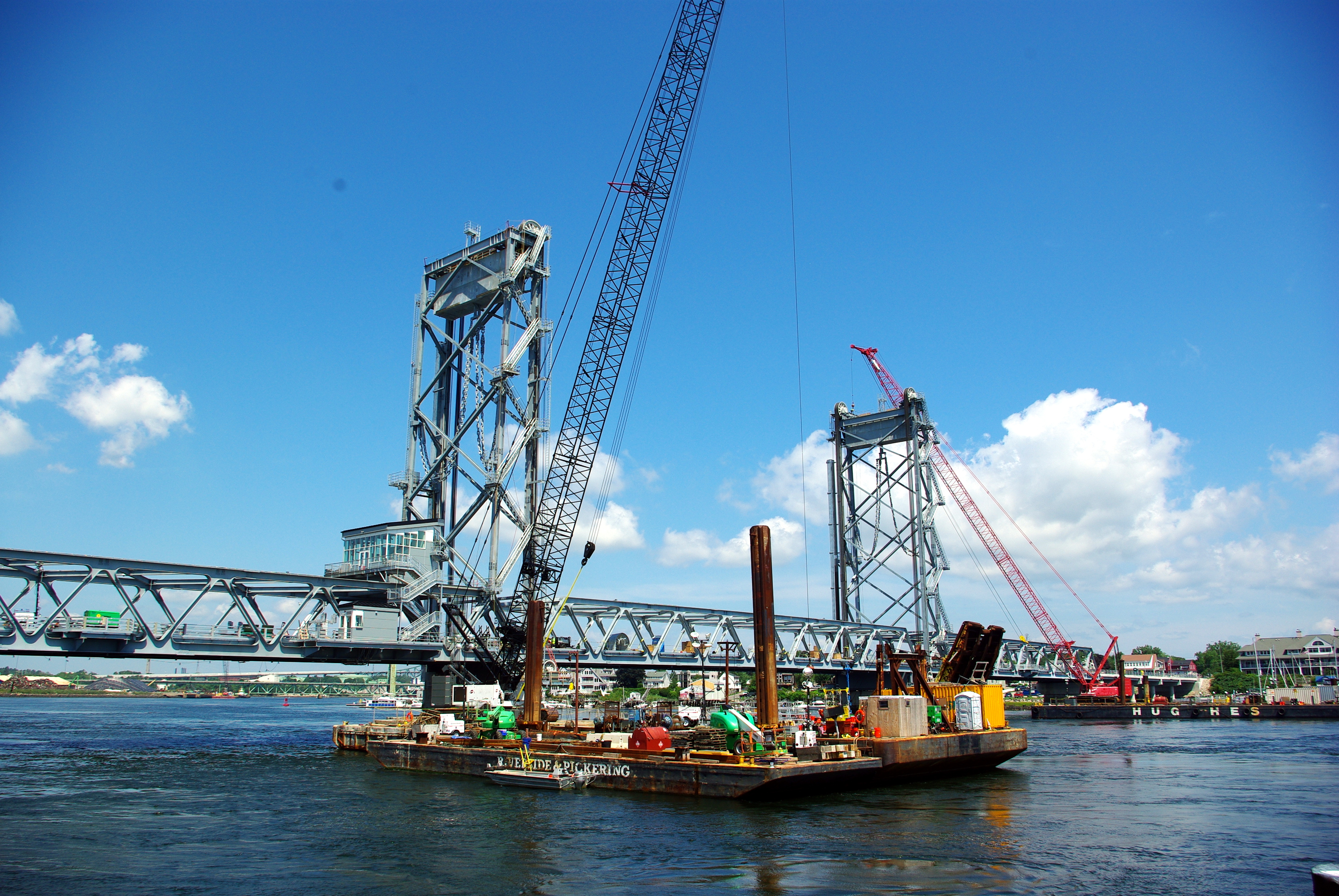
The bridge in July 2013, a month before opening

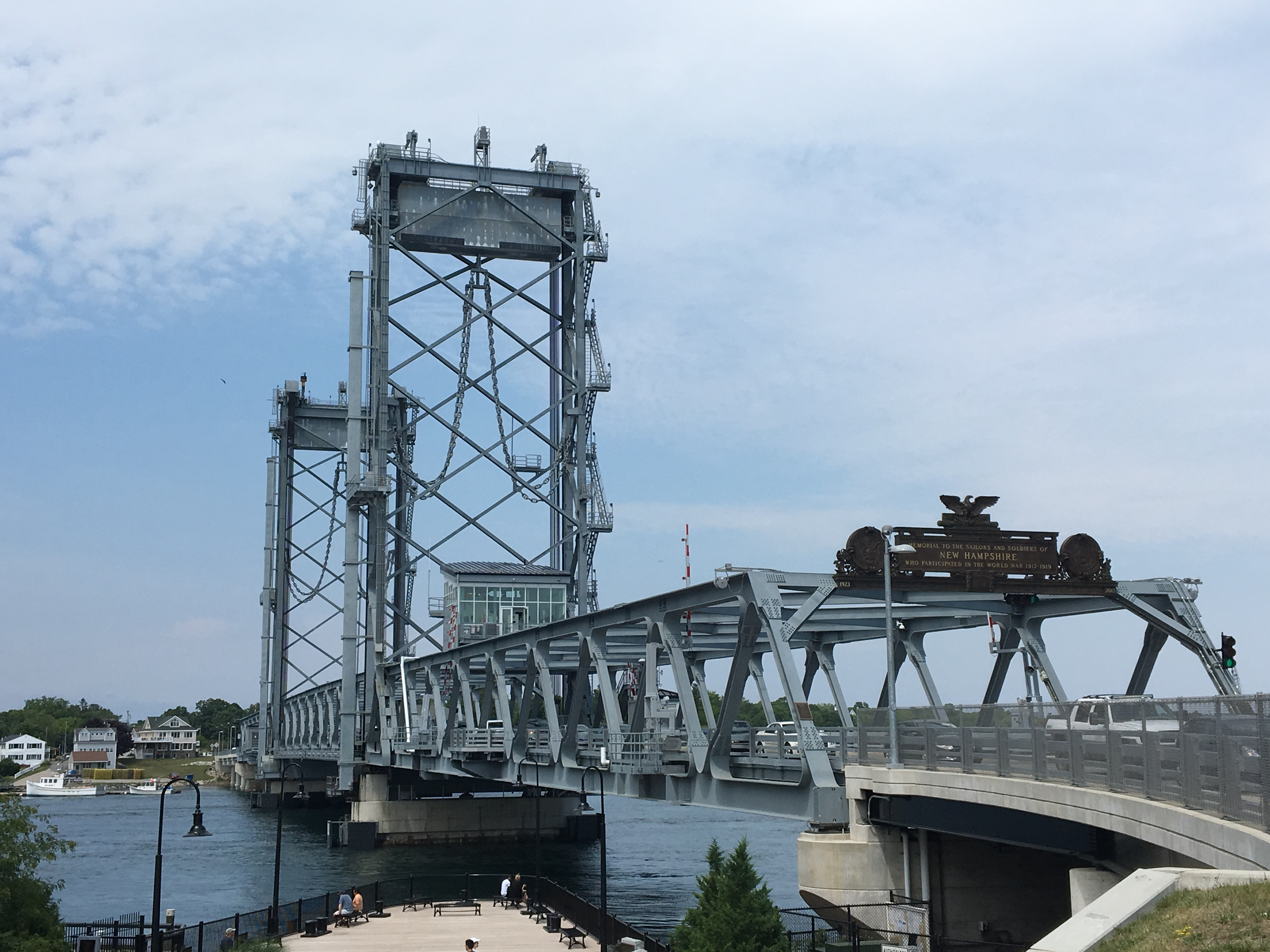
The Portsmouth end of the completed bridge
