= Sherman Adams =

American politician (1899–1986)

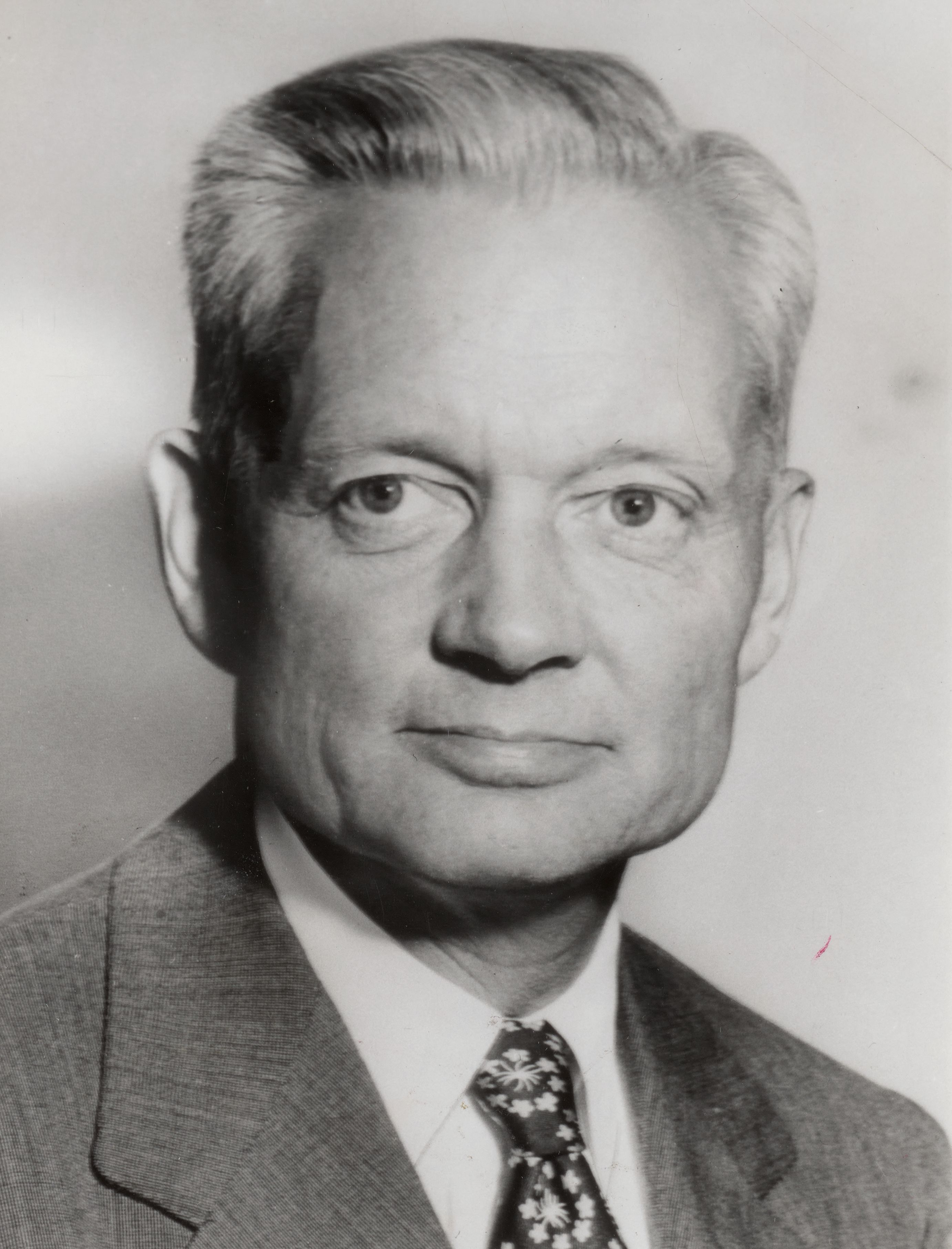
- Adams c. 1955

2nd White House Chief of Staff
- In office January 20, 1953 – October 7, 1958
- President: Dwight D. Eisenhower
- Preceded by: John R. Steelman
- Succeeded by: Wilton Persons

67th Governor of New Hampshire
- In office January 6, 1949 – January 1, 1953
- Preceded by: Charles M. Dale
- Succeeded by: Hugh Gregg

Member of the U.S. House of Representatives from New Hampshire's 2nd district
- In office January 3, 1945 – January 3, 1947
- Preceded by: Foster W. Stearns
- Succeeded by: Norris Cotton

Personal details
- Born: Llewelyn Sherman Adams; January 8, 1899 East Dover, Vermont, U.S.
- Died: October 27, 1986 (aged 87) Hanover, New Hampshire, U.S.
- Party: Republican
- Spouse: Rachel Leona White (m. 1923; died 1979)
- Children: 4
- Education: Dartmouth College (BA)

Military service
- Allegiance: United States
- Branch/service: Marine Corps
- Battles/wars: World War I

Llewelyn Sherman Adams (January 8, 1899 – October 27, 1986) was an American businessman and politician, best known as White House Chief of Staff for President Dwight D. Eisenhower, the culmination of an 18-year political career that also included a stint as the 67th governor of New Hampshire. He lost his White House position in a scandal when he accepted an expensive vicuña coat.

== Early life ==
Born in East Dover, Vermont to grocer Clyde H. Adams and Winnie Marion Sherman, Adams was educated in public schools in Providence, Rhode Island, graduating from Hope High School. He received an undergraduate degree from Dartmouth College (1920), having taken time off briefly for a six-month World War I stint in the United States Marine Corps. While at Dartmouth, Adams helped found Cabin and Trail, Dartmouth's influential hiking club, and was a member of the New Hampshire Alpha chapter of the Sigma Alpha Epsilon fraternity. He then went into the lumber business, first in Healdville, Vermont (1921), then to a combined lumber and paper business in Lincoln, New Hampshire. He also was involved in banking.

== Political beginnings ==
Adams entered state politics in New Hampshire as a Republican legislator (1941–44; Speaker of the House, 1944). He served a term in the United States House of Representatives (1945–47), making a failed effort to capture the 1946 Republican gubernatorial nomination in New Hampshire. He lost to incumbent Charles M. Dale. Adams won the governorship two years later, in 1948.

== New Hampshire governorship ==
When Adams took office as governor, New Hampshire was suffering post-war recession. He called for frugality and thrift in both personal and state expenditures. Retirees were (and are) a significant part of New Hampshire's population; Adams called for increased state aid for the aged, and for legislation which would enable the state's seniors to qualify for Federal Old Age & Survivors Insurance. In 1950 he formed a Reorganization Committee to recommend changes in state operations, and he called for the legislature to act on the recommendations. It was during his time as Governor that the New Hampshire Right to Work law was repealed.

Adams's clipped New Hampshire twang and calls for frugality made him a virtual poster boy for Republican balanced budget values of the time. He served as chairman of the U.S. Conference of Governors (1951–52).

== 1952 campaign ==
Adams took charge of the Eisenhower campaign in the New Hampshire primary, winning all the delegates to the national convention. He campaigned for Eisenhower across the country, was Eisenhower's floor leader at the convention in battling against Senator Robert A. Taft, and impressed Eisenhower with his hard work, mastery of detail, and skill in political maneuvering. He became the campaign manager for the 1952 presidential campaign, where he was always at Eisenhower's side. He was the obvious choice for White House Chief of Staff—and was the first person in this position to hold the explicit title of "Chief of Staff", which Eisenhower had copied from military practice.

== White House Chief of Staff ==
Eisenhower adopted the military model, which emphasizes the importance of the Chief of Staff in handling all of the paperwork and preliminary decisions. With rare exceptions, anyone who spoke with Eisenhower had to have Adams' prior approval. Adams took his role as Chief of Staff very seriously; with the exception of Cabinet members and certain NSC advisors, all requests for access to Eisenhower had to go through his office. This alienated traditional Republican Party leaders.

Adams was one of the most powerful men in Washington during the six years he served as chief of staff. Because of Eisenhower's highly formalized staff structure, it appeared to many that he had virtual control over White House staff operations and domestic policy (a 1956 article in Time entitled "OK, S.A." advanced this perception). The extent of internal strife between strong-willed personalities was chronicled in his 1961 memoir First Hand Report. Among the heated conflicts within the Eisenhower administration were the best method to handle flamboyant personalities such as U.S. Senator Joseph McCarthy, whom Adams and Eisenhower decided to torpedo when McCarthy started attacking the U.S. Army. Adams was a frequent broker of such controversies. Adams was willing to make the partisan comments that Eisenhower stood aloof from, thus making Adams the main target of the Democrats. Adams generally stood with the liberal wing of the Republican Party, in opposition to the conservative wing of Taft and Barry Goldwater. Eisenhower often depended upon him for the evaluation of candidates for top-level appointments. Adams handled much of the patronage and appointments that Eisenhower found boring and also was in charge of firing people when he deemed it necessary.

Movie critic Michael Medved wrote a book on Presidential aides called The Shadow Presidents, that stated Adams was probably the most powerful chief of staff in history. He told of a joke that circulated around Washington in the 1950s. Two Democrats were talking and one said "Wouldn't it be terrible if Eisenhower died and Nixon became President?" The other replied "Wouldn't it be terrible if Sherman Adams died and Eisenhower became President!"

He had a reputation for negativity, endorsing many submissions with a simple "No". This caused him to become known as "The Abominable No Man."

=== Scandal ===
Adams was forced to resign in 1958, when a House subcommittee revealed Adams had accepted an expensive vicuña overcoat and oriental rug from Bernard Goldfine, a Boston textile manufacturer who was being investigated for Federal Trade Commission violations. Goldfine, who had business with the federal government, was cited for contempt of Congress when he refused to answer questions regarding his relationship with Adams. The story was first reported to the public by muckraking journalist Jack Anderson.

Vice President Richard Nixon stated that he was assigned the onerous responsibility of telling Adams that he had to resign. He regretted the necessity, as Adams' career in politics ended and he went off "to operate a ski lodge" without any judicial findings. In the Nixon interviews, Nixon argued that he was unable to fire the White House staffers involved in the Watergate scandal, much as President Eisenhower was unable to directly fire Adams. However, according to Time's September 29, 1958, article on Adams, the job of firing Adams actually fell to Meade Alcorn, not Nixon.

== Post-political life ==
Adams returned to Lincoln, New Hampshire, where he started construction on Loon Mountain, today one of the largest ski resorts in New England. He was also a member of the Society of Colonial Wars and the Sons of the American Revolution.

Adams died in 1986. His remains are buried at Riverside Cemetery in Lincoln.

== Family ==
Adams was married to Rachel Leona White in 1923. They had one son, Samuel, and three daughters, Jean, Sarah and Marion.

== See also ==
- List of Freemasons
- List of members of the American Legion

Political offices
Preceded by Charles H. Barnard	Speaker of the New Hampshire House of Representatives; 1943–1945	Succeeded by Norris Cotton
Preceded by Charles M. Dale	Governor of New Hampshire; 1949–1953	Succeeded by Hugh Gregg
Preceded by John R. Steelman	White House Chief of Staff; 1953–1958	Succeeded by Wilton Persons
U.S. House of Representatives
Preceded by Foster W. Stearns	Member of the U.S. House of Representatives from New Hampshire's 2nd congressional district 1945–1947	Succeeded by Norris Cotton
Party political offices
Preceded by Charles M. Dale	Republican nominee for Governor of New Hampshire; 1948, 1950	Succeeded by Hugh Gregg
