= 1942 Argentine legislative election =

- 1 March 1942
- 85 of the 158 seats in the Chamber of Deputies
- Turnout: 66.80%
| Party | Vote % | Seats | +/– |
|---|---|---|---|
| Concordancia | 53.84 | 47 | +24 |
| Radical Civic Union | 25.41 | 23 | −29 |
| Socialist Party | 9.66 | 12 | +7 |
| Tucumán Radical Civic Union | 1.36 | 1 | +1 |
| Blockist Radical Civic Union | 0.45 | 1 | +1 |
| Salta Radical Civic Union | 0.31 | 1 | +1 |
This lists parties that won seats. See the complete results below.
Results by province

Legislative elections were held in Argentina on 1 March 1942. Voter turnout was 67%.

== Results ==
| Party or alliance | | Votes | % | Seats | |
| Party or alliance | | Votes | % | Won | Total |
|---|---|---|---|---|---|
| Concordancia | National Democratic Party | 655,118 | 33.53 | 29 | 52 |
| Concordancia | Concordancia | 192,844 | 9.87 | 8 | — |
| Concordancia | Santa Fe Radical Civic Union | 151,450 | 7.75 | 8 | 11 |
| Concordancia | Antipersonalist Radical Civic Union | 36,336 | 1.86 | 1 | 5 |
| Concordancia | Agrarian Party–Autonomist Party of Corrientes | 16,100 | 0.82 | 1 | 1 |
| Concordancia | Total | 1,051,848 | 53.84 | 47 | 69 |
| Radical Civic Union | | 496,415 | 25.41 | 23 | 67 |
| Socialist Party | | 188,782 | 9.66 | 12 | 17 |
| Democratic Progressive Party | | 49,198 | 2.52 | 0 | 0 |
| Labour Gathering Party | | 32,126 | 1.64 | 0 | 0 |
| Tucumán Radical Civic Union | | 26,612 | 1.36 | 1 | 1 |
| Taxpayers Union | | 19,922 | 1.02 | 0 | 0 |
| Provincial Defence–White Flag | | 13,229 | 0.68 | 0 | 0 |
| Unified Radical Civic Union | | 13,100 | 0.67 | 0 | 2 |
| Radical Civic Union – Popular Agrarian Front | | 12,955 | 0.66 | 0 | 0 |
| Blockist Radical Civic Union | | 8,864 | 0.45 | 1 | 1 |
| Socialist Workers' Party | | 7,717 | 0.39 | 0 | 0 |
| Radical Party | | 6,234 | 0.32 | 0 | 0 |
| Salta Radical Civic Union | | 6,004 | 0.31 | 1 | 1 |
| Public Health Party | | 5,523 | 0.28 | 0 | 0 |
| Popular Civic Party | | 5,436 | 0.28 | 0 | 0 |
| Democratic Front | | 3,414 | 0.17 | 0 | 0 |
| Conservative Party | | 3,016 | 0.15 | 0 | 0 |
| Neighborhood Union | | 2,364 | 0.12 | 0 | 0 |
| Republican Union | | 713 | 0.04 | 0 | 0 |
| Others | | 330 | 0.02 | 0 | 0 |
| Total | | 1,953,802 | 100.00 | 85 | 158 |
| Valid votes | | 1,953,802 | 95.70 | | |
| Invalid/blank votes | | 87,765 | 4.30 | | |
| Total votes | | 2,041,567 | 100.00 | | |
| Registered voters/turnout | | 3,058,946 | 66.74 | | |
Source: Cantón, El Litoral

=== Results by province ===
| Province | Concordance | | | UCR | | | PS | | | Others | | |
| Province | Votes | % | Seats | Votes | % | Seats | Votes | % | Seats | Votes | % | Seats |
|---|---|---|---|---|---|---|---|---|---|---|---|---|
| Buenos Aires | 349,794 | 77.50 | 16 | 82,165 | 18.20 | 7 | 19,402 | 4.30 | 0 | — | — | — |
| Buenos Aires City | 91,055 | 21.23 | 0 | 124,326 | 28.99 | 6 | 141,968 | 33.10 | 12 | 71,499 | 16.67 | 0 |
| Catamarca | 17,157 | 100 | 2 | — | — | — | — | — | — | — | — | — |
| Córdoba | 86,847 | 42.95 | 2 | 108,119 | 53.47 | 4 | 7,221 | 3.57 | 0 | — | — | — |
| Corrientes | 69,493 | 92.32 | 3 | — | — | — | — | — | — | 5,778 | 7.68 | 0 |
| Entre Ríos | 76,221 | 54.88 | 2 | 58,562 | 42.16 | 1 | 3,978 | 2.86 | 0 | 128 | 0.09 | 0 |
| Jujuy | 12,810 | 69.92 | 2 | 5,511 | 30.08 | 0 | — | — | — | — | — | — |
| La Rioja | 12,664 | 96.57 | 2 | 450 | 3.43 | 0 | — | — | — | — | — | — |
| Mendoza | 53,586 | 77.37 | 2 | 10,983 | 15.86 | 1 | 938 | 1.35 | 0 | 3,752 | 5.42 | 0 |
| Salta | 27,957 | 77.08 | 2 | 2,309 | 6.37 | 0 | — | — | — | 6,004 | 16.55 | 1 |
| San Juan | 23,846 | 64.33 | 2 | 2,391 | 6.45 | 0 | 1,966 | 5.30 | 0 | 8,864 | 23.91 | 1 |
| Santa Fe | 151,450 | 53.57 | 8 | 75,266 | 26.62 | 3 | 6,587 | 2.33 | 0 | 49,400 | 17.47 | 0 |
| Santiago del Estero | 48,122 | 63.82 | 2 | 14,181 | 18.81 | 1 | — | — | — | 13,100 | 17.37 | 0 |
| Tucumán | 30,846 | 28.57 | 2 | 12,152 | 11.26 | 0 | 6,722 | 6.23 | 0 | 58,232 | 53.94 | 1 |
| Total | 1,051,848 | 53.84 | 47 | 496,415 | 25.41 | 23 | 188,782 | 9.66 | 12 | 216,757 | 11.09 | 3 |
