= 1942 Texas lieutenant gubernatorial election =

- November 3, 1942
Nominee	John Lee Smith
Party	Democratic
Popular vote	278,396
Percentage	96.73%
Lieutenant Governor before election
Vacant
Elected Lieutenant Governor
John Lee Smith
Democratic

The 1942 Texas lieutenant gubernatorial election was held on November 3, 1942, in order to elect the lieutenant governor of Texas. Democratic nominee and former member of the Texas Senate John Lee Smith defeated Republican nominee B. J. Peasley.

== General election ==
On election day, November 3, 1942, Democratic nominee John Lee Smith won the election by a margin of 268,974 votes against his opponent Republican nominee B. J. Peasley, thereby retaining Democratic control over the office of lieutenant governor. Smith was sworn in as the 32nd lieutenant governor of Texas on January 19, 1943.

=== Results ===
Texas lieutenant gubernatorial election, 1942
Party	Candidate	Votes	%
Democratic	John Lee Smith	278,396	96.73
Republican	B. J. Peasley	9,422	3.27
Total votes		287,818	100.00
Democratic hold			
