= 1940 New Hampshire gubernatorial election =

- November 5, 1940
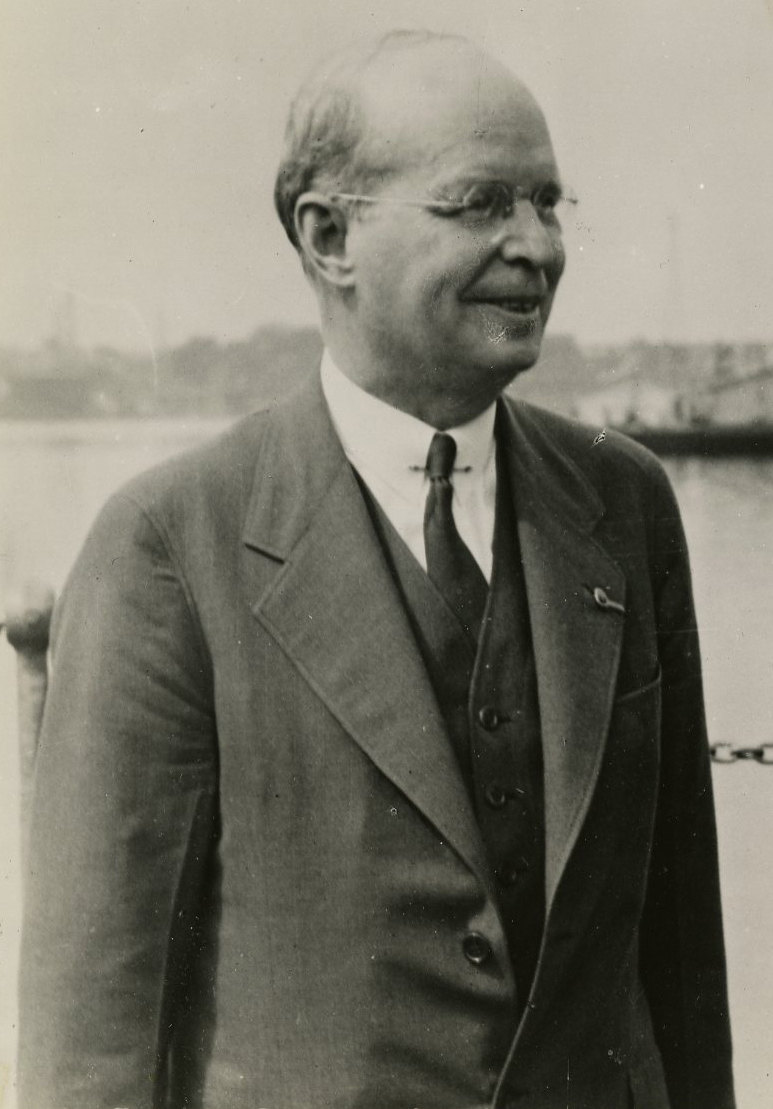

Nominee	Robert O. Blood	F. Clyde Keefe
Party	Republican	Democratic
Popular vote	112,386	109,093
Percentage	50.74%	49.26%
- Blood: 50–60% 60–70% 70–80% 80–90% >90% Keefe: 50–60% 60–70% 70–80% 80–90%
Governor before election
Francis P. Murphy
Republican
Elected Governor
Robert O. Blood
Republican

The 1940 New Hampshire gubernatorial election was held on November 5, 1940. Republican nominee Robert O. Blood defeated Democratic nominee F. Clyde Keefe with 50.74% of the vote.

== Primary elections ==
Primary elections were held on September 10, 1940.

=== Republican primary ===
==== Candidates ====
- Robert O. Blood, President of the New Hampshire Senate
- James C. Farmer

==== Results ====
Republican primary results
Party	Candidate	Votes	%
Republican	Robert O. Blood	29,599	50.66
Republican	James C. Farmer	28,831	49.34
Total votes		58,430	100.00

== General election ==
=== Candidates ===
- Robert O. Blood, Republican
- F. Clyde Keefe, Democratic

=== Results ===
1940 New Hampshire gubernatorial election
Party	Candidate	Votes	%	±%
Republican	Robert O. Blood	112,386	50.74%	
Democratic	F. Clyde Keefe	109,093	49.26%	
Majority		3,293		
Turnout		221,479		
Republican hold		Swing		
