= Robert O. Blood =

American physician and politician

Robert Blood
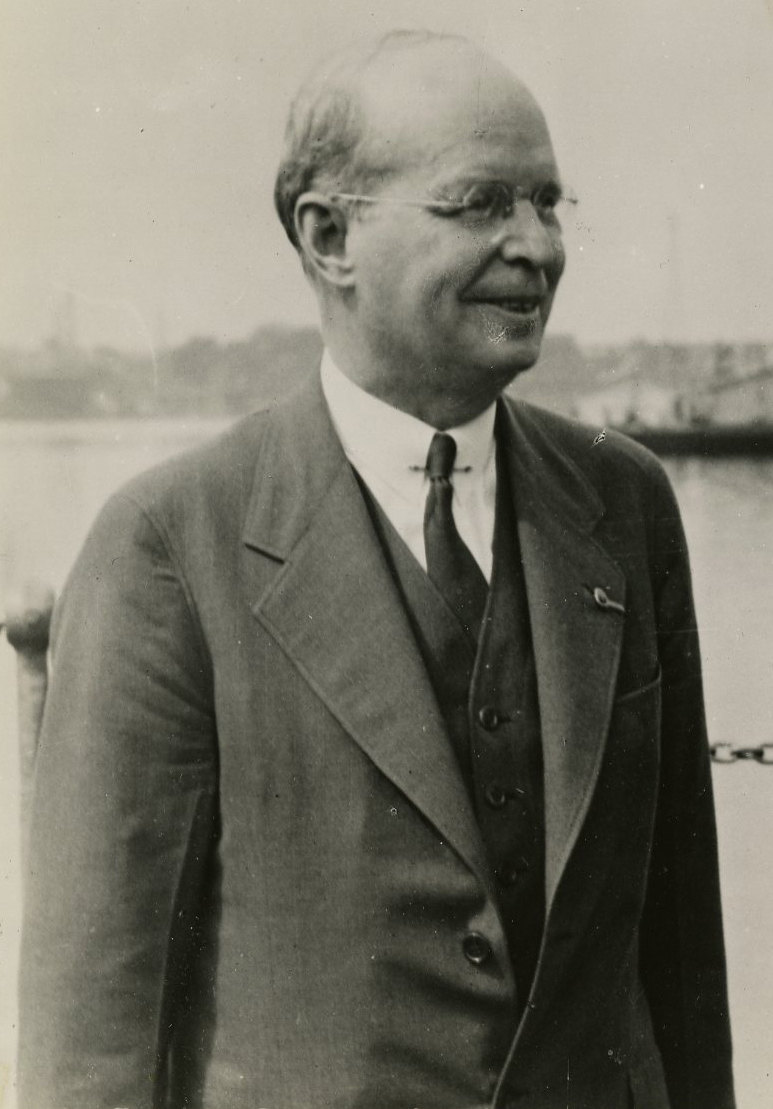

65th Governor of New Hampshire
- In office January 2, 1941 – January 4, 1945
- Preceded by: Francis P. Murphy
- Succeeded by: Charles M. Dale

Member of the New Hampshire Senate
- In office 1937–1940

Member of the New Hampshire House of Representatives
- In office 1935–1936

Personal details
- Born: Robert Oscar Blood; November 10, 1887 Enfield, New Hampshire, U.S.
- Died: August 3, 1975 (aged 87) Concord, New Hampshire, U.S.
- Party: Republican

Robert Oscar Blood (November 10, 1887 – August 3, 1975) was an American physician and Republican politician from Concord, New Hampshire. He served in both houses of the New Hampshire legislature and was the 65th governor of New Hampshire from 1941 to 1945.

Blood was born in Enfield, New Hampshire, and studied at Dartmouth College and then Dartmouth Medical School, graduating in 1913 and establishing a long-standing practice in Concord from 1915 (lasting until just a few years before his death). He served in the U.S. Medical Corps 1917-1919, leaving the service a lieutenant-colonel with decorations from both Britain and France.

Blood began his political career in 1935, serving in the state's House (1935–36) and Senate (1937–40, president 1939-40). He won a close contest in the Republican direct primary for governor and won the election by just 800 votes. He was re-elected in 1942, but lost in 1944. His time in office was dominated by the war, but he championed his long-standing interest in veterans' affairs and was active in improving the financial condition of the state government. He lost the Congressional primary in 1946. From 1944 to 1960, Blood was the New Hampshire delegate to Republican National Convention.

He married Pauline Shepard in 1916 and they had three children: Robert Oscar Blood, II, Horace Shepard Blood, and Emily Blood.

Blood died at Concord in 1975 and is buried at the Blossom Hill Cemetery there. His collection of fine porcelain was donated to the state after his death and was placed in Bridges House - the Governor's mansion.

Party political offices
| Preceded by Francis P. Murphy | Republican nominee for Governor of New Hampshire; 1940, 1942 | Succeeded by Charles M. Dale |
Political offices
| Preceded by Francis P. Murphy | Governor of New Hampshire; 1941–1945 | Succeeded by Charles M. Dale |
