= Charles M. Dale =

Governor of New Hampshire

Charles Dale
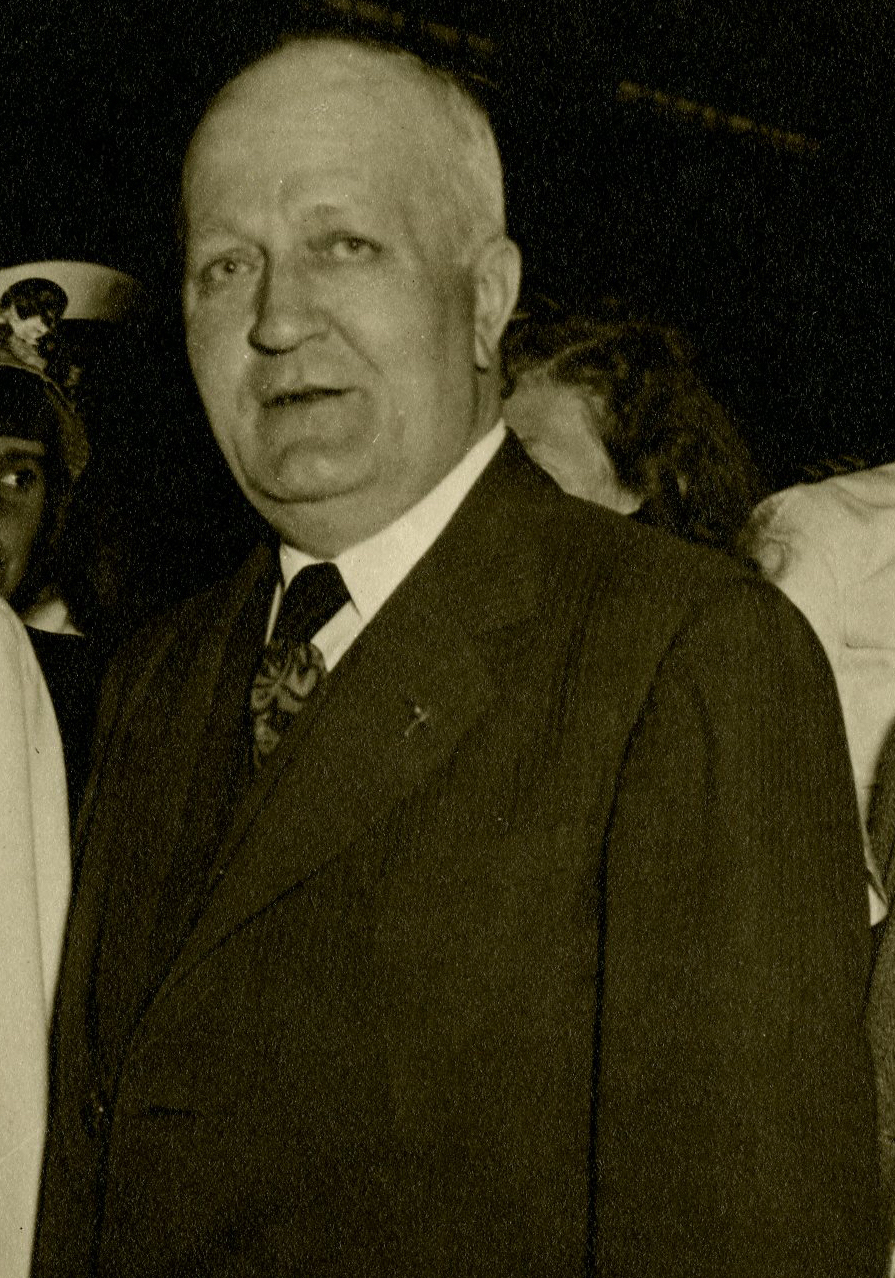

66th Governor of New Hampshire
- In office January 4, 1945 – January 6, 1949
- Preceded by: Robert O. Blood
- Succeeded by: Sherman Adams

Member of the New Hampshire Senate
- In office 1933

Personal details
- Born: Charles Milby Dale; March 8, 1893 Browns Valley, Minnesota, U.S.
- Died: September 28, 1978 (aged 85) Portsmouth, New Hampshire, U.S.
- Party: Republican
- Education: University of Minnesota

Charles Milby Dale (March 8, 1893 – September 28, 1978) was an American lawyer and Republican politician from Portsmouth, New Hampshire. He was the 66th governor of New Hampshire, serving from 1945 to 1949.

== Early career ==
Dale was born in 1893 in Browns Valley, Minnesota, on the Minnesota—South Dakota border. He attended the University of Minnesota, and then the University of Minnesota Law School; while in law school he served as Note Editor of the first volume of the Minnesota Law Review and graduated in 1917. After law school he began a legal practice back in Brown's Valley, but upon the United States' entry into World War I he left to enlist in the United States Army. Dale was assigned to the Coast Artillery Corps stationed in Portsmouth, New Hampshire.

== Political career ==
After the war, Dale decided to remain in Portsmouth and open his legal practice there. He soon found his way into politics; he was first elected city solicitor in 1921 and later mayor from 1926 to 1928. He went back to legal practice but was elected in 1933 to the state senate, where he served as president. In 1937 he was elected to the Executive Council of New Hampshire. He returned to the state senate, then again served at the Mayor of Portsmouth from 1943 to 1944. He entered the Governor's race and during the Republican primary election defeated incumbent Governor Robert Blood. Dale then went on to win the general election and win reelection for a second two-year term.

Dale retired from politics in 1948 to work in banking and radio in New Hampshire. He died in 1978 in Portsmouth.

== See also ==
- List of mayors of Portsmouth, New Hampshire

Party political offices
Preceded by Robert O. Blood	Republican nominee for Governor of New Hampshire; 1944, 1946	Succeeded by Sherman Adams
Political offices
Preceded by Robert O. Blood	Governor of New Hampshire; 1945–1949	Succeeded by Sherman Adams
