= 1942 New Hampshire gubernatorial election =

Hampshire gubernatorial election 1942

- November 3, 1942
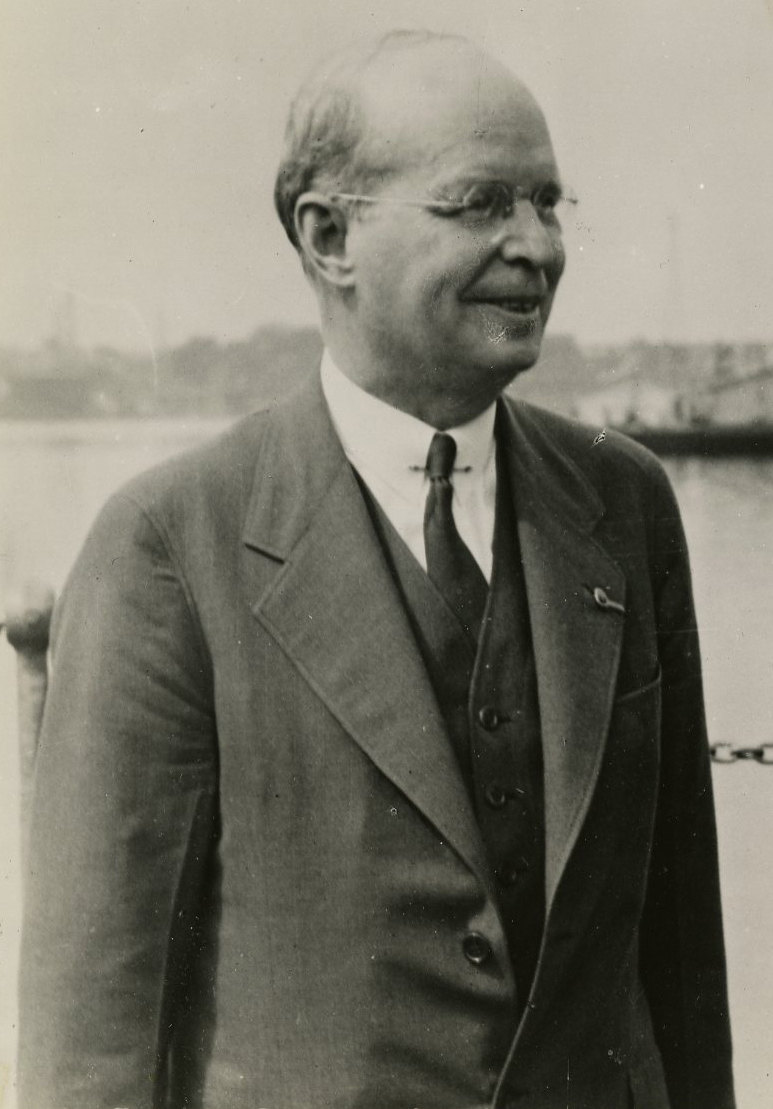

Nominee	Robert O. Blood	William J. Neal
Party	Republican	Democratic
Popular vote	83,766	76,782
Percentage	52.18%	47.83%
- Blood: 50–60% 60–70% 70–80% 80–90% >90% Neal: 50–60% 60–70% 70–80% 80–90% >90% Tie: 50%
Governor before election
Robert O. Blood
Republican
Elected Governor
Robert O. Blood
Republican

The 1942 New Hampshire gubernatorial election was held on November 3, 1942. Incumbent Republican Robert O. Blood defeated Democratic nominee William J. Neal with 52.18% of the vote.

== General election ==
=== Candidates ===
- Robert O. Blood, Republican
- William J. Neal, Democratic

=== Results ===
1942 New Hampshire gubernatorial election
Party	Candidate	Votes	%	±%
Republican	Robert O. Blood (incumbent)	83,766	52.18%	
Democratic	William J. Neal	76,782	47.83%	
Majority		6,984		
Turnout		160,548		
Republican hold		Swing		
