= 1942 Nevada gubernatorial election =

- November 3, 1942
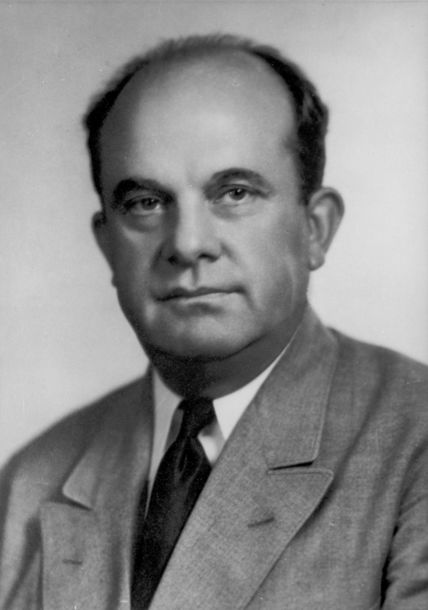

Nominee	Edward P. Carville	Aaron V. Tallman
Party	Democratic	Republican
Popular vote	24,505	16,164
Percentage	60.25%	39.75%
- County results Carville: 50–60% 60–70% 70–80% 80–90% Tallman: 60–70%
Governor before election
Edward P. Carville
Democratic
Elected Governor
Edward P. Carville
Democratic

The 1942 Nevada gubernatorial election was held on November 3, 1942. Incumbent Democrat Edward P. Carville defeated Republican nominee Aaron V. Tallman with 60.26% of the vote.

== Primary elections ==
Primary elections were held on September 1, 1942.

=== Democratic primary ===
==== Candidates ====
- Edward P. Carville, incumbent Governor
- Roland H. Wiley, Clark County District Attorney

==== Results ====
Democratic primary results
Party	Candidate	Votes	%
Democratic	Edward P. Carville (inc.)	13,494	62.89
Democratic	Roland H. Wiley	7,964	37.11
Total votes		21,458	100.00

== General election ==
=== Candidates ===
- Edward P. Carville, Democratic
- Aaron V. Tallman, Republican

=== Results ===
1942 Nevada gubernatorial election
Party	Candidate	Votes	%	±%
Democratic	Edward P. Carville (inc.)	24,505	60.25%	−1.61%
Republican	Aaron V. Tallman	16,164	39.75%	+1.61%
Majority		8,341	20.51%	
Total votes		40,669	100.00%	
Democratic hold		Swing	-3.22%	

=== Results by county ===
County	Edward P. Carville Democratic		Aaron V. Tallman Republican		Margin		Total votes cast
County	#	%	#	%	#	%	Total votes cast
Churchill	864	50.15%	859	49.85%	5	0.29%	1,723
Clark	4,707	80.50%	1,140	19.50%	3,567	61.01%	5,847
Douglas	477	60.69%	309	39.31%	168	21.37%	786
Elko	2,453	74.24%	851	25.76%	1,602	48.49%	3,304
Esmeralda	300	64.66%	164	35.34%	136	29.31%	464
Eureka	314	57.09%	236	42.91%	78	14.18%	550
Humboldt	632	33.92%	1,231	66.08%	-599	-32.15%	1,863
Lander	508	65.80%	264	34.20%	244	31.61%	772
Lincoln	1,296	70.67%	538	29.33%	758	41.33%	1,834
Lyon	780	52.31%	711	47.69%	69	4.63%	1,491
Mineral	871	64.09%	488	35.91%	383	28.18%	1,359
Nye	797	51.65%	746	48.35%	51	3.31%	1,543
Ormsby	946	67.77%	450	32.23%	496	35.53%	1,396
Pershing	545	55.67%	434	44.33%	111	11.34%	979
Storey	285	63.05%	167	36.95%	118	26.11%	452
Washoe	6,287	50.01%	6,285	49.99%	2	0.02%	12,572
White Pine	2,443	65.43%	1,291	34.57%	1,152	30.85%	3,734
Totals	24,505	60.25%	16,164	39.75%	8,341	20.51%	40,669

==== Counties that flipped from Republican to Democratic ====
- Churchill
- Douglas

==== Counties that flipped from Democratic to Republican ====
- Humboldt
