= 1942 Georgia gubernatorial election =

1942 Georgia Democratic gubernatorial primary
- September 9, 1942

410 county unit votes 206 unit votes needed to win
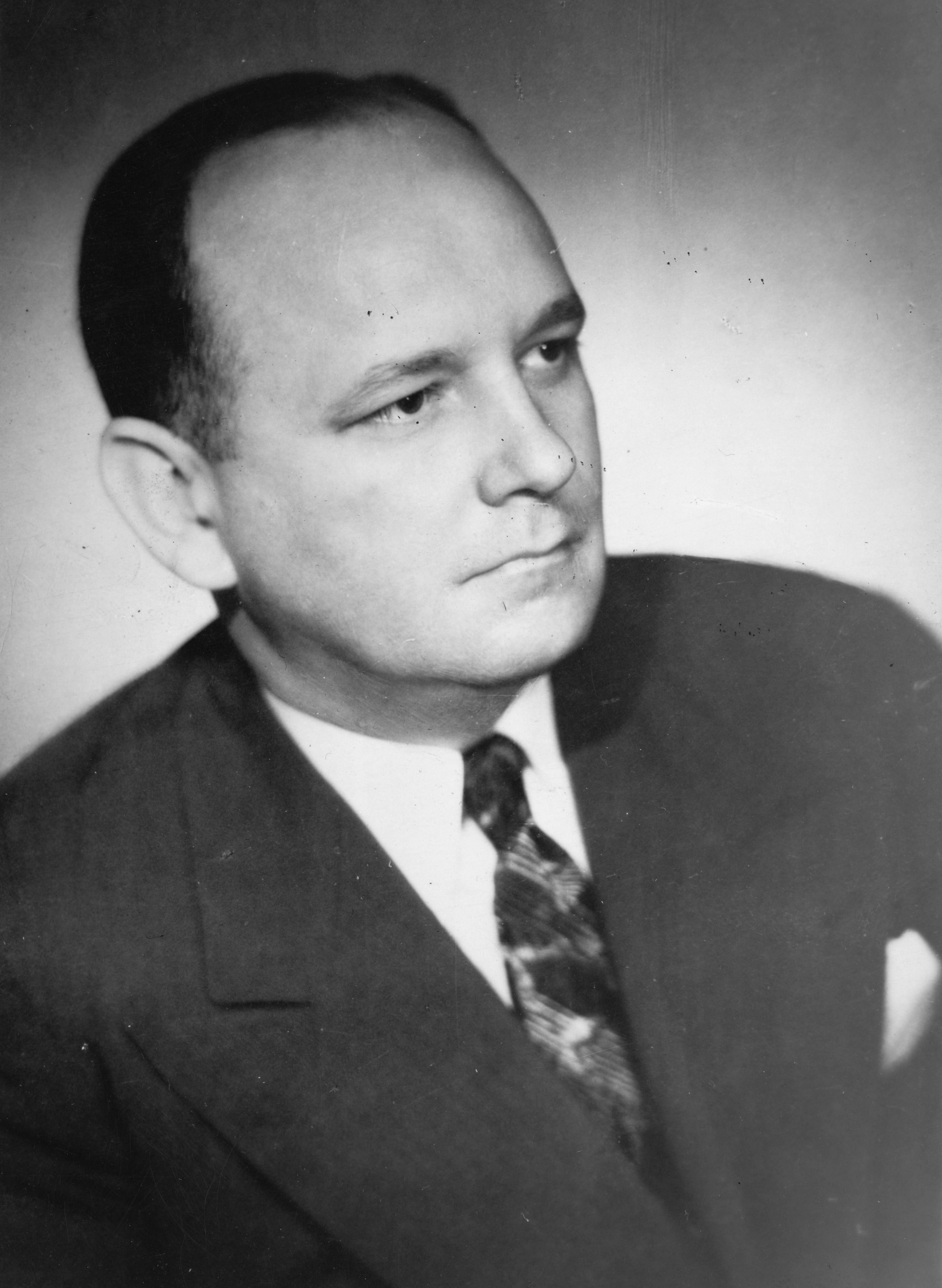

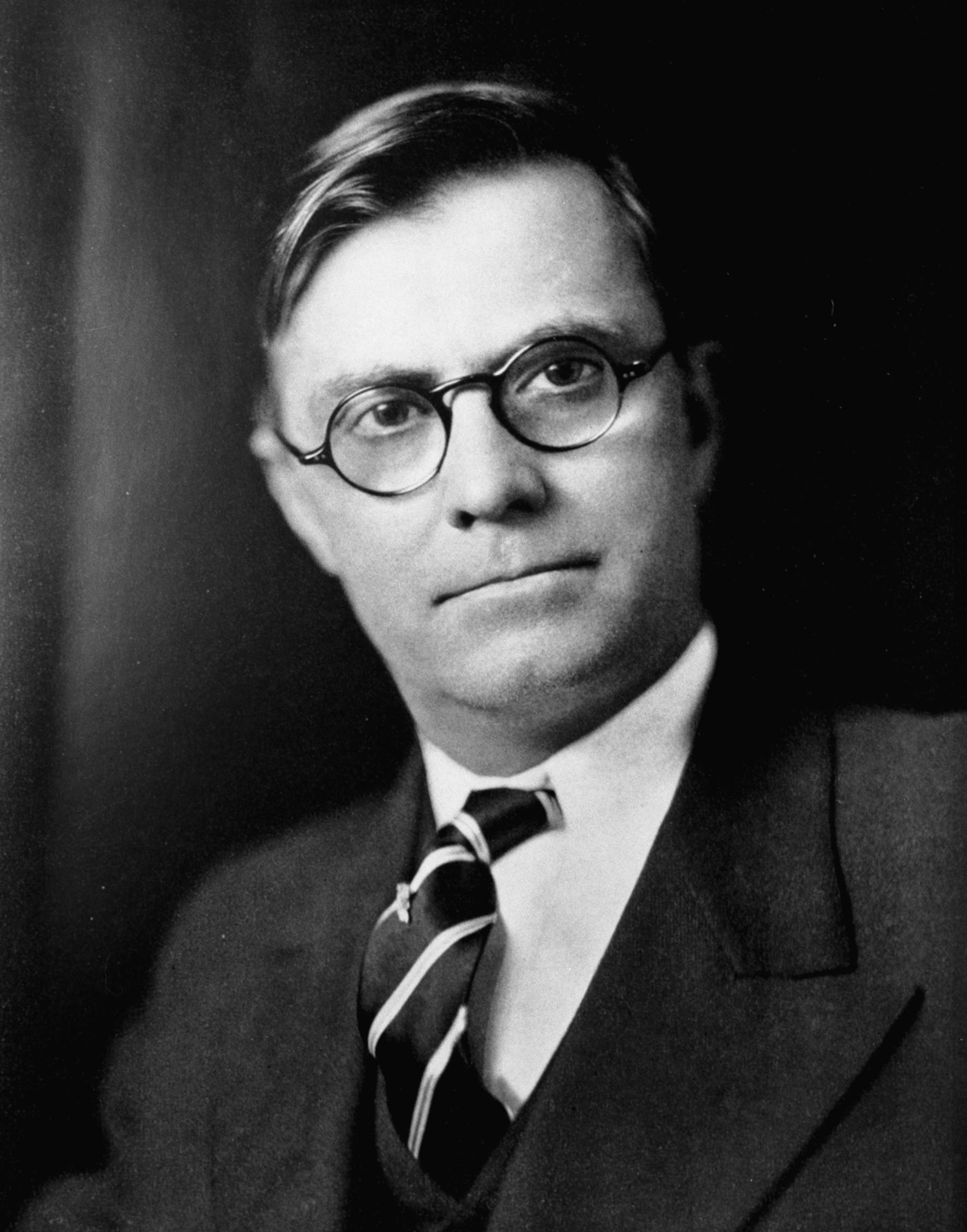
Nominee	Ellis Arnall	Eugene Talmadge
Party	Democratic	Democratic
Electoral vote	261	149
Popular vote	174,757	128,399
Percentage	57.65%	42.35%
- County results Arnall: 50–60% 60–70% 70–80% 80–90% Talmadge: 50–60% 60–70% 70–80% 80–90%
Governor before election
Eugene Talmadge
Democratic
Elected Governor
Ellis Arnall
Democratic

The 1942 Georgia gubernatorial election took place on November 3, 1942, in order to elect the governor of Georgia. The governor was elected to a four-year term for the first time, instead of a two-year term.

Incumbent Democratic governor Eugene Talmadge was defeated in the Democratic primary.

As was common at the time, the Democratic candidate ran with only token opposition in the general election so therefore the Democratic primary was the real contest, and winning the primary was considered tantamount to election.

== Democratic primary ==
The Democratic primary election was held on September 9, 1942. As there were only two candidates, there was no run-off.

=== County unit system ===
From 1917 until 1962, the Democratic Party in the U.S. state of Georgia used a voting system called the county unit system to determine victors in statewide primary elections.

The system was ostensibly designed to function similarly to the Electoral College, but in practice the large ratio of unit votes for small, rural counties to unit votes for more populous urban areas provided outsized political influence to the smaller counties.

Under the county unit system, the 159 counties in Georgia were divided by population into three categories. The largest eight counties were classified as "Urban", the next-largest 30 counties were classified as "Town", and the remaining 121 counties were classified as "Rural". Urban counties were given 6 unit votes, Town counties were given 4 unit votes, and Rural counties were given 2 unit votes, for a total of 410 available unit votes. Each county's unit votes were awarded on a winner-take-all basis.

Candidates were required to obtain a majority of unit votes (not necessarily a majority of the popular vote), or 206 total unit votes, to win the election. If no candidate received a majority in the initial primary, a runoff election was held between the top two candidates to determine a winner.

=== Candidates ===
- Ellis Arnall, Attorney General of Georgia
- Eugene Talmadge, incumbent governor

=== Results ===
Candidate	Popular vote		County unit vote	
Candidate	Votes	%	Votes	%
Ellis Arnall	174,757	57.65	261	63.66
Eugene Talmadge	128,399	42.35	149	36.34
Total	303,156	100.00	410	100.00

== General election ==
In the general election, Arnall faced token opposition.

=== Results ===
1942 Georgia gubernatorial election
Party	Candidate	Votes	%	±%
Democratic	Ellis Arnall	62,220	96.30%	
Write-in	D. Talmadge Bowers	1,701	2.63%	
Write-in	J. N. Foreman	687	1.06%	
Turnout		64,608	100.00%	
Democratic hold		Swing		

== Bibliography ==
- Gubernatorial Elections, 1787-1997. Washington, D.C.: Congressional Quarterly Inc. 1998. ISBN 1-56802-396-0.
- Glashan, Roy R. (1979). American Governors and Gubernatorial Elections, 1775-1978. Meckler Books. ISBN 0-930466-17-9.
- Compiled by Mrs. J.E. Hays, State Historian and Director (1943). Georgia's Official Register, 1939-1941-1943 (PDF). Atlanta, GA: State of Georgia, Department of Archives and History.
