= 1937 United States Senate special election in Arkansas =

- October 19, 1937
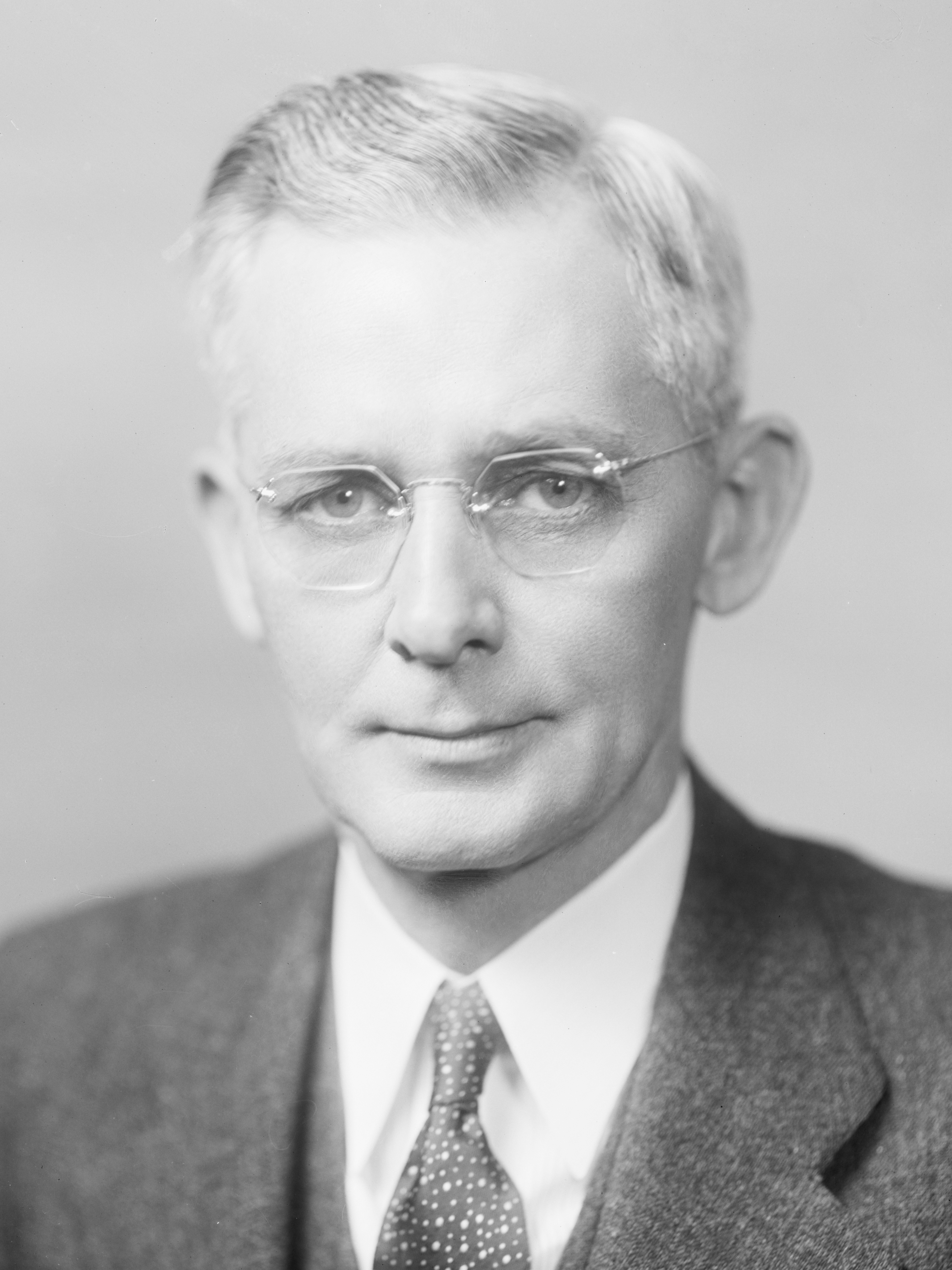

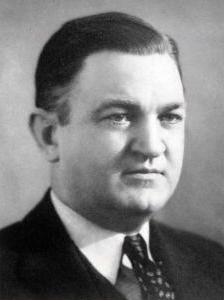
Nominee	John E. Miller	Carl E. Bailey
Party	Independent Democrat	Democratic
Popular vote	65,802	43,125
Percentage	60.41%	39.59%
- County results Miller: 50–60% 60–70% 70–80% 80–90% >90% Bailey: 50–60% 60–70% 70–80% >90%
U.S. senator before election
Joseph T. Robinson
Democratic
Elected U.S. senator
John E. Miller (Note: Though he ran as an independent, Miller was so clearly a Democrat that most records indicate both candidates as Democrats, including the Official Congressional Directory.)
Independent Democrat

The 1937 Arkansas special senatorial election was held on October 19, 1937, following the death of longtime Democratic senator Joe T. Robinson. Robinson was a powerful senator, staunch Democrat, and strong supporter of United States President Franklin D. Roosevelt, and was instrumental in passing many New Deal programs through the Senate. Arkansas was essentially a one-party state during the Solid South period; the Democratic Party controlled all aspects of state and local office. Recently elected Democratic Governor of Arkansas Carl E. Bailey initially considered appointing himself to finish Robinson's term, but later acceded to a nomination process by the Democratic Central Committee, avoiding a public primary but breaking a campaign process. Avoiding the primary so angered the public and establishment Democrats, leading them to coalesce behind longtime Democrat John E. Miller as an independent, forcing a general election.

The 1937 special election was a public battle in a long-standing war between establishment politicians (Arkansas's "Old Guard" Democrats), conservative Democrats that repudiated the growing role of the United States government during the Progressive Era, especially under Franklin D. Roosevelt, and a growing populist and reform movement. Future governor Homer Adkins led the efforts to oppose Bailey, harboring a personal grudge since their time in the Pulaski County Courthouse. Voters ultimately rejected Bailey's power grab and handily elected Miller to fill the unexpired term. Miller would serve in the term until 1941, retiring to become a judge in the United States District Court for the Western District of Arkansas. The remainder of the term would be filled by Lloyd Spencer (appointed), who did not stand election in 1942.

== Vacancy ==
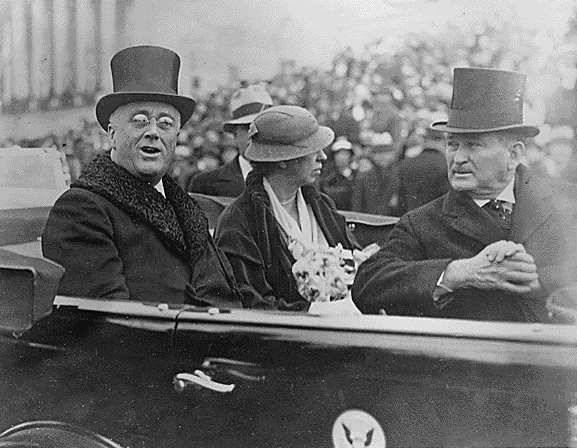
FDR, Eleanor Roosevelt, and Robinson in 1933

Joe T. Robinson served in the US Senate since 1913, and as Democratic minority leader since 1922. He became majority leader when the Democrats took the Senate in the realigning 1932 elections, known as the genesis of the New Deal coalition. Robinson was a fierce ally of Democratic presidents Woodrow Wilson and Franklin Roosevelt, and supported many of the progressive policies of Theodore Roosevelt. After his abrupt passing in July 1937 at the age of 64, a large void opened in state politics.

=== Setting ===
During the Solid South period, Arkansas was ruled by the Democratic party. A Democratic primary win was tantamount to election; most policy or personal political fights were fought months ahead of the general election, or behind closed doors in party meetings. The New Deal had brought millions of government dollars to the poor state, creating a group of politicians more loyal to the political patronage system from the federal level. In Arkansas, patronage had been operated by Robinson, creating a league of bureaucrats and officials owing their positions to Robinson known as the Old Guard Democrats. Moderate Democrats, political outsiders, and opponents of the Old Guard Democrats like Harvey Parnell rejected the cronyism and corruption passed through the patronage system and often sought reform, but struggled to reform the system, even from the Governor's office.

== Candidates ==
Shortly after Robinson's death, rumors about who would fill the remaining 5 1/2-year term began in Arkansas newspapers.

Carl Bailey, a lawyer originally from the Missouri Bootheel, had won the 1936 Arkansas gubernatorial election. Famous for having rejected a $50,000 bribe from infamous New York City mobster and boss of the Genovese crime family Lucky Luciano while he was Arkansas Attorney General, Bailey was an antiestablishment politician who ran on replacing government patronage positions with qualified people hired on a merit basis. Like most Arkansas Democrats at the time, Bailey strongly supported the New Deal, which was wildly popular in a poor agricultural state still recovering from the Great Depression. Bailey's antiestablishment credentials and calls for reform in state offices made him unpopular with the establishment, "Old Guard" Democrats who also supported (and in many cases derived their livelihoods from) the New Deal. Conservative Democrats also disagreed with Bailey, whose expanding state government reversed previous governor J. Marion Futrell's policies of state retrenchment in the face of federal expansion.

Despite a narrow victory in 1936, Bailey had a sufficient mandate to create a civil service commission (the first in a Southern state), reorganize the Welfare Department to redirect federal aid more efficiently, and doubled funding for school districts.

=== Declined ===
- Homer Adkins, Collector for Internal Revenue in Arkansas
- Claude A. Fuller, U.S. House of Representatives member representing Arkansas's 3rd district
- Jack Holt, Attorney General of Arkansas
- John L. McClellan, U.S. House of Representatives member representing Arkansas's 6th district
- Vincent Miles of Fort Smith

== Election ==
The first question was whether the vacancy would be filled by a Democratic primary or nomination of the Arkansas Democratic Central Committee. At a meeting of a Democratic Party subcommittee to resolve this question, there was strong support for a primary among rank-and-file party members, but Committee nomination was favored by the officeholders and politicians. Party leaders favored Bailey, who said "my enemies may fear the worst" at the subcommittee meeting. At the meeting, allegations were made that Homer Adkins had ordered his staff to circulate petitions in their home counties across the state to generate support for a primary in opposition to Bailey's nomination.

On July 23, 1937, the Committee named Bailey as the Democratic candidate for US Senate, almost assuring his victory in the special election.

Many of the efficiencies created by Bailey's welfare reorganization came at the expense of the bureaucrats appointed through the patronage system. Adkins was Robinson's man in Arkansas, dispensing patronage to loyalists through various New Deal agencies. In addition to Bailey's open threats to disrupt the Robinson political machine, Adkins also harbored a personal dislike of Bailey dating back to the time they shared together in the Pulaski County Courthouse.

=== Results ===
Arkansas special senate election, 1937
Party	Candidate	Votes	%
Independent Democrat	John E. Miller	65,802	60.41%
Democratic	Carl E. Bailey	43,125	39.59%
Total votes		108,927	100.00%
Democratic hold			

== See also ==
- 1954 United States Senate election in South Carolina, A similar situation occurred where the candidate endorsed by the Democratic Party also lost the election.
