= 1936 Arkansas elections =

Arkansas held a general election on November 3, 1936. At the top of the ticket, Franklin D. Roosevelt won the state handily in his reelection bid. Arkansans reelected Joe T. Robinson to the United States Senate for a fifth term. For the United States House of Representatives, the six Representatives seeking reelection were unopposed in the general election. In the Arkansas 7th, Wade Kitchens replaced a retiring Tilman B. Parks.

All of Arkansas's statewide constitutional offices were up for reelection, including governor. During the Solid South, the Democratic Party held firm control of virtually every office in The South, including Arkansas. Winning the Democratic primary was considered tantamount to election, with several different factions of the party battling in the open primaries. Incumbent J. Marion Futrell retired from politics and was replaced by Attorney General of Arkansas Carl E. Bailey; all other state constitutional offices were held by the Democrats without general election opposition.

== State ==
=== Governor ===
County results, gubernatorial Bailey: 50–60% 60–70% 70–80% 80–90% 90%+ Cobb: 50–60% 60–70% 70–80%

=== Lieutenant governor ===
Bob Bailey (no relation to Carl Bailey) won the nomination for Lieutenant Governor of Arkansas from a five-candidate field in the Democratic primary.

Democratic primary, 1936
Party	Candidate	Votes	%
Democratic	Bob Bailey	78,727	34.2
Democratic	Harvey G. Combs	65,838	28.6
Democratic	Speaker of the House Harvey B. Thorn	35,330	15.3
Democratic	O. E. Gates	25,961	11.3
Democratic	Sam Levine	24,565	10.7
Total votes		230,421	100.0

Bailey defeated Republican and Socialist challengers by a wide margin in the general election.

General election, 1936
Party	Candidate	Votes	%
Democratic	Carl E. Bailey	155,152	84.89
Republican	Osro Cobb	26,875	14.71
Socialist	J. Russell Butler	733	0.40
Total votes		182,760	100.00
