= 1946 United States gubernatorial elections =

- November 5, 1946; September 9, 1946 (ME)

34 governorships
	Majority party	Minority party
Party	Republican	Democratic
Seats before	22	26 (Note: Charles Wilbert Snow (D) succeeded Connecticut Governor Raymond E. Baldwin (R) who resigned to take a seat in the U.S. Senate in December 1946.)
Seats after	25	23
Seat change	▲3	▼3
Seats up	17	17
Seats won	20	14
- Democratic hold Democratic gain Republican hold Republican gain No election

United States gubernatorial elections were held in 1946, in 34 states, concurrent with the House and Senate elections, on November 5, 1946. Elections took place on September 9 in Maine.

In Idaho, the governor was elected to a 4-year term for the first time, instead of a 2-year term. In New Jersey, this was the last election on a 3-year cycle, before switching to a 4-year term for governors from 1949.

== Race summary ==
State	Governor	Party	First elected	Status	Candidates
Alabama	Chauncey Sparks	Democratic	1942	Incumbent term-limited. Democratic hold.	▌ ✓ Jim Folsom (Democratic) 88.7%; ▌ Lyman Ward (Republican) 11.3%
Arizona	Sidney Preston Osborn	Democratic	1940	Incumbent re-elected.	▌ ✓ Sidney Preston Osborn (Democratic) 60.1%; ▌ Bruce Brockett (Republican) 39.9%
Arkansas	Benjamin T. Laney	Democratic	1944	Incumbent re-elected.	▌ ✓ Benjamin T. Laney (Democratic) 84.1%; ▌ W.T. Mills (Republican) 15.9%
California	Earl Warren	Republican	1942	Incumbent re-elected.	▌ ✓ Earl Warren (Republican) 91.6%; ▌ Henry R. Schmidt (Prohibition) 7.1%; ▌ Archie Brown (write-in) (Communist) 0.9%; ▌ James Roosevelt (write-in) (Democratic) 0.1%; ▌ Robert W. Kenny (Independent) 0.06%; ▌ Albert Clark (Independent) 0.03%
Colorado	John Charles Vivian	Republican	1942	Incumbent retired. Democratic gain.	▌ ✓ William Lee Knous (Democratic) 52.1%; ▌ Leon E. Lavington (Republican) 47.9%
Connecticut	Raymond E. Baldwin	Republican	1942	Incumbent retired. Republican hold.	▌ ✓ James L. McConaughy (Republican) 54.4%; ▌ Charles Wilbert Snow (Democratic) 40.4%; ▌Jasper McLevy (Socialist) 4.8%; ▌Herman N. Simon (Socialist Labor) 0.5%
Georgia	Ellis Arnall	Democratic	1942	Incumbent term-limited. Democratic hold.	Primary results: ▌ ✓ Eugene Talmadge (Democratic) 42.96% (244); ▌ James V. Carmichael (Democratic) 45.3% (144); ▌ Eurith D. Rivers (Democratic) 10.04% (22); ▌ Hoke O'Kelley (Democratic) 1.7%; General election: ▌ ✓ Eugene Talmadge (Democratic) 98.5%; ▌ Herman Talmadge (write-in) (Democratic) 0.46%; ▌ James V. Carmichael (write-in) (Democratic) 0.46%; ▌ D. Talmadge Bowers (write-in) (Independent) 0.44%; ▌ Ellis Arnall (write-in) (Democratic) 0.08%
Idaho	Arnold Williams	Democratic	1945 (Note: Williams became governor in 1945 when predecessor (Charles C. Gossett) resigned.)	Incumbent lost re-election. Republican gain.	▌ ✓ C. A. Robins (Republican) 56.4%; ▌ Arnold Williams (Democratic) 43.6%
Iowa	Robert D. Blue	Republican	1944	Incumbent re-elected.	▌ ✓ Robert D. Blue (Republican) 57.4%; ▌ Frank Miles (Democratic) 42.1%; ▌E. P. Gabriel (Prohibition) 0.5%
Kansas	Andrew Frank Schoeppel	Republican	1942	Incumbent retired. Republican hold.	▌ ✓ Frank Carlson (Republican) 53.5%; ▌ Harry Hines Woodring (Democratic) 44.0%; ▌ David C. White (Prohibition) 2.2%; ▌ Harry Graber (Socialist) 0.3%
Maine	Horace Hildreth	Republican	1944	Incumbent re-elected.	▌ ✓ Horace Hildreth (Republican) 61.3%; ▌ F. Davis Clark (Democratic) 38.7%
Maryland	Herbert O'Conor	Democratic	1938	Incumbent retired. Democratic hold.	▌ ✓ William Preston Lane Jr. (Democratic) 54.7%; ▌ Theodore McKeldin (Republican) 45.3%
Massachusetts	Maurice J. Tobin	Democratic	1944	Incumbent lost re-election. Republican gain.	▌ ✓ Robert F. Bradford (Republican) 54.1%; ▌ Maurice J. Tobin (Democratic) 45.3%; ▌Horace I. Hillis (Socialist Labor) 0.4%; ▌Guy S. Williams (Prohibition) 0.1%
Michigan	Harry Kelly	Republican	1942	Incumbent retired. Republican hold.	▌ ✓ Kim Sigler (Republican) 60.3%; ▌ Murray Van Wagoner (Democratic) 38.7%; ▌Gordon Phillips (Prohibition) 0.7%; ▌James Sim (Socialist Labor) 0.3%
Minnesota	Edward J. Thye	Republican	1943 (Note: Thye became governor in 1943 after predecessor (Harold Stassen) resigned. He was re-elected in 1944.)	Incumbent retired. Republican hold.	▌ ✓ Luther Youngdahl (Republican) 59.0%; ▌ Harold H. Barker (DFL) 39.7%; ▌Rudolph Gustafson (Industrial Government) 1.3%
Nebraska	Dwight Griswold	Republican	1940	Incumbent retired. Republican hold.	▌ ✓ Val Peterson (Republican) 65.5%; ▌ Frank Sorrell (Democratic) 35.5%
Nevada	Vail Pittman	Democratic	1945 (Note: Pittman became governor in 1945 when predecessor (Edward P. Carville) resigned.)	Incumbent re-elected.	▌ ✓ Vail Pittman (Democratic) 57.4%; ▌ Melvin E. Jepson (Republican) 42.6%
New Hampshire	Charles M. Dale	Republican	1944	Incumbent re-elected.	▌ ✓ Charles M. Dale (Republican) 63.1%; ▌ F. Clyde Keefe (Democratic) 36.9%
New Jersey	Walter E. Edge	Republican	1916; 1943	Incumbent retired. Republican hold.	▌ ✓ Alfred E. Driscoll (Republican) 57.1%; ▌ Lewis G. Hansen (Democratic) 41.4%
New Mexico	John J. Dempsey	Democratic	1942	Incumbent retired. Democratic hold.	▌ ✓ Thomas J. Mabry (Democratic) 52.7%; ▌ Edward L. Safford (Republican) 47.3%
New York	Thomas E. Dewey	Republican	1942	Incumbent re-elected.	▌ ✓ Thomas E. Dewey (Republican) 56.9%; ▌ James M. Mead (Democratic) 43.1%
North Dakota	Fred G. Aandahl	Republican	1944	Incumbent re-elected.	▌ ✓ Fred G. Aandahl (Republican) 68.9%; ▌ Quentin Burdick (Democratic) 31.1%
Ohio	Frank Lausche	Democratic	1944	Incumbent lost re-election. Republican gain.	▌ ✓ Thomas J. Herbert (Republican) 50.6%; ▌ Frank Lausche (Democratic) 48.9%; ▌Arla A. Albaugh (Socialist Labor) 0.5%
Oklahoma	Robert S. Kerr	Democratic	1942	Incumbent term-limited. Democratic hold.	▌ ✓ Roy J. Turner (Democratic) 52.5%; ▌ Olney F. Flynn (Republican) 46.0%; ▌ Mildred "Mickey" Harrell (Independent) 1.45%; ▌ R.M. Funk (Independent) 0.05%; ▌ Bruno H. Miller (Independent) 0.05%
Oregon	Earl Snell	Republican	1942	Incumbent re-elected.	▌ ✓ Earl Snell (Republican) 69.1%; ▌ Carl C. Donaugh (Democratic) 30.9%
Pennsylvania	Edward Martin	Republican	1942	Incumbent term-limited. Republican hold.	▌ ✓ James H. Duff (Republican) 58.5%; ▌ John S. Rice (Democratic) 40.7%; ▌ James Killip (Prohibition) 0.44%; ▌ George S. Taylor (Socialist Labor) 0.34%
Rhode Island	John Pastore	Democratic	1945 (Note: Pastore became governor in 1945 after predecessor (J. Howard McGrath) resigned.)	Incumbent elected to full term.	▌ ✓ John Pastore (Democratic) 54.3%; ▌ John G. Murphy (Republican) 45.7%
South Carolina	Ransome Judson Williams	Democratic	1945 (Note: Williams became governor in 1945, after predecessor (Olin D. Johnston) resigned.)	Incumbent lost renomination. Democratic hold.	Primary run-off: ▌ ✓ Strom Thurmond (Democratic) 56.95%; ▌ James C. McLeod (Democratic) 43.05%; General election: ▌ ✓ Strom Thurmond (Democratic)
South Dakota	Merrell Q. Sharpe	Republican	1942	Incumbent lost renomination. Republican hold.	▌ ✓ George T. Mickelson (Republican) 67.2%; ▌ Richard Haeder (Democratic) 32.8%
Tennessee	Jim Nance McCord	Democratic	1944	Incumbent re-elected.	▌ ✓ Jim Nance McCord (Democratic) 65.4%; ▌ W.O. Lowe (Republican) 31.9%; ▌ John Randolph Neal Jr. (Independent) 2.7%
Texas	Coke R. Stevenson	Democratic	1941 (Note: Stevenson became governor in 1941 after predecessor (W. Lee O'Daniel) resigned. He was re-elected in 1942 and 1944.)	Incumbent retired. Democratic hold.	▌ ✓ Beauford H. Jester (Democratic) 91.2%; ▌ Eugene Nolte (Republican) 8.8%
Vermont	Mortimer R. Proctor	Republican	1944	Incumbent lost renomination. Republican hold.	▌ ✓ Ernest W. Gibson Jr. (Republican) 80.3%; ▌ Berthold C. Coburn (Democratic) 19.6%
Wisconsin	Walter Samuel Goodland	Republican	1943 (Note: Goodland became governor in 1943 after governor-elect Orland Steen Loomis died before taking office. The Wisconsin Supreme Court ruled that as lieutenant governor, Goodland was next in the line of succession following the term of outgoing governor Julius P. Heil. He was re-elected in 1944.)	Incumbent re-elected.	▌ ✓ Walter Samuel Goodland (Republican) 59.8%; ▌Daniel Hoan (Democratic) 39.1%; ▌Walter H. Uphoff (Socialist) 0.9%; ▌Sigmund Eisenscher (Communist) 0.2%; ▌Jerry Kenyon (Socialist Labor) 0.1%
Wyoming	Lester C. Hunt	Democratic	1942	Incumbent re-elected.	▌ ✓ Lester C. Hunt (Democratic) 52.9%; ▌ Earl Wright (Republican) 47.1%

== Closest races ==
States where the margin of victory was under 5%:

1. Ohio, 1.76%
2. Colorado, 4.22%

States where the margin of victory was under 10%:

1. New Mexico, 5.64%
2. Wyoming, 5.76%
3. Oklahoma, 6.48%
4. Rhode Island, 8.54%
5. Massachusetts, 8.82%
6. Maryland, 9.46%
7. Kansas, 9.48%

Red denotes states won by Republicans. Blue denotes states won by Democrats.
