= James Shaver =

James Shaver may refer to:

- James D. Shaver (1861–1951), American politician and judge from Arkansas
- James L. Shaver (1902–1985), lieutenant governor of Arkansas, 1943–1947
- James L. Shaver Jr. (1927–2021), member of the Arkansas House of Representatives
- James W. Shaver (fl. 1860s), steam boat captain and founder of the Shaver Transportation Company
