= 1944 Arkansas gubernatorial election =

- November 7, 1944
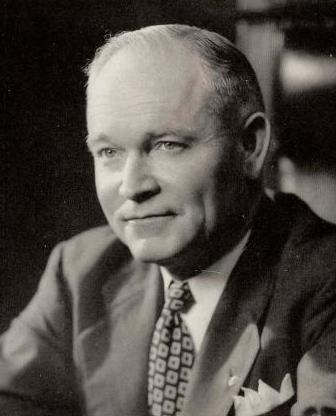

| Nominee | Benjamin Travis Laney | Harley C. Stump |
| Party | Democratic | Republican |
| Popular vote | 186,401 | 30,442 |
| Percentage | 85.96% | 14.04% |
- County results Laney: 60–70% 70–80% 80–90% >90% Stump: 50–60%
Governor before election
Homer Martin Adkins
Democratic
Elected Governor
Benjamin Travis Laney
Democratic

The 1944 Arkansas gubernatorial election was held on November 7, 1944.

Incumbent Democratic Governor Homer Martin Adkins did not seek a third term, instead running unsuccessfully for the U.S. Senate.

Democratic nominee Benjamin Travis Laney defeated Republican nominee Harley C. Stump with 85.96% of the vote.

== Democratic primary ==
The Democratic primary election was held on July 25, 1944, with the Democratic runoff scheduled for August 8, 1944 if no candidate won over 50% of the vote.

=== Candidates ===
- Benjamin Travis Laney, businessman and former mayor of Camden
- J. Bryan Sims, former State Comptroller
- David D. Terry, former U.S. Representative

=== Results ===
Results map of the Democratic primary by county. Laney: 30–40% 40–50% 50–60% 60–70% 70–80% 80–90% Sims: 30–40% 40–50% 50–60% 60–70% 70–80% 80–90% Terry: 30–40% 40–50% 50–60%

Democratic primary results
| Party | Candidate | Votes | % |
|---|---|---|---|
| Democratic | Benjamin Travis Laney | 70,965 | 38.55 |
| Democratic | J. Bryan Sims | 63,434 | 34.46 |
| Democratic | David D. Terry | 49,685 | 26.99 |
| Total votes | | 184,084 | 100.00 |

Sims withdrew from a runoff, and Laney became the Democratic nominee.

== General election ==
=== Candidates ===
- Benjamin Travis Laney, Democratic
- Harley C. Stump, Republican, Mayor of Stuttgart and candidate for Governor in 1940

=== Results ===
1944 Arkansas gubernatorial election
| Party | Candidate | Votes | % | ±% |
|---|---|---|---|---|
| Democratic | Benjamin Travis Laney | 186,401 | 85.96% | −14.04% |
| Republican | Harley C. Stump | 30,442 | 14.04% | N/A |
| Majority | | 155,959 | 71.92% | |
| Turnout | | 216,843 | 100.00% | |
| Democratic hold | | Swing | | |

== Bibliography ==
- Gubernatorial Elections, 1787-1997. Washington, D.C.: Congressional Quarterly Inc. 1998. ISBN 1-56802-396-0.
- Glashan, Roy R. (1979). American Governors and Gubernatorial Elections, 1775-1978. Meckler Books. ISBN 0-930466-17-9.
