= Robert J. T. White =

American politician

Robert J. T. White served as Secretary of State of Arkansas from 1864-1871. His former home in Little Rock, Arkansas, the White-Baucum House, is listed on the National Register of Historic Places. He was a Republican. He reported on improvements at the Arkansas Capitol building in 1866 after the American Civil War. He served as provisional Arkansas Secretary of State in Arkansas from January 24 - April 19, 1864 and also served as a clerk of the federal court in Little Rock in 1864 and 1865.

Powell Clayton was governor during White's term as Arkansas Secretary of State. White was succeeded as Arkansas Secretary of State by J. M. Johnson who had been Lieutenant Governor of Arkansas.

== See also ==
- Reconstruction era
