= 1946 United States elections =

- ← 1944 1945 1946 1947 1948 → Midterm elections
- Election day: November 5
- Incumbent president: ▌Harry S. Truman (D)
- Next Congress: 80th

Senate elections
- Overall control: Republican gain
- Seats contested: 37 of 96 seats (32 Class 1 seats + 8 special elections)
- Net seat change: Republican +12
- 1946 Senate election results Democratic gain Democratic hold Republican gain Republican hold

House elections
- Overall control: Republican gain
- Seats contested: All 435 voting seats
- Popular vote margin: Republican +8.5%
- Net seat change: Republican +55
- 1946 House election results Democratic gain Democratic hold Republican gain Republican hold

Gubernatorial elections
- Seats contested: 34
- Net seat change: Republican +3
- 1946 gubernatorial election results Democratic gain Democratic hold Republican gain Republican hold

Elections were held on November 5, 1946, and elected the members of the 80th United States Congress. In the first election taking place in the aftermath of World War II, the Democratic Party of incumbent President Harry S. Truman (who took office on April 12, 1945, upon the death of Franklin D. Roosevelt) suffered large losses to the Republican Party. After having been in the minority of both the House of Representatives and the Senate since 1932, the Republicans took control of both chambers.

This Republican wave reflected a public backlash against President Truman over post-war economic hardships (including the Recession of 1945), worsening relations with the Soviet Union, and Truman's handling of the United Auto Workers strike. Afterwards, Truman was widely expected to lose the 1948 United States presidential election, though he ultimately managed an upset victory over Republican Thomas E. Dewey.

== Results ==
=== House of Representatives ===
Democrats lost fifty-four seats to the Republican Party in the House of Representatives, and Democrats also lost eleven seats to the Republicans in the U.S. Senate, allowing Republicans to take control of both chambers. A Progressive also lost a seat to a Republican.

In California, newcomer Richard Nixon defeated incumbent Democrat Jerry Voorhis. Nixon campaigned on such issues as price controls, housing, and labor-management relations, but gained his greatest publicity from attacks on Voorhis left-wing associations and policies.

Another future US president, John F. Kennedy of Massachusetts, was also first elected to the House in this election.

=== Senate ===
In Mississippi, Senator Theodore G. Bilbo sought reelection to a third six-year term in the Democratic primary. He was under daily newspaper attack from Hodding Carter, one of the state's best-known political journalists and editors. Carter supported racial segregation but was a moderate on civil rights. His 1946 Pulitzer Prize for editorials on racial and religious tolerance as editor of the Greenville Delta Democrat Times had won him a national reputation. Bilbo narrowly won reelection with only 51% of the vote, but he died within a year.

In Georgia, white supremacy was the main theme as Eugene Talmadge was elected to a fourth term as governor. He had promoted purges of blacks from the voting lists in certain key Georgia counties.

== Long term ==
The election stymied Truman's efforts to enact his Fair Deal policies and helped ensure the passage of the Taft–Hartley Act over his veto. However, Truman was still able to implement the Marshall Plan, the National Security Act of 1947, and other Cold War policies. Thomas E. Dewey's re-election as Governor of New York helped him earn the 1948 Republican nomination for president. Joseph McCarthy also won election as Senator from Wisconsin in 1946.

== See also ==
- 1946 United States House of Representatives elections
- 1946 United States Senate elections
- 1946 United States gubernatorial elections
