= 1940 Arkansas gubernatorial election =

- November 5, 1940
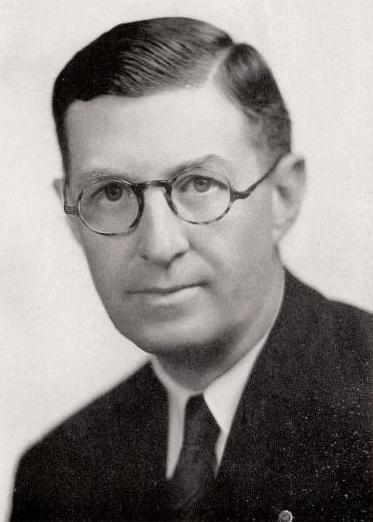

Nominee	Homer Adkins	Harley C. Stump
Party	Democratic	Republican
Popular vote	184,578	16,600
Percentage	91.36%	8.22%
- County results Adkins: 50–60% 60–70% 70–80% 80–90% >90%
Governor before election
Carl E. Bailey
Democratic
Elected Governor
Homer Martin Adkins
Democratic

The 1940 Arkansas gubernatorial election was held on November 5, 1940.

Incumbent Democratic Governor Carl E. Bailey was defeated in the Democratic primary.

Democratic nominee Homer Adkins defeated Republican nominee Harley C. Stump with 91.36% of the vote.

== Democratic primary ==
The Democratic primary election was held on August 13, 1940.

=== Candidates ===
The anti-Bailey "federal faction" coalesced around Homer Adkins in early 1940. Loathing the idea of turning the statehouse over to Adkins, Bailey decided to break Arkansas tradition and seek a third term.

==== Declared ====
- Homer Adkins, U.S. Internal Revenue collector for Arkansas
- Carl E. Bailey, incumbent Governor
- J. Rosser Venable, attorney
- Frank Witte, merchant

==== Declined ====
- Bob Bailey, Lieutenant Governor of Arkansas
- Jack Holt, Attorney General of Arkansas
- John L. McClellan, United States House of Representatives for Arkansas's 6th congressional district

=== Results ===
Democratic primary results
Party	Candidate	Votes	%
Democratic	Homer Adkins	142,247	55.93
Democratic	Carl E. Bailey (incumbent)	110,613	43.49
Democratic	Frank Witte	828	0.33
Democratic	J. Rosser Venable	653	0.26
Total votes		254,344	100.00

== General election ==
=== Candidates ===
- Homer Adkins, Democratic
- Harley C. Stump, mayor of Stuttgart. Stump was nominated at the Republican State Convention on May 11, 1940.
- Walter Scott McNutt, Independent, candidate for Governor in 1938

=== Results ===
1940 Arkansas gubernatorial election
Party	Candidate	Votes	%	±%
Democratic	Homer Adkins	184,578	91.36%	
Republican	Harley C. Stump	16,600	8.22%	
Independent	Walter S. McNutt	866	0.43%	
Majority		167,978	83.14%	
Turnout		202,044	100.00%	
Democratic hold		Swing		

== Bibliography ==
- Smith, C. Calvin (1995) [1981]. Donovon, Timothy P.; Gatewood Jr., Willard B.; Whayne, Jeannie M. (eds.). The Governors of Arkansas (2nd ed.). Fayetteville, Arkansas: University of Arkansas Press. ISBN 1-55728-331-1. LCCN 94-45806. OCLC 988572226.
- Gubernatorial Elections, 1787-1997. Washington, D.C.: Congressional Quarterly Inc. 1998. ISBN 1-56802-396-0.
- Glashan, Roy R. (1979). American Governors and Gubernatorial Elections, 1775-1978. Meckler Books. ISBN 0-930466-17-9.
