= 1942 Arkansas gubernatorial election =

1942 Arkansas Democratic gubernatorial primary
- November 3, 1942
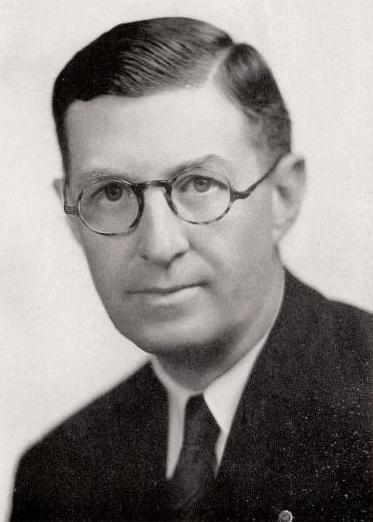

| Nominee | Homer Martin Adkins | Fred Keller |
| Party | Democratic | Democratic |
| Popular vote | 120,811 | 44,304 |
| Percentage | 71.75% | 26.31% |
- County results Adkins: 40–50% 50–60% 60–70% 70–80% 80–90% >90% Keller: 50–60% 70–80%
Governor before election
Homer Martin Adkins
Democratic
Elected Governor
Homer Martin Adkins
Democratic

The 1942 Arkansas gubernatorial election was held on November 3, 1942. Incumbent Democratic Governor Homer Martin Adkins was re-elected to a second term in office.

After winning the Democratic primary by a large margin over Fred Keller on July 28, Adkins won re-election to a second term without opposition in the general election.

== Democratic primary ==
=== Candidates ===
- Homer Adkins, incumbent Governor
- Fred Keller, educator
- Bill Neill, salesman
- Vernon Heath, real estate agent

=== Results ===
Democratic primary results
| Party | Candidate | Votes | % |
|---|---|---|---|
| Democratic | Homer Martin Adkins (incumbent) | 120,811 | 71.75 |
| Democratic | Fred Keller | 44,304 | 26.31 |
| Democratic | Bill Neill | 1,728 | 1.03 |
| Democratic | Vernon Heath | 1,524 | 0.91 |
| Total votes | | 168,367 | 100.00 |

== General election ==
=== Candidates ===
- Homer Martin Adkins, Democratic

The Republican Party did not offer a slate of candidates for state offices in 1942.

=== Results ===
1942 Arkansas gubernatorial election
| Party | Candidate | Votes | % | ±% |
|---|---|---|---|---|
| Democratic | Homer Martin Adkins (incumbent) | 98,871 | 100.00% | +8.64% |
| Turnout | | 98,871 | 100.00% | |
| Democratic hold | | Swing | | |

== Bibliography ==
- Gubernatorial Elections, 1787-1997. Washington, D.C.: Congressional Quarterly Inc. 1998. ISBN 1-56802-396-0.
- Glashan, Roy R. (1979). American Governors and Gubernatorial Elections, 1775-1978. Meckler Books. ISBN 0-930466-17-9.
