= Volney V. Smith =

American politician

3rd Lieutenant Governor of Arkansas
- In office 1873–1874
- Governor: Elisha Baxter
- Preceded by: James M. Johnson
- Succeeded by: Harvey Parnell (1927)

Personal details
- Born: Volney Voltaire Smith; September 28, 1841 New York
- Died: April 17, 1897 (aged 55) Lewisville, Arkansas
- Political party: Republican
- Spouse: Mary Jane (née Elliot)
- Profession: Soldier, politician

Volney Voltaire Smith (September 28, 1841 – April 17, 1897) was an American politician who served as the third lieutenant governor of Arkansas from 1873 to 1874. He served as president of the Arkansas Senate in 1873.

He served in the Union Army during the American Civil War including with a "colored" infantry unit.

He was a delegate to the Arkansas Constitutional Convention of 1874. He and other Republicans refused to sign the document produced. He made a claim to the governorship in waie of the Brooks-Baxter War but fled after an arrest warrant was sworn out for him and U.S. president Ulysses S. Grant chose not to intervene.

He was born in 1841 to Delazon Smith, a newspaper editor and Democratic Party politician, and Eliza Voke Smith. His second cousin was politician and mayor of Chelsea, Massachusetts Edward J. Voke.

He died in the state's mental institution.
