= Lloyd McCuiston =

American politician (1918–2021)

Lloyd C. McCuiston Jr.

Member of the Arkansas House of Representatives
- In office 1961–1994

Speaker of the Arkansas House of Representatives
- In office 1981–1983
- Preceded by: John E. Miller
- Succeeded by: John Paul Capps

Personal details
- Born: March 26, 1918 Memphis, Tennessee, U.S.
- Died: November 9, 2021 (aged 103) Memphis, Tennessee, U.S.
- Party: Democratic

Lloyd Carlisle McCuiston Jr. (March 26, 1918 – November 9, 2021) was an American politician. He was a member of the Arkansas House of Representatives, serving from 1961 to 1994. He was a member of the Democratic party. McCuiston was also a veteran of World War II, having served in the US Navy. In February 2018, McCuiston appeared in the Arkansas House of Representatives alongside eight other former Speakers.

He turned 100 in March 2018 and died in Memphis on November 9, 2021, at the age of 103.
