= Robert B. Bailey =

8th lieutenant governor of Arkansas

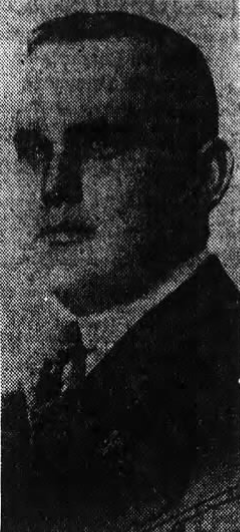

8th Lieutenant Governor of Arkansas
- In office January 12, 1937 – January 12, 1943
- Governor: Carl E. Bailey
- Preceded by: Lee Cazort
- Succeeded by: James L. Shaver

President of the Arkansas Senate
- In office January 12, 1925 – January 10, 1927
- Preceded by: Jake Wilson
- Succeeded by: Lee Cazort

Member of the Arkansas Senate from the Fourth district
- In office January 12, 1931 – January 14, 1935
- Preceded by: Paul McKennon
- Succeeded by: Armil Taylor
- In office January 8, 1923 – January 10, 1927
- Preceded by: Lee Cazort
- Succeeded by: Paul McKennon

Personal details
- Born: August 7, 1889 Knott County, Kentucky
- Died: December 23, 1957 (aged 68) Russellville, Arkansas
- Resting place: Oakland Cemetery; Russellville, Arkansas
- Spouse: Sibyl Bailey (née Craig)
- Education: Kentucky Wesleyan College; University of Michigan
- Profession: Lawyer, politician

Robert Ballard "Bob" Bailey (August 7, 1892 – December 23, 1957) was a lawyer and Democratic politician from Russellville, Arkansas. Winning a seat in the Arkansas Senate in 1923, he represented the Fourth District (Johnson and Pope counties) for eight of the next twelve years. Following ten years in private practice, Bailey was elected the eighth lieutenant governor of Arkansas in 1936, serving three two-year terms. As lieutenant governor, Bailey often served as acting governor when the governor was out of state.

== Political career ==
Bailey served as lieutenant governor under Carl E. Bailey as well as Governor Homer M. Adkins' first lieutenant governor.

Political offices
Preceded by Lee Cazort	Lieutenant Governor of Arkansas; 1937–1943	Succeeded by James L. Shaver
