= James M. Johnson (politician) =

American politician

Colonel James M. Johnson
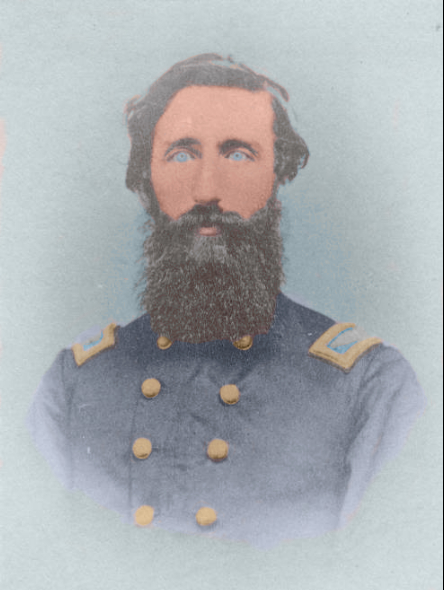
- Johnson during the Civil War

2nd Lieutenant Governor of Arkansas
- In office 1868–1871
- Governor: Powell Clayton
- Preceded by: Calvin C. Bliss
- Succeeded by: Volney V. Smith

10th Secretary of State of Arkansas
- In office 1871–1874
- Governor: Ozra Amander Hadley; Elisha Baxter
- Preceded by: Robert J. T. White
- Succeeded by: Benton B. Beavers

Personal details
- Born: December 8, 1832 Warren County, Tennessee, U.S.
- Died: February 15, 1913 (aged 80) Madison County, Arkansas, U.S.
- Party: Liberal Republican/Brindle Tail
- Spouse(s): Elizabeth Johnson (m. 1850; died 1883); Jennie A. Mullins (m.1893)
- Children: 8
- Profession: Farmer, Physician, Soldier, Politician

Military service
- Allegiance: United States
- Branch/service: United States Volunteers
- Years of service: 1863-65
- Rank: Colonel; Bvt. Brigadier General
- Commands: 1st Arkansas Infantry Regiment; 1st Brigade, 3rd Division, VII Corps; Department of Arkansas
- Battles/wars: American Civil War: Battle of Cotton Plant; Skirmish at Perryville; Battle of Fort Smith; Scout from Waldron to Mt. Ida, Caddo Gap and Dallas Ark; Battle of Fort Pillow

James M. Johnson (December 8, 1832 – February 15, 1913) was an American soldier and Arkansas politician. During the American Civil War he was a southern unionist and officer in the Union Army; serving as an aide to multiple generals and later commanded the 1st Arkansas Infantry Regiment (Union), eventually being made a brevet brigadier general. Following the war he would become the second lieutenant governor of Arkansas and later the tenth secretary of State of Arkansas. During his tenure in Arkansas politics Johnson formed his own faction in the Arkansas Republican Party, which went against the policies of Governor Powell Clayton. The two men later tried to impeach the other on trumped up charges. Though Johnson was never convicted he lost his political support and left politics.

== Early life and education ==
James Madison Johnson was born in Warren County, Tennessee, on December 8, 1832. In 1836 his family moved to Madison county, Arkansas. Johnson most likely received his early education in home as the first two schools of note in Northwest Arkansas were the Ozark institute and Arkansas College, which opened in 1845 and 1850 respectively. Johnson would later enroll in both schools. Arkansas College was the first charted school in Arkansas where students could obtain a doctor degree but it is unknown if Johnson ever completed the course. While at the Ozark Institute he may have met and befriended Isaac Murphy, who was a teacher and Arkansas state representative. Following school he became farmer until 1855 when he switched to learning medicine at Fayetteville. In 1857 he enrolled at St. Louis School of Medicine where he studied under Doctors Stevenson and Van-hoose. 1859 Johnson returned to Arkansas where he opened his own medical practice in Huntsville, Arkansas, that lasted until 1862.

== Civil War ==
Johnson was a known Unionist and he, along with his brother Frank and fellow Unionist Isaac Murphy, joined the Union army that was under the command of General Samuel Curtis in Missouri. The three men left Huntsville on the morning of April 7, 1862, and proceeded to Keitsville, Missouri. Many Unionists in the state were becoming increasingly harassed and in the case of the Arkansas Peace Society were forced to enlist in the Confederate army or face imprisonment. Due to this, many Arkansas Unionists fled the state, as did Johnson and while serving in the Union army sent his wife and children to live in Alton, Illinois, thanks to money given to him by Murphy. His family remained there for the duration of the Civil War and later returned to Arkansas in 1866.

After arriving in Missouri he and his brother both offered their services to General Curtis. Johnson became a mail agent and marched with the Union army to Helena. Johnson later served as a volunteer aide to the staff of General Schofield, commander of the Army of the Frontier. In November 1862 he was given the authority by General Schofield to raise a regiment of loyal Arkansas troops. Upon receiving the order, he marched with the army during the Prairie Grove campaign. He opened up a recruiting office in Fayetteville.

=== Huntsville Massacre ===
Before his regiment was mustered into service, Johnson and his brother, Frank, had returned to Huntsville in order to aide the army in identifying Confederate sympathizers. In November, Frank, along with 25 other soldiers, was tasked with escorting Issac Murphys daughters back to Huntsville. Upon the daughter's arrival Frank and his men began their journey back to Elkhorn Tavern. The daughters were met by a group of confederates in Huntsville that demanded to know the size of their federal escort. The daughters were eventually forced to comply and with a force much greater than Franks the confederates attacked and killed over half of the detachment. Frank, along with the 6 other survivors, returned to Elkhorn Tavern and informed the army of the attack. This was not the last time the Murphy daughters would be harassed or threatened. Following the Battle of Prairie Grove, union troops occupied Huntsville, including the Johnsons. Johnson and Frank both knew of a few in town that supported the Confederacy and gave their names to the Union forces. On January 10, 1863, 10 men who had been arrested for harassing Murphy's daughters, were taken a mile out of town and were executed by Company G of the 8th Regiment Missouri Volunteer Cavalry. Two men survived the executions and one of them, Bill Parks, shortly after the massacre claimed: "Men of the 8th Missouri Regiment. But Johnson, Ham and Murphy had it done." Parks succumbed to his wounds in January of the following year. Little is known about whether Johnson had been a part of became known as the “Huntsville Massacre” but nonetheless he gave names of suspected sympathizers to the army.

=== Service as Colonel and Representative ===
The unit was organized on March 25, 1863, and designated the 1st Arkansas Infantry Regiment (Union). Johnson was mustered in as the regiment's colonel. The regiment suffered from a lack of equipment however and they were to remain at Fayetteville, where they were further trained. In April Johnson was called away to attend a military tribunal in St. Louis. During his absence Fayetteville was attacked by confederate forces on April 25. The 1st Arkansas, commanded by Lieutenant Colonel Searle, and the 1st Arkansas Cavalry successfully defended the town and forced the confederates to withdraw. The commander of Fayetteville, Colonel Harrison, decided to relocate the garrison across the border to Springfield, Missouri. Upon Johnsons return he again assumed command of the regiment and would lead them during their March into Indian territory and eventually the capture of Fort Smith in September. On October 1 he was placed in command of Fort Smith.

Johnson's political ambitions seem to begin on October 30, 1863, when Unionists assembled in Fort Smith for the purpose of establishing a new loyal state government. At this meeting Johnson was elected to represent western Arkansas in the U.S. Congress. Two years later in October 1865 he was elected to represent Arkansas's third congressional district. Although he was a Unionist, the US Congress denied any elected delegates from Confederate states from taking their seats. In his attempts to be recognized by Congress he was often called away from his regiment. In the winter of the same year Col. Johnson commanded a scouting expedition in Northwest Arkansas.

During his service he is also said to have participated in the Battle of Cotton Plant, and was at the massacre of Fort Pillow as well as numerous other engagements, including in Indian Territory.

On March 13, 1865, Johnson was awarded the title of brevet brigadier general. The Senate confirmed this position on April 10, 1867. Johnson commanded the first brigade, 3rd division of the VII Corps (Department of Arkansas) for the remainder of the war. He was mustered out of service with his regiment on August 10, 1865, at Fort Smith.

== Public office ==
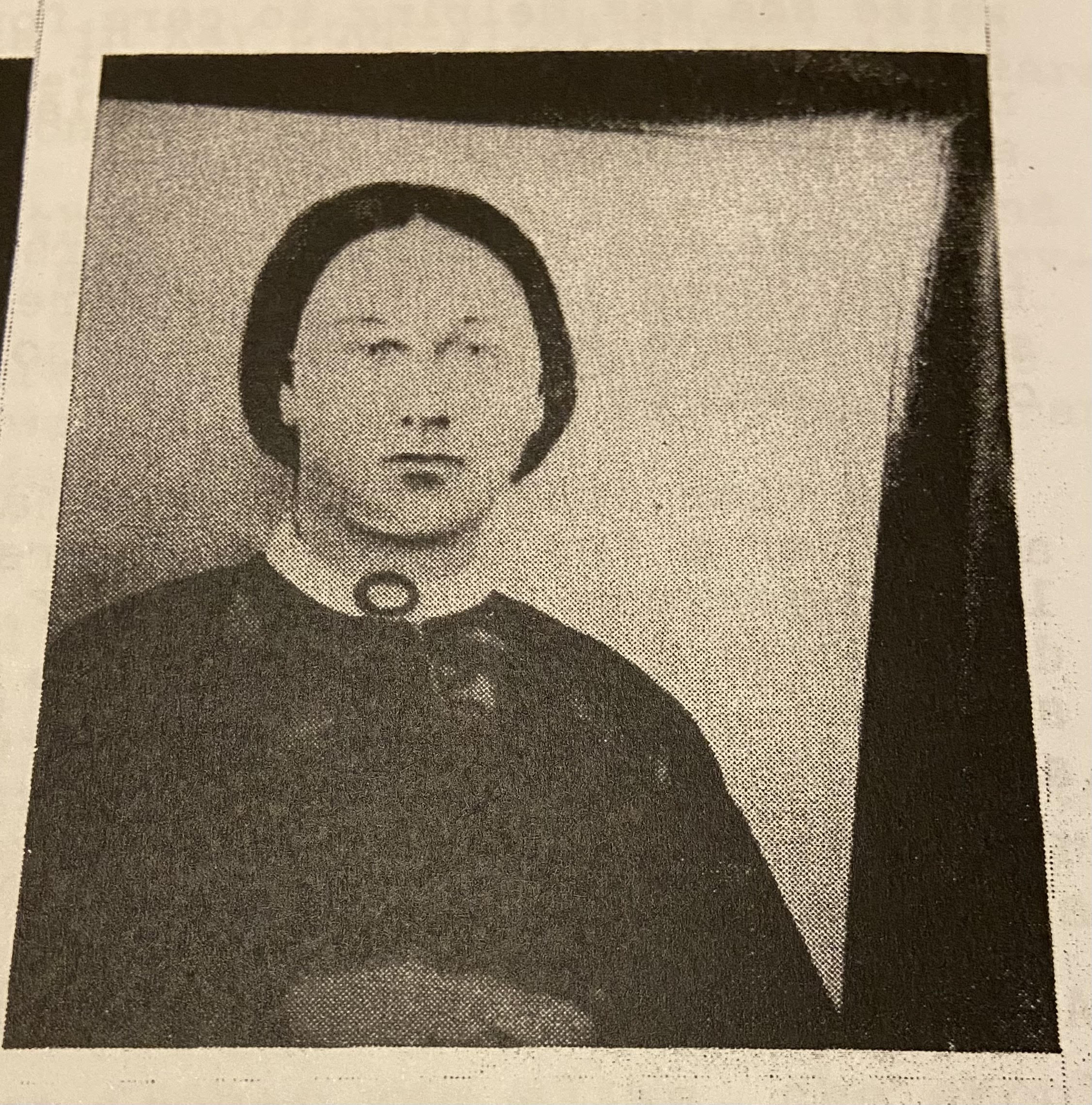
Johnson's first wife Elizabeth

=== Lieutenant Governor of Arkansas ===
Leading up to the first post-Civil War Arkansas elections, Johnson was seen by many unionist as being a candidate for governor. The nominations were close until, eventually, Carpetbagger and Union officer Powell Clayton won. In order to keep the Arkansas unionists happy Johnson was elected as Lieutenant-Governor. This would anger a large portion of former Arkansas unionists, many of whom were denied from taking office during the Civil War and they saw Johnson's snub as an extension of this. For now, however, the two sides agreed to work together.

The Clayton administration would galvanize many Arkansans unionists, including Johnson, with his use of the militia and martial law during a period known as the “militia wars”. The tension between the two would boil over in the summer of 1869 when Clayton left Arkansas for New York regarding the state's finances and the anti-Clayton forces seized on the opportunity to remove him. They sent for Johnson, who was in northwest Arkansas at the time, to head to Little Rock where he would then take over as acting Governor. This plan failed as Clayton would return before Johnson's arrival.

Following this affair Johnson attacked the Clayton administration as being corrupt and in October of the same year he would break off and form his own faction in the Arkansas Republican Party. This faction, known as the “Liberal Republicans”, were made up of mostly former Arkansas Unionists who opposed the Clayton administration. They would campaign to Democrats and conservatives on the basis of trying to remove a radical and northerner like Clayton from Arkansas. While acting as leader of the liberals Johnson was still lieutenant governor. This new faction was parallel to the split that occurred in the national Republican Party around the same time with one side supporting and the other denouncing the policies of President Grant.

In 1871, Clayton was elected to the United States Senate. If he accepted however this would mean his political enemy, Johnson, would assume the governorship. Clayton and his allies went through a few different avenues to get rid of Johnson, issuing a quo warranto, impeachment and even offering him a federal appointment as the minister to the Sandwich Islands but all of these failed. As if not to be outdone the liberals and brindle tails launched their own impeachment campaign against Clayton which failed similarly. By this point, both sides had used up most of their political ammunition and it became a matter of who would break first. It was Johnson. Clayton convinced the secretary of state of Arkansas, Robert White, to resign and then offered the position to Johnson which he accepted. With the situation resolved Clayton could then accept his senate seat. Johnson's reasons for accepting are not definitely known. Rumors circulated that Johnson had accepted a bribe of $15,000 to go along with Clayton's plan, but no firm evidence of this has ever been discovered. While this was cited in the press as the reason, his choice may have come down as an act of self-preservation. Johnson's reputation was no doubt damaged by his republican infighting and Joseph Brooks had by now replaced Johnson as leader of the anti-Clayton movement. Accepting Clayton's offer would at least mean he would walk away with something. Regardless of the truth however this would ultimately ruin Johnson's political career. His decision was seen as either a corrupt bargain or a bending of the knee towards Clayton by many of his former supporters. These were part of the events that lead to the Brooks-Baxter War. The year 1871 not only proved to be a disastrous for his political life but also a somber one for his personal life as his eldest child, Elizabeth ("Lizzie"), would die during complications with childbirth at the age of 19.

=== Secretary of State of Arkansas ===
Johnson would serve as secretary for the rest of White's term and was re-elected to the position in 1872. During his last year as secretary of state in 1874 the Brooks-Baxter War began. In its aftermath the Arkansas State House was severely damaged. He oversaw the cleaning and repair of the building for the remainder of his tenure. He never entered politics again.

== Later life ==
In 1874, Johnson accepted a position on the board of trustees for the University of Arkansas. He held this position until 1883. Johnson was also member of Masonic Fraternity. He moved into a log house in Wesley, Arkansas where he lived for the rest of his life. Johnson also continued to be a physician while his daughter, Kate, studied under him. On June 10, 1883, Elizabeth Johnson died. (Although some accounts claim her death to be on August 24, 1884, the date of death on her grave marker is June 1883) Johnson applied for his Civil War veterans pension in 1891. In 1893 Johnson would marry Jennie A. Mullins. She died on March 5, 1917.

== Personal life ==
=== Family ===
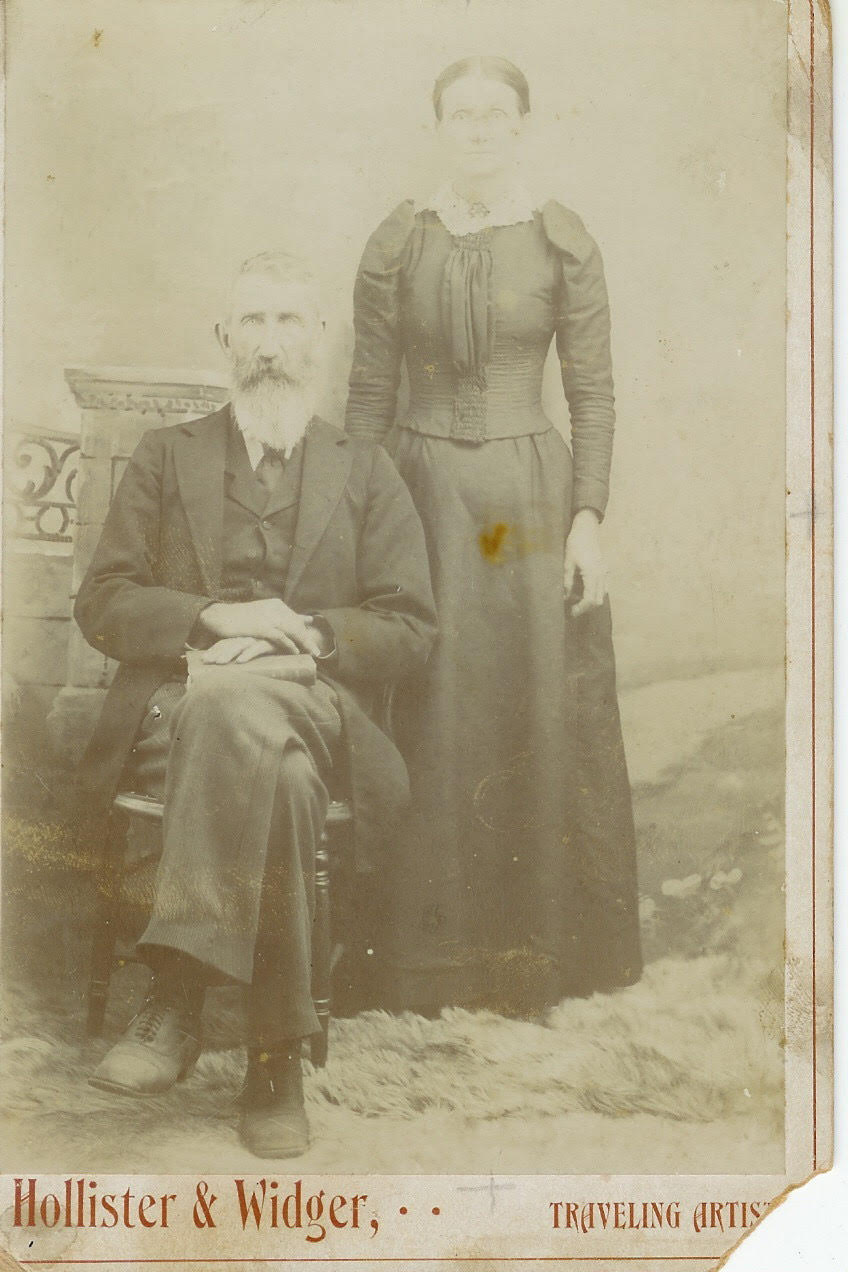
Johnson with his second wife Jennie.

Johnson was the only child to James Martin Johnson and Elizabeth Dungan. In 1831, his father remarried and would have 9 more children. His birth mother would die in 1853. On September 10, 1850, Johnson would marry his 2nd cousin, Elizabeth Johnson, and together they would have seven children, 2 daughters and 6 sons. Their last son, Lincoln Johnson, appears to have died at birth His wife died in 1883 at the age of 50. A decade later, on October 15, 1893, he married Jennie A. Mullins who became a widow after the death of her husband Benjamin Henderson Wilson, who had been a close friend of Johnson's.

=== Political views ===
How Johnson became a unionist is unknown. The most likely reason why is due to his family, many of which stayed loyal to the union. His father, a Republican, would enlist in company I, 1st Arkansas Union Cavalry in 1862. Two of Johnson's step brothers, Francis and Robert, would also enlist in Union regiments. Francis, known as “Frank”, would obtain the rank of major in the 1st Arkansas Union Infantry. Robert would serve in the 16th Kansas Cavalry until his death in 1865 while in Dakota Territory.

As to slavery, its likely at the very least Johnson did not care for it. Johnson grew up in northwest Arkansas, an area in which slavery was not common in daily life. He was also close friend of Isaac Murphy, who denounced slavery. Following the war Johnson became a Republican if he wasn't already.

All his political life Johnson was a scalawag, meaning he supported reconstruction under Republican rule but he was not a radical. In fact in many cases he found himself on the side of the conservative Democrats. He, or at the very least his faction, favored limiting the power of the governor and ending restrictions on voting for former confederates.

== Death ==
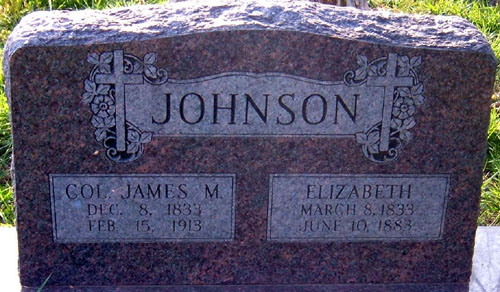
Tombstone of Johnson and his first wife Elizabeth

Johnson died on February 15, 1913, in Madison County, Arkansas at the age of 80. He is buried with his first wife at Colonel Johnson Cemetery in Wesley, Arkansas.

== See also ==
- List of American Civil War brevet generals (Union)
- List of lieutenant governors of Arkansas

Political offices
Preceded by Calvin Bliss	Lieutenant Governor of Arkansas; 1868–1871	Succeeded by Volney V. Smith
Preceded by Robert J. T. White	Secretary of State of Arkansas; 1871–1874	Succeeded by Benton B. Beavers
