= Calvin C. Bliss =

American politician

1st Lieutenant Governor of Arkansas
- In office 1864–1868
- Governor: Isaac Murphy
- Preceded by: Office established*
- Succeeded by: James M. Johnson

Delegate to the 1864 Arkansas State Constitutional Convention
- In office 1864

Personal details
- Born: December 22, 1823 Calais, Vermont, US
- Died: December 13, 1891 (aged 67) Arkansas, US

Calvin Comins Bliss (December 22, 1823 – December 13, 1891) was an American politician. He was the first lieutenant governor of Arkansas, serving from 1864 to 1868. He was one of the preparers of its 1864 constitution.

== Early life and move to Arkansas ==
Bliss was born on December 22, 1823 in Calais, Vermont, the eldest of four children of farmers William and Martha Bliss.

He matriculated at the Hamilton Literary and Theological Institution (now Colgate University) in Hamilton, New York, entering with the class of 1849 but departing in 1847—likely amid tensions over abolitionist activities at the school. After leaving the institution, he held diverse jobs in New York, Massachusetts and Connecticut.

In September 1854 he married Caroline “Carrie” Eastman in Bradford, Maine.

The next day the couple traveled to the Helena area of Arkansas, where they opened a school for young women. Bliss also served as a purchasing agent and entered real-estate work. After a few years they relocated to Batesville in Independence County where he became a land agent; the couple owned a fifty-six-acre farm and had three children.

== Civil War service and political ascendance ==
Despite the outbreak of the American Civil War and living as one of the few Union-loyal families in the Batesville region, Bliss remained active. In May 1862 Union forces under Samuel R. Curtis passed through Batesville; by late June the area reverted to Confederate control. Around this time Bliss joined the 1st Battalion, Arkansas Infantry (Union) (Company A), with mustering at Helena, Arkansas. His unit suffered heavy illness and little active combat, and was mustered out in St. Louis at the end of 1862."Battle Unit Details". National Park Service. By early 1864 Bliss was chosen as a delegate from Independence County to the Arkansas constitutional convention convened in Little Rock. At the convention the 1861 Confederate constitution was rejected and the 1836 constitution reinstated, with amendments abolishing slavery. After the March election he became the first lieutenant governor of Arkansas, serving under Governor Isaac Murphy from 1864 to 1868.In April 1864, Bliss entered the newspaper business in Little Rock, acquiring an interest in The True Democrat. By early 1865 he was publisher of the Unconditional Union.

== Postwar efforts, later life and death ==
After the Confederate surrender in April 1865, reuniting with his family became a priority: Bliss traveled to Maine in August to bring Carrie and the children back to Little Rock.

In 1866 he journeyed to Washington, D.C., on state business; while away a suspected arson destroyed the Unconditional Union office in Little Rock. He remained lieutenant governor until the state constitution of 1868.

Bliss advocated for former enslaved persons’ welfare, writing to the American & Foreign Bible Society to request Bibles and psalm-books. He continued efforts in real estate and publishing, though financial difficulties, particularly speculative real-estate losses, plagued his later years. His wife Carrie’s health deteriorated and she died on September 4, 1881 in Little Rock. The family later moved to the Sweet Home area in Pulaski County, where Bliss grew strawberries and taught school. He died of an apparent heart attack on December 13, 1891, and is interred in Oakland & Fraternal Cemetery in Little Rock. The interment appears in the cemetery’s indexed burial records (1891–1898).

Political offices
Preceded by office established	Lieutenant Governor of Arkansas; 1864–1868	Succeeded by James M. Johnson
