= Ben Laney Bridge =

- U.S. National Register of Historic Places
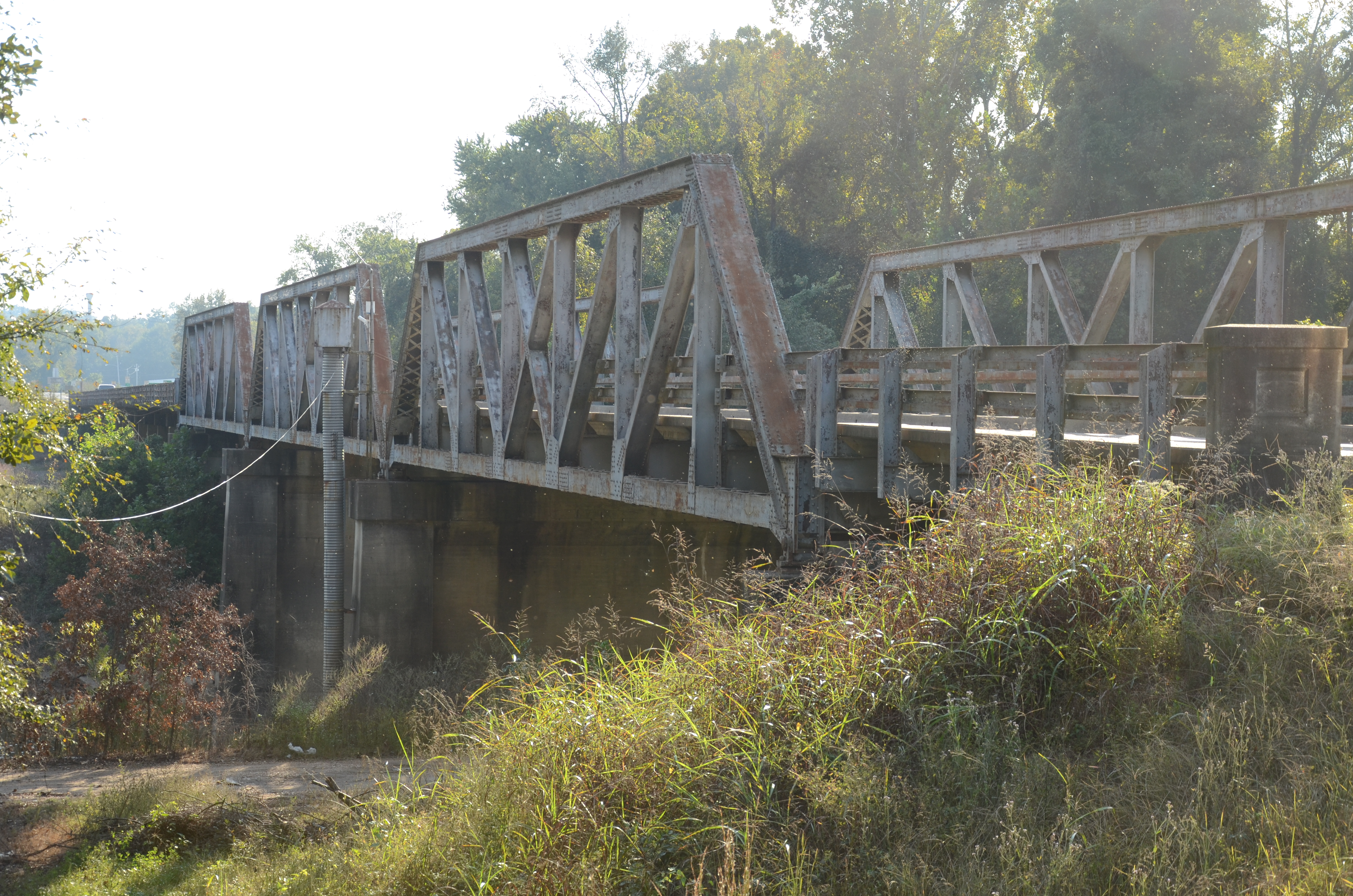

- Location within Arkansas Location within the United States
- Nearest city: US 79B, Camden, Arkansas
- Coordinates: 33°35′47″N 92°49′7″W
- Area: 1.4 acres (0.57 ha)
- Built: 1947
- Built by: D.F. Jones Construction Co.
- Architect: Arkansas Highway and Transportation Department
- Architectural style: Pratt pony truss
- MPS: Historic Bridges of Arkansas MPS
- NRHP reference No.: 00000633
- Added to NRHP: June 9, 2000

The Ben Laney Bridge is a historic bridge carrying U.S. Route 79 Business (US 79 Bus.) over the Ouachita River in Camden, Arkansas. The steel Pratt truss bridge was built in 1945–47, and dedicated to Acting Governor (and former Camden mayor) Benjamin Travis Laney. Its construction was delayed due to a shortage of steel. The bridge consists of three trusses with a total span of 129 feet (39 m), resting on reinforced concrete piers and abutments. The bridge also includes a 548-foot (167 m) approach of I-beam decking, which was built in 1934.

The bridge was listed on the National Register of Historic Places in 2000.

== See also ==
- National Register of Historic Places listings in Ouachita County, Arkansas
- List of bridges on the National Register of Historic Places in Arkansas
