= John Eldon Miller =

American politician

John E. Miller
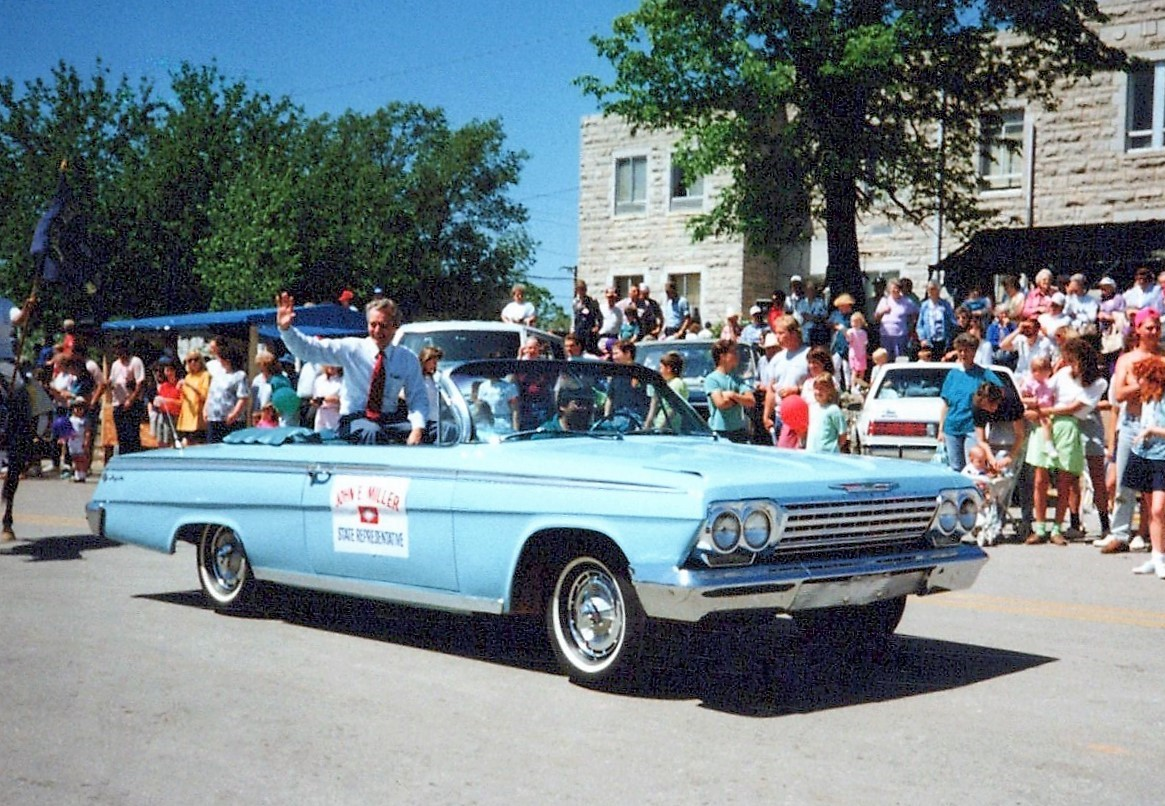

Member of the Arkansas House of Representatives
- In office 1959–1998

Speaker of the Arkansas House of Representatives
- In office 1979–1981
- Preceded by: James L. Shaver, Jr.
- Succeeded by: Lloyd McCuiston

Personal details
- Born: John Eldon Miller; March 2, 1929 Melbourne, Arkansas, U.S.
- Died: June 18, 2014 (aged 85) Melbourne, Arkansas, U.S.
- Party: Democratic

John Eldon Miller (March 2, 1929 – June 18, 2014) was an American politician and businessman. A Democrat, he served in the Arkansas House of Representatives including as Speaker of the Arkansas House of Representatives in 1979.

Born in Melbourne, Arkansas, Miller received his bachelor's degree in chemistry from Arkansas State University. He worked in real estate, retail business, title abstract, and insurance. He served in the Arkansas House of Representatives including as speaker. He died in Melbourne, Arkansas.
