= Lieutenant Governor of Arkansas =

Second-highest elected office in Arkansas

- State seal

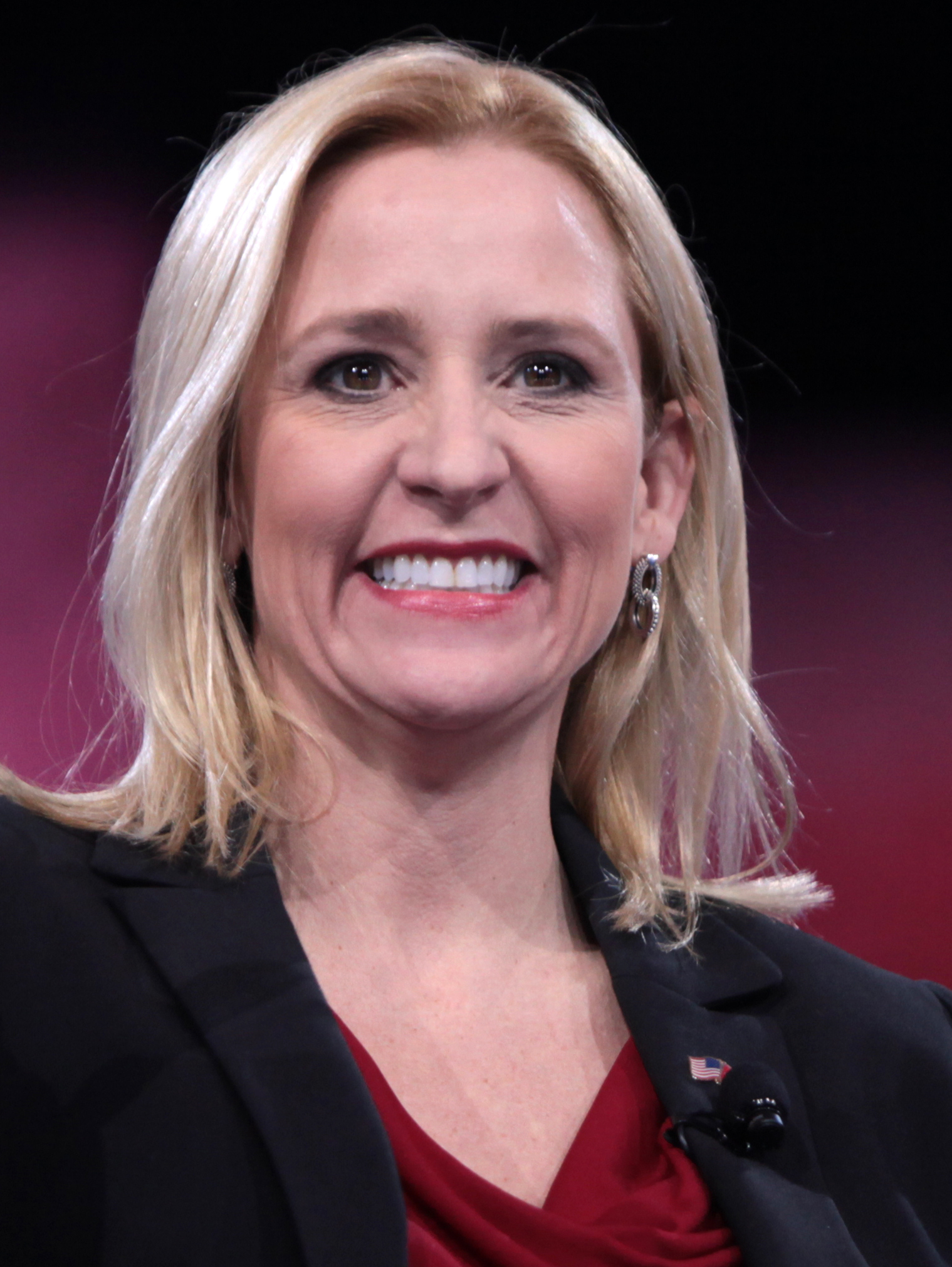
- Incumbent; Leslie Rutledge since January 10, 2023
- Government of Arkansas
- Seat: State Capitol, Little Rock, Arkansas
- Term length: Four years, renewable once
- Constituting instrument: Constitution of Arkansas
- Inaugural holder: Calvin C. Bliss
- Formation: April 18, 1864 (162 years ago)
- Succession: First
- Website: ltgovernor.arkansas.gov

The lieutenant governor of Arkansas is the second-highest constitutional and elected office in the U.S. state of Arkansas. The lieutenant governor is the first in the gubernatorial line of succession, assuming the governorship in cases of the governor's impeachment, removal from office, death or inability to discharge the office's duties. The lieutenant governor also serves as president of the Arkansas Senate, with a tie-breaking vote. The lieutenant governor is elected separately from the governor.

The position of lieutenant governor was created by the Sixth Amendment to the Arkansas Constitution in 1914, but was not filled until 1927. The amendment was approved by the electorate in 1914, with returns showing 45,567 in favor and 45,206 opposed. The speaker of the House declared the measure lost because it had not received a majority of the highest total vote, which was 135,517. In 1925, it was discovered that the Initiative and Referendum of 1910 had amended this majority requirement so that only a majority of those voting on a specific question was required. So, in 1926, the 1914 initiative was declared to be valid and Harvey Parnell was elected Arkansas' first lieutenant governor.

Two recent incumbents, Winthrop Paul Rockefeller and Mike Huckabee, began their respective tenures in the midst of regular term periods, due to the elevation of their predecessors to the governorship. Jim Guy Tucker succeeded Bill Clinton as governor in December 1992, upon Clinton's resignation days before assuming his office as President of the United States, creating the need for a special election to fill the lieutenant governor's office. When Tucker was convicted of conspiracy and mail fraud charges in 1996, Huckabee succeeded him as governor, paving the way for the November 1996 special election of Rockefeller as lieutenant governor.

The current lieutenant governor is Leslie Rutledge, since January 10, 2023.

== History ==
The U.S. state of Arkansas had no office of lieutenant governor under its original constitution. Amidst the American Civil War in 1864, a new constitution was ratified and a pro-Union government was installed which included a lieutenant governor to be, like several other state officials, popularly elected to serve four-year terms. Calvin C. Bliss was the first person to hold the office. The position was preserved in the new constitution ratified by the state in 1868, but eliminated in the constitution of 1874.

In 1914, an amendment to the constitution to reestablish the office of lieutenant governor was subject to a popular referendum. While the item received more affirmative than negative votes, the Arkansas Supreme Court held that only a majority of the votes of all the citizens who had participated in that year's referendums could constitute a passing margin. In 1925, the court reversed its decision, ruling that the office be filled in the state elections occurring in 1926. Harvey Parnell was subsequently elected to the office.

Under Nathan Green Gordon's 20 year-tenure, the lieutenant governorship assumed great influence in the State Senate, with the officer able to set the body's calendar, assign members to committees, and refer bills to committees. Upon Gordon's succession by Republican Maurice Britt in 1967, the Democratic-dominated Senate removed much of the office's powers. The lieutenant governor held office for a term of two years until 1986, when the term was expanded to four years. The constitution was amended in 1992 to provide for term limits. From the office's recreation in 1926 until a constitutional amendment ratified in 2016, the lieutenant governor served as acting governor when the governor was traveling out of the state; the amendment allowed the governor to retain their powers while absent. The first woman to hold the office, Leslie Rutledge, was sworn in on January 10, 2023.

== Powers, duties, and structure ==
The lieutenant governor is one of seven executive constitutional officers in the state of Arkansas. The main responsibilities of the lieutenant governor are to serve as the president of the Arkansas Senate and to succeed to the governorship should it become vacant. They are constitutionally restricted to serving a maximum of two terms.

The lieutenant governor keeps an office in the Arkansas State Capitol. They collect an annual salary of $48,105.

== List of officeholders ==
Lieutenant governors of the State of Arkansas
No.	Lieutenant Governor	Term in office	Party	Election	Governor (Note: Lieutenant governors represented the same party as their governor unless noted.)
1	Calvin C. Bliss (1823–1891)	April 18, 1864 – July 2, 1868 (did not run)	Republican	1864	Isaac Murphy
2	James M. Johnson (1832–1913)	July 2, 1868 – March 14, 1871 (resigned) (Note: Clayton resigned from the governorship, having been elected to the United States Senate. He had delayed his resignation to prevent Johnson from succeeding him; party machinations led to Johnson's resignation and acceptance of the office of secretary of state, so that Hadley, as president pro tempore of the senate, could act as governor for the remainder of the term.)	Republican	1868	Powell Clayton (resigned March 17, 1871)
—	Office vacant from March 14, 1871 - January 6, 1873		Office vacated by resignation		Powell Clayton (resigned March 17, 1871)
—	Office vacant from March 14, 1871 - January 6, 1873		Office vacated by resignation		Ozra Amander Hadley
3	Volney V. Smith (1841–1897)	January 6, 1873 – November 12, 1874 (office abolished)	Republican	1872	Elisha Baxter
Office did not exist from November 12, 1874, to January 11, 1927
4	Harvey Parnell (1880–1936)	January 11, 1927 – March 14, 1928 (succeeded to governor)	Democratic	1926	John Ellis Martineau (resigned March 14, 1928)
—	Office vacant from March 4, 1928 - January 14, 1929		Office vacated by succession to governor		Harvey Parnell
5	Lee Cazort (1887–1969)	January 14, 1929 – January 12, 1931 (did not run) (Note: Cazort instead ran unsuccessfully for the Democratic nomination for governor.)	Democratic	1928	Harvey Parnell
6	Lawrence Elery Wilson (1884–1946)	January 12, 1931 – January 10, 1933 (lost nomination)	Democratic	1930	Harvey Parnell
7	Lee Cazort (1887–1969)	January 10, 1933 – January 12, 1937 (did not run) (Note: Cazort instead ran unsuccessfully for the Democratic nomination for governor.)	Democratic	1932	Junius Marion Futrell
7	Lee Cazort (1887–1969)	January 10, 1933 – January 12, 1937 (did not run)	Democratic	1934	Junius Marion Futrell
8	Robert B. Bailey (1892–1957)	January 12, 1937 – January 12, 1943 (did not run)	Democratic	1936	Carl Edward Bailey
8	Robert B. Bailey (1892–1957)	January 12, 1937 – January 12, 1943 (did not run)	Democratic	1938	Carl Edward Bailey
8	Robert B. Bailey (1892–1957)	January 12, 1937 – January 12, 1943 (did not run)	Democratic	1940	Homer Martin Adkins
9	James L. Shaver (1902–1985)	January 12, 1943 – January 14, 1947 (did not run)	Democratic	1942	Homer Martin Adkins
9	James L. Shaver (1902–1985)	January 12, 1943 – January 14, 1947 (did not run)	Democratic	1944	Benjamin Travis Laney
10	Nathan Green Gordon (1916–2008)	January 14, 1947 – January 10, 1967 (did not run)	Democratic	1946	Benjamin Travis Laney
10	Nathan Green Gordon (1916–2008)	January 14, 1947 – January 10, 1967 (did not run)	Democratic	1948	Sid McMath
10	Nathan Green Gordon (1916–2008)	January 14, 1947 – January 10, 1967 (did not run)	Democratic	1950	Sid McMath
10	Nathan Green Gordon (1916–2008)	January 14, 1947 – January 10, 1967 (did not run)	Democratic	1952	Francis Cherry
10	Nathan Green Gordon (1916–2008)	January 14, 1947 – January 10, 1967 (did not run)	Democratic	1954	Orval Faubus
10	Nathan Green Gordon (1916–2008)	January 14, 1947 – January 10, 1967 (did not run)	Democratic	1956	Orval Faubus
10	Nathan Green Gordon (1916–2008)	January 14, 1947 – January 10, 1967 (did not run)	Democratic	1958	Orval Faubus
10	Nathan Green Gordon (1916–2008)	January 14, 1947 – January 10, 1967 (did not run)	Democratic	1960	Orval Faubus
10	Nathan Green Gordon (1916–2008)	January 14, 1947 – January 10, 1967 (did not run)	Democratic	1962	Orval Faubus
10	Nathan Green Gordon (1916–2008)	January 14, 1947 – January 10, 1967 (did not run)	Democratic	1964	Orval Faubus
11	Maurice Britt (1919–1995)	January 10, 1967 – January 12, 1971 (did not run)	Republican	1966	Winthrop Rockefeller
11	Maurice Britt (1919–1995)	January 10, 1967 – January 12, 1971 (did not run)	Republican	1968	Winthrop Rockefeller
12	Bob C. Riley (1924–1994)	January 12, 1971 – January 3, 1975 (succeeded to governor) (Note: Riley had not run for re-election, instead running unsuccessfully for the Democratic nomination for governor.)	Democratic	1970	Dale Bumpers (resigned January 3, 1975)
12	Bob C. Riley (1924–1994)	January 12, 1971 – January 3, 1975 (succeeded to governor)	Democratic	1972	Dale Bumpers (resigned January 3, 1975)
—	Office vacant from January 3–14, 1975		Office vacated by succession to governor		Bob C. Riley
13	Joe Purcell (1923–1987)	January 14, 1975 – January 3, 1979 (succeeded to governor) (Note: Purcell had already won re-election as lieutenant governor.)	Democratic	1974	David Pryor (resigned January 3, 1979)
13	Joe Purcell (1923–1987)	January 14, 1975 – January 3, 1979 (succeeded to governor)	Democratic	1976	David Pryor (resigned January 3, 1979)
—	Office vacant from January 3–9, 1979		Office vacated by succession to governor		Joe Purcell
13	Joe Purcell (1923–1987)	January 9, 1979 – January 19, 1981 (did not run)	Democratic	1978	Bill Clinton
14	Winston Bryant (b. 1938)	January 19, 1981 – January 15, 1991 (did not run) (Note: Bryant instead ran successfully for Attorney General of Arkansas.)	Democratic	1980	Frank D. White (Note: Represented the Republican Party.)
14	Winston Bryant (b. 1938)	January 19, 1981 – January 15, 1991 (did not run)	Democratic	1982	Bill Clinton (resigned December 12, 1992)
14	Winston Bryant (b. 1938)	January 19, 1981 – January 15, 1991 (did not run)	Democratic	1984	Bill Clinton (resigned December 12, 1992)
14	Winston Bryant (b. 1938)	January 19, 1981 – January 15, 1991 (did not run)	Democratic	1986	Bill Clinton (resigned December 12, 1992)
15	Jim Guy Tucker (1943–2025)	January 15, 1991 – December 12, 1992 (succeeded to governor)	Democratic	1990	Bill Clinton (resigned December 12, 1992)
—	Office vacant from December 12, 1992 - November 19, 1993		Office vacated by succession to governor		Jim Guy Tucker (Note: Represented the Democratic Party.) (resigned July 15, 1996)
16	Mike Huckabee (b. 1955)	November 20, 1993 – July 15, 1996 (succeeded to governor)	Republican	1993 (special)	Jim Guy Tucker (resigned July 15, 1996)
16	Mike Huckabee (b. 1955)	November 20, 1993 – July 15, 1996 (succeeded to governor)	Republican	1994	Jim Guy Tucker (resigned July 15, 1996)
—	Office vacant from July 15 - November 19, 1996		Office vacated by succession to governor		Mike Huckabee
17	Winthrop Paul Rockefeller (1948–2006)	November 19, 1996 – July 16, 2006 (died in office)	Republican	1996 (special)	Mike Huckabee
17	Winthrop Paul Rockefeller (1948–2006)	November 19, 1996 – July 16, 2006 (died in office)	Republican	1998	Mike Huckabee
17	Winthrop Paul Rockefeller (1948–2006)	November 19, 1996 – July 16, 2006 (died in office)	Republican	2002	Mike Huckabee
—	Office vacant from July 16, 2006 - January 9, 2007		Office vacated by death		Mike Huckabee
18	Bill Halter (b. 1960)	January 9, 2007 – January 11, 2011 (did not run) (Note: Halter instead ran unsuccessfully for the Democratic nomination to the United States Senate.)	Democratic	2006	Mike Beebe
19	Mark Darr (b. 1973)	January 11, 2011 – February 1, 2014 (resigned) (Note: Darr resigned; he was under sanction for ethics violations involving illegal use of campaign funds.)	Republican	2010	Mike Beebe
—	Office vacant from February 1, 2014 - January 13, 2015		Office vacated by resignation		Mike Beebe
20	Tim Griffin (b. 1968)	January 13, 2015 – January 10, 2023 (term-limited)	Republican	2014	Asa Hutchinson
20	Tim Griffin (b. 1968)	January 13, 2015 – January 10, 2023 (term-limited)	Republican	2018	Asa Hutchinson
21	Leslie Rutledge (b. 1976)	January 10, 2023 – Incumbent (Note: Rutledge's first term will expire January 12, 2027.)	Republican	2022	Sarah Huckabee Sanders

== Works cited ==
- Blair, Diane D.; Barth, Jay (2005). Arkansas Politics and Government (second ed.). Lincoln: University of Nebraska Press. ISBN 0-8032-6198-5.
- Goss, Kay Collett (2011). The Arkansas State Constitution. Oxford University Press. ISBN 9780199778966.
