= White-Baucum House =

Historic house in Arkansas, United States

- U.S. National Register of Historic Places
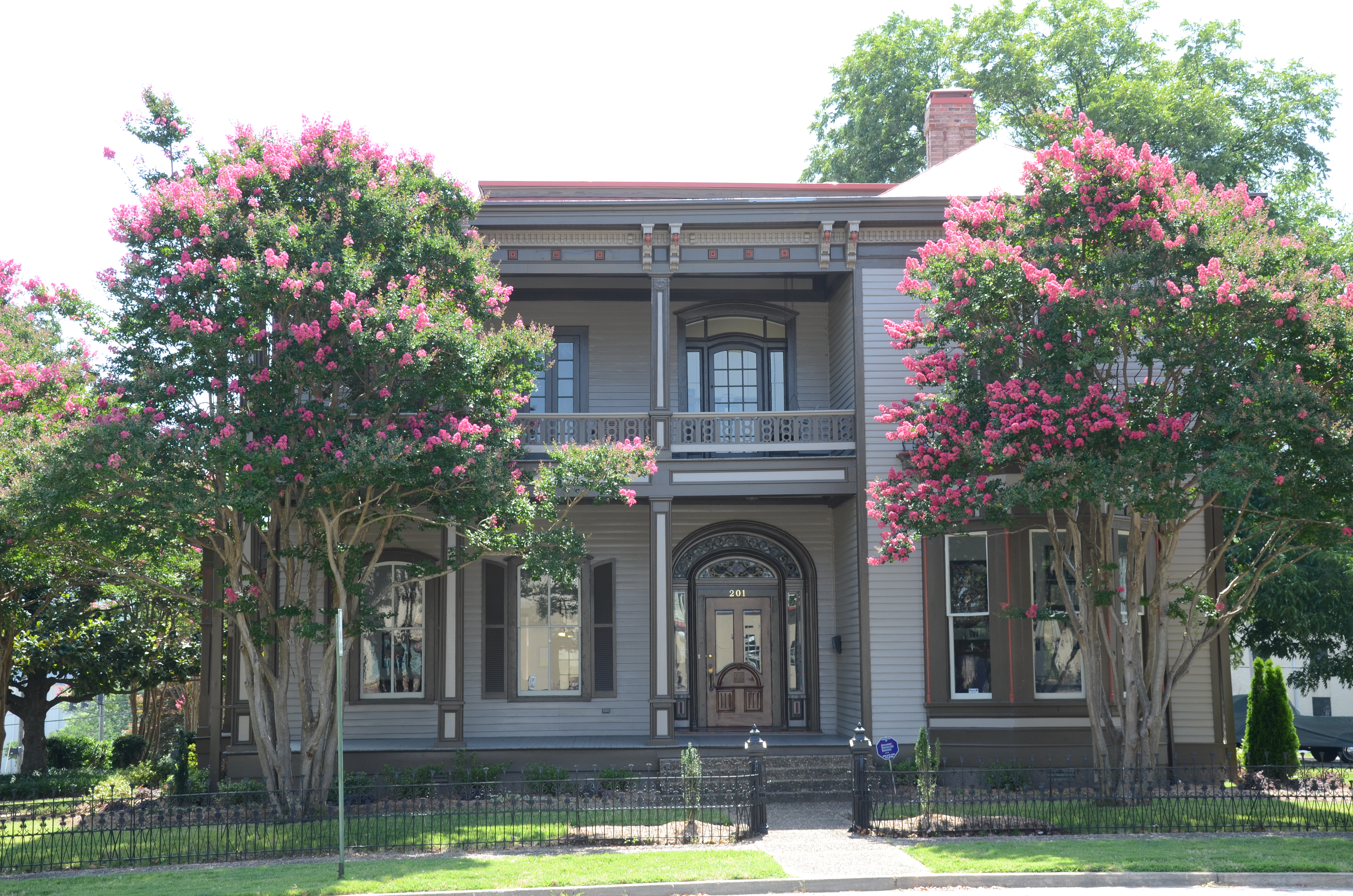

- Location within Arkansas Location within the United States
- Location: 201 S. Izard St., Little Rock, Arkansas
- Coordinates: 34°44′53″N 92°16′46″W
- Area: less than one acre
- Built: 1869
- Architectural style: Italianate
- NRHP reference No.: 80000785
- Added to NRHP: February 29, 1980

The White-Baucum House is a historic house at 201 South Izard Street in Little Rock, Arkansas. It is an L-shaped two story wood-frame house, with a hip roof extending over two stories of balconies in the crook of the L, giving the building an overall rectangular footprint. It has Italianate styling, with a bracketed and dentillated eave, spindled porch balustrades, and an elaborate front entry in a round-arch surround. Built in 1869–70, it is one of Arkansas's earliest and finest examples of high style Italianate architecture.

The house was listed on the National Register of Historic Places in 1980.

== See also ==
- National Register of Historic Places listings in Little Rock, Arkansas
