= James L. Shaver Jr. =

American politician (1927–2021)

Jim Shaver

70th Speaker of the Arkansas House of Representatives
- In office January 10, 1977 – January 8, 1979
- Preceded by: Cecil L. Alexander
- Succeeded by: John E. Miller

Member of the Arkansas House of Representatives
- In office January 10, 1955 – January 9, 1995
- Preceded by: Frank A. Bowdon Jr.
- Succeeded by: James Luker
- Constituency: Cross County (1955‍–‍1967); 26th district (1967‍–‍1973); 71st district (1973‍–‍1983); 46th district (1983‍–‍1993); 90th district (1993‍–‍1995)

Personal details
- Born: James Levesque Shaver Jr. November 23, 1927 Wynne, Arkansas, U.S.
- Died: May 27, 2021 (aged 93) Wynne, Arkansas, U.S.
- Party: Democratic
- Spouse: Bonnie Wood (m. 1949; died 2001)
- Children: 2
- Parent: James L. Shaver (father)
- Education: University of Arkansas (JD)
- Occupation: Lawyer; politician

Military service
- Branch/service: United States Navy
- Years of service: 1945‍–‍1946
- Battles/wars: World War II

James Levesque Shaver Jr. (November 23, 1927 – May 27, 2021) was an American politician. He was a member of the Arkansas House of Representatives, serving from 1955 to 1994. He also served from 1968 to 1971 as an assistant to Attorney General Joe Purcell. He was a member of the Democratic party.

He was the son of former Arkansas Lieutenant Governor James L. Shaver and his wife, Louise Davis. In 1949, he married the former Bonnie Wood, and they enjoyed 52 years of marriage until her death in 2001. Bonnie and Jim were loving parents to a son, Jimmy, who died in 1978 and a daughter, Bonnie Sue Shaver Huff, who currently resides in Wynne. They also have two grandsons – Michael and Jimmy – and five great-grandsons – Michael, Evan, Shaver, William and Tanner. Jim is lovingly known as “Poppy” to these generations, most of whom were, or currently are, being raised in Wynne or being raised to know and love the community.
