= Benjamin T. Laney =

33rd governor of Arkansas

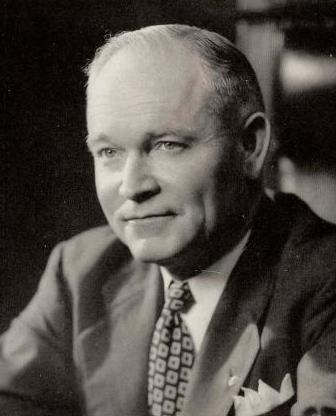

33rd Governor of Arkansas
- In office January 9, 1945 – January 11, 1949
- Lieutenant: James L. Shaver; Nathan Green Gordon
- Preceded by: Homer Martin Adkins
- Succeeded by: Sid McMath

Mayor of Camden, Arkansas
- In office 1935–1939

Personal details
- Born: Benjamin Travis Laney Jr. November 25, 1896 Camden, Arkansas, U.S.
- Died: January 21, 1977 (aged 80) Magnolia, Arkansas, U.S.
- Party: Democratic
- Spouse: Lucille Kirtley
- Children: 3
- Education: Hendrix College; University of Central Arkansas; University of Utah

Military service
- Allegiance: United States
- Branch/service: United States Navy
- Battles/wars: World War I

Benjamin Travis Laney, Jr. (November 25, 1896 – January 21, 1977), was an American businessman who served as the 33rd governor of Arkansas from 1945 to 1949.

== Life and career ==
Laney was born in Camden, where he attended Ouachita County public schools but never graduated from high school. He was, however, admitted in 1915 to Hendrix College, a liberal arts institution in Conway.

His studies were interrupted by World War I. Laney entered the United States Navy in 1918 and served until the end of the war.

In 1924, Laney earned a degree from the University of Central Arkansas (then known as Arkansas Teacher's College), also in Conway. He also took graduate courses from the University of Utah in Salt Lake City. Laney owned a drugstore in Conway, dealt in real estate, and had interests in cotton gins, feed, and banking. Oil was discovered on Laney's farm near Camden. He was hence called "Business Ben" because of his varied business interests.

Laney was elected mayor of Camden in 1935 and served until 1939. In 1944, he successfully ran for governor. In the Democratic primary, Laney polled 70,965 votes (38.6 percent), compared to J. Bryan Sims's 63,454 (34.5 percent), and former U.S. Representative David D. Terry's 49,685 (27 percent). Sims declined to pursue a party runoff election, and Laney was declared the Democratic nominee. He then overwhelmed the Republican nominee, Harley C. Stump of Stuttgart, 186,401 (86 percent) to 30,422 (14 percent). Stump had also run unsuccessfully in 1940 against Carl E. Bailey.

During the Laney administration, the Public Utilities Commission was formed and funds were appropriated for a stadium to be built in Little Rock. Plans were also formed for the construction of an official Governor's Mansion. Laney successfully ran for reelection in 1946. He defeated J. M. Malone in the primary, having polled 125,444 votes, or 64.6 percent of the total. Laney then overwhelmed the Republican W. T. Mills, 128,029 (84.1 percent) to 24,133 (15.9 percent) in the gubernatorial general election. Three Republicans gained seats in the Arkansas House of Representatives, having represented Madison, Newton, and Searcy counties.

Laney sat out a gubernatorial term and unsuccessfully attempted to regain office in 1950, but he failed to unseat the more liberal Democratic incumbent, Sidney Sanders McMath. McMath received 298,559 votes (64 percent) to Laney's 112,651 (34.4 percent). Despite having previously served two terms, Laney campaigned against McMath under the slogan, "Re-Elect Ben Laney Governor, For a Second Time."

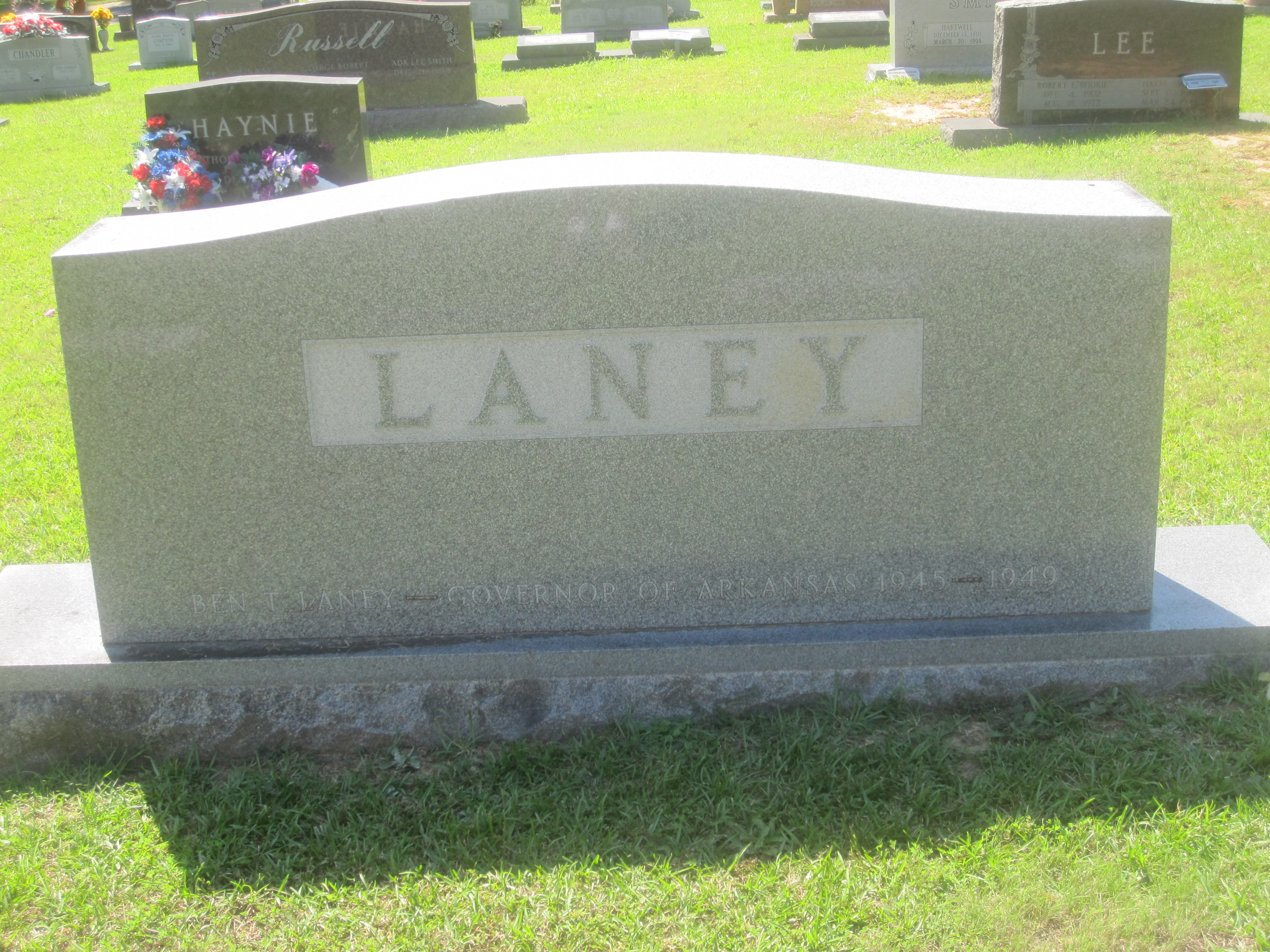
Gravestone of Laney family at Camden Memorial Cemetery

In 1948, Laney was a top choice to serve as the Dixiecrat presidential nominee. At first, he balked and told reporters he would not attend the breakaway convention. However, he changed his mind and made the trip to Birmingham, Alabama. Then he hesitated again and remained in his hotel room. He did not attend the convention and formally withdrew his name from consideration before the nomination was made. The nomination ultimately fell to Strom Thurmond, then the governor of South Carolina.

Laney was a delegate to the 1969 Arkansas Constitutional Convention.

Laney died of a heart attack in Magnolia, the seat of Columbia County south of Camden. He is interred at Camden Memorial Cemetery in Camden, alongside his wife, the former Lucille Kirtley (1906–1992).

== See also ==
- Ben Laney Bridge
- List of governors of Arkansas

Party political offices
Preceded by Homer Martin Adkins	Democratic nominee for Governor of Arkansas; 1944, 1946	Succeeded by Sid McMath
Political offices
Preceded by Homer Martin Adkins	Governor of Arkansas; 1945–1949	Succeeded by Sidney Sanders "Sid" McMath
