= 1946 Arkansas gubernatorial election =

- November 5, 1946
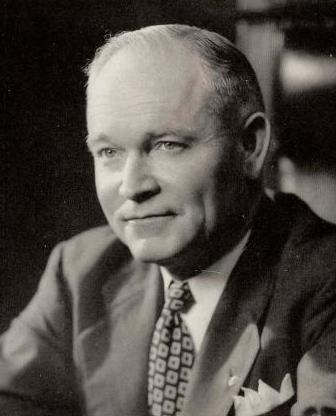

Nominee	Benjamin Travis Laney	W. T. Mills
Party	Democratic	Republican
Popular vote	128,029	24,133
Percentage	84.14%	15.86%
- County results Laney: 50–60% 60–70% 70–80% 80–90% >90% Mills: 50–60% 60–70%
Governor before election
Benjamin Travis Laney
Democratic
Elected Governor
Benjamin Travis Laney
Democratic

The 1946 Arkansas gubernatorial election was held on November 5, 1946.

Incumbent Democratic Governor Benjamin Travis Laney won re-election to a second term, defeating Republican nominee W. T. Mills with 84.14% of the vote.

== Democratic primary ==
The Democratic primary election was held on July 30, 1946.

=== Candidates ===
- Virgil R. Greene, attorney
- Benjamin Travis Laney, incumbent Governor
- James M. "Jim" Malone, former county judge

=== Results ===
Results map of the Democratic primary by county. Laney: 40–50% 50–60% 60–70% 70–80% 80–90% <90% Malone: 40–50% 50–60%

Democratic primary results
Party	Candidate	Votes	%
Democratic	Benjamin Travis Laney (incumbent)	125,444	64.60
Democratic	James M. Malone	63,601	32.75
Democratic	Virgil R. Greene	5,141	2.65
Total votes		194,186	100.00

== General election ==
=== Candidates ===
- Benjamin Travis Laney, Democratic
- W. T. Mills, Republican, lawyer

=== Results ===
1946 Arkansas gubernatorial election
Party	Candidate	Votes	%	±%
Democratic	Benjamin Travis Laney (incumbent)	128,029	84.14%	−1.82%
Republican	W. T. Mills	24,133	15.86%	+1.82%
Majority		103,896	68.28%	
Turnout		152,162	100.00%	
Democratic hold		Swing		

== Bibliography ==
- Gubernatorial Elections, 1787-1997. Washington, D.C.: Congressional Quarterly Inc. 1998. ISBN 1-56802-396-0.
- Glashan, Roy R. (1979). American Governors and Gubernatorial Elections, 1775-1978. Meckler Books. ISBN 0-930466-17-9.
