= Homer Martin Adkins =

32nd Governor of Arkansas (1890–1964)

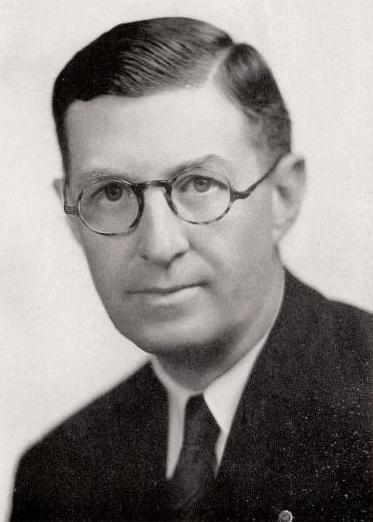

32nd Governor of Arkansas
- In office January 14, 1941 – January 9, 1945
- Lieutenant: Robert L. Bailey; James L. Shaver
- Preceded by: Carl E. Bailey
- Succeeded by: Ben T. Laney

Personal details
- Born: October 15, 1890 Jacksonville, Arkansas, U.S.
- Died: February 26, 1964 (aged 73) Malvern, Arkansas, U.S.
- Resting place: Roselawn Memorial Park; Little Rock, Arkansas
- Party: Democratic
- Spouse: Estelle Elise Smith (m. 1921)
- Children: None
- Education: Draughon's Business College; Little Rock College of Pharmacy
- Profession: Pharmacist, Politician

Military service
- Allegiance: United States
- Branch/service: United States Army
- Rank: Captain
- Unit: Medical Corps
- Battles/wars: World War I

Homer Martin Adkins (October 15, 1890 – February 26, 1964) was an American businessman and Democratic politician who served as the 32nd governor of Arkansas. Adkins is remembered as a skilled retail politician and a strong states' rights proponent and social conservative who served as governor during a period when Arkansas departed from several national economic and societal trends. The Adkins administration fought federal influence in Arkansas during the post-New Deal era; successfully courting federal wartime production investment, during World War II, while battling the federal resettlement of Japanese-Americans in the state and Supreme Court civil rights decisions.

The Adkins administration was, in several ways, a forerunner to years of segregationist governors in Arkansas and across the South; most famously Alabama Governor George Wallace. The former Ku Klux Klan member fought the post-World War II civil rights gains made by African-Americans and sought to organize a constitutional convention to restore the white primary after the Supreme Court's Smith vs. Allwright decision. Derided as "Holy Homer" by opponents, Adkins' strong brand of social conservativism earned formidable opposition from moderates and more progressive politicians, like preceding governor-turned rival Carl E. Bailey, as well as pro-gambling interests in the Arkansas resort town of Hot Springs. After leaving office, Adkins remained an influential voice in state politics, assisting later governors Sid McMath and Orval Faubus.

== Early life, education, and military service ==
He was born near Jacksonville in Pulaski County to Ulysses and Lorena (née Wood) Adkins. He graduated from Little Rock High School in 1907 and Draughon's Business College in 1909. Adkins began working at Snodgrass & Bracy Drug Company in 1910, graduating from the Little Rock College of Pharmacy in 1911 as a licensed pharmacist. The Arkansas State Board of Pharmacy granted Adkins special permission to practice for the six months before his 21st birthday.

Adkins began studying law in 1915, but enlisted in the United States Army during World War I. He rose from a private to a captain in the Medical Corps. Adkins won election as secretary of the Young Men's Democratic Club in 1916. At Camp Beauregard, Adkins met his future wife Estelle Smith; they were wed December 21, 1921. Smith was a Red Cross United States Army nurse, and both were later stationed in France as part of the American Expeditionary Force.

== Early political career ==
=== Pulaski County Sheriff ===
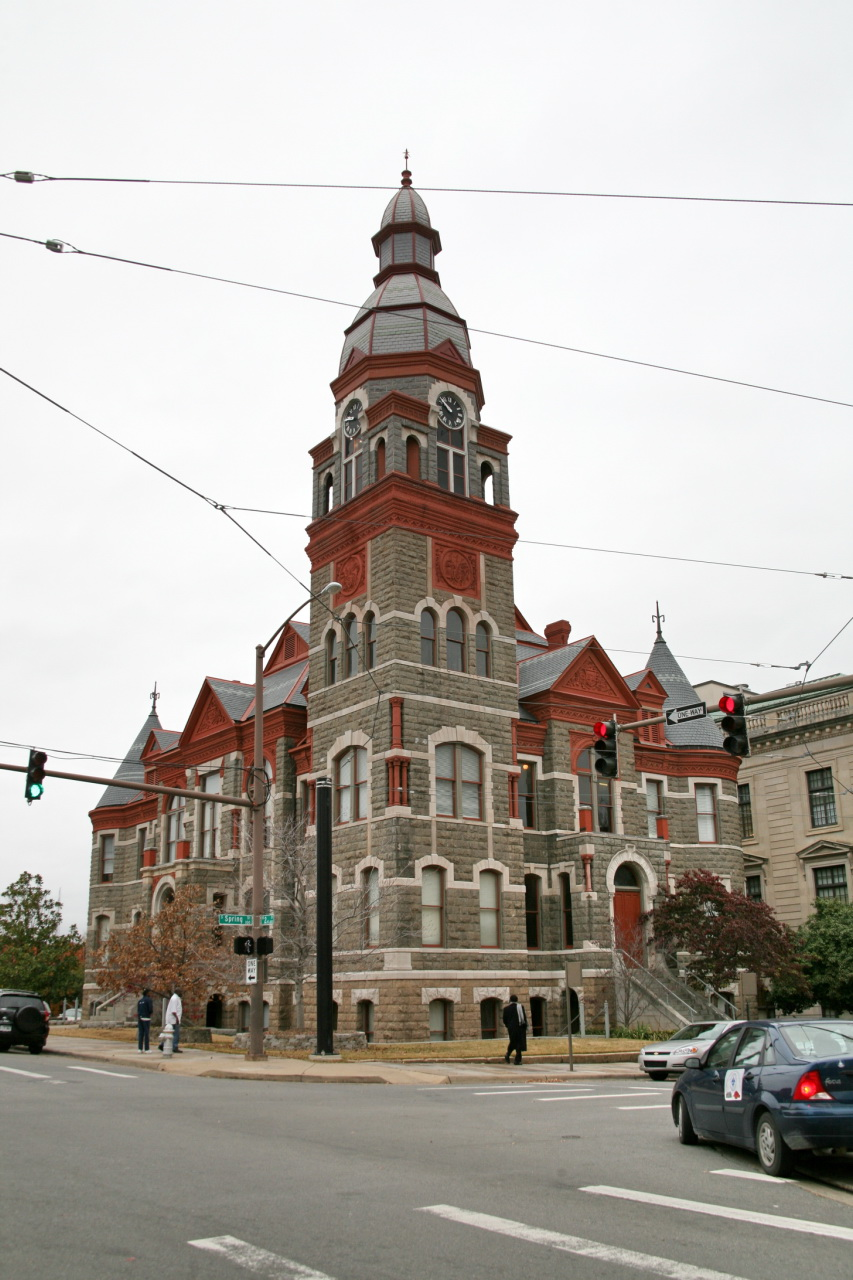
The Pulaski County Sheriff's Office is contained within the Pulaski County Courthouse in Little Rock

Following return from service in France, Adkins sought the office of Pulaski County sheriff in November 1922. At the time, the sheriff and collector positions were combined. During the Solid South, the Democratic Party held firm control of virtually every office in The South, including Arkansas. Winning the Democratic primary was considered tantamount to election, with several different factions of the party, sometimes including the Ku Klux Klan, battling in the open primaries.

With support of the Klan, Adkins won a two-year term beginning January 1926, and won reelection in November 1924, but did not win his November 1926 reelection bid. During his time at the Pulaski County Courthouse, Adkins would clash with Sixth Circuit Deputy Prosecutor Carl E. Bailey, igniting a feud that would impact Arkansas politics for the next several decades. He returned to private enterprise in 1927, working for the Adkins-Williams Fire Insurance Company until 1933. He remained active in Democratic politics, and served on the Little Rock City Council from 1929 to 1933.

=== Collector for Internal Revenue ===
He campaigned for Franklin D. Roosevelt in the 1932 election. Under the system of political patronage underway at the time, Senator Joseph T. Robinson was responsible for rewarding supporters with statewide positions in Arkansas. Adkins was reported to be seeking a post at the United States Marshal's office in Little Rock. Instead appointed as collector for internal revenue in Arkansas in July 1933, Adkins was responsible for educating taxpayers about new taxes and levies ordered at the national level, as well as implementing the collection and enforcing penalties for unpaid taxes.

As the New Deal agencies multiplied under the first 100 days of Franklin D. Roosevelt's presidency, businesses and individuals required more guidance to navigate the growing federal bureaucracy. In 1934, Adkins traveled the agricultural parts of the state discussing a new measure impacting cotton ginners. He spoke to local civic groups like Lions Club and Rotary Club and business groups about the changing federal tax system, and held meetings with the public and local potentates. Implementation of the United States' first payroll tax under the Federal Insurance Contributions Act tax (FICA) to fund the provisions of the Social Security Act presented challenges to employers in Arkansas, and across the country. Early years were marked by large numbers of delinquencies, and guidance from Adkins and staff. The statewide travel and meetings Adkins conducted in his IRS position allowed Adkins to build a strong statewide base of support.

Arkansas' longtime Senator Joe T. Robinson died on July 14, 1937, creating a large void in state politics and a special election to fill the remaining 5 1/2-years of his term. Adkins was mentioned as a possible entrant into the special election. The key Democratic committee selected governor Carl E. Bailey, who had just recently won the 1936 Arkansas gubernatorial election, in lieu of hosting a Democratic primary, almost assuring Bailey's victory in the special election. Allegations were later made against Adkins for ordering his staff to circulate petitions in favor of a state-wide primary (i.e., against appointment of Bailey). Having lost the Democratic nomination fight, a group of anti-Bailey forces tried to convince Adkins to run against Bailey as an independent. Ultimately, John E. Miller, another friend of Robinson's, won election as an independent over Bailey.

Adkins also vigorously campaigned for Senator Hattie Caraway over Representative John L. McClellan for the Democratic nomination ahead of the 1938 United States Senate election in Arkansas. McClellan later requested the Treasury Department investigate Adkins' efforts in the election, but was ultimately cleared by Henry Morgenthau Jr. However, the Senate Special Committee on Campaign Expenditures disagreed with Morgenthau, sustaining many of the charges but ruling "such practices have been common in the past". Adkins responded, "I am and shall continue to be interested in public affairs. I supported Senator Caraway loyally and wholeheartedly as I did the late Senator Robinson and Senator Miller, and in doing so did no more than has been the custom of loyal friends as long as one can remember."

In 1939, Adkins' annual federal salary made news as $6,200 ($144,000 in today's dollars). His tax collection duties continued to take him across the state. Adkins continued to lead the remainder of Robinson's "federal establishment" faction in state politics, battling Bailey over the WPA in Arkansas, Dyess Colomy, and a refinancing of the state's highway debt.

== Governor ==
In early 1940, Adkins traveled to Washington D.C. to confer with the Arkansas federal delegation ahead of announcing a bid in the 1940 Arkansas gubernatorial election. Upon returning, Adkins resigned his collectorship to seek the governor's office. Loathing the idea of turning the statehouse over to Adkins, Bailey decided to break Arkansas tradition and seek a third term, setting up a direct showdown between the leaders of Arkansas's warring Democratic factions in the 1940 Arkansas gubernatorial election.

In the 1940 general election, Adkins defeated the Republican Harley C. Stump, the mayor of Stuttgart and a leader of the Arkansas Municipal League, 91.8 to 8.2 percent. In that campaign Stump claimed the employees of Franklin D. Roosevelt's Works Progress Administration were underpaid. Adkins was unopposed in the 1942 general election for his second term.

Adkins was a member of the Ku Klux Klan, whose support was important in obtaining his first political victory, and its racist views remained a hallmark of his political career.

Adkins sought to build a voting base based on his background as a Methodist Sunday school teacher and church employee. His detractors often referred to him as "Holy Homer." He campaigned on a platform of reform and ending the practice of bootlegging.

In his first term, Adkins was awarded honorary Doctor of Laws degrees from both John Brown University and Bob Jones University in 1941. Both are private Christian universities known for conservative cultural and religious positions.

The Adkins administration presided over a doubling of the surplus in the state's treasury. His administration focused on highway construction and financing, electrification, and worker's compensation.

In his second term, Adkins signed into law a bill that would prevent anyone of Japanese descent from owning land in Arkansas. Looking for a new challenge, he was defeated in 1944 in a bid for the U.S. Senate. He opposed Senator Hattie Caraway and the freshman U.S. Representative J. William Fulbright of Fayetteville. Mrs. Caraway finished third, with Fulbright later winning the Democratic runoff against Adkins. Fulbright then claimed the Senate seat when he defeated the Republican Victor Wade of Batesville, 85.1 to 14.9 percent.

In 1948, Adkins was appointed administrator of the Arkansas Employment Security Division, the agency responsible for worker's unemployment insurance.

In 1956, he established a public relations firm in Little Rock.

== Death and legacy ==
Adkins died in 1964 in Malvern, Arkansas. He is interred at the Roselawn Memorial Park Cemetery in Little Rock.

== See also ==
- List of governors of Arkansas

Party political offices
| Preceded by Carl E. Bailey | Democratic nominee for Governor of Arkansas; 1940, 1942 | Succeeded by Benjamin Travis Laney |
Political offices
| Preceded by Carl E. Bailey | Governor of Arkansas; 1941–1945 | Succeeded by Benjamin Travis Laney |
