= 1936 Arkansas gubernatorial election =

- November 3, 1936
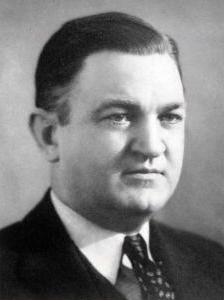

Nominee	Carl E. Bailey	Osro Cobb
Party	Democratic	Republican
Popular vote	155,152	26,875
Percentage	84.89%	14.71%
- County results Bailey: 50–60% 60–70% 70–80% 80–90% >90% Cobb: 50–60% 70–80%
Governor before election
Junius Marion Futrell
Democratic
Elected Governor
Carl E. Bailey
Democratic

The 1936 Arkansas gubernatorial election was held on November 3, 1936, in order to elect the Governor of Arkansas. Democratic nominee Carl E. Bailey defeated Republican nominee Osro Cobb.

== Democratic primary ==
The Democratic primary election was held on August 14, 1936. Incumbent Attorney General of Arkansas Carl E. Bailey received a majority of the votes (31.99%), and was thus elected as the nominee for the general election on November 3, 1936.

=== Results ===
1936 Democratic gubernatorial primary
Party	Candidate	Votes	%
Democratic	Carl E. Bailey	76,014	31.99%
Democratic	Ed McDonald	72,075	30.33%
Democratic	R. A. Cook	60,768	25.58%
Democratic	Tom Terral	23,663	9.96%
Democratic	Howard Reed	5,089	2.14%
Total votes		237,609	100.00%

== General election ==
On election day, November 3, 1936, Democratic nominee Carl E. Bailey won the election by a margin of 128,277 votes against his foremost opponent Republican nominee Osro Cobb, a former U.S. Attorney, thereby retaining Democratic control over the office of Governor. Bailey was sworn in as the 31st Governor of Arkansas on January 12, 1937.

=== Results ===
1936 Arkansas gubernatorial election
Party	Candidate	Votes	%
Democratic	Carl E. Bailey	155,152	84.89
Republican	Osro Cobb	26,875	14.71
Socialist	J. Russell Butler	733	0.40
Total votes		182,760	100.00
Democratic hold			
