= James L. Shaver =

Lieutenant Governor of Arkansas

9th Lieutenant Governor of Arkansas
- In office January 12, 1943 – January 14, 1947
- Governor: Homer Martin Adkins; Benjamin T. Laney
- Preceded by: Robert B. Bailey
- Succeeded by: Nathan Green Gordon

Member of the Arkansas Senate from the 7th district
- In office January 14, 1931 – January 9, 1939
- Preceded by: Walter W. Raney
- Succeeded by: Lucian E. Coleman

Member of the Arkansas House of Representatives from Cross County
- In office January 12, 1925 – January 14, 1931
- Preceded by: J. C. Brookfield
- Succeeded by: Samuel A. Gooch

Personal details
- Born: James Levesque Shaver; May 17, 1902 Vanndale, Arkansas, U.S.
- Died: August 1, 1985 (aged 83) Cross County, Arkansas, U.S.
- Resting place: Cogbill Cemetery; Wynne, Arkansas, U.S.
- Party: Democratic
- Spouse: Louise Davis (m. 1922)
- Children: 2, including James Jr.
- Education: Hendrix College; Washington and Lee University (LLB)
- Occupation: Lawyer; politician

James Levesque "Bex" Shaver (May 17, 1902 – August 1, 1985) was the ninth lieutenant governor of Arkansas from 1943 to 1947, serving as the second lieutenant governor of Governor Homer Martin Adkins, and the first lieutenant governor of Governor Benjamin Travis Laney. He also served in the Arkansas House of Representatives and Arkansas Senate.

== Early life ==
James Levesque Shaver was born in Vanndale, Arkansas. His brother mispronounced his middle name as "Bex" and it became his nicknames. Newspapers misspelled the nickname as "Beck".

Shaver graduated from public schools in Wynne. He attended Hendrix College and graduated from the Washington and Lee University School of Law with a Bachelor of Laws in 1921. He was admitted to the bar in Arkansas.

== Career ==
Shaver continued to practice law in Wynne until the end of his life. He was president of the Arkansas Bar Association.

Shaver served as a member of the Arkansas House of Representatives, representing Cross County from 1925 to 1930. He was elected to the Arkansas Senate, representing Cross and Woodruff counties, in 1931, 1935, and 1937. In 1941, he was legislative secretary to the Arkansas governor. He served two terms as lieutenant governor of Arkansas from 1943 to 1946. He served as acting governor while Governor Homer Martin Adkins took an absence. Shaver was succeeded in 1947 by his fellow Democrat Nathan Green Gordon.

Shaver was a member of the Cross, Arkansas and American Bar Associations, and the Arkansas College of Trial Lawyers. He served as chairman and member of the board of Cross County Hospital from 1951 to 1977.

== Personal life ==
Shaver married Louise Davis on February 24, 1922. They had one son and one daughter, James L. Jr. and Winnie. He was a member of Wynne Presbyterian Church.

Shaver died on August 1, 1985, at Cross County Memorial Hospital. He was buried in Cogbill Cemetery in Wynne.

== Awards ==
Shaver received the Arkansas Bar Association's outstanding lawyer-citizen award in 1971.

Political offices
Preceded by Robert L. Bailey	Lieutenant Governor of Arkansas; 1943–1947	Succeeded by Nathan Green Gordon
