= Pulaski County Courthouse (Arkansas) =

- U.S. National Register of Historic Places
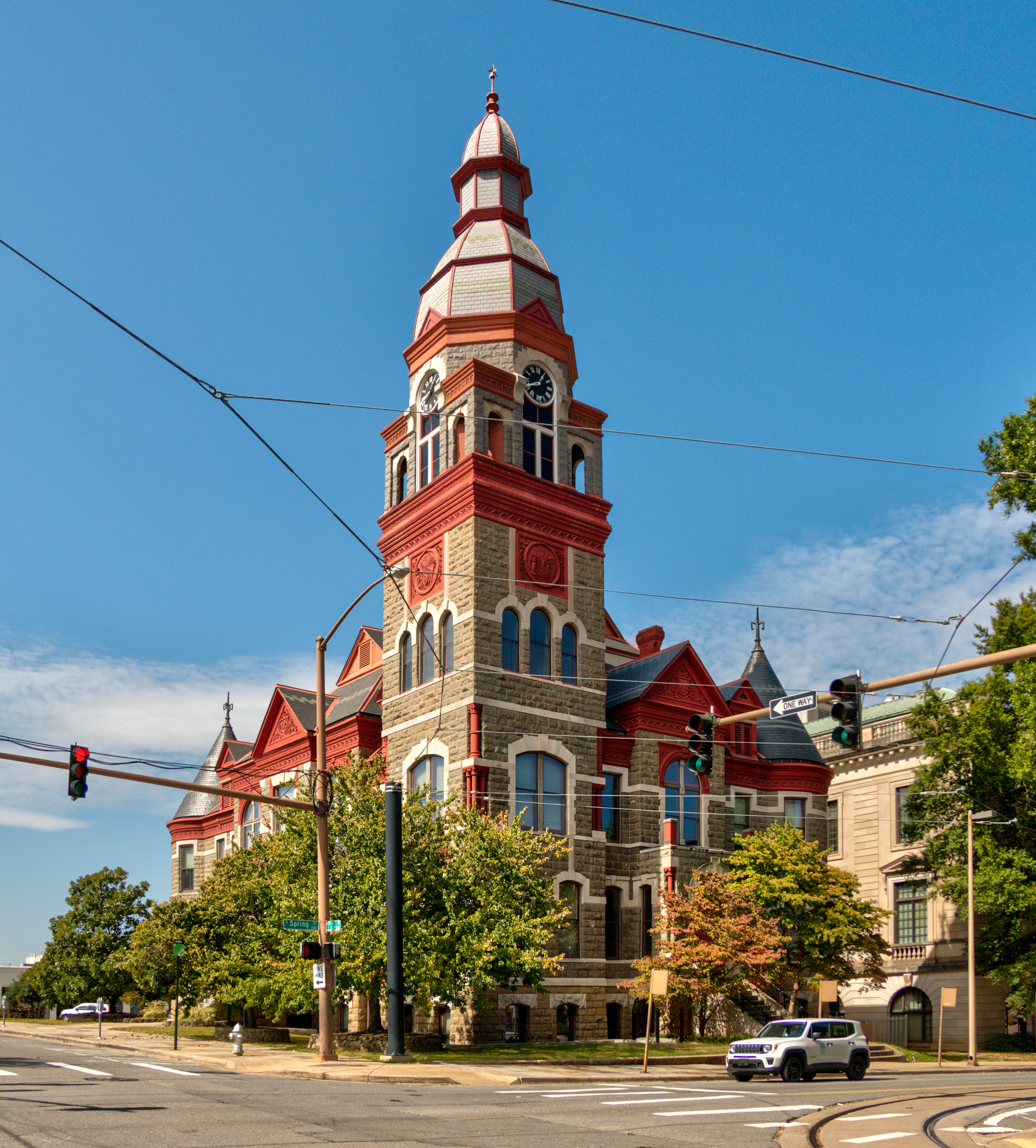

- Location within Arkansas Location within the United States
- Interactive map showing the location of Pulaski County Courthouse
- Location: 405 W. Markham St., Little Rock, Arkansas
- Coordinates: 34°44′57″N 92°16′32″W
- Area: 1.5 acres (0.61 ha)
- Built: 1887
- Architect: Max A. Orlopp, Jr., George Mann
- Architectural style: Beaux Arts, Romanesque
- NRHP reference No.: 79000454
- Added to NRHP: October 18, 1979

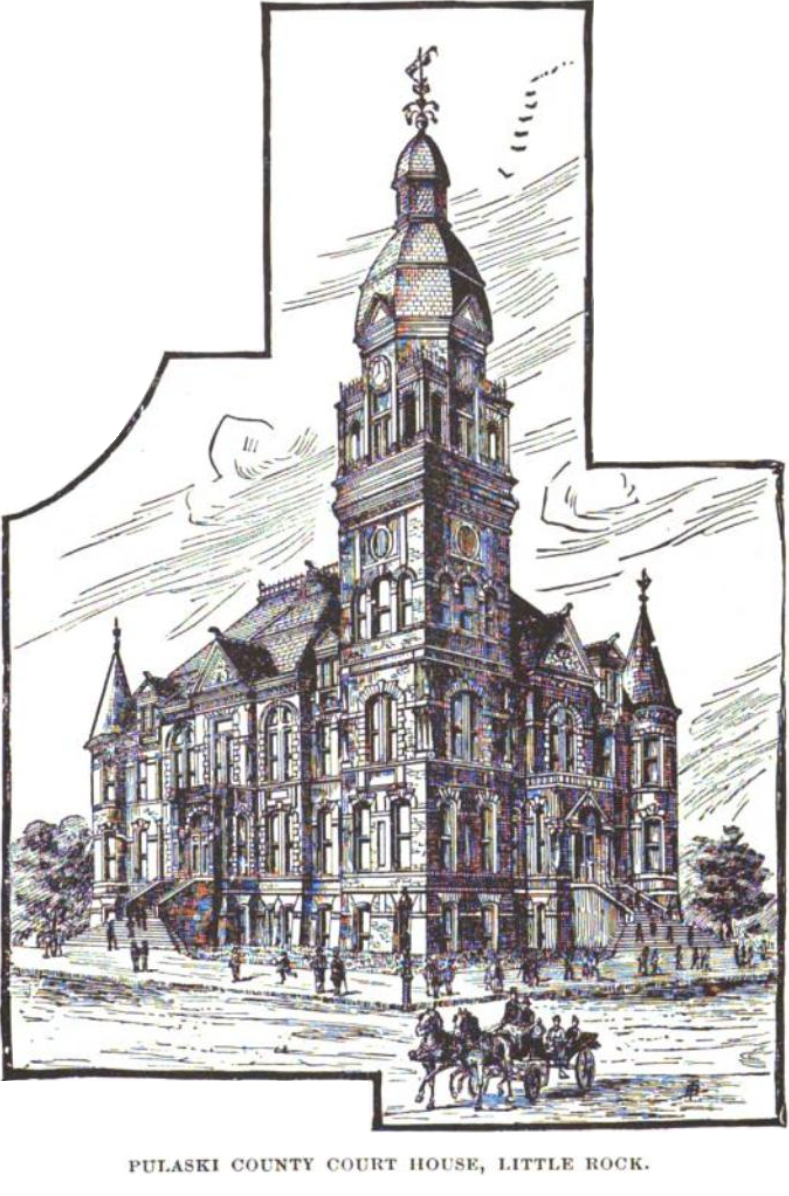
1890 drawing of the courthouse.

The Pulaski County Courthouse is located at 405 West Markham Street in downtown Little Rock, Arkansas, the state capital and the county seat of Pulaski County. It is set among a number of other state and city government buildings, on a city block bounded by West Markham, Spring, West 2nd, and South Broadway Streets, with a county park occupying the western portion of the block. The courthouse has two portions: an elaborate Romanesque edifice built of stone and brick in 1887–89 to a design by Max A. Orlopp, and a large four-story Beaux Arts annex designed by George Mann and added in 1913–14. The annex is acknowledged as one of Mann's most successful commissions.

The building was listed on the National Register of Historic Places in 1979.

== See also ==
- National Register of Historic Places listings in Little Rock, Arkansas
