= Carl E. Bailey =

31st governor of Arkansas, United States

Carl Edward Bailey
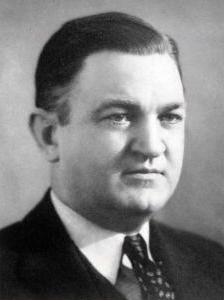

31st Governor of Arkansas
- In office January 12, 1937 – January 14, 1941
- Lieutenant: Robert B. Bailey
- Preceded by: Junius Marion Futrell
- Succeeded by: Homer Martin Adkins

Attorney General of Arkansas
- In office 1935–1937
- Governor: Junius Marion Futrell
- Preceded by: Walter L. Pope
- Succeeded by: Jack Holt

Personal details
- Born: October 8, 1894 Bernie, Missouri, U.S.
- Died: October 23, 1948 (aged 54) Little Rock, Arkansas, U.S.
- Party: Democratic
- Education: Chillicothe Business College
- Profession: Attorney

Military service
- Branch/service: United States Army
- Rank: Captain of the Medical Corps
- Battles/wars: World War I

Carl Edward Bailey (October 8, 1894 – October 23, 1948) was an American attorney and the 31st governor of Arkansas from 1937 to 1941.

== Early life ==
Bailey was born in Bernie in Stoddard County in southeastern Missouri. He attended public schools and graduated high school in Campbell, Missouri in 1912.

Bailey hoped to attend the University of Missouri in Columbia, but he was unable to secure the financing. In 1915, he attended Chillicothe Business College, where he studied bookkeeping and accounting.

Bailey worked for a time as a railroad brakeman in Texas and later opened a cafe in Campbell. He also served as deputy tax collector in Dunklin County, Missouri.

In 1917, he moved to Weona in Poinsett County, Arkansas, and worked as a cashier in Weona, in nearby Trumann and later in Augusta, Arkansas.

== Legal studies and practice ==
Bailey studied law and was admitted to the bar in Arkansas in 1923, and opened a private law practice in 1925. He served as a deputy prosecuting attorney in the Sixth Judicial District of Arkansas from 1927 to 1931.

Bailey became a prosecuting attorney and served in that position from 1931 to 1935. In 1934, he was elected to the post of Arkansas attorney general and served one two-year term. In 1936, mobster Lucky Luciano was arrested in Hot Springs and offered Attorney General Bailey a $50,000 bribe if Bailey would not extradite him to New York. Bailey refused the bribe.

== Political career ==
Described by one study as “a great supporter of the New Deal,” Bailey was elected in 1936 to the first of his two terms as governor. In the general election, Bailey handily defeated the Republican Osro Cobb, who had represented Montgomery County in the Arkansas House of Representatives from 1927 to 1930.

Cobb waged an active campaign, having stressed that he was born in Arkansas, whereas the Missouri-born Bailey was a "northern man". Cobb had proposed the creation of a second national park in the state in the Ouachita National Forest between Little Rock and Shreveport, Louisiana, but the measure was pocket vetoed by U.S. President Calvin Coolidge. Bailey received 156,852 votes (85.4 percent) to Cobb's 26,875 ballots (14.6 percent). Cobb recalled that after the election:

many persons called and visited and complainted [sic] that they thought a substantial number of votes for me had not been counted. This probably did happen, though to what extent no one can be sure. It also hurt the presidential campaign of my friend, Governor Alf M. Landon of Kansas. This reinforced my conviction that it was absolutely necessary for the rights of the minority party to be protected in elections through the appointment of precinct judges and clerks.

After World War II, an initiated act required Republican representation at all precincts and on counting boards. Without such a measure, it was speculated that Republicans could never have overcome the obstacles they faced in an attempt to establish a two-party system in Arkansas.

Bailey's lieutenant governor was also named "Bailey" (Robert B. Bailey). The Bailey administration developed a library and retirement system and established the state's first agricultural experiment station at Batesville. During his term, the Department of Public Welfare was founded and Arkansas was made eligible for federal welfare programs. Bailey supported U.S. President Franklin Delano Roosevelt's New Deal programs. During Bailey's term, the Arkansas State Police was created and the first civil service laws in the American South were enacted.

After U.S. Senator Joseph Taylor Robinson died in office in 1937, Bailey attempted to take the seat himself. He was chosen as the Democratic nominee by the state party convention, which he controlled. However, he had promised when running for governor that he would place such nominations to a vote of the people. Political opponents within the Democratic Party ran an "independent" candidate, who criticized Bailey's broken promise. Bailey lost the election by a wide margin to John E. Miller.

By a margin of 91.4 to 8.6 percent, Bailey won his second term as governor in the 1938 general election over the Republican Charles F. Cole of Batesville. In 1940, Bailey sought a third consecutive term as governor but lost to intraparty rival Homer Martin Adkins.

After leaving the governorship, he served as a lobbyist for a railroad union and taught law at the University of Arkansas Law School in Fayetteville. In 1942, he founded the Carl Bailey Company, an International Harvester franchise, which sold innovative farming machinery. Bailey stayed active in politics and continued to wield some influence. In 1944, J. William Fulbright, a congressman from Fayetteville and former president of the University of Arkansas, who had been dismissed by Governor Adkins, opposed Adkins for a U.S. Senate seat. Bailey supported Fulbright, who defeated Adkins and two other opponents and then served until his own defeat in 1974 by fellow Democrat Dale Bumpers.

== Death and legacy ==
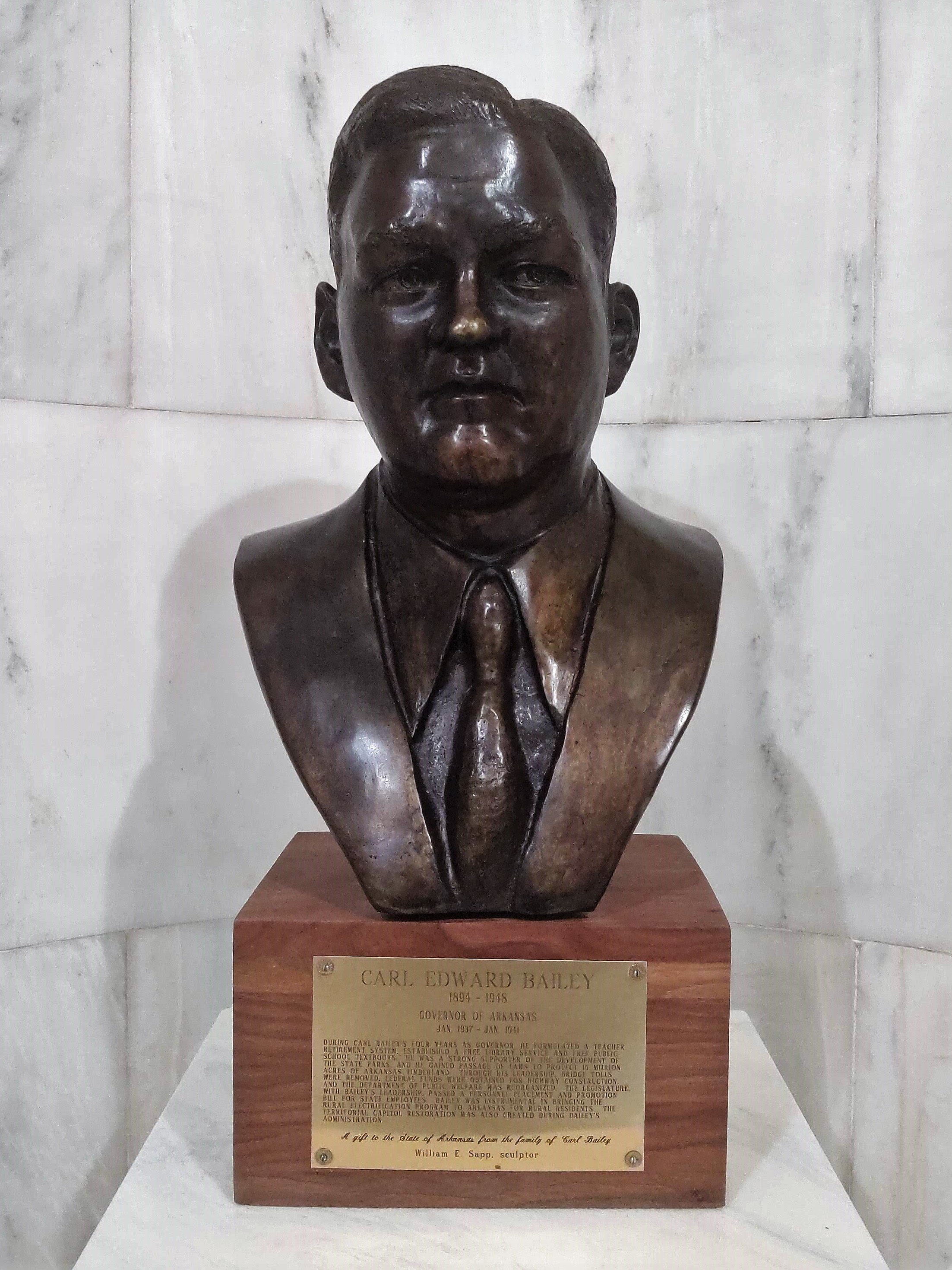
Bailey bust in the Arkansas State Capitol

Bailey died of a heart attack on October 23, 1948, in Little Rock.

The Carl Bailey Company Building on Broadway in Little Rock is listed on the National Register of Historic Places for its architectural significance.

The University of Arkansas maintains a scholarship to the law school in his name.

== See also ==
- List of governors of Arkansas

Party political offices
Preceded by Junius Marion Futrell	Democratic nominee for Governor of Arkansas; 1936, 1938	Succeeded by Homer Martin Adkins
Preceded by Joseph Taylor Robinson	Democratic nominee for U.S. Senator from Arkansas (Class 2); 1937	Succeeded by John L. McClellan
Political offices
Preceded by Junius Marion Futrell	Governor of Arkansas; 1937–1941	Succeeded by Homer Martin Adkins
Preceded by Walter L. Pope	Arkansas Attorney General; 1935–1937	Succeeded by Jack Holt
