= 1952 Arkansas gubernatorial election =

- November 4, 1952
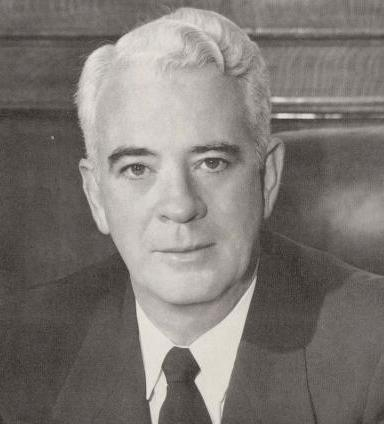

Nominee	Francis Cherry	Jefferson W. Speck
Party	Democratic	Republican
Popular vote	342,292	49,292
Percentage	87.41%	12.59%
- County results Cherry: 50–60% 60–70% 70–80% 80–90% >90%
Governor before election
Sid McMath
Democratic
Elected Governor
Francis Cherry
Democratic

The 1952 Arkansas gubernatorial election was held on November 4, 1952.

Incumbent Democratic Governor Sid McMath was defeated in the Democratic primary.

Democratic nominee Francis Cherry defeated Republican nominee Jefferson W. Speck with 87.41% of the vote.

== Primary elections ==
Primary elections were held on July 29, 1952, with the Democratic runoff held on August 12, 1952.

=== Democratic primary ===
==== Candidates ====
- Francis Cherry, Chancery Judge
- Jack Holt, former attorney general and unsuccessful candidate for Democratic nomination for governor in 1948
- Sid McMath, incumbent governor
- Ike Murry, incumbent Arkansas Attorney General
- Boyd Anderson Tackett, U.S. Representative for the 4th district

==== Results ====
Results map of the Democratic primary by county. McMath: 20–30% 30–40% 40–50% 50–60% 70–80% <90% Cherry: 20–30% 30–40% 40–50% 50–60% 60–70% 70–80% Tackett: 20–30% 30–40% 40–50% 60–70% 70–80% Holt: 30–40% 40–50% 50–60% Murray: 20–30% 30–40% 60–70%

Results map of the Democratic primary runoff by county. Cherry: 50–60% 60–70% 70–80% 80–90% McMath: 50–60% 60–70% 70–80% <90%

Democratic primary results
Party	Candidate	Votes	%
Democratic	Sid McMath (incumbent)	100,858	30.65
Democratic	Francis Cherry	91,195	27.72
Democratic	Boyd Anderson Tackett	63,827	19.40
Democratic	Jack Holt	45,233	13.75
Democratic	Ike Murry	27,937	8.49
Total votes		329,050	100.00

Democratic primary run-off results
Party	Candidate	Votes	%
Democratic	Francis Cherry	237,448	63.07
Democratic	Sid McMath (incumbent)	139,052	36.93
Total votes		376,500	100.00

== General election ==
=== Candidates ===
- Francis Cherry, Democratic
- Jefferson W. Speck, Republican, farmer, and candidate for governor in 1950

=== Results ===
1952 Arkansas gubernatorial election
Party	Candidate	Votes	%	±%
Democratic	Francis Cherry	342,292	87.41%	+3.28%
Republican	Jefferson W. Speck	49,292	12.59%	−3.28%
Scattering		8	0.00%	
Majority		293,000	74.82%	
Turnout		391,592	100.00%	
Democratic hold		Swing		

== Bibliography ==
- Gubernatorial Elections, 1787-1997. Washington, D.C.: Congressional Quarterly Inc. 1998. ISBN 1-56802-396-0.
