= Keasler =

Keasler is a surname. Notable people with the surname include:

- Bobby Keasler (born 1945), American football coach
- John Keasler (1921–1995), American newspaper columnist
- Michael Keasler (born 1942), American judge

== See also ==
- Kasler
- Kesler
- Kessler (name)
