= 1948 United States presidential election in Arkansas =

- November 2, 1948

All 9 Arkansas votes to the Electoral College

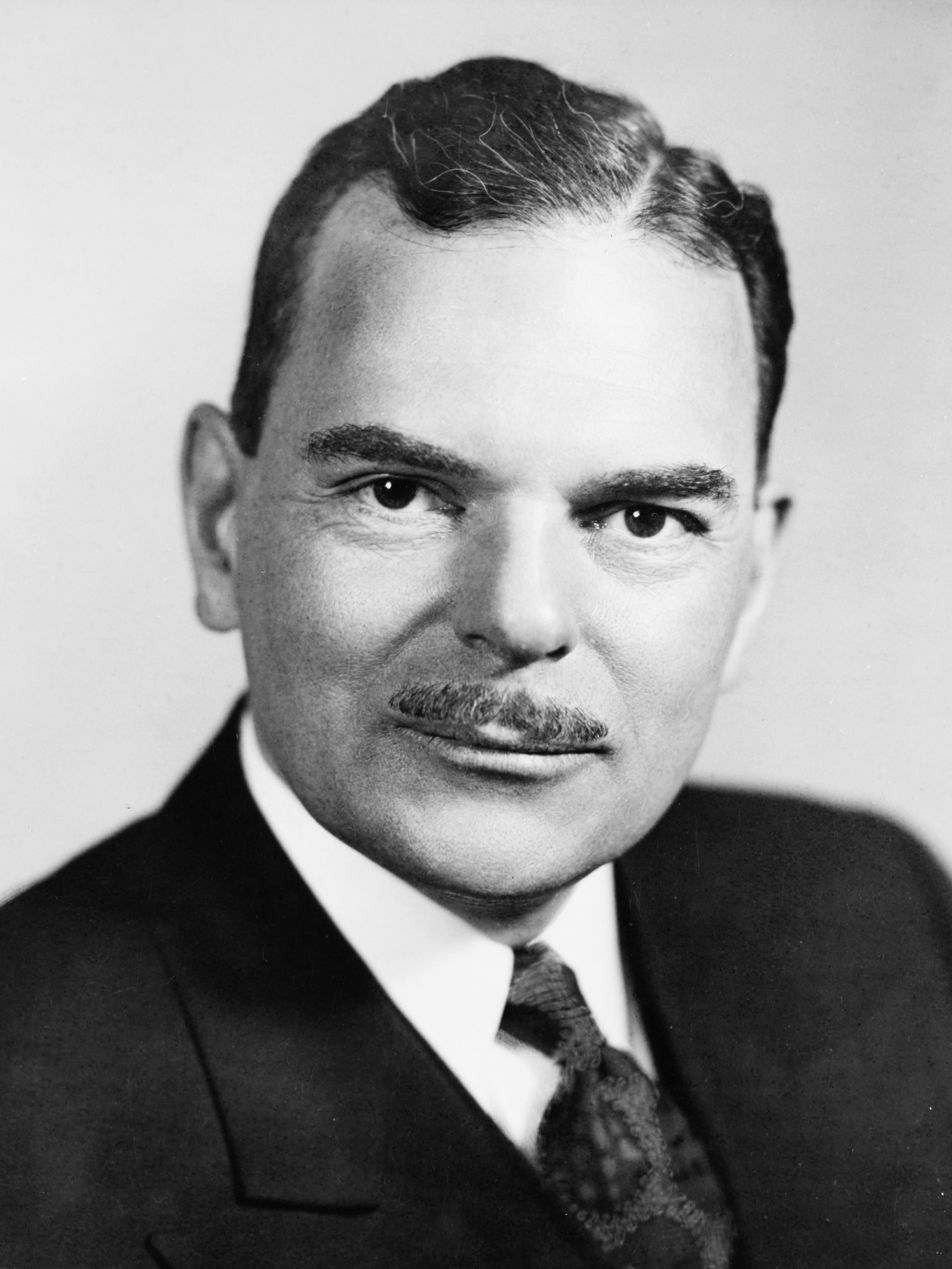

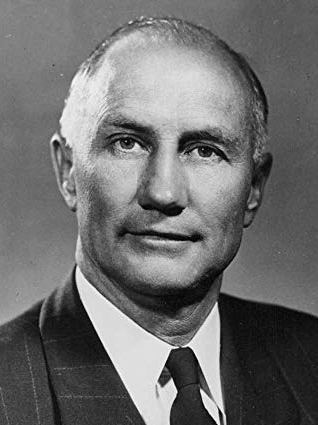
Nominee	Harry S. Truman	Thomas E. Dewey	Strom Thurmond
Party	Democratic	Republican	States' Rights Democratic
Home state	Missouri	New York	South Carolina
Running mate	Alben W. Barkley	Earl Warren	Fielding L. Wright
Electoral vote	9	0	0
Popular vote	149,659	50,959	40,068
Percentage	61.7%	21.0%	16.5%
County results
Truman
40–50%
50–60%
60–70%
70–80%
80–90%
Dewey
50–60%
Thurmond
50–60%
60–70%
President before election
Harry S. Truman
Democratic
Elected President
Harry S. Truman
Democratic

The 1948 United States presidential election in Arkansas took place on November 2, 1948, as part of the 1948 United States presidential election. State voters chose nine representatives, or electors, to the Electoral College, who voted for president and vice president. This would be the last presidential election where Arkansas had nine electoral votes: the Great Migration would see the state lose three congressional districts in the next decade-and-a-half.

Except for the Unionist Ozark counties of Newton and Searcy where Republicans controlled local government, Arkansas since the end of Reconstruction had been a classic one-party Democratic "Solid South" state. Disfranchisement of effectively all black people and most poor whites had meant that outside those two aberrant counties, the Republican Party was completely moribund and Democratic primaries were the only competitive elections.

However, ever since seeing the potential effect on the United States' image abroad (and ability to win the Cold War against the radically egalitarian rhetoric of Communism) of the beating and blinding of Isaac Woodard three hours after being discharged from the army, President Truman was attempting to launch a Civil Rights bill, involving desegregation of the military. This produced severe opposition from Southern Democrats, who aimed to have South Carolina Governor James Strom Thurmond listed as Democratic presidential nominee and Mississippi Governor Fielding Wright as vice-presidential nominee.

Unlike Oklahoma, Tennessee, North Carolina or Virginia, Arkansas did not have a major threat from the Republican Party to block local Democratic support for Thurmond, but it had only half the proportion of blacks found in Mississippi or South Carolina. At the time when it became clear that a Southern fracture from the national Democratic Party was on the agenda, Arkansas was deeply divided between a Dixiecrat faction headed by outgoing Governor Ben T. Laney and a loyalist faction led by Sidney S. McMath, who went on to win the 1948 Arkansas gubernatorial election.

McMath was to win the Democratic gubernatorial primary that was in this one-party state tantamount to election, and despite the efforts of Laney and state party chairman Arthur Adams, it was clear from the beginning of the campaign that they held little sway over the Democratic rank and file who were loyal to Truman. In May 1948 Governor Laney became chairman of the "States' Rights Democrats"; however on July 12 the possibility of Laney himself becoming the nominee ended when he refused to support anyone. However, as late as the September 22 Democratic Convention the Dixiecrats had hopes of pledging Arkansas' Democratic presidential electors to Thurmond and Wright; however McMath and Congressman Charles Fuller were able to persuade the electors to remain loyal to President Truman.

With the state's Democratic electors pledged to Truman, the incumbent President and running mate Kentucky Senator Alben W. Barkley easily carried Arkansas with 61.72 percent of the popular vote, against New York Governor Thomas E. Dewey and California Governor Earl Warren's 21.02 percent of the popular vote. Vis-à-vis the 1944 election, Truman picked up Benton County and Searcy County, the latter of which had previously only voted Democratic once since the Civil War. (Note: The only other Democrats to claim Searcy County since the Civil War have been Franklin D. Roosevelt in 1932 and Jimmy Carter in 1976, although some figures for 1912 have Woodrow Wilson carrying the county because the totals for incumbent William Howard Taft in Searcy and Sebastian counties are contradictory.)

Thurmond, running as a third-party candidate, was able to capture 16.52 percent of Arkansas' vote. The Dixiecrats ran strongest in the Delta region of the state where Truman's Civil Rights and "Fair Deal" policies were most feared by the powerful Black Belt planters; Thurmond carried three counties with entirely nonvoting black majorities and was second in twenty-eight others. However, in the hilly northwestern half of the state, Thurmond failed to crack 5 percent of the vote in eighteen counties. As of the 2024 presidential election, this is the last election in which Benton County and Sebastian County voted for a Democratic presidential candidate. Arkansas was also the only state in the entire country where Norman Thomas beat Henry Wallace.

== Campaign ==
The Republican Party of Arkansas voted to send an uncommitted fourteen member delegation to the Republican National Convention.

Thurmond won 17% of the white vote.

== Results ==
1948 United States presidential election in Arkansas
Party	Candidate	Votes	%
Democratic	Harry S. Truman (inc.)	149,659	61.72%
Republican	Thomas E. Dewey	50,959	21.02%
Dixiecrat	Strom Thurmond	40,068	16.52%
Socialist	Norman Thomas	1,037	0.43%
Progressive	Henry A. Wallace	751	0.31%
Prohibition	Claude A. Watson	1	0.00%
Total votes		242,475	100%

=== Results by county ===
County	Harry S. Truman Democratic		Thomas E. Dewey Republican		Strom Thurmond Dixiecrat		Norman Thomas Socialist		Henry A. Wallace Progressive		Margin		Total votes cast
County	#	%	#	%	#	%	#	%	#	%	#	%	Total votes cast
Arkansas	1,781	53.07%	737	21.96%	806	24.02%	23	0.69%	9	0.27%	975 (Note: In this county where Dewey ran third behind both Truman and Thurmond, margin given is Truman vote minus Thurmond vote and percentage margin Truman percentage minus Thurmond percentage.)	29.05%	3,356
Ashley	1,844	76.58%	197	8.18%	342	14.20%	24	1.00%	1	0.04%	1,502	62.38%	2,408
Baxter	1,098	62.39%	553	31.42%	54	3.07%	45	2.56%	10	0.57%	545	30.97%	1,760
Benton	3,281	50.38%	2,911	44.70%	274	4.21%	13	0.20%	34	0.52%	370	5.68%	6,513
Boone	3,190	63.86%	1,499	30.01%	274	5.49%	11	0.22%	21	0.42%	1,691	33.85%	4,995
Bradley	1,426	65.20%	213	9.74%	532	24.33%	7	0.32%	9	0.41%	894	40.87%	2,187
Calhoun	768	83.66%	45	4.90%	104	11.33%	0	0.00%	1	0.11%	664	72.33%	918
Carroll	2,032	55.10%	1,525	41.35%	98	2.66%	15	0.41%	18	0.49%	507	13.75%	3,688
Chicot	952	54.03%	203	11.52%	598	33.94%	4	0.23%	5	0.28%	354	20.09%	1,762
Clark	1,750	69.75%	383	15.27%	363	14.47%	9	0.36%	4	0.16%	1,367	54.48%	2,509
Clay	2,069	66.94%	878	28.41%	128	4.14%	14	0.45%	2	0.06%	1,191	38.53%	3,091
Cleburne	1,061	73.32%	312	21.56%	64	4.42%	8	0.55%	2	0.14%	749	51.76%	1,447
Cleveland	679	67.50%	79	7.85%	245	24.35%	3	0.30%	0	0.00%	434	43.15%	1,006
Columbia	1,788	59.98%	217	7.28%	962	32.27%	12	0.40%	2	0.07%	826	27.71%	2,981
Conway	1,771	72.17%	425	17.32%	248	10.11%	5	0.20%	5	0.20%	1,346	54.85%	2,454
Craighead	3,238	63.37%	759	14.85%	1,054	20.63%	42	0.82%	17	0.33%	2,184	42.74%	5,110
Crawford	1,730	58.60%	1,002	33.94%	190	6.44%	18	0.61%	12	0.41%	728	24.66%	2,952
Crittenden	594	24.83%	137	5.73%	1,657	69.27%	2	0.08%	2	0.08%	-1,063	-44.44%	2,392
Cross	1,100	48.57%	213	9.40%	949	41.90%	2	0.09%	1	0.04%	151	6.67%	2,265
Dallas	1,174	68.98%	152	8.93%	370	21.74%	4	0.24%	2	0.12%	804	47.24%	1,702
Desha	2,122	69.96%	233	7.68%	670	22.09%	4	0.13%	4	0.13%	1,452	47.87%	3,033
Drew	1,204	59.40%	182	8.98%	630	31.08%	5	0.25%	6	0.30%	574	28.32%	2,027
Faulkner	2,653	73.76%	626	17.40%	304	8.45%	10	0.28%	4	0.11%	2,027	56.36%	3,597
Franklin	1,591	76.05%	391	18.69%	95	4.54%	6	0.29%	9	0.43%	1,200	57.36%	2,092
Fulton	850	69.27%	339	27.63%	32	2.61%	2	0.16%	4	0.33%	511	41.64%	1,227
Garland	3,764	52.61%	2,286	31.95%	994	13.89%	48	0.67%	62	0.87%	1,478	20.66%	7,154
Grant	883	71.50%	121	9.80%	207	16.76%	19	1.54%	5	0.40%	676	54.74%	1,235
Greene	2,657	78.38%	502	14.81%	188	5.55%	25	0.74%	18	0.53%	2,155	63.57%	3,390
Hempstead	1,683	54.84%	386	12.58%	990	32.26%	6	0.20%	4	0.13%	693	22.58%	3,069
Hot Spring	1,932	69.90%	555	20.08%	261	9.44%	12	0.43%	4	0.14%	1,377	49.82%	2,764
Howard	1,250	75.67%	199	12.05%	190	11.50%	13	0.79%	0	0.00%	1,051	63.62%	1,652
Independence	2,340	66.08%	855	24.15%	330	9.32%	4	0.11%	12	0.34%	1,485	41.93%	3,541
Izard	1,283	81.93%	240	15.33%	36	2.30%	4	0.26%	3	0.19%	1,043	66.60%	1,566
Jackson	2,696	82.45%	338	10.34%	226	6.91%	8	0.24%	2	0.06%	2,358	72.11%	3,270
Jefferson	5,086	61.92%	1,176	14.32%	1,879	22.88%	49	0.60%	24	0.29%	3,207	39.04%	8,214
Johnson	1,565	69.59%	523	23.25%	138	6.14%	11	0.49%	12	0.53%	1,042	46.34%	2,249
Lafayette	700	49.16%	113	7.94%	578	40.59%	31	2.18%	2	0.14%	122	8.57%	1,424
Lawrence	2,001	74.89%	497	18.60%	151	5.65%	11	0.41%	12	0.45%	1,504	56.29%	2,672
Lee	528	35.41%	95	6.37%	866	58.08%	1	0.07%	1	0.07%	-338	-22.67%	1,491
Lincoln	1,108	65.91%	378	22.49%	188	11.18%	5	0.30%	2	0.12%	730	43.42%	1,681
Little River	900	59.06%	169	11.09%	447	29.33%	4	0.26%	4	0.26%	453	29.73%	1,524
Logan	2,130	66.73%	902	28.26%	143	4.48%	9	0.28%	8	0.25%	1,228	38.47%	3,192
Lonoke	2,065	69.04%	383	12.81%	535	17.89%	3	0.10%	5	0.17%	1,530	51.15%	2,991
Madison	2,041	47.50%	2,201	51.22%	39	0.91%	10	0.23%	6	0.14%	-160	-3.72%	4,297
Marion	1,133	72.58%	381	24.41%	31	1.99%	8	0.51%	8	0.51%	752	48.17%	1,561
Miller	2,850	62.24%	488	10.66%	1,223	26.71%	9	0.20%	9	0.20%	1,627	35.53%	4,579
Mississippi	3,763	59.40%	771	12.17%	1,769	27.92%	27	0.43%	5	0.08%	1,994	31.48%	6,335
Monroe	1,431	60.89%	299	12.72%	614	26.13%	1	0.04%	5	0.21%	817	34.76%	2,350
Montgomery	935	75.22%	236	18.99%	60	4.83%	5	0.40%	7	0.56%	699	56.23%	1,243
Nevada	1,140	64.33%	202	11.40%	418	23.59%	10	0.56%	2	0.11%	722	40.74%	1,772
Newton	848	48.51%	879	50.29%	13	0.74%	4	0.23%	4	0.23%	-31	-1.78%	1,748
Ouachita	3,315	68.80%	476	9.88%	1,023	21.23%	0	0.00%	4	0.08%	2,292	47.57%	4,818
Perry	731	67.00%	201	18.42%	156	14.30%	0	0.00%	3	0.27%	530	48.58%	1,091
Phillips	1,018	32.85%	351	11.33%	1,722	55.57%	4	0.13%	4	0.13%	-704	-22.72%	3,099
Pike	997	73.80%	256	18.95%	89	6.59%	8	0.59%	1	0.07%	741	54.85%	1,351
Poinsett	2,415	65.24%	435	11.75%	830	22.42%	13	0.35%	9	0.24%	1,585	42.82%	3,702
Polk	1,417	66.21%	554	25.89%	127	5.93%	28	1.31%	14	0.65%	863	40.32%	2,140
Pope	2,525	67.95%	764	20.56%	417	11.22%	5	0.13%	5	0.13%	1,761	47.39%	3,716
Prairie	1,020	60.79%	260	15.49%	379	22.59%	18	1.07%	1	0.06%	641	38.20%	1,678
Pulaski	13,120	53.25%	5,910	23.99%	5,443	22.09%	51	0.21%	115	0.47%	7,210	29.26%	24,639
Randolph	2,139	81.24%	377	14.32%	109	4.14%	4	0.15%	4	0.15%	1,762	66.92%	2,633
St. Francis	1,011	46.91%	178	8.26%	957	44.41%	4	0.19%	5	0.23%	54	2.50%	2,155
Saline	2,070	72.18%	390	13.60%	341	11.89%	49	1.71%	18	0.63%	1,680	58.58%	2,868
Scott	1,093	77.63%	260	18.47%	37	2.63%	14	0.99%	4	0.28%	833	59.16%	1,408
Searcy	1,205	51.81%	1,064	45.74%	44	1.89%	9	0.39%	4	0.17%	141	6.07%	2,326
Sebastian	5,075	57.36%	2,928	33.09%	777	8.78%	41	0.46%	27	0.31%	2,147	24.27%	8,848
Sevier	1,314	71.53%	267	14.53%	231	12.57%	21	1.14%	4	0.22%	1,047	57.00%	1,837
Sharp	1,078	74.19%	295	20.30%	71	4.89%	4	0.28%	5	0.34%	783	53.89%	1,453
Stone	1,186	61.80%	644	33.56%	76	3.96%	4	0.21%	9	0.47%	542	28.24%	1,919
Union	5,588	67.01%	1,039	12.46%	1,691	20.28%	11	0.13%	10	0.12%	3,897	46.73%	8,339
Van Buren	1,324	63.96%	617	29.81%	119	5.75%	4	0.19%	6	0.29%	707	34.15%	2,070
Washington	3,493	49.38%	2,859	40.42%	581	8.21%	85	1.20%	56	0.79%	634	8.96%	7,074
White	3,193	69.04%	833	18.01%	563	12.17%	20	0.43%	16	0.35%	2,360	51.03%	4,625
Woodruff	1,008	55.11%	207	11.32%	593	32.42%	16	0.87%	5	0.27%	415	22.69%	1,829
Yell	1,866	77.08%	408	16.85%	135	5.58%	0	0.00%	12	0.50%	1,458	60.23%	2,421
Totals	149,659	61.72%	50,959	21.02%	40,068	16.52%	1,037	0.43%	751	0.31%	98,700	40.70%	242,475

==== Counties that flipped from Republican to Democratic ====
- Benton
- Searcy

==== Counties that flipped from Democratic to Dixiecrat ====
- Crittenden
- Lee
- Phillips

== See also ==
- United States presidential elections in Arkansas

== Works cited ==
- Black, Earl; Black, Merle (1992). The Vital South: How Presidents Are Elected. Harvard University Press. ISBN 0674941306.
