= Harry Ashmore =

American journalist (1916–1998)

Harry S. Ashmore
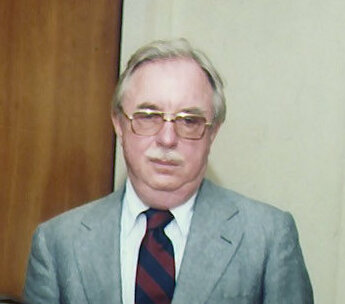
- Ashmore in the 1970s
- Born: Harry Scott Ashmore; July 28, 1916; Greenville, South Carolina, U.S.
- Died: January 20, 1998 (aged 81); Santa Barbara, California, U.S.
- Education: Clemson Agricultural College
- Occupation: Journalist
- Spouse: Barbara Edith Laier
- Awards: Pulitzer Prize (1957)

Harry Scott Ashmore (July 28, 1916 – January 20, 1998) was an American journalist who won a Pulitzer Prize for his editorials in 1957 on the school integration conflict in Little Rock, Arkansas.

== Early life and career ==
Ashmore was born in Greenville, South Carolina, on July 28, 1916. He attended Greenville Senior High School and Clemson Agricultural College where he graduated with a degree in general science in 1937. He showed an early ability in journalism, having served as editor of the student newspapers at both Greenville High School and Clemson College. After graduation from Clemson, Ashmore worked as a newspaper reporter, first at the Greenville Piedmont, and then at the Greenville News. In 1940, Ashmore married Barbara Edith Laier, a physical education teacher at Furman University. Ashmore was accepted for a Nieman Fellowship at Harvard University in 1941. When the United States entered World War II in December 1941, Ashmore left Harvard to join the United States Army, and served as an operations officer (reaching the rank of Lieutenant Colonel) with the Ninety-fifth Infantry Division, part of the United States Third Army. After the war, Harry Ashmore became the editorial writer at the Charlotte News (in Charlotte, North Carolina).

== Arkansas Gazette ==
In 1947 Ashmore was recruited to be the editorial writer at the Arkansas Gazette in Little Rock, Arkansas. He soon became the executive editor at the paper and gained a reputation as a moderate-to-liberal thinker. In 1951 Governor Sid McMath of Arkansas invited Ashmore to address the Southern Governors' Conference when it met at Hot Springs, Arkansas. Ashmore spoke to the governors on civil rights, a contentious subject in southern states, and newspapers around the United States reprinted the speech or excerpts from it.

Ashmore wrote the first of his eleven books in 1954. The Negro and the Schools was a report of a Ford Foundation study of segregated education in the South. It was published shortly before the United States Supreme Court handed down its decision ending school segregation in Brown v. Board of Education. Chief Justice Earl Warren later told Ashmore that the book was used as a source while drafting the 1955 implementation ruling known as Brown II.

Also in 1954, Ashmore came to the aid of Orval Faubus, who was running for Governor of Arkansas. Francis Cherry, the incumbent, had tried to smear Faubus by revealing that he had attended Commonwealth College, a socialist school in Arkansas. Faubus at first tried to deny the charge, but Cherry produced documentary evidence. Unhappy with Cherry's tactics, Ashmore ghostwrote a speech for Faubus to respond to the charges. The speech was successful and has been credited with saving Faubus's political career. In 1955, Ashmore took a leave of absence for a year to work on Adlai Stevenson's presidential campaign.

In 1957 the Federal courts ordered integration of the schools in the Little Rock School District, which started the Little Rock Crisis. Faubus defied the court order, but Ashmore editorialized for compliance with the law, which ended the friendship between them. Ashmore became a rallying point for moderates and liberals in Arkansas and a figure of hatred for segregationists, who labeled him a carpetbagger. In 1958, the Arkansas Gazette won the Pulitzer Prize for Public Service, For demonstrating the highest qualities of civic leadership, journalistic responsibility and moral courage in the face of great public tension during the school integration crisis of 1957. The newspaper's fearless and completely objective news coverage, as well as its reasoned and moderate policy, did much to restore calmness and order to an overwrought community, reflecting great credit on its editors and its management. In the same year Harry Ashmore won the Pulitzer Prize for Editorial Writing for the forcefulness, dispassionate analysis and clarity of his editorials on the school integration conflict in Little Rock.

In 1959, the Arkansas General Assembly passed a resolution to rename Toad Suck Ferry to Ashmore Landing. Governor Faubus vetoed the resolution on the grounds that the name change would defame a well-known landing.

== Later life ==
In 1959 Ashmore left the Arkansas Gazette and moved to Santa Barbara, California, where he joined the Center for the Study of Democratic Institutions. He served as President of the Center from 1969 to 1974. He also served as the editor-in-chief of the Encyclopædia Britannica from 1960 until 1963, and afterwards as Director of Editorial Research. Ashmore received the Robert F. Kennedy Book Award Lifetime Achievement Award for 1995-1996.

In 1967 and 1968 Harry Ashmore traveled to North Vietnam with Bill Baggs (editor of The Miami News) on a private peace mission. While there, they interviewed Ho Chi Minh about what conditions would be necessary to end the Vietnam War. He speaks about his experiences in the 1968 documentary film In the Year of the Pig.

In 1989, Ashmore published Unseasonable Truth: The Life of Robert Maynard Hutchins. It's a voluminous (49 chapters, 616 pages, 1,057 endnotes, 4-page bibliographic notes, and 30-page index) biography of former Yale Law Dean and University of Chicago President Robert Hutchins.

Harry Ashmore died in Santa Barbara, California on January 20, 1998.
