= Governor Cherry =

Governor Cherry may refer to:

- Francis Cherry (governor) (1908–1965), 35th Governor of Arkansas
- R. Gregg Cherry (1891–1957), 61st Governor of North Carolina
