= Nathan Green Gordon =

American politician

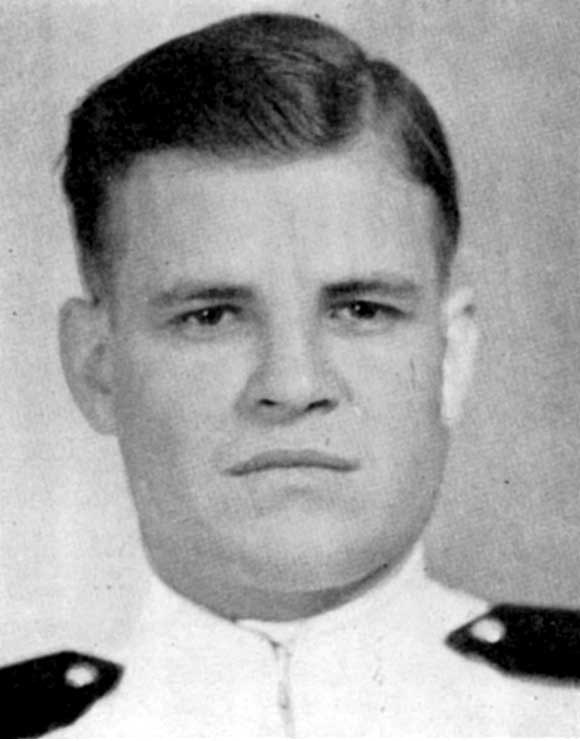

10th Lieutenant Governor of Arkansas
- In office January 14, 1947 – January 10, 1967
- Governor: Benjamin Travis Laney; Sid McMath; Francis Cherry; Orval Faubus
- Preceded by: James L. Shaver
- Succeeded by: Maurice Britt

Personal details
- Born: September 4, 1916 Morrilton, Arkansas, U.S.
- Died: September 8, 2008 (aged 92) Little Rock, Arkansas, U.S.
- Resting place: Elmwood Cemetery, Morrilton, Arkansas
- Party: Democratic
- Profession: Lawyer

Military service
- Allegiance: United States
- Branch/service: United States Navy
- Years of service: 1941–1945
- Rank: Lieutenant
- Unit: VP-34 "Black Cats"
- Battles/wars: World War II
- Awards: Medal of Honor; Distinguished Flying Cross (2); Air Medal (6)

Nathan Green Gordon (September 4, 1916 – September 8, 2008) was an American lawyer, politician, and decorated naval aviator. A Democrat, he served as the tenth lieutenant governor of Arkansas for ten terms, from 1947 to 1967. As a United States Navy officer in World War II, he received the U.S. military's highest decoration—the Medal of Honor—for rescuing the crews of several downed airplanes.

== Early life ==
Gordon was born in Morrilton, the seat of Conway County in central Arkansas, to Edward Gordon and the former Ada Ruth Bearden. After attending Morrilton public schools through the 10th grade, he graduated from Columbia Military Academy in Columbia, Tennessee, in 1933, where he was salutatorian. Gordon then went on to college at Arkansas Polytechnic College in Russellville. While enrolled in Arkansas Polytechnic College, he enlisted in Battery D, 206th Coast Artillery, Arkansas Army National Guard. Following graduation, he attended law school at the University of Arkansas in Fayetteville. While attending law school Gordon joined Sigma Nu fraternity and served as chapter president. He graduated with a Juris Doctor degree in 1939.

== World War II ==
Gordon practiced law in his hometown of Morrilton before joining the Navy in May 1941. After qualifying as a naval aviator, he was sent to the Southwest Pacific Ocean, where he would serve for more than two years. He joined Patrol Squadron 34, nicknamed the "Black Cats", a PBY Catalina patrol and rescue squadron based at Samarai Advanced Seaplane Base in Milne Bay, New Guinea.

By February 15, 1944, he was a lieutenant, junior grade, in command of a Catalina, Bureau Number 08139, which he nicknamed Arkansas Traveler. On that day, Gordon rescued 15 survivors of several downed aircraft of the United States Army Air Forces, for which he was awarded the Medal of Honor. That day, the Fifth Air Force attacked Kavieng on the island of New Ireland. The mission consisted of four squadrons of A-20 Havocs from the 3rd Bombardment Group that attacked shipping in the harbor, and seven squadrons of B-25s from the 38th and 345th Groups that bombed facilities along the harbor front. Accurate anti-aircraft fire shot down eight of the low-level strafers.

Gordon's PBY Catalina, Arkansas Traveler, was on station near Witu, escorted by four P-47 Thunderbolts of the 348th Fighter Group. In one of the "most striking rescues of the war," he made four separate landings and take-offs under Japanese fire. On his first landing, endangered by waves that were breaking 16 to 18 feet high, he searched for the crew of a downed A-20 without locating survivors. The aircraft was severely stressed and took on water from numerous burst seams.

After taking off, Gordon was directed twice to pick up nine men of two B-25s that had ditched, forced to shut down one or both engines to effect the rescues, while two other B-25s strafed the Japanese gun positions to suppress their fire. After the PBY started back to base and its fighter escorts had departed, low on fuel, one of the B-25s spotted two rafts and called back the rescue aircraft. Despite heavy seas and a damaged aircraft, Lt.(j.g.) Gordon executed another landing only 600 yards from shore, overflying Japanese gun positions at low level to land, and picked up an additional six airmen. His final takeoff with 24 men aboard was with a dangerously overloaded aircraft, but he managed to keep the Catalina's nose up until he reached flying speed without nosing over in the rough seas.

Gordon received the Medal of Honor in September 1944, and his crew of eight each received the Silver Star. He was subsequently promoted to lieutenant, and served in the navy until 1945, when he was released from active duty.

== Post-war ==
After the war, Gordon formed a business partnership with his brother, Edward Gordon, Jr., and returned to the practice of law in Morrilton. His political career began in 1946, when he was elected Lieutenant Governor of Arkansas under Governor Benjamin Travis Laney. He took office in January 1947 and was re-elected to nine more two-year terms, finally leaving office in January 1967. During his tenure, he served under four different Governors: Laney (1945–1949), Sid McMath (1949–1953), Francis Cherry (1953–1955), and Orval Faubus (1955–1967).

Gordon did not seek reelection in 1966, with Maurice L. Britt winning the election against James Pilkinton.

The Arkansas Aviation Historical Society selected Gordon in 1980 as one of five initial inductees in the Arkansas Aviation Hall of Fame.

== Medal of Honor citation ==
Lieutenant Gordon's official Medal of Honor citation reads:

For extraordinary heroism above and beyond the call of duty as commander of a Catalina patrol plane in rescuing personnel of the U.S. Army 5th Air Force shot down in combat over Kavieng Harbor in the Bismarck Sea, February 15, 1944. On air alert in the vicinity of Vitu Islands, Lt. (then Lt. j.g.) Gordon unhesitatingly responded to a report of the crash and flew boldly into the harbor, defying close-range fire from enemy shore guns to make 3 separate landings in full view of the Japanese and pick up 9 men, several of them injured. With his cumbersome flying boat dangerously overloaded, he made a brilliant takeoff despite heavy swells and almost total absence of wind and set a course for base, only to receive the report of another group stranded in a rubber life raft 600 yards from the enemy shore. Promptly turning back, he again risked his life to set his plane down under direct fire of the heaviest defenses of Kavieng and take aboard 6 more survivors, coolly making his fourth dexterous takeoff with 15 rescued officers and men. By his exceptional daring, personal valor, and incomparable airmanship under most perilous conditions, Lieutenant Gordon prevented the certain death or capture of our airmen by the Japanese.

== See also ==
- List of Medal of Honor recipients for World War II

Political offices
Preceded by James L. Shaver	Lieutenant Governor of Arkansas; 1947–1967	Succeeded by Maurice Britt
