= Adrian Walker (journalist) =

American journalist

- Occupation: Columnist

Adrian Walker is an American journalist. He is a metro columnist for The Boston Globe. His column appears in the Metro section of the Globe on Mondays and Fridays.

== Career ==
A native of Miami, Walker, who is African-American, began his career at The Miami News, which folded in 1988. Walker began working as a Metro columnist in 1998. At the Globe he is responsible for covering local and regional news along with society and culture. He contributed to the Spotlight Team series “Boston. Racism. Image. Reality”, a finalist for the Pulitzer Prize for Local Reporting in 2018. Prior to becoming a columnist, he covered local news as well as state and local politics. He was also the paper's deputy political editor from 1995 to 1997. Walker was named an associate editor of the Globe in 2021.
