= 1962 Arkansas gubernatorial election =

- November 6, 1962
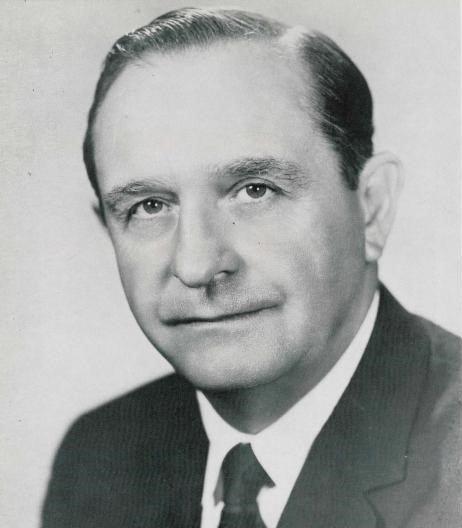

Nominee	Orval Faubus	Willis Ricketts
Party	Democratic	Republican
Popular vote	225,743	82,349
Percentage	73.27%	26.73%
- County results Faubus: 50–60% 60–70% 70–80% 80–90% >90%
Governor before election
Orval Faubus
Democratic
Elected Governor
Orval Faubus
Democratic

The 1962 Arkansas gubernatorial election was held on November 6, 1962.

Incumbent Democratic Governor Orval Faubus won election to a fifth term, defeating Republican nominee Willis Ricketts with 73.27% of the vote.

== Primary elections ==
Primary elections were held on July 31, 1962. By winning over 50% of the vote, Faubus avoided a run-off which would have been held on August 14, 1962.

=== Democratic primary ===
==== Candidates ====
- Dale Alford, U.S. Representative for Arkansas's 5th congressional district
- Kenneth Coffelt, attorney and former state senator
- David A. Cox, farmer
- Orval Faubus, incumbent Governor
- Sid McMath, former Governor
- Vernon H. Whitten, businessman

==== Results ====
Results map of the Democratic primary by county. Faubus: 30–40% 40–50% 50–60% 60–70% 70–80% 80–90% <90% McMath: 40–50%

Democratic primary results
Party	Candidate	Votes	%
Democratic	Orval Faubus (incumbent)	208,996	51.59
Democratic	Sid McMath	83,473	20.61
Democratic	Dale Alford	82,815	20.44
Democratic	Vernon H. Whitten	22,377	5.52
Democratic	Kenneth Coffelt	5,302	1.31
Democratic	David A. Cox	2,149	0.53
Total votes		405,112	100.00

=== Republican primary ===
==== Candidates ====
- Willis Ricketts, Pharmacist and former president of the Arkansas Jaycees

==== Results ====
Republican primary results
Party	Candidate	Votes	%
Republican	Willis Ricketts		unopposed

== General election ==
=== Candidates ===
- Orval Faubus, Democratic
- Willis Ricketts, Republican

=== Results ===
1962 Arkansas gubernatorial election
Party	Candidate	Votes	%	±%
Democratic	Orval Faubus (incumbent)	225,743	73.27%	+4.06%
Republican	Willis Ricketts	82,349	26.73%	−4.06%
Majority		143,394	46.54%	
Turnout		308,092	100.00%	
Democratic hold		Swing		

== Bibliography ==
- Gubernatorial Elections, 1787-1997. Washington, D.C.: Congressional Quarterly Inc. 1998. ISBN 1-56802-396-0.
- Scammon, Richard M., ed. (1964). America Votes 5: a handbook of contemporary American election statistics, 1962. Pittsburgh, PA: Governmental Affairs Institute.
