= Bill Baggs =

American journalist and editor

William Calhoun Baggs (b. 1923–1969) was an American journalist and editor of The Miami News (1957 to 1969). He was one of a small group of Southern newspaper editors who campaigned for civil rights for African Americans in the 1950s and 1960s. Baggs became an early opponent of the Vietnam War.

== Early life and education ==
William Calhoun Baggs, called "Bill", was born in Atlanta, Georgia, and grew up in Colquitt, Georgia in Miller County near the Georgia-Alabama border. He attended Miller County High School, which was still racially segregated at the time. There, he edited the school newspaper and lettered in numerous sports. His classmates voted him valedictorian of the 1941 graduating class. He turned down an appointment to the U.S. Naval Academy and, instead, moved to the Panama Canal Zone with his sister and brother-in-law.

== Career ==
Baggs started work in journalism as a reporter for the Panama Star and Herald. In 1942, he volunteered for the U.S. Army Air Force and served with the 485th Heavy Bomb Group (830th Squadron) of the Fifteenth Air Force in Venosa, Italy. As a bombardier, he earned a Distinguished Flying Cross and a Unit Citation. During a period of rest and reassignment in Miami Beach, Florida, he fell in love with the growing city of Miami as well as a Red Cross Recreational Assistant named Joan Orr, who later would become his wife. He worked briefly as a cub reporter in Greensboro, N.C., before returning to Miami as the aviation reporter for the Miami News. He was named a columnist in December 1949, and distinguished himself for taking progressive stands on civil rights, economic investment in Latin America to combat the rise of communism, and preserving the environment. As a columnist, he traveled extensively in Latin America and Europe and throughout the United States. He built strong friendships with world leaders as well as high-ranking politicians, such as Adlai Stevenson, and brothers John F. and Robert Kennedy.

In July 1957, publisher James M. Cox Jr. named Baggs editor of the Miami News. He held that position until his death at age 45 on January 7, 1969.

== Latin America ==
During his tenure, his newspaper had a front seat to the Cuban Revolution, Bay of Pigs Invasion, and the Cuban Missile Crisis. His friendship with President Kennedy gave him advanced knowledge of the Soviet Union's buildup of missile launch sites on the island. Later, though, when he was asked by a Time magazine reporter how his newspaper scooped both the announcement as well as the turning back of Soviet ships, Baggs answered, "A roseate spoonbill told us."

An active anti-Communist, Baggs published numerous anti-Castro editorials and articles during the early days of the Fidel Castro regime in Cuba, beginning in 1959. Baggs cultivated numerous news sources from within the anti-Castro Soldier-of-Fortune community in South Florida, including Gerry Patrick Hemming, Roy Hargraves, Eddie Collins and William Whatley, as well as Alex Rorke and several others. He also worked with Frank Sturgis and Bernard Barker to develop news leads and sources about the South Florida anti-Castro exile community long before they were involved with the 1970s Watergate scandal.

Baggs regularly talked with South Florida CIA case officers, such as David Atlee Phillips and E. Howard Hunt, on various topics related to the intrigues among South Florida anti-Castro Cuban exiles. One of his reporters, Hal Hendrix, known as "the spook" at The Miami News, broke the story about the alleged coup d'état against Juan Bosch of the Dominican Republic, the day before it happened. This was embarrassing for the CIA and Miami News, but also for Hendrix.

Civil Rights As African Americans increased their activism in the civil rights movement, Baggs was among a small group of white Southern editors who supported them and covered events in the South. Others in this group included Ralph McGill at The Atlanta Constitution, Hodding Carter at the Greenville Delta Democrat-Times, and Harry Ashmore at the Arkansas Gazette.

In the 1960s, Baggs became increasingly opposed to the United States involvement in the Vietnam War. In 1967 and 1968 he traveled to North Vietnam with Harry Ashmore, editor of the Arkansas Gazette, on a private peace mission. While there, they interviewed the North Vietnamese premier, Ho Chi Minh, about what he needed to end the war.

Baggs was a longtime supporter of liberal Democrats such as Rep. Claude Pepper and Rep. Dante Fascell. He wrote numerous articles and editorials supporting legislation to help the numerous retirees who were already dominating the population in South Florida. They represented the core readership base of the Miami News. He was often criticized for his support of civil rights, opposition to the Vietnam War, and promotion of social welfare programs for the elderly, the infirm and the disadvantaged in South Florida and throughout the nation.

Baggs supported early pioneering conservation efforts to rescue the southeast section of Key Biscayne from overdevelopment by real estate developers. The Bill Baggs Cape Florida State Park was named in his honor on land protected from development.

In 2004 a large sign was installed at the park, recognizing the site as part of the National Underground Railroad Network to Freedom: eyewitness accounts documented hundreds of slaves and Black Seminoles escaping from here to go to freedom in the Bahamas in the early 1820s; 300 were recorded in 1823. Construction of a staffed lighthouse at Cape Florida in 1825 cut off this escape route.

Bill Baggs died of viral pneumonia and influenza on January 7, 1969, at the age of 45.

He had often been the first employee to arrive every morning before 5:30 A.M. and the last one to leave at night after 6:00 P.M. after the paper had been published and distributed to be available for rush-hour traffic. Starting at 4:00 P.M., newsboys hawked the paper at traffic lights throughout South Florida. Bill Baggs had greatly admired President John F. Kennedy and was noticeably saddened after his assassination in 1963. The editor's close associates said that he was never the same after the death of his longtime friend and political hero.

== See also ==
- Bill Baggs Cape Florida State Park

== Bibliography ==
- Teel, Leonard Ray. 2003. "Mott winner recounts research", Kappa Tau Alpha Newsletter, Vol. 20, No. 1, Winter 2003
- 1958 Profile of Bill Baggs, Time magazine
