= Dary Matera =

American writer

Dary Matera (born 1955) is an author who specializes in real-life casebooks. He is from Chandler, Arizona.

Matera grew up in Bangkok, Thailand, and Angeles City, Philippines, as the son of a Voice of America foreign service officer. He attended junior high at the International School of Bangkok, and then transferred to Wagner High School on Clark Air Force Base in the Philippines.

After returning to America and graduating from the University of Miami in 1977, Matera worked as a reporter for The Miami News (1977–82). He covered the city beats—education, crime, politics and general assignment.

Matera became an independent author in 1986. His first mass market, non-fiction book, Are You Lonesome Tonight?, detailed the controversial story of Elvis Presley's lifelong relationship with a troubled Louisiana woman.

Matera has appeared in a half dozen television documentaries, including programs on The FBI's Top Ten Most Wanted, 1930s bank robber John Dillinger, 1960s cult leader Charles Manson, and 1970s giant serial killer Ed Kemper. Matera has also appeared in 9 episodes of the television show America: Fact vs Fiction which airs on the American Heroes channel.

His other books include:

- Get Me Ellis Rubin! -- The Life, Times and Cases of a Maverick Lawyer. (St. Martin's Press, 1989). It was published in paperback by St. Martin's Press under the title For the Defense in June 1991.
- Quitting The Mob - How the Yuppie Don Left the Mafia and Lived to Tell His Story. (HarperCollins, 1992)
- What's In It For Me? - How an Ex-Wise Guy Exposed the Greed, Jealousy and Lust That Drive Arizona Politics. (HarperCollins, 1992)
- Taming The Beast – Charles Manson’s Life Behind Bars. (St. Martin's Press, 1998) Republished in 2020 under the title "Charles Manson - Conversations with a Killer."
- Strike Midnight -- a novel (Vine Books, 1994).
- Angels of Emergency—Rescue Stories From America's Paramedics and EMTs. (HarperCollins, July 1996).
- The Pena Files—Dramatic Cases From The World's Top PI. (Regan Books {HarperCollins imprint} August 1996).
- Among Grizzlies, (ghosted) (HarperCollins, Spring 1997).
- Childlight – How Children Reach Out to Their Parents From the Beyond. (New Horizon Press, Spring, 2001).
- A Cry for Character – How a Group of Kids Cleaned Up Their Rowdy School and Provided the Antidote to Columbine. (Prentice Hall/Penguin, Summer, 2001).
- The FBI's Most Wanted, (William Morrow/HarperTorch, Fall, 2003).
- John Dillinger – The Life and Death of America’s First Celebrity Criminal. (Carroll-Graf, Spring, 2004).
- Stolen Masterpiece Tracker – The Dangerous Life of the FBI’s Number 1 Art Sleuth (Barricade Books, 2006)
- "MacArthur's Children - They Lost Their Innocence, In Every Way Imaginable" Novel (Kindle edition, 2010)
- Charles Manson - Conversations with a Killer (Barns & Noble/Sterling, 2019)
- Ed Kemper - The Coed Killer (Conversations with a Killer series, Barns & Noble/Sterling, 2021)
