= Don Wright (cartoonist) =

American editorial cartoonist (1934–2024)

- Born: Don Conway Wright; January 23, 1934 Los Angeles, California, U.S.
- Died: March 24, 2024 (aged 90) West Palm Beach, Florida, U.S.
- Area: Editorial cartoonist

Don Conway Wright (January 23, 1934 – March 24, 2024) was an American editorial cartoonist. He was the winner of two Pulitzer Prizes, having received one in 1966 and a second in 1980.

== Biography ==
Don Conway Wright was born on January 23, 1934, in Los Angeles, California. When he was a child Wright and his family moved across the United States, to Florida. Wright graduated from Miami Edison High School in 1952. He had a job as a copyboy at the Miami News, from 1952 to 1956, which gave Wright his avid interest in cartoons.

Wright died in West Palm Beach, Florida on March 24, 2024, at the age of 90.

== Career ==
While the Miami News refused to give Wright a job in the art department, in case he was drafted in the war, the newspaper did give him a job as a photographer. Shortly after, Wright was drafted and served in the U.S. Army as a photographer, before returning to the Miami News as its graphics editor in 1958. Shortly after rejoining the Miami News, Wright resigned. Not wishing to lose Wright, the Miami News offered to publish some of his cartoons. By 1963, Wright's editorial cartoons, on local issues, were regular features on the newspaper's editorial page.

While at The Miami News, Wright frequently played pranks on other reporters, particularly humorous columnist John Keasler. Wright's colleagues returned the favor. Wright would toss his keys on his desk when he came in each evening. When Wright would leave his office for lunch or the restroom, they would slip an extra key on the keyring. After a while, the keyring grew so heavy that Wright swore and exclaimed, "What the hell! I don't even know what some of these keys are for!".

Wright continued to work for The Miami News until it ceased publication in 1988.

In 1989, Wright moved to The Palm Beach Post where he worked until his retirement in August 2008. Wright's work has been syndicated by both the Washington (DC) Star and The New York Times. As of 2012, Wright continued to draw editorial cartoons distributed by Tribune Media Services.

== Books ==
His cartoons have been published in at least two books: Wright On! A Collection of Political Cartoons (1971) and Wright Side Up (1981).

== Awards ==
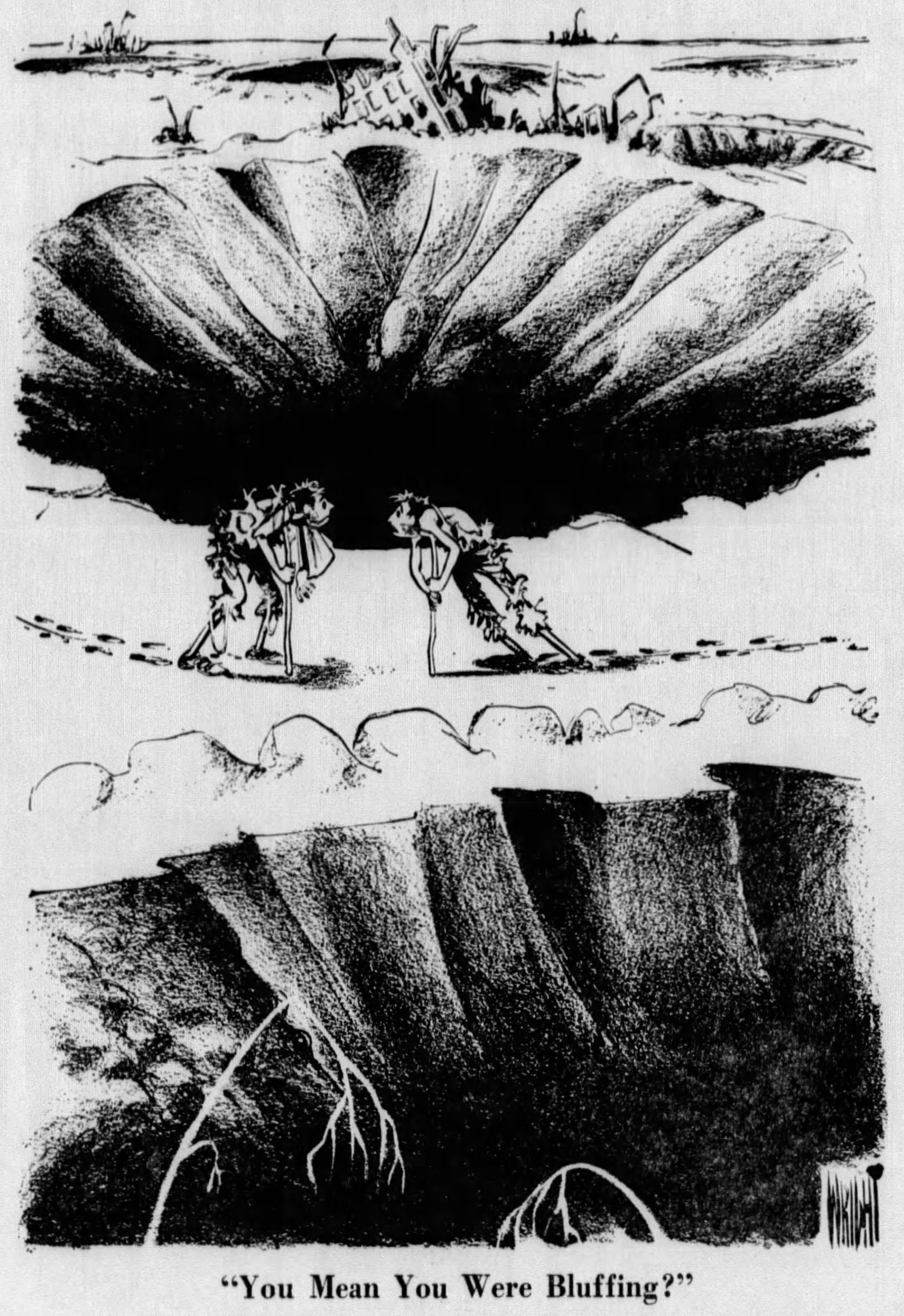
"You Mean You Were Bluffing?", for which Wright received the 1966 Pulitzer Prize

Wright received the Pulitzer Prize for Editorial Cartooning in 1966, for his cartoon "You Mean You Were Bluffing?", and another in 1980. Wright won the National Cartoonist Society Editorial Cartoon Award for 1985. He won the Sigma Delta Chi Award for Distinguished Service in Journalism twice.

Wright also won the Inter American Press Award three times, the Overseas Press Club Award five times, the Robert F. Kennedy Memorial Journalism Award twice, the National Headliner Award and the Best of Cox Award twice.
