= John Keasler =

American journalist (1921–1995)

- Born: John Irvin Keasler; August 3, 1921
- Died: September 5, 1995 (aged 74); Plant City, Florida, U.S.
- Occupation: Newspaper columnist

John Irvin Keasler (August 3, 1921 – September 5, 1995) was an American newspaper columnist for The Miami News, which folded in 1988.

Keasler grew up in Plant City, Florida, which is 26 miles east of Tampa. He got his start in journalism with a newsletter he penned while serving in World War II. He parlayed the newsletter into a job with the Plant City Courier. From there, he moved on to the larger Tampa Tribune and then to The Atlanta Journal-Constitution and the St. Louis Post-Dispatch before settling in for decades at The Miami News. While at the Post-Dispatch, Keasler was one of the founders in 1956 of the Catfish Club, which eventually became the Press Club of Metropolitan St. Louis.

During his 30-year career, Keasler covered both the assassination of President John F. Kennedy and the 1969 Moon landing. Keasler's 7,000 mostly humorous columns about South Florida life were a great favorite, some of which were collected into books. Keasler also enjoyed playing pranks on his fellow reporters, including some at the rival Miami Herald. He and cartoonist Don Wright, who won two Pulitzer Prizes while at The Miami News, in particular played tricks on one another.

When the News folded, no one was more distraught than Keasler. "I feel half numb, like I've got a head full of cold Crisco," he said at the time. "The News was a living thing with a heart and a soul, and it's dying."

Keasler's satirical novel, Surrounded on Three Sides, first published in 1958, remains in print.

He died in Plant City, Florida, in 1995, at the age of 74.

A scholarship to the University of Miami for a student majoring in print journalism, the John and Marjorie Keasler Journalism Scholarship, is given in his memory.
