= The Miami News =

Daily newspaper in Miami, Florida

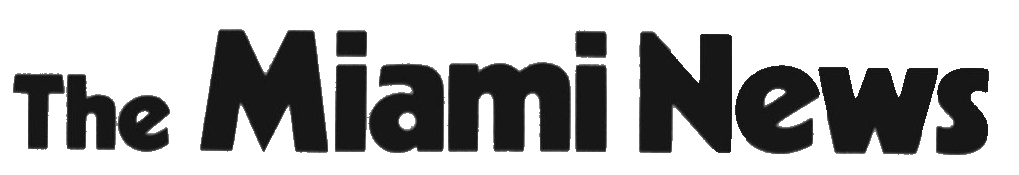

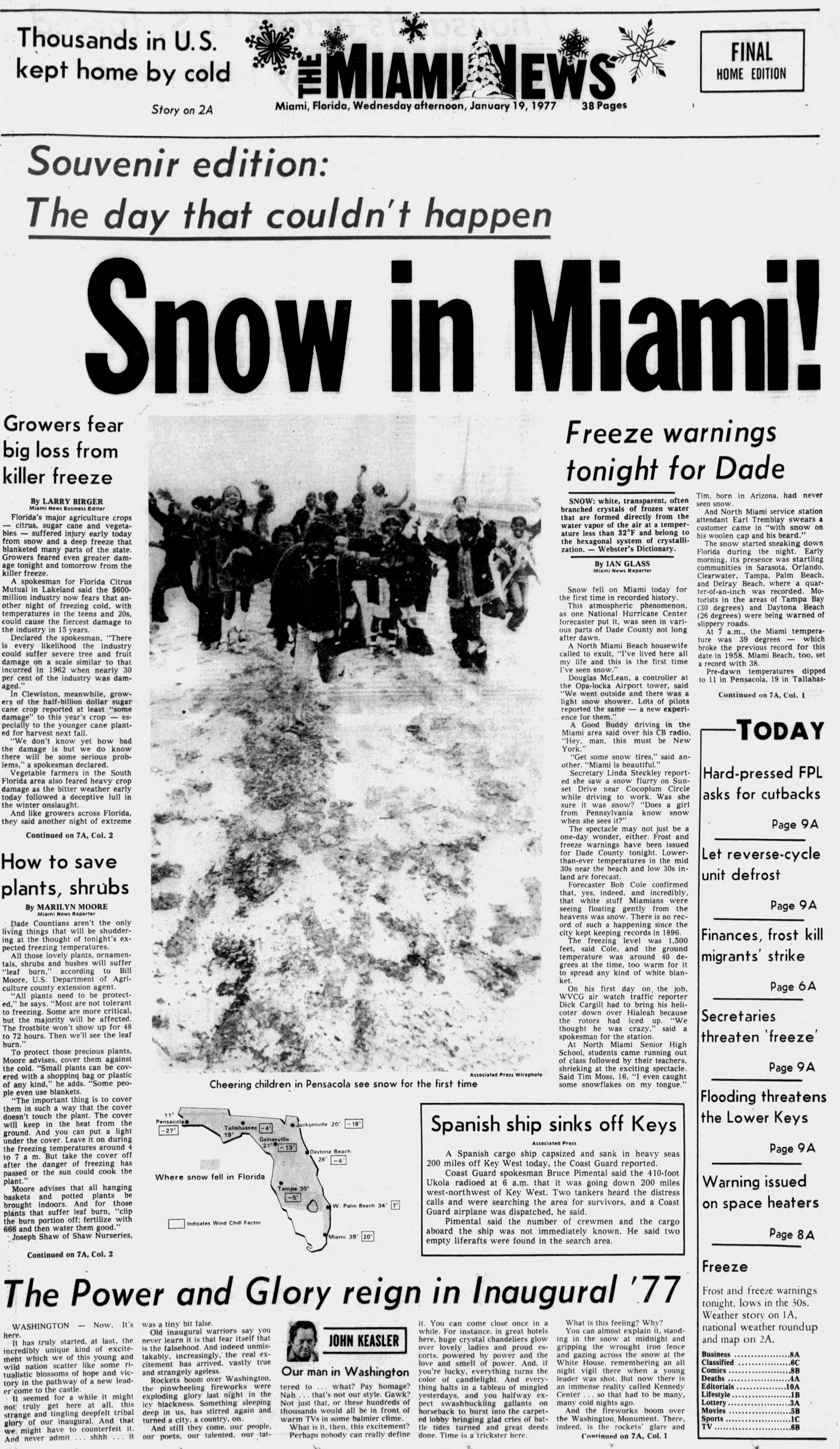
- Front page on January 19, 1977, after a rare snow in Florida
- Type: Daily evening newspaper
- Format: Broadsheet
- Owner: Cox Enterprises (Cox Media Group)
- Founded: May 15, 1896 (as The Miami Metropolis)
- Ceased publication: December 31, 1988
- Headquarters: Miami News Tower (1925–57); One Herald Plaza (1973–88), Miami, Florida, U.S.
- OCLC number: 10000467

The Miami News was an evening newspaper in Miami, Florida. It was the media market competitor to the morning edition of the Miami Herald for most of the 20th century. The paper started publishing in May 1896 as a weekly called The Miami Metropolis.

== History ==
=== 19th century ===
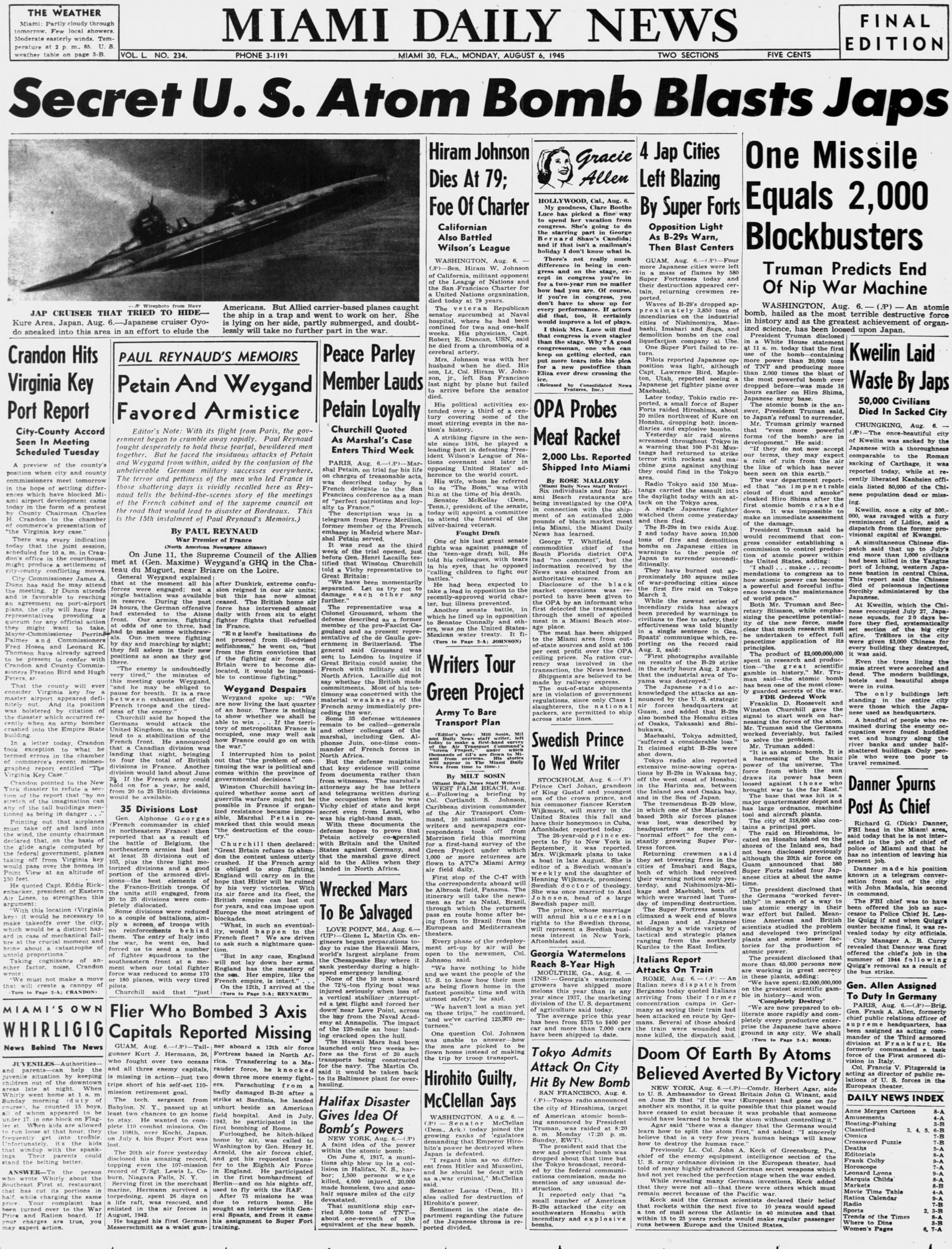
The Miami Daily News front page on August 6, 1945, reporting on the atomic bombings of Hiroshima and Nagasaki

The Miami News was founded as The Miami Metropolis in 1896, and published under that name until 1908. Walter S. Graham served as the newspaper's first editor.

=== 20th century ===
In 1903, the Metropolis became a daily newspaper, except Sundays, eight pages in length.

On April 18, 1923, former Ohio governor James M. Cox bought the Metropolis and renamed it the Miami Daily News-Metropolis. On January 4, 1925, the newspaper became the Miami Daily News, and published its first Sunday edition.

In 1957, the newspaper shortened its name to The Miami News.

Cox had a new building erected for the newspaper, the Miami News Tower, which was dedicated on July 25, 1925. The building was later renamed and repurposed as the Freedom Tower. Also on July 25, 1925, the News published a 508-page edition, which still holds the record for the largest page-count for a newspaper.

The Miami News was edited by Bill Baggs from 1957 until his death in 1969. After that, it was edited by Sylvan Meyer until 1973. Its final editor was Howard Kleinberg, a longtime staffer and author of a comprehensive history of the newspaper. The paper had the distinction of posting its own demise on the final obituary page.

In 1966, the Miami News moved in with the Knight Ridder-owned Miami Herald into a new, state-of-the-art building at One Herald Plaza, sharing production facilities with its morning rival while maintaining a separate editorial staff. A 30-year joint operating agreement inked in 1966 made the Herald responsible for all non-editorial aspects of production, including circulation, advertising and promotion.

Citing losses of $9 million per year and declining circulation, from 112,000 in 1966 to 48,000 in 1988 while households in the Dade County area grew 80 percent, Cox put the paper on the market in the fall of 1988. No suitable buyer came forward to save The Miami News, and it ceased publication on December 31, 1988.

Some of the newspaper's staff and all of its assets and archives were moved to nearby Cox publication The Palm Beach Post, now owned by Gannett, in West Palm Beach, and a small selection of photographs were donated to the Archives and Research Center of HistoryMiami.

== Notable employees ==
Notable former employees include Dorothy Misener Jurney, journalist and author Helen Muir, Pulitzer Prize-winning cartoonist Don Wright, Boston Globe columnist Adrian Walker, photographer Michael O'Brien, columnist John Keasler, and best-selling author Dary Matera, who served as a general assignment reporter from 1977 until 1982.

== Pulitzer Prizes ==
Over its existence, The Miami News was awarded five Pulitzer Prizes:

- 1939 – public service, for its campaign for the recall of the Miami City Commission
- 1959 – national reporting, Howard Van Smith, for a series of articles that focused public notice on deplorable conditions in a Florida migrant labor camp, resulted in the provision of generous assistance for the 4,000 stranded workers in the camp, and thereby called attention to the national problem presented by 1,500,000 migratory laborers.
- 1963 – international reporting, Hal Hendrix, for his persistent reporting which revealed, at an early stage, that the Soviet Union was installing missile launching pads in Cuba and sending in large numbers of MIG-21 aircraft.
- 1966 – editorial cartooning, Don Wright, for "You Mean You Were Bluffing?"
- 1980 – editorial cartooning, Don Wright
