= Kasler =

Kasler is a surname of Germanic origins. Today, the Kasler name is most commonly found in Hungary, Northern Italy and Romania.

Notable people with the surname include:

- Miklós Kásler (1950–2025), Hungarian oncologist, professor, director of the National Institute of Oncology, Minister of Human Resources of Hungary
- Horst Käsler (1926–1987), German handball player
- James H. Kasler (1926–2014), American military personnel
