= 1950 Arkansas gubernatorial election =

- November 7, 1950
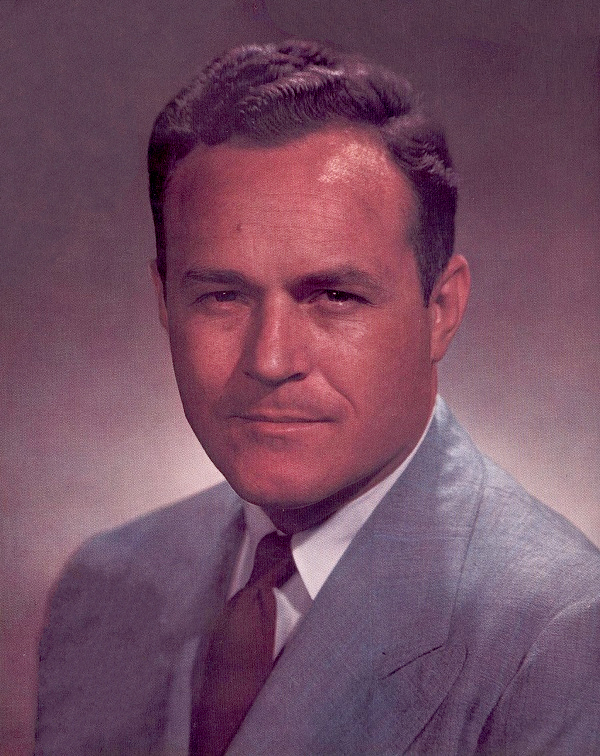

Nominee	Sid McMath	Jefferson W. Speck
Party	Democratic	Republican
Popular vote	266,778	50,309
Percentage	84.13%	15.87%
- County results McMath: 50–60% 60–70% 70–80% 80–90% >90%
Governor before election
Sid McMath
Democratic
Elected Governor
Sid McMath
Democratic

The 1950 Arkansas gubernatorial election was held on November 7, 1950.

Incumbent Democratic Governor Sid McMath defeated Republican nominee Jefferson W. Speck with 84.13% of the vote.

== Primary elections ==
Primary elections were held on July 25, 1950.

=== Democratic primary ===
==== Candidates ====
- M. G. Bankston
- J. T. Harris
- Benjamin Travis Laney, former Governor
- Sid McMath, incumbent Governor

==== Results ====
Democratic primary results
Party	Candidate	Votes	%
Democratic	Sid McMath (incumbent)	209,559	63.98
Democratic	Benjamin Travis Laney	112,651	34.39
Democratic	J. T. Harris	4,069	1.24
Democratic	M. G. Bankston	1,280	0.39
Total votes		327,559	100.00

== General election ==
=== Candidates ===
- Sid McMath, Democratic
- Jefferson W. Speck, Republican, planter and businessman

=== Results ===
1950 Arkansas gubernatorial election
Party	Candidate	Votes	%	±%
Democratic	Sid McMath (incumbent)	266,778	84.13%	−5.24%
Republican	Jefferson W. Speck	50,309	15.87%	+5.24%
Majority		216,469	68.26%	
Turnout		317,087	100.00%	
Democratic hold		Swing		

== Bibliography ==
- Gubernatorial Elections, 1787-1997. Washington, D.C.: Congressional Quarterly Inc. 1998. ISBN 1-56802-396-0.
