= Samarai Advanced Seaplane Base =

World War 2 Seaplane base

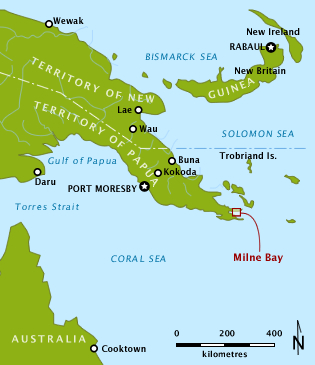
Samarai Advanced Seaplane Base was just south of the mouth of Milne Bay, supported by the Naval Base Milne Bay

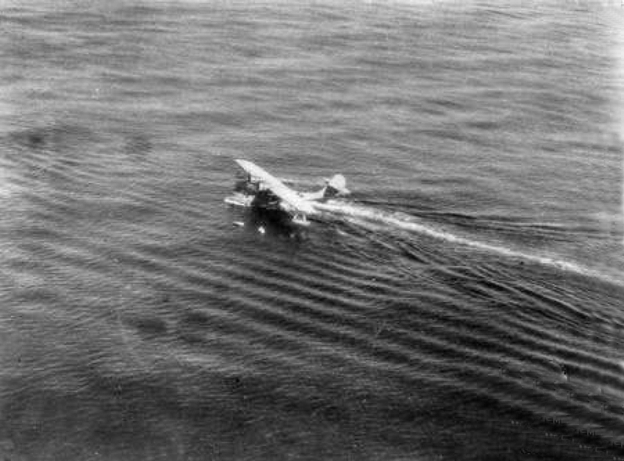
Samarai PBY Catalina rescues a RAAF pilot from Solomon Sea in 1944

Samarai Advanced Seaplane Base was a US Navy seaplane base at Samarai Island, Papua New Guinea during World War II.

The advanced seaplane base was built by a detachment of the 84th Naval Construction Battalion with help from members of USS San Pablo (AVP-30), a seaplane tender. The base was built within 42 days and included a 50 feet (15 m) ramp, small hangar, 40,000 square feet (3,700 m^{2}) apron, barrack accommodation for 270 men and four 1,000 barrel aviation fuel tanks.

The seaplane tenders sailors worked around the clock to fuel, repair, arm, control the seaplanes, feed and care for the PBY Catalina crews.

Operations from the base included attacking enemy shipping along the coasts of New Guinea, New Britain, New Ireland, and the Bismarck Sea. Heavy losses were inflicted upon Imperial Japanese inter-island barge traffic and shipping. The aircraft harassed enemy troops with night bombing and strafing missions, conducted photo intelligence operations, provided air-sea search and rescue support for downed allied pilots and sailors of sunken vessels. They also transported high-ranking officers, friendly coast watchers, and native guerrilla units.

Samarai Seaplane Base was located on Samarai Island at 10.610046°S 150.661993°E. The seaplane base shore facilities were on Sariba Island, just to the east of Samarai Island at 10.596838°S 150.687925°E. On Sariba Island Seabee built a camp for 270 troops, a small boat pier, communication center, headquarters, mess hall, and aviation-gasoline tank farm, supply depot.

The base also operated a crash boat base at the camp, with Rescue Boat C-9485. The seaplane base was part of Naval Base Milne Bay. By May 1945 the base was too far away from the action, and was packed up by the Seabee and moved to more forward bases in the Philippines and Okinawa.

== Units Based at Samari Advanced Seaplane Base ==
- Patrol Squadron Thirty Three (VP-33), Fleet Air Wing 17 (PBY Catalina)
- Patrol Squadron Thirty Four (VP-34), Fleet Air Wing 17 (PBY Catalina)
- Patrol Squadron One Hundred One (VP-101), Fleet Air Wing 17 (PBY Catalina)
- USS San Pablo (AVP-30) (Seaplane tender)
- USS Half Moon (AVP-26) (Seaplane tender)

== See also ==
- U.S. Naval Base Subic Bay
- Espiritu Santo Naval Base
- US Naval Advance Bases
- Naval Advance Base Saipan
- Battle of Milne Bay order of battle
