= Sid McMath =

34th governor of Arkansas (1912–2003)

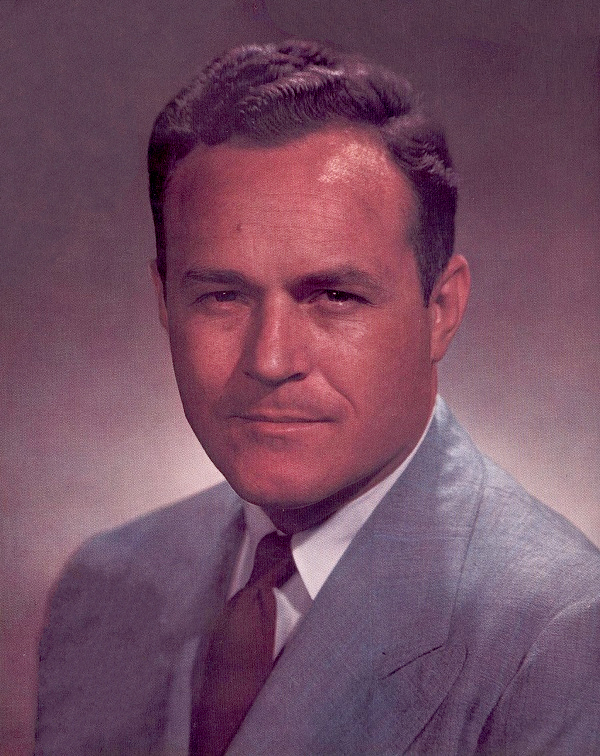

34th Governor of Arkansas
- In office January 11, 1949 – January 13, 1953
- Lieutenant: Nathan Green Gordon
- Preceded by: Benjamin Travis Laney
- Succeeded by: Francis Cherry

Personal details
- Born: Sidney Sanders McMath; June 14, 1912 Magnolia, Arkansas, U.S.
- Died: October 4, 2003 (aged 91) Little Rock, Arkansas, U.S.
- Resting place: Pinecrest Memorial Cemetery, Saline County, Arkansas, U.S.
- Party: Democratic
- Spouses: Elaine Braughton (m. 1937; died 1942); Anne Phillips (m. 1944; died 1994); Betty Russell (m. 1996)
- Profession: Attorney
- Awards: Silver Star; Legion of Merit; See more

Military service
- Allegiance: United States
- Branch/service: Marine Corps
- Years of service: 1936–1939 (reserve); 1940–1945 (active); 1946–1970 (reserve)
- Rank: Major General
- Commands: VTU 8–14 (1953–1964); 3d Marines (1942–1944) (Acting)
- Battles/wars: World War II: Asiatic-Pacific Campaign

Sidney Sanders McMath (June 14, 1912 – October 4, 2003) was a U.S. marine, attorney and the 34th governor of Arkansas from 1949 to 1953. In defiance of his state's political establishment, he championed rapid rural electrification, massive highway and school construction, the building of the University of Arkansas for Medical Sciences, strict bank and utility regulation, repeal of the poll tax, open and honest elections, and broad expansion of opportunity for black citizens in the decade following World War II.

McMath remained loyal to President Harry S. Truman during the "Dixiecrat" rebellion of 1948, campaigning throughout the South for Truman's re-election. As a former governor, McMath led the opposition to segregationist Governor Orval Faubus following the 1957 Little Rock school crisis. He later became one of the nation's foremost trial lawyers, representing thousands of injured persons in precedent-setting cases and mentoring several generations of young attorneys. At the time of his death, he was the earliest-serving former governor.

== Early life ==
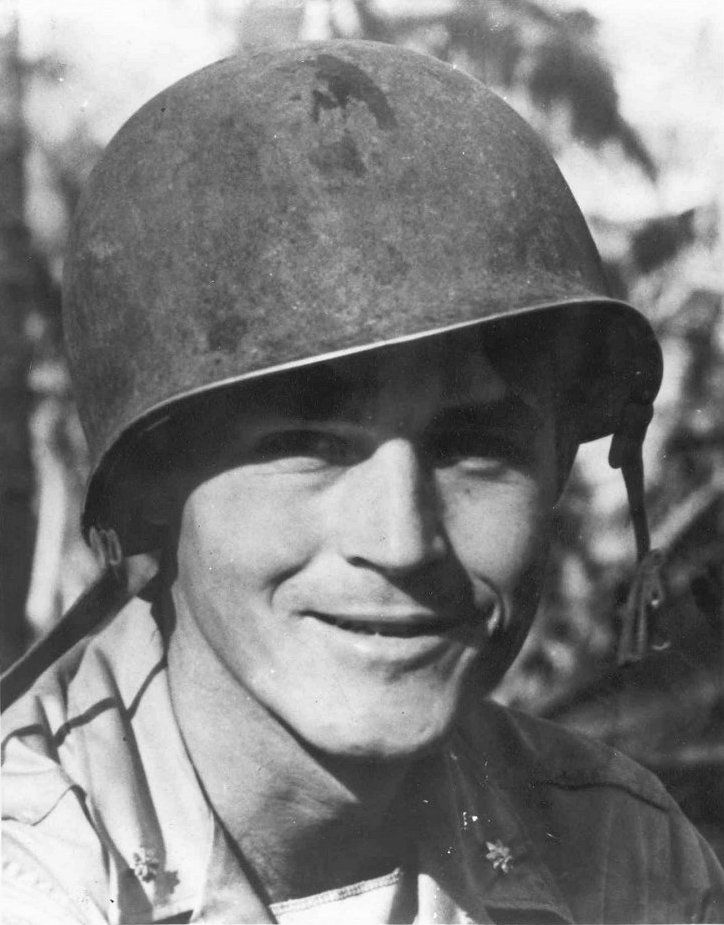
McMath in uniform, c. 1942

Sidney Sanders McMath was born in a dog-trot log cabin on the old McMath home place near Magnolia, Columbia County, Arkansas, the son of Hal Pierce and Nettie Belle Sanders McMath. His paternal grandfather, Columbia County Sheriff Sidney Smith McMath, grand nephew of his martyred Goliad namesake, had himself been killed in the line of duty the previous year, leaving a pensionless widow and eight children, Hal being the eldest. After years of wrangling horses and bad-luck wildcatting in the Southwest Arkansas oil fields, Hal McMath moved his family by wagon to Hot Springs in June 1922. There, he sold the last of his horses and took a job as a barber. Nettie went to work as a manicurist and for the Malco movie theater as a ticket vendor. Sid and his sister, Edyth, attended Hot Springs public schools, where the boy excelled in boxing and drama and became an Eagle Scout while shining shoes and hawking newspapers to supplement the family's meager income. He was elected president of his class each of his high school years, the last of which he won the state Golden Gloves welterweight boxing title. He attended Henderson State College and the University of Arkansas, where he was elected president of the student body. He was a member of the Arkansas Pershing Rifles military fraternal organization, Blue Key, and Sigma Alpha Epsilon. He graduated from the university's School of Law in 1936.

McMath received a reserve ROTC commission as a second lieutenant in the Marines upon graduation from college. During World War II he served with the Marines after voluntarily returning to active duty in 1940. Assigned to train officer candidates at Quantico, Virginia, he was promoted to captain, then to major, and in 1942 he was ordered to American Samoa in command of the combined forces jungle warfare school. From late 1942 to early 1944, he led the 3rd Marine Regiment in battle as operations officer and acting CO in the Pacific Theatre, including New Georgia, Vella Lavella, Guadalcanal and Bougainville, during which he directed the Battle of Piva Forks, the pivotal action, single-handedly rallying troops pinned down by enemy mortar and machine-gun fire. He received a battlefield promotion to lieutenant colonel and was awarded the Silver Star and Legion of Merit. The citation for the former, personally signed by Admiral W.F. "Bull" Halsey, lauded McMath's "extraordinary heroism ... and disregard for his own safety above and beyond the call of duty [which] was an inspiration to the officers and men who observed him." Shortly afterward, McMath was stricken with malaria and filariasis and hospitalized for several months in New Zealand and San Diego. He then served in the Marine Corps headquarters in Washington, D.C. planning an amphibious invasion of the Japanese home islands. Lt. Col. McMath was discharged from active duty in December 1945.

He resumed his activity with the Marine Corps Reserve following his tenure as governor and commanded VTU 8–14 in Little Rock until 1964. He held the office of National President of the 3d Marine Division Association 1960–61.

Following his promotion to brigadier general in June 1963, with date of rank from July 1962, he performed active service as assistant commanding general, Marine Corps Base, Camp Pendleton, California, in the summer of 1963; assistant commanding general, Landing Force Training Unit, Pacific, at Coronado, California, in the summer of 1964; assistant division commander, 2nd Marine Division, FMF, at Camp Lejeune, North Carolina, in the summer of 1965; president, Marine Corps Reserve Policy Board, USMC, in the summer of 1966, and in addition served at Fleet Marine Force, Pacific, including the 3rd Marine Amphibious Force in Vietnam. He was promoted to major general on November 7, 1966. In 1967, the general served as assistant deputy commander, Fleet Marine Force, Atlantic, during the summer training period. He served a second brief Reserve tour in Vietnam, with the 3rd Marine Division, in 1969.

In 1967, he helped found the Marine Corps JROTC at Catholic High School for Boys in Little Rock, Arkansas, which became one of the top JROTC units in the nation.

== Early political career ==
In early 1946, McMath and other veterans returning from World War II banded together to fight corruption in the Hot Springs city government, which was dominated by illegal gambling interests. Hot Springs at the time was a national gambling mecca frequented by organized crime figures from Chicago, New York City, and other metropolitan areas. Casinos flourished, and hotels advertised the availability of prostitutes. Mobsters maintained political control by purchasing and holding hundreds of poll tax receipts, often in the names of deceased or fictitious persons, which would be used to cast multiple votes in different precincts. Law enforcement officers were on the payroll of the local "organization" headed by longstanding Mayor Leo McLaughlin. A former sheriff who attempted to have the state's anti-gambling laws enforced was murdered in 1937; no one was ever charged with the killing. McMath headed a "GI Ticket", which, except for McMath himself, was defeated in the Democratic primary election. However, the others resigned from the party and ran again as independents in the 1946 general election after McMath persuaded a federal judge to toss out the fraudulent poll tax receipts. Most won their offices. Among them were noted combat aviators Earl T. Ricks and I.G. Brown who were elected as mayor and sheriff, respectively.

McMath served as prosecuting attorney for the 18th Judicial District (Garland and Montgomery Counties) starting in 1947. The newly-installed GI officials, led by McMath, shut down the casinos and other rackets and a grand jury indicted many owners, pitchmen, and politicians, including the former mayor. With the development of Las Vegas in the years afterward, Hot Springs lost its premier gaming status. A casino revival during the administration of Governor Orval Faubus (1955–1967) was ended in 1967 by Republican governor Winthrop Rockefeller (1967–1971).

== Governor of Arkansas ==
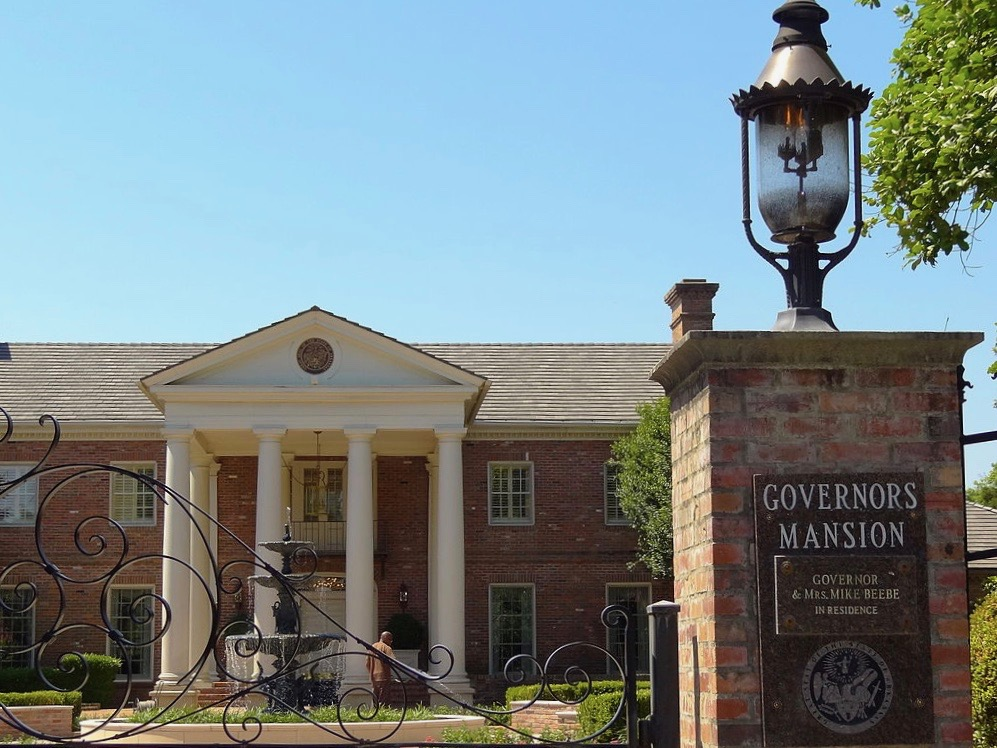
Governor's Mansion at Little Rock. McMath occupied the official residence from February 1950 to January 1953.

After success as a prosecutor, McMath in 1948 won a close Democratic gubernatorial primary runoff election against conservative Jack Holt, a former state attorney general. Holt accused McMath of "selling out to the Negro vote." McMath then defeated the Republican Charles R. Black of Corning, Arkansas in the general election.

McMath entered office January 11, 1949, as the nation's youngest governor. He was easily reelected in 1950 over his immediate predecessor, Benjamin Travis Laney of Camden, who attacked McMath for having supported Truman in 1948 when Laney and many other southern Democrats bolted the Democratic party over its civil rights plank. The walk-outs switched their allegiance to Governor Strom Thurmond of South Carolina, who ran as a "Dixiecrat". McMath wrested control of the Arkansas party from Laney. He campaigned vigorously across the region and was credited by Truman with helping to save most of the South for the Democratic column, providing the electoral margin for a stunning upset victory. The two developed a lifelong friendship; McMath was mentioned early as a possible vice-presidential choice in 1952.

Described as a “Modern Populist,” McMath presided over a number of progressive measures during his tenure. His administration focused on infrastructure improvements, including the extensive paving of farm-to-market and primary roads "to get Arkansas out of the mud and the dust", rural electrification, and the construction of a medical center in the capital city. McMath supported anti-lynching statutes and appointed African-Americans to state boards for the first time. His administration consolidated hundreds of small school districts and built the University of Arkansas for Medical Sciences (financed with a two-cent tax on cigarettes – a significant innovation). McMath worked tirelessly, often clandestinely, with Dr. Lawrence Davis, Sr. to save the state's all-black college, Arkansas Agricultural, Mechanical, & Normal, now the University of Arkansas at Pine Bluff. McMath also reformed the state's mental health system and increased the minimum wage.

McMath was elected by the governors of other petroleum producing states to chair the Interstate Oil and Gas Compact Commission, which sought to improve pricing structures and broaden federal support for fossil fuel exploration. He was elected chairman of the Southern Governor's Conference. McMath invited muckraking Arkansas Gazette editor Harry Ashmore to speak to the governors. His topic was the waste of scarce public funds in maintaining separate school systems for white and black pupils.

== Defeat for third term and U.S. Senate ==
McMath ran afoul of the energy and other extractionist sectors who had long dominated Arkansas politics, but for whom McMath was not a compliant agent. These included Arkansas Power & Light, headed by utility magnate C. Hamilton Moses; wealthy bankers and bond dealers; piney woods timber companies; the Murphy Oil conglomerate and its retainers; and old-family planters in the Mississippi Delta. All feared that McMath's progressive politics would increase labor costs and break up the sharecropping farm economy. The utility feared the loss of territory to rural electric cooperatives. These interests put aside their differences to work in concert to defeat McMath's bid for a third term in the 1952 election. McMath ran unsuccessfully for the U.S. Senate in 1954 and again for governor in 1962, with primarily the same opposition united against him—although, by 1962, Moses had been displaced by bond and gas tycoon W.R. "Witt" Stephens of Stephens Inc. as principal kingmaker. In the 1962 race, McMath came within 500 votes of forcing Governor Orval Faubus, who had once been his executive secretary and highway director, into a runoff. McMath's voting base among the working class was neutralized by the $2 poll tax (roughly $50 in 2014 dollars) which had to be paid a year before an election, effectively disenfranchising thousands of those voters. McMath strove in vain to repeal the tax, which remained a relic of Jim Crow until the 24th Amendment to the U.S. Constitution in 1964.

== Trial law practice ==
Following his 1952 defeat, McMath returned to the practice of law and over the next half-century became one of the leading consumer trial attorneys in the United States. His cases set a broad range of legal precedents, including the first million-dollar personal injury verdict in a U.S. District Court (for an injured Arkansas River barge crewman, in 1968), a woman's right to recover for the loss of her husband's consortium (an element of damage previously limited to men), manufacturers' responsibility for harm caused by defective products and negligent advertising encouraging their misuse, the chemical industry's liability for crop and environmental damage, drug companies' responsibility for fatal vaccine reactions in children, gun dealers' fault for the negligent sale of firearms, and the right of workers to sue third-party suppliers for job injuries. He and his partner Henry Woods, who had served as his gubernatorial chief of staff and later was appointed U.S. District Judge, became nationally known for their effective use of powerful demonstrative evidence, such as detailed models of accident scenes and the human anatomy. In 1976, he was elected president of the International Academy of Trial Lawyers, a select group of 500 of the world's most distinguished barristers, taking office February 22, 1977, at the group's annual convention in Nairobi, Kenya.

McMath's courtroom victories were all the more remarkable for being won in an era of "blue ribbon" juries handpicked by commissioners, themselves selected by state court judges beholden to insurance defense law firms from whom they received thousands of dollars in non-reportable (and non-refundable) campaign contributions for re-election races in which few were ever opposed. Factory workers, blacks, union members, ordinary laborers, and other wage earners were often excluded from panels which were heavily weighted with bank and insurance company employees, mid-level managers, realtors, small business owners, salaried professionals, country club members and others hostile to claimants. Federal court juries were somewhat more diverse, but U.S. district judges, invariably former corporate counsel, had broader powers to dismiss cases summarily, overturn verdicts, and to withhold evidence favorable to the plaintiff—rulings which often occurred, necessitating lengthy appeals before some cases could be fully tried. Many did not survive this gauntlet.

McMath wrote a memoir, Promises Kept (University of Arkansas Press, 2003, ISBN 1-55728-754-6) detailing his rural upbringing, public schooling, family tragedies – including the death of his first wife, Elaine, during the war and the shooting to death of his father, who had become an enraged alcoholic, by his second wife, Anne, in 1947 – as well as his years of military service and as governor. The Arkansas Historical Association awarded the autobiography its 2003 John G. Ragsdale Prize as the year's most outstanding historical work. In April 2006 the book was awarded the Booker T. Worthen Medal for literary excellence by the Arkansas Library System. An appendix discusses McMath's more significant cases from the citizen's point of view. These include Franco v. Bunyard, which held gun merchants liable for negligently selling a pistol to escaped convicts who kidnapped and murdered store clerks; Fitzsimmons v. General Motors, which pioneered the rule of consumer induced misuse through seductive advertising (the first of three "Smokey and the Bandit" Trans Am cases handled by the firm in which it was shown that clips and outtakes from scofflaw motion pictures were spliced by GM into TV commercials aimed at adolescent males); Miller v. Missouri Pacific Ry. Co., which established a woman's right to sue for the loss of her husband's society, companionship and sexual relations; Brinegar v. San Ore Construction Co., a landmark admiralty case; Harrod v. E.I. Du Pont de Nemours & Co., and Work v. Tyson Foods, Inc. and many other actions resulting in multimillion-dollar recoveries for farmers and homeowners whose crops and groundwater were poisoned by defective pesticides and poultry effluent. The Harrod case involved the issue of whether tomato crops had been damaged by cold weather or by du Pont's fungicide, Benlate, which plaintiffs contended was contaminated with the weed killer, Atrazine. Bruce McMath, lead counsel at trial, successfully confronted rumors that his clients' claims were dishonest by openly asking jurors on voir dire, "How many of you have ever cheated on your taxes?" The synopsis of the case in "Promises Kept" is written from the perspective of plaintiffs' attorneys and stresses their contention that du Pont had intentionally contaminated their product, a claim vehemently denied by the defense.

Members of McMath's firm founded in 1983 the Nursing Home Malpractice Litigation Group of the American Trial Lawyers Association. The group provides logistical and research support for local attorneys in custodial abuse cases.

In 1991, McMath and his firm proposed suit against tobacco companies to recover Medicaid funds spent caring for smokers. Rejected by Arkansas authorities, who had close ties to tobacco lobbyists and law firms, the idea was used by Florida, Mississippi, and Minnesota, which won billion dollar-settlements. Forty-six other states soon brought their own claims. Texas recovered $18 billion in a Texarkana federal court claim which Arkansas officials refused to join. Arkansas finally concluded a $60 million per year tag-along settlement in 1999. These, and the federal government's own recoveries which followed in their wake will eventually exceed $1 trillion, representing the largest public interest litigation result in American legal history.

== Later life ==
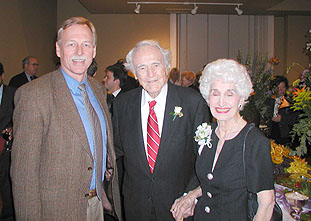
McMath with his third wife, Betty Dortch Russell McMath, and former U.S. Rep. Vic Snyder.

Sid McMath remained active into his 90s, continuing to speak at Arkansas schools and events, particularly at his first alma mater, Henderson State University, whose faculty established a history and political science lecture series in his honor, and at the University of Arkansas for Medical Sciences, to whose scholarship fund he was a substantial contributor. He also supported local civic organizations, including the Union Rescue Mission, the Scottish Rite Masons (who awarded him its highest honor of the Grand Cross), and the Lions World Services for the Blind, whose training school in Little Rock he completed in 1999 following the loss of his vision due to macular degeneration. A video commercial featuring McMath has been aired nationally by the school in recent years. McMath was elected president of the Third Marine Division Association and in 1994 he narrated The Battle of Bauxite, a television documentary recounting the story of the miners who excavated thousands of tons of aluminum ore from pits near Bauxite, Arkansas, which was used for military aircraft production during World War II. Aluminum workers and their families were among his most ardent supporters during his many campaigns. McMath taught a senior Bible study class for 26 years at Little Rock's Pulaski Heights United Methodist Church, with emphasis on the Old Testament prophets.

== Death ==
McMath died at his home in Little Rock on October 4, 2003. He had been released from a hospital stay three days earlier after being treated for severe dehydration, malnourishment, and an irregular heartbeat. He was survived by his third wife, Betty Dorch Russell McMath, three sons: Sandy, Phillip, and Bruce McMath; two daughters, Melissa Hatfield and Patricia Bueter; ten grandchildren and one great-grandchild. His first wife and childhood sweetheart, Elaine Braughton McMath, died at Quantico, Virginia in 1942. His second wife, of 49 years, Anne Phillips McMath, died at Little Rock in 1994. Following the death of Strom Thurmond, he became the earliest-serving former governor. After his death, the title was passed on to Delaware governor Elbert N. Carvel, who was inaugurated one week after McMath.

McMath was given a full military funeral by a U.S. Marine Corps Honor Guard. He lay in state for a day in the state Capitol rotunda, following which his closed, flag-draped coffin was transported by motorcade to Pulaski Heights United Methodist Church in Little Rock for services attended by more than 2,000 persons. He was eulogized by former governor David Pryor as, "the best friend Arkansas ever had." The ceremony included hymns by the combined Methodist and the University of Arkansas at Pine Bluff Vespers choirs, concluding with "Onward, Christian Soldiers." Following the firing of a salute by the Honor Guard, McMath was interred at Pinecrest Memorial Cemetery in Saline County, Arkansas, a few yards from a survey marker denoting the geographical center of the state.

Sid McMath Avenue in Little Rock is named for him, and in December 2004 the Central Arkansas Library System dedicated a new branch in his honor. A statue of McMath, waving his trademark Panama campaign hat, was commissioned by the library from sculptor Bryan Massey. It was unveiled September 26, 2006, as the centerpiece of a sculpture plaza and nature trail. In December 2006, Electric Cooperatives of Arkansas announced the presentation of the first Sidney S. McMath Award for Outstanding Leadership and Courage by a Public Official to U.S. representative Marion Berry (D-Ark). Former congressmen Mike Ross (D-Ark) and John Paul Hammerschmidt (R-Ark) have also received the award. Henderson State University has established the Sidney S. McMath Pre-Law Lecture Series Fellowship and the University of Arkansas for Medical Sciences recently received a $1 million private endowment for the Sidney S. McMath professorship in public health. On September 19, 2012, UAMS dedicated a life-sized painting of McMath above a plaque paying tribute to him as "Founder of the College of Nursing", "Founder of the College of Pharmacy" and "Founder of the University of Arkansas Medical Center." The Governor Sidney Sanders McMath Memorial Scholarship for an Outstanding Pre-Law Junior was established at Southern Arkansas University by the Columbia County Democratic Central Committee on April 5, 2008. Lions World Services for the Blind presents an annual Sidney McMath Award for a Lifetime of Outstanding Public Service. The Arkansas Prosecuting Attorneys Association, in conjunction with Henderson State University, presents an annual Sid McMath Sword of Justice award to the district attorney who best exemplifies courage and tenacity in that office. The former governor's autobiography, Promises Kept, posthumously was awarded the Arkansas Historical Association's highest accolade, the John G. Ragsdale Prize. In April 2006 it received the Booker T. Worthen Medal for literary excellence from the Central Arkansas Library System. The week of June 14, 2012, McMath's 100th birthday, was celebrated with a "Centennial Salute" by the library whose Butler Center, with Henderson State University, presented public lectures by 24 historians, educators and community leaders on various aspects of McMath's political, legal and military careers. The symposium was chaired by Dr. Michael Pierce, associate professor of southern history at the University of Arkansas and editor of the Arkansas Historical Quarterly, and Dr. C. Fred Williams, chair emeritus of the University of Arkansas at Little Rock Department of History. Presentations were videotaped and archived by the David and Barbara Pryor Center for Oral History. Little Rock's Main Post Office was renamed in McMath's honor on June 7, 2013, by Special Act of Congress signed by President Obama.

== Legacy ==
=== Historical reputation ===
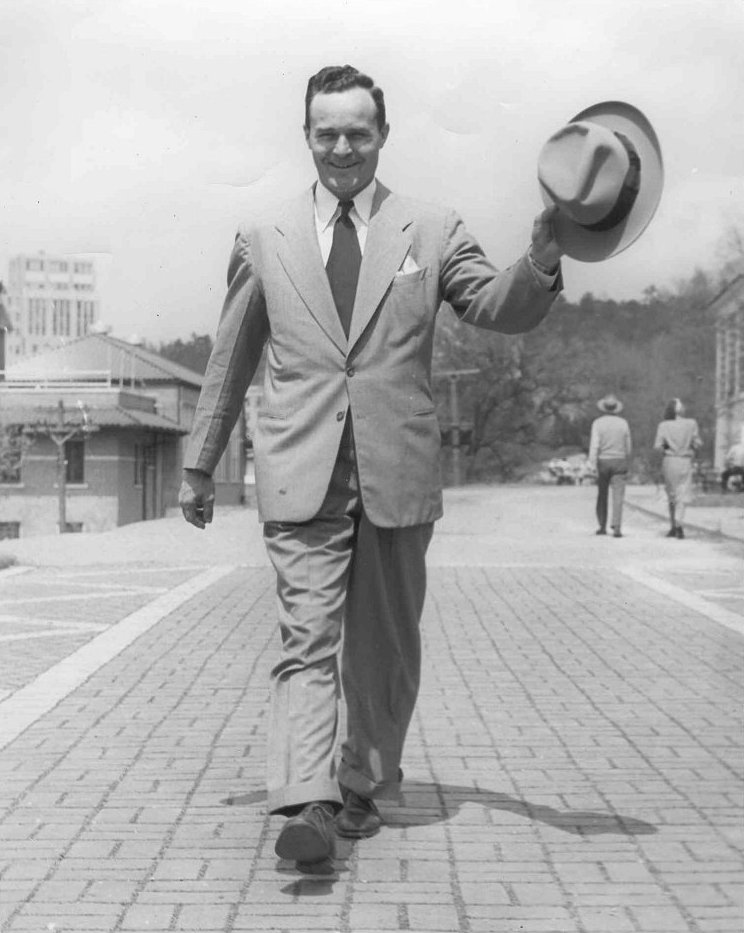
Sid McMath, August 1948, on the bath house promenade, Hot Springs National Park

In a 1999 opinion poll of political science professors, McMath placed fourth on a list of top Arkansas governors of the 20th century. However, in a December 2003 forum of historians and journalists sponsored by the Old State House Museum in Little Rock, there was a consensus that McMath's historic highway and school building programs, his early commitment to civil rights, particularly his support of U.S. President Harry S Truman in the 1948 presidential election against Dixiecrat Strom Thurmond, the abolition of the so-called "white primary" in Arkansas (1949), the opening of the state's medical and law schools to African-Americans (Fall 1948, but only after Governor-elect McMath's express approval), his championship of rural electrification and his relentless opposition to segregationist Governor Orval Faubus, a former McMath ally (Faubus had served as McMath's director of highways), during the 1957 Little Rock Central High School desegregation turmoil and throughout Faubus's subsequent nine years in office, could well result in his elevation by future historians to first place – not only among Arkansas governors, but among all southern governors of the time.

During the Little Rock Integration Crisis, McMath called upon U.S. president Dwight D. Eisenhower to take over the Arkansas National Guard if Faubus misused it to obstruct the implementation of federal court orders.

"Sid McMath might have laid legitimate claim to have been the most courageous and far-sighted Southern leader of the 20th century", wrote Arkansas Times columnist Ernest Dumas on October 10, 2003. "What separated McMath from every other leader of that grim time in the South was courage, the moral as well as physical variety."

Concluded Dumas: "[T]he real test of courage was how he handled the defining issue of the century for every Southern political leader. [I]n a field crowded by frenzied men trying to outdo each other in their zeal to keep the Negro in his place, McMath deplored race-baiting. ... Had one – just one! – major elected Southern official broken ranks on civil rights, early on, before the racist opposition began to metastasize, history might have been so different. The tragedy of Faubus and Fulbright was that they lacked the courage to do so. The tragedy of Sid McMath was that corporate vengeance denied him the opportunity to do what they would not."

George Arnold, Northwest Arkansas opinion editor of the Arkansas Democrat-Gazette, observed in a March 2004 column that, "If [McMath] had been able to take Arkansas further down the path to modernization and racial harmony, Arkansas history would have been quite different. Arkansas paid a big price when the public utilities muscled him out of office. [It is] still paying." See Further Reading, below, for continued utility pricing disparity in Arkansas compared to neighboring states.

Harry Ashmore, whose Arkansas Gazette editorials during the Little Rock school crisis won dual Pulitzer Prizes for him and the paper, wrote in an April 1977 book review that, "McMath's ... return to active politics in the Faubus era was pro bono, an act of integrity undertaken when he knew the chances of winning were slight and the personal cost would be high. [O]ne who did not always see eye to eye with him could say of Sid McMath: 'He was there when the people needed him and didn't know it. He is a far better man than any of those who came out ahead of him at the polls.'"

The Arkansas Democrat-Gazette, in an October 7, 2003 editorial ("Greatness Passed This Way") written by editorial page editor Paul Greenberg, himself a recipient of the Pulitzer Prize, lauded McMath as, "[T]he greatest [man] of his era – and of a few others."

"Sid McMath", the newspaper said, "never believed in testing the political winds before speak[ing] out for principle. He remained a true, old-fashioned Harry Truman Democrat even as that breed gradually disappeared. When others in the party argued that America could safely co-exist with evil, Sid McMath knew better – and said so. He also knew there are far worse things than losing elections – like winning them for the wrong reasons ... He would not accept the expansion of evil in the world, no matter how inevitable that was said to be by distinguished statesmen at the time. Instead he would defy it – and urge others to join him."

The belatedness of McMath's recognition as one of the South's great political leaders has undoubtedly been due to lingering detraction from an ersatz "highway scandal" (see below) contrived by opponents to defeat his 1952 re-election bid as well as his steadfast support of a tough anti-communist foreign policy throughout the Cold War, including the Vietnam War (in which he served two short reserve tours), which McMath, while condemning its micromanagement by the Johnson and Nixon administrations, saw as a critical holding action necessary to give the emerging nations of the Asian rim, most of whom were fending off their own communist insurgencies, time to build market economies and some form of democracy. In Promises Kept he suggests that this goal was in fact achieved, in spite of the 1975 North Vietnamese victory over the south, which McMath saw as pyrrhic in light of the subsequent collapse of the Soviet empire and the emergence of the rest of Southeast Asia as a free-trading powerhouse.

Nevertheless, these views, presented in scores of speeches to school, civic and veterans' groups, were bitterly resented by many of McMath's erstwhile supporters, particularly academics, editorial writers and liberal activists (including some members of his own law firm, who left on this account), for whom an aggressive Cold War stance became heresy during the late 1960s onward – indeed, until the fall of the Berlin Wall in 1989. In spite of his towering credentials as a social and economic progressive, many of these persons never forgave McMath for his anti-communist, national defense positions, mentioning him, if at all, in detraction or with condescension and omitting him altogether from lists of historical notables. The former governor's stances on these questions (and the anathema with which he came to be held by liberal elites) contrasted sharply with those of popular Arkansas Senator William Fulbright, who, as chairman of the U.S. Senate Committee on Foreign Relations vigorously opposed a hardline policy toward the Soviet Union generally and the U.S. commitment to South Vietnam in particular.

McMath's grit (some would say stubbornness) in the face of sustained unpopularity and virtually certain defeat at the polls, when compromise with his opponents might have assured his survival "to fight another day", has caused some commentators to question his commitment to a political career rather than to a valiant but naive Arthurian chivalry – or perhaps a fatalistic resignation. However, one participant at a Southern Arkansas University forum on McMath held November 3, 2003 in Magnolia, Arkansas put it another way: "When Sid McMath stood for civil rights in the 1940s and 1950s he stood virtually alone among the South's political leaders, most of whom were waving the bloody shirt. By the 1970s every Southern pol was supporting full citizenship for African-Americans. It was by then politically correct. But for McMath, it took unprecedented courage. And in fact it later cost him whatever chance he had to salvage his political career. He certainly deserves a chapter in the next Profiles in Courage. He was a true hero, not only to the South, but also to the Nation. He ranks with John Peter Altgeld [of Illinois], James Stephen Hogg [of Texas] and Robert M. La Follette [of Wisconsin] as the greatest of the American state governors. His stands on principle undoubtedly denied him a genuine chance to contend for the presidency. His life can be summed up in one word: Valor."

=== Political legacy ===
Sid McMath served six years in public office, only four as governor. Gambling in Hot Springs returned sporadically for another 20 years. Every Arkansas home eventually would have been wired for electricity – although up to a decade later and under AP&L monopoly pricing rather than Co-op rates. The Interstate highway system was mostly completed through Arkansas by 1980 – tying into the thousands of miles of farm-to-market roads built or begun by McMath. National repeal of the poll tax was achieved by Constitutional Amendment, the adoption of which was enhanced by the support of a few Southern moderates, including McMath. The Civil Rights acts of the 1960s and changing cultural attitudes ultimately improved, but did not end, discrimination against African-Americans.

He accumulated no great wealth, owning at the end a modestly upscale condominium and a small residual interest in his law firm. The latter, though no longer occupying the field alone, remains the state's premier personal injury practice.

A key to McMath's ultimate legacy may be found in the memory of those who knew him, if only for a time. "You always left Sid McMath with the feeling, not that you had been with someone important, but that you were important, that your life had been uplifted", Arkansas Circuit Judge John Norman Harkey has said of McMath. "Sid took your cares away. He refreshed your spirit. No matter how down you were before, he made you want to charge back into the battle, but with a smile, knowing, by gosh, we can really win this thing. And we did win." But, of course, McMath did not always win. A stock remark he would offer following a loss was, "The bastards know they've been in a fight. You have to let them know you're not afraid to leave your blood on the courtroom floor. I've left a lot of blood on the courtroom floor."

Once a noted collegiate thespian, McMath on occasion would recite lines dealing with honor from roles in which he had acted (or aspired to act) in his youth such as the lead in Rostand's Cyrano de Bergerac.

=== Political image ===
McMath's standing has been enhanced by contemporary re-examinations of his administration's extraordinary accomplishments, given the poverty and parsimony of the era. These included the use of an unprecedented bond issue to secure the paving of more hard surface roads than all previous administrations combined (and more than those paved by any other Southern state during the period), taxing cigarettes to build the state's medical college, a policy of openness and inclusion toward African-Americans generally and a concerted public school improvement program, including a reduction of the number of school districts from 1,753 to 425 – a measure begun by others but heartily endorsed by McMath in the 1948 general election and rigorously enforced by his administration after passage under the leadership of Dr. A.B. Bonds Jr., one of the country's top young educators, a former training director for the Atomic Energy Commission, and a native Arkansan whom McMath persuaded to return to the state as director of the Department of Education.

Most important was McMath's politically fatal but ultimately successful war against Middle South Utilities (now Entergy Corporation), the then-dominant political force in state politics, which operated locally as Arkansas Power & Light (a subsidiary of Entergy) Co. (AP&L). The corporation and its affiliates opposed the extension of Rural Electrification Administration (REA)-generated electrical power to rural areas, which its directors and chief shareholders saw as a captive territory for AP&L's own eventual expansion. Fewer than half of Arkansas farm homes had electricity in 1948. REA-affiliated cooperatives, however, guided by Harry L. Oswald, for 32 years their Arkansas general manager and a fervent McMath loyalist, were able to open service to those areas by 1956 as the result of co-op-enabling legislation, including authorization for the building of steam generating plants, which was enacted by Congress in large part at McMath's behest.

Middle South led the combination that defeated McMath in his 1952 re-election bid and in his 1954 effort to unseat then-Senator John L. McClellan. McClellan, who maintained a lucrative law practice with Middle South's chairman C. Hamilton Moses, referred to the REA co-ops as "communistic" during the campaign, which was conducted at the height of the "red scare" heightened by U.S. senator Joseph McCarthy's claims of communist influence in the Truman administration. McClellan was the ranking member of the Army-McCarthy subcommittee, whose hearings were televised live during the lead-up to the election. Liberal senators Hubert Humphrey, Stuart Symington, and others, as well as Senate Majority Leader Lyndon Johnson, signed newspaper ads supporting McClellan. Moses had similarly partnered with McClellan's predecessor, Joe T. Robinson, who prior to his death in 1937 had used his considerable power as Senate majority leader to divert the New Deal's showcase Tennessee Valley Authority (TVA) public electricity generating project away from the Arkansas River, the basin for which it was originally proposed. Moses, who had supported McMath in 1948 but had since cooled toward him, brought AP&L's entire board of directors to the governor's office just before the 1952 candidate filing deadline to lobby McMath against the building of the initial steam generating plant, at Ozark, Arkansas. They promised to aid McMath's third-term re-election bid, in spite of past differences, if he would withdraw his support for the plant. The governor heard the businessmen out but reaffirmed his commitment to Co-op power. Shortly afterward, four heavily AP&L-funded gubernatorial candidates filed against McMath, one of whom, Chancery Judge Francis Cherry of Jonesboro, defeated him in the August primary run-off during which Cherry hosted a round-the-clock radio "talkathon" lambasting "the McMath Highway Scandal". (See below.) Cherry was elected in November but served only one term, being defeated by Faubus in the 1954 run-off.

McClellan narrowly defeated McMath in the 1954 senatorial race, an election now generally recognized to have been marked by widespread fraud. For example, record numbers of black voters, for whom McMath had only five years before secured the right to vote in Democratic primaries, were trucked to the polls (usually plantation stores or gin offices) in Eastern Arkansas by McClellan supporters among the planters of that region who held their workers' poll tax receipts and recorded how they voted. McMath lost some of those precincts by better than 9 to 1 margins as election officials in Lee, Crittenden, Phillips, Mississippi, Desha and Chicot counties delayed completion of vote counts for a full day after the election—allegedly to see how many more fraudulent votes McClellan needed to win without a run-off.

AP&L's (and McClellan's) enmity toward McMath did not end with his defeat in the senatorial election. Nine years later, when President John F. Kennedy suggested McMath's possible appointment as a replacement Secretary of the Interior, McClellan quickly used his special relationship with Attorney General Robert F. Kennedy, a former counsel to the Permanent Subcommittee on Investigations of the U.S. Senate Committee on Government Operations, of which McClellan had become chairman in 1955, to nip the idea in the bud. A similar suggestion in 1964 by then-President Lyndon Johnson met the same fate. Some of McMath's most stalwart support was from organized labor, whose abuses, particularly by national leaders of the Teamsters, were a focus of the committee's investigations in the late 1950s. No Arkansas union members or officials, however, figured prominently in these probes.

Allegations of corruption in McMath's highway department, brought by a grand jury dominated by utility minions, were eventually proven unfounded in three separate proceedings. Two grand juries returned no indictments, but a third on which several Middle South managers served returned three, each alleging shakedowns of highway contractors for campaign contributions. All of the accused were acquitted. There was no allegation of personal wrongdoing by McMath. However, the assertions against his administration dogged him for the rest of his life and Promises Kept includes a chapter in which McMath refutes the charges and chastises his opponents for abusing the judicial system to fabricate them. The former governor's October 22, 1954 sworn statement before the U.S. Senate committee investigating monopoly influence over the distribution of the nation's electrical power, in which he recounts Middle South-AP&L's manipulation of the Arkansas "Highway Audit Commission" and the grand jury process, warrants inclusion in any anthology of significant state papers of the 20th century. The truthfulness of McMath's testimony describing in detail this use of raw corporate power to defeat reform and destroy the reformer was never disputed, and no rebuttal was offered. See Further Reading, below.

McMath opposed the "Southern Manifesto", a March 1956 pronouncement of 19 U.S. senators, including Fulbright and McClellan, and 81 congressmen from former Confederate states decrying the Supreme Court's 1954 desegregation ruling in Brown v. Board of Education as: "[C]ontrary to the Constitution ... creating chaos and confusion ... destroying the amicable relations between the white and Negro races ... plant[ing] hatred and suspicion [and an] explosive and dangerous condition [which is being] inflamed by outside meddlers" The document encouraged public officials to use "all lawful means" to thwart the enforcement of the ruling. According to McMath at the time, "This [manifesto] only serves to encourage demagogues to set fires of racial hatred that could consume our people."

It was this Congressional manifesto, McMath laments in Promises Kept, that gave Faubus the impetus and political cover to call out the National Guard in September 1957 to bar the entry of nine black students to Little Rock Central High School. "Emboldened by this support", McMath wrote, "Faubus played his racial card." McMath strenuously opposed this action as well as Faubus' closure of the public schools the following year rather than obey federal court desegregation orders.

McMath counseled President Dwight D. Eisenhower against the use of regular U.S. Army troops, suggesting instead that the U.S. Marshals Service be used to enforce the court's orders. However, this advice was not accepted, and paratroopers from the elite 101st Airborne Division were sent to Little Rock after Eisenhower nationalized the Guard and disbanded it. The soldiers forced the admission of "The Little Rock Nine", as the black students became known, but the troops' presence, as McMath foretold, stirred states-rights sentiment to a frenzy, made Faubus a hero to a majority of Arkansas voters, and ensured his re-election to a record six terms in office – each time, ironically, with an increasing percentage of the African-American vote, of which he garnered more than 80% in the 1964 Democratic primary.

McMath became the acknowledged leader of the Faubus opposition and supported insurgent gubernatorial candidates in the 1958 and 1960 Democratic primaries. His law firm was often referred to as resembling "a South American government in exile." McMath, himself, finally ran against Faubus in 1962 under the slogan, "Let's get Arkansas Moving Again." He placed second in a field of five, splitting the black vote with Faubus, while running on a platform of fresh business investment (many firms had fled the state during the years of racial strife or avoided it altogether), stricter regulation of gas and electric utility pricing, and the charging of interest on state revenues, which were held in private banks interest free but which the banks then loaned out at standard commercial rates – a windfall bankers justified as a "fee" for keeping the state's funds. Faubus narrowly avoided a runoff when Marvin Melton, a Jonesboro banker widely seen as the second strongest challenger after McMath, was persuaded by Faubus operatives (who suggested that state funds could be withdrawn from his bank and questions raised about his selling of allegedly inflated insurance company stock) to quit the race.

The 1962 election increased the political influence of businessman Witt Stephens, who was widely regarded as a key financial supporter of Governor Orval Faubus. During the Faubus administration, financial institutions associated with Stephens held substantial state deposits, and Stephens-related businesses maintained significant commercial relationships with the state. His company, Arkansas Louisiana Gas Company, was one of the state's largest utility providers, while Stephens Inc. participated in numerous state bond offerings during Faubus's tenure.

Over time, Stephens Inc. became one of the largest securities firms headquartered outside New York City, and the Stephens family expanded its interests into a variety of industries, including finance and media. Observers have noted that these business holdings contributed to the family's influence in Arkansas politics and public affairs. Media ownership in the state was concentrated among a small number of companies, including organizations associated with both the Stephens family and the Palmer-Hussman group, which owned major newspapers and other communications outlets.

Many of McMath's staunchest supporters turned out in 1966 for Winthrop Rockefeller in his successful bid to become the state's first GOP governor since Reconstruction. Rockefeller soundly defeated the Democratic nominee, an avowed segregationist supreme court justice, Jim Johnson.

The 1966 election was the first full general election cycle since the repeal of the poll tax and passage of the Voting Rights Act. These developments accelerated an already growing shift in influence over black voters from white bosses toward African-American clergy, due in part to the gradual displacement of plantation labor by mechanized agriculture, swelling the unemployment and welfare rolls. Rockefeller's campaign took full advantage of this dynamic by wooing hundreds of black ministers with church improvement contributions and cash get-out-the-vote payments, setting a precedent for future candidates of both parties and considerably raising the cost of electioneering. Some ministers, themselves locally elected officials, hire out as "consultants" to congressional and gubernatorial candidates, often renting their church buildings and vehicles to a campaign and hiring congregants as canvassers and drivers. Early-voting laws now permit even Sunday balloting, facilitating the busing of entire congregations to polling places after services. In some instances, the churches themselves are designated as early voting precincts. Funding this cornucopia of "walking around money", which can exceed $1 million per election cycle for each major statewide candidate, has substantially increased the power of the state's corporate vested interests, whose large bundled and PAC contributions, many from lawyers, managers, and agents of out-of-state parents and affiliates, as well as from international labor union political action funds, are critical in meeting such demanding overhead. Bundling has become even more critical given individual donation limits imposed following Watergate and subsequent scandals. When rising front-end charges for television advertising (essential for reaching white voters but to which African-American voters are largely unresponsive) are added, Arkansas campaign expenditures, per voter, are among the nation's highest.

The Rockefeller administration resumed and expanded the post-war reforms begun by McMath, particularly with regard to civil rights, which, borne on a national tide of rejection of bigotry as public policy, resulted not merely in blacks ceasing to be excluded from public services but able, in significant part, to control their allocation through the franchise – usually by bloc voting for Democratic candidates, but always as a credible threat against any racist isolate. Rather than altering the status quo with some 18% to 22% of the vote statewide (40% to 60% in some counties), blacks have been absorbed into it through disproportionate hiring as lower level public employees and as low wage "associates" of mega-retailing enterprises, poultry processing emporia, tertiary health and casualty insurers, the utility monopolies and other concerns buoyed by the state's parochial, right-to-work economy.

Bereft of Rockefeller's eleemosynary capacity or McMath's disdain for barony, later administrations have reconciled themselves to the exigencies of realpolitik, with a focus on populism and largesse which Sid McMath momentarily challenged half-a-century ago. This has remained the case in the 21st century.

== Military awards ==
McMath was the recipient of the following awards:

Silver Star	Legion of Merit w/ valor device	Navy Unit Commendation
American Defense Service Medal	American Campaign Medal	Asiatic-Pacific Campaign Medal w/ 3 service stars
World War II Victory Medal	Marine Corps Reserve Ribbon	Armed Forces Reserve Medal

== In film ==
In 2018, the Northwest Arkansas Democrat Gazette reported that many still photographs from the film Wonder Valley, made in 1951, in which McMath played himself as governor, had been found. The last known copy of the film was found to be too badly decomposed to be viewable some years before.

== See also ==
- List of governors of Arkansas
- List of members of the American Legion

== Notes ==
Party political offices
Preceded by Benjamin Travis Laney	Democratic nominee for Governor of Arkansas; 1948, 1950	Succeeded by Francis Cherry
Political offices
Preceded by Benjamin Travis Laney	Governor of Arkansas; 1949–1953	Succeeded by Francis Cherry
