= 1948 Arkansas gubernatorial election =

- November 2, 1948
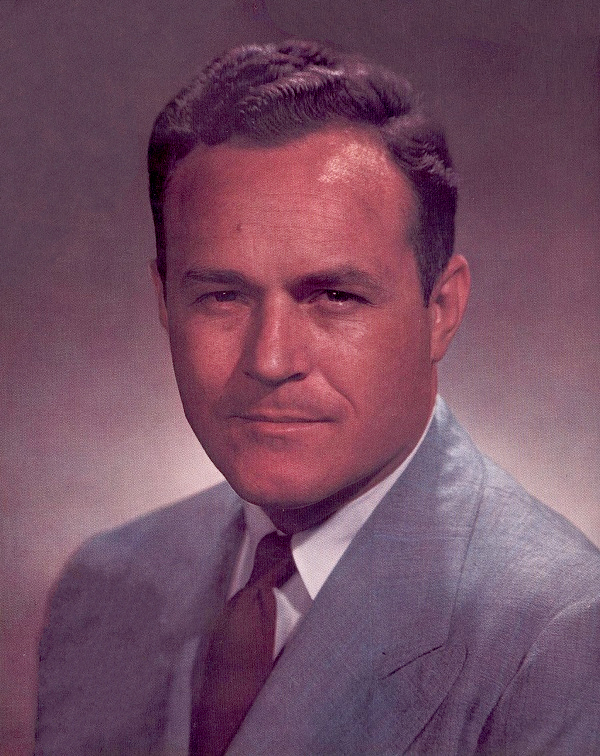

Nominee	Sid McMath	Charles R. Black
Party	Democratic	Republican
Popular vote	222,801	26,500
Percentage	89.37%	10.63%
- County results McMath: 50–60% 60–70% 70–80% 80–90% >90%
Governor before election
Benjamin Travis Laney
Democratic
Elected Governor
Sid McMath
Democratic

The 1948 Arkansas gubernatorial election was held on November 2, 1948.

Incumbent Democratic Governor Benjamin Travis Laney did not seek a third term.

Democratic nominee Sid McMath defeated Republican nominee Charles R. Black with 89.37% of the vote.

== Democratic primary ==
The Democratic primary election was held on July 27, 1948, with the runoff held on August 10, 1948.

=== Candidates ===
- C. A. Fleming
- Jack Wilson Holt Sr., former Arkansas Attorney General
- William Jennings
- John Lonsdale, Jr., former mayor of Lonsdale
- James "Uncle Mac" MacKrell, radio presenter
- Sid McMath, prosecuting attorney for the Eighth Judicial District
- Horace Thompson, former Internal Revenue collector

==== Withdrew ====
- Bob Ed Loftin (endorsed McMath)
- Jim Merritt, attorney (endorsed Holt)

=== Results ===
Results map of the Democratic primary by county. McMath: 50–60% 60–70% 70–80% Holt: 50–60% 60–70% 70–80%

Democratic primary results
Party	Candidate	Votes	%
Democratic	Sid McMath	87,829	34.07
Democratic	Jack Holt	60,313	23.40
Democratic	James MacKrell	57,030	22.12
Democratic	Horace Thompson	48,674	18.88
Democratic	C. A. Fleming	1,661	0.64
Democratic	John Lonsdale, Jr.	1,267	0.49
Democratic	William Jennings	668	0.27
Democratic	Jim Merritt	218	0.09
Democratic	Bob Ed Loftin	96	0.04
Total votes		257,776	100.00

Democratic primary runoff results
Party	Candidate	Votes	%
Democratic	Sid McMath	157,137	51.69
Democratic	Jack Holt	146,880	48.31
Total votes		304,017	100.00

== General election ==
=== Candidates ===
- Sid McMath, Democratic
- Charles R. Black, Republican, lumber manufacturer

=== Results ===
1948 Arkansas gubernatorial election
Party	Candidate	Votes	%	±%
Democratic	Sid McMath	222,801 (Note: Some sources state McMath's total was 217,771.)	89.37%	+5.23%
Republican	Charles R. Black	26,500	10.63%	−5.23%
Majority		196,301	78.74%	
Turnout		249,301	100.00%	
Democratic hold		Swing		

== Bibliography ==
- Gubernatorial Elections, 1787-1997. Washington, D.C.: Congressional Quarterly Inc. 1998. ISBN 1-56802-396-0.
- Glashan, Roy R. (1979). American Governors and Gubernatorial Elections, 1775-1978. Meckler Books. ISBN 0-930466-17-9.
