= Francis Cherry (governor) =

American judge and politician (1908–1965)

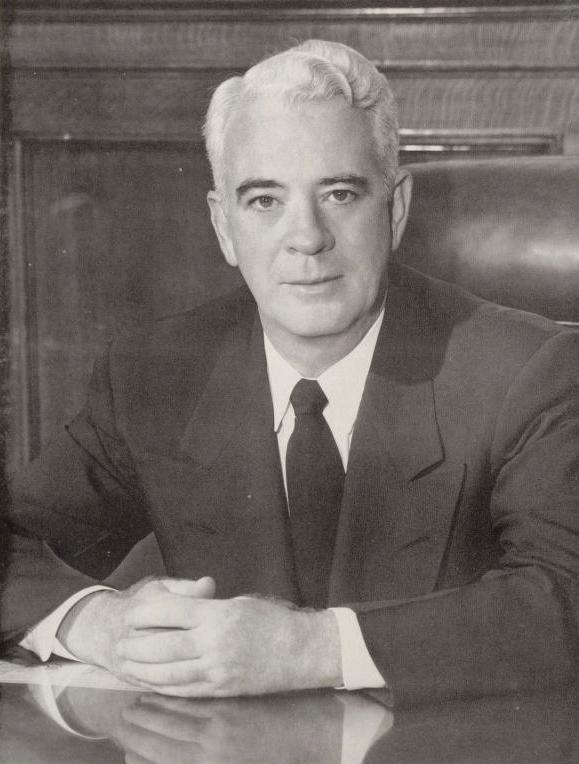
- Cherry in 1954

Probate Judge of the Twelfth Chancery District Court of Arkansas
- In office 1942–1942
- In office 1944–1952

35th Governor of Arkansas
- In office January 13, 1953 – January 11, 1955
- Lieutenant: Nathan Green Gordon
- Preceded by: Sid McMath
- Succeeded by: Orval Faubus

Personal details
- Born: Francis Adams Cherry; September 5, 1908 Fort Worth, Texas, U.S.
- Died: July 15, 1965 (aged 56) Washington, D.C., U.S.
- Party: Democratic
- Spouse: Margaret Frierson (m. 1937)
- Children: 3
- Education: Oklahoma State University; University of Arkansas School of Law
- Occupation: Judge

Francis Adams Cherry (September 5, 1908 – July 15, 1965) was an American judge and politician. A member of the Democratic Party, he served as probate judge of the Twelfth Chancery District Court of Arkansas in 1942 and again from 1944 to 1952 and as governor of Arkansas from 1953 to 1955.

== Life and career ==
Cherry was born in Fort Worth, Texas, the son of Haskill Cherry, a railroad conductor, and Clara Belle. He attended and graduated from high school in Enid, Oklahoma. After graduating, he attended Oklahoma State University, graduating in 1930. He also attended the University of Arkansas School of Law, earning his law degree in 1936.

Cherry briefly served as probate judge of the Twelfth Chancery District Court of Arkansas in 1942, before he served in the United States Navy during World War II, and was promoted to the rank of lieutenant, which after his discharge, he served again as probate judge of the chancery district court from 1944 to 1952. After his service as probate judge, he served as governor of Arkansas from 1953 to 1955. Encyclopedia of Arkansas described Cherry as "underqualified for governor", which after his service as governor, he moved to Washington, D.C. and served on the Subversive Activities Control Board during the presidencies of Dwight D. Eisenhower, John F. Kennedy, and Lyndon B. Johnson.

== Personal life and death ==
In 1937, Cherry married Margaret Frierson. They had three children. Their marriage lasted until Cherry's death in 1965.

Cherry died on July 15, 1965, at his home in Washington, D.C., at the age of 56. He was buried at Oaklawn Cemetery in Jonesboro, Arkansas.
