= List of Baptist colleges and universities in the United States =

This is a list of colleges and universities operated or sponsored by Baptist organizations. Many of these organizations are members of the International Association of Baptist Colleges and Universities (IABCU), which has 47 member schools in 16 states, including 44 colleges and universities, 2 Bible schools, and 1 theological seminary.

== Currently affiliated ==
Institutions associated with or operated by Baptist organizations include:

Institution	Location	Affiliation	Reference
American Baptist College	Nashville, Tennessee	National Baptist Convention	
Anderson University	Anderson, South Carolina	South Carolina Baptist Convention	
Arlington Baptist University	Arlington, Texas	Independent Baptist	
Baptist University of Florida	Graceville, Florida	Florida Baptist Convention	
Baptist University of the Américas	San Antonio, Texas	Baptist General Convention of Texas	
Baylor University	Waco, Texas	Baptist General Convention of Texas	
Benedict College	Columbia, South Carolina	American Baptist Churches USA	
Bethel University (Minnesota)	Arden Hills, Minnesota	Converge	
Blue Mountain Christian University	Blue Mountain, Mississippi	Mississippi Baptist Convention Board	
Bluefield University	Bluefield, VA	Baptist General Association of Virginia	
Boston Baptist College	Boston, Massachusetts	Baptist Bible Fellowship International	
Boyce College	Louisville, Kentucky (run in conjunction with the Southern Baptist Theological Seminary)	Southern Baptist Convention	
Brewton–Parker Christian University	Mount Vernon, Georgia	Georgia Baptist Mission Board	
California Baptist University	Riverside, California	California Southern Baptist Convention	
Campbell University	Buies Creek, North Carolina	Baptist State Convention of North Carolina	
Carson-Newman University	Jefferson City, Tennessee	Tennessee Baptist Convention	
Cedarville University	Cedarville, Ohio	endorsed by the State Convention of Baptists in Ohio	
Central Baptist College	Conway, Arkansas	Baptist Missionary Association of America	
Charleston Southern University	Charleston, South Carolina	South Carolina Baptist Convention	
Chesapeake Baptist College and Seminary	Severn, Maryland	Independent Baptist	
Chowan University	Murfreesboro, North Carolina	Baptist State Convention of North Carolina	
Clear Creek Baptist Bible College	Pineville, Kentucky	Kentucky Baptist Convention	
Commonwealth Baptist College	Lexington, Kentucky	Clays Mill Baptist Church	
Criswell College	Dallas, Texas	Southern Baptists of Texas Convention	
Crown College	Powell, Tennessee	Independent Baptist	
University of the Cumberlands	Williamsburg, Kentucky	Kentucky Baptist Convention	
Dallas Baptist University	Dallas, Texas	Baptist General Convention of Texas	
East Texas Baptist University	Marshall, Texas	Baptist General Convention of Texas	
Faith Baptist Bible College and Theological Seminary	Ankeny, Iowa	General Association of Regular Baptist Churches (unofficially)	
Gateway Seminary	Mill Valley, California	Southern Baptist Convention	
Georgetown College	Georgetown, Kentucky	Kentucky Baptist Convention	
Golden State Baptist College	Santa Clara, California	Independent Baptist	
Hannibal-LaGrange University	Hannibal, Missouri	Missouri Baptist Convention	
Hardin-Simmons University	Abilene, Texas	Baptist General Convention of Texas	
Heartland Baptist Bible College	Oklahoma City, Oklahoma	Independent Baptist	
Houston Christian University	Houston, Texas	Baptist General Convention of Texas	
Howard Payne University	Brownwood, Texas	Baptist General Convention of Texas	
Indiana Baptist College	Greenwood, Indiana	Independent Baptist	
Jacksonville College	Jacksonville, Texas	Baptist Missionary Association of America	
Liberty University	Lynchburg, Virginia	Southern Baptist Convention of Virginia	
Louisiana Baptist University	Shreveport, Louisiana	Baptist Bible Fellowship International	
Louisiana Christian University	Pineville, Louisiana	Louisiana Baptist Convention	
Luther Rice University	Lithonia, Georgia	Independent Baptist	
Maranatha Baptist University	Watertown, Wisconsin	Fundamental Baptist Fellowship International (unofficially)	
Midwestern Baptist Theological Seminary	Kansas City, Missouri	Southern Baptist Convention	
Mission University	Springfield, Missouri	Baptist Bible Fellowship International	
Mississippi Christian University	Clinton, Mississippi	Mississippi Baptist Convention	
Missouri Baptist University	St. Louis, Missouri	Missouri Baptist Convention	
University of Mount Olive	Mount Olive, North Carolina	Original Free Will Baptist Convention	
New Orleans Baptist Theological Seminary	New Orleans, Louisiana	Southern Baptist Convention	
North Greenville University	Tigerville, South Carolina	South Carolina Baptist Convention	
Oakland City University	Oakland City, Indiana	General Association of General Baptists	
Oklahoma Baptist University	Shawnee, Oklahoma	Baptist General Convention of Oklahoma	
Ouachita Baptist University	Arkadelphia, Arkansas	Arkansas Baptist State Convention	
Pensacola Christian College	Pensacola, Florida	Independent Baptist	
Randall University	Moore, Oklahoma	National Association of Free Will Baptists	
Samford University	Birmingham, Alabama	Alabama Baptist Convention	
Shorter University	Rome, Georgia	Georgia Baptist Convention	
Southeastern Baptist College	Laurel, Mississippi	Baptist Missionary Association of Mississippi	
Southeastern Baptist Theological Seminary	Wake Forest, North Carolina	Southern Baptist Convention	
Southern Baptist Theological Seminary	Louisville, Kentucky	Southern Baptist Convention	
Southwest Baptist University	Bolivar, Missouri	Missouri Baptist Convention	
Southwestern Baptist Theological Seminary	Fort Worth, Texas	Southern Baptist Convention	
Trinity College of Jacksonville	Jacksonville, Florida	Independent Baptist	
Truett McConnell University	Cleveland, Georgia	Georgia Baptist Convention	
Union University	Jackson, Tennessee	Tennessee Baptist Convention	
University of Mary Hardin-Baylor	Belton, Texas	Baptist General Convention of Texas	
University of Mobile	Eight Mile, Alabama	Alabama Baptist Convention	
Wayland Baptist University	Plainview, Texas	Baptist General Convention of Texas	
West Coast Baptist College	Lancaster, California	Independent Baptist	
William Carey University	Hattiesburg, Mississippi	Mississippi Baptist Convention	
Williams Baptist University	Walnut Ridge, Arkansas	Arkansas Baptist State Convention	
Wingate University	Wingate, North Carolina	Baptist State Convention of North Carolina	
Yellowstone Christian College	Billings, Montana	Montana Southern Baptist Convention	
Ambassador Baptist College	Lattimore, North Carolina	Independent Baptist	

== Closed ==
Name	Location	Years of operation	Affiliation
Bethel College	Hopkinsville, Kentucky	1854–1964	
Clarks Summit University	Clarks Summit, Pennsylvania	1932–2024	Independent Baptist
Judson College	Marion, Alabama	1838–2021	
Mid-Continent University	Mayfield, Kentucky	1949–2014	
Mound Bayou Industrial College	Mound Bayou, Mississippi	1900–1936	General Baptist State Convention
New York Central College	McGraw, New York	1849–1860	
Northland International University	Dunbar, Wisconsin	1976–2015	
Old University of Chicago	Chicago	1857–1886	
Pillsbury Baptist Bible College	Owatonna, Minnesota	1957–2008	
Virginia Intermont College	Bristol, Virginia	1884–2014	

== Formerly affiliated ==
Name	Location	Years affiliated
Bates College	Lewiston, Maine	From 1855 to 1907 when the Maine Legislature amended the college's charter removing the requirement for the president and majority of the trustees to be Free Will Baptists, thereby allowing the school to qualify for Carnegie Foundation funding of professor's pensions.
Brown University	Providence, Rhode Island	1764-1942
Belmont University	Nashville, Tennessee	1890-2007
Campbellsville University	Campbellsville, Kentucky	1906-2014
Cornerstone University	Grand Rapids, Michigan	1941-1999
Furman University	Greenville, South Carolina	1825-1992
Mars Hill University	Asheville, North Carolina	1856-2008
Mercer University	Macon, Georgia	1833-2006
Meredith College	Raleigh, North Carolina	1891-1997
Shimer College	Chicago (formerly Mount Carroll, Illinois)	1896 to 1950s
Stetson University	DeLand, Florida	1885-1907, 1919-1995

== Works cited ==
- Self, Jerry M. (1996). "Baptist Colleges and Universities". In Hunt, Thomas C.; Carper, James C. (eds.). Religious Higher Education in the United States: A Source Book. Taylor & Francis. p. 261. ISBN 0815316364.

== See also ==
- Southern Baptist-related schools, colleges and universities
