= List of universities and colleges affiliated with the Southern Baptist Convention =

Universities, colleges, and seminaries currently affiliated with the Southern Baptist Convention or affiliated with state conventions that are associated with the SBC.

== Universities ==
The Southern Baptist Convention maintains a directory of Southern Baptist related colleges and universities.

- Anderson University (Anderson, South Carolina)
- Baptist University of Florida (Graceville, Florida)
- Baptist University of the Américas (San Antonio, Texas)
- Baylor University (Waco, Texas)
- Blue Mountain Christian University (Blue Mountain, Mississippi)
- Bluefield University (Bluefield, Virginia)
- Boyce College (Louisville, Kentucky)
- Brewton–Parker Christian University (Mount Vernon, Georgia)
- California Baptist University (Riverside, California)
- Carson–Newman University (Jefferson City, Tennessee)
- Cedarville University (Cedarville, Ohio)
- Charleston Southern University (Charleston, South Carolina)
- Clear Creek Baptist Bible College (Pineville, Kentucky)
- Criswell College (Dallas, Texas)
- Dallas Baptist University (Dallas, Texas)
- Davis College (Johnson City, New York)
- East Texas Baptist University (Marshall, Texas)
- Fruitland Baptist Bible College (Hendersonville, North Carolina)
- Hannibal–LaGrange University (Hannibal, Missouri)
- Hardin–Simmons University (Abilene, Texas)
- Houston Christian University (Houston, Texas)
- Howard Payne University (Brownwood, Texas)
- Jacksonville College (Jacksonville, Texas)
- Judson College (Wake Forest, North Carolina)
- Leavell College (New Orleans, Louisiana)
- Liberty University (Lynchburg, Virginia)
- Louisiana Christian University (Pineville, Louisiana)
- University of Mary Hardin-Baylor (Belton, Texas)
- Mississippi Christian University (Clinton, Mississippi)
- Missouri Baptist University (St. Louis, Missouri)
- University of Mobile (Mobile, Alabama)
- North Greenville University (Tigerville, South Carolina)
- Northeastern Baptist College (Bennington, Vermont)
- Oklahoma Baptist University (Shawnee, Oklahoma)
- Ouachita Baptist University (Arkadelphia, Arkansas)
- Shorter University (Rome, Georgia)
- Southwest Baptist University (Bolivar, Missouri)
- Spurgeon College (Kansas City, Missouri)
- Texas Baptist College (Fort Worth, Texas)
- Truett–McConnell University (Cleveland, Georgia)
- Union University (Jackson, Tennessee)
- Wayland Baptist University (Plainview, Texas)
- William Carey University (Hattiesburg, Mississippi)
- Williams Baptist University (Walnut Ridge, Arkansas)

== Seminaries ==
The SBC directly supports 6 theological seminaries.

- Gateway Seminary (Ontario, California)
- Midwestern Baptist Theological Seminary (Kansas City, Missouri)
- New Orleans Baptist Theological Seminary (New Orleans, Louisiana)
- Southeastern Baptist Theological Seminary (Wake Forest, North Carolina)
- Southern Baptist Theological Seminary (Louisville, Kentucky)
- Southwestern Baptist Theological Seminary (Fort Worth, Texas)
