= Paul Powell (minister) =

American Baptist minister (1933-2016)

- Born: 6 December 1933
- Died: 28 December 2016 (aged 83)

Paul W. Powell (December 6, 1933 – December 28, 2016) was the retired Dean of Baylor University's George W. Truett Theological Seminary. He earned a Bachelor of Arts degree from Baylor in 1956 and held a degree from Southwestern Baptist Theological Seminary. He received honorary degrees from Baylor, East Texas Baptist University, the University of Mary Hardin-Baylor, Campbell University and Dallas Baptist University.

The former president of the Robert M. Rogers Foundation of Dallas, Powell served on the foundation's board of directors. He retired in 1998 as president and chief executive officer of the Annuity Board of the Southern Baptist Convention and served in numerous offices with the Baptist General Convention of Texas, including a term as president from 1985 to 1987.

When Powell was president of the Baptist General Convention of Texas, he challenged Paige Patterson to allow him to review the "Heresy File", to which Patterson referred constantly. Powell found a list of eight men in the "Heresy File". Three were retired, leaving only five active in their work. And Powell said, "I am not saying that there were five liberals in the Southern Baptist Convention, I am saying that they were on Patterson's Heresy File list. They have spent ten years getting information, and I am assuming Patterson gave me his best. All of the so-called liberals could fit into a Volkswagen!"

Powell served as pastor at baptist churches in Tyler, Belfalls, Troy, Taylor and San Marcos, all in Texas. He served 17 years as pastor of Green Acres Baptist Church in Tyler.

The author of 36 books, Powell received Baylor's Distinguished Alumnus Award in 1988 and the Herbert H. Reynolds Award in 1999. In 1990 he was selected as Distinguished Alumnus of Southwestern Baptist Theological Seminary. He served on the boards of directors for Southside Bank and Mother Frances Hospital in Tyler.

Powell and his wife, Cathy, a 1956 Baylor graduate, had three children: Kent, Mike, and Lori; and three grandchildren: Jordan, Katie, and Matthew. He died from complications of a stroke on December 28, 2016, at age 83.

== Books ==
- A Digest for Church Renewal (English)
- A Digest for Church Renewal (Spanish)
- A Faith That Sings
- A Funny Thing Happened On the Way to Retirement
- Back to Bedrock (English)
- Back to Bedrock (Spanish)
- Basic Bible Sermons on Handling Conflict
- Beyond Conversion
- Building An Evangelistic Church
- The Complete Disciple
- The Church Today
- Death From The Other Side
- The Dynamic Disciple
- Getting the Lead Out of Leadership
- Go Givers in a Go Getter World
- Gospel For the Graveside
- How to Make Your Church Hum
- How To Start A Church Fire
- How To Survive A Storm
- If The Dead Could Speak
- I Like Being a Christian
- Jesus is For Now
- Joy Comes In The Morning
- Jump Starting Dead Churches
- "The Last Word (English)"
- "The Last Word (Spanish)"
- The Life Beyond
- "Looking at Life Through the Rear View Mirror (English)"
- "Looking at Life Through the Rear View Mirror (Spanish)"
- The New Minister's Manual
- The Night Cometh English
- The Night Cometh Spanish
- The Nuts and Bolts of Church Growth
- Pastor Search
- Rebuilding The Foundations
- Shepherding the Sheep in Smaller Churches(English)
- Shepherding the Sheep in Smaller Churches (Spanish)
- Special Sermons For Special Days
- Taking Stew Out of Stewardship
- Thee Old Time Religion
- The Great Deceiver
- The Saint Peter Principle
- This We Believe
- Why Me Lord
- When The Hurt Won't Go Away
