= WFBU-LP =

- Graceville, Florida; United States
- Frequency: 94.7 MHz

Programming
- Format: Christian radio

Ownership
- Owner: The Baptist College of Florida, Inc.

Technical information
- Licensing authority: FCC
- Facility ID: 135012
- Class: L1
- ERP: 100 watts
- HAAT: 29 meters (95 ft)
- Transmitter coordinates: 30°57′49″N 85°30′03″W

Links
- Public license information: LMS

WFBU-LP is a Christian radio station licensed to Graceville, Florida, broadcasting on 94.7 FM. The station is owned and operated by the Baptist College of Florida.
