= Buckner International =

- Founded: 1879
- Founder: R. C. Buckner
- Purpose: orphanage support, humanitarian aid, foster care and adoption
- Location: Dallas, Texas, United States
- Region served: Worldwide
- Method: Aid
- Revenue: U.S. $74 million
- Employees: 110
- Volunteers: 11,400
- Website: www.buckner.org

Buckner International is a non-profit International Christian charitable organization. Founded as a Baptist organization it maintains a relationship with the Baptist General Convention of Texas (indirectly with the Southern Baptist Convention via the BGCT), the Cooperative Baptist Fellowship, and the Baptist World Alliance though it works with individuals and organizations of all denominations and faiths. The organization is headquartered in Dallas, Texas and has annual revenues exceeding $74 million.

== History ==
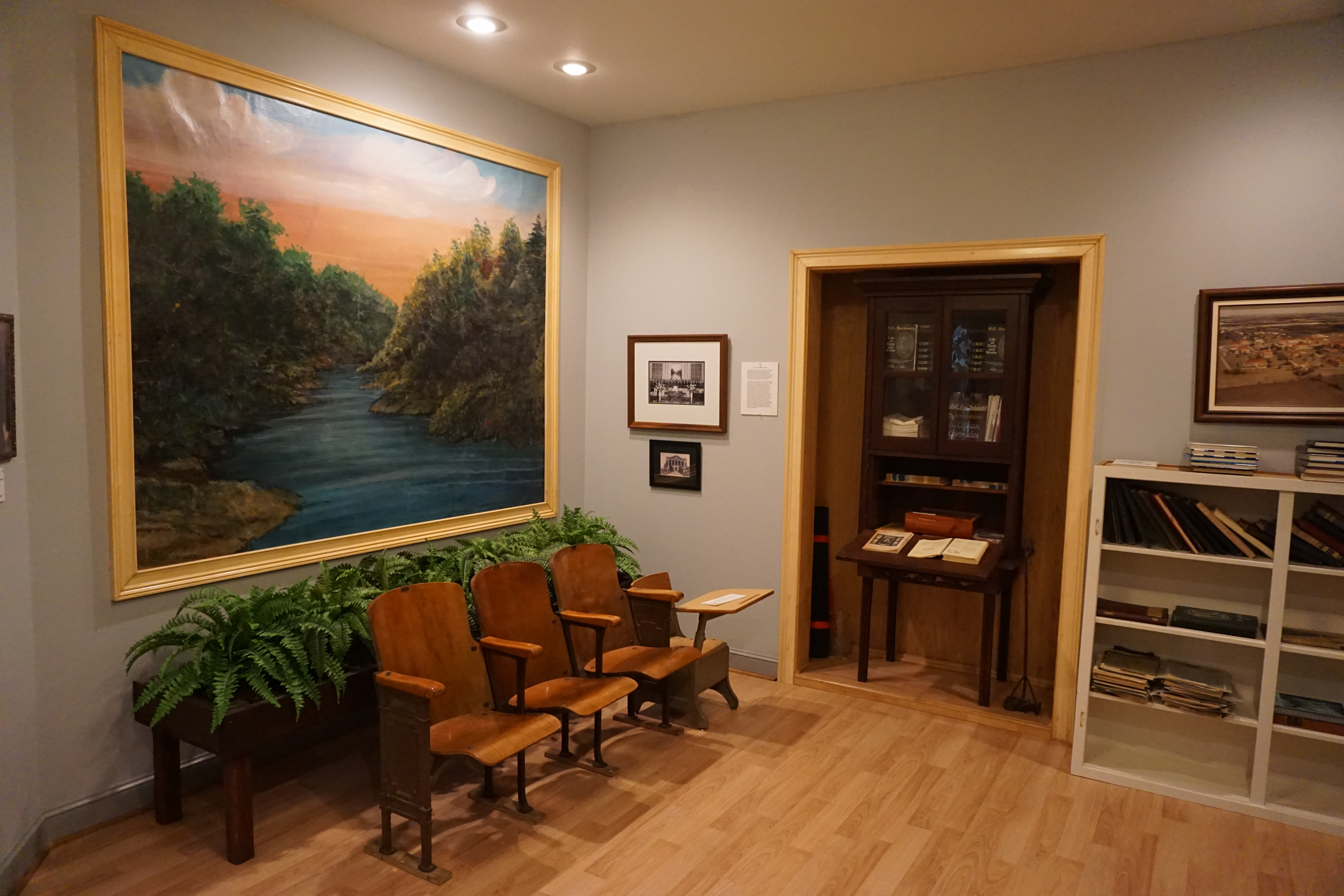
The Buckner Memorial Room at the Lamar County Historical Museum

The organization was founded in 1879 by Baptist preacher R. C. Buckner in Paris, Texas. He felt the need for a local Orphans home and brought up the issue at a meeting of Baptist Deacons. With $27 raised he opened up the first home in Dallas, Texas in 1879. Since that time Buckner International has grown to become an international Christian organization with multiple focuses.

In January 2020, Buckner CEO Albert Reyes was a keynote speaker at the Longview Chamber of Commerce Banquet held at the Maude Cobb Convention and Activity Center.

In February 2020, Buckner International announced a collaboration with Howard Payne University to provide volunteer and mission opportunities, humanitarian aid drives and experiential learning opportunities for HPU students.

== Projects ==
Buckner International has various projects going on world-wide.

=== U.S. Foster Care & Adoption ===
Since the organization's founding, serving the children of Texas has been a primary mission. Buckner International is a private adoption agency licensed by the Texas Department of Family and Protective Services. It provides domestic and international adoption services, foster care, and support services. It provides services to over 2,000 individuals receiving pre-adoption services and 1,000 individuals receiving post-adoption services.

=== U.S. Family Outreach ===
Buckner's TRAIL & PAL programs assist young adults transitioning out of foster care into independent living. Buckner Family Place and Buckner Family Pathways provides single mothers with affordable housing and support while seeking higher education. The "Mi Escuelita" program focuses on teaching English as a second language to at-risk children from diverse backgrounds. The organization also frequently coordinates medical mission trips and disaster relief when needed.

=== International programs ===
Buckner's main international ministry is "Shoes for Orphan Souls". Providing new shoes and socks to orphans and at-risk children in need in 68 countries around the world since 1999, it has distributed over two million pairs of shoes and socks to children worldwide. Buckner also operates a number of community programs internationally aimed at preserving families and keeping them intact.
