= Lamar County Historical Museum =

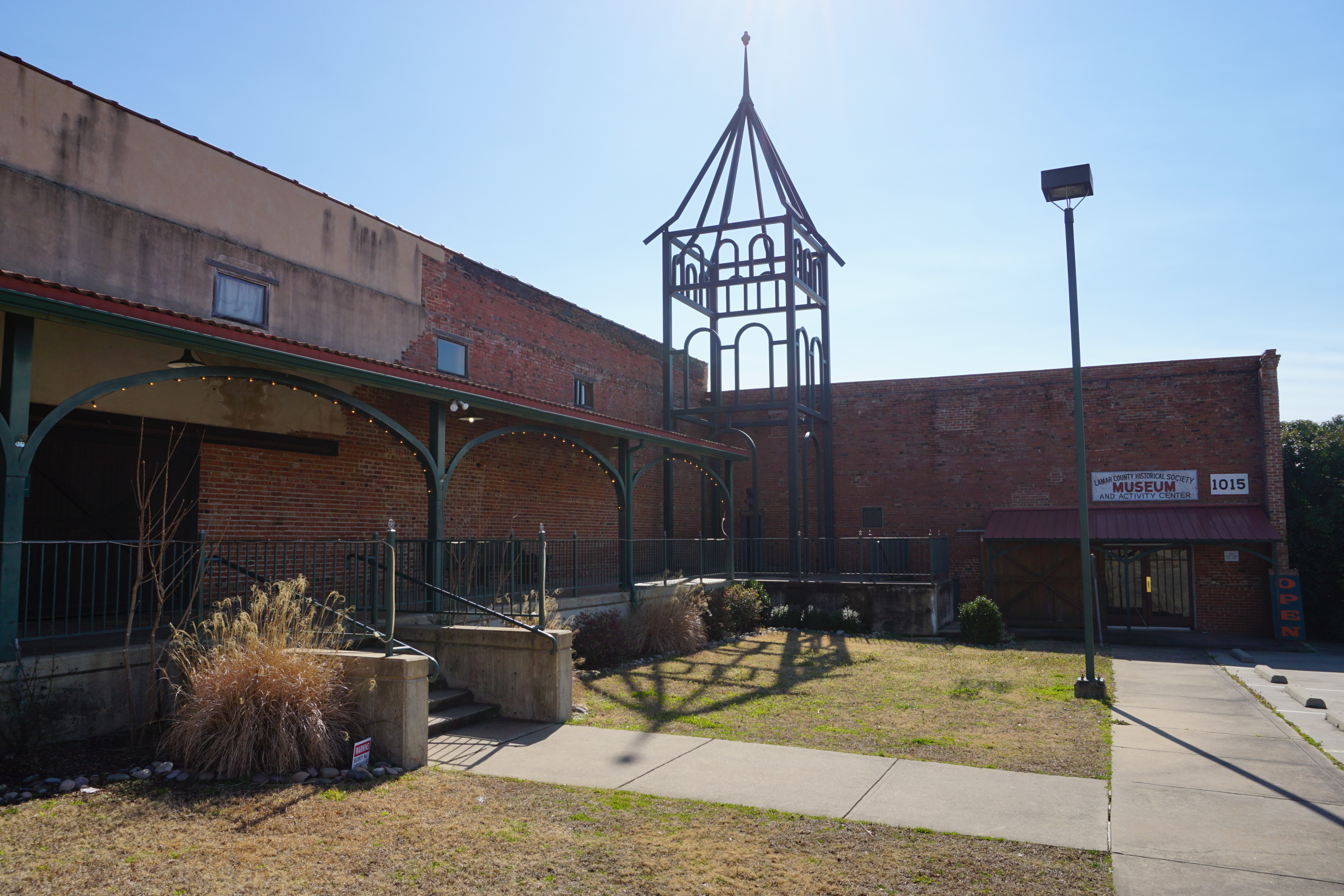
- Exterior of the Lamar County Historical Museum

- Location within Texas
- Location: Paris, Texas
- Coordinates: 33.659142°N 95.566144°W
- Type: Local history museum
- Website: www.lchsparistx.org

The Lamar County Historical Museum is a local history museum that documents Lamar County, Texas, and its county seat, Paris. It is located on West Kaufman Street in an area of Paris known as Heritage Park, where it is situated immediately south of Heritage Hall. The museum is operated by the Lamar County Historical Society. It is open between 10 am and 4 pm on Saturdays only, and while it does not charge an admission fee, it does accept donations.

The museum was the brainchild of William Hayden, a philanthropist and art aficionado from the area, and is staffed by volunteers. It includes six galleries and a rural life section in addition to exhibitions.

The museum includes numerous historical artifacts, including a postcard display with over 200 postcards, a shoe collection, and entire rooms dedicated to the county's African American heritage and military history as well as life in Paris before it was devastated by a major fire in 1916. In addition to the 1916 fire, the museum also documents two other significant disasters in the city's history, an earlier fire in 1877 and a tornado in 1982. Its collections cover both the distant and the more recent past, spanning from the Biard Cabin, which was built in 1846, and reconstructions of a pioneer kitchen and a blacksmith shop to a Sonic Drive-In menu and a neon sign from Staples Jewelry.

Other artifacts showcased by the Lamar County Historical Museum include early 20th century furniture, antique washing machines, a loom, and various tools. The museum also displays implements used for cotton and hay farming, relics from the Buckner Orphanage, which was demolished in 2000, the Judge Jim Noble Thompson Portico facade, an iron lung, and a gallery documenting Lamar County's smaller communities.

== Gallery ==
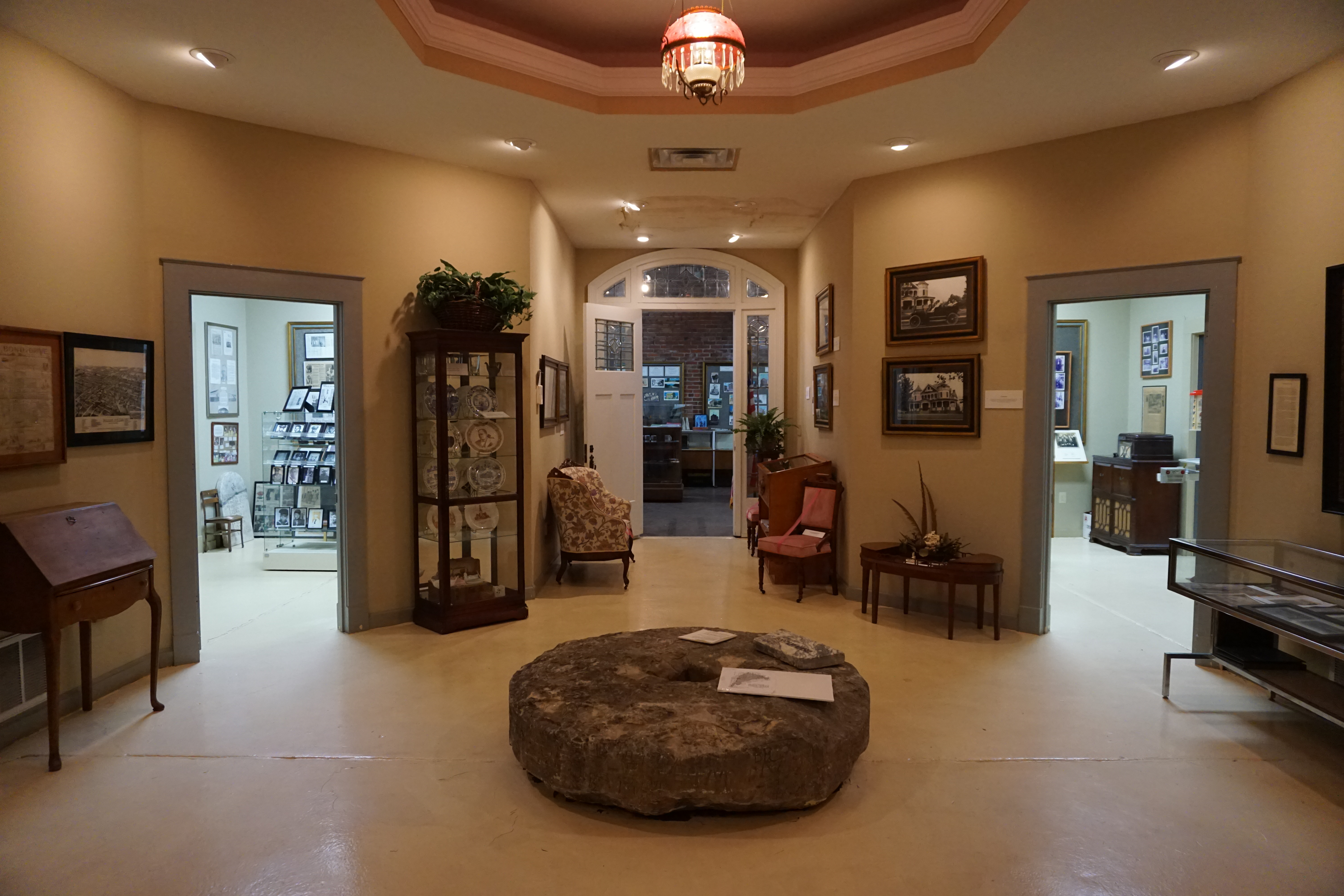
Interior

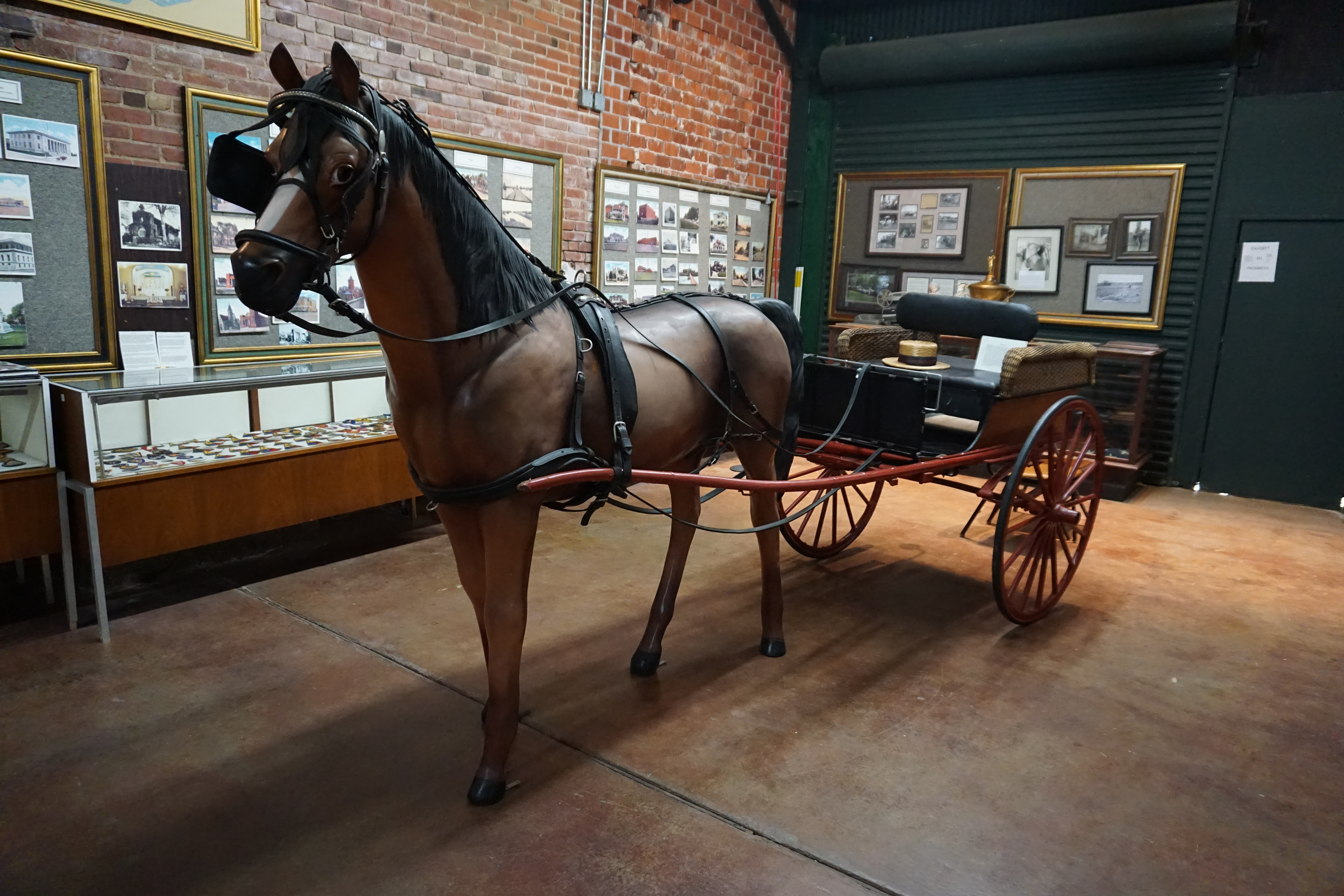
Searight buggy

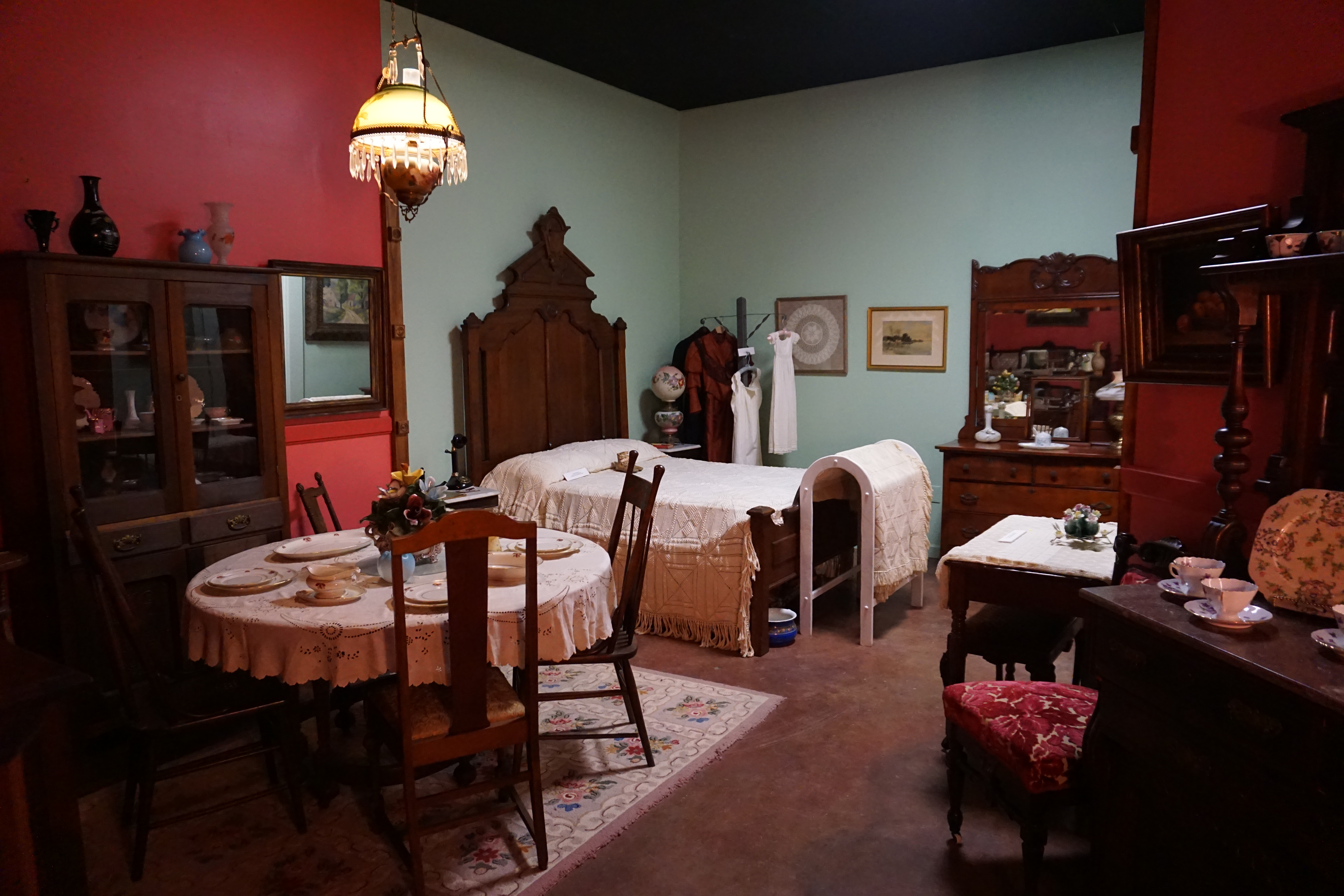
Swaim rooms

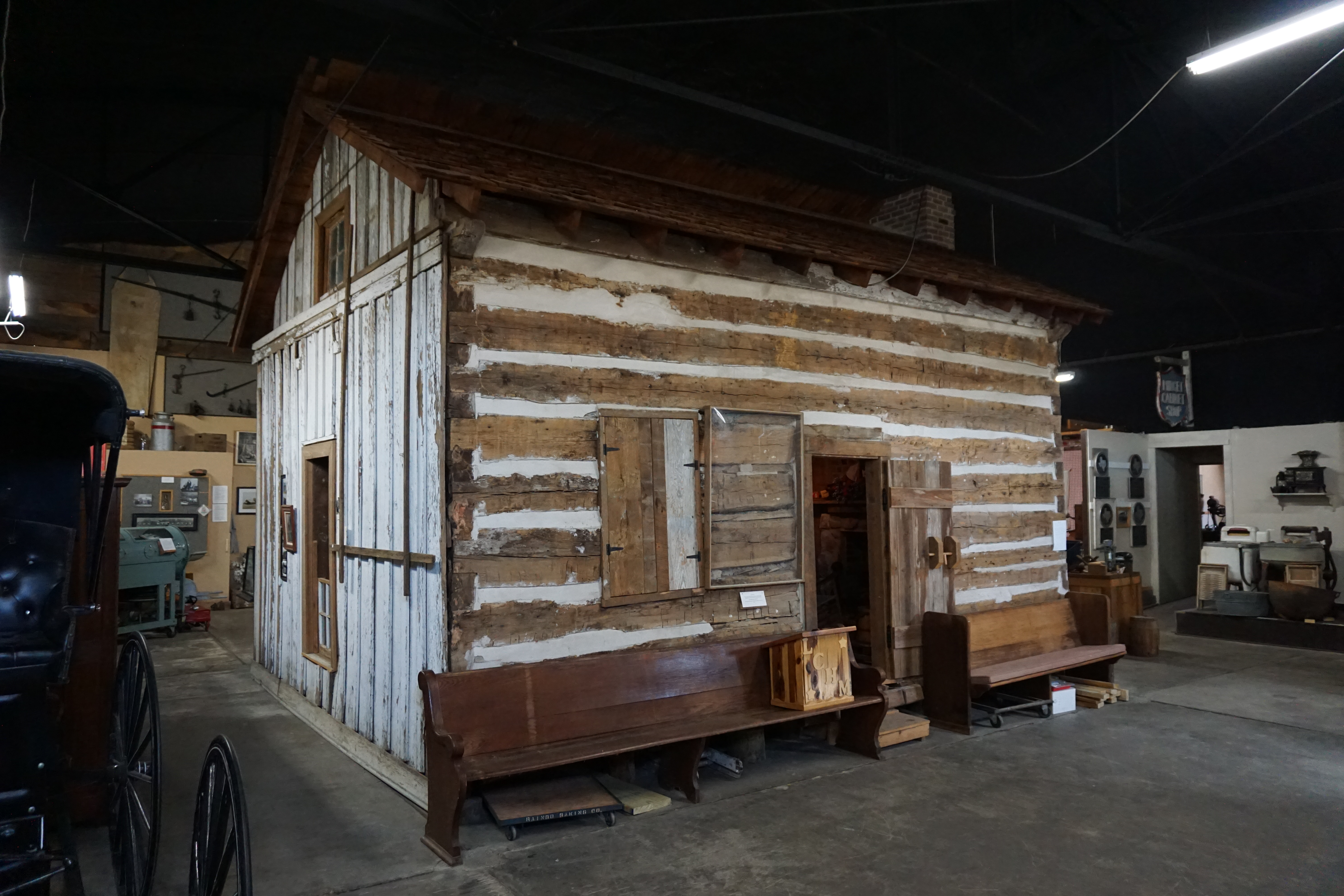
Biard Cabin

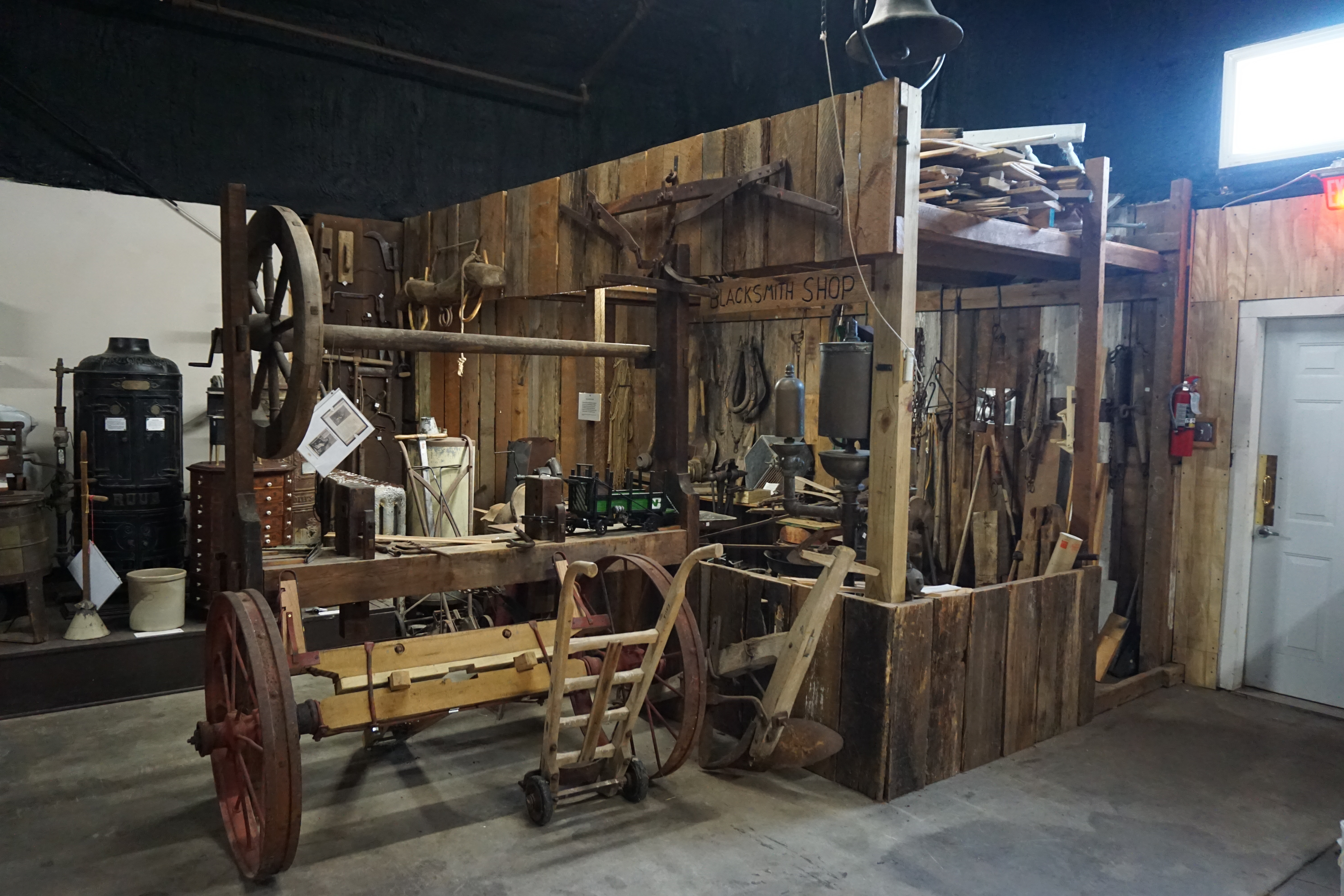
Blacksmith shop

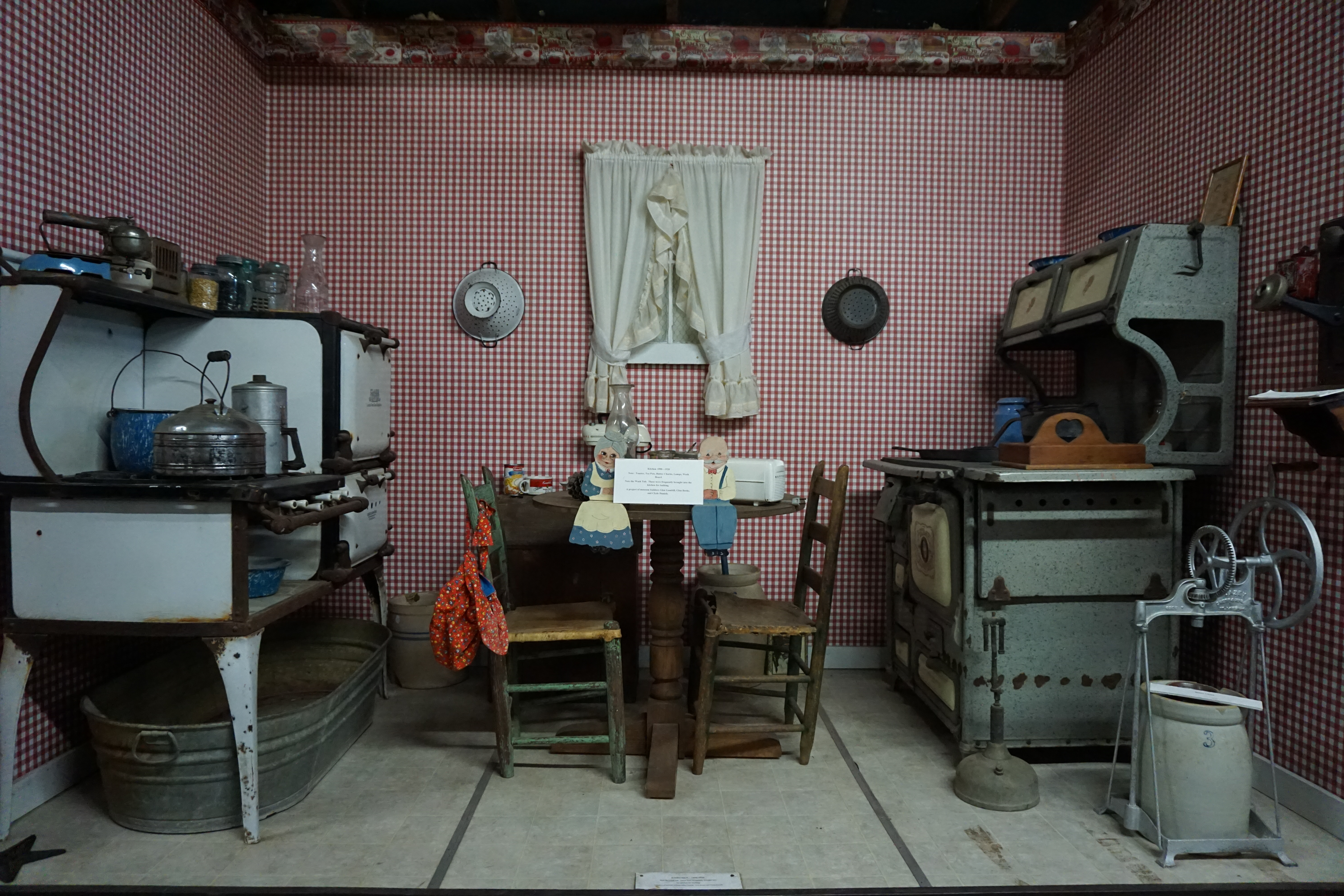
Pioneer kitchen
