= Samuel Augustus Hayden =

Samuel Augustus Hayden (1839–1918) was a Baptist pastor, denominational leader and newspaper publisher. Hayden was born in Washington Parish, Louisiana, U.S. on April 7, 1839. He was the son of Allen and Nancy McLendon Hayden. S. A. Hayden married Mary Guion Relya on July 2, 1868 and five children were born to them.

After service in the army of the Confederate States of America, he served as a pastor and teacher in Louisiana. He came to Texas in 1874. He pastored churches in Paris, Galveston, and Dallas.

He purchased the newspaper Texas Baptist from Robert Cooke Buckner in 1883. Thereafter Hayden became a chief proponent of consolidating the five regional bodies, the two newspapers, and the two schools of Baptists in Texas. The consolidation of Baptist bodies was effected in 1886, with the formation of the Baptist General Convention of Texas. After this consolidation, Hayden purchased the other newspaper, J. B. Link's Texas Baptist Herald, and changed the name to Texas Baptist and Herald. J. Frank Norris bought the paper in 1907 and it was no longer published after 1908.

Hayden and his paper played a major part in a controversy among Texas Baptists at the end of the 19th century. Hayden and others became convinced of financial mismanagement on the part of the corresponding secretary of the Convention and other improprieties associated with the missions board. Through his newspaper he waged war on those activities he thought improper. Hayden was denied a seat as a delegate at the 1897 State Convention, and was eventually expelled from it. This controversy led to the formation of the Baptist Missionary Association of Texas (see Baptist Missionary Association). This association was formed against the advice of Hayden, who wanted to continue the fight within the Convention. Hayden sued over his unseating, which resulted in two hung juries and two victories. Though the victories were appealed, the court actions ended in 1905, when J. B. Cranfill made an out of court settlement and paid $300 to Hayden.

Samuel Augustus Hayden died in Dallas, Texas on October 10, 1918.
