= Todd D. Still =

American biblical scholar (born 1965)

Todd Dixon Still (born 1966) is an American New Testament scholar and serves as the Charles J. and Eleanor McLerran DeLancey Dean and the William M. Hinson Professor of Christian Scriptures at the George W. Truett Theological Seminary of Baylor University. He is also a licensed and ordained Baptist minister.

== Biography ==
Still was born in Texas and received his BA in Greek and Sociology from Baylor University in 1988. In 1991 he earned the M.Div. with Biblical Languages from Southwestern Baptist Theological Seminary in Fort Worth, Texas. He studied for his Ph.D. at the University of Glasgow in Scotland under John M. G. Barclay, graduating in 1996. Still has also done additional graduate study at Cambridge University and the University of St. Andrews.

Still taught at Dallas Baptist University in Texas from 1995 to 2000 and at Gardner–Webb University's School of Divinity in North Carolina from 2000 to 2003. He joined the faculty of Baylor University's George W. Truett Theological Seminary in 2003, receiving tenure in 2006 and becoming Truett's fifth dean in 2015. Still's areas of specialty include the Apostle Paul, the history of early Christianity, and social-scientific hermeneutics. Additionally, Still has served at various churches in staff and volunteer positions.

== Selected works ==
=== Books ===
- Still, Todd D., and Bruce Longenecker. Thinking Through Paul: An Introduction to His Life, Letters, and Theology. Grand Rapids: Zondervan, 2014.
- Still, Todd D. Philippians & Philemon. Smyth & Helwys Bible Commentary 27b. Macon, GA: Smyth & Helwys, 2011.
- ——— “Colossians.” pp. 263–360 in The Expositor’s Bible Commentary: Ephesians–Philemon Vol. 12. Eds. Tremper Longman and David E. Garland. 13 vols. Rev. ed. Grand Rapids: Zondervan, 2006.
- ——— Conflict at Thessalonica: A Pauline Church and its Neighbours. Journal for the Study of the New Testament Supplement Series 183. Sheffield: Sheffield Academic Press, 1999.

=== Editorial work ===
==== General editor ====
- ———, ed. Reading the New Testament Commentary Series. Macon, GA: Smyth & Helwys Publishers.

==== General co-editor ====
- ———; Mark Goodacre, eds. New International Greek Commentary Series. Grand Rapids: Eerdmans.
- ———; William H. Bellinger, eds. Baylor Annotated Study Bible. Waco, TX: Baylor University Press.

==== Sole editor ====
- ———, ed. God and Israel: Providence and Purpose in Romans 9-11. Waco, TX: Baylor University Press, 2017.
- ———, ed. Texts and Contexts: Gospels and Pauline Studies and Sermons in Honor of David E. Garland. Waco, TX: Baylor University Press, 2017.
- ———, ed. Jesus and Paul Reconnected: Fresh Pathways into an Old Debate. Grand Rapids: Eerdmans, 2007.

==== Co-editor ====
- ———; David E. Wilhite, eds. The Apostolic Fathers and Paul. Pauline and Patristics Scholars in Debate, vol. 2. London/New York: Bloomsbury T&T Clark, 2016.
- ———; Ben Witherington III, eds. The Epistles of 2 Corinthians and 1 Peter: Newly Discovered Commentaries by J. B. Lightfoot. The Lightfoot Legacy Set, vol. 3. Downers Grove, IL: InterVarsity, 2016.
- ———; Ben Witherington III, eds. The Gospel of St. John: A Newly Discovered Commentary by J. B. Lightfoot. The Lightfoot Legacy Set, vol. 2. Downers Grove, IL: InterVarsity, 2015.
- ———; Ben Witherington III, eds. The Acts of the Apostles: A Newly Discovered Commentary by J. B. Lightfoot. The Lightfoot Legacy Set, vol. 1. Downers Grove, IL: InterVarsity, 2014.
- ———; David E. Wilhite, eds. Tertullian and Paul. Pauline and Patristics Scholars in Debate, vol. 1. London/New York: Bloomsbury T&T Clark, 2013.
- ———; David G. Horrell, eds. After The First Urban Christians: The Social-Scientific Study of Pauline Christianity Twenty-Five Years Later. London/New York: T&T Clark, 2009.
- ———; W. Dennis Tucker, Jr., eds. Image and Word: Reflections on the Stained Glass in the Paul W. Powell Chapel. Waco, TX: Baylor University Press, 2009.
