= R. C. Buckner =

American Baptist minister

Robert Cooke Buckner (1833–1919) was an American Baptist minister and founder of the Buckner Baptist Children's Home.

== Biography ==
Buckner was born on January 3, 1833, in Madisonville, Tennessee to Daniel and Mary (Hampton) Buckner. He attended Somerset Seminary in Cleveland, Tennessee, and Georgetown College in Kentucky. Ordained at seventeen, he served as a pastor in Albany, Owensboro, and Salvisa, Kentucky, before relocating to Paris, Texas, in 1859.

In Texas, Buckner served as pastor of the Paris Baptist Church for fourteen years. He also founded a newspaper, the Religious Messenger, later renamed Texas Baptist (and subsequently Texas Baptist and Herald), which he edited until 1883.

In 1875, Buckner moved to Dallas to establish a Baptist orphanage. He authored the charter for the Buckner Orphans Home, which opened in 1879 with three children. He managed this home until his death in 1919, by which time it had housed approximately 12,000 children.

Buckner was among the founders of the Dickson Colored Orphanage in Gilmer, Upshur County, in 1900, serving as its board president until 1905 and remaining a board member afterwards. His administrative roles extended to serving as president of the Baptist General Association of Texas for twenty years and contributing to the establishment of Texas Baptist Memorial Sanitarium (now Baylor University Medical Center), where he was board president from 1904 to 1907. He also held a trustee position at Baylor University and was involved with the National Prison Congress and the national Convention for Charities and Corrections.

Buckner, a Mason and member of Hella Temple of the Shrine, died in Dallas on April 9, 1919, and was buried at Grove Hill Cemetery.

== Legacy ==
R.C. Buckner Founder's Day Award is named after him.
