= Kyle Lake =

American pastor and author (1972–2005)

- Born: Jeffrey Kyle Lake; June 12, 1972; Tyler, Texas, U.S.
- Died: October 30, 2005 (aged 33); Waco, Texas, U.S.
- Education: Baylor University (BA); George W. Truett Theological Seminary (M.Div)
- Occupations: Pastor; author
- Years active: 1995–2005
- Spouse: Jennifer Gornto (m. 1998)
- Children: 3
- Church: Christianity (Baptist)
- Congregations served: University Baptist Church

Kyle Lake (June 12, 1972 – October 30, 2005) was an American Baptist pastor and author. He was pastor of University Baptist Church in Waco, Texas, until his death in 2005. He was considered part of the Emerging church movement.

== Biography ==
Jeffery Kyle Lake was born on June 12, 1972, in Tyler, Texas, to David and Shirley Lake. He attended Andy Woods Elementary and graduated from Robert E. Lee High School in 1990 where he was co-captain of the state runner-up Lee Soccer Team. On May 30, 1998, he married Jennifer Gornto of Clear Lake, Texas. Lake earned a bachelor's degree in Speech Communications and Religion from Baylor University in 1994 before receiving a Master of Divinity degree from George W. Truett Theological Seminary in 1997.

=== Ministry ===
Kyle Lake was pastor of University Baptist Church, founded in 1995 by Chris Seay and Christian recording artist David Crowder. Lake closed his sermons with the phrase "Love God, Embrace Beauty, and Live Life to the Fullest," a benediction that is still recited by the church at the end of every service.

Lake was known for two published books, Understanding God's Will: How To Hack The Equation Without Formulas (2004) and (RE)Understanding Prayer: A Fresh Approach to Conversation With God (2005).

Lake was also known for his ability to reach out to younger audiences such as the college-age crowd, and was a main worship leader in the collegiate Passion movement. Many students said they were drawn to his ability to preach the gospel in a way young people could understand and easily relate to their own lives.

=== Personal life ===
He and his wife Jennifer (née Gornto) had three children—a daughter named Avery, and twin boys, Jude and Sutton Lake.

=== Death ===
Lake was electrocuted on October 30, 2005, as he stepped into baptismal waters and reached out to adjust a microphone. Ben Dudley, community pastor at University Baptist, told the Waco Tribune-Herald that, "At first, there was definitely confusion just because everyone was trying to figure out what was going on" and that "Everyone just immediately started praying."

The 800 people attending the baptism event was larger than usual because of homecoming activities at nearby Baylor University. Doctors in the congregation rushed to Lake when he collapsed; he was transported to Hillcrest Baptist Medical Center, where he was pronounced dead. The woman Lake was preparing to baptize was also taken to the hospital, but she was not seriously injured; it is believed that she had not yet stepped into the water when the electrocution happened.

At a remembrance attended by about 1,000 people that night at First Baptist Church Waco, Dudley told the UBC congregation that they would move forward as a church. "I don't know how, when, why, where or what's going to happen, but we will continue as a church in the community because that is what Kyle would have wanted."

== Movie ==
In the spring of 2006, several Baylor University students and friends of Kyle created a short film based on his last sermon titled "Kyle's Film". David Crowder Band and Robbie Seay Band provided the music for the film, which features a montage of artistic images narrated to Lake's last sermon.

== Book ==
In 2011, a book about his life, "That's Kyle", is published by his father, David Lake.

== See also ==
- Emerging Church

== Published works ==
- (RE)Understanding Prayer: A Fresh Approach to Conversation With God, 2005 (Relevant Books) ISBN 0976364263
- Understanding God's Will: How To Hack The Equation Without Formulas, 2004 (Relevant Books) ISBN 978-0974694269
