= Texas Department of Family and Protective Services =

Department of Family and Protective Services

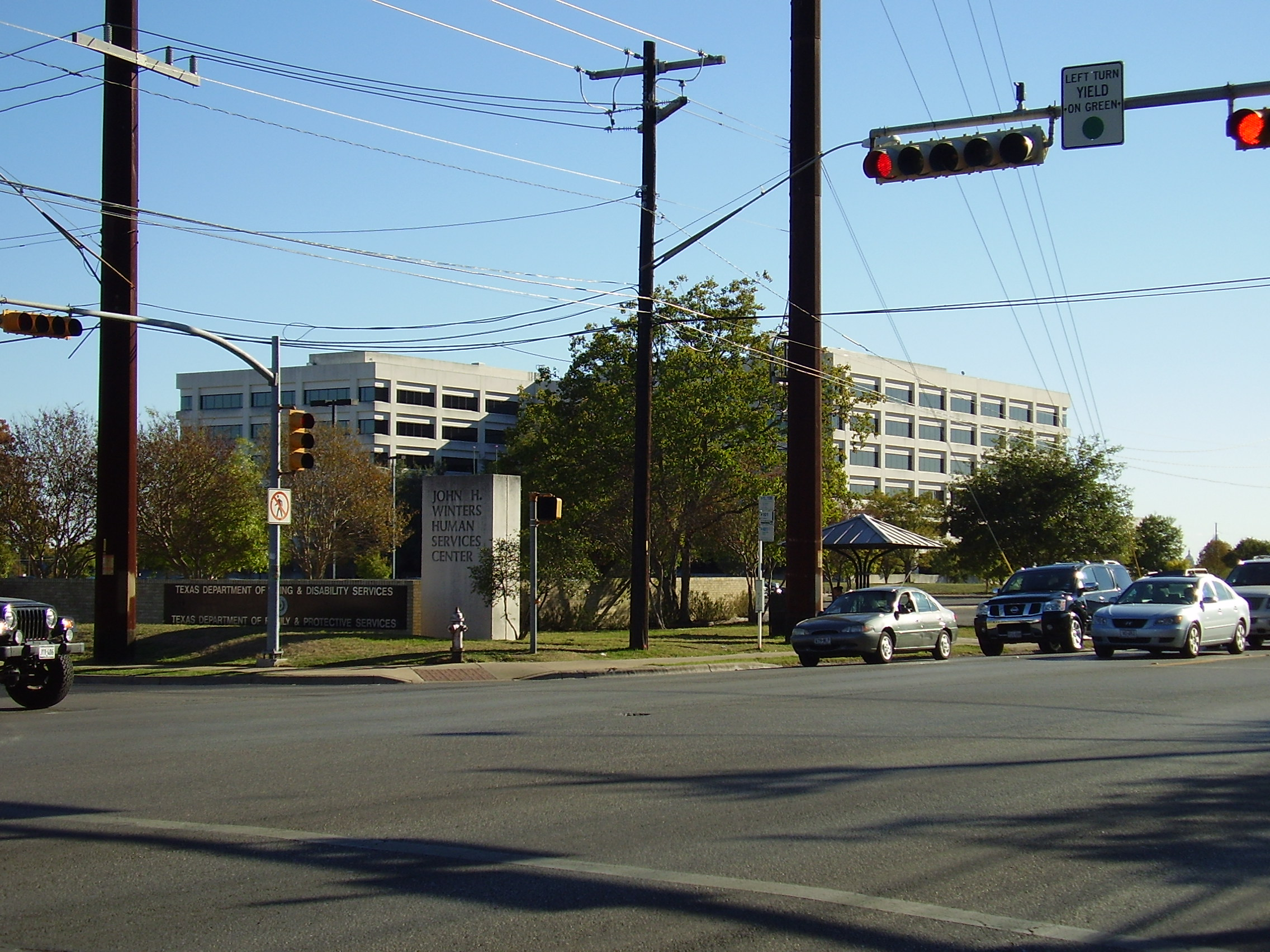
- John H. Winters Human Services Center

Agency overview
- Preceding agencies: Department of Protective and Regulatory Services; Department of Human Services
- Jurisdiction: Statewide
- Headquarters: Austin, Texas
- Employees: 12,740 (2018)
- Annual budget: $2,026,476,529 USD (2018)
- Agency executive: Stephanie Muth, Commissioner
- Child agencies: Child Protective Services; Adult Protective Services; Statewide Intake
- Website: Official website

The Texas Department of Family and Protective Services (DFPS) is responsible for investigating charges of abuse, neglect or exploitation of children, the elderly, and adults with disabilities. Prior to its creation in 2004, the agency had been called the Texas Department of Protective and Regulatory Services (DPRS).

According to federal judge Janis Graham Jack, the Texas DFPS is "a system where rape, abuse, psychotropic medication, and instability are the norm". According to the Texas Attorney General, DFPS is neither a juvenile nor an adult criminal justice agency. The Texas Juvenile Justice Department is the state juvenile justice agency, while the Texas Department of Criminal Justice is the adult justice agency.

The agency is headquartered at the John H. Winters Human Services Center at 701 West 51st Street in Austin.

== Mandate ==
The DFPS undertakes five major tasks:

- Adult protective services
- Child protective services
- Child care licensing
- Prevention and early intervention
- Statewide intake

== History ==
It was created effective February 1, 2004 by House Bill 2292 of the 78th Texas Legislature (2003) as the first new agency in a major reorganization of Texas's health and human services system. The change was made to help "consolidate organizational structures and functions, eliminate duplicative administrative systems, and streamline processes and procedures that guide the delivery of health and human services to Texans."

=== Comptroller findings ===
DFPS has a documented history of issues with children placed in its care. A 2004 report by Texas Comptroller Carole Keeton Strayhorn was very critical of the Texas foster care system. A follow-up statement with continued criticisms of the Texas foster care system was made in 2006 by the Comptroller and renewed a request to have the governor create a Family and Protective Services Crisis Management Team.

The Comptroller stated that in fiscal 2003, 2004 and 2005, respectively 30, 38 and 48 foster children died in the state's care. The number of foster children in the state's care increased 24 percent to 32,474 in Fiscal 2005, while the number of deaths increased 60 percent. Compared to the general population, a child is four times more likely to die in the Texas foster care system. In 2004, about 100 children were treated for poisoning from medications; 63 were treated for rape that occurred while under state care including four-year-old twin boys, and 142 children gave birth. A 12-year-old boy died in December 2005, suffocated while being restrained from behind by an employee of the facility. Another died May 30, after drowning in a creek during a bicycle outing. A three-year-old was treated for poisoning from an atypical, mind-altering anti-psychotic drug.

The Comptroller's office also found significant financial problems in a 2005 audit of DFPS.

=== YFZ Ranch FLDS raid ===
Gene Grounds of Victim Relief Ministries reported no hysteria or crying from children removed from the ranch. He commended CPS workers as exhibiting compassion, professionalism and caring concern.

John Kight, chairman of an organization that provided mental health workers to assist FLDS children and mothers from the YFZ Ranch recounted to the Texas governor's office that DFPS' Child Protective Services had seemed out of control at the temporary shelters, describing "how abusive CPS was and how they've trampled all over their rights." One of the workers who assisted at the shelter remarked that "wonderful loving women and children are being treated like convicts in a concentration camp by the state of Texas". Another wrote "I have never seen women and children treated this poorly, not to mention their civil rights being disregarded in this manner" after assisting at the emergency shelter. "The CPS workers were openly rude to the mothers and children, yelled at them for tryin to wave to friends.. threatened them with arrest if they did not stop waving" Workers took notes on everything the "guests" said. Some compared it to a prison or concentration camp. By contrast, one worker noted the children were "amazingly clean, happy, healthy, energetic, well behaved and self-confident," while the mothers were "consistently calm, patient and loving with their children."

Ultimately, both the Court of Appeals for the Third District and the Texas Supreme Court found that CPS improperly removed all the children and ordered them returned to their parents.

Caregivers who were previously forbidden to discuss conditions working with CPS later produced unsigned written reports expressed anger at the CPS traumatizing the children, and for disregarding rights of mothers who appeared to be parents of healthy, well-behaved children. CPS threatened some workers with arrest, and the entire mental health support was dismissed the second week due to being "too compassionate." Workers believed poor sanitary conditions at the shelter allowed respiratory infections and chicken pox to spread.

After being removed from the temporary shelters the FLDS children were placed in 16 group shelters and foster homes. Minors with children were sent to the Seton Home in San Antonio, older boys to Cal Farley's Boys Ranch in Amarillo. Some parents stated on the Today Show that they were unable to visit their boys due to a shortage of CPS staff. Newspapers released names of facilities caring for the FLDS children that have requested donations of specific items, help or cash.

=== 2011 lawsuit ===
The DFPS has also been the subject of a recent lawsuit alleging, among other complaints, that foster children are inappropriately placed in restrictive institutional settings. In 2011, Children's Rights, a New York-based national advocacy group working to reform child welfare systems, filed a federal class action lawsuit in the U.S. District Court for the Southern District of Texas alleging the DFPS routinely fails to either return children who've been in foster care at least a year safely to their families or to find them safe, appropriate, and permanent new families. They also claim that after approximately one year, or a maximum of 18 months, without successfully reunifying children with their birth families or finding them adoptive homes, children become permanent wards of the state, a status known as "permanent managing conservatorship" (PMC), and that after entering this permanent foster care status, many children have little hope for stable, permanent families and instead are shuffled between a variety of foster and institutional placements that are poorly supervised by the state.

== See also ==
- Adoption
- Adult Protective Services
- Child Protective Services
- Foster care
- Government of Texas
- Social work
- Buckner International
