= Georgia Purdom =

American biologist

Georgia Purdom (née Hickman; born 1972) is an American biologist and Young Earth creationist. She is the director of Educational Content at Answers in Genesis.

== Early life ==
Purdom was born in 1972, and grew up near Columbus, Ohio in what she described as a "very strong Christian home". She attended a Nazarene church.

== Education and career ==
Purdom studied at Cedarville University, graduating in 1994, before going on to get a PhD in molecular genetics from Ohio State University. She was an associate professor of biology at Mount Vernon Nazarene University before joining Answers in Genesis. She received the Alumna of the Year award from Cedarville in 2015.

== Views ==
Purdom believes that whether one holds a "biblical versus secular" worldview determines how one interprets scientific data. She also believes that "available evidence supports and confirms biblical creation."

She is the editor of Galapagos Islands: A Different View (2013) which presents a "Bible-based analysis of the islands." Purdom claims that the Galápagos Islands were formed after the Genesis Flood.

Purdom distinguishes her creationist views with that of intelligent design, which she does not regard as Christian.

Purdom claimed that "mutations don’t cause the gain of novel traits—the gain of genetic information—necessary to change from one kind of organism into another" without providing any evidence for that claim. In fact, there are numerous studies demonstrating exactly such changes, especially supported by phylogenetic studies and genome analyses. For instance, novel morphological features are easily selected for in dog breeding and their genetic basis has been well documented. Many other examples are documented in studies on macro-evolution.

== Scientific work ==
Purdom has published two studies that are indexed in Pubmed, all of which apparently resulted from her thesis work at Ohio State University. All three investigate the role of microphthalmia transcription factor (MITF), a protein that regulates gene expression during osteoclast differentiation. None of this work is directly related to evolutionary biology, although the studies show that they are fully compatible with the evolution of gene regulatory networks.
