= Montana Southern Baptist Convention =

The Montana Southern Baptist Convention is a group of churches affiliated with the Southern Baptist Convention located in the U.S. state of Montana. Headquartered in Billings, it is made up of about 140 churches.

In 2025, it was made up of five Baptist associations; the director was Barrett Duke.

== Associations ==
- Big Sky Association
- Glacier Baptist Association
- Hi-Line Association
- Treasure State Baptist Association
- Triangle Baptist Association
- Yellowstone Baptist Association

== Affiliated organizations ==
- The Baptist Foundation of Montana: the foundation offers investment management services to the Montana Southern Baptist Convention, associations, and member churches
- The Montana Baptist: the e-newspaper of the convention
- montana.e-quip.net: an on-line learning community
- Yellowstone Baptist College: a learning institution founded in 1974 to provide Christ-centered education
