= Baptist General Convention of Texas =

Baptist body in Texas

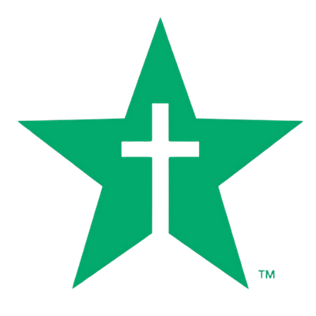
- Classification: Protestant
- Orientation: Baptist
- Scripture: Protestant Bible
- Theology: Evangelical Baptist
- Polity: Congregational
- Governance: Executive Board
- Executive Director: Julio Guarneri
- Associations: Southern Baptist Convention, Baptist World Alliance
- Region: Texas
- Headquarters: Dallas, Texas
- Origin: June 29, 1886
- Separations: Southern Baptists of Texas Convention
- Congregations: 5,375 (2023)
- Members: 2,038,537 (2023)
- Hospitals: 9
- Tertiary institutions: 9
- Seminaries: George W. Truett Theological Seminary
- Other name: Texas Baptists
- Official website: texasbaptists.org

The Baptist General Convention of Texas (BGCT), more commonly known as the Texas Baptists, is a Baptist Christian denomination in the U.S. state of Texas and is one of several Texas-based state convention affiliates of the Southern Baptist Convention (SBC), the other state-wide convention being the Southern Baptists of Texas Convention (SBTC). It is affiliated with the Southern Baptist Convention and the Baptist World Alliance. Texas Baptist offices are located in the city of Dallas, though convention staff are located across the state. According to a denomination census released in 2023, it claimed 2,038,537 members and 5,375 churches

== History ==
There were Baptists among the first Anglo-American settlers of Texas, but under Spain (and later Mexico), non-Catholic religious worship was prohibited. The first Baptist sermon preached in Texas was preached by Joseph Bays of Missouri as early as 1820. The first Sunday School in Texas was organized by a Baptist, Thomas J. Pilgrim, at San Felipe de Austin in 1829. Mexican authorities forced the Sunday School to disband and hindered the attempts of the earliest Baptist preachers.

The first Baptist church in Texas was organized in Illinois by Elder Daniel Parker. Parker visited Texas in 1832, and concluded that the Mexican laws clearly prohibited organizing a church in Texas. He also decided the immigration of an organized church into the state would not violate the colonization laws. To this end, he and several others constituted a church in Illinois, then traveled to Texas by wagon train, arriving in Austin Colony by January 20, 1834. Parker held a strict predestinarian theology, as well as his controversial Two-Seed theology. Like those travelers, the church was named Pilgrim. This church, and those churches of like faith that followed, remained aloof from the majority of Baptists in Texas. Pilgrim Church is the oldest Baptist church in Texas, and survives today as a Primitive Baptist church near Elkhart, TX.

The first missionary Baptist church in Texas was organized at Washington-on-the-Brazos by Z. N. Morrell in 1837. The following year, Isaac Reed and R. G. Green formed the Union Baptist Church, about 5 miles north of Nacogdoches, Texas. This church, now known as the Old North Church, is the oldest surviving missionary Baptist church in Texas, and cooperates with the Baptist General Convention of Texas. After Texans achieved independence from Mexico, Baptists began to flourish in Texas. Many churches were formed in the days of the Republic of Texas. With the multiplication of churches came also the organization of associations. The first association was the Union Baptist Association, organized in 1840.

As the local associations increased, Missionary Baptists became interested in cooperation together on the broader state level. In 1848 representatives from four associations met at Anderson, Texas, and started the Baptist State Convention of Texas. In 1853, the Baptist General Association of Texas was organized at Larissa in Cherokee County in east Texas. Other bodies were formed to serve their regions (and often due to dissatisfaction with the other bodies), such as the East Texas Baptist Convention (org. 1877 at Overton) and the North Texas Baptist Missionary Convention (org. 1879 at Allen). B. H. Carroll, pastor of First Baptist in Waco, was instrumental in getting the General Association, during its 1883 meeting, to propose that five conventions in Texas consider the expediency of uniting as one body.

The North Texas Convention dissolved, and recommended its churches affiliate with the Baptist State Convention. The East Texas Convention also joined the state convention. In 1886, the Baptist General Association of Texas and the Baptist State Convention of Texas ratified the terms of merger and consolidated into one body called The Baptist General Convention of Texas. In addition to Carroll, other leaders in the merger included S. A. Hayden, J. B. Cranfill, J. B. Link, J. M. Carroll, R. T. Hanks, and G. W. Smith.

Following this short-lived unity, S. A. Hayden was involved in controversy; during the S. A. Hayden controversy of the early 20th century, the Baptist Missionary Association of Texas was founded and split with the Baptist General Convention of Texas. The second major division following the formation of the convention was the Premillennial Missionary Baptist Fellowship's foundation by J. Frank Norris in 1933.

As the Baptist General Convention of Texas grew in spite of these initial divisions, and with its affiliation to the Southern Baptists, by the end of the 20th century, the Baptist General Convention of Texas was involved in a doctrinal struggle regarding the future of the Southern Baptist Convention. During the intense struggle for control of the Southern Baptist Convention's resources and ideological direction between moderates and conservatives, the state convention—being the largest by finances and organization—largely resisted the conservative and at-times fundamentalist course of the Southern Baptist Convention from the 1980s-1990s. Defending individual soul liberty and the autonomy of the local church, by 1998, a number of conservative churches split with the theologically moderate convention to form the Southern Baptists of Texas Convention.

Since this schism and the conservative takeover of the Southern Baptist Convention, the Baptist General Convention of Texas has mobilized affiliated churches at annual meetings to elect moderate or centrist candidates endorsed by the organization in the 1990s and early 2000s. In 1994, it was suggested that the convention completely severed ties with the Southern Baptists.

By 2000, the state convention voted to cut its contributions to Southern Baptist-operated seminaries, and stopped financially contributing to the SBC Christian Life Commission. In 2000, the convention also declined to affirm the Southern Baptist Convention's 2000 Baptist Faith and Message. Following, in 2001, the Baptist General Convention of Texas recommended shifting contributions away from the SBC's North American Mission Board. The Baptist General Convention of Texas has funded and maintained their own home and foreign missions organizations.

Since then, the state body has continued to remain theologically moderate, operating and partnering their theologically moderate or centrist seminaries, colleges and universities, health and financial institutions, and church planting networks separate from the Southern Baptist Convention's entities. The Baptist General Convention of Texas has also primarily affiliated with the Baptist World Alliance, while maintaining nominal affiliation with the Southern Baptist Convention.

In 2009, the convention began to go by the name Texas Baptists to better communicate who they are, after having their name change deferred in 2008.

In 2024, the North American Mission Board announced it would not fund new churches affiliated with the Texas Baptists unless they change their statement of faith. In June 2024, the executive director of the Texas Baptists wrote, "There are those who would like Texas Baptists to adopt a strictly complementarian position like the SBC and the BFM 2000. There are also those who would like Texas Baptists to be officially egalitarian. Yet, we are committed to unity in diversity under the Scriptures and the Lordship of Christ." It was also noted that non-Texan churches sought affiliation with its GC2 movement. Prior to the executive director's statement, the Texas Baptists affirmed a group-study concerning non-Texan churches desiring affiliation without competing against the Southern Baptist Convention or formal schism.

== Doctrine ==
The Texas Baptists are theologically moderate, and the 1963 Baptist Faith and Message has been adopted as a standard statement of faith. Some affiliated churches use the 2000 Baptist Faith and Message, and other statements of faith; however, neither of the two are required for full inclusion with the Texas Baptists. Its GC2 movement's statement of faith has also been approved for use. Overall the Texas Baptists believe in the Holy Trinity and the virgin birth; the Bible as the only document having authority over churches and the conscience of believers; and the priesthood of all believers and missions. The Texas Baptists affirm the local autonomy of Baptist churches, operating in democratic process in contrast to episcopal and presbyterian polity among other Christian denominations.

Affirming congregationalism, however, the Texas Baptists have collectively opposed the exclusion of women's ordination by the Southern Baptist Convention. As of May 2023, approximately half of the state's campus ministers are women, and they have been provided scholarships for ministry preparation in seminaries; the Texas Baptists have also endorsed female military chaplains, though few serve as lead pastors. In May 2023 according to the Texas Baptists executive director—Craig Christina—"conformity over the role of women in the church is neither a test of fellowship nor a condition of cooperation."

Pertaining to marriage and sexuality, the Texas Baptists affirm any sexual relationship outside of marriage are considered "out of harmonious cooperation with the Baptist General Convention of Texas." The Texas Baptists also denounce homosexuality, adultery, incest, and pornography. In 1998, however, it resolved "churches should seek to minister to all persons" and "the love of God embraces all persons and instructs all Christians to share God's love with others." Refusing to denounce same-sex relationships, churches have been expelled for not cooperating with the Texas Baptists. The relationship between the Texas Baptists and Baylor University was also subjected to review for LGBTQ inclusion, as some affiliated members wanted to exert greater control over affiliated institutions regarding LGBTQ policies; by February 27, 2023, the convention and university have decided to remain affiliated with one another.

== Partner ministries ==
The convention has various partners:

=== Seminaries ===
- George W. Truett Theological Seminary

=== Universities ===
- Baptist University of the Américas
- Baylor University
- Dallas Baptist University
- East Texas Baptist University
- Hardin-Simmons University
- Houston Christian University
- Howard Payne University
- University of Mary Hardin-Baylor
- Wayland Baptist University

=== Boarding schools ===
- San Marcos Baptist Academy

=== Human services ===
- BCFS
- Buckner International
- Children at Heart Ministries
- STCH Ministries

=== Medical ===
- Baptist Health Foundation of San Antonio
- Baptist Hospitals of Southeast Texas
- Baylor Scott & White Health
  - Baylor University Medical Center at Dallas
  - Scott & White Medical Center
- Hendrick Health System
- Hillcrest Baptist Medical Center
- Valley Baptist Health System
- BSA Health System (indirect)

=== News ===
- The Baptist Standard

== See also ==
- Christianity in the United States

== Sources ==
- Texas Baptists: A Sesquicentennial History, H. Leon McBeth (1998)
- A History of Texas Baptists, by James Milton Carroll
- Centennial Story of Texas Baptists, L. R. Elliott, editor
- Encyclopedia of Southern Baptists, Norman W. Cox, et al., editors
- Flowers and Fruits from the Wilderness, by Z. N. Morrell
- Missionary Baptists in Texas: 1820-1998, by Oran H. Griffith
- The Blossoming Desert: A Concise History of Texas Baptists, by Robert A. Baker
