= Z. N. Morrell =

American Baptist founder in Texas

Reverend Z.N Morrell
- Born: January 17, 1803; South Carolina
- Died: December 19, 1883 (aged 80); Texas
- Other names: Baptist wild cat Wild cat
- Occupations: Baptist preacher, editor, churches founder, author, journalist
- Organization(s): Baptist State Convention of North Carolina; Union Baptist Association
- Known for: founding Baptist Church in Texas funds Baylor University; Union Baptist Association

Zachariah Nehemiah Morrell, aka Wildcat or Baptist Wildcat, (January 17, 1803 – December 19, 1883) was an American traveling Baptist preacher, journalist, author, missionary, church founder and historian. He was the founder of Baptist Churches in Texas and Baptist doctrine center in 1835 by preaching the first sermon heard in the country.

== Biography ==
Born in South Carolina, when he was 13 his family moved to Tennessee. Morrell didn't have an early education before becoming a Baptist minister at age 18 and preached in Tennessee for more than 13 years. Morrell was with a lung hemorrhages problem which continues have it disturbing him and was advised to move south by his doctor then he left Tennessee in 1835 spending nearly a year in Yalobusha County, Mississippi, forming three churches; he made an exploratory trip to Texas in December 1835 moving his family to settle there in 1836 at Falls of the Brazos and his family later moved to Washington due to Indians political conditions making Morrell having the opportunity and the first Baptist churches in Texas in 1837. At the early new Republic of Texas Morrell fought against the Indians devoted himself to a merchandising business, schools teaching and politics. He joined a military friend Colonel Mathew Caldwell in 1842 at the battle of Salado which led to the capturing of his son Allen Morrell by Mexicans and got imprisoned for two years; he later relied on the generosity of people believes in his ministry making him pursued his interest in seeing SPIRITUAL WILDERNESS OF TEXAS rejoice and blossom.

In 1846 he was a member of the Domestic Mission Board of the Southern Baptist Convention; at the time he traveled from Cameron to Corsicana using horse for more than 300 miles leading to his health strained and marriage. Also being a member of the Texas Baptist Education Society that was created in 1841 he also help to volunteer in funds during the creation of Baylor University in 1847, he later left Honduras to continue his preaching returning to Texas in 1869 due to health issues although he began journalism in 1867 keeping a constant stream of correspondence with editors in Texas Baptist Herald dealing with infant Baptist money management issues.

One among the notable works extended effort to record baptist history in Texas was Flowers and Fruits from the Wilderness, or Forty Six Years in Texas and Two Winters in Honduras in 1872.

== Churches established ==
Morrell has established more than 10 churches in many place, such are;

- First Baptist Church, Huntsville, Texas in 1844
- Baptist church, Washington on the Brazos in 1845
- Baptist church, Little River in Milam County in 1849
- Baptist church, Marlin in 1852

== Other establishments ==
Morrell was also among the founding members of Union Baptist Association in 1840, Colorado Association in 1847, Trinity River Association in 1848, Leon River Association in 1858 and the Waco Association in 1860.

== Personal life ==
Morrell was married to Clearacy Hayes having four children but she died in 1843 later he married Delia Harlan, a widow in 1845 to 1860.

== Bibliography ==
- Zenos N. Morrell, Flowers and Fruits from the Wilderness, Boston: Gould and Lincoln, 1872; rpt. of 3d ed, Irving, Texas; Griffin Graphic Arts, 1966. James Milton Carroll,
- A History of Texas Baptists, Dallas; Baptist Standard, 1923. D.D. Tidwell, Z. N. Morrell, Early Baptist Historian, Southern Baptist Quarterly, January 1968. Samuel Hesler,
- Zachariah Morrell, Southern Baptist Quarterly, October 1971. Steve Sadler, The Life and Ministry of Zachariah N. Morrell, M.A. thesis, Baylor University, 1980. Steve Sadler
- MORRELL. Z N, The Handbook of Texas Online. US/Central 2003.

== Books ==
- Flowers And Fruits From The Wilderness. Z. N. Morrell. Ergodebooks 2009, ISBN 9781418104351
- Flowers And Fruits From The Wilderness; Or Thirty-Six Years In Texas And Two Winters In Honduras. Z. N. Morrell. Ergodebooks 1998, ISBN 9780918954176
