= Southern Baptist Convention of Virginia =

State convention of Southern Baptist church

SBC of Virginia
- Classification: Protestant
- Orientation: Baptist
- Polity: Congregationalist
- Region: Virginia
- Origin: September 16, 1996; Richmond, Virginia
- Separated from: Baptist General Association of Virginia
- Congregations: ~ 850 churches

The Southern Baptist Convention of Virginia (SBCV) is a fellowship of 850 Southern Baptist churches across Virginia and surrounding areas. It is supportive of the national Southern Baptist Convention (SBC).

== History ==
It was formed in 1993 when conservative Virginia Baptists across the state founded the SBCV fellowship. On September 16, 1996, messengers that met at Grove Avenue Baptist Church in Richmond, Virginia, voted for the fellowship to become a new Southern Baptist state convention. On October 1, 1996, the SBC Executive Committee officially acknowledged SBCV as a new state convention.

The SBC of Virginia objectives flow out of the convention's Purpose Statement and Core Values. They set the parameters for what the convention does, hold the convention accountable, and help the convention write goals and action plans. The SBCV strives to start new churches, strengthen existing churches in the state and support pastors, staff, and their families, and mobilize churches with mission opportunities.

== Doctrinal position ==
The SBC of Virginia believes that the Bible is the verbally inspired Word of God and is sufficient as the only infallible rule of faith and practice. The SBCV denies that other books are inspired by God in the same way as the Bible. The SBCV is committed to the Baptist Faith and Message 2000 with the clarification of the Bible being "the inerrant word of God" instead of merely "the verbally inspired Word of God ... sufficient as our only infallible rule of faith and practice" as described above. The doctrinal position of the SBCV is not binding upon any local church; however, the convention recognized its right and responsibility to determine its identity, including doctrinal parameters, and to include within its affiliation those individual affiliates and churches who can freely agree with it, and to exclude those individuals or churches who do not.

== Organization ==
The SBCV is organized to support churches in each of its six ministry regions. Church Enrichment Missionaries and Church Planting Strategists and their families live in Tidewater, Richmond, Greater Washington, Central Virginia, Roanoke Valley, and the Southwestern areas in order to be readily accessible to the pastors and churches. Additionally, the SBCV Executive Director and statewide ministry support staff are located at the organization's headquarters in Glen Allen, Virginia.
