= Florida Baptist Convention =

The Florida Baptist Convention (FBC) is a group of churches affiliated with the Southern Baptist Convention located in the U.S. state of Florida. Headquartered in Jacksonville, Florida, the convention is made up of 49 Baptist associations and around 2,900 churches as of 2010. The FBC is currently led by Dr. Stephen N. Rummage when he was named the Executive Director-Treasurer of the Florida Baptist Convention as of July 18, 2024.

The FBC was formed on November 20, 1854 by a convention of seventeen delegates representing some 55 congregations meeting in Madison, Florida, in the home of R. J. Mays, who was elected president. At the time, there were three associations: Florida, West Florida and Alachua.

== Affiliated organizations ==
- Blue Springs Baptist Conference Center
- Florida Baptist Foundation
- Florida Baptist Children's Homes
- Florida Baptist Credit Union
- Florida Baptist Retirement Centers, Inc
- Florida Baptist Witness - State Baptist Newspaper
- Florida Baptist Historical Society
- Lake Yale Baptist Conference Center
- South Florida Urban Impact Center

== Affiliated education institutions ==
- Baptist University of Florida
- Stetson University (1885-1907, 1919-1995)
- Columbia College, Lake City, Florida, 1907-1919
