= State Convention of Baptists in Ohio =

The State Convention of Baptists in Ohio is a group of churches affiliated with the Southern Baptist Convention located in the U.S. state of Ohio.

The convention is based in Columbus, Ohio; it is made up of around 15 associations as of 2025.

The convention was set up in 1953; by its 70th anniversary, it had 704 churches in its membership.

== Affiliated organizations ==
- Cedarville University
- Ohio Baptist Foundation
- Ohio Baptist Messenger
- Metro-Columbus Bible Institute
- Seneca Lake Baptist Assembly
