= Baptist University of the Américas =

Coordinates: 29.347686°N 98.542128°W

- Type: Private university
- Established: 1947
- Religious affiliation: Baptist General Convention of Texas
- Students: 215
- Undergraduates: 175
- Location: San Antonio, Texas, United States
- Campus: Urban 92 acres
- Mascot: Eagle
- Website: www.bua.edu

The Baptist University of the Américas (BUA) is a private Baptist university in San Antonio, Texas. It was founded in 1947. It was previously known as the Mexican Baptist Training School, the Mexican Baptist Bible Institute, the Hispanic Baptist Theological Seminary and the Hispanic Baptist Theological School. The school is associated with the Baptist General Convention of Texas.

== History ==
In 1947, the school was founded by missionary Paul Siebenmann and named the Mexican Baptist Training School, which was changed to the Mexican Baptist Bible Institute. Initially, churches in the community hosted the school's classes. The school moved into a building at West Martin and North Leona in 1950. A new campus was established on the Pam Am Expressway in 1964.

Initially affiliated with the San Antonio Baptist Association and the Baptist General Convention of Texas, the school entered into a merger with the Southwestern Baptist Theological Seminary in 1982. The merger prompted a name change to the Hispanic Baptist Theological Seminary. In 1989, the relationship between the school and Southwestern seminary was dissolved. The institution fell under the authority of the Baptist General Convention of Texas again. The name was changed again to the Hispanic Baptist Theological School in 1999 to avoid suggesting that the institution was an accredited seminary. The school took its present name in 2003.

== Academics ==
The university is associated with the Baptist General Convention of Texas and accredited by the Association for Biblical Higher Education. The school maintains an articulation agreement with Texas A&M University–Commerce. The university offers Bachelor of Arts degree programs and an Associate of Arts degree program in Cross-Cultural Studies. Rene Maciel was named president of the school in 2007 after working as an assistant dean at George W. Truett Theological Seminary at Baylor University.

BUA operates three institutes for specialized study. The Baptist Bible Institute is a non-degree program that provides "training to leaders, future pastors and church planters in their own geographical location, in their language and at a reasonable cost." The Christian Institute of Islamic Studies prepares Christians to serve Muslims by bringing them the gospel of Jesus. This program offers non-degree training as well as concentrations within the university's biblical studies degree. The Latina Leadership Institute offers trainings and conferences to develop Hispanic Christian female leaders.
