= Council of Colleges of Arts and Sciences =

American association of college and university

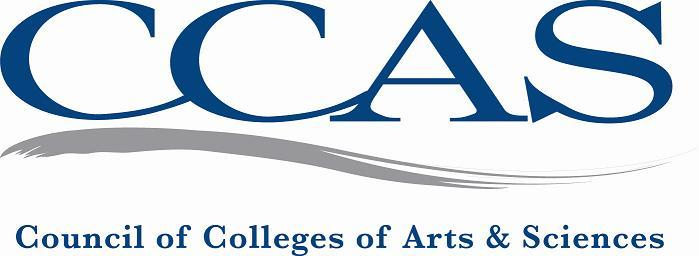
CCAS Logo.

The Council of Colleges of Arts and Sciences (CCAS) is an American association of college and university deans promoting the arts and sciences as leading influences in higher education.

== History ==
CCAS was founded in 1965 after the National Association of State Universities and Land-Grant Colleges (now the Association of Public and Land-grant Universities) voted to include engineering and agricultural deans, but not arts and sciences deans, in their legislative advocacy programs. Arts and sciences deans withdrew and formed a new organization with the mission of providing networking and training opportunities, political advocacy, and a forum for discussion of contemporary challenges in the higher education sector.

In 1968, eligibility was extended to all public Baccalaureate degree-granting colleges of arts and sciences, and to private institutions in 1988. By 2015 there were 517 member institutions with 1,750 deans and associate/assistant deans, representing a diverse range of American four-year colleges and universities, as well as institutions in Canada, Greece, Kazakhstan, Kuwait and Qatar. The member institutions educate approximately four million college and university students in the U.S. CCAS is governed by an elected board of twelve directors representing member institutions, led by a president, past-president, president-elect, and treasurer.

The slogan of CCAS -- "Networking Arts and Sciences Deans"—shapes such activities as an annual meeting, workshops for new deans, active listservs, and seminars held around the country on topics including department chair training, fiscal management, conflict resolution, and the law in higher education. The organization is funded by membership dues and meeting fees. CCAS champions the importance of liberal education and in 2008 initiated an Arts and Sciences Advocacy Award; the first recipient was Phi Beta Kappa.

In 2009 CCAS received a collaborative National Science Foundation grant to address the status of women in the STEM disciplines of science, technology, engineering and mathematics. In 2012, CCAS participated in a national study of non-tenure-track faculty designed to evaluate college deans’ views on the professoriate, their values, and their beliefs pertaining this group of faculty. The survey also examined the pressures influencing deans’ decision making in relation to faculty hiring as well as policies affecting non-tenure-track faculty. Its participation in a 2013 study of its membership generated findings on the "pathway to the deanship" of its members with an emphasis on differences by gender.

CCAS maintains a Deans Knowledge Base containing hundreds of articles and resources for its membership and in 2014 published Deans & Development: Making the Case for Supporting the Liberal Arts & Sciences (C. Strikwerda and A.M. McCartan, eds.).

CCAS is headquartered at the College of William & Mary in Williamsburg, Virginia, where its activities are directed by a full-time executive director.
