= Cedarville University =

Baptist university in Cedarville, Ohio, US

- Former name: Cedarville College (1887–2002)
- Motto: Pro Corona et Foedere Christi
- Motto in English: For the Crown and Covenant of Christ; For the Word of God and the Testimony of Jesus Christ (second motto)
- Type: Private university
- Established: 1887; 139 years ago
- Religious affiliation: Baptist
- Academic affiliations: ACSI, AICUO, AGB, CCAS, CHEA, CIC, HLC, IACE, NAICU, NC-SARA, OFIC, OLC, SOCHE, Space-grant
- Endowment: $60.9 million (2025)
- Chancellor: Paul Dixon
- President: Thomas White
- Academic staff: 249
- Administrative staff: 364
- Students: 6,384
- Undergraduates: 4,024
- Postgraduates: 590
- Other students: 1,770 Dual Enrollment
- Location: 251 N. Main St., Cedarville, Ohio, United States
- Campus: 441 acres (178 ha); Rural
- Colors: (Blue and gold)
- Nickname: Yellow Jackets
- Sporting affiliations: NCAA Division II — G-MAC; NCCAA
- Mascot: Yellow Jacket
- Website: cedarville.edu

Cedarville University is a private university in Cedarville, Ohio, United States. Established in 1887, the school was originally affiliated with the conservative Reformed Presbyterian Church in North America, General Synod. In 1953, the college became affiliated with the General Association of Regular Baptist Churches until 2006. Since 2003, Cedarville is affiliated with the State Convention of Baptists in Ohio (Southern Baptist Convention). It is chartered by the state of Ohio, approved by the Ohio Board of Regents, and accredited by the Higher Learning Commission.

== History ==
=== 1800s and 1900s ===
Cedarville College was chartered in 1887 by the New Light Reformed Presbyterian Church; at the time, the surrounding township was largely Presbyterian. The first classes were held in 1892, though the college did not officially open until 1894. David McKinney was the college's first president.

After McKinney, Wilbert McChesney served as president from 1915 to 1940. McChesney guided the college during World War I and the Depression, and also served as professor of New Testament when the Reformed Presbyterian Seminary was located at Cedarville. In addition to his duties at Cedarville, McChesney served seven terms in the Ohio Legislature.

Walter Smith Kilpatrick replaced McChesney in 1940 and served until 1943. He is the only alumnus of the college (1934) to serve as president, having graduated with honors. Kilpatrick's brief tenure faced financial challenges and the impact of World War II. He was forced to step down when he was convicted of sexual assault of a seven-year-old girl from Toledo in his hotel room, and received an indeterminate sentence in an Ohio penitentiary.

Ira Vayhinger became the college's fourth president in 1943 and served until 1950. He had served as general secretary of the local YMCA from 1911 to 1922. He joined Cedarville College in 1941 as finance director and business manager. As president, he guided the college through enrollment challenges and the difficult years of World War II.

E. H. Miller was appointed president in 1950. During his tenure, in 1953, the college merged with the Baptist Bible Institute of Cleveland. Following the unanimous vote of both boards of trustees, the transfer of property occurred April 4, 1953. Miller's tenure as president ended in 1953.

Leonard Webster, the dean of the Baptist Bible Institute of Cleveland, became president of Cedarville College in 1953. In 1953, the Baptist Bible Institute of Cleveland, Ohio, relocated to Cedarville's campus and transitioned into management of Cedarville College through a merger arrangement with the college's Presbyterian board of trustees, who each resigned in turn. The Baptists were affiliated with the General Association of Regular Baptist Churches. Webster led the move from Cleveland to Cedarville and hired new faculty to complement the existing Baptist Bible Institute professors. Webster represented Cedarville at national and state conferences of the Regular Baptist Churches to promote the college.

James T. Jeremiah, Cedarville College's seventh president, began his tenure in 1954 and served until 1978. Under Jeremiah's leadership, Cedarville College transformed to an accredited institution of higher learning. College enrollment increased to over 1,200 during Jeremiah's tenure by the mid-1970s. The Jeremiah Chapel in the Dixon Ministry Center is named in honor of Jeremiah. David Jeremiah, his son, is a noted alumnus and a former Cedarville trustee.

Paul H. Dixon became the eighth president of Cedarville College in 1978. During the 25 years that Dixon served as president, Cedarville constructed $100 million in facilities and expanded from 180 to 400 acres.

=== 2000s ===
In 2002, it became a university. In 2003, it became affiliated with the State Convention of Baptists in Ohio. Enrollment increased from 1,185 students in 1978 to more than 3,000 by the end of Dixon's service in 2003.

Cedarville's ninth president, William E. Brown, took office in 2003. Under his leadership, the university developed new online programs and launched the Pharm.D., M.S.N., M.B.A., and now-defunct M.Ed. programs. The campus expanded to include the Center for Biblical and Theological Studies and Health Sciences Center and renovated 14 residence halls. Yet, mid-way through his tenure, President Brown experienced controversies regarding the lack of collegiality among Bible professors and the allegiance to the school's doctrinal statement, leading to the terminations of some professors, most notably, David Hoffeditz and Michael Pahl. As a result of ongoing problems, President Brown announced his resignation in October 2012. In January 2013, Inside Higher Ed characterized the university as being in the midst of an "ongoing, tangled doctrinal controversy." Vice President for Student Life Carl Ruby resigned for undisclosed reasons in January 2013. Due to lack of interest, the board of trustees eliminated Cedarville's philosophy major at the end of the academic year.

In 2006, the General Association of Regular Baptist Churches terminated its relationship with the school due to the partnership with the Southern Baptist Convention and perceived liberalism in this convention.

Brown left his position as president in July 2013, instead becoming the university's chancellor, an office he held until July 2014. Thomas White became the 10th president of Cedarville in July 2013. Under White's leadership, the university completed an extensive renovation of the Jeremiah Chapel, built new science laboratories, established two additional graduate programs, and founded the Center for Biblical Apologetics and Public Christianity.

In December 2013, following policy changes made by President White, twenty-year associate professor of Christian education Joy Fagan resigned, saying she felt that she was no longer a good fit for the university. White claimed that his policies were in line with Cedarville's past values and Scripture, and were "not a new shift." In early 2014, White said that university was preparing to codify their complementarian stance concerning gender roles and re-wrote the school's doctrinal statement to reflect the change. According to 100: Cedarville College, A Century of Commitment by J. Murray Murdoch, the first doctrinal statement adopted by then-Cedarville College made no mention of gender roles or complementarian theology.

From 2010 to 2014, an independent student newspaper titled The Ventriloquist was written by students and publicly distributed on campus without authorization. The publication often reported alternative perspectives about the institutional changes and had published LGBT-sympathetic content. In April 2014, President White and Vice President of Student Life Jon Wood confiscated copies of the newspaper as students waited outside the chapel to distribute it. According to The Ventriloquist, White stated that permission was required to distribute the newspaper. After this incident, The Ventriloquist was moved online, where new articles continued to be published for about a year.

In the spring of 2017, White and then-Academic Vice President Loren Reno instituted what they called the "Philippians 4:8 Policy", which they claimed provided biblically consistent guidelines for faculty to follow but which some professors claimed amounted to censorship and the loss of academic freedom. They later changed the policy title to the "Biblically Consistent Curriculum (BCC) Policy," after two veteran Bible professors objected to this interpretation and application of Philippians 4:8. The policy is still in place today, serving to regulate the literature, art, films, and other media that faculty are permitted to use in the classroom.

The university's seal has remained essentially unchanged from the Presbyterians' original design and still contains the Latin phrase "Pro Corona et Foedere Christi", which is translated, "For the crown and covenant of Christ". The original seal is surrounded with a slogan adopted by the former Baptist Bible Institute, "For the Word of God and the Testimony of Jesus Christ".

=== Controversies under President White ===
Thomas White took office as president in July 2013, becoming the 10th president of Cedarville University. Under White's leadership, the university has completed an extensive renovation of the Jeremiah Chapel, built new science laboratories, established two additional graduate programs, and founded the Center for Biblical Apologetics and Public Christianity. President White has also been embroiled in controversies. In December 2013, twenty-year Cedarville professor Joy Fagan resigned, saying she did not fit the changing policies, including the new restriction of only female students allowed in the Bible classes taught by female professors. White claimed that his policies were in line with past values and Scripture, and were "not a new shift", although many alumni remember Jean Fisher, associate professor of Christian education, who taught male and female students in the department under President Dixon. In early 2014, White said that university was preparing to codify their complementarian stance concerning gender roles and re-wrote the school's doctrinal statement to reflect that change. Although egalitarian faculty existed, some felt they were no longer welcome. According to 100: Cedarville College, A Century of Commitment by J. Murray Murdoch, Ph.D., the first doctrinal statement adopted by then-Cedarville College made no mention of gender roles or complementarian theology. White also said he was eliminating layers of leadership so that the presidential cabinet would have direct authority over the university.

In April 2014, President White and Vice President of Student Life Jon Wood confiscacted copies of The Ventriloquist, an independent student newspaper, during its unauthorized public distribution; the publication had previously reported alternative perspectives about the institutional changes and published LGBT-sympathetic content. Per the Ventriloquist website, the paper recognized that they were outside the university life and chose to publish online. Similarly, in the spring of 2017, immediately after the university earned reaccreditation from the Higher Learning Commission, White and then-Academic Vice President Loren Reno instituted what they called the "Philippians 4:8 Policy", which they claimed provided biblically consistent guidelines for faculty to follow but which some professors claimed amounted to censorship and the loss of academic freedom. They later changed the policy title to the "Biblically Consistent Curriculum (BCC) Policy," after two veteran Bible professors objected to this interpretation and application of Philippians 4:8. The policy still exists today and tightly regulates the literature, art, films, media, etc. faculty are permitted to use in the classroom.

Cedarville has also made national news for its handling of alleged sexual assaults. In 2013, the U.S. Department of Education's Office for Civil Rights opened an investigation into how allegations of sexual assaults are handled on campus. In 2018, the chair of the university's board of trustees and White's mentor, Paige Patterson, was fired from his position at Southwestern Baptist Theological Seminary (SWBTS) for covering up a sexual assault; he subsequently resigned from the board. In July 2020, The Roys Report alleged that Thomas White and his wife, Joy White, aided in this cover-up during their time at the SWBTS.

In recent years, students have also alleged that faculty and staff have failed to provide a safe environment for students, discouraged them from seeking help while experiencing suicidal ideation, and threatened retaliatory lawsuits against students for submitting Title IX complaints.

On May 1, 2020, Cedarville's board of trustees placed President White on administrative leave. The board stated that it had learned additional details regarding White's hiring and subsequent firing of an admitted sexual abuser. Lieutenant General (Ret.) Loren Reno was appointed acting president. While White claimed he did not know the extent of Anthony Moore's predation, the Village Church of Fort Worth claims to have provided him with a complete testimony at the time of Moore's hiring. In June, the board reinstated White, leading to the resignation of Mark Vroegop and Danny Akin.

Citing these controversies and high staff turnover, the Higher Learning Commission is conducting an assurance review into Cedarville University's accreditation status in 2020.

== National recognition ==
The Wall Street Journal recognized Cedarville as one of the top three evangelical Christian universities in the United States.

== Academics ==
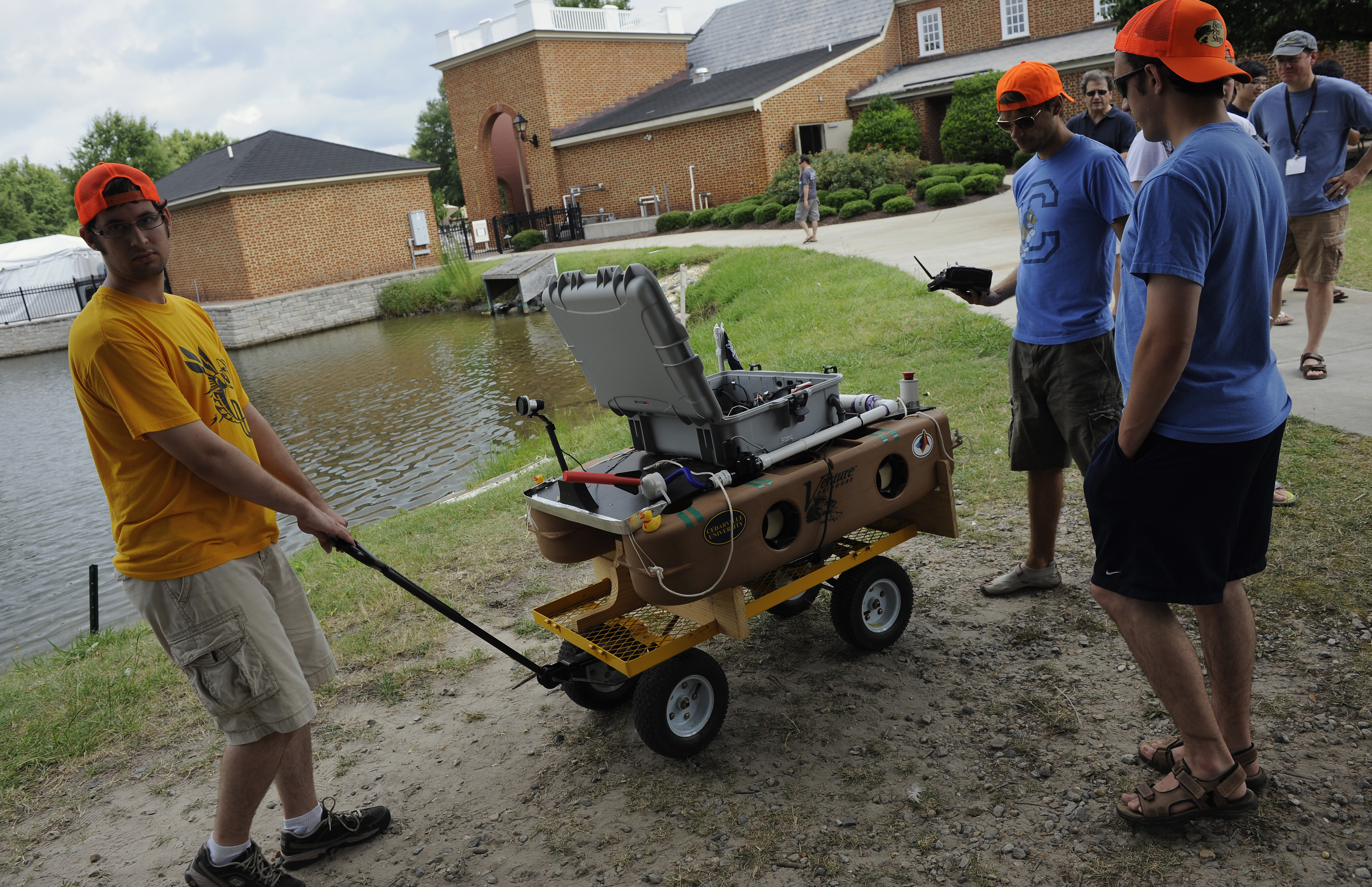
A team from Cedarville University preparing to launch an autonomous surface boat in 2013 as part of a competition off campus.

Cedarville University offers more than 150 programs of study, which cover most areas of the liberal arts, the sciences, professional programs, and theological studies. It also offers over 50 minors, including a five-class Bible minor, which all students are required to take. The university awards graduate degrees in the areas of nursing (M.S.N.), business (M.B.A.), ministry (M.Min. and M.Div.) and pharmacy (Pharm.D.). Cedarville is accredited by the Higher Learning Commission.

In 2004, Cedarville University's Department of Art, Design, and Theatre began a collaboration with the International Center for Creativity (ICC) to develop the Bachelor of Arts in Industrial and Innovative Design. Students complete their first two years of coursework on Cedarville's main campus before attending the university's Innovation Campus in Dublin, Ohio, for their junior and senior years. Following a state review process, the program was authorized by the Chancellor of the Ohio Board of Regents in September 2010. The curriculum includes industry-sponsored design projects.

The university launched a School of Pharmacy in 2009 with 52 students beginning a three-year pre-pharmacy curriculum, and the four-year professional graduate program (Doctor of Pharmacy) launched in 2012. The program is accredited by the Accreditation Council for Pharmacy Education. The Doctor of Pharmacy degree is the university's only doctoral degree and provides patient care services and student education through Cedar Care Pharmacy and the Center for Pharmacy Innovation.

In 2022, Cedarville changed the name of the School of Business Administration, to the Robert W. Plaster School of Business (PSB). As a consequence of a donation from the Robert Plaster Foundation and other donations from individuals, the newly branded PSB is housed in the business building next to the Stevens Student Center.

In 2024, the first cohort of physician assistant students commenced their clinical rotations, marking a significant step in the university's commitment to healthcare education.

The university website reported record-breaking enrollment in 2024 of 6,384 students, including 1,176 freshmen, 590 graduate students, and 1,770 dual-enrolled students.

The university employs more than 200 faculty in several academic departments and the schools of engineering, education, business, pharmacy, nursing, and biblical and theological studies. Academic faculty are required to commit to "biblical integration in and out of the classroom" and must be born-again Christians.

== Spiritual life ==
Dixon Ministry Center

According to its mission statement, the university is "a Christ-centered learning community equipping students for lifelong leadership and service through an education marked by excellence and grounded in biblical truth." All students are required to earn a 15 credit hour Bible minor and attend weekday chapel services on-campus in the Dixon Ministry Center. Students are also encouraged to participate in various community service and ministry programs off campus.

Discipleship groups (D-groups) also feature a prominent role on campus. The purpose of d-groups is to facilitate a more accountable form of small-group ministry. A discipleship group of the same gender meets once a week to go through a book of the Bible or Christian book. After a year of being in a d-group, individuals can apply to be a d-group leader.

== Campus ==
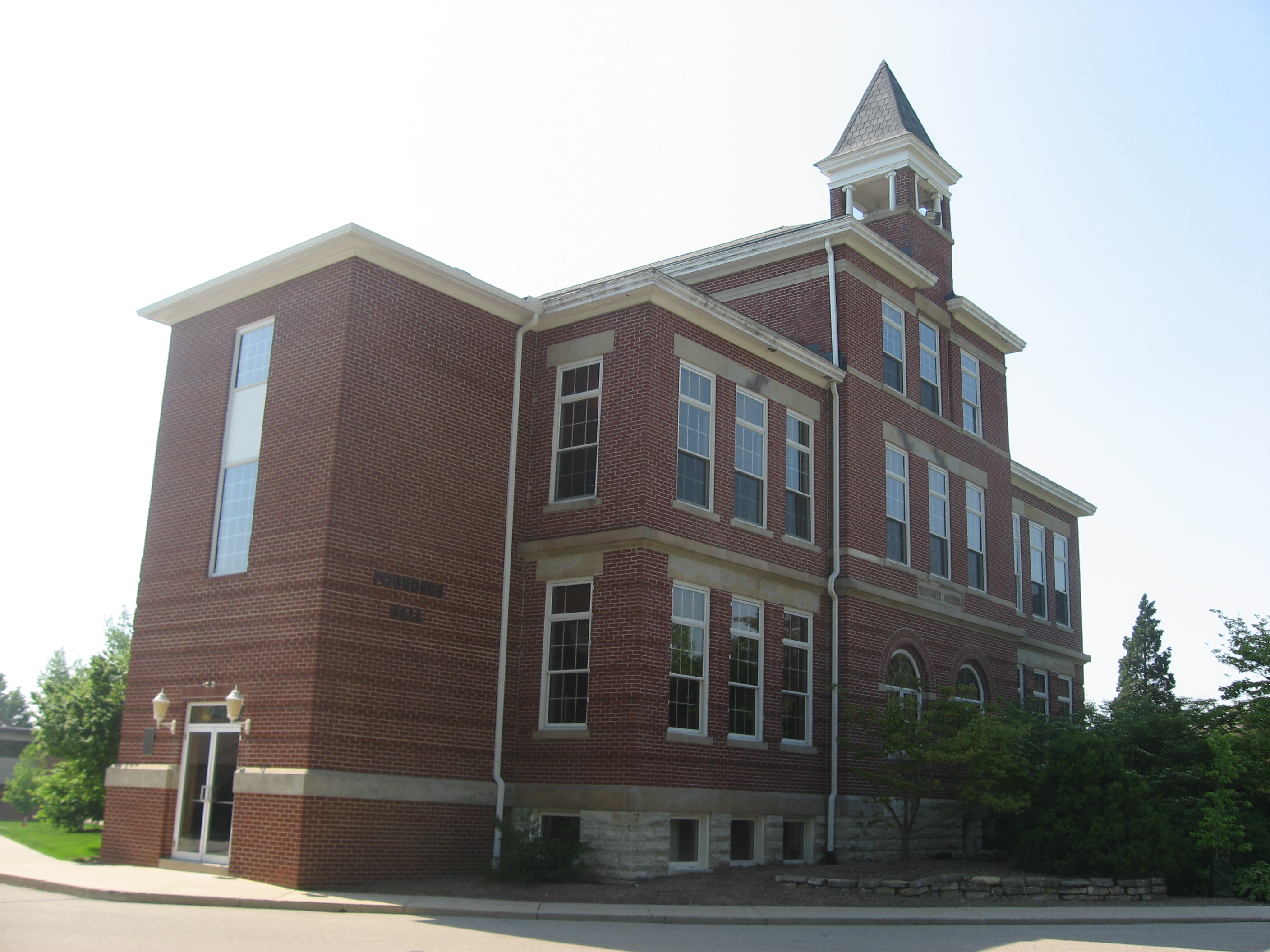
Founders Hall

The university's original campus and facilities are located in the village of Cedarville. Since about 1970, the school has purchased and consolidated surrounding farmlands which now total approximately 400 acres to the north and west of the village. Among the few turn-of-the-century structures is Founders Hall (Old Main), which houses the president's office and administrative functions.

Students are strongly encouraged to live on-campus, and about 80% do so. Those who choose to reside on campus live in single-sex residence halls. The university has eleven residence buildings for men and eleven for women, all with co-ed lounges. Some halls group rooms in a suite-like setting, with three to four bedrooms sharing a small lounge in each unit, while others have a single-room, hall-style format with communal lounges on each floor. Townhouses are available for upper class and graduate students.

Newer athletic facilities cover the farthest northwestern reaches of campus, including a soccer stadium and baseball/softball fields. The university created the Elvin R. King Cross Country Course in 2006, located on the north end of campus and designed to host NCAA-sanctioned, as well as All-Ohio and National Christian College Athletic Association meets.

=== Water tower ===
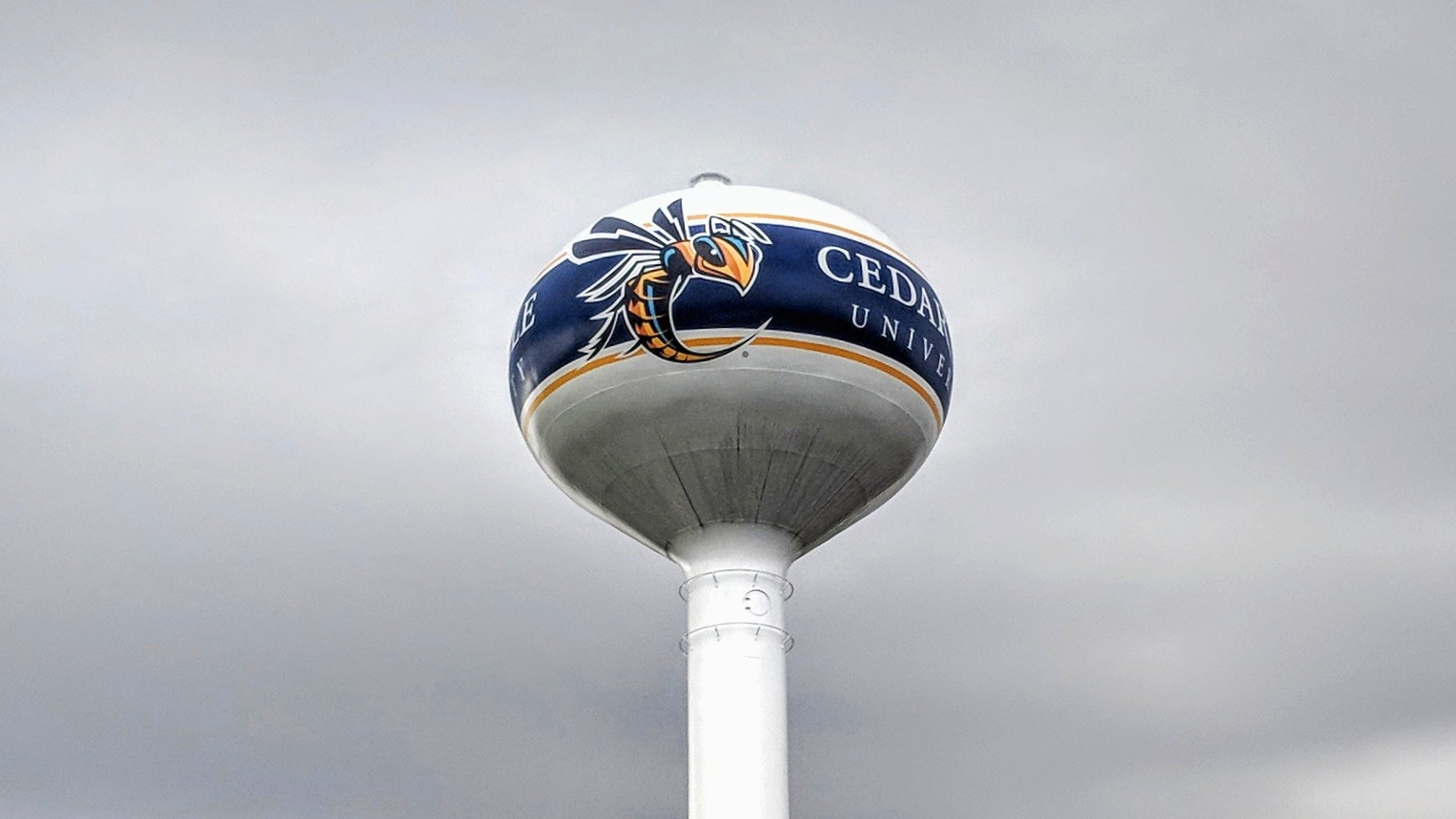

The water tower of Cedarville University is a landmark on the university campus in Cedarville, Ohio. First erected in 1983, the water tower underwent a $55,000 renovation in 2015. The water tower is located behind Cedarville's athletic center and bears the school's mascot, a yellow jacket named Stinger, along with the university's stylized text logo. The aesthetic elements were added in the 2015 renovation by H_{2}O Towers of Saline, Michigan. The job was completed in four days using high-gloss paint manufactured by Tnemec. The water tower can be seen over Cedarville University by southbound drivers on Ohio 72. The tower serves as a landmark for one of the university's emergency telephones.

== Controversies ==
Cedarville has been criticized at a national level for its handling of alleged sexual assaults. In 2013, a student filed an anonymous federal complaint against the university for allegedly violating Title IX and mishandling her report of attempted rape. Following this complaint, the U.S. Department of Education's Office for Civil Rights opened an investigation into how Cedarville handled allegations of sexual assaults. In 2018, the chair of the university's board of trustees and White's mentor, Paige Patterson, was fired from his position at Southwestern Baptist Theological Seminary (SWBTS) for covering up a sexual assault there; he subsequently resigned from the board. The Roys Report alleged that Thomas White and his wife, Joy, aided in this cover-up during their time at the SWBTS, although White responded that he had never met the victim, and neither he nor his wife had heard of the rape.

Students have also alleged through The Roys Report that faculty and staff have failed to provide a safe environment for students, discouraged them from seeking help while experiencing suicidal ideation, and threatened retaliatory lawsuits against students for submitting Title IX complaints. On May 1, 2020, Cedarville's board of trustees placed President White on administrative leave, stating that it had learned additional details regarding White's hiring and subsequent firing of Anthony Moore, an admitted sexual abuser. Lieutenant General (Ret.) Loren Reno was appointed acting president. While White claimed he did not know the extent of Moore's abuse, the Village Church of Fort Worth claimed to have provided him with a complete testimony at the time of Moore's hiring. In June 2020, the board reinstated White, leading to the resignation of two board members, Mark Vroegop and Danny Akin.

== Publications ==
=== BBI publications ===
Before Baptist Bible Institute merged with Cedarville College and relocated from Cleveland, Ohio, they published Marturion (a student yearbook), and B. B. Eye, the only known archives of which are in the Cedarville University library and in the Louisiana Serials list.

=== Current Cedarville publications ===
- Cedars: news magazine and online news site by students for students (subject to the BBC policy)
- Cedarville Magazine: a publication for alumni and supporters of the university. Stories focus on the university's academics, campus life, ministries, and alumni.
- The Cedarville Review: The undergraduate literary journal (subject to the BBC policy)

== Athletics ==
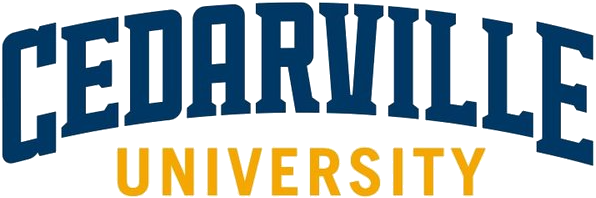
Cedarville athletics wordmark

Cedarville competes in 16 sports. The official school colors are blue and gold. Cedarville is a dual member of two national athletics associations; the university is an NCAA Division II member as well as a member of the National Christian College Athletic Association (NCCAA). The university became a full member of NCAA Division II on July 12, 2012. In 2013 the university joined five other regional institutions to form the Great Midwest Athletic Conference.

== Accreditation and involvement ==
Cedarville University is accredited by the Higher Learning Commission (HLC). Its professional degrees are accredited by the appropriate specialized accreditor. Cedarville University is also approved by the Ohio Department of Higher Education.

In addition, Cedarville is a member of the following organizations:

- Association of Independent Colleges and Universities of Ohio
- Council of Colleges of Arts and Sciences
- Council of Independent Colleges
- National Association of Independent Colleges and Universities
- Ohio College Association
- Ohio Foundation of Independent Colleges
- Strategic Ohio Council for Higher Education
- National Association of Schools of Music
- NSA National Center of Academic Excellence in Cyber Operations

== Student organizations ==
Cedarville University offers nearly 120 different student organizations, from academic and professional, to social and service, to cross-cultural and special interest groups. The university is also home to Resound Radio, an internet radio station run through the school's communication department.

== Alumni ==
- Easton Bazzoli, college basketball coach
- Abbie Cobb, actress and author
- Jenna Ellis, lawyer and co-conspirator with former president Donald Trump in 2020 election fraud case; indicted in 2023.
- Paula Faris, American television correspondent for ABC News
- Valde Garcia, member of the Michigan State Senate
- David Jeremiah, author, speaker and senior pastor of the California evangelical megachurch Shadow Mountain Community Church, and founder of Turning Point Radio and Television Ministries.
- Mark Keough, Republican member of the Texas House of Representatives; pastor in The Woodlands
- Peter A. Lillback, president of Westminster Theological Seminary and author of "George Washington's Sacred Fire"
- Jennifer Matthews, CIA officer killed in Camp Chapman attack
- Grace Norman, two-time U.S. Paralympic triathlon gold medalist, and bronze medalist in 400m in the 2016 Paralympics in Rio
- Jared Osborn, American-Canadian Anglican bishop
- Georgia Purdom, Molecular geneticist and speaker for Answers in Genesis
- Sergio Reyes, elite marathon runner
- DeMaurice Smith, executive director of the National Football League Players Association
- Joseph M. Stowell III, president of Cornerstone University and the author of over 20 Christian books
