= George W. Truett Theological Seminary =

School in Waco, Texas, United States at Baylor University

Coordinates: 31.5506°N 97.1198°W

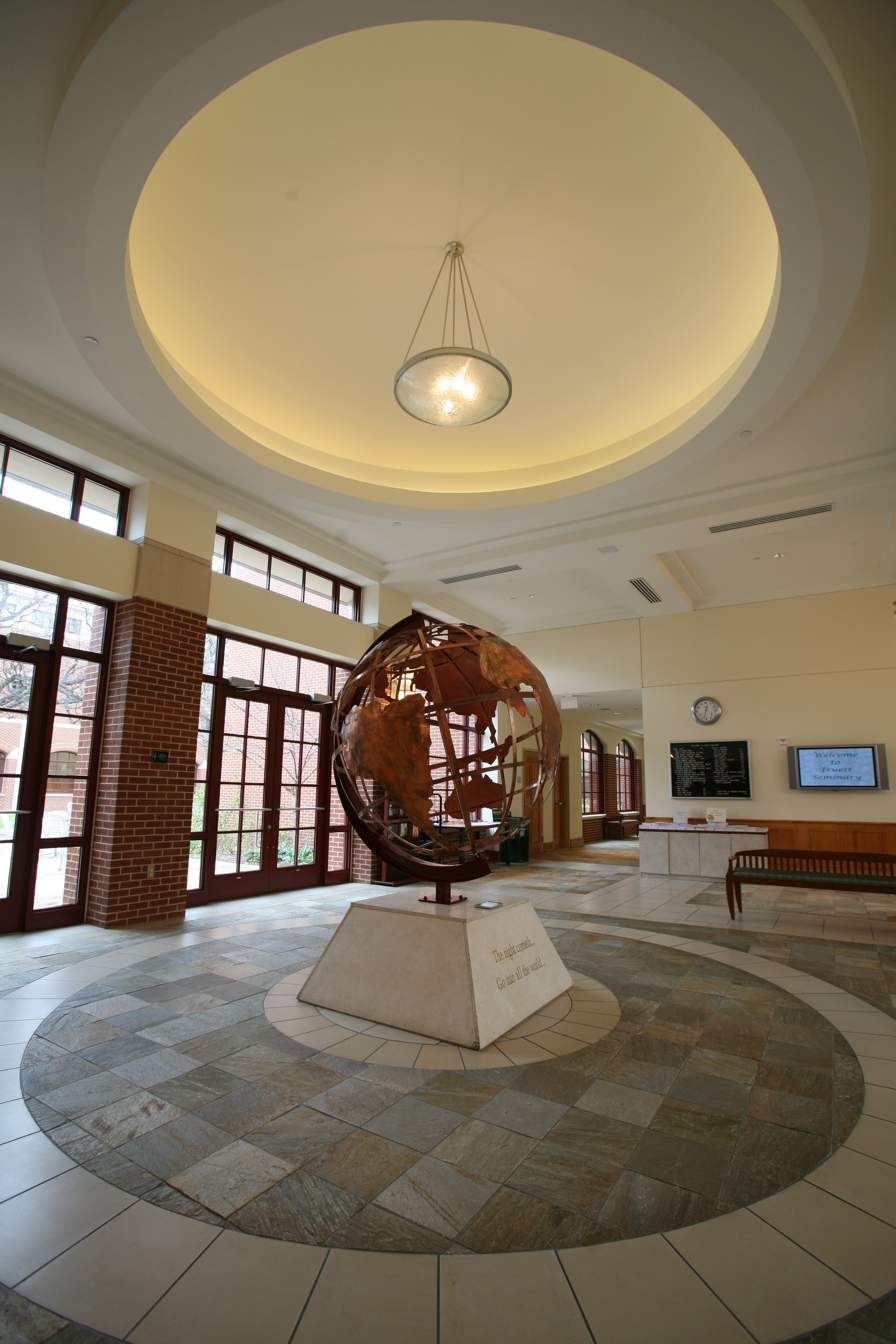
Truett Seminary Narthex

George W. Truett Theological Seminary is a Baptist theological seminary in Waco, Texas. The seminary, named after Southern Baptist preacher George Washington Truett, was founded in 1993 as part of Baylor University and is affiliated with the Baptist General Convention of Texas.

== History ==
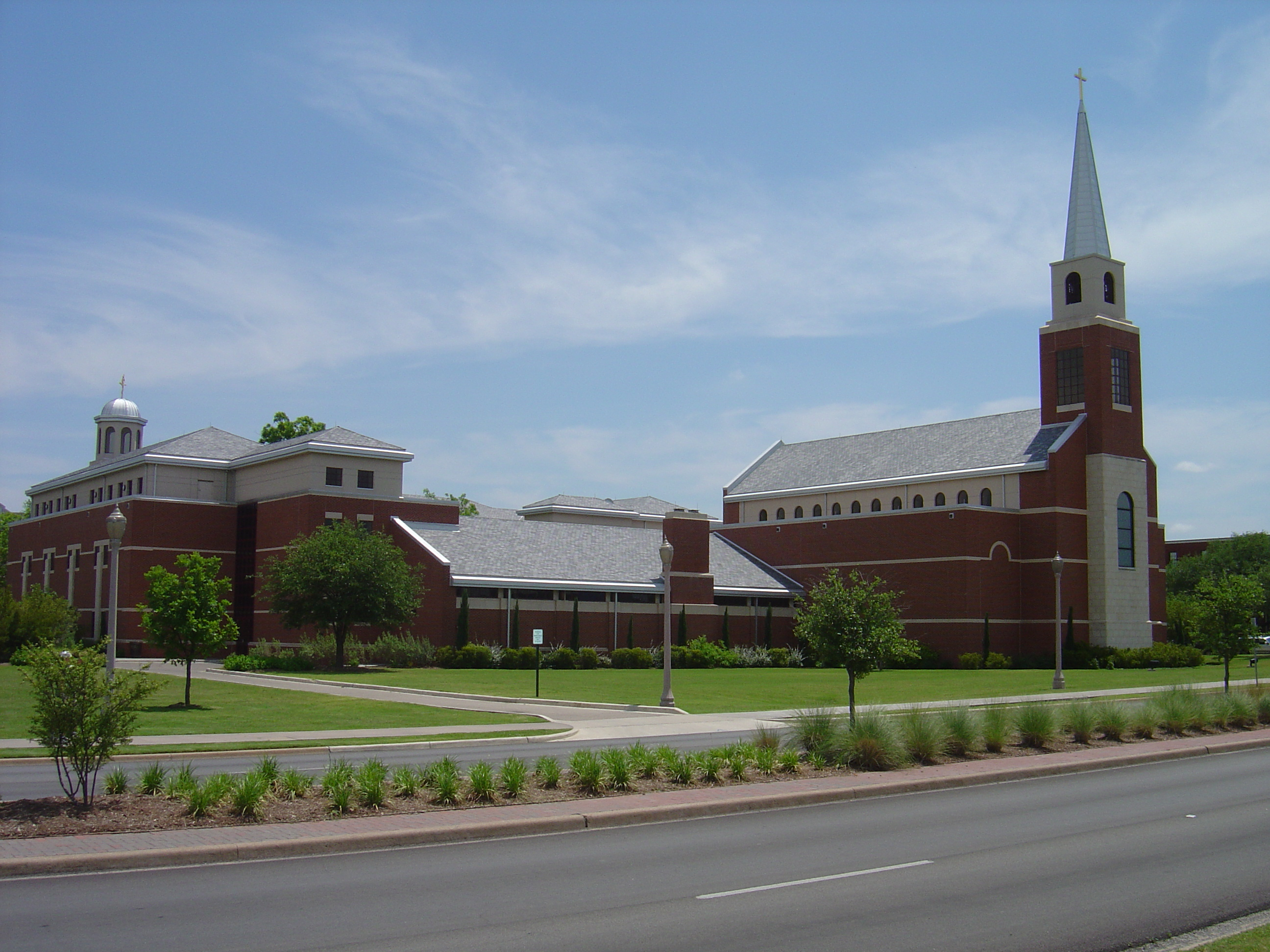
Main entrance at Truett Seminary

On July 24, 1990, Baylor President Herbert H. Reynolds officially reserved with the Secretary of State of Texas the name "George W. Truett Theological Seminary", in case the board decided in the future to create a seminary. On March 2, 1991, the George W. Truett Theological Seminary was chartered and a fifteen-member board of trustees was named by the university's board of regents to investigate the feasibility of operating a seminary.

An organizational meeting of seminary trustees was held on July 18, 1991, at which time officers were elected and a statement of purpose was developed. A joint meeting with the seminary trustees and board of regents was held on January 17, 1992, and further investigation and discussion was authorized. On May 21, 1993, the board of regents approved the opening of George W. Truett Theological Seminary at the beginning of the 1994–95 academic year. In 1994 conservative leaders were in control of the Southern Baptist Convention. Seminary faculty at Southwestern Baptist Theological Seminary and other Southern Baptist Convention seminaries were being required to sign documents indicating agreement with scriptural inerrancy. The board of regents and trustees were able to avoid this requirement at Truett. Truett Seminary was and is more accepting of moderate theology.

At the May 21, 1993, meeting the regents voted to accept the offer of First Baptist Church, Waco, to house the seminary on the second floor of the church's B.H. Carroll Education Building for the first years of its operation. Space was designated for the exclusive use of Truett Seminary for administrative and faculty offices. Classrooms and other areas were specified for the joint use of the seminary and the church. Reminiscent of earlier years of theological education at Baylor, when classes for ministers were held by Rev. Benajah Harvey Carroll (B.H. Carroll), then pastor of First Baptist Church, in his study, Truett Seminary opened offices in the Carroll Education Building on August 1, 1993. Faculty offices were added in July 1994.

The opening convocation service was held on August 28, 1994, with 51 students registered. The Truett Seminary inaugural class graduated from Baylor University in May 1997.

Construction of the seminary on Baylor University's campus began in late 2001. It is located in the northwestern corner of Baylor's main Waco campus, seconds from Interstate 35. The building features three stories of classrooms, a courtyard, and the Paul Powell chapel. Classes began in the John Baugh campus of George W. Truett Seminary in January 2002. Starting in May 2006, the seminary started their own graduation ceremonies, rather than participating in larger general Baylor University graduation ceremonies.

== Notable people ==
- Robert B. Sloan, first dean (1994-1995)
- J. Bradley Creed, second dean (1996-2000)
- Paul Powell, third dean (2001-2007)
- David E. Garland, fourth dean (2007-2015)
- Todd D. Still, fifth dean (2015-present)
- Roger E. Olson, professor of theology and Foy Valentine Professor of Christian Theology and Ethics
- Jimmy Dorrell, executive director of Mission Waco, pastor of Church Under the Bridge, and adjunct professor at Truett Seminary
- Kyle Lake (M.Div. 1997), Baptist pastor of University Baptist Church in Waco, Texas
