= Baptist University of Florida =

Private baptist school

Coordinates: 30.963°N 85.504°W

- Former names: Florida Baptist Institute, Baptist Bible Institute, Florida Baptist Theological College, The Baptist College of Florida
- Motto: Changing the World Through the Unchanging Word®
- Type: Private university
- Established: 1943
- Accreditation: SACS
- Religious affiliation: Florida Baptist Convention (Southern Baptist Convention)
- President: Clayton Cloer
- Students: 846 (spring 2025)
- Location: Graceville, Florida
- Campus: Rural
- Colors: Navy and gold
- Nickname: Eagles
- Sporting affiliations: NCCAA
- Website: www.buf.edu

The Baptist University of Florida is a private Baptist college in Graceville, Florida. It is affiliated with the Florida Baptist Convention (Southern Baptist Convention).

== History ==
The Baptist University of Florida was founded in 1943 and is a cooperating ministry of the Florida Baptist Convention. The school first opened its doors in Lakeland, Florida as the Florida Baptist Institute. Two years later, in 1945, it was renamed as the Baptist Bible Institute. The school moved to its present location in Graceville, Florida in 1953. In 1988, the school was renamed as the Florida Baptist Theological College and in 2000 it was renamed The Baptist College of Florida. Finally, in November 2023 it took on its current name as the Baptist University of Florida, in which the university completed a comprehensive rebranding that introduced a new logo, color scheme, and visual identity.

== Academics ==
The university offers degrees at the associate, bachelor's, master's, and doctoral levels. Areas of academic strength include ministry studies, business, psychology, and education. Programs are offered in both on-campus and online formats. The university was originally focused on training Baptist ministers but now offers a degrees in many subjects.

The university is accredited by the Southern Association of Colleges and Schools. It is affiliated with the Florida Baptist Convention.

== Campus ==
BUF is located on a rural campus in Graceville, Florida. The campus includes the R.G. Lee Chapel, a library, dining facilities, several dormitories, a gymnasium, a weight room, a student center, and multiple classroom and administrative buildings.

From 2023 to 2025, the university established different satellite campuses in Orlando, Jacksonville, Broward County, Miami, and West Palm Beach, along with offering different degree programs in Spanish, French, and Portuguese amongst the new satellite campuses.

== Student life ==
Student life at BUF includes involvement in spiritual life and service. The Baptist Collegiate Ministry (BCM) organizes discipleship groups, worship events, and local outreach activities. BUF also offers intramural sports and organizes mission trips through a program called BUF GO, which sends students on domestic and international service opportunities throughout the year. WFBU-LP is the college radio station.

== Athletics ==
Baptist University of Florida competes in men's basketball, baseball, cross country, women's volleyball, softball, and women's cross country. The university is a member of the NCCAA Southeast Division II. As of 2025, the university plans to expand its athletics program with a full competitive season launch.

In Fall 2025, the institution will begin their first academic year competing in athletics sports. Its teams will be competing in the National Christian College Athletic Association (NCCAA) Southeast Region, Division II. The college has five sports teams that include basketball, baseball, softball, women's volleyball, and cross country.

== See also ==
- List of Baptist colleges and universities in the United States

== Notable alumni ==
- Mark Hall, lead singer of the Christian band Casting Crowns
