= Bluefield University =

Baptist university in Bluefield, Virginia, US

Coordinates: 37°14′22.1″N 81°15′7.2″W

- Former name: Bluefield College (1922–2021)
- Motto: Deus, Patria, Lux
- Motto in English: God, Country, Light
- Type: Private university
- Established: 1922; 104 years ago
- Religious affiliation: Baptist (Baptist General Association of Virginia)
- President: Steven Peterson
- Students: 1,332
- Undergraduates: 851
- Postgraduates: 481
- Location: Bluefield, Virginia, United States
- Campus: 82 acres (33 ha)
- Colors: Blue & Red
- Nickname: Rams
- Sporting affiliations: NAIA – Appalachian
- Mascot: Victor E. Ram
- Website: bluefield.edu
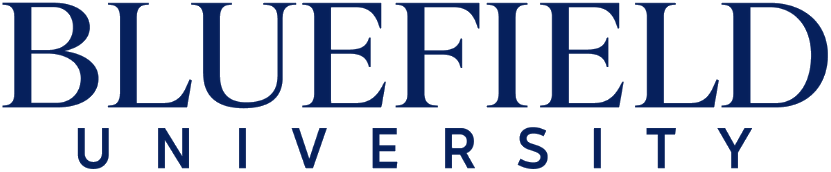

Bluefield University is a private Baptist university in Bluefield, Virginia. It offers 58 academic programs and is accredited by the Southern Association of Colleges and Schools. The 82-acre (330,000 m^{2}) campus is about 150 ft (46 m) from the state line between Virginia and West Virginia. It is affiliated with the Baptist General Association of Virginia. Bluefield University merged with Edward Via College of Osteopathic Medicine which is on the campus of Virginia Tech in Blacksburg, Virginia.

== History ==
Bluefield University was founded as "Bluefield College" in 1922 by the Baptist General Association of Virginia (BGAV), after residents of Bluefield offered to donate land and start-up funds. R.A. Landsdell became the first president in 1920, and the current administration building is named Landsdell Hall in his honor. At its founding, Bluefield was a two-year junior college. Future Nobel Prize winner John F. Nash took mathematics courses at the relatively new college while in high school. In his autobiography for the Nobel Foundation, he writes

I should mention that during my last year in the Bluefield schools that my parents had arranged for me to take supplementary math courses at Bluefield College, which was then a 2-year institution operated by Southern Baptists. I didn't get official advanced standing at Carnegie because of my extra studies but I had advanced knowledge and ability and didn't need to learn much from the first math courses at Carnegie.

Under Charles L. Harman, president from 1946 to 1971, the college built Easley Library, the dormitory Rish Hall, Harman Chapel, and a geodesic dome as the gymnasium.

In 1975, Bluefield reinvented itself as a four-year college, and during the 1989–1996 presidency of Roy A. Dobyns, student enrollment doubled to more than 800 students. In 1998, under the leadership of President Daniel G. MacMillan, the college cut tuition by over 20% and refocused its student recruitment on the local area.

In 2007 David W. Olive, was inaugurated as president. Shortly thereafter, the college raised tuition by about 20%, and announced a new strategic plan.

During the centennial anniversary of Bluefield College, it achieved university status and became Bluefield University upon announcement from President David Olive at the President's Convocation on August 18, 2021.

On July 19, 2024, the university announced the appointment of Dr. Steven Peterson as its 10th president.

=== Presidents ===
Presidents of Bluefield University have included:

Bluefield University presidents
| R. A. Lansdell | 1920–1926 |
| Oscar E. Sams | 1927–1930 |
| J. Taylor Stinson | 1930–1934 |
| Edwin C. Wade | 1934–1946 |
| Charles L. Harman | 1946–1971 |
| Charles L. Tyer | 1972–1988 |
| Roy A. Dobyns | 1989–1996 |
| Daniel G. MacMillan | 1997–2006 |
| David W. Olive | 2007–2023 |
| Steven Peterson | 2024–Present |

== Campus ==
Bluefield University's campus is located on 82 acres on the eastern edge of Bluefield, Virginia, facing the northern side of the East River Mountain.

=== Academic and administrative buildings ===
- Lansdell Hall – Opening in 1922, building holds the college's primary administrative offices and classrooms.
- Easley Library – The three-story building features the campus library on the upper two floors, while the first floor houses the education department and classrooms.
- Harman Chapel – The spire of the chapel is featured in the college's logo. The building houses the music and theater departments and serves as a host for events including convocations, graduations, concerts, plays, and services.
- Science Center – The building holds offices, classrooms, science labs, and technology labs.
- Cox Visual Arts Center – Located on the southwestern corner of campus, the building holds classrooms, offices, and workspace for the art department.
- Alumni Advancement Building

=== Residential buildings ===
- Cruise Hall – Constructed with the opening of the college in 1922, the building now serves as a male dormitory.
- Rish Hall – The first floor contains classrooms and houses the English department, communication department, and the Academic Center for Excellence (ACE). The upper three floors serve as a male dormitory.
- East River Hall – Female dormitory
- Alumni Hall – Male dormitory
- Bluestone Commons – Constructed in 2014, the buildings hold male and female apartment-style student housing.

=== Student life facilities ===
- Shott Hall – Holds the Student Activities Center, main dining hall, Quick Shott Cafe, campus bookstore, and student mailboxes.
- Dan MacMillan Center – Opening in 2007, the building is the focal point for the college's outreach and service projects.

The campus also features access to outdoor activities, including an on-campus nature trail.

== Organization ==
Bluefield University is organized into the following colleges:

- Caudill School of Business
- College of Arts and Letters
- College of Science & Health Sciences
- School of Criminal Justice
- School of Education & Social Sciences
- School of Nursing

== Academics ==
Bluefield University offers undergraduate and graduate study in campus-based and online formats, including an online division, Bluefield University Online, through which selected programs can be completed fully online.

== Athletics ==
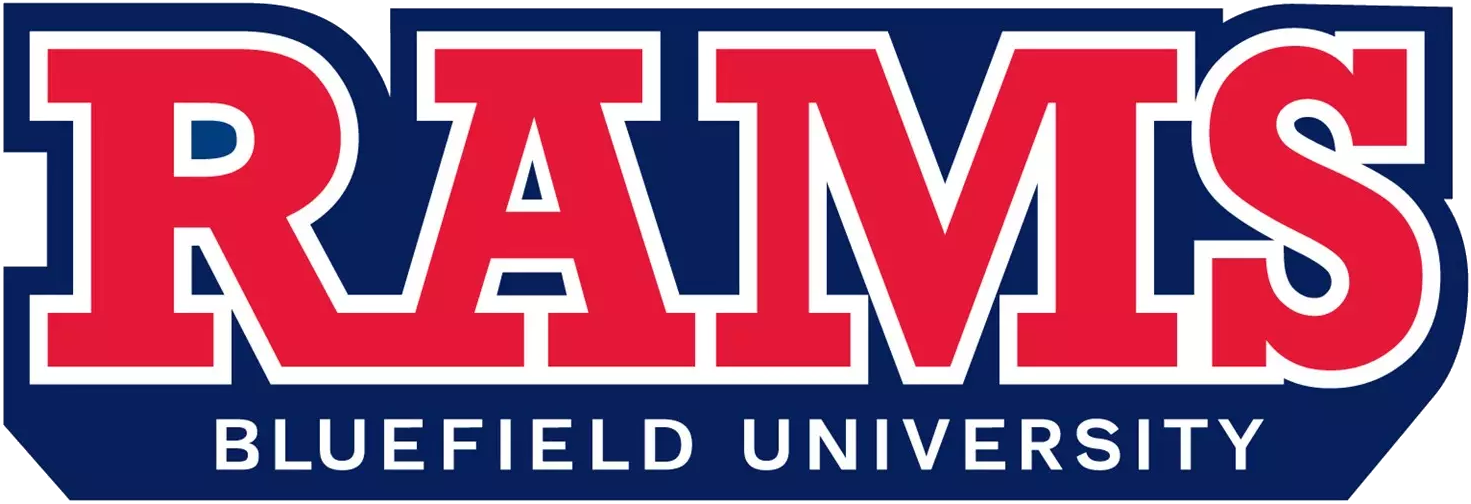
Bluefield athletics wordmark

The Bluefield athletic teams are called the Rams. The university is a member of the National Association of Intercollegiate Athletics (NAIA), primarily competing in the Appalachian Athletic Conference (AAC) for most of their sports since the 2014–15 academic year (of which they were a member on a previous stint from 2001–02 to 2011–12); Its football team has competed in the Mid-South Conference (MSC) since the 2014 fall season. They were also a member of the National Christian College Athletic Association (NCCAA), primarily competing as an independent in the Mid-East Region of the Division I level until after the 2019–20 school year to fully align with the NAIA. The Rams previously competed in the Mid-South as a full member from 2012–13 to 2013–14. Athletes make up about 60% of the student population at Bluefield. It served as host for the NCCAA Softball National Championship.

== Notable alumni ==
- Jon Link – Major League Baseball player
- Kenneth Massey – sports statistician known for his development of the Massey Ratings, which stemmed from an honors project at Bluefield, and was used in the Bowl Championship Series computer rankings from 1999 to 2013
