= Baptist General Association of Virginia =

Umbrella organization of Baptist churches in Virginia

- Classification: Protestant
- Orientation: Baptist
- Scripture: Protestant Bible
- Theology: Evangelical Baptist
- Polity: Congregational
- Associations: Southern Baptist Convention, Baptist World Alliance
- Region: Virginia, USA
- Headquarters: Henrico County, Virginia, Virginia
- Origin: 1823
- Separations: Southern Baptist Conservatives of Virginia
- Congregations: 1,348
- Members: 610,000
- Official website: www.bgav.org

The Baptist General Association of Virginia (BGAV), founded in 1823, is an umbrella organization of Baptist churches in Virginia. It is affiliated with the Southern Baptist Convention and the Baptist World Alliance.

== History ==
Baptists have been in Virginia since the American Revolution, but had not organized as cooperating churches, preferring the independence common among Baptists. Not until June 3, 1822, was a formal Association formed, and then only “To propagate the Gospel and advance the Redeemer's Kingdom throughout the State.” It also emphasized that the work would be done while “not infringing the rights of individuals or churches.”

The BGAV emphasized missions from the beginning. At the first general meeting on June 7, 1823, the Association agreed to fund two church planting missionaries at $30 a month for two years. Until 2014, the BGAV met once annually, and relied on the Virginia Baptist Mission Board (VBMB) to administer the missions and provide continuing support to participating churches.

In September 1996, seven hundred churches left the BGAV to form the Southern Baptist Conservatives of Virginia. Since the BGAV does not prevent its member churches from dually aligning with another Baptist group, some of its members may also affiliate with the more conservative SBCV, though the BGAV and SBCV often disagree on priorities.

The BGAV joined the Baptist World Alliance in 2004 after the Southern Baptist Convention pulled out of the alliance. At the time, BGAV Executive Director John V. Upton, Jr., said, "Virginia Baptists have been a part of the BWA since its beginning in 1905. Our membership up to this point had been through the Southern Baptist Convention (SBC). The decision of the SBC to leave the BWA has automatically removed our membership. In this annual meeting Virginia Baptists have overwhelmingly voted to maintain that historic and strategic relationship." The BGAV contributes more to the Baptist World Alliance (BWA) than does any convention or union in the world.

In 2006, the BGAV received some Georgia Baptist churches that had requested affiliation. The move is unusual for Southern Baptist churches which almost universally affiliate with conventions in their states or region. But it represents a growing interest in denominational links by affinity rather than geography, say some observers.

In 2014, at the annual meeting of the BGAV approved some reorganization changes to their bylaws. One of which was a change in governance for the organization. Previously, policy making and the day-to-day operation of the organization relied on a 97-member Virginia Baptist Mission Board (VBMB). This bylaw moved the governing authority from the VBMB to a new 21-member executive board, and a new Mission Council of up to 120 members acting in a consulting capacity.

In 2017, Virginia Baptist Mission Board, Inc (VBMB) legally merged into the Baptist General Association of Virginia (BGAV).

According to a denomination census released in 2023, it claimed 610,000 members and 1,348 churches.

== Beliefs ==
The BGAV has been characterized as a moderate association.

The Association is a member of the Southern Baptist Convention and the Baptist World Alliance.
