= Jack Graham (pastor) =

American Baptist minister (born 1950)

Dr. Jack Graham
- Born: June 30, 1950 (age 76); Conway, Arkansas, U.S.

Jack N. Graham (born June 30, 1950) is an American pastor of Prestonwood Baptist Church in Plano, Texas.

== Early life and education ==
Born in Conway, Arkansas, near Little Rock, young Graham was baptized as a believer in Jesus at First Baptist Church in his hometown. From there, his life took a steady course into Christian ministry that continued during his formative years in Fort Worth, Texas, where he graduated from Eastern Hills High School.

In 1970, at twenty, he was ordained the pastor of his first church and married. He earned a B.S. from Hardin-Simmons University in Abilene, Texas.

By 1976, he and his wife Deb had a son; Graham was an associate pastor of Sagamore Hill Baptist Church in Fort Worth, which was head-pastored by G. Fred Swank. That year he also completed work for a Master of Divinity degree with honors from Southwestern Baptist Theological Seminary in Fort Worth. Four more years went by, and Graham received a Doctor of Ministry degree in "Church and Proclamation."

== Career ==
Graham began his ministry as pastor of East Side Baptist in Cross Plains, Texas (1970–1971). Following an associate pastorate at Sagamore Hill Baptist Church (1972–1975), he went on to pastor First Baptist Church in Hobart, Oklahoma (1975–1978), First Baptist Church in Duncan, Oklahoma (1978–1981), and First Baptist Church in West Palm Beach, Florida (1981–1989).

In 1989, Prestonwood Baptist Church, a Dallas megachurch with approximately 11,000 members, called Graham as pastor after its founding pastor, Bill Weber, admitted to an extramarital affair and resigned. Weber unsuccessfully sought to regain his old post, then convinced several of the church's wealthier members—including cosmetics magnate Mary Kay Ash—to support a new church he was starting.

Despite this, Prestonwood's membership rolls grew by 2,000 members annually, and it was apparent that it had outgrown its location in Dallas. A new 7,500-seat worship facility, school and ministry complex on 140 acres (0.57 km^{2}) was built in west Plano in 1999.

In 2006, Prestonwood opened its second campus in Prosper, near U.S. Route 380 and Dallas North Tollway. The church reached the 43,000-member mark in 2018, with regular attendance at worship services averaging about 17,000.

Graham has served two terms as president of the Southern Baptist Convention, the largest, most conservative American Baptist denomination, with 16 million members, and as president of the SBC Pastor's Conference. Paul Pressler, a retired judge from Houston, Texas, who was a leading figure in the Southern Baptist Convention conservative resurgence in 1979, served in 2002 as the first vice-president with Graham as the president.

Pastor Graham served as Honorary Chairman of the 2015 National Day of Prayer and was a member of Donald Trump's Religious Advisory Council. He participated in the National Prayer Service at the Washington National Cathedral the day after the inauguration.

== Controversies ==
In May 2022, Graham was named in a report on sexual abuse cases in Southern Baptist churches, which stated that he allowed a youth music minister at Prestonwood Baptist Church named John Langworthy, who had admitted to church officials that he had molested at least one student in the late 1980s, to be removed quietly and without notifying police. Langworthy was able to go on to become a youth music minister at Morrison Heights Baptist Church in Clinton, Mississippi, where he was later accused of abusing young boys again.

In June 2026, in the days before the annual Southern Baptist Convention, Graham used social media to label the SBC sexual abuse crisis a “reckless hoax.” Graham wrote, “As I said from the beginning the SBC does not have a systematic sexual abuse crisis. The whole thing was a reckless hoax which has cost us not only millions of dollars but immeasurable damage to our witness.” The sexual abuse crisis he referenced was detailed by the 2022 Guidepost Solutions Independent Report on the Southern Baptist Convention that found: “For almost two decades, survivors of abuse and other concerned Southern Baptists have been contacting the Southern Baptist Convention Executive Committee to report child molesters and other abusers who were in the pulpit or employed as church staff. They made phone calls, mailed letters, sent emails, appeared at SBC and EC meetings, held rallies, and contacted the press…only to be met, time and time again, with resistance, stonewalling, and even outright hostility from some within the Executive Committee.” In addition, the abuse had been detailed by the Houston Chronicle’s 2019 “Abuse of Faith” investigative series that found over 700 sex abuse victims over the prior 20 years in the Southern Baptist Convention.

== Theological views ==
Graham's theological views reflect the Southern Baptist Convention's Baptist Faith and Message (2000 edition).

== Published works ==
- You Can Make a Difference (1992)
- Diamonds in the Dark (1997)
- Lessons from the Heart (2001)
- A Hope and a Future (2002)
- Life According to Jesus (2004)
- A Man of God (2005)
- Courageous Parenting (2006)
- Are You Fit for Life? (2007)
- A Daily Encounter With God (2009)
- Powering Up (2009)
- Lifebook:The Authority, Authenticity, and Accuracy of God's Word. 2009. ISBN 978-1-934590-34-8.
- Culture Wise:Thinking Rightly About Seven Societal Wrongs. 2012. ISBN 978-1-934590-85-0.
- Unseen: Angels, Satan, Heaven, Hell, and Winning the Battle for Eternity. Baker Publishing Group. 2013. ISBN 978-1-4412-6229-5.
- Angels: Who They Are, What They Do, and Why It Matters. Baker Publishing Group. 2016. ISBN 978-1-4412-6551-7.

== See also ==
- List of Southern Baptist Convention affiliated people
- Southern Baptist Convention
- Southern Baptist Convention Presidents

Preceded by James Merritt	President of the Southern Baptist Convention; 2002–2003	Succeeded by Bobby Welch
