= James Merritt =

James Merritt may refer to:

- James Merritt (minister) (born 1952), president of the Southern Baptist Convention
- James Merritt (Australian politician) (1856–1943), member of the Victorian Legislative Council
- Jim Merritt (American politician) (born 1959), member of the Indiana Senate
- Jim Merritt (baseball) (born 1943), American baseball pitcher
- Jymie Merritt (1926–2020), American jazz bassist, bandleader, and composer

== See also ==
- James Merritt Ives (1824–1895), American lithographer
