= Homer Edwin Young =

American pastor (born 1936)

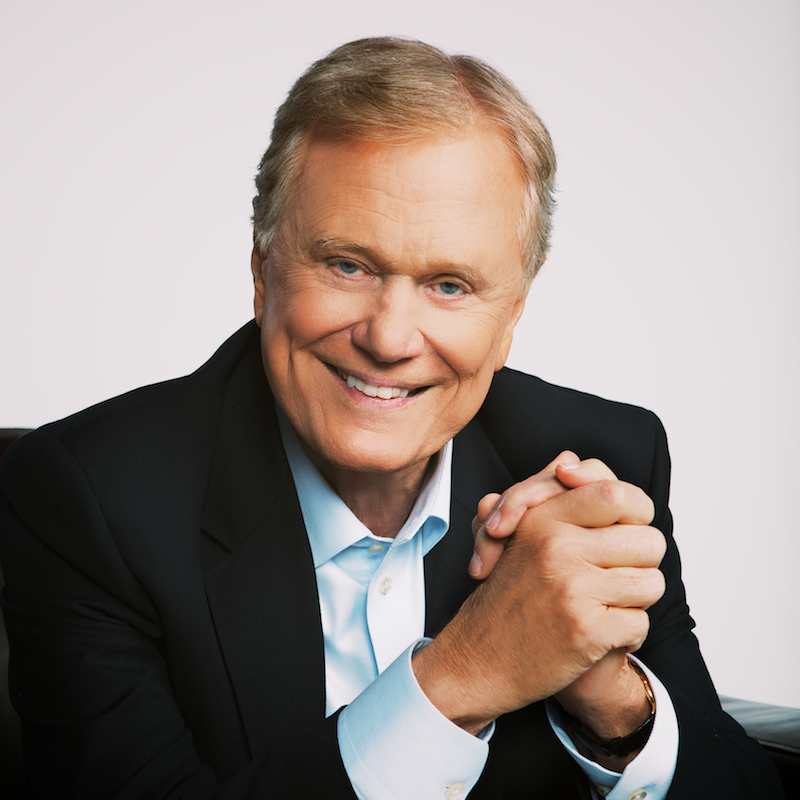
- Young in 2012
- Church: Second Baptist Church Houston
- Installed: 1968

Personal details
- Born: August 11, 1936 (age 90) Laurel, Mississippi, U.S.
- Denomination: Southern Baptist
- Spouse: Jo Beth Landrum (m. 1959; died 2017) Lisa Milne (m. 2020)
- Children: 3, including Ed
- Occupation: Pastor

Homer Edwin Young (born August 11, 1936), often called simply Ed Young, is the former senior pastor of the megachurch Second Baptist Church of Houston, Texas. He is father to sons Ed Young, pastor of Fellowship Church in Grapevine, Texas; Ben Young, at Second Baptist Houston; and Cliff Young, director of Second Films and leader of the Christian folk/pop group Caedmon's Call.

== Early life and education ==
Young was born on August 11, 1936, in Laurel in southeastern Mississippi to an impoverished family.

He entered the University of Alabama at Tuscaloosa as an engineering major. But halfway through his freshman year, he answered the call of the ministry and enrolled at Mississippi College in Clinton. He went on to the Southeastern Baptist Theological Seminary in Wake Forest, North Carolina.

== Career ==
"Young was elected president of the Southern Baptist Convention in June of 1992, and again in June, 1993." He has a broadcast ministry called The Winning Walk that can be accessed internationally. He is the author to dozens of books including Healing Broken America, Standing on the Promises, Total Heart Health for Men, Total Heart Health for Women, The 10 Commandments of Parenting and The 10 Commandments of Marriage.

As of April 23, 2010, Young had sold "nearly 12,000 CDs and DVDs."

=== Ministership ===
Young started as a pastor in North Carolina, despite the wishes of his father. Moving to South Carolina, he pastored Taylors First Baptist Church (1968–1971) and First Baptist Church Columbia (1972–1978) before moving to Second Baptist Church Houston.

Under his leadership, Second Baptist grew from an average weekend attendance of 500 in 1978 to a membership of over 80,000 in 2019. Young was a pioneer of the multisite church, and in 1999, Second Baptist became one church in two locations. As of the spring of 2015 when the last campus was opened, Second Baptist Church occupies six campuses in the Houston metropolitan area and, as of January 2017, has an online campus where each week's sermon is livestreamed daily.

Young assisted in the creation and organization of Houston's relief work following Tropical Storm Allison and Hurricanes Katrina, Rita, Ike, and Harvey as well as the COVID-19 pandemic.

Young along with Bishop James Dixon, Senior Pastor of Community of Faith Church, developed and launched Loving Kids, a joint venture ministry designed to make a difference in Houston's Acres Homes subdivision by collaboratively adopting three local Houston elementary schools "to help support children by way of mentors, tutors and teacher assistants."

In 2024, he ended his term as leader of the church, and his son became the leader.

=== Controversy ===
Young has garnered some controversy for sermons that call for progressive local politicians in Houston and Harris County to be voted out due to rising homicide rates. Some have called for his church's tax exemption to be removed for the politically charged comments, but a law professor at the University of Houston Law Center said the comments were unlikely to result in such a penalty.

Young has faced criticism both for his leadership of the Southern Baptist Convention with regard to prevention of sexual abuse in the churches and for the Second Baptist's handling of two sexual abuse claims against a contract-employed coordinator of music pageants, John Forse, in 1994 and against a former youth pastor, Chad Foster, in 2010. The Second Baptist church has settled two lawsuits filed by Foster's victims.

== Personal life ==
On September 7, 2017, Young's wife, Jo Beth Young, died at the age of 80. Married for 58 years, the couple had three children and 11 grandchildren.

In 1988, Young had angioplasty to open a clogged heart artery. In his 2005 book Total Heart Health for Men Workbook, he wrote about methods of reducing the risk of heart problems as he was familiar with. In May 2010, he underwent triple coronary bypass surgery.

== Works ==
- H. Edwin Young (1981). The Lord is--. Broadman Press. ISBN 0-8054-1526-2.
- H. Edwin Young (1982). A winning walk. Broadman Press. ISBN 0-8054-5191-9.
- H. Edwin Young (1984). David, after God's own heart. Broadman Press. ISBN 0-8054-1531-9.
- Edwin Young (1985). The purpose of suffering. Harvest House Publishers. ISBN 0-89081-496-1.
- H. Edwin Young (1992). Against all odds: family survival in a hostile world. T. Nelson Publishers. ISBN 0-8407-7664-0.
- H. Edwin Young (1993). Romancing the Home: How to Have a Marriage That Sizzles. Broadman & Holman Publishers. ISBN 0-8054-6086-1.
- H. Edwin Young (1995). Been There. Done That. Now What?: The Meaning of Life May Surprise You. Broadman & Holman Publishers. ISBN 0-8054-6158-2.
- Ed Young (2004). The Ten Commandments of Marriage. Moody Publishers. ISBN 0-8024-3145-3.
- Michael Duncan; Richard Leachman; Ed Young; Kristy Brown (2005). Total Heart Health for Men Workbook: Achieving a Total Heart Health Lifestyle in 90 Days. Thomas Nelson Inc. ISBN 1-4185-0126-3.
- H. Edwin Young (2005). The 10 Commandments of Parenting: The Do's and Don'ts for Raising Great Kids. Moody Publishers. ISBN 0-8024-3148-8.

== See also ==
- Southern Baptist Convention Presidents
- Christianity in Houston

Preceded by Morris Chapman	President of the Southern Baptist Convention; 1993–1994	Succeeded by Jim Henry
