= Stay-at-home =

Stay-at-home may refer to:

- Stay-at-home dad, a male parent who is the main caregiver of the children and the home
- Stay-at-home daughter, a woman who lives at home until she is married
- Stay-at-home defenceman, a hockey defenceman who plays a very defensive minded game
- Stay-at-home mom, a female parent who is the main caregiver of the children and the home
- Stay-at-home order, a quarantine measure to control spreading of a disease
