= Prestonwood Baptist Church =

Church in Texas, United States

Coordinates: 33°1′44.00″N 96°50′49.30″W

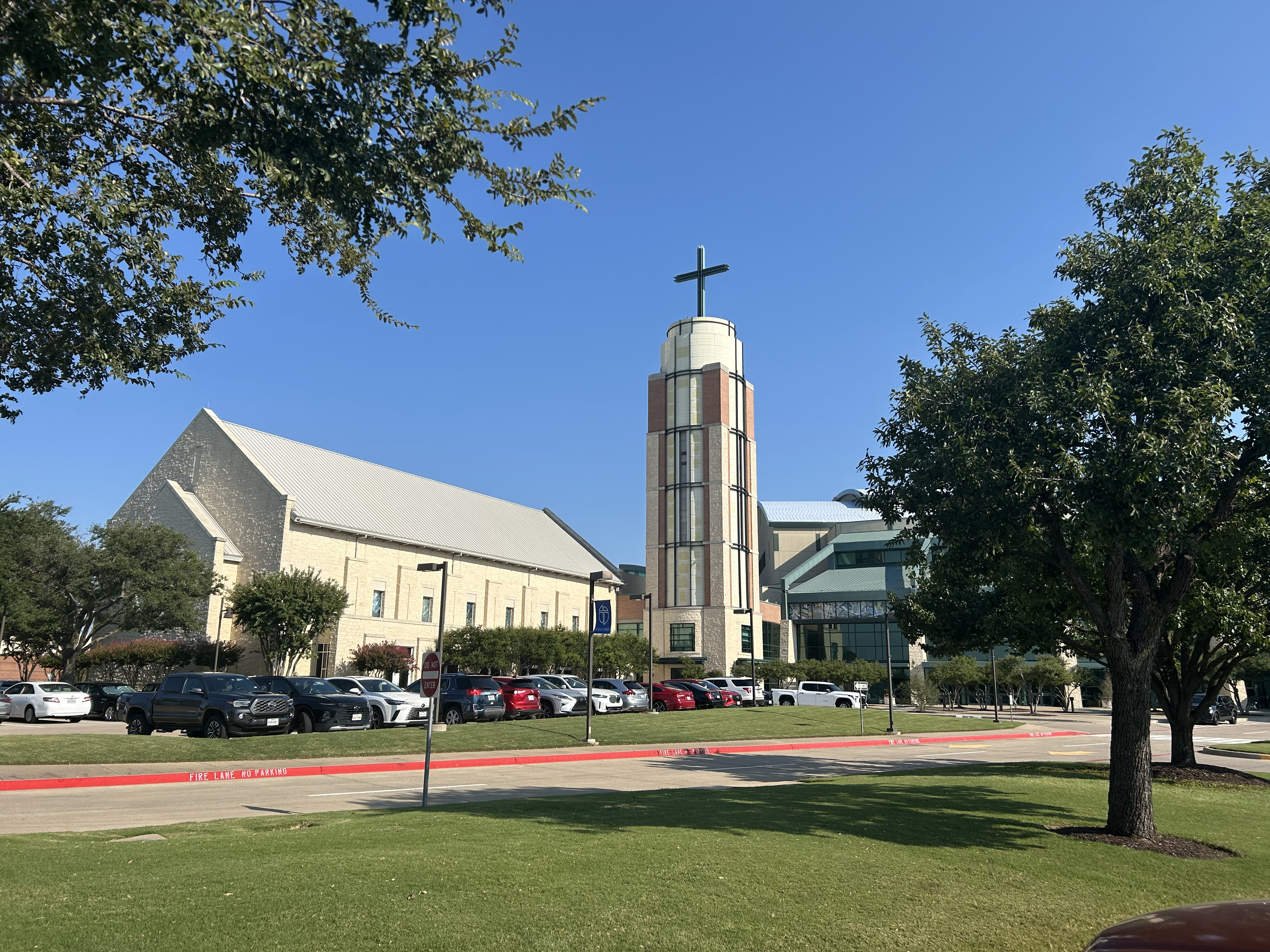
- Prestonwood Baptist Church
- Location: 6801 W. Park Blvd; Plano, Texas 75093
- Country: United States
- Denomination: Baptist
- Website: prestonwood.org

History
- Founded: 1977
- Founder: Bill Weber

Architecture
- Completed: 1999 (Plano Campus), 2006 (North Campus)

Administration
- Division: Southern Baptists of Texas Convention

Clergy
- Pastor(s): Kaleb Moore (worship), Jonathan Teague (executive), Neal Jeffrey (pastoral & preaching), Gilberto Corredera (Prestonwood en Español - lead pastor), Orbe Perez (Prestonwood en Español pastor - Lewisville Campus)

Prestonwood Baptist Church is a Baptist multi-site megachurch based in Plano, Texas. It is affiliated with the Southern Baptist Convention and the Southern Baptists of Texas Convention. It is one of the largest churches in America, with a membership of over 45,000 and a weekly attendance of around 17,000.

The Plano campus covers an area of 140 acres (0.219 sq mi; 0.567 km^{2}), and includes a 7,000-seat worship center, a school offering pre-kindergarten through grade 12 (including a football stadium, a baseball field, and a fieldhouse for basketball and volleyball), a fitness center with outdoor sports fields, a café, a library, and a bookstore.

In 2006, the church expanded to include a second campus of nearly 128 acres (0.200 sq mi; 0.518 km^{2}) in Prosper. The north campus also has a primary–secondary school.

== History ==
Prestonwood was founded on February 6, 1977, in North Dallas, as a mission church of Northway Baptist Church. Under founding pastor Bill Weber, the new church grew considerably, and in 1979 moved into a permanent facility near the corner of Arapaho and Hillcrest Roads in Dallas.

By 1988, Prestonwood had grown to 11,000 members. In October of that year, Dr. Weber resigned and was replaced in mid-1989 by Dr. Jack Graham as senior pastor of Prestonwood. By this time, Prestonwood was considered a "megachurch" because of its rapid expansion into one of the fastest-growing churches in the United States.

By the mid-1990s, it became apparent that the church had outgrown its north Dallas home; the facility was landlocked with no ability to expand. In 1994, the church's leadership began plans for a 7,000-seat worship center in Plano. Services were first held on May 2, 1999. The church continued to expand its facilities throughout the next decade. Soon after the opening of the new worship center, the first phase of the new Prestonwood Sports and Fitness Center was completed. In August 2003, the church completed the second phase of the building, which featured a new chapel, a 100-foot-tall (30m) "Faith Tower" topped by a cross, a student ministry area, restaurant and commons, additional space for Bible fellowship and administrative offices. Two years later, the Prestonwood Christian Academy Upper School opened on the west side of the church campus.

In November 2018, CBS News listed Prestonwood Baptist Church as the 26th largest megachurch in the United States with about 15,815 weekly visitors. In 2018, Ivanka Trump donated $50,000 to the church, according to Graham.

The church reached the 46,000-member mark in 2019, with regular attendance at worship services averaging around 17,000.

In September 2020, sitting Secretary of State Mike Pompeo spoke during a Sunday service.

== Sexual assault allegations ==
In June of 1989, after a youth music minister at Prestonwood Baptist Church admitted to church officials that he had molested at least one student in the late 1980s; he was terminated immediately. Since church officials failed to report it to the authorities (as was required under the State Family Code), he was able to go on to become a youth music minister at a church in Mississippi. He was later accused of abusing young boys again.

In May of 2008, an associate minister at Prestonwood was arrested for soliciting sex from a 13-year-old girl. Two days later, Senior Pastor Jack Graham addressed the scandal from the pulpit. In his address, Dr. Graham said the accused associate minister had been terminated.

In March of 2013, a decade-long church member was ordered off church premises and reported to the police as a 'suspicious person, possibly violent" because he raised questions on Facebook about church leaders failing to alert the authorities about abuse committed by the music minister above.

== Campuses ==
Prestonwood operates two church campuses: Plano (the Plano Campus, which houses full services in both English and Spanish, as well as smaller fellowships to other ethnic groups) and Prosper (the North Campus). The Lewisville branch of the Spanish services are held at Northview Baptist Church, an existing and independent Southern Baptist congregation.
