= Dorothy Patterson =

Dorothy Kelley Patterson (born 1943) is an American Christian theologian who most served as a professor of theology in women's studies at Southwestern Baptist Theological Seminary. She is married to former SWBTS president Paige Patterson.

== Biography ==
=== Education ===
Dorothy Patterson has degrees from Hardin-Simmons University, New Orleans Baptist Theological Seminary, Luther Rice Seminary, and the University of South Africa.

=== Career ===
While her husband was president of Southwestern Baptist Theological Seminary (SWBTS) from 2003 to 2018, Patterson was a faculty member in the School of Theology there. Patterson was once described as "one of today's leading scholars on the topic of biblical womanhood." She was fired in 2018 after her husband was fired for his handling of rape investigations.

In 2013, Patterson initiated a 12-year project of installing over 60 stained glass windows on the SWBTS campus to honor leaders in the conservative resurgence. Two of the windows depicted Patterson and her husband. 32 windows had been installed by April 2019, when SWBTS trustees decided to remove the windows from public view after the allegations against Pressler and Patterson's cover-up were revealed.

In May 2019, an SWBTS former student, named "Jane Roe" in legal papers, filed a lawsuit against Paige Patterson for threatening, intimidating, and humiliating her when she told him that she had been repeatedly raped at gunpoint in 2014 and 2015 by another seminary student. After Roe withdrew from SWBTS in 2015, Dorothy Patterson allegedly sent Jane Roe a message that she was "certainly doing the right thing to move away” and should not be “casting blame on someone else" for what happened.

== Publications ==
- A woman seeking God : discover God in the places of your life, 1992
- BeAttitudes for women : wisdom from heaven for life on earth, 2000
- A handbook for ministers' wives : sharing the blessings of your marriage, family, and home, 2002
- Where's mom? : the high calling of wives and mothers, 2003
- A handbook for parents in ministry : training up a child while answering the call, 2004
- Devotional for women, 2015
