= Girls Gone Bible =

Christian podcast

Angela Halili (left) and Arielle Reitsma (right) at AmericaFest 2025.

Girls Gone Bible is a podcast hosted by Angela Halili and Arielle Reitsma launched in 2023. Their content can be found on YouTube, Spotify, and TikTok. The name of the podcast is a reference to Girls Gone Wild. Both women converted to Christianity in adulthood after experiencing dissatisfaction with their careers as actors. As of December 2025, the podcast had an average of a million monthly listeners. In 2026, Girls Gone Bible went on tour across the United States.

== Content ==
In contrast to other popular Christian podcasts, Girls Gone Bible usually stays away from overt political messaging while promoting evangelical talking points such as modesty and abstinence before marriage. People who listen to religious podcasts like Girls Gone Bible tend to be young and interested in non-denominational messaging.

The duo has also published a devotional entitled Out of the Wilderness that was inspired by their personal experiences. The book is intended to be completed over a 31 day period.

== See also ==
- Christian right
- Girl Defined
- Fundie Fridays
