= H. Edwin Young =

H. Edwin Young may refer to:

- Hugh Edwin Young (1917–2012), economist and president of the University of Wisconsin system
- Homer Edwin Young (born 1936), senior pastor of the Second Baptist Church Houston
