= Ed Young (Fellowship Church) =

American pastor and author (born 1961)

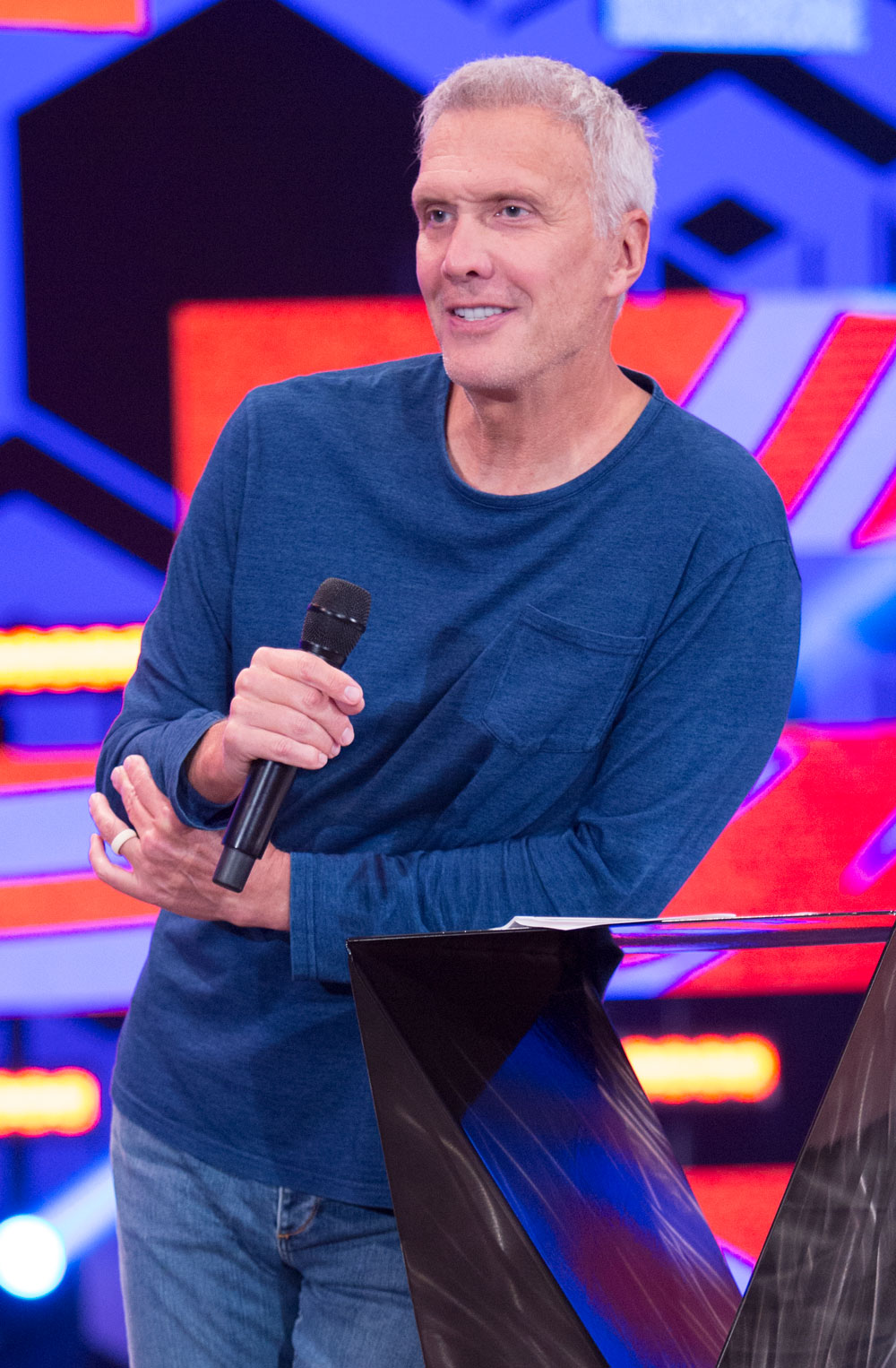
- Pastor Ed Young of Fellowship Church
- Born: Edwin Barry Young; March 16, 1961 (age 65); Canton, North Carolina
- Occupation: Pastor
- Spouse: Lisa Young
- Children: 4
- Relatives: Homer Edwin Young (father)
- Writing career
- Notable awards: New York Times Best Seller; 2012

Edwin Barry "Ed" Young (born March 16, 1961) is the founding and senior pastor of Fellowship Church.

== Early life ==
Born in Canton, North Carolina, Young is the oldest son of Homer Edwin Young, senior pastor of Second Baptist Church Houston in Houston, Texas. He attended Florida State University in Tallahassee, Florida, where he received a basketball scholarship. After his sophomore year, he transferred to Houston Baptist University where he received his bachelor's degree, followed by a Master of Divinity from Southwestern Baptist Theological Seminary in Fort Worth, Texas.

== Early ministry work ==
After his studies, he returned to Houston, Texas to work at Second Baptist Church Houston as an associate pastor.

== Fellowship Church ==
In February 1989, Young began Fellowship Church out of a rented office complex before moving to an arts center. In 1996, Fellowship Church moved into Irving's MacArthur High School to accommodate five weekend services and a weekly attendance of 5,000. Fellowship Church opened its first permanent facility on a 141-acre (0.57 sq km) property in Grapevine, Texas in 1998.

In 2003, Fellowship Church opened its first two satellite locations in Plano and Fort Worth, Texas. A third satellite campus launched two years later in Dallas, Texas. Across the four locations, weekly attendance exceeded 20,000. In May 2006, Fellowship Church opened a satellite campus in South Miami, Florida and North Port, Florida in 2017. In August 2018, Journey Church in Norman, Oklahoma became Fellowship Church Norman. The South Miami, North Port, and Norman locations were later sold to other groups.

In 2008, Fellowship Church hosted its first summer camp and retreat center in Hawkins, Texas at Allaso Ranch.

== C3 Global and the Creative Church Conference ==
Young leads C3 Global and the Creative Church Conference. The annual conference is held in Grapevine, Texas and features Christian leaders who speak on the importance of creative and compelling communication in church culture, among other topics.

== Outreach ==
When Haiti was struck by an earthquake in 2010, Fellowship Church and C3 Global began providing relief and to date has provided almost 11 million meals. In partnership with C3 Global, FC hosts an annual retreat for Gold Star families with America's Mighty Warriors, with past guests Rick Perry, Glenn Beck, and Mike Huckabee. In 2016, Fellowship Church opened its first prison campus, God Behind Bars. It has since opened 2 more prison campuses. In 2017, Fellowship Church participated in relief recovery for those impacted by Hurricane Harvey.

== Television and media ==
Ed Young Television program was the first religious program of its kind to air on the E! Channel in 2010. Ed Young TV has also been seen on EdYoung.com, Roku, and Netflix.

In 2003, Young published the book Know Fear: Facing Life's Six Most Common Phobias. Young outlines six types of fear in his book, fear of: helplessness, the future, commitment, failure, loneliness, death and God.

Young has been the subject of significant national and regional media coverage throughout his ministry. In 2006, Young and Fellowship Church's CreativePastors.com were featured in a front-page article in The Wall Street Journal, which examined the growing online distribution and use of sermon resources and highlighted the widespread influence of Young's sermons among pastors nationwide.

In 2008, The New York Times featured Young and his wife, Lisa, for Fellowship Church's "Sexperiment" marriage series, which received national attention for its unconventional approach to encouraging marital intimacy. In January 2012, they published the book Sexperiment: 7 Days to Lasting Intimacy With Your Spouse, which covers suggestions for how the church can facilitate appropriate conversations about sex.

Christianity Today profiled Young's ministry and leadership philosophy, highlighting Fellowship Church's innovative approach to church growth and communication.

Young has been recognized as one of North Texas' leading faith leaders through inclusion in D CEO's annual Dallas 500, which recognizes influential business, civic, and nonprofit leaders throughout the region.

In 2021, D Magazine featured Young alongside former Major League Baseball pitcher Nolan Ryan and other prominent Dallas-area fathers in its Father's Day feature, Fatherly Advice from a Few of Dallas' Most Notable Dads.

D Magazine also profiled Young and Fellowship Church in its 2014 feature The Megachurch Boom, examining the church's growth and influence in North Texas.

In November 2023, Young and his wife Lisa published the book A Path through Pain: How Faith Deepens and Joy Grows through What You Would Never Choose. The book discusses their family's journey through pain, sorrow, hope, and other emotions associated with the loss of their daughter LeeBeth.

Young and his wife, Lisa, have been married since 1982 and have four children. Together they have frequently taught and written on marriage, parenting, family life, and Christian relationships.

In 2010, WFAA-TV reported on Fellowship Church's lease of a Falcon 50 aircraft, Young's compensation, and other financial benefits. The report was criticized by the journalism-analysis website GetReligion, which questioned WFAA's reliance on anonymous sources, the extent of their contribution to the reporting, and the lack of corroborating reporting by other news organizations. The Christian Post also reported Fellowship Church's response to the allegations, including statements from board members defending Young's integrity and the church's financial oversight, while not independently evaluating the accuracy of WFAA's claims.

Following the report, Fellowship Church's board of directors disputed WFAA's allegations, stating that the church's lease and use of the aircraft, as well as its related financial practices, were conducted in compliance with applicable FAA and IRS requirements.

== Bibliography ==
- Young, Ed; Young, Lisa (2023). A Path Through Pain. Zondervan. ISBN 978-0310366935.
- Young, Ed (2012). The 10 Commandments of Parenting. Unilit. ISBN 9780789918796.
- Young, Ed (2011). The Sexperiment. Hachette Digital, Inc. ISBN 978-0446582711.
- Young, Ed (2007). Outrageous, Contagious Joy. Berkley Trade. ISBN 978-0425219089.
- Young, Ed (2006). The Creative Leader – Unleashing the Power of Your Creative Potential. B&H Publishing Group. ISBN 978-0805431773.
- Young, Ed (2006). X-Trials : Takin' Life to the Extreme. Thomas Nelson. ISBN 978-1574941210.
- Young, Ed (2005). You! The Journey to the Center of Your Worth. Howard Books. ISBN 978-1451646146.
- Young, Ed (2004). Kid CEO - How to Keep Your Children From Running Your Life. FaithWords. ISBN 978-0446691772.
- Young, Ed (2003). Know Fear - Facing Life's Six Most Common Phobias. B&H Publishing Group. ISBN 978-0805425727.
- Young, Ed (2003). High Definition Living – Bringing Clarity to Your Life's Mission. Howard Books. ISBN 978-1582292908.
- Young, Ed (2002). Can We Do That? 24 Innovative Practices That Will Change the Way You Do Church. Howard Publishing Company. ISBN 978-1582292380.
- Young, Ed (1997). Fatal Distractions – Overcoming Obstacles That Mess Up Our Lives. Thomas Nelson. ISBN 978-0785276661.
