= Southern Baptist Convention conservative resurgence =

1979 resurgence campaign

Beginning in 1979, the Southern Baptist Convention (SBC) experienced an intense struggle for control of the organization. Its initiators called it the conservative resurgence while its detractors labeled it the fundamentalist takeover. It was launched with the charge that the seminaries and denominational agencies were dominated by liberals. The movement was primarily aimed at reorienting the denomination towards a more fundamentalist, conservative trajectory.

It was achieved by the systematic election, beginning in 1979, of conservative individuals to lead the SBC. Theologically moderate and liberal leaders were voted out of office. Many senior, dedicated employees were fired from their jobs. Moderate and liberal presidents, professors, and department heads of Southern Baptist seminaries, mission groups and other convention-owned institutions were replaced with conservatives.

The resurgence is said by some to be the most serious controversy ever to occur within the SBC, the largest Protestant denomination in the United States. Albert Mohler later described it as a "reformation ... achieved at an incredibly high cost." A part of that cost was the departure of 1,900 churches from the convention, which broke away in 1990 to form the Cooperative Baptist Fellowship, a moderate Baptist group which affirms women in ordained ministry and emphasizes the Baptist principles of the autonomy of the local church, the priesthood of all believers, and soul liberty.

== Earlier 20th-century controversies ==
Throughout the 20th century, controversy had flared up sporadically among Southern Baptists over the nature of biblical authority and how to interpret the Bible. Until 1925 the SBC did not have a specific, formal confession of faith; whenever an issue arose it had looked to two earlier and more general baptistic confessions of faith produced in the United States: the Philadelphia Confession of Faith (1742) and the New Hampshire Confession of Faith of 1833.

This would change when in the 1920s, Baptist pastor J. Frank Norris, described as "one of the most controversial and flamboyant figures in the history of fundamentalism", led a campaign upon the SBC (from which he would later depart), particularly against Southwestern Baptist Theological Seminary in Fort Worth and Baylor University in Waco, Texas. In response, the SBC adopted its first formal confession of faith, the Baptist Faith and Message.

== Background ==
The unity of the SBC had historically been functional rather than doctrinal. The founders wrote: "We have constructed for our basis no new creed; acting in this matter upon a Baptist aversion for all creeds but the Bible".

The famed Southern Baptist unity in the past has been more functional than theological. Southern Baptists have banded together to cooperate in ministry, in missions, evangelism, and in Christian education. So long as they emphasize functional ministry, the "rope of sand", as one historian called it, holds; when they switch from function to doctrine, unity is threatened.

— Baptist historian H. Leon McBeth

Some have tried to argue that Baptists have always avoided creeds. In fact, doctrinal statements have been a part of Baptist life at least since the 17th century. The early SBC saw no need for such a statement since most of its member churches affirmed either the New Hampshire Confession of Faith or the Philadelphia Confession. By the 1920s, with the rise of liberalism and neo-orthodoxy in other denominations, Southern Baptists saw the need to define their beliefs in a formal doctrinal statement. Thus, they adopted the 1925 Baptist Faith and Message.

By the 1970s, many conservatives in the SBC felt certain seminary professors had drifted from basic Baptist doctrines. In a formal statement, they declared their commitment to "doctrinal unity in functional diversity", placing an emphasis on biblical authority. Conservatives argued that their beliefs did indeed represent a consensus among Southern Baptists. These individuals felt that while early Southern Baptists agreed on basic theological issues, by the 1970s many of these beliefs had come under attack in schools owned and operated by the SBC.

=== "Genesis" controversy ===
In July 1961, Ralph Elliott, an Old Testament scholar at Midwestern Baptist Theological Seminary in Kansas City, published a book entitled The Message of Genesis containing his interpretation of the book of Genesis. Elliott considered his book a "very moderate" volume, though this is vastly disputed. Some prominent Southern Baptists, however, saw the book in a different light and took issue with Elliot's use of historical-critical methodology, his portrayal of Genesis 1-11 as mythological literature and his speculation that Melchizedek was a priest of Baal and not, as generally believed by Christians, of Yahweh.

The "Genesis controversy" quickly pervaded the entire SBC. In strong reaction to the controversy, the 1962 SBC meeting elected as its president Rev. K. Owen White, pastor of First Baptist Church Houston, who had written a prominent criticism of Elliott's views. This began what has become an ongoing trend for SBC presidents to be elected on the basis of their theology. Broadman Press, the publishing arm of the Baptist Sunday School Board (now LifeWay Christian Resources) in Nashville, was immediately criticized, and their other materials, including Sunday School quarterlies, became suspect. Elliott's book was withdrawn from publication, and he was later dismissed from Midwestern for insubordination.

=== 1963 Baptist Faith and Message revision ===
In 1963, the SBC adopted the first revision of the Baptist Faith and Message, amending it to include confessional positions more conservative than contained in the original. However, it was not without its critics: one of the architects of the conservative resurgence described it as "having been infected with neo-orthodox theology."

=== Broadman Bible Commentary ===
In the 1960s, the Sunday School Board, in its most ambitious publishing project, produced the 12-volume Broadman Bible Commentary. Its first volume, covering Genesis and Exodus, came out in 1969. In addition to providing further fuel for the controversy surrounding the Creation account in Genesis, a section written by G. Henton Davies, a Welsh Baptist, questioned the reliability of the biblical episode in which God commands Abraham to sacrifice his son Isaac on the grounds that such an event was morally troubling. This publication immediately stirred a new phase of the ongoing controversy. Some argued that the SBC was trying to stifle dissent. Others pointed out that since Broadman Press was owned by the SBC, its publications should not stray so far from the beliefs of most Southern Baptists.

=== Seminary issues ===
Conservative Southern Baptists of this time bemoaned what they claimed was the growing presence of liberal ideology within the SBC's own seminaries. Clark H. Pinnock, who later became an advocate of open theism, taught at the New Orleans Baptist Theological Seminary in the late 1960s and early 1970s. Pinnock is said to have been much more conservative in those days, at which time he argued that liberal professors should be dismissed. He did not embrace more liberal views until later. Ironically, he was a great influence on future conservative leaders, including Paige Patterson.

In 1976, a Southern Baptist Theological Seminary (SBTS) master's degree student, Noel Wesley Hollyfield, Jr., presented survey results that revealed an inverse correlation between length of attendance at SBTS and Christian orthodoxy. While 87% of first year Master of Divinity students at SBTS reporting believing "Jesus is the Divine Son of God and I have no doubts about it," only 63% of final year graduate students made that claim, according to Hollyfield's analysis. In 1981, redacted information from Hollyfield's thesis was put into tract form and distributed by conservatives as evidence of the need for reform from apostasy within SBC agencies.

=== 1970 meeting ===
The 1970 SBC meeting in Denver, Colorado, under the leadership of President W. A. Criswell, was marked by hostilities. Controversy erupted over several explosive issues. At least 17 Baptist state papers questioned editorially the "unchristian," "bitter, " "vitriolic," "arrogant," and "militant" spirit and attitude of some of the messengers (delegates from SBC congregations to the annual meeting). The messengers refused to hear an explanation about the Broadman Bible Commentary from the head of the Sunday School Board. Messengers actually "hooted and hollered at" Herschel H. Hobbs, the respected elder statesman and former president of the SBC, when he urged restraint.

=== 1971 meeting ===
At the 1971 annual meeting in St. Louis, almost two years before Roe v. Wade was decided, the messengers passed the SBC's first resolution on the topic of abortion. The resolution was by no means conservative: in addition to supporting abortion in cases of rape or incest—a position supported by some conservatives—it also supported it in such cases as "clear evidence of severe fetal deformity, and carefully ascertained evidence of the likelihood of damage to the emotional, mental, and physical health of the mother".

The messengers at the 1974 meeting in Dallas (the year after Roe was decided) reaffirmed the 1971 resolution, saying that it "dealt responsibly from a Christian perspective with complexities of abortion problems in contemporary society" while also in the same resolution saying that the SBC "historically held a high view of the sanctity of human life".

== Conservative strategy ==
In the early 1970s, SBC employee William Powell developed a rather simple strategy to take control of the SBC: elect the SBC president for ten consecutive years. Under the SBC bylaws, the president had sole authority to appoint the entirety of the Committee on Committees (known during most of the controversy as the Committee on Boards); the appointments did not require approval of the messengers at an annual meeting. This committee, in turn, nominated the members of the Committee on Nominations to be approved by the Messengers at the next annual meeting (i.e. one year after the president is elected and he appoints the Committee on Committees), which in turn nominated appointees for vacant positions to be approved by the messengers at the subsequent annual meeting (i.e., two years from the initial Committee on Committees appointments, and one year after the Committee on Nominations makes its recommendations).

The process involved numerous overlaps: at an annual meeting the messengers approved (or rejected) the nominees for positions recommended by the Committee on Nominations (the process of which started two years prior), approved nominations for the upcoming Committee on Nominations recommended by the Committee on Committees (which took place the prior year), and further elected the president, who would appoint the new Committee on Committees.

Therefore, if conservatives could gain the presidency, the president would nominate conservatives to the Committee on Committees, who would in turn nominate other conservatives to the Committee on Nominations, and then in turn fill the various vacancies with conservatives. If they could gain and hold the presidency for ten years, they would accomplish the goal of having all agency heads be conservatives.

=== Takeover chronology ===
1976. Paul Pressler, a former state representative and a judge in Houston, Texas, and Paige Patterson, president of Criswell College in Dallas, met in New Orleans to plan the successful political strategy to elect like-minded conservative convention presidents and in turn members of SBC boards.

1978. W. A. Criswell and Adrian Rogers, along with Pressler and Patterson, met with a group of pastors and laymen at a hotel near the Atlanta airport to launch the resurgence. They understood Powell's contention that electing the president of the SBC was the key to redirecting the entirety of the denomination. The Atlanta group determined to elect Rogers, pastor of Bellevue Baptist Church in Memphis, Tennessee, as the first Conservative Resurgence president of the convention.

1979 Houston convention. The 1979 SBC meeting in Houston produced two important developments:

1. The concept of Inerrancy. Southern Baptists applied a new word, "inerrancy", to their understanding of Scripture. Since 1650 the adjective most used by Baptists to describe their view of the Bible had been "infallible"; however, the term "inerrancy" had been implied in the 1833 New Hampshire Baptist Confession of Faith ("truth without any mixture of error") in wording that, by this time, had already been incorporated into the 1925 and 1963 editions of the Baptist Faith and Message. The word "inerrancy" was also used by the prominent Southern Baptist scholar A. T. Robertson in the late 19th century. Some reformed theologians in Europe had utilized the term "inerrancy" in the same way that North American theologians used "infallibility." Many conservative leaders championed the word "inerrancy" in this phase of the ongoing controversy—a phase that would later become known as the "inerrancy controversy."
2. Orchestration from the sky boxes. A well-organized political campaign, using precinct style politics, wrested control of the SBC. Such tactics were not unprecedented; Jimmy Allen had openly campaigned for the office just two years earlier. Pressler and Patterson were accused of directing the affairs of the 1979 meeting from sky boxes high above The Summit where the SBC was meeting. Pressler said such accusations were false. The election on the first ballot of the more conservative Rogers began the ten-year process. Ever since that meeting, with the exception of 2004 and 2005, the conservatives of the denomination have nominated their choice for president. Each has appointed more conservative individuals, who in turn appointed others, who nominated the trustees, who elected the agency heads and institutional presidents, including those of the seminaries. Throughout the 1980s, Conservative Resurgence advocates gained control over the SBC leadership at every level from the administration to key faculty at their seminaries and slowly turned the SBC towards more conservative positions on many social issues. By early 1989 nearly every one of the SBC boards had a majority of takeover people on it. The Fundamentalist Takeover in the Southern Baptist Convention cites the following as further key events in the resurgence:

1980: At the annual meeting in St. Louis, the messengers reversed their position on abortion (which was passed nine years earlier). This time they passed a resolution condemning the practice, making an exception only to save the life of the mother. Since then, every SBC resolution on the topic has been in strong opposition to reproductive rights and has expanded into similar topics such as fetal tissue experimentation, RU-486, and taxpayer funding of abortions generally and Planned Parenthood specifically.

1981: Cecil Sherman, a leader of the moderate faction of Southern Baptists, declared in a debate with Patterson that he did not believe in an inerrant Bible but in "...a ‘dynamical’ view of the Bible's inspiration and then pointed to what he saw as contradictions in the biblical text.

1984: The SBC voted in Kansas City to adopt a strongly worded resolution against women in the pastorate. The rationale cited was that "the New Testament emphasizes the equal dignity of men and women (Gal. 3:28)" but that "The Scriptures teach that women are not in public worship to assume a role of authority over men lest confusion reign in the local church (1 Cor. 14:33-36)".

1987: William Randall Lolley, the president of Southeastern Baptist Theological Seminary in Wake Forest, North Carolina, resigned after the trustees voted to hire only faculty members who follow the Baptist Faith and Message.

1987: The SBC voted in St. Louis to adopt a report from "The Peace Committee" that had been set up in 1985. The report identified the roots of the controversy as primarily theological and called on Baptist seminaries to teach in accordance with the Bible.

1988: At the SBC Convention in San Antonio, a resolution was passed critical of the liberal interpretation of the "priesthood of the believer" and "soul competency." Moderates and liberals accused conservatives of elevating the pastor to the position of authority in the church he serves.

1990: Roy Honeycutt, president of the Southern Baptist Theological Seminary in Louisville, Kentucky, was accused by a new trustee of "not believing the Bible." The trustee cited some of Honeycutt's own writings as evidence. This same trustee would later become chairman of the seminary board shortly after resurgency leader Albert Mohler became president in 1993.

1990: Al Shackleford and Dan Martin of the Baptist Press, the official news service of the SBC, were fired by the SBC's executive committee. The executive committee gave no reason for their firing; moderates claimed that they were fired for perceived bias against conservatives in their news coverage.

1990: After the SBC had elected 12 straight conservative convention presidents, who then used their position to appoint conservative educators and administrators, a group of moderates broke away in 1990 to form the Cooperative Baptist Fellowship (CBF). Due in part to the perception that Shackleford and Martin were fired for bias against conservative leadership, the CBF formed the Associated Baptist Press (now Baptist News Global) to offer news from the moderate perspective.

1991: At their October meeting, the Foreign Mission Board trustees voted to defund the Baptist Theological Seminary in Rüschlikon, Switzerland.

1992: Keith Parks, under pressure from conservative trustees, retired as president of the Foreign Mission Board. In his 13 years as president, missionaries entered had 40 new countries with a total of 3,918 missionaries. Shortly afterward, he joined the Cooperative Baptist Fellowship as missions director.

1991: Lloyd Elder, president of the Sunday School Board, resigned under pressure and was replaced by former SBC president James T. Draper, a staunch conservative. A total of 159 employees retired (voluntarily or involuntarily) in November 1991.

1993: Mohler was appointed president of Southern Baptist Theological Seminary in 1993 and "hailed as a hero of SBC fundamentalism."

1994: Russell Dilday, president of Southwestern Baptist Theological Seminary in Fort Worth, was fired abruptly. The trustees explained Dilday failed to support the resurgence at the convention and that he held liberal views of the scripture. In a March 22 statement, the faculty claimed that Dilday was an "excellent administrator" who led Southwestern in a "highly effective and successful manner" and "with a spirit of Christlikeness." Dilday, the statement said, also kept the school doctrinally sound.

During his administration, his doctrinal stance was completely consistent with the Baptist Faith and Message statement, which is the seminary's article of faith. The theology faculty affirms Russell H. Dilday for leading the seminary with a spirit of Christlikeness and a desire to be inclusive with regard to the finest theological and biblical perspectives represented in the Southern Baptist Convention. We deeply regret his firing as president of the seminary."

1998: In June, Patterson was elected president of the SBC without opposition. Jerry Falwell, who had criticized Southern Baptists in the days of moderate–liberal rule, attended his first SBC convention as a messenger along with others from his church in Lynchburg, Virginia. The SBC amended the Baptist Faith and Message by adding Article XVIII ("The Family"); it included a complementarian statement about male-priority gender roles in marriage, including an adverbial modifier to the verb "submit": a wife is to "submit herself graciously to the servant leadership of her husband", followed by a lengthy description of a husband's duty to "love his wife unconditionally."

2000: The SBC adopted a revised Baptist Faith and Message, which (for the first time) included statements opposing homosexuality and abortion.

2002: Jerry Rankin and the IMB trustees began requiring missionaries to sign their assent to the 2000 Baptist Faith and Message. Many missionaries resigned, and the requirement was said to "undermine missionary morale."

2004: The Southern Baptist Convention withdrew as a member of the Baptist World Alliance.

== Liberal and moderate reactions ==
In 1987, a group of churches criticized the fundamentalist resurgence for controlling the leadership and founded the Alliance of Baptists. In 1990, another schism occurred in which a group of moderate churches criticized the denomination for the same reasons, as well as opposition to women's ministry, and founded the Cooperative Baptist Fellowship in 1991.

== State conventions react ==
Because each level of Baptist life is autonomous, changes at the national level do not require approval or endorsement by the state conventions or local associations. The majority of state conventions have continued to cooperate with the SBC. However, the state conventions in Texas and Virginia openly challenged the new directions and announced a "dual affiliation" with contributions to both the SBC's Cooperative Program and the CBF.

The Baptist General Convention of Texas (BGCT), the largest of the Southern Baptist state conventions, did not vote in 1998 to align itself with the CBF, despite some reports to the contrary. The BGCT did allow individual churches to designate their missions dollars to a number of different missions organizations, including the SBC and CBF. One of the stated reasons for doing so was their objection to proposed changes in the 2000 revision of the Baptist Faith and Message, which the BGCT said made the document sound like a creed in violation of historic Baptist tradition which opposed their use.

In a reversal from the national convention (where the moderates left and the conservatives stayed), many Texas conservatives formed their own state convention, the Southern Baptists of Texas Convention. Local congregations either disassociated completely from BGCT or sought "dual alignment" with both groups. The BGCT remains the much larger of the two state conventions, and universities such as Baylor only receive money from the BGCT. Similarly, conservative Baptists in Virginia formed the Southern Baptist Conservatives of Virginia.

In Missouri, the Missouri Baptist Convention came under the control of the more conservative group which subsequently attempted to take over the boards of the state's agencies and institutions and reshape them along the theological lines of the current SBC. In 2002, some congregations withdrew and affiliated with a new convention called Baptist General Convention of Missouri. Five of the old Missouri Baptist Convention agencies changed their charters in 2000 and 2001 to elect their own trustees instead of allowing them to be appointed by the Missouri Baptist Convention. Leaders of the Missouri Baptist Convention saw this as a violation of convention bylaws. When the trustees of the agencies refused to settle the matter out of court, the Missouri Baptist Convention filed suit against them. Missouri Baptist University, Missouri Baptist Foundation, The Baptist Home and the Missouri Baptist Children's home all settled individually to be brought back under the control of the Missouri Baptist Convention.

The Virginia and Texas SBC Executive Committees receive and distribute funds from two conventions—one the traditional/original convention (BGAV and BGCT) and one new one that is only SBC (SBCVA and SBCTX). The Missouri SBC Executive Committee declined to receive money from the new more moderate Missouri group. They said it was not in Southern Baptists' best interest to cooperate with another group opposed to the conservative leadership of the Missouri Baptist Convention. Individual churches in the newer convention may contribute to the SBC directly.

== Assessments ==
The American denominational landscape has experienced significant shifts in recent times, but one major story stands out among them all—the massive redirection of the Southern Baptist Convention. America's largest evangelical denomination, the Southern Baptist Convention was reshaped, reformed, and restructured over the last three decades, and at an incredibly high cost.

— Albert Mohler, an architect of the Conservative Resurgence

...the takeover issue was never whether Baptists believed the Bible. The issue is and has always been Creedalism and Fundamentalism. Baptists have always been basically conservative, believing the Bible to be true, trustworthy, and authoritative. There have been individuals who deviated from that mindset but they did not last long among us. They went on to other movements in the Christian family.

— Jimmy R. Allen (President, SBC, 1978-79)

Critics of the takeover faction assert that the "civil war" among Southern Baptists has been about power lust and right-wing secular politics. Dilday has analogized what he calls "the carnage of the past quarter century of denominational strife in our Baptist family" to "friendly fire" where casualties come as a result of the actions of fellow Baptists, not at the hands of the enemy. He writes that "Some of it has been accidental, " but that "some has been intentional." He characterizes the struggle as being "far more serious than a controversy, " but rather a "self-destructive, contentious, one-sided feud that at times took on combative characteristics."

Former president of the SBC Jimmy R. Allen writes that the resurgence/takeover leaders searched for a battle cry to which Baptists would respond. They found it in the fear that we were not "believing the Bible." They focused on the few who interpreted the Bible more liberally and exaggerated that fact. Allen's assessment is that "It was like hunting rabbits with howitzers. They destroyed more than they accomplished."

A spokesman for the new leadership of the SBC, Morris Chapman, claims that the root of the controversy has been about theology. He maintains that the controversy has "returned the Southern Baptist Convention to its historic commitments." Speaking as president of the "new" SBC's executive committee, Chapman cites as examples some of the Conservative Resurgency's claims:

- Baptist colleges and seminaries were producing more liberalism in writing, proclamation, and publication
- The adoption of a hermeneutic of suspicion which elevates human reason above the clear statements of the Bible
- The continued influence of many teachers and leaders who did not hold to a high view of Scripture.

While Patterson believes the controversy has achieved its objective of returning the SBC from an alleged "leftward drift" to a more conservative stance, he admits to having some regrets. Patterson points to vocational disruption, hurt, sorrow, and disrupted friendships as evidence of the price that the controversy has exacted. "Friendships and sometimes family relationships have been marred. Churches have sometimes been damaged even though local church life has proceeded for the most part above the fray and often remains largely oblivious to it. No one seriously confessing the name of Jesus can rejoice in these sorrows", Patterson writes. "I confess that I often second guess my own actions and agonize over those who have suffered on both sides, including my own family."

== Sex abuse and cover up scandals ==
In 2019, after the scandals of sexual abuse accusations involving Pressler and sexual abuse cover-ups involving Patterson, the Southwestern Baptist Theological Seminary removed the stained glass windows depicting the actors of the conservative resurgence, located in the MacGorman Chapel and opened in 2011. Images removed from the chapel included those of Pressler, Patterson, former SBC presidents Charles Stanley, W.A. Criswell, Adrian Rogers, Bailey Smith, Jerry Vines and Ed Young and many others. In March 2023, prominent SBC lawyer Jared Woodfill would also be named as assisting in the abuse cover up as well. By December 2023, seven men accused Pressler of sexually abusing them between 1977 and 2016, with some even accusing him of sexually abusing them when they were underage minors.

== See also ==
- Christian Right
- Fundamentalist–Modernist Controversy
- Moral Majority
- Seminex
