= Girl Defined =

Christian lifestyle blog and YouTube channel

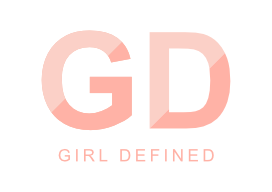
Logo

Girl Defined is a Christian lifestyle blog and YouTube channel run by sisters Bethany Beal and Kristen Clark which focuses on purity culture and navigating mainstream America as an evangelical Christian.

== History ==
Sisters Bethany Beal and Kristen Clark started Girl Defined with a focus on high school and college-aged girls, after their first project, bairdsisters.com, failed to gain traction. In 2016, the sisters began posting videos on YouTube and published their first book, Girl Defined: God's Radical Design for Beauty, Femininity, and Identity.

Girl Defined became the subject of an Internet meme in 2018 after comedy YouTubers Cody Ko and Noel Miller featured Girl Defined's content on their series That's Cringe. This began a trend on social media in which influencers and regular users made videos parodying and mocking Girl Defined.

The sisters started posting on the platform TikTok in the 2020s. In 2021, Beal went viral for sharing her story of having her first kiss at the age of 30 during her wedding.

== Views ==
Girl Defined promotes biblical womanhood. Many of their ideas are borrowed from purity culture which was popular in the 1990s and early 2000s. The organization has been labeled as Christian nationalist by Hope College scholars Sage Mikkelsen and Sarah Kornfield.

=== Feminism ===
Girl Defined has referred to feminism as an "attack on God's design for womanhood". They have stated their intent to build an online community to support women and girls while "taking a stand against feminism".

=== Gender and sexuality ===
The sisters discourage kissing and other sexual or sexually suggestive acts before marriage. They advise girls who are attracted to other girls to "seek God" instead. They also argue that transgender people should renounce "choices" that they have made about their gender.

== See also ==
- Abstinence-only sex education
- Chastity
- Girls Gone Bible
