= Alyssa Grenfell =

American ex-Mormon YouTuber (born 1992)

- Born: October 27, 1992 (age 33); Utah, United States
- Years active: 2023–present

YouTube information
- Channel: Alyssa Grenfell
- Years active: 2023–present
- Genres: Criticism of the Mormon Church; History of Mormonism; Ex-Mormon commentary
- Subscribers: 660 thousand
- Views: 367 million
- Last updated: October 9, 2026
- Website: mormontruths.com

Alyssa Grenfell (born October 27, 1992) is an American author, YouTuber, atheist, and former member of the Church of Jesus Christ of Latter-day Saints (LDS Church). She is best known for her social media content and her memoir How to Leave the Mormon Church: An Exmormon's Guide to Rebuilding After Religion (2023).

== Background ==
Grenfell was born in Utah and also spent time as a child living in Texas and Kentucky. She was raised in a family of LDS Church members and attended Brigham Young University (BYU) to become an English teacher, where she adhered to the church's social and religious guidelines. She married at 23, fulfilling traditional expectations of her upbringing. Grenfell has stated she is a descendant of Sanford Porter, one of the first two hundred Mormon converts, who founded the town of Porterville, Utah.

Grenfell's departure from the LDS Church began in her mid-20s. Key motivations included disillusionment with the church’s teachings on gender roles, marriage, and personal autonomy. Her personal revelations, coupled with historical and cultural critiques of the church, deepened her conviction to leave.

Following her break from the LDS Church at age 23, Grenfell prayed nightly, initially hoping to retain a relationship with God outside the context of Mormonism; she also began attending services at a non-denominational Christian church. She subsequently came to the conclusion that neither God nor any other deity existed and began identifying as an atheist, explaining that she came to "value evidence and data over dogma." Grenfell has cited several reasons she no longer believes in the existence of God. In addition to a general lack of evidence, this includes most people defaulting to the religion of their parents (rather than gravitating en masse to an obviously true faith), the existence of human suffering (particularly that exacerbated by wealth inequality), and the imperfection of the human body (challenging the concept of God as a perfect designer). Grenfell has also rejected the suggestion that she would have found fulfillment in another Christian sect, saying sexism, hierarchism, and the inability to adequately explain why God would disproportionately allow the poor to suffer are common elements across all traditions she researched.

Grenfell moved to New York City in 2017. She mentions having her first son a year after, before ultimately deciding to move to Austin, Texas highlighting negative experiences raising her child in New York City. After publishing her book in 2023, Grenfell started publicly sharing her journey of faith deconstruction on social media platforms such as YouTube and TikTok. She now documents her time as a Mormon on social media, delving into the rules she had to follow and what her day-to-day life looked like.

== Career ==
Her book, How to Leave the Mormon Church: An Exmormon's Guide to Rebuilding After Religion (2023, ISBN 9798989310517), explores her personal journey of leaving the LDS Church and provides guidance for others undergoing similar experiences. It combines memoir-style storytelling with practical advice for navigating life after leaving a high-demand religious community. It also addresses challenges such as redefining relationships, finding a new spiritual identity, and confronting religious trauma.

== Personal life ==
As of April 2025, Grenfell lives in Austin, Texas, with her husband and two sons (born around 2018 and 2022).

== See also ==
- Fundie Fridays
