= Paul Pressler (politician) =

American politician and judge (1930–2024)

- Pressler in 1970

Judge of the 14th Texas Court of Appeals
- In office 1978 – 1992

Judge of the 133rd Judicial District in Harris County
- In office 1970 – 1978

Member of the Texas House of Representatives for Harris County
- In office January 8, 1957 – January 13, 1959
- Preceded by: James Watson Yancy Jr.
- Succeeded by: Roger Daily

Personal details
- Born: Herman Paul Pressler III; June 4, 1930 Houston, Texas, U.S.
- Died: June 7, 2024 (aged 94)
- Party: Republican (after 1982)
- Other political affiliations: Democratic (before 1982)
- Spouse: Nancy Avery (m. 1959)
- Children: 3
- Education: Princeton University (BA); University of Texas at Austin (LLB)
- Known for: Southern Baptist Convention conservative resurgence

Herman Paul Pressler III (June 4, 1930 – June 7, 2024) was an American politician and judge who was a justice of the Texas 14th Circuit Court of Appeals in his native Houston, Texas. Pressler was a key figure in the conservative resurgence of the Southern Baptist Convention, which he initiated in 1978. He was accused of sexual misconduct or assault by at least seven men, some of whom were underage at the time of the alleged activity.

== Early life and education ==
Pressler was born on June 4, 1930, to Elsie Townes Pressler and Herman P. Pressler Jr. His father was a lawyer and director of Humble Oil, eventually becoming the vice president of Exxon after the 1972 renaming that ended the Humble brand. His mother was highly active in Houston cultural and civic life, a fifth-generation Texan from a prominent family who helped found the Baptist church the family attended. He attended The Kinkaid School, later transferring to Phillips Exeter Academy at the age of sixteen. Pressler studied government as an undergraduate student at Princeton University, graduating in 1952. He received his law degree from the University of Texas School of Law.

In 1959, Pressler married Nancy Avery, and they had three children.

== Political career ==
On January 8, 1957, Pressler became Texas State Representative for Harris County, serving until January 13, 1959. He was elected as a Democrat, and remained a member of the party until joining the Republican Party in 1982.

In 1970, Pressler became judge of the 133rd Judicial District in Harris County, until 1978. In 1978, he became judge of the Texas 14th Circuit Court of Appeals in his native Houston, Texas, until 1992.

Pressler was president of the Council for National Policy (CNP), a conservative advocacy group, from 1988 to 1990, and remained a board member until at least 2002. The Southern Poverty Law Center describes the CNP as "a shadowy and intensely secretive group" that "is a key venue where mainstream conservatives and extremists mix".

Anne Nelson's 2019 book, Shadow Network, alleges that after orchestrating the fundamentalist takeover of the SBC, Pressler convinced the senior Republican Party leadership to attempt to use the same methods to establish minority, one-party control of the United States federal government.

== Ministry ==
In the 1960s, Pressler became deacon at Second Baptist Church Houston, and founded a youth group at Bethel Independent Presbyterian Church. In 1967, Pressler and Paige Patterson met in New Orleans to plan a political strategy to elect conservative convention presidents and in turn members of Southern Baptist Convention (SBC) boards.

In 1978, Pressler along with W. A. Criswell, Adrian Rogers and Paige Patterson, met with a group of determined conservative and Republican pastors and laymen at a hotel near the Atlanta airport to launch the resurgence. The Atlanta group determined to elect Rogers, pastor of Bellevue Baptist Church in Memphis, Tennessee, as the first Conservative Resurgence president of the convention.

In the 1980s, Pressler became deacon at Houston's First Baptist Church. He served on the SBC Executive Committee from 1984 to 1991 and on the International Mission Board from 1992 to 2000. In 2004, he was elected vice president of the SBC.

During his time as a leader of the SBC, Pressler was instrumental in pushing its 47,000 churches to adopt literal interpretations of the Bible, strongly denounce LGBTQIA+ acceptance, ban women from preaching, align with the Republican party's political stances and goals, and help members of the GOP get elected into public office.

In 2004, leaders of Houston's First Baptist Church investigated claims that Pressler had groped and undressed a college student at his Houston mansion. Pressler's involvement as a deacon at the church was reduced, but he remained there until around 2007, when he transferred back to Second Baptist Church Houston.

In 2009, Louisiana College in Pineville, Louisiana, announced that its planned law school would be named in Pressler's honor. However, for financial reasons, the project was suspended in 2013.

== Sexual abuse allegations ==
In April 2018, the Houston Chronicle reported that Pressler was accused by Toby Twining and lawyer Brooks Schott of sexual abuse in separate court affidavits. Both men said Pressler molested or solicited them for sex. In the Chronicle report, Toby Twining was a teenager in 1977 when Pressler, a youth pastor at Bethel Church in Houston, grabbed his penis in a sauna at Houston's River Oaks Country Club. The next year, Pressler was ousted from his position after church officials received information about "an alleged incident."

Brooks Schott also stated in an affidavit that he resigned his position at Pressler's former law firm after Pressler invited him to get into a hot tub with him naked. Brooks also accused Jared Woodfill, Pressler's longtime law partner in their firm Woodfill & Pressler LLP, who from 2002 to 2014 was chairman of the Harris County Republican Party, of failing to prevent Pressler's sexual advances toward him and others claiming his indiscretions were well known at the firm. Woodfill provided sworn testimony that he had known of a child sexual abuse allegation against Pressler since 2004.

Woodfill also testified that instead of paying Pressler a salary, their firm would provide personal assistants—mostly young men—to work out of Pressler's River Oaks mansion. Two of these former assistants have gone on to accuse Pressler of sexual assault or abuse.

In 2017, Pressler's former assistant Gareld Duane Rollins Jr. filed a lawsuit claiming he was regularly raped by the conservative leader. Rollins met Pressler in high school and was part of a Bible study Pressler led. Rollins claims he was raped two to three times a month while at Pressler's home. According to the Chronicle, Pressler agreed in 2004 to pay $450,000 to Rollins for physical assault. Southern Baptist leader Paige Patterson is also named in the suit, for helping Pressler cover up the abuse. The SBC settled the Rollins case out of court for an undisclosed sum and the case was dismissed with prejudice on December 28, 2023.

In 2019, after the scandals of sexual abuse accusations involving Pressler and sexual abuse cover-ups involving Paige Patterson, the Southwestern Baptist Theological Seminary removed the stained glass windows depicting the actors of the conservative resurgence, located in the MacGorman Chapel and opened in 2011.

In May 2022, Guidepost Solutions released an independent report stating that Pressler was the defendant in a civil lawsuit alleging that he repeatedly abused the plaintiff beginning when the plaintiff was 14. Two other men submitted affidavits accusing Pressler of sexual abuse.

By December 2023, seven men had accused Pressler of sexually abusing them. Pressler denied the allegations.

== Death ==
Pressler died on June 7, 2024, three days after his 94th birthday. His death was not reported until June 15, the day of his funeral service. No prominent SBC leaders would comment about Pressler's death during the annual SBC conference which was held around the time of his death.

Texas House of Representatives
Preceded by James Watson Yancy Jr.	Texas State Representative for former District 22-6 (Harris County); Herman Paul Pressler III; 1957–1959	Succeeded by Roger Daily
