= Steven Hotze =

Houston-based radio host, physician, and activist

Steven Forrest Hotze
- Born: July 5, 1950 (age 75)
- Education: University of Texas Medical Branch (MD, 1976)
- Occupations: Physician; radio host
- Political party: Republican
- Website: drhotze.com

Steven Forrest Hotze (born 1950) is an American conservative talk radio host, conspiracy theorist, physician, Republican activist and megadonor in Texas.

Hotze is known as a supporter of a variety of right-wing political causes: against protections for LGBT people, against vaccine mandates to fight COVID, and as a proponent of Donald Trump's false claims that he was cheated in the 2020 presidential election. Hotze is under indictment for aggravated assault for his alleged involvement in a voter fraud investigation that resulted in a private investigator attacking and holding an air conditioning repairman at gunpoint.

== Career ==
In 1976, Hotze graduated from the University of Texas Medical School at Houston with his Doctor of Medicine. He promoted a series of claims with no basis in science, including that taking birth control pills made women "less attractive to men" and that "when men lose their testicles to disease or injury, they have difficulty reading a map, performing math problems and making decisions." In December 2020, Vice described Hotze's medical practice as "hawking 'alternative treatments' for postpartum depression, aging, thyroid problems, and even COVID-19". Hotze has promoted various fringe and pseudoscientific medical claims, such as the existence of "yeast hypersensitivity syndrome"; the use of colloidal silver as a cure for various diseases; and the use of non-standard drugs for hypothyroidism. A seller of hormone therapy products, Hotze gained wealth through a chain of "wellness centers" in Texas. He asserted that his line of bioidentical hormones prevented cancer, a claim that lacks scientific support. Hotze has been a practicing physician since at least 2000, and is based in Katy, Texas.

In a 2005 appearance on the CBS Early Show, Hotze advanced his views about thyroid disorders; in a letter to CBS, the American Association of Clinical Endocrinologists criticized Hotze's statements as "completely erroneous and unsubstantiated, and ... readily refuted by a large body of solid scientific evidence." In 2018, an environmental organization filed suit against Hotze's businesses, alleging that some of its consumer products contained undisclosed quantities of lead; that suit is pending.

Hotze published a book, Hormones, Health and Happiness, through an Austin, Texas vanity press.

== Activism ==
Hotze has been involved in right-wing activism since at least 1982. His far-right views have sometimes caused friction with fellow Republicans. He has claimed that malpractice lawsuits are "un-Biblical"; supported Houston mayoral candidate Louie Welch who promoted fighting HIV/AIDS by "shoot[ing] the queers"; and advocated for greater influence of Christianity upon government. A power broker in Texas Republican circles, he is influential among the Texas religious right, and was described by The Texas Tribune in 2020 as "one of most prolific culture warriors on the right in Texas." He has donated to Republican politicians and candidates, including US$12,600 (equivalent to $15,675 in 2025) to U.S. Senator John Cornyn, and is a major ally of Lieutenant Governor Dan Patrick. Hotze aired a program on Patrick's radio station KSEV up until 2011.

In 2013, Hotze brought lawsuits against the Affordable Care Act, asserting that the health-care reform law was unconstitutional; he released two anti-ACA pop-techno music tracks entitled "God Fearing Texans Stop Obamacare" and "Texans Stand Against Obamacare" containing lyrics such as "We will defeat Obama and the socialists" and "Texas should be free again, it should be an independent nation." In 2016, Hotze was a leading supporter of Jared Woodfill's unsuccessful far-right campaign for chairman of the Texas Republican Party.

Hotze has promoted conspiracy theories such as QAnon and has asserted that the COVID-19 pandemic was a "global ritual" to "inject experimental nano bots and chemi-kills into our bodies to alter our DNA using Artificial Intelligence (AI) technology to turn us into zombie-like, controlled masses and weapons of war."

=== Anti-LGBT activism ===
Hotze has opposed homosexuality since at least 1986, once comparing "LGBT people to Nazis and pledg[ing] to drive 'homofascists' from Houston to San Francisco." As of February 2016, Hotze led the Conservative Republicans of Texas; the organization, which describes itself as promoting "constitutional liberties based upon Biblical principles", was designated in 2016 by the Southern Poverty Law Center as an anti-LGBT hate group. Hotze also featured prominently in the defeat of 2015's Houston Equal Rights Ordinance (calling the legislation a "Satanic movement"), and failed in his push for Texas' bathroom bill (2017). In 2016, Hotze likened LGBT people to termites, saying they "eat away at the very moral fabric of the foundation of our country."

The Houston-based Hotze is opposed to the legalization of same-sex marriage. After the U.S. Supreme Court's 2015 decision in Obergefell v. Hodges, Hotze spoke at the kick-off for anti-gay marriage organization Real Marriage: One Man/One Woman for Life, saying of same-sex marriage proponents, "They want to intimidate individuals, churches, schools and families to celebrate those that participate in anal sex. That's what they love and enjoy: anal sex. And that's bad, that's evil. It's a terrible thing to try to do and they want to try to teach it to kids in schools, […] Kids will be encouraged to practice sodomy in kindergarten."

=== COVID-19 pandemic ===
In March 2020, Hotze claimed that coronavirus disease 2019 was an invention of the "deep state" designed to sabotage the presidency of Donald Trump. Hotze later filed least eight lawsuits challenging public health measures adopted by the State of Texas, Harris County, Texas, and the City of Houston to prevent the spread of the virus. In April, he sued Lina Hidalgo, the county judge of Harris County, Texas, for mandating the wearing of face masks. Hotze's request to block the county order was rejected by the court.

In June, he filed suits against Texas Governor Greg Abbott, alleging that contact tracing violated the US Constitution's First Amendment, privacy, Due Process, and Equal Protection provisions, and that the governor's state-wide face mask requirement was unlawful. Hotze also sued Abbott over his executive orders closing nonessential businesses during the pandemic and sued the city of Houston over its decision to bar the Republican Party of Texas from holding an in-person convention at the George R. Brown Convention Center during the pandemic; both of those suits were dismissed.

=== 2020 elections ===
In the 2020 elections, Hotze joined Texas Representative Steve Toth, a Harris County Republican, in attempting to have 127,000 Harris County votes rejected for being cast via drive-thru voting (claiming it to be an unlawful expansion of curbside voting). The Supreme Court of Texas rejected the lawsuit, prompting Hotze and Toth to pursue the claim in federal court. That lawsuit was also rejected.

==== Criminal indictment ====
In August 2020, Hotze founded the nonprofit Liberty Center for God and Country (LCGC), and claimed to have donated $75,000 (equivalent to $93,304 in 2025) to the group. The organization baselessly alleged fraud in the 2020 election, and in the six weeks leading up to the 2020 election, LCGC paid nearly $300,000 (equivalent to $373,216 in 2025) to 20 private investigators to probe what they claimed was "the Democrats' massive election fraud scheme in Harris County"; no evidence supports claims of voter fraud.

Hotze hired Mark Anthony Aguirre as the group's lead investigator; Aguirre had been fired from the Houston Police Department in 2003 after ordering the mass arrest of 300 people in a botched raid on a Kmart parking lot. Aguirre surveilled an ordinary air-conditioner installer/repairman for days, falsely claiming that the man was part of a vast election fraud scheme and was using his cargo truck to carry "750,000 mail-in ballots fraudulently signed by Hispanic children" (the cargo truck was actually carrying tools and air conditioning equipment). According to police and prosecutors, Aguirre surveilled the repairman for four days before, on October 17, 2020, using his SUV to run the repairman off the road. Police and prosecutors state that Aguirre pretended to be injured before pointing a gun at the repairman and ordering the man to get on the ground, while Aguirre directed two of his companions to search the repairman's trunk. Aguirre was paid $266,400 by Hotze's group, with most of that sum ($211,400) being paid the day after the incident with the air conditioning repairman. Aguirre was arrested and charged with aggravated assault with a deadly weapon in December 2020; he pleaded not guilty. He was released on bail on several conditions, including that he not work for Hotze. After his arrest, Hotze called Aguirre "a very good investigator"; described the charges as "bogus"; and expressed his pride in the operation. Hotze also blamed the Republican Party for not doing it themselves.

In April 2021, Hotze attended a fundraiser on behalf of Republican state Attorney General Ken Paxton, as well as businessman Mike Lindell, a prominent Trump ally and 2020 election conspiracy theorist.

In April 2022, Hotze himself was charged in connection with the bizarre 2020 incident with the air conditioning repairman; a Harris County grand jury indicted him on one count of unlawful restraint and one count of aggravated assault with a deadly weapon.

=== George Floyd protests ===
After nationwide protests following the murder of George Floyd reached Texas in early June 2020, Hotze called Governor Abbott's office on June 6 and demanded Texas Army National Guard soldiers be sent to Houston with "the order to shoot to kill if any of these son-of-a-bitch people start rioting like they have in Dallas, start tearing down businesses — shoot to kill the son of a bitches. That's the only way you restore order. Kill 'em. Thank you." When The Texas Tribune obtained and published Hotze's message on July 3, Hotze himself shared it on Facebook. Senator Cornyn called it "absolutely disgusting and reprehensible".
