= Greater Houston Partnership =

Greater Houston Partnership logo

The Greater Houston Partnership (GHP) is a non-profit chamber of commerce focused on economic development across the Greater Houston region. It was formed formed in 1989 in a merger of the Greater Houston Chamber of Commerce, the Houston Economic Development Council and the Houston World Trade Association.

== History ==
The earliest predecessor of the organization was the Houston Chamber of Commerce, founded in 1840 as one of the first two chambers of commerce in Texas.

After Houston's oil-driven economy began to decline in the early 1980s, several of the city's developers petitioned the Greater Houston Chamber of Commerce to more actively market the city to prospective employers. The Houston Economic Development Council was formed in 1984 with $7 million in funds raised by a group of business leaders including the president of Friendswood Development Company (now ExxonMobil) and CEO of Randall's Food Stores. In 1989 the two organizations consolidated with the Houston World Trade Association to form GHP.

In 1990, GHP worked with leaders for the City of Houston to host the Economic Summit of Industrialized Nations. In 1992, the Partnership founded The Center for Houston's Future as a non-profit research organization. The Center for Houston's Future became an independent affiliate of the Greater Houston Partnership in 2000.

In 2014, GHP reIn 2019, the Greater Houston Partnership called for the Texas Education Agency to assign a board of managers to run HISD. The Houston Independent School District takeover began in 2023.

The Partnership’s current Chair is Armando Perez, Executive Vice President, H-E-B Houston.

In December 2023, Kinder Morgan CEO Steven J. Kean became GHP president and CEO, replacing Bob Harvey who had served in the role since 2012.

== Criticism ==
In 2014, the Houston Chronicle criticized Greater Houston Partnership for refusing to comply with an open records request. To avoid disclosing the information requested, GHP chose to instead cancel contracts with the county government, drawing criticism from elected officials such as Harris County Precinct 3 Commissioner Steve Radack.
