= Council for National Policy =

US nonprofit conservative organization

Coordinates: 38°53′45″N 77°00′35″W

- Abbreviation: CNP
- Formation: 1981
- Type: Public policy think tank
- Website: cfnp.org

The Council for National Policy (CNP) is an umbrella organization and networking group that advocates for conservative and Republican Party initiatives in the United States. It was launched in 1981 during the Reagan administration by Tim LaHaye and the Christian right, to "bring more focus and force to conservative advocacy". The membership list for September 2020 was later leaked, showing that members included prominent Republicans and conservatives. Members are instructed not to reveal their membership or even name the group.

The CNP has been described by The New York Times as "a little-known club of a few hundred of the most powerful conservatives in the country", who meet three times yearly behind closed doors at undisclosed locations for a confidential conference. Max Blumenthal has called it a secretive organization that "networks wealthy right-wing donors together with top conservative operatives to plan long-term movement strategy".

== Meetings and membership ==
About the CNP, Marc Ambinder of ABC News said: "The group wants to be the conservative version of the Council on Foreign Relations." The CNP was founded in 1981. Among its founding members were: Tim LaHaye, then the head of the Moral Majority, Nelson Bunker Hunt, T. Cullen Davis, William Cies, Howard Phillips, and Paul Weyrich.

Members of the CNP have included General John Singlaub, shipping magnate J. Peter Grace, Edwin Feulner of The Heritage Foundation, Rev. Pat Robertson of the Christian Broadcasting Network, Jerry Falwell, U.S. Senator Trent Lott, Southern Baptist Convention activists and retired Texas Court of Appeals Judge Paul Pressler, lawyer and paleoconservative activist Michael Peroutka, Reverend Paige Patterson, Senator Don Nickles, former United States Attorneys General Edwin Meese and John Ashcroft, gun-rights activist Larry Pratt, Colonel Oliver North, Steve Bannon, Kellyanne Conway, philanthropist Elsa Prince (mother of Blackwater founder and former CEO Erik Prince and Trump Administration Secretary of Education Betsy Devos), Leonard Leo, Virginia Thomas (wife of Supreme Court Justice Clarence Thomas). Former California State Assemblyman Steve Baldwin was CNP's executive director from 2000 to 2008. Conservative attorney Cleta Mitchell sits on the board of governors for the organization.

Membership is by invitation only. The organization's membership list is considered "strictly confidential". Guests may attend "only with the unanimous approval of the executive committee." Members are instructed not to refer to the organization by name to protect against leaks. The New York Times political writer David D. Kirkpatrick suggested that the organization's secrecy since its founding was intended to insulate it "from what its members considered the liberal bias of the news media." CNP's meetings are closed to the general public to allow for a free-flowing exchange of ideas. The group meets three times per year. This policy is said to be similar to the long-held policy of the Council on Foreign Relations, to which the CNP has at times been compared. CNP's 501(c)(3) tax-exempt status was revoked by the IRS in 1992 on grounds that it was not an organization run for the public benefit. The group successfully challenged this ruling in federal court.

While those involved in the organization are almost entirely from the United States, their organizations and influence cover the globe, both religiously and politically. Members include corporate executives, legislators, former high ranking government officers, leaders of 'think tanks' dedicated to molding society and those whom many view as "Christian leadership".

In May 2016, the Southern Poverty Law Center released a leaked copy of the membership directory for 2014.

A membership list for September 2020, leaked a year later, included Jerome Corsi, Michael Farris, Brigitte Gabriel, Frank Gaffney, Charlie Kirk, Tony Perkins, and Mathew Staver.

== Conferences and political plans ==
Leading members of the CNP voted in a meeting at the Grand America Hotel in Salt Lake City, on September 29, 2007, to consider launching a third party candidate if the 2008 Republican nominee were pro-choice. (The candidacy of former New York City Mayor Rudy Giuliani, who held liberal opinions on social issues such as abortion, gay rights and gun ownership, had disturbed the Christian right.) The CNP's statement read, "If the Republican Party nominates a pro-abortion candidate, we will consider running a third-party candidate." Attending the meeting were notable social conservatives, including James Dobson, Richard Viguerie, Tony Perkins and Morton Blackwell.

CNP has membership links to the Committee for the Free World, whose many other members included, among others, some members of the Unification Church of the United States, some Republican Party leaders, and counter-revolutionaries in Latin America, particularly during the 1980s. Midge Decter served as Executive Director of its committee. Other members included Jeane Kirkpatrick, Leszek Kołakowski, Irving Kristol, Melvin J. Lasky, Seymour M. Lipset, Donald Rumsfeld, Tom Stoppard and George Will. Eugene V. Rostow, then serving as Director of the Arms Control and Disarmament Agency under President Ronald Reagan, was a speaker at a CFW event on Poland.

In his June 1997 speech at a CNP meeting in Montreal, Quebec, then president of the National Citizens' Coalition, Stephen Harper—who later served as the prime minister of Canada from 2006 to 2015—said that the American "conservative movement, is a light and an inspiration to people [of Canada] and across the world."

In 1999, a speech given to the CNP by Republican candidate George W. Bush is credited with helping him gain the support of conservatives in his successful bid for the United States Presidency in 2000. The content of the speech has never been released by the CNP or by Bush.

In February 2007, the organization planned to be involved in the 2008 presidential election campaign and actively sought candidate that would represent their views. U.S. Vice President Dick Cheney and former Massachusetts governor Mitt Romney spoke at a four-day conference that the council held in Salt Lake City, Utah, during the last week of September 2007. The Council for National Policy scheduled a conference in late October 2007; other than Giuliani, most Republican presidential candidates pledged to appear.

On August 21, 2020, U.S. President Donald Trump attended a CNP meeting where he gave a speech.

In an October 14, 2020, Washington Post article, which described the CNP as a "little-known group that has served for decades as a hub for a nationwide network of conservative activists and the donors who support them", one of the attendees of the August 2020 meeting in Arlington, warned of plans by Democrats to "steal this election". He said that, "if they get away with that, what happens? Democracy is finished because they usher in totalitarianism."

== Leadership ==
CNP was founded in 1981 by Southern Baptist pastor Tim LaHaye, author of The Battle for the Mind (1980) and the Left Behind series of books. Other early participants have included W. Cleon Skousen, a theologian within the Church of Jesus Christ of Latter-day Saints and founder of the Freemen Institute; Paul Weyrich; Phyllis Schlafly; Robert Grant; Howard Phillips, a former Republican affiliated with the Constitution Party; Richard Viguerie, the direct-mail specialist; and Morton Blackwell, a Louisiana and Virginia activist who is considered a specialist on the rules of the Republican Party.

The council's first executive director was Woody Jenkins; later, Morton Blackwell and Bob Reccord served in this role. Organization presidents have included Nelson Bunker Hunt of Dallas, Amway co-founder Richard DeVos of Michigan, Pat Robertson of Virginia Beach, retired Judge Paul Pressler of Houston, former Reagan Cabinet secretaries Edwin Meese and Donald Hodel, former Reagan advisor and President of the Intercollegiate Studies Institute Kenneth Cribb, Family Research Council president Tony Perkins, and current President (as of 2014) Stuart Epperson, founder of the Salem Media Group.

== See also ==
- Joe Aguillard
- Gary Aldrich
- John K. Andrews Jr.
- Larry P. Arnn
- Cleta Mitchell
- Lowell C. Smith
- 2020 presidential election and the "Pence Card" scheme
- Ginni Thomas' efforts to overturn the 2020 presidential election
