= Biblical womanhood =

Evangelical Christian movement

Biblical womanhood is a movement within evangelical Christianity, particularly in the United States. It adopts a complementarian or patriarchal view of gender roles, and emphasizes passages such as Titus 2 in describing what Christian women should be like. According to author Rachel Held Evans, it is driven by the conviction that "the virtuous woman serves primarily from the home as a submissive wife, diligent homemaker, and loving mother."

Institutions supporting the movement include Southern Baptist Theological Seminary and Southwestern Baptist Theological Seminary, while organizations associated with the movement include the Council on Biblical Manhood and Womanhood. Notable writers include Nancy Leigh DeMoss, Dorothy Patterson, Elisabeth Elliot, and Priscilla Shirer. Edith Schaeffer's 1971 book, The Hidden Art of Homemaking, has been described as "perhaps unintentionally, a landmark book for proponents of biblical womanhood."

Held Evans suggests that "biblical" is a loaded term, and argues that adherents have "refused to acknowledge" that their interpretation involves a "certain degree of selectivity". Advocates caution that "most women in Third World countries... would find our American, evangelical stereotype of biblical womanhood completely foreign and often simply physically impossible." Some conservative Christian women have critiqued Evans's interpretation for undermining faith in biblical inerrancy.

In 2010, historian Molly Worthen wrote that "'Biblical womanhood' is a tightrope walk between the fiats of old-time religion and the facts of modern culture, and evangelicals themselves do not know where it might lead."

== See also ==
- Women in the Bible
- Stay-at-home daughter
- Girl Defined
- The Making of Biblical Womanhood
