= North Texas Baptist Association =

The North Texas Baptist Association (NTBA) is an association of conservative evangelical Christian churches in the Dallas-Fort Worth Metroplex area.

NTBA was formed in March, 2000 by seven local churches that were aligned with the conservative Southern Baptists of Texas Convention (SBTC), and who wanted to form a local association of churches for regional religious proselytism throughout North Texas.

NTBA is currently headquartered in Lewisville, Texas on the campus of Lakeland Baptist Church, and has friendly cooperation with the Southern Baptist Convention (SBC) and SBTC.

The cooperative efforts of NTBA currently support several mission churches in the DFW area, pregnancy care centers, and various other Christian ministries throughout North Texas. The churches that make up NTBA cooperate for the primary objective of missions while also providing opportunities for continued Christian leadership training.

The NTBA exists to promote fellowship within the member churches and to assist in strengthening those churches in carrying out the Great Commission. They are a multi-cultural association and cooperate according to confessional agreement of the Baptist Faith and Message 2000 and also affirm the Chicago Statement on Biblical Inerrancy.

The founding director was Ed Ethridge and since June 2014 NTBA is led by Richmond Goolsby, Director of Missions.
