= Paige Patterson =

American Baptist minister

L. Paige Patterson

8th President of Southwestern Baptist Theological Seminary
- In office June 24, 2003 – May 23, 2018
- Vice President: Craig Blaising
- Preceded by: Kenneth S. Hemphill
- Succeeded by: Adam W. Greenway

52nd President of the Southern Baptist Convention
- In office 1998 – 2000
- Preceded by: Tom Elliff
- Succeeded by: James Merritt

5th President of Southeastern Baptist Theological Seminary
- In office 1992 – 2003
- Preceded by: Lewis A. Drummond
- Succeeded by: Daniel L. Akin

Personal details
- Born: October 19, 1942 (age 83)
- Spouse: Dorothy Jean née Kelley
- Children: Armour (son) and Carmen (daughter)
- Parent(s): Thomas Armour "T.A." Patterson (father), Roberta M. "Honey" Turner Patterson (mother)
- Education: Hardin-Simmons University; New Orleans Baptist Theological Seminary
- Occupation: Theologian

Leighton Paige Patterson (born October 19, 1942) is a Baptist former administrator from the United States. He served as president of Southeastern Baptist Theological Seminary in Wake Forest, North Carolina, from 1992 to 2003, as president of the Southern Baptist Convention (SBC) from 1998 to 2000, and as the eighth president of the Southwestern Baptist Theological Seminary in Fort Worth, Texas, from 2003 until his firing in 2018 over mishandling of a rape allegation.

He played a major role in the Southern Baptist "conservative resurgence". He has been alternately described as a fundamentalist and a conservative evangelical. He would later be implicated for reportedly covering up sex abuse committed by his prominent career colleague Paul Pressler.

== Education ==
- B.A. – Hardin-Simmons University, Abilene, Texas
- Th.M. – New Orleans Baptist Theological Seminary
- Th.D. – New Orleans Baptist Theological Seminary

== Career ==
Patterson started preaching while still in his teens. He held several pastorates before becoming president of the Criswell Center for Biblical Studies (now Criswell College) in Dallas, Texas, a position from which he was eventually fired. In 1967, Patterson and Houston politician Paul Pressler met in New Orleans, Louisiana and expressed a desire to make the then-largely moderate Southern Baptist Convention more conservative-minded. Patterson formed a strong connection with W.A. Criswell of the First Baptist Church of Dallas while in this position. After 17 years as head of what is now Criswell College, he became president of the Southeastern Baptist Theological Seminary in Wake Forest, North Carolina (1992–2003). Patterson was elected president of the Southern Baptist Convention (SBC) in both 1998 and 1999. He has lectured and preached extensively and authored and edited many books and journals. In 2003, he became the 8th president of Southwestern Baptist Theological Seminary in Fort Worth, Texas. He was removed as president in May 2018 over his past advice to women concerning marital abuse and rape, then stripped of his positions of emeritus president and theologian-in-residence for his handling of several rape investigations. He served on the board of trustees of Cedarville University until he resigned on May 31, 2018.

Paige Patterson (left) with a Southwestern Baptist Theological Seminary student

== Proponent of expository preaching ==
Patterson began preaching as a teenager, and continues to preach in churches and seminaries around the world. He is a strong proponent of expository preaching, once saying, "There is no genuinely good preaching except exposition". He has written on the topic of preaching, including the introduction to the 2010 publication Text-Driven Preaching: God’s Word at the Heart of Every Sermon.

== Role in the SBC conservative resurgence ==
Patterson is best known for his prominent role in the Southern Baptist Convention conservative resurgence starting in 1979 with the election of Adrian Rogers as Convention President. Believing SBC seminaries and other SBC institutions had drifted away from their conservative Biblical roots, Patterson joined with Pressler, who was now a Houston-based judge, to carry out a plan that included exposing the theology taught and practiced by the leadership in SBC institutions, which Patterson and Pressler described as liberal theology. The main issue that divided the SBC was the nature of scripture, particularly, whether or not it is inerrant. Patterson, Pressler, and a host of self-described conservative pastors and laymen began to spread the word that the teaching of SBC leadership was not reflective of their constituents, who were paying their salaries. Patterson and the conservatives won the support of hundreds of like-minded churches, and as many as 40,000 messengers (church members willing to travel to the annual Southern Baptist Convention to vote) by using the inerrancy argument as the issue to gather support.

In 1998, Patterson was elected as president of the Southern Baptist Convention.

Patterson's influence has been felt at all levels of Southern Baptist life. The seminaries have for the most part become conservative institutions. Local churches have been hiring pastors educated at schools led by conservatives. Missionaries have also been influenced by Patterson's leadership. By the time Patterson was appointed president of Southwestern Baptist Theological Seminary in Fort Worth, Texas, in 2003, the conservative leadership required that all faculty sign documents stating their allegiance to Southern Baptist doctrine, most notably, the Baptist Faith and Message.

Patterson has been associated with the Council for National Policy, an umbrella organization and networking group for social conservative activists in the United States.

=== Seminary president ===
Patterson served as the president of Criswell College in Dallas, Texas from 1975 to 1992.

Following his time at Criswell College, Patterson became president of two prominent Southern Baptist seminaries: first Southeastern Baptist Theological Seminary (SEBTS) in Wake Forest, N.C., from 1992 to 2003, and then Southwestern Baptist Theological Seminary (SWBTS) from 2003 to 2018.

== Views on women ==
Patterson has attracted interest because of his stance on the role of women in church and his opposition to ordaining women as ministers. According to Patterson, the "highest and noblest calling of God" for women is that of "mother and grandmother". Additionally, Patterson's interpretation of the Bible includes "an assignment from God, in this case that a woman not be involved in a teaching or ruling capacity over men".

In an interview taped in 2000, Patterson recounted how he counseled a woman, who told him about being abused by her husband, that she should pray for God's intervention. When the woman "came to him later with two black eyes" and said "I hope you're happy", Patterson said he was "very happy" because the next day the husband had come to church for the first time. As reported in The Washington Post, in April 2018 Patterson wrote on the Southwestern Baptist Theological Seminary website that:

"I have also said that I have never recommended or prescribed divorce. How could I as a minister of the Gospel? The Bible makes clear the way in which God views divorce ... I do not apologize for my stand for the family and for seeking to mend a marriage through forgiveness rather than divorce."

Patterson explains a wife's submission to her husband as voluntary rather than coerced: "It means voluntarily to line up in the right order that God has given, and the husband is loving his wife sacrificially as much as Jesus Christ loved the church and gave Himself for it, so that all the husband can think of is, 'Honey, what can I do for you? What can I do to serve you? How can I make your life better?' And all the time she is submitting herself to her husband and saying, 'You just lead and, honey, I'll follow.'" "It depends on the level of abuse, to some degree. … I have never in my ministry counseled anyone to seek a divorce and that's always wrong counsel". Instead of divorce he recommended temporary separation in cases of extreme spousal abuse.

He has also compared female submissiveness to submissiveness to a police officer. Although the officer and Patterson would be equal before God, "He is above me," Patterson wrote. Just as "God gave him an assignment that affects me and made him a minister of God to correct my evil ways," so he believed women should submit to men.

=== Women faculty at SWBTS ===
While Patterson was president of SWBTS, there were two female faculty members in the School of Theology: his wife, Dorothy, and Candi Finch, a loyal ally of the Pattersons.

== Alleged cover up of sex abuse ==
Patterson was a defendant in a 2018 suit which alleged he assisted in covering up sexual abuse by fellow Southern Baptist Paul Pressler. The claims against Patterson were dismissed as they exceeded the statute of limitations. However, on April 6, 2019, in reaction to the abuse cover up allegations, Officials at Southwestern Baptist Theological Seminary in Fort Worth, Texas would remove Patterson's stained glass image, as well as the image of numerous other SBC conservative resurgence leaders, from the MacGorman Chapel, a $30 million building which opened in 2011. In July 2026, the parties in the lawsuit reached a confidential settlement, days before the case was set for trial.

== Removal as president of SWBTS and firing ==
=== From president to president emeritus and theologian-in-residence ===
On May 22, 2018, the board of trustees of Southwestern Baptist Theological Seminary (SWBTS) met to discuss "new leadership for the benefit of the future mission of the Seminary". They removed Patterson as President and conferred the title of President Emeritus upon him, with compensation, and provided for him and his wife to live in the seminary's Baptist Heritage Center as the school's first theologians-in-residence.

=== Fired from all positions at SWBTS ===
However, on May 30, 2018, the seminary's executive committee made an abrupt change:

[N]ew information confirmed this morning was presented regarding the handling of an allegation of sexual abuse against a student during Dr. Paige Patterson’s presidency at another institution and resulting issues connected with statements to the Board of Trustees that are inconsistent with SWBTS’s biblically informed core values.

Patterson was terminated "effective immediately" in response to mishandling the investigation of the alleged rape of a student at Southeastern Baptist Theological Seminary in 2003, based on their internal review reported to SWBTS. During that investigation, Patterson had sent an email "to the Chief of Campus Security in which Dr. Patterson discussed meeting with the student alone so that he could ‘break her down’ and that he preferred no officials be present"; the SWBTS Executive Committee stated that the "attitude expressed by Dr. Patterson in that email is antithetical to the core values of our faith and to SWBTS". The executive committee also found "undeniable" evidence that "contradicts a statement previously provided by Dr. Patterson in response to a direct question by a board member". Patterson has denied any mishandling of any investigation.

The SWBTS Executive Committee removed "all the benefits, rights and privileges provided by the May 22–23 board meeting, including the title of President Emeritus, the invitation to reside at the Baptist Heritage Center as theologian-in-residence and ongoing compensation". The SWBTS trustees voted on October 17, 2018, to uphold the decision to fire Patterson, though 4 of the 34 trustees present voted against and claimed that the process of his firing was flawed. At that same meeting, trustees voted by a similar margin to fire an SWBTS faculty member, apparently for voicing opposition to Patterson's firing.

The firing also led to the termination of Dorothy Patterson's pet project of installing over 60 stained glass windows on the SWBTS campus to honor leaders in the conservative resurgence. The project was begun in 2013 as a 12-year project, and some 32 windows had been installed by April 2019, at which time the trustees decided to remove the windows in the best interests of the seminary. Two of the windows depicted Paige and Dorothy Patterson.

=== Impact beyond SWBTS ===
Patterson's firing affected his standing in Baptist circles more broadly. Since 2003, Patterson had served on the board of trustees of Cedarville University, a Baptist institution. On May 30, 2018, Cedarville's president, Thomas White, who had worked with Patterson at both SEBTS and SWBTS, issued a statement that emphasized Cedarville's policies for reporting abuse and his uncertainty as to whether Patterson would continue to serve on the board. By May 31, 1,300 people had signed a petition for Patterson's resignation from Cedarville's board of trustees, which Patterson submitted that day.

Patterson's standing in the SBC was also affected by his firing. After receiving pressure from various Southern Baptist leaders, including SBC president Steve Gaines, Patterson announced in a letter to Gaines on June 8, 2018, that he was declining to give the keynote sermon at the annual meeting of the SBC the following week. Patterson said his decision came from his desires "to protect my family as much as I can", "to contribute to harmony within the Southern Baptist Convention", and "to respond to the request that has come especially from you and other Southern Baptist leadership".

Although Patterson did not attend the SBC annual meeting in June 2018, the scandal prompted a greater focus on gender for attendees, who passed two resolutions on gender. One of those resolutions affirmed roles for women in the church, while the other condemned all forms of abuse against women and insisted that Baptist leaders report alleged sexual abuse to police.

Patterson is still revered in some Baptist circles. During a chapel service on March 12, 2019, Truett McConnell University (TMU), an SBC school in Georgia, the school's dean and president presented Dr. and Mrs. Patterson with a plaque that renamed TMU's annual spring lecture series after them and claimed that they "provide an exemplary role model of Christian living."

=== Backlash to Patterson's firing ===
About two dozen SBC donors attempted to return Patterson to his positions of president emeritus and theologian-in-residence at SWBTS and to punish those who fired him. At the SBC's annual meeting in June 2018, they brought a resolution to the floor to fire all the trustees of SWBTS who voted to fire Patterson; that resolution was "soundly defeated". Then in early July 2018, several donors to SWBTS signed a public letter threatening to withhold funding from the seminary unless the SWBTS board reconsidered Patterson's firing. Their letter called the SWBTS Executive Committee's firing of Patterson a "travesty" and stated: "Dr. and Mrs. Patterson continue to have our absolute and unwavering support. They are both esteemed scholars and were stately ambassadors for the Seminary". Karen Swallow Prior, then a professor at Liberty University, said, "What we’re seeing is people who are committed to a person rather than to an institution or to the convention, putting their loyalty to a person ahead of their adherence to the principles of the institution".

=== Patterson's public ministry since firing ===
Since his firing, Patterson has received public criticism for two sermons at a revival in September 2018. In the first sermon, he repeatedly highlighted the weight of a "fat" female parishioner, which led to charges that he was "body-shaming women". His second sermon referenced the biblical story of Joseph, who was falsely accused by a woman of sexual abuse, to criticize some women in the Me Too movement. Some Baptists who had previously called for Patterson's removal from SWBTS argued that his sermons showed a lack of repentance for his previous comments about women.

In mid-October 2018, Patterson accepted the opportunity to co-teach an ethics course at Southern Evangelical Seminary (SES). His co-teacher for the course was Richard Land, the former head of the SBC's Ethics & Religious Liberty Commission and presently the president of SES. Richard Mouw, president emeritus of Fuller Theological Seminary, noted that Patterson was an odd choice to teach the class because he was not a specialist in ethics and suggested that Patterson's hire was "a political statement" by the very conservative SES that "He's one of us. We want to keep his voice strong."

In October 2021, Patterson was elected to a three-year term on the board of trustees of Yellowstone Christian College in Kalispell, Montana.

== Lawsuit for handling of rape allegations ==
In May 2019, a former SWBTS student, named "Jane Roe" in legal papers, filed a lawsuit against Paige Patterson for threatening, intimidating, and humiliating her when she told him that she had been repeatedly raped at gunpoint in 2014 and 2015 by another seminary student, named "John Doe". According to the lawsuit, Patterson told Roe to recount "lurid and graphic details" of her rape before a group of men, told her that the rape was a "good thing", and "seemed to enjoy making Roe even more uncomfortable with his questions". Patterson also reportedly said he was "too busy" to deal with the allegations, "callously rejected" her requests for prayers and financial assistance, and told seminary faculty members about the alleged rape without her consent. Doe was expelled after Fort Worth police searched his room and found nine firearms, which violated the seminary's weapon's policy.

The suit claims Roe is the same student about whom Patterson had promised to "break her down". Patterson allegedly later met with Roe and said that Doe has supplied him with nude photos that proved they had a consensual sexual relationship; Roe said the photos were taken while Doe was raping her at gunpoint. When Roe's mother asked Patterson how Doe had been allowed to attend SWBTS with his violent criminal past, Patterson reportedly "lunged across the table, firmly pointed his finger in her face and threatened to 'unleash' lawyers on her if she dared question his leadership".

On April 4, 2023, U.S. District Court Judge Sean D. Jordan dismissed Roe's lawsuit against Patterson and Southwestern Baptist Theological Seminary with prejudice.

== See also ==
- List of Southern Baptist Convention affiliated people
- Southern Baptist Convention
- Southern Baptist Convention Presidents

| Preceded by Tom Elliff | President of the Southern Baptist Convention; 1998–2000 | Succeeded by James Merritt |
