= Nelson Price =

American Baptist pastor (1931–2025)

Nelson Lynn Price (August 24, 1931 – August 30, 2025) was an American Southern Baptist Convention pastor, speaker, and writer.

== Life ==
Price was born in 1931 in Osyka, Mississippi, and was given ten days to live by doctors. He grew up in an agrarian community and gained a degree in horticulture from Southeastern Louisiana University in 1953. He felt a strong compulsion to commit his life to ministry and took a master's degree at New Orleans Baptist Theological Seminary.

He pastored a small church in southern Louisiana for three years, and Oak Park Baptist Church in New Orleans for ten years, before becoming the pastor of Roswell Street Baptist Church in Marietta, Georgia, in 1965.

During his time at Roswell Street, the congregation grew from 700 to around 10,000 members, the church becoming one of the first 'megachurches' in America. He retired from the position in 2000, but continued to preach, serving as an interim pastor and speaker.

Price oversaw a television and radio program called Come Alive, which reportedly reached 20 million homes. He began writing a column for the Marietta Daily Journal in 1966, which lasted for nearly sixty years, as well as authoring books.

He was the first Vice President of the Southern Baptist Convention in 1991, and chairman of the National Fellowship of Christian Athletes Board of Trustees from 1999 to 2005, having been awarded varsity letters in basketball and track from his alma mater, Southeastern Louisiana University. He was also President of the SBC Pastor's Conference, President of the Georgia Baptist Convention, and chairman of the Shorter University Board of Trustees.

His speaking engagements included state and national civic clubs’ conventions, students, NFL, NBA, and college athletic teams. He also preached inaugural messages before Jimmy Carter, and Joe Frank Harris.

He launched a local ministry called Love Life, Inc., overseeing a pro-life pregnancy care center, and The Clay Home, serving as a home for unwed mothers. He also helped launch the Christian radio station at WFTD 1080 AM.

== Personal life ==
He was married to Trudy for seventy years, and they had two daughters, Lynn and Sharon.

== Honours ==
He was named 'Citizen of the Year' by both the Marietta Daily Journal and The Marietta Chamber of Commerce.

The Nelson L. Price Center for Urban Ministries, a dormitory at New Orleans Baptist Theological Seminary for short-term missionaries, was named in honour of Price, and was opened in 2002.

== Other academic achievements ==
He gained honorary doctoral degrees from Mercer University in 1984 and Hannibal-LaGrange College in 1990.

== Death ==
Price died on August 30, 2025, aged 94.

== Books ==
- Shadows we run from - 1975
- I've got to play on their court - 1975
- How to find out who you are - 1977
- The Occult Is Lion Country - 1978
- Supreme Happiness - 1979
- Only the Beginning - 1980
- The destruction of death - 1982
- Tenderness and 24 other ways to make a marriage work - 1986
- New Age, the Occult, and Lion Country - 1989
- Backstage at the Church - 2004
- The Chronicles of Nicodemus - 2008
- Heaven: Earth’s Ultimate Mystery - 2014
- Prayer: Closet Power - 2014
- Servants Not Celebrities - 2014
- Backstage at the Manger: The Story of Christ’s Birth - 2014
- The Apostles - 2014
- Plodders: The Improbables Doing the Incredible - 2014
- The Emmanuel Factor - 2015
- Called to Splendor - 2015
- Farewell to Fear - 2015
- Prelude People - 2016
- Uplifted: A Journey Through Acts - 2025
