= Fundie Fridays =

YouTube channel

Instagram information
- Page: fundiefridays
- Years active: 2019–present
- Followers: 58.6 thousand

TikTok information
- Page: @fundiefridays
- Followers: 72 thousand

YouTube information
- Channel: Fundie Fridays
- Years active: 2019–present
- Genre: Commentary
- Subscribers: 421 thousand
- Views: 67.9 million
- Last updated: August 10, 2026
- Website: fundiefridays.net

Fundie Fridays is a YouTube commentary channel focusing on Christian fundamentalism, American conservative politics, and queer issues hosted by couple Jen and James Bryant. They have produced videos about a variety of religious and political figures.

== Channel history ==
Jennifer Bryant (née Sutphin), known by fans as Jen, created Fundie Fridays in July 2019, a YouTube commentary channel in which she applied makeup while discussing Christian fundamentalism. In 2021, a video essay about conservative influencer Abby Shapiro titled "The curious case of 'Classically' Abby Shapiro", garnered a substantial increase in subscribers allowing Jen to quit her job to become a full-time content creator. Jen's husband, James, began making appearances in videos to provide political explanations and commentary during this time period.

The channel has a fan following that call themselves "Jennonites" in reference to the Anabaptist denomination of Mennonites and James is referred to as "King James" by fans. Many of their subscribers are also part of "fundie snark" subreddits. Religion News Service described Fundie Fridays as a "subculture within a subculture". According to Vox magazine, another part of Fundie Fridays audience are people who are "deconstructing" their religious beliefs.

Jen is also known for her participation in the documentary Shiny Happy People: Duggar Family Secrets, a 2023 documentary about the Duggar family and the Institute in Basic Life Principles (IBLP). The channel's most watched video at the time was a video essay about the Duggars, which had 3 million views. In 2022, Fundie Fridays continued their coverage of the Duggars with Josh Duggar's criminal trial.

=== Bates copyright claims ===
From June 18 to June 24, 2022, Fundie Fridays received multiple copyright strikes from Lawson Bates, who had been covered in 3 different videos on the channel, leading to the channel being marked for deletion. The first video, posted in February 2022, was a parody cover of Bates' song "Like the Rain". The video was removed by YouTube in June 2022 after Bates made the claim. After the first video was claimed, Bates again claimed another Fundie Fridays video in which the Bryants covered Bringing Up Bates and the history of the Bates family. The third strike occurred three days after the second on a video about Duck Dynasty. In this video, a clip of Bates' song "Past the Past" starring Sadie Robertson was shown. A writer for Paste Magazine considered the filed claims to be retaliatory and as part of a larger trend of public figures attempting to silence criticism. The Bryants filed a counterclaim in which they claimed that their content qualified as fair use, parody, and commentary. Following the counterclaim, the strikes were dropped and the channel was reinstated.

== Background ==
The Bryants are from Columbia, Missouri and are not religiously affiliated. Both Jen and James were raised in the Bible Belt but did not have religious upbringings. Jen identifies as an atheist. James worked in social work prior to becoming a full-time content creator in 2022.

== See also ==
- Faith deconstruction – process during which believers reexamine and question their beliefs
- Alyssa Grenfell – Author, content creator, and former member of The Church of Jesus Christ of Latter-day Saints
- Snark subreddits – Subreddits dedicated to gossip about public figures
