= Soul competency =

Baptist theological view

Soul competency is a Christian theological perspective on the accountability of each person before God. According to the view, one's family relationships, church membership, or ecclesiastical or religious authorities cannot affect the salvation of one's soul from damnation. Instead, each person is responsible to God for one's own personal faith in Jesus Christ and his death and resurrection.

== Baptist view ==
The basic concept of individual soul liberty, is that in matters of religion, each person has the liberty to choose what conscience or soul dictates is right, and is responsible to no one but God for the decision that is made.

A person may then choose to be a Baptist, a member of another Christian denomination, an adherent to another world religion, or to choose no religious belief system, and the church, the government, family and friends may not make the decision or compel the person to choose otherwise. In addition, a person may change one's mind over time.

According to Francis Wayland, president of Brown University (1827–1855), the Puritan minister Roger Williams established the Colony of Rhode Island and Providence Plantations on the fundamental principle of "perfect freedom in religious concerns; or, as he designated it, "SOUL LIBERTY".^{[a]}

In line with soul competency, the Southern Baptist Convention has no official creed. They, however, have the Baptist Faith and Message, a statement of "generally held convictions."

== Notes ==
^{a} Wayland states further "No man of his age had so clear conceptions of the rights of conscience as the founder of Rhode Island, and no one had ever carried them so honestly to their legitimate conclusions. I go further: no one has yet been able either to take from or add to the principles of religious liberty which he so simply and powerfully set forth. They stand as imperishable monuments to his fame, like the obelisks of Luxor, on which the chiseling of every figure is now just as sharply defined as when, three thousand years since, they were left by the hand of their designer."
