= Baptist Faith and Message =

Statement of faith of the Southern Baptist Convention

The Baptist Faith and Message (BF&M) is the statement of faith of the Southern Baptist Convention (SBC). It summarizes key Southern Baptist thought in the areas of the Bible and its authority, the nature of God as expressed by the Trinity, the spiritual condition of man, God's plan of grace and salvation, the purpose of the local church, ordinances, evangelism, Christian education, interaction with society, religious liberty, and the family. The current version of the BF&M is the version revised in 2000 and amended in 2023.

== History ==
The old Triennial Convention, from which the Southern Baptist Convention split, had adopted both the Philadelphia Confession of Faith of 1742 and the New Hampshire Confession of Faith of 1833 as confessions of faith but did not require local churches to subscribe to either. Although the SBC was organized in 1845, no formal confession of faith was adopted until Baptist theologian Edgar Young Mullins led the denomination to adopt the original BF&M in 1925. Described as "the New Hampshire Confession of Faith [of 1833], revised at certain points, and with some additional articles growing out of present needs," it was intended as "a reaffirmation of Christian fundamentals," which was deemed necessary because of "the prevalence of naturalism in the modern teaching and preaching of religion."

The BF&M was revised in 1963 by a committee under the chairmanship of Herschel H. Hobbs. The committee stated in its preamble that the revised BF&M "has sought to build upon the structure of the 1925 Statement, keeping in mind the 'certain needs' of our generation.... A living faith must experience a growing understanding of truth and must be continually interpreted and related to the needs of each new generation." The committee further stated that "[i]n no case has [the revised BF&M] sought to delete from or to add to the basic contents of the 1925 Statement." The preamble to the BF&M 2000 stated that the revisions in 1963 were adopted to respond "to assaults upon the authority and truthfulness of the Bible." The 1963 BF&M was then amended in 1998 by the addition of Article XVIII on "The Family." The preamble to the BF&M 2000 stated that this article was adopted to "answer[] cultural confusion with the clear teachings of Scripture."

The BF&M was again revised in 2000 by a committee under the chairmanship of former SBC president Adrian Rogers. At the SBC annual meeting in 1999, a motion was made to appoint a committee to revise the BF&M. Then-SBC-president Paige Patterson appointed a fifteen-member committee, some of its membership including Steve Gaines, Charles S. Kelley, Richard D. Land, Fred Luter, Albert Mohler, Nelson Price, Adrian Rogers, and Jerry Vines. The 2000 revisions incorporated sociological as well as theological changes and were considered the most controversial. In its preamble, the committee stated, "Now, faced with a culture hostile to the very notion of truth, this generation of Baptists must claim anew the eternal truths of the Christian faith."

On June 14, 2023, at the annual meeting of the SBC in New Orleans, Louisiana, an unexpected motion was made by Jared Cornutt, a pastor from Birmingham, Alabama, to amend Article VI, "The Church," by slightly changing the language relating to the two ecclesial offices. The amendment sought to clarify that the definitions of the biblical terms "pastor," "elder," and "overseer" were equivalent under the BF&M. The changes were as follows (additions underlined):

In such a congregation each member is responsible and accountable to Christ as Lord. Its two scriptural ~~officers~~ offices are ~~pastors and deacons~~ that of pastor/elder/overseer and deacon. While both men and women are gifted for service in the church, the office of ~~pastor~~ pastor/elder/overseer is limited to men as qualified by Scripture.

== Position Statements ==
The BF&M 2000 includes 18 topics which are position statements of the SBC. Each article or position is followed by Scripture references which are used to support the SBC's stated position. (Note: The official SBC website, when referencing the Bible, uses the Christian Standard Bible translation, which is published by LifeWay Christian Resources, an extension of the SBC.)

| I. | The Scriptures |
| II. | God |
| | A. God the Father |
| | B. God the Son |
| | C. God the Holy Spirit |
| III. | Man |
| IV. | Salvation |
| V. | God's Purpose of Grace |
| VI. | The Church |
| VII. | Baptism and the Lord's Supper |
| VIII. | The Lord's Day |
| IX. | The Kingdom |
| X. | Last Things |
| XI. | Evangelism and Missions |
| XII. | Education |
| XIII. | Stewardship |
| XIV. | Cooperation |
| XV. | The Christian and the Social Order |
| XVI. | Peace and War |
| XVII | Religious Liberty |
| XVIII. | The Family |

== Reception ==
The significant changes to the BF&M in the 2000 revision were praised and criticized.

=== Affirmations ===
Some of the changes that were particularly well received by some Baptist theologians include the following:

- The controversial use of the word "inerrancy" was not inserted into the section on scripture. Some were concerned that it would be included.
- No inclusion of more restrictive views of eschatology, such as dispensationalism. Apprehension had been expressed that such views might be espoused in the revisions.
- Inclusion of a statement that Baptists honor the principles of soul competency and the priesthood of all believers.
- Reaffirmation of most historical Baptist convictions.
- Addresses issues of contemporary concern—soteriological inclusivism (Section IV), family (Section XVIII), gender (Section III), sexual immorality, adultery, homosexuality, pornography, and abortion (Section XV).
- Clear expressions about the future direction of the SBC under the "conservative resurgency" leadership.
- Editorial changes, such as the use of gender-inclusive language, considered improvements in the form of the statement.

=== Criticisms ===
In 2001, Russell H. Dilday of the Center for Baptist Studies at Mercer University raised 12 controversial points about the 2000 revision. The most contentious points were in the areas of male priority (in marriage and in ministry, specifically the pastorate), the exegetical standard by which the Bible is to be interpreted, and a catalogue of specific sins.

==== Gender-based roles ====
For the first time in SBC history, provisions were added to define male-headship gender roles in ministry and marriage. Regarding ministry, the BF&M now explicitly defines the pastoral office as the exclusive domain of men—thus prohibiting female pastors. While not stated in the BF&M 2000, some churches also apply this interpretation to deacons and will not ordain women or allow them to serve as deacons. (Note: Traditional Southern Baptist churches generally do not have elders; therefore, the issue of women elders is not generally an issue within those congregations. However, for more contemporary churches which have elders, the interpretation was extended to this office as well with an amendment in 2023, thus prohibiting women from being elders. See the History section above.)

Article VI. The Church. While both men and women are gifted for service in the church, the office of pastor/elder/overseer is limited to men as qualified by Scripture.

Regarding marriage, the BF&M added Article XVIII to specify that the husband is the head of the household (though this is to be understood in a complementarian role, not as an autocrat). Nothing in the BF&M prohibits or discourages the wife from holding outside employment or the husband from performing household duties traditionally considered those of the wife.

Article XVIII. The Family. The husband and wife are of equal worth before God, since both are created in God's image. The marriage relationship models the way God relates to his people. A husband is to love his wife as Christ loved the church. He has the God-given responsibility to provide for, to protect, and to lead his family. A wife is to submit herself graciously to the servant leadership of her husband even as the church willingly submits to the headship of Christ. She, being in the image of God as is her husband and thus equal to him, has the God-given responsibility to respect her husband and to serve as his helper in managing the household and nurturing the next generation.

==== Exegetical standard ====
The 2000 revision removed the assertion that the person of Jesus was to be the exegetical standard by which the Bible was to be interpreted, (Note: The text of the original assertion, which was the last sentence in the section, was: "The criterion by which the Bible is to be interpreted is Jesus Christ.") and replaced it with the last sentence in the quotation below. The change was made over concerns that some groups were elevating the recorded words of Jesus (Note: Those words are commonly referred to as the "red letter words", based on the 20th-century use of such in Bible printing.) in Scripture over other Scriptural passages (or, in some cases, claiming that Jesus' silence on an issue held priority over other passages explicitly discussing a topic, an example being homosexuality). The traditional SBC view is that all Scripture is equally inspired by God.

Article I. The Scriptures. The Holy Bible was written by men divinely inspired and is God's revelation of Himself to man. It is a perfect treasure of divine instruction. It has God for its author, salvation for its end, and truth, without any mixture of error, for its matter. Therefore, all Scripture is totally true and trustworthy. It reveals the principles by which God judges us, and therefore is, and will remain to the end of the world, the true center of Christian union, and the supreme standard by which all human conduct, creeds, and religious opinions should be tried. All Scripture is a testimony to Christ, who is Himself the focus of divine revelation.

This revision was particularly objectionable to the Baptist General Convention of Texas, the largest SBC state convention, which had previously split between moderates and conservatives, with the latter forming the Southern Baptists of Texas Convention.

==== Catalogue of specific sins ====
The 2000 BF&M has been criticized for including a specific list of contemporary sins, which could lead to endless additions.

== Continued Use of 1963 Version ==
Several Baptist entities continue to use the Baptist Faith and Message of 1963 as a faith statement. They include the Baptist General Convention of Texas, Samford University, and some individual churches.

== See also ==
- List of Baptist confessions
