= Stay-at-home daughter =

Christian biblical womanhood movement

The stay-at-home daughter (SAHD) movement is a subset of the biblical patriarchy and biblical womanhood movements, particularly within the United States and New Zealand. Adherents believe that "daughters should never leave the covering of their fathers until and unless they are married." This means preparing to be a wife and mother, eschewing education outside the home and a career, and according to Sarah Stankorb writing for Marie Claire, "complete subservience to their father". For most stay-at-home daughters it involves a focus on the "domestic arts" such as cooking, cleaning and sewing. Julie Ingersoll suggests that the purpose of stay-at-home daughters is to "learn to assist their future husbands as helpmeets in their exercise of dominion by practicing that role in their relationship with their father."

The term stay-at-home daughter was popularized by Doug Phillips and his Vision Forum ministry, which shut down operations after his confession of marital infidelity and allegations of sexual abuse.

The key pioneers of this movement are the Botkin sisters, Anna Sofia and Elizabeth, who in 2005 wrote So Much More: The Remarkable Influence of Visionary Daughters on the Kingdom of God. In 2026 they wrote an article apologizing for the book and stating that "We re-read it, almost two decades later, with better hermeneutics and a better understanding of church history and historic theology, and realized our entire case was exegetically hollow."
