= James Merritt (minister) =

American pastor (born 1952)

James Merritt (born December 22, 1952) is a U.S. religious leader and was president of the Southern Baptist Convention from 2000 to 2002.

== Biography ==
James G. Merritt is the senior pastor of Cross Pointe Church. He was born and raised in Oakwood, Georgia and surrendered his life to Christ as a 9-year-old boy. At age 21, he committed to full-time Christian ministry, and went on to pastor five churches. He has preached around the world to hundreds of thousands of people through television and radio.

As a popular Bible teacher, James has been interviewed by media outlets including 60 Minutes, The New York Times, ABC World News Tonight, Time Magazine, and Hannity and Colmes. Each week, Merritt's messages are broadcast in all 50 states and 122 countries around the world through Touching Lives, a television and media ministry.

Merritt earned his bachelor's degree from Stetson University and his Master of Divinity degree and Doctor of Philosophy degree from the Southern Baptist Theological Seminary in Louisville, Kentucky. He has published several books including Friends, Foes and Fools, and How to Be a Winner and Influence Anybody, with Broadman and Holman publishers. His heart for pastors has also resulted in PastorsEdge.com, a ministry resource and PastorsEdge Mentoring Conferences.

== Family ==
Merritt has been married to his wife, Teresa, for over 40 years and they have three sons and five grandchildren.

== See also ==
- List of Southern Baptist Convention affiliated people
- Southern Baptist Convention
- Southern Baptist Convention Presidents

Preceded by Paige Patterson	President of the Southern Baptist Convention; 2000–2002	Succeeded by Jack Graham
