= Fellowship Church =

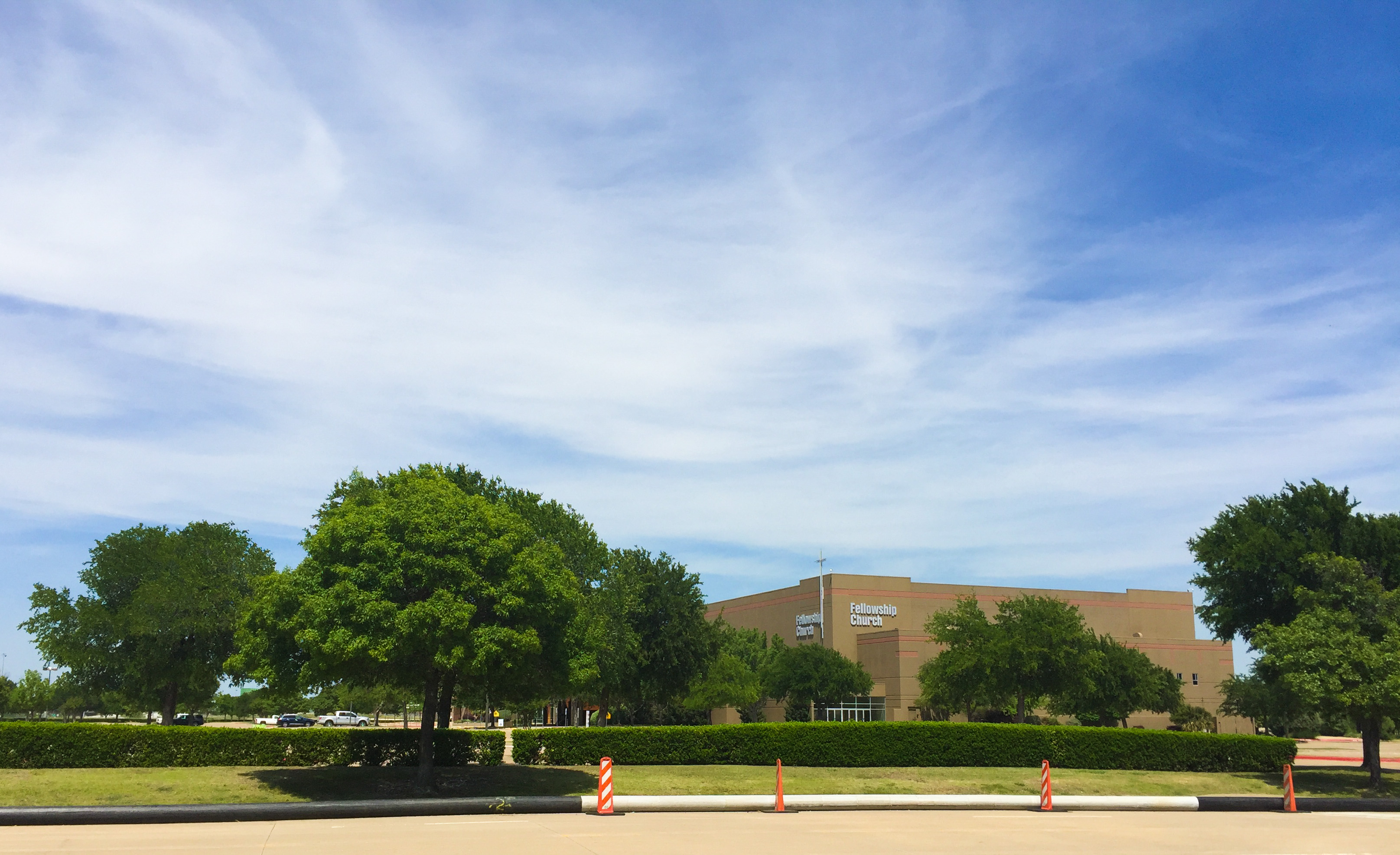
- Fellowship Church in Grapevine
- Fellowship Church
- Location: Grapevine, Texas
- Country: United States
- Denomination: Baptist
- Website: fellowshipchurch.com

History
- Founded: 1989
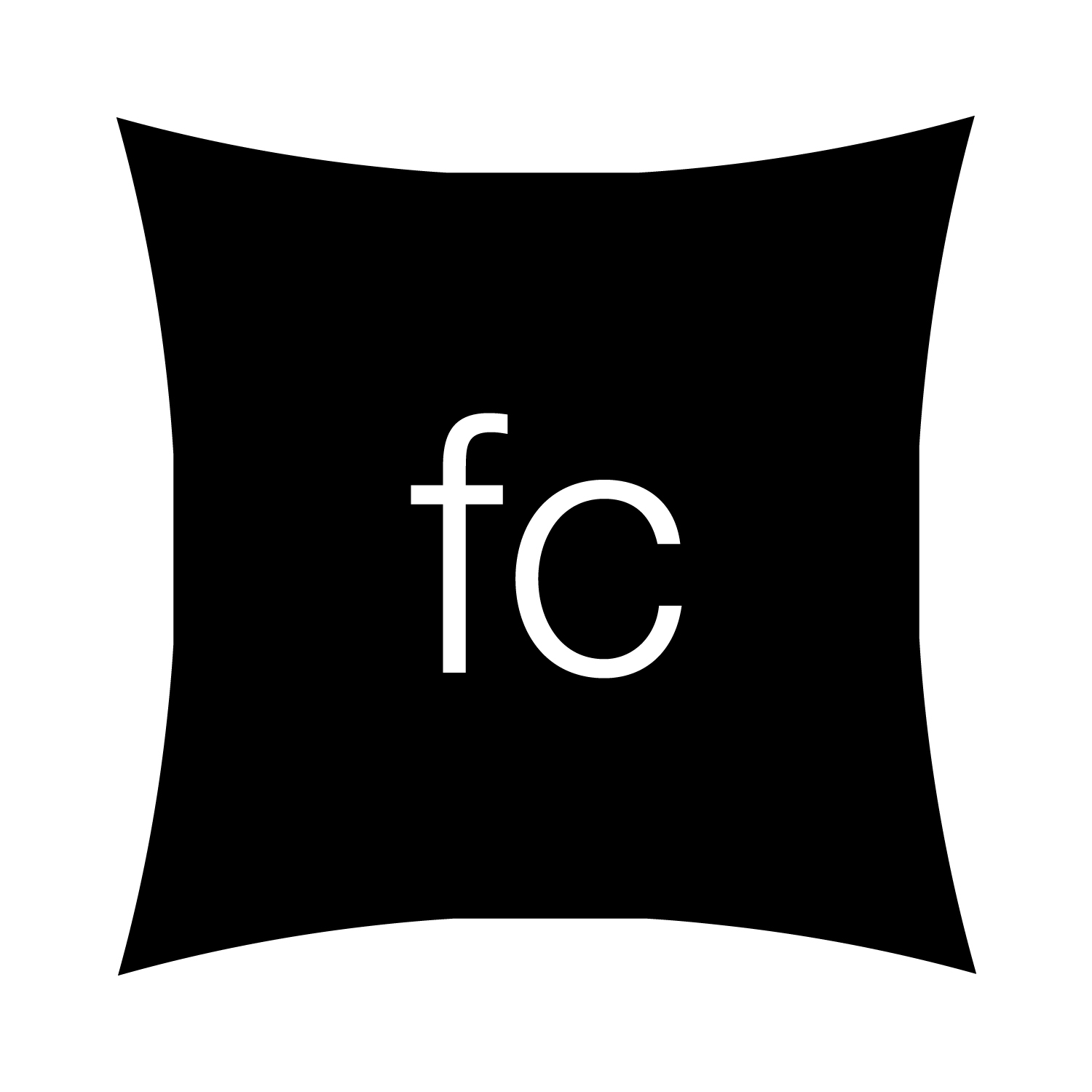

Fellowship Church (FC) is Baptist Evangelical multi-site megachurch based in Grapevine, Texas, a suburb of Fort Worth. It is affiliated with the Southern Baptist Convention. Its senior pastors are Ed Young and Lisa Young.

== History ==
FC started in 1989 as a mission church of the First Baptist Church of Irving, Texas, and was initially known as "Fellowship of Las Colinas". Approximately 150 members of First Baptist Irving relocated to the new church. FC initially met in a rented facility next to the Irving Arts Center and across from MacArthur High School.

In April 1998, FC moved to its current facility and adopted its present name.

In 2018, the church held a professional wrestling event. In November 2018, CBS News listed Fellowship Church as the sixth largest megachurch in the United States with about 24,162 weekly visitors.

In 2020, the weekly attendance was 24,162.

== Satellite locations ==
In early 2005, FC opened two satellite campuses, Fellowship Church Plano (which met at a church-owned facility in Plano, Texas) and Fellowship Church Uptown (which met at North Dallas High School). Fellowship Church Uptown was renamed to Fellowship Church Downtown after it moved to a church-owned facility in Downtown Dallas.

Later in 2005, a third satellite campus was added, Fellowship Church Alliance (which met at Northwest High School in Justin, Texas). In October 2007 the campus relocated to in a new facility west of downtown Fort Worth, near the museum district, was renamed Fellowship Church Fort Worth.

In 2006 FC opened a fourth campus and its first outside the DFW area, Fellowship Church Miami in South Miami. South Miami Campus has been closed as of March 2021. Property taken over by Vous Church.

In 2008, FC opened Allaso Ranch camp and retreat center in Hawkins, Texas, which also hosts a satellite weekend service.

In 2012, FC added an internet campus called Fellowship Live at FellowshipLive.com.

In 2017, South Biscayne Church in North Port, Florida became part of the FC family. In January 2022, the satellite location in FL was sold to another church, Foundation Church of Englewood. The next two weeks after the notice were the final weeks as Fellowship Church South Biscayne.

In 2018, the FC Celina/Prosper campus relocated and is now in Frisco, TX.

In 2018, FC purchased Journey Church in Norman, Oklahoma.

All satellite campuses act as extensions of FC; though they have live music and their own staff, all sermons are broadcast from the Grapevine campus.

== Programs ==
Fellowship Church is the location for Ed Young's annual leadership conference, the C3 Conference, also known as the Creative Church Culture Conference.

In September 2007, FC launched a website, ineed2change.com, in conjunction with a sermon series of the same name.

== Controversies ==
In 2010, Pastor Ed Young was criticized for his luxurious lifestyle, including the purchase of a Falcon 50 private jet, an annual housing allowance of $240,000 per year, and an annual salary of $1 million.
