= Jared Woodfill =

American lawyer

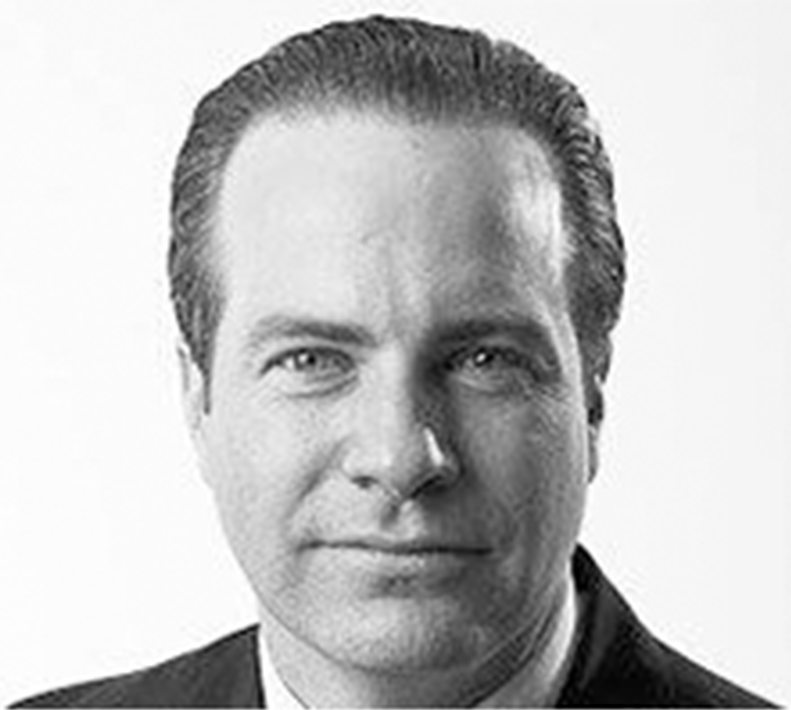
- Woodfill in 2020

Chairman of the Republican Party of Harris County (Houston), Texas
- In office 2002–2014
- Preceded by: Gary M. Polland
- Succeeded by: Paul Simpson

Personal details
- Born: Jared Ryker Woodfill V Houston, Texas, United States
- Education: Clear Lake High School University of Texas at Austin St. Mary's University School of Law
- Occupation: Lawyer

Jared Ryker Woodfill V is a Texas lawyer and political figure who was chairman of the Harris County Republican Party from 2002 to 2014. He was elected chairman of the county party for six two-year terms. After being ousted from the chairmanship of the county party in 2014, Woodfill launched two unsuccessful campaigns for the chairmanship of the Texas Republican Party. Woodfill is known for his socially conservative views and activism, including his opposition to the Houston Equal Rights Ordinance, which was repealed in a 2015 referendum.

== Early life and education ==
Woodfill graduated from Clear Lake High School, the University of Texas at Austin, and St. Mary's University School of Law.

== Legal career ==
Woodfill was formerly affiliated with the law firm Woodfill and Pressler, LLP; his law partner, Paul Pressler, was formerly a state judge and prominent leader in the Southern Baptist Convention.

=== Role in Pressler scandal ===
Woodfill represented Pressler in a suit alleging inappropriate sexual conduct; the case settled in 2004 for $450,000. Pressler did little legal work for the firm, but had valuable political connections. Pressler was subsequently sued by a former member of a church youth group, who accused Pressler of raping him, beginning when he was 14 years old. Seven men ultimately accused Pressler of sexual misconduct. In 2023, Woodfill gave a deposition in the suit; he acknowledged that he was told in 2004 that Pressler had sexually abused a minor. Despite this, Woodfill continued his association with Pressler for nearly a decade more; they remained law partners until approximately 2012, when (according to Woodfill) Pressler retired and the firm was renamed the Woodfill Law Firm. Woodfill also testified that, in lieu of a salary, the law firm provided Pressler with a series of personal assistants, mostly young men who worked out of Pressler's home, two of whom also later accused him of sexual assault or misconduct. Woodfill continued to provide Pressler with youthful assistants until at least 2017. In 2016, a 25-year-old attorney at the firm, in an email to Woodfill, detailed sexual harassment that he said Pressler had subjected him to; the attorney resigned from the firm in May 2017, and accused Woodfill of failing to control Pressler's conduct. Woodfill's sworn statement in the deposition in 2023 contradicted his previous claims, since at least 2016, that he had no knowledge of sexual misconduct by Pressler targeting boys and young men.

=== Legal practice ===
Separately, in September 2018, the State Bar of Texas publicly reprimanded Woodfill, and ordered him to pay $3,490 in fees and expenses. The Bar determined that "Woodfill had direct supervisory authority over members of his firm who violated the disciplinary rules during the representation in a divorce, and Woodfill failed to take reasonable action."

Separately, in 2018, the Harris County District Attorney's Office investigated Woodfill in connection with allegations of two of his clients who accused him of misappropriating funds from client trust accounts. Woodfill's office was searched in November 2018 as part of the investigation. However, District Attorney Kim Ogg abruptly dropped the case, bringing no charges against Woodfill.

In 2024, one of the clients who alleged that Woodfill misappropriated her funds asked federal prosecutors to re-open the fraud case against him; the former client argued that Ogg had mishandled the investigation.

== Republican Party politics ==
=== Harris County Republican Party chairman, 2002 to 2014 ===
Woodfill was the chairman of the Harris County Republican Party from 2002 to 2014. During his twelve years as chair, Woodfill focused on socially conservative causes; this emphasis, as well as Woodfill's management style, was controversial within the county party. Woodfill ran unopposed for reelection until 2010, when he was challenged by three others in an election focusing on allegations of fiscal mismanagement and "a blame game" over Republican losses in Harris County in the 2008 elections. Woodfill won reelection in 2010, but four years later was ousted from the chairmanship by engineer-turned-lawyer Paul Simpson, who heavily outspent Woodfill. Woodfill was endorsed by many Texas Republicans on the right wing, including Dan Patrick.

=== Subsequent activities ===
==== Anti-LGBT rights activism ====
Woodfill has been at the forefront of anti-LGBT movements in Houston and Texas. In 2015, Woodfill was a leading opponent of the Houston Equal Rights Ordinance (HERO) championed by Houston Mayor Annise Parker. The antidiscrimination ordinance prohibited "discrimination in city employment and city services, city contracts, public accommodations, private employment, and housing based on an individual's sex, race, color, ethnicity, national origin, age, familial status, marital status, military status, religion, disability, sexual orientation, genetic information, gender identity, or pregnancy." Woodfill opposed the prohibition against LGBT discrimination and worked to get a proposition challenging the ordinance onto the ballot. During the campaign, Woodfill and Steven Hotze likened gay people to Nazis and pushed the LGBT grooming conspiracy theory. In November 2015, Houston voters repealed the ordinance; Parker said that the campaign against the ordinance was based on "fear-mongering and deliberate lies."

In 2017, as editor-in-chief of the group Conservative Republicans of Texas, Woodfill endorsed State Senator Lois Kolkhorst's "bathroom bill" and criticized Joe Straus, the Republican Speaker of the Texas House of Representatives, for not advancing the legislation.

In 2019, Woodfill represented two plaintiffs who filed an unsuccessful lawsuit seeking to block the City of Houston from extending spousal benefits to the same-sex spouses of city employees.

==== Unsuccessful campaign for Texas Republican Party chairmanship ====
In 2015, after Texas Republican Party chairman Steve Munisteri stepped down, Woodfill unsuccessfully sought to fill the vacancy. In secret balloting among 62 party officials in March 2015, Tom Mechler of Amarillo, an oil and gas consultant, decisively won on the second ballot, defeating Dallas County Republican Party chair Wade Emmert by one vote; Woodfill came in third place, and Republican National Committeeman Robin Armstrong in last place. In 2016, Woodfill unsuccessfully challenged Mechler in a rematch for a full term as chairman of the Texas Republican Party; Woodfill ran a far-right campaign, with Steven Hotze as one of his leading supporters. During the campaign, Woodfill criticized Mechler as being insufficiently vocal on conservative issues, while Mechler criticized Woodfill's tenure at the head of the Harris County party organization and said Woodfill, if elected, would institute "purity tests" that would damage Republicans and help Democrats. Woodfill withdrew at the state party convention after Republican delegates from 27 of the 31 state Senate districts supported Mechler's retention; Woodfill declared his own backing of Mechler, who was declared elected by a unanimous vote.

==== 2020 election lawsuit ====
During the 2020 election, Woodfill represented Republican and conservative activists who sued Harris County, Texas, in an attempt to block the use of drive-through voting in Harris County. Woodfill also represented Republican officials and activists (including Hotze, Texas Republican Party chair Allen West, and Agriculture Commissioner Sid Miller) in an attempt to block Governor Greg Abbott's extension of the early voting period. Both measures were adopted due to the COVID-19 pandemic and the Postal Service crisis, and were aimed at increasing voter turnout. Woodfill's bid to invalidate 127,000 votes cast through drive-through voting was rejected by both the Texas Supreme Court and the federal courts. Woodfill described the suit as an attempt to prevent Donald Trump from losing Texas, which he said would occur if "Harris County goes against Trump in large enough numbers." Woodfill subsequently supported legislation by Texas Republican legislators to ban drive-through voting.

==== Anti-vaccine litigation ====
In 2021, Woodfill filed an anti-vaccination lawsuit on behalf of a group of employees of Houston Methodist Hospital who refused to receive the COVID-19 vaccine, as required by the hospital. Of Houston Methodist's 26,000 staffers, 99% had received the vaccine, but 178 employees (including some receptionists, technicians, administrative workers, and nurses) refused and were suspended without pay as a result; of these, 117 employees represented by Woodfill sued the hospital system. The plaintiffs' complaint falsely characterized the COVID-19 vaccines as "experimental" and mRNA vaccines as "gene modification"; in fact, the COVID-19 vaccines are safe and effective, received emergency use authorization from the U.S. Food and Drug Administration, and do not modify genes. Woodfill's lawsuit was dismissed; in rejecting the suit, U.S. District Judge Lynn Hughes wrote that the plaintiffs' claim that the COVID-19 vaccines were "experimental and dangerous" was false and irrelevant and that the plaintiffs' comparison of the hospital's vaccine requirement to Nazi human experimentation during the Holocaust was "reprehensible." Woodfill unsuccessfully appealed to the U.S. Court of Appeals for the Fifth Circuit, which in 2022 affirmed the judgment of the district court.

=== 2024 campaign for state House ===
In 2023, Woodfill announced his run for state House in the 138th district, challenging incumbent Republican Lacey Hull. The district includes Jersey Village and other portions of the Cypress-Fairbanks (Cy-Fair) area. Although Hull is among the chamber's most conservative members, Woodfill accused her of being insufficiently conservative. Woodfill said that, if elected, he planned to run for House speaker.

Woodfill's primary challenge was backed by Texas Agriculture Commissioner Sid Miller and Texas Attorney General Ken Paxton. In 2023, when Paxton was impeached and faced removal from office, Woodfill rallied behind Paxton, and raised money for his defense. During his 2024 campaign, Woodfill criticized Hull for voting to impeach Paxton. In the March 2024 Republican primary, Hull defeated Woodfill. Hull received 8,835 votes (61.15%) and Woodfill 5,613 votes (38.85%).

Preceded by Gary M. Polland	Harris County Republican chairman 2002–2014	Succeeded by Paul Simpson
