= Southern Baptists of Texas Convention =

Association of Baptist churches

- Classification: Western Christian
- Orientation: Protestant
- Scripture: Bible
- Theology: Baptist
- Polity: Congregational
- Governance: Executive Board
- Executive Director: Nathan Lorick
- Associations: Southern Baptist Convention
- Region: Texas
- Headquarters: Grapevine, Texas
- Separated from: Baptist General Convention of Texas
- Congregations: 2,300 (2011)
- Other name: Southern Baptists of Texas
- Official website: sbtexas.com

The Southern Baptists of Texas Convention (SBTC) is an association of conservative Baptist churches in Texas, supportive of the Southern Baptist Convention and its entities. The Southern Baptists of Texas were formed by churches within the Baptist General Convention of Texas so that they might partner more closely with the national body in a fellowship based on a common, conservative commitment to the inerrancy of Scripture. As of 2011, it had approximately 2,300 affiliated churches.

== History ==
The earliest precursor to the SBTC was the Conservative Baptist Fellowship of Texas. Members of that fellowship joined other conservative Southern Baptists to form the Southern Baptists of Texas in 1995. This group operated within the Baptist General Convention of Texas until a new entity the Southern Baptists of Texas Convention was founded in 1998.

The groups that preceded the new convention sought closer cooperation between the Baptist General convention of Texas and the Southern Baptist Convention than existed during the conservative resurgence of the national body. However, the Baptist General Convention of Texas's refusal to endorse the more conservative leanings of SBC leadership led the Southern Baptists of Texas to organize a separate state convention in November 1998. The new state convention, though autonomous, immediately formed closer partnerships with the entities of the SBC, similar to most other state conventions.

As it continued to grow, the SBTC adopted the Southern Baptist Convention's 2000 Baptist Faith and Message as its own statement of faith. The SBTC's purpose, according to its mission statement, is to "facilitate, extend, and enlarge the Great Commission of the Southern Baptist Convention and Southern Baptist churches and associations of Texas." Churches have only been allowed to affiliate if they affirm the convention's statement of faith; consents to work within its legal frameworks and cooperates; and affirms a male-only pastorate and rejects affirming the LGBTQ community.

Several new Baptist associations have been formed by SBTC churches (one being the North Texas Baptist Association, serving the Dallas-Fort Worth area), though the SBTC itself does not promote their formation. Most SBTC churches choose to remain in longtime associations.

== Partnerships and affiliations ==
The SBTC does not own and operate any institutions of higher education or any other form of ministry. However, it has affiliations and partnerships with entities that are owned by the Southern Baptist Convention or directly related to themselves. For instance, the Southern Baptists of Texas has an affiliative relationship with Criswell College in Dallas, and Jacksonville College; Jacksonville is however operated by the Baptist Missionary Association of America.

== Sources ==
- Herb Hollinger, November 25, 1997, Texas Baptist leaders respond to new convention, BP News.
