= Second Baptist Church Houston =

Coordinates: 29.7577°N 95.4992°W

- Second Baptist Church Houston
- Location: Houston
- Country: United States
- Denomination: Baptist
- Website: second.org

History
- Founded: 1927

Administration
- Division: Southern Baptists of Texas Convention

Second Baptist Church Houston is a Baptist multi-site megachurch based in Houston, Texas, US. It is affiliated with the Southern Baptist Convention and the Southern Baptists of Texas Convention. Its senior pastor is now Dr. Ben Young.

== History ==
Second Baptist Church was founded in 1927 when 121 people met at the old Taylor School in downtown Houston. A year later, it acquired its first permanent facility when it moved to the former St. Paul's Methodist Church on Milam and McGowen streets in downtown.

In 1946, the church sponsored foundation of the Second Baptist School as a self-supporting agency. The school occupies a 42-acre (170,000 m^{2}) campus in the Memorial area and is open to students without regard to religion or economic background.

In 1957, Second Baptist moved west to the current main location, now the Woodway Campus, on Woodway Drive and Voss Road. The church hoped to reach families in the already fast-growing western portion of Houston. The Woodway Campus boasts the largest all-pipe Rodgers organ ever built, with 192 stops and 10,412 total pipes, qualifying the instrument as one of the largest pipe organs in the world. In 2008, the extensive damage from the Hurricane Ike required the church's 5,500 seats Worship Center to be repaired.

In 1979, the church launched a weekly broadcast of worship services on local television. In 1982, a local radio program began, as well as national TV broadcasting known as The Winning Walk. Since then this has expanded into international television, radio and internet distribution of the church's message. In 2025, ownership of the broadcast was transferred to Dr. Ed Young following his retirement from the church. It is now registered in Texas as Power & Light Ministries, although it continues to go by the trade name The Winning Walk. It remains unclear whether the program was gifted or sold to Dr. Young.

In 1999, Second Baptist opened its West Campus with a 4,500-seat worship center and separate buildings for educational programs, weddings, funerals, and other events. It includes a 215,000-square-foot (20,000 m^{2}) classroom facility as well as other meeting spaces. In 2004, Forest Cove Baptist Church joined Second Baptist and was renamed the North Campus, and satellite campuses in Pearland and Cypress were established in 2006, along with the addition of the 1463 campus in Fulshear in 2015. Together, Second Baptist Church consists of six physical campuses.

Under the leadership of then Sr. Pastor Dr. Ed Young, the church grew from an average weekend attendance of 500 in 1978 to over 22,723 in 2009. In addition to worship facilities it "has fitness centers, bookstores, information desks, a café, a K-12 school and free automotive repair service for single mothers."

On Easter day in 2012, the church began Spanish-language services.

In 2016, Second Baptist Church in cooperation with Community of Faith Church, developed and launched Loving Kids, a ministry in which three Houston elementary schools were adopted "to help support children by way of mentors, tutors and teacher assistants."

In November 2018, CBS News listed Second Baptist Church as the 15th largest megachurch in the United States with about 20,656 weekly visitors.

It has a membership of over 80,000 as of October 7, 2019.

According to a church census released in 2023, it claimed a weekly attendance of 17,998 people.

In May 2024, Dr. Ed Young stepped down after 46 years as Senior Pastor, and his son, Ben Young, was installed as the new Senior Pastor.

In April of 2025, a group of current and former church members filed litigation against the former pastor Dr. Young, current pastor Ben Young, church administrator Lee Maxcy, lawyer Dennis Brewer Jr, and the Second Baptist Church Corporation. The lawsuit claims the defendants known as “The Young Group” quietly revoked the congregations voting rights under the guise of combating “the woke agenda”.In a letter to Ben Young dated September of 2024 the group warns of the dangers the lack of transparency and accountability in the amended bylaws poses to the church for generations to come The litigation is ongoing and a trial was scheduled. Grant Dorfman, a judge, ruled that due to ecclesiastical abstention, the court could not determine whether the church actions were morally correct, but only whether they followed state law; this nullified most of the claims against the church leadership.

== Beliefs ==
It is affiliated with the Southern Baptists of Texas Convention (Southern Baptist Convention).

== See also ==
- Megachurches
- List of the largest churches in the USA
- Christianity in Houston
