= List of state and other conventions associated with the Southern Baptist Convention =

This list of state and other conventions associated with the Southern Baptist Convention contains those geographically based conventions and associations that associate with the Southern Baptist Convention.

== State conventions ==
State conventions associated with the SBC include:

State(s)	Convention Name
Alabama	Alabama Baptist State Board of Missions
Alaska	Alaska Baptist Resource Network
Arizona	Arizona Southern Baptist Convention
Arkansas	Arkansas Baptist State Convention
California	California Southern Baptist Convention
Colorado	Colorado Baptist General Convention
North Dakota	Dakota Baptist Convention
South Dakota	Dakota Baptist Convention
Florida	Florida Baptist Convention
Georgia	Georgia Baptist Mission Board
Hawaii	Hawaii Pacific Baptist Convention^{[a]}
Illinois	Illinois Baptist State Association
Indiana	State Convention of Baptists in Indiana
Iowa	Baptist Convention of Iowa
Kansas	Kansas-Nebraska Convention of Southern Baptists
Nebraska	Kansas-Nebraska Convention of Southern Baptists
Kentucky	Kentucky Baptist Convention
Louisiana	Louisiana Baptist Convention
Maryland	Baptist Convention of Maryland/Delaware
Delaware	Baptist Convention of Maryland/Delaware
Michigan	Baptist State Convention of Michigan
Minnesota	Minnesota-Wisconsin Baptist Convention
Wisconsin	Minnesota-Wisconsin Baptist Convention
Mississippi	Mississippi Baptist Convention Board
Missouri	Missouri Baptist Convention
Montana	Montana Southern Baptist Convention
Nevada	Nevada Baptist Convention
Connecticut	Baptist Convention of New England
Maine	Baptist Convention of New England
Massachusetts	Baptist Convention of New England
New Hampshire	Baptist Convention of New England
Rhode Island	Baptist Convention of New England
Vermont	Baptist Convention of New England
New Mexico	Baptist Convention of New Mexico
New York	Baptist Convention of New York
New Jersey (North)	Baptist Convention of New York
North Carolina	Baptist State Convention of North Carolina
Oregon	Northwest Baptist Convention
Washington	Northwest Baptist Convention
Ohio	State Convention of Baptists in Ohio
Oklahoma	Baptist General Convention of Oklahoma
Pennsylvania	Baptist Resource Network of Pennsylvania/South Jersey
New Jersey (South)	Baptist Resource Network of Pennsylvania/South Jersey
South Carolina	South Carolina Baptist Convention
Tennessee	Tennessee Baptist Mission Board
Texas	Baptist General Convention of Texas^{[b]}
Texas	Southern Baptists of Texas Convention^{[c]}
Utah	Utah-Idaho Southern Baptist Convention
Idaho	Utah-Idaho Southern Baptist Convention
Virginia	Baptist General Association of Virginia^{[b]}
Virginia	Southern Baptist Conservatives of Virginia^{[d]}
West Virginia	West Virginia Convention of Southern Baptists
Wyoming	Wyoming Southern Baptist Mission Network

== Additional supported and affiliated conventions ==
- Convention of Southern Baptist Churches in Puerto Rico

== Former conventions ==
The SBC severed its relationship in 2018 when the District of Columbia Baptist Convention refused to expel Calvary Baptist Church after the congregation hired a legally married lesbian couple as co-pastors.

== Notes ==
- ^{a} Convention includes other pacific regions such as Guam
- ^{b} Convention is a member of the Baptist World Alliance
- ^{c} Convention separated from the Baptist General Convention of Texas
- ^{d} Convention separated from the Baptist General Association of Virginia

== See also ==
- List of Southern Baptist Convention affiliated people
