= Charis (name) =

- Pronunciation: /ˈkeɪrɪs/

Origin
- Origin: Ancient Greek
- Meaning: "one of the Graces", "grace" or "kindness"

Other names
- Related names: Charissa (English variant), Haris (Greek variant transcription)

Charis (Ancient Greek: Χάρις) is a given name derived from a Greek word meaning "grace, kindness, and life." It is a unisex name, overwhelmingly used for men in Greece and overwhelmingly used for women elsewhere in the world.

In Greek mythology, Charis is one of the Charites (Greek: Χάριτες) or "Graces", goddesses of charm, beauty, nature, human creativity, and fertility.

The Greek and Hebrew biblical term Charis (χάρις) refers to good will, loving-kindness, favour, and in particular, God's merciful grace. It is used over 140 times in the New Testament and is a central concept in the theology developed by St. Augustine of Hippo.

It is used in the descriptive epithet of many plant genera and species. Including; Ammocharis (meaning sand and beauty), Eleocharis (meaning marsh and beauty), Englerocharis, Eucharis (meaning good and beauty), Hydrocharis (meaning water and beauty), Nomocharis, Argostemma phyllocharis (meaning leaf and beauty), and Pimelea ammocharis.

== Notable people ==
- Charis Baniotis (born 1960), Greek footballer
- Charis Bekker (born 2004), Australian cricketer
- Charis Charisis (born 1995), Greek footballer
- Charis Eng (born 1962), Singapore-born physician, scientist and geneticist
- Charis Frankenburg (1892–1985), British author
- Charis Galanakis (born 1981), Greek researcher and scientist
- Charis Giannopoulos (born 1989), Greek basketball player
- Charis Grammos (born 1948), Greek footballer
- Charis Johnson (born 1972), Ponzi scheme operator
- Charis Kopitsis (born 1969), Greek footballer and manager
- Charis Kostakis (born 1990), Greek footballer
- Charis Kostopoulos (born 1964), Greek singer, songwriter, poet, and composer
- Charis Kubrin, American criminologist
- Charis Markopoulos (born 1982), Greek basketball player and coach
- Charis Michelsen (born 1974), American actress and writer
- Charis Mullen (born 1974), Australian politician
- Charis Nicolaou (born 1974), Cypriot footballer
- Charis Papageorgiou (born 1953), Greek basketball player
- Charis Papazoglou (born 1953), Greek basketball player and coach
- Charis Pavely (born 2004), English cricketer
- Charis Pavlidis (born 1971), Greek water polo player and coach
- Charis Scott (born 2002), Scottish cricketer
- Charis Thompson, professor and author
- Charis Tsevis (born 1967), Greek visual designer, illustrator, and art director
- Charis Waddy (1909–2004), Australian-born British author, lecturer, and Islamic scholar
- Charis Wilson (1914–2009), American model and writer
- Charis Yulianto (born 1978), Indonesian footballer

== See also ==
- Charisma
- Charls
