= Tokyo Baptist Church =

Church in Shibuya, Japan

Coordinates: 35.650369°N 139.697637°E

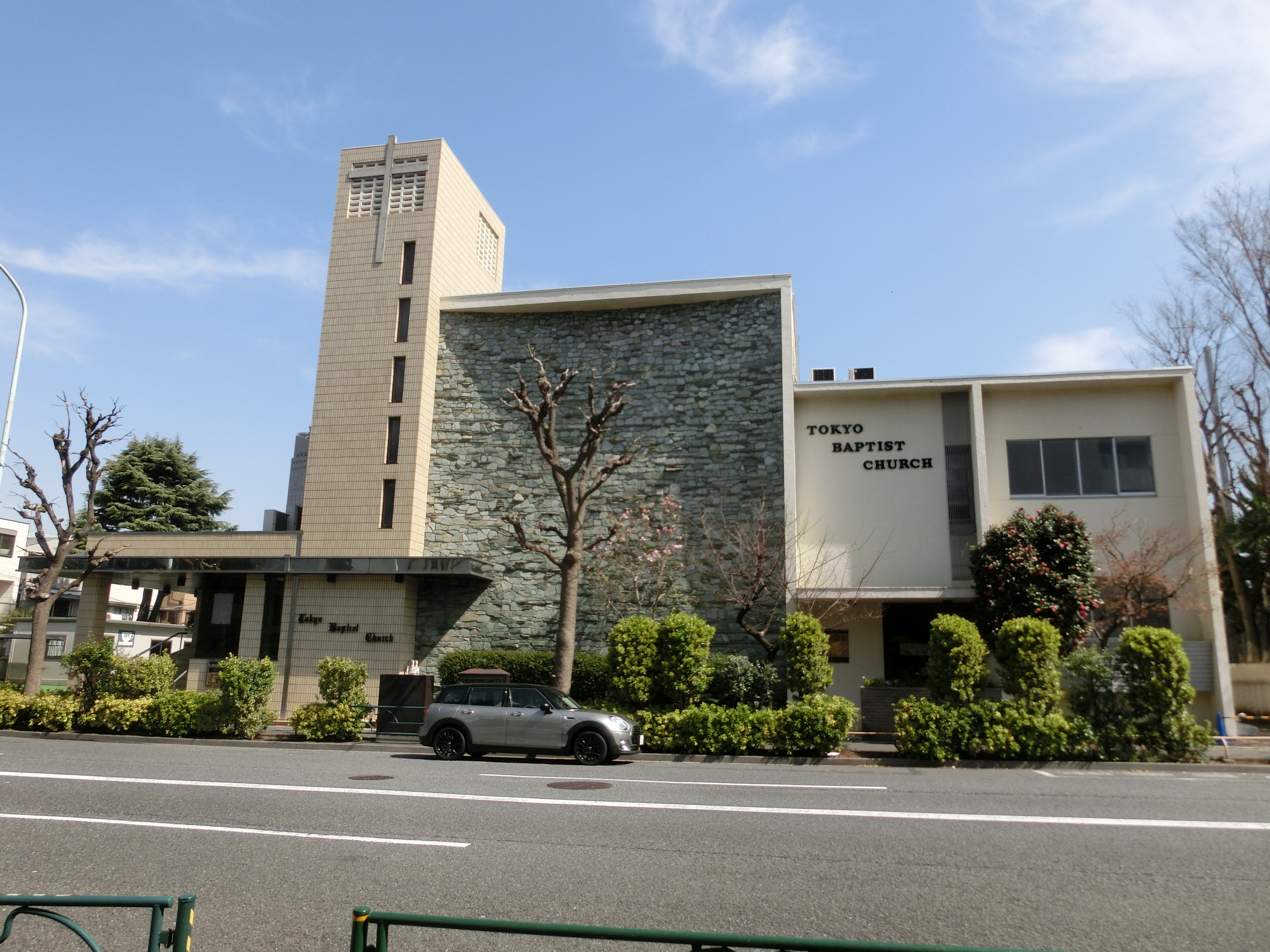
- Tokyo Baptist Church
- Location: Shibuya, Tokyo
- Country: Japan
- Denomination: Baptist
- Website: tokyobaptist.org

History
- Founded: 1958

Administration
- Division: Hawaii Pacific Baptist Convention

Tokyo Baptist Church (Japanese: 東京バプテスト教会) is a Baptist multi-site church based in Shibuya Tokyo, Japan. It is affiliated with the Southern Baptist Convention and the Hawaii Pacific Baptist Convention.

== History ==
Second Baptist Church was founded in 1958 by William "Dub" Jackson.

== Beliefs ==
Part of the Southern Baptist Convention through membership of the Hawaii Pacific Baptist Convention.
