= Leadenhall Street Baptist Church =

Historic church in Maryland, United States

- U.S. National Register of Historic Places
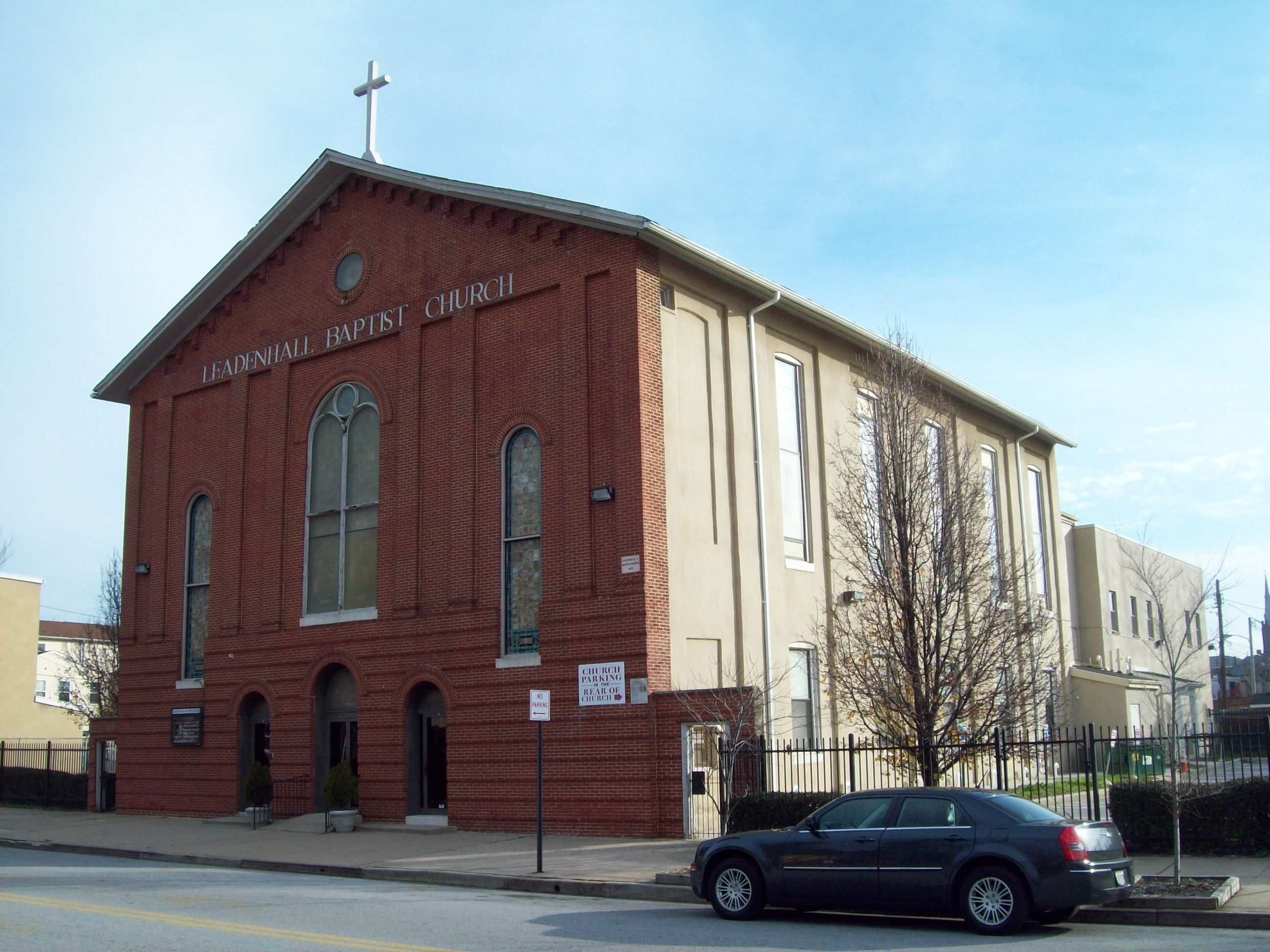
- Leadenhall Street Baptist Church, December 2011

- Location within Baltimore Location within Maryland Location within the United States
- Location: 1021-1023 Leadenhall Street, Baltimore, Maryland
- Coordinates: 39°16′38″N 76°37′3″W
- Area: 0.2 acres (0.081 ha)
- Built: 1873
- Architect: Thomas, Joseph, & Son
- Architectural style: Romanesque Revival architecture
- NRHP reference No.: 79003218
- Added to NRHP: March 16, 1979

Leadenhall Street Baptist Church is a historic Baptist church located at Baltimore, Maryland, United States. It is a gable-front rectangular brick temple with simple Renaissance Revival detail. The original exterior wall surfaces have been covered with formstone on the main façade and stucco elsewhere. It features round-arched stained glass windows on each side bay. It was built in 1873, by Joseph Thomas & Son for the city's African American Baptists who were then centered in the old southwest area from the downtown business district of Baltimore in the "Sharp-Leadenhall" (named for the intersecting nearby streets) community in the old "South Baltimore" area. Nearby is its now famed revitalized "Inner Harbor" area of the old "Basin" for the harbor port.

The neighborhood is just west of the Federal Hill community and commercial district connected by West Hamburg Street, which is along South Charles and Light Streets, and the famous hill itself, which was the site of a celebratory picnic in 1788 after a parade of the various guilds, organizations and military units of old "Baltimore Town" to commemorate the ratification by Maryland of the new Federal Constitution, and later fortified with earthen embankments and large cannons of artillery by Northern troops of the Union Army a month after, during the Civil War to keep a close watch on and control on the Southern-sympathizing citizens of the City who had erupted in April 1861, in a riot attacking passing Massachusetts and Pennsylvania troops from the President Street Station on the east side from Philadelphia and the North, on their way to the nearby (a few blocks away with the Washington tracks running right by the Church) Camden Street Station of the famous Baltimore and Ohio Railroad to defend the National Capital of Washington from the newly seceded Virginians and Confederates.

The "Sharp-Leadenhall" neighborhood just west of the Harbor was one of the first neighborhoods to become predominantly African American residents among the City's largest free-Black population in America, in the late 19th century. Prior to this era of beginning housing segregation, most of Baltimore's "free citizens of color" lived amidst the white population in the small compact town, residing on the smaller streets and alleyways in between larger avenues and main streets, seeking employment in the homes and businesses of the majority white population. Often poorer residents, lived right in back or around the corner from substantial mansions and townhouses of the wealthy and well-to-do. In later years, additional populations of free blacks began moving to the northwest just beyond the Mount Vernon-Belvedere neighborhood and beyond Seton Hill, along the future Pennsylvania Avenue and Druid Hill Avenue of what became known as Upton.

The building was built and financed by the predominantly "colored" Maryland Baptist Union Association, (as opposed to the organization of the Baptist Convention of Maryland) who had generally separated from the white Baptists after often worshipping together in the small building during the colonial days of the late 18th century (although most of the time in upper balconies or separate pews/chairs in the sanctuary), into the early 19th century of the American Republic. It is the second oldest Black church edifice in Baltimore, and home to one of the city's largest African American congregations.

Another prominent congregation in the area that was an important force in the City's burgeoning African-American community was the nearby Sharp Street Methodist Church which later followed its members in later decades also to the northwest neighborhoods, where after a series of National Methodist church mergers is now still called Sharp Street United Methodist Church, although it left that location long ago, unlike the Leadenhall Church.

Leadenhall Street Baptist Church was listed on the National Register of Historic Places in 1979. which is maintained by the National Park Service of the United States Department of the Interior, according to the Historic Sites Act of August 1935. With the designation of much of downtown Baltimore and its immediate inner eastern, western and northern residential historic neighborhoods as the Baltimore City National Heritage Area has been established. Under the same NPS and USDI influence and direction, with local supervision from city and state historical professionals, a series of new additional huge plaques have been mounted on streetside poles with illustrations, maps and text of the various historic sites, buildings, monuments and various tours of the heritage areas in the immediate block of that particular sign. On the other side is similar material for the BCNHA in general, and exhibits/tours available to be led and run out of the Visitors Center pavilion, along the western shore of the "Inner Harbor", with the additional printed brochures containing maps, pictures and text plus the material available on an internet website. Prominent display is given to the African-American heritage in the southwest "Sharp-Leadenhall" and northwest "Upton/Druid Hill" areas by the Pennsylvania Avenue commercial and entertainment/social district. It points out the Leadenhall Church site and many other black churches and institutions with the homes and locations of significant people.
