= Ladder scheme =

Ladder scheme may refer to:

- Ladder logic, to develop software for programmable logic controllers
- Matrix scheme, an unsustainable business model
