= SCBI =

SCBI may refer to:

- Smithsonian Conservation Biology Institute
- State Convention of Baptists in Indiana
- Sylloge of Coins of the British Isles
- the ICAO airport code for Pampa Guanaco Airport
