= Corey J. Hodges =

American preacher and journalist (born 1970)

- Born: December 14, 1970 (age 55); St. Petersburg, Florida, United States
- Education: Regent University
- Occupations: Pastor, columnist, founder, musician
- Website: www.thepointslc.com

Corey J. Hodges (born December 14, 1970, in St. Petersburg, Florida) is an American preacher and the chaplain for the NBA Utah Jazz professional basketball team. He began as a Pastor at New Pilgrim Baptist church before the Olympics in 2002. He was a columnist for The Salt Lake Tribune faith section for five years. He was also a regular host of the television program This week in the Word which aired weekly on Utah's KTMW.

== Biography ==
Hodges is currently the pastor of The Point Church, a multicultural Christian church in Salt Lake City, Utah that has membership from over 40 different nations and holds weekly services in both English and Spanish. His church is affiliated with both the National Baptist Convention, USA, Inc. and the Southern Baptist Convention. Hodges was the first Vice-President of the Utah Idaho Southern Baptist Convention from 2017-2021, and he served six years as the President of the Intermountain General Baptist Convention Inc., which covers three states: Utah, Idaho, and Wyoming.

Hodges is a member of the Utah State Ethics Commission, appointed by former Utah Governor Gary Herbert (the Commission investigates ethics allegations against officials in any political subdivision in the state). Hodges chairs the Salt Lake County's Council on Diversity Affairs (CODA). In 2006, Hodges was appointed to serve on the Initiative on Utah Children in Foster Care (IOU) board by former Utah Supreme Court Chief Justice Christine M. Durham. He previously served on the Governor's Olene Walker Board of Economic Development.

Hodges is a 2006 recipient of the Community of Peace Award given to outstanding citizens who model peace and make a personal commitment towards making Salt Lake County a community of peace. In 2009, he received the City of Taylorsville, Utah, citizen's award and in 2010, former Utah Governor Gary Herbert presented him with an award for his outstanding service to the Utah community. Pastor Hodges is also the 2010 recipient of the NAACP Salt Lake Branch Albert B. Fritz Civil Rights/Humanitarian Worker of the Year Award and in 2015 he received the Dr. Martin Luther King Jr. Award.

On July 14, 2007, Hodges wrote a column for The Salt Lake Tribune titled, "Women face many difficulties leaving abusive spouses," in which he stated that Fox News Channel commentator Bill O'Reilly blamed Nancy Benoit and Jessie Davis for their deaths. O'Reilly retorted by calling Hodges' claim an "outrageous lie" on the July 16 O'Reilly Factor "Most Ridiculous Item of the Day." Hodges responded with another column in the Salt Lake Tribune on July 21 titled, "Perhaps I misunderstood O'Reilly's comments about murders," in which he argued that his statements were "probably more accurately characterized as a misinterpretation rather than a lie." On his July 23 show, O'Reilly again said that Hodges statements were a "flat out lie."

Hodges holds an associates and bachelor's degree in Business Administration and Marketing and a Masters of Arts in Divinity from Regent University in Virginia Beach, Virginia.
