= WSBC (disambiguation) =

WSBC is a radio station broadcasting a variety format.

WSBC may also refer to:

- Walnut Street Baptist Church (Waterloo, Iowa), listed on the National Register of Historic Places in Iowa
- Walnut Street Baptist Church (Louisville, Kentucky), a former megachurch in Louisville, Kentucky
- Wandsworth School Boys' Choir, a defunct English choir
- Wealthy Street Baptist Church, a fundamentalist church in Michigan
- Westminster School Boat Club, a boys' boat club in London
- White Sea – Baltic Canal, a ship canal in Russia
- Wyoming Southern Baptist Convention, a group of churches affiliated with the Southern Baptist Convention
