= Shawn Merriman =

Shawn Merriman may refer to:

- Shawn Merriman (fraudster), a former American investment adviser and lay leader in The Church of Jesus Christ of Latter-day Saints
- Shawne Merriman, a former American football linebacker
