= Charis Johnson =

Ponzi scheme operator

Charis F. Johnson
- Born: 1972 (age 53–54)
- Known for: Running a Ponzi scheme

Charis F. Johnson is the founder and former administrator of the investment autosurf 12DailyPro. Johnson founded LifeClicks, LLC, the company which owns 12DailyPro, in her apartment home in Charlotte, North Carolina, United States.

== Ponzi scheme ==
12DailyPro was a version of what is commonly known as a “paid autosurf” program where “investors” deposited money, ranging from US$6.00 to US$6000.00 per account, and received an extremely high profit (144%) within a short period (12 days). Under the umbrella of her company, LifeClicks, and through the use of her experience in marketing and web development, Johnson created one of the largest modern day versions of the Ponzi scheme. Through the use of her website, she manipulated thousands of people to join and deposit money.

In the later stages of the fraudulent scheme, she managed to retain investors' trust by repeatedly bouncing blame and failures on other companies, groups, and individuals, including Brigham Young University students and professors, StormPay, ABC4 News of Salt Lake City, Utah and even the government of the United States. “Ms. Johnson was extremely successful in attracting investors and raised approximately $50 million in less than nine months.”

It was later discovered that Johnson had been siphoning money from the funds she generated using 12DailyPro (an excess of US$1.9 million) into her personal bank account since mid-2005. When the company was shut down many of these people lost large sums of money, although the earliest “investors” remained in profit.

== SEC involvement ==
On 24 February 2006, the SEC entered into a stipulation with 12DailyPro and its parent company LifeClicks LLC for a permanent injunction. On 28 February, a Los Angeles judge ordered all company assets and records to be turned over to Thomas F. Lennon, an appointed receiver, for investigation, who published his first interim report on 1 September 2006 (see below). Charis F. Johnson now faces criminal and civil suits from both state and federal agencies. She no longer resides in the Charlotte, NC area. Her current whereabouts are unknown.
