= Baptist Foundation of Arizona =

American fraudulent charity (1948–1999)

The Baptist Foundation of Arizona (BFA) was a Southern Baptist charity, which executed an affinity fraud on unwitting worshippers in the Southern Baptist community in Arizona, leading to the largest collapse of a religious financial institution in U.S. history. The BFA was associated with the Arizona Southern Baptist Convention, which was affiliated with the national organization. When the BFA filed for bankruptcy in 1999, it had $530 million in liabilities as compared to a reported $70 million in assets.

== History ==
The Arizona Southern Baptist Convention was founded in 1928. In 1948, the Baptist Foundation of Arizona was founded and initially sought to provide a financial revenue for participants while supporting Baptist-motivated causes. In 1962, Pastor Glen Crotts became the organization's first president. Under his leadership, the organization held strict moral values, including its officers being forbidden to gamble or drink alcohol. Twenty years later, Glen Crotts' son, William Pierre "Bill" Crotts, became the organization's second president.

The BFA consistently sold the concept that its main objective was to help its investors serve the work of the Arizona Southern Baptist Convention, while also providing them with favorable returns, as stated in a BFA investor brochure:

We are a ministry dedicated to serving the Lord and furthering Southern Baptist and other Christian causes. We re-invest your money and the profit we earn goes to further such ministries as Christian education, care for children and senior adults, missions and new church starts. Your investment actually touches the lives of countless numbers while you earn a very attractive interest rate.

== 1999 Bankruptcy ==
The Baptist Foundation of Arizona declared bankruptcy in 1999, citing $530 million in liabilities against $70 million in assets.

The collapse of the BFA did not occur in a vacuum. In 1992, records indicated that the company had lost $3.2 million due to questionable transactions. The Reverend Ed Shaw suggested that the BFA "Explain the situation completely to investors; ask their forgiveness; let them know their gift of principal would help if they choose to give some or all of it." Instead the BFA decided to hide its debt and began a series of dubious activities. Under Bill Crotts, the organization diverted over $140 million to two former and one active (as of 1998) director. The organization did this through the use of over 63 different public and private organizations all directly affiliated with the BFA.

Each of these related companies had Bill Crotts and the BFA's chief attorney, Tom Grabinski, on their board. Grabinski signed documents as an officer for both BFA and a subsidiary. When asked if a conflict of interest existed, the BFA indicated that both parties "had waived any conflicts of interest." Since he was working for both companies, Grabinski was able to authorize questionable transactions. For example, on one day Grabinski attested to the value of a piece of property twice. The first time he attested to the value, he indicated that the property was worth $3.3 million. The second time, on the same day, he declared the same piece of property was valued at $960,000.

== Fraudulent activities ==
The BFA carried out a number of illegal activities in perpetrating affinity fraud against Southern Baptist worshipers in Arizona.

Good bank-bad bank

The BFA had issued millions of dollars in money-losing loans. In order to remove those loans from its books, the BFA secretly funneled money to a subsidiary. The subsidiary then used that money to purchase the loans from the parent company. In a Good bank-bad bank scheme, the two companies manipulate transactions to favor the public institution while using the "bad bank" to hide the deficiencies.

Maximum Value Performance Note

The BFA sold certificates of deposit that were non-refundable during the life of the CD. MVPNs were marketed with the notion that they received a higher than average yield and that part of the investment's return was used for God's mission. MVPNs were "fraudulently represented ... as one which could be redeemed at any time, although with an interest penalty." Elder law attorney Leas wondered why BFA would sell the elderly, "an investment that would tie up more than two-thirds of their non-residential assets in an investment that would be unavailable for five years!"

Ponzi schemes

Mechanisms whereby the early investors make a profit by receiving the contributions of later investors. The BFA became dependent upon future investors to pay older investors and loan interest.

Land flipping

A land flipping scheme is one where a person or company inflates the value of a piece of property to make more money. For example, the Phoenix New Times reported a case wherein an individual wanted to sell a US$1.9M (million) piece of asbestos-contaminated property to the BFA for US$1 as a tax write off. The BFA was not interested in making this purchase. Instead, they referred the individual to former BFA Director, Jalma Hunsinger, who then purchased the property for US$1. Hunsinger subsequently used the property as collateral to obtain a US$6.8M loan from the BFA. Essentially, in a transaction that favored a former director, the BFA accepted a piece of property (which the BFA itself declined to purchase) as collateral for a loan that amounted to US$4.9M more than the property's appraisal value.

Condo properties

The BFA sold property to the elderly that was marketed as a retirement community with a nursing home. The person did not actually purchase the property, but purchased the right to occupy said property. Thus, when people tried to sell it they could not because they did not own anything.

== Judgments ==
The Arizona Attorney General's Office and the Arizona Corporation Commission conducted the criminal investigation that resulted in the convictions of eight defendants. At the time of its failure in 1999, it was the largest affinity fraud that had ever occurred in the United States, with a total loss estimated at US$550 million (equivalent to $1,038 million in 2024). Indictments were handed down in April 2001; by July 2006, when BFA's president and CEO William Crotts and BFA's Chief Legal Counsel Thomas Grabinski were found guilty at trial on multiple counts of fraud, five other defendants had already pleaded guilty. The trial of Grabinski and Crotts was the longest criminal jury trial in the history of the state of Arizona. Crotts was sentenced to eight years in prison, while Grabinski was sentenced to six years; the two convicted criminals were required to pay $159 million (equivalent to $248 million in 2024), each, in restitution.

In 2002, Grabinski sued BFA's insurance carrier, National Union Fire Insurance Company of Pittsburgh, Pa. (National Union), for coverage of his legal fees per the Directors and Officers liability coverage purchased from National Union, plus damages. In February 2004, the jury in the Arizona Superior Court civil trial found in favor of Grabinski, with the Court ordering National Union to pay Grabinski $2.5 million (equivalent to $4.2 million in 2024). National Union appealed that ruling, leading to Grabinski suing them in July 2004 for damages due to abuse of process; the abuse of process claim was denied by the United States District Court for the District of Arizona in a September 2005 ruling on National Union's motion to dismiss. Independent of the abuse of process ruling, the original Arizona Superior Court ruling was upheld by the Arizona Court of Appeals in March 2005, at which point National Union paid the $2.5 million to Grabinski.

In early 2007, several former members of the BFA's executive management team were sentenced for the fraudulent activities associated with the BFA. Donald Dale Deardorff, Senior Vice President and Controller, was sentenced to four years in prison and a fine of $150 million (equivalent to $227 million in 2024). Jalma Hunsinger, President and Director of Church Ventures (a company whose stated purpose was to build churches), paid $150,000 (equivalent to $227,000 in 2024).

In 2002, a judge in the civil court case of the BFA Liquidation Trust versus Arthur Andersen, the Big Five accounting firm that also failed to properly audit Enron, officially approved a settlement that would pay former BFA investors $217 million (equivalent to $379 million in 2024) for Andersen's failure to identify fraudulent activities at the BFA. The court signing off on the settlement meant that the BFA Liquidation Trust had standing should Andersen – which was at the time being charged for issues surrounding Enron – be unable to make that payment. Christianity Today reported that the timing of this court approved settlement avoided "the worst case scenario for Baptist Foundation investors" of Andersen being convicted in its then ongoing criminal case regarding its audits of Enron, then quickly filing "for bankruptcy-court protection" from any civil lawsuits not yet settled in a court. At the time, this settlement was the second largest settlement in the nation's history for a Big Five accounting firm that was not related to the Savings and Loan collapses of 1986 to 1995.

== In popular culture ==
In 2007, the first story on the episode "Religious Prey: Baptist Foundation Of Arizona / Medical Scams: Dr. Mikos", of the television series American Greed, covered the fraudulent behavior of the Baptist Foundation of Arizona.
