= High-yield investment program =

Type of Ponzi scheme

A high-yield investment program (HYIP) is a type of Ponzi scheme, an investment scam that promises unsustainably high return on investment by paying previous investors with the money invested by new investors.

== Mechanics ==
Operators generally set up a website offering an "investment program" which promises very high returns, such as 1% per day (3678% APY when returns are compounded every day), disclosing little or no detail about the underlying management, location, or other aspects of how money is to be invested. The U.S. Securities and Exchange Commission (SEC) has said that "these fraudulent schemes involve the purported issuance, trading, or use of so-called 'prime' bank, 'prime' European bank or 'prime' world bank financial instruments, or other 'high yield investment programs.' (HYIP's) The fraud artists ... seek to mislead investors by suggesting that well regarded and financially sound institutions participate in these bogus programs." In 2010, the Financial Industry Regulatory Authority (FINRA) warned that "[t]he con artists behind HYIPs are experts at using social media — including YouTube, Twitter and Facebook — to lure investors and create the illusion of social consensus that these investments are legitimate."

Some investors try to make money by attempting to invest in HYIPs at an early enough stage to create a return, and then by cashing out before the scheme collapses to profit at the expense of the later entrants. This is in itself a gamble as poor timing may result in a total loss of all money invested. To reduce this risk, some of these investors use "tracker sites" listing the schemes and their current state. One expert states that there is not enough evidence to corroborate that tracker sites can actually help investors make more money.

== Examples ==
=== Zeek Rewards ===
On August 17, 2012, the U.S. Securities and Exchange Commission (SEC) filed a complaint against defendants Paul Burks and Zeek Rewards, based in North Carolina.

Paul Burks ran Zeek Rewards, an "investment opportunity" that promised investors returns by sharing in the profits of Zeekler, a penny auction website.

Money invested in Zeek Rewards earned returns of 1.5% per day. Investors were encouraged to let their gains compound and to recruit new members into a "forced matrix" to increase their returns.

The SEC contends that this forced matrix payout scheme constitutes a pyramid scheme. New investors had to pay a monthly subscription fee of between US$10 and US$99, and provide an initial investment of up to $10,000. The higher the initial investment, the higher the returns appeared. The SEC stated that the Zeekler website brought in only about 1% of the Zeek Rewards company's purported income and that the vast majority of disbursed funds were paid from new investments.

The SEC alleges that Zeek Rewards is a $600 million Ponzi scheme affecting 1 million investors, which would be one of the largest Ponzi schemes in history by number of affected investors. A court-appointed receiver estimated that the $600 million amount could be "on the low end" and that the number of investors could be as many as 2 million. Paul Burks paid $4 million to the SEC and agreed to cooperate with its investigation.

In February 2017 Burks was sentenced to 14 years and 8 months' imprisonment for his part in Zeek Rewards.

=== OSGold ===
OSGold was founded as an e-gold imitator in 2001 by David Reed and folded in 2002. According to a lawsuit filed in U.S. District Court in early 2005, the operators of OSGold may have made off with US$250 million. CNet reported that "at the height of its popularity, the OSGold currency boasted more than 60,000 accounts created by people drawn to promises of 'high yield' investments that would provide guaranteed monthly returns of 30 percent to 45 percent."

=== PIPS ===
PIPS (People in Profit System or Pure Investors) was started by Bryan Marsden in early 2004 and spanned more than 20 countries. PIPS was investigated by Bank Negara Malaysia in 2005 which resulted in Marsden and his wife being charged in a Malaysian court with 97 counts of money laundering more than 77 million RM, equivalent to $20 million.

=== Colonyinvest ===
Another large case took place in Thailand in 2008. Colonyinvest cheated 50,000 Thai investors out of about 5 billion baht (~ 150 million US$).

=== Other HYIPs ===
Other HYIPs that have been shut down due to legal action include Ginsystem Inc, Sunshine Empire in Singapore, City Limouzine, Future Maker in India, EMGOLDEX or Emirates Gold Exchange, and WorldWide Solutionz in South Africa.

== See also ==
- Autosurfing
- Forex scam
