= Autosurf =

Internet advertising system

In Internet marketing, autosurfs are traffic exchanges that automatically rotate advertised websites in one's web browser, used to artificially generate website traffic. Members earn credits for each site that they view, which can then be spent to advertise members' sites by adding them to the autosurf rotation. Sites may additionally be added by external advertisers who pay the autosurf operators.

== Concept ==
Autosurfing is a form of traffic exchange, a website on which users are encouraged to view each other's websites. Autosurf websites advance through a set of pages automatically, to generate traffic to multiple websites in a short span of time, and pay users for having generated the traffic. Some require paid membership upgrades in order to generate higher payments for viewing sites. Some sites promise double- or triple-digit returns on investment, often within days or weeks of joining, to justify the upgrades' cost.

== 12DailyPro ==
12DailyPro, founded by Charis Johnson, was one of the largest autosurfs in 2005. Promising a return of 12% daily for 12 days, funds invested went into the millions. In February 2006, autosurfs reached the United States national news when funds of members of 12DailyPro were frozen by payment processor StormPay.

News organizations such as ABC4 (Utah) and WTOC (Georgia) investigated 12DailyPro. In a statement released by the Georgia Government Consumer Protection Agency titled "Pyramid Schemes Never Die; Just Evolve", 12DailyPro was closely scrutinized. Media calls to 12DailyPro owner Charis Johnson went unanswered.

Later in February, 12DailyPro received a cease and desist order by the SEC, who claimed that 95% of the program's funds came from new members. On February 28, the SEC filed a proposed stipulation, agreed to by the attorney for Charis Johnson, LifeClicks, and 12DailyPro that these parties would turn over all assets and records to a permanent legal receiver.

== 2006–present ==
After the demise of 12DailyPro, many other autosurfs collapsed as well; this is widely assumed to be because they invested member funds into 12DailyPro, causing a domino effect. Subsequently, autosurfs have become less popular and are more widely believed to be Ponzi schemes.

Money invested in 12DailyPro is currently being held by a court-ordered payment receiver.
