= Dakota Baptist Convention =

US association of Southern Baptist churches

The Dakota Baptist Convention (DBC) is an autonomous association of Southern Baptist churches in the U.S. states of North Dakota and South Dakota. It is one of the state conventions associated with the Southern Baptist Convention. Headquartered in Rapid City, South Dakota, the convention is made up of seven Baptist associations and around 100 churches as of 2010. DBC was created in 2003.

The organization attracted media attention for giving away a Harley Davidson motorcycle each year at the Sturgis Motorcycle Rally as part of an outreach effort. To qualify for a ticket, a rally attendee had to listen to a three-minute story of how Jesus had changed someone's life.
