= Colorado Baptist General Convention =

The Colorado Baptist General Convention (CBGC) is the autonomous state convention for the U.S. state of Colorado that is under the umbrella of the Southern Baptist Convention. It was formed, in 1955, out of the Arizona Southern Baptist Convention, pursuant to a motion submitted at the Arizona convention by Roy Sutton (at the time a convention staff member who was later to be executive director and treasurer). At the time, the Arizona convention covered a quarter of the whole United States, by area.

== Affiliated organizations ==
- Baptist Foundation of Colorado
- Ponderosa Retreat and Conference Center
- Rocky Mountain Baptist - State Newspaper
- Rocky Mountain Campus of Golden Gate Baptist Theological Seminary
