= Gennady Abramov =

Russian religious leader

Gennady Abramov is a Russian religious leader, who was superintendent of the Union of Evangelical Christians-Baptists of Russia (UECB) in Far East Russia.

== Biography ==
Abramov was regional vice president for the UECB in Russia's Far East, based in the city of Khabarovsk. He had an itinerant ministry, travelling throughout the vast region encouraging the national missionaries and helping to develop churches. In 1992 the region of 10 million people had fewer than 20 Baptist churches, and those were shabby and needing repair. The total number of baptized believers in the region was less than 2,500. However, Abramov was hoping to raise money to build a Far East spiritual center in Khabarovsk with a 600-seat auditorium, with facilities to train pastors and Sunday school teachers from all parts of the Far East. Churches in the region were reporting steady growth, with 423 baptisms in 1991.

In a 1997 interview, visiting Southern Baptist missionary Wayne Kenniston, who works closely with Abramov, said that "Four years ago there may have been 24 Baptist churches in the far east of Russia. Now there are more than 60". In 1998 Abramov attended the 1998 annual meeting of the Alaska Baptist Convention, where a three-year partnership between Baptists in Alaska and Far East Russia was inaugurated.

== See also ==
- Union of Evangelical Christians-Baptists of Russia
