= Gary Sorenson =

Canadian businessman (born 1943)

Gary Allen Sorenson (born 1943 in Calgary, Alberta) is a Canadian businessman who was arrested at Calgary International Airport on September 29, 2009 for an alleged role in a Ponzi scheme that scammed investors of more than C$300 million, the largest in Canada. On July 28, 2015 Gary Sorenson, 71, and Milowe Brost, 61, were sentenced in a Calgary courtroom to 12 years in prison for their elaborate, multimillion-dollar fraud.

== Biography ==
Gary Sorenson was born in Calgary, Alberta in 1943.

Prior to his arrest, he was believed to be residing in a mansion in Honduras just outside the capital of Tegucigalpa. The Alberta Securities Commission, the regulatory agency responsible for administering the province's securities laws, alerted the RCMP about the Ponzi scheme in 2007.

== Allegations ==
Sorenson, and fellow Canadian Milowe Brost, are both accused of deceiving 3,000 people in Canada, the United States, and overseas out of $100 million, and possibly up to $400 million, between 1999 and 2008. According to the Royal Canadian Mounted Police (RCMP), Sorenson and Brost created a business named Syndicated Gold Depository S.A. and then formed an agreement to lend money to Merendon Mining, promising a high rate of return. Investors were then enticed into offshore shell companies marketed by Brost's firms, Capital Alternatives Inc. and Institute for Financial Learning Group of Companies Inc. In the 1980s Sorenson was allegedly involved with persons carrying out illegal distribution of securities in Calgary, Alberta Canada and in importing illegal drugs from west Africa according to information contained in RCMP and Alberta Securities Commission files.

=== Arrest ===
Sorenson was arrested on September 29, 2009, at the Calgary International Airport in Calgary, Alberta. He was charged with fraud and theft over $5,000. Sorenson was brought before a justice of the peace and was released on bail of $150,000 cash or $300,000 surety, though he had to surrender his Canadian passport to authorities and was required to remain in Alberta to report weekly to the RCMP. If convicted, he could face a sentence of up to 14 years.

=== Trial ===
Sorenson and co-accused Milowe Brost stood trial in Calgary in relation to what police described as one of the largest Ponzi-type schemes in Canadian history. During the proceedings, Sorenson dismissed his legal counsel partway through the trial and chose to represent himself. In February 2015, he delivered his own closing argument to the jury, stating that his defence rested on what he described as “the truth” and arguing that the Crown had not proven its case beyond a reasonable doubt. He pleaded not guilty to charges of fraud and theft. Brost also pleaded not guilty and was represented by legal counsel throughout the trial.

=== Conviction ===
In July 2015 Sorenson received a sentence of 12 years for his role in the scheme. The court said Sorenson and his partner bilked more than 2400 investors from around the world of $200–400 million. "The crimes committed by these two offenders are two of the biggest frauds in Canadian history,'' Queen's Bench Justice Robert Hall said in a Calgary courtroom. "They were motivated in my mind by greed with no regard to the effect on the many, many investors they defrauded,'' he added.

After orchestrating the largest Ponzi scheme in Canadian history, Milowe Brost and Gary Sorenson were out of prison after serving just over two years of their 12-year sentences. Because their nine-year crimes began in 1999, before changes to Canadian legislation, Brost and Sorenson were able to apply for parole after serving one-sixth of their sentences.
