= Traffic exchange =

A traffic exchange is a type of website which provides a service for webmasters in exchange for traffic. It is similar to the autosurf concept with the exception that traffic exchanges usually use a manual rotation.

== Concept ==
A traffic exchange website receives website submissions from webmasters that join traffic exchange networks. The person who submitted the website then has to browse other member sites on the exchange program to earn credits, which enable their sites to be viewed by other members through the surf system. This increases the number of visitors to all the sites involved.

Exchanges enforce a certain credit ratio, which illustrates the number of websites the surfer must view in order to receive one hit through the program for their promoted website. Many sites offer the ability to upgrade one's membership level for a more equal credit ratio.

As the viewers are all website owners or affiliates, it is possible that some might find certain member sites interesting and thus make note of them on their own sites, sending more traffic their way. Most traffic programs also impose a time limit when members are browsing, ranging from 10 seconds to 60 seconds. Some incorporate the use of captcha to ensure user interaction.

Almost all traffic exchange programs are free, although many of them offer special features to paid members and offer credits for purchase. Almost all traffic exchange programs encourage users to build their own referral networks, which in turn increases the referrers' number of credits.

The traffic generated in a traffic exchange can be leveraged by using a downline builder to assist the user in building a referral network in the many different traffic exchanges.

In practice, traffic exchange programs are generally used by small business owners or marketers who either want free advertising or use the exchange programs for low-budget advertisement campaigns.

== Traffic exchange vs. bounce rate ==
Most people use traffic exchange programs to increase their site visit rate. Traffic exchange programs offer both the auto and manual surf options with a timing of 3 to 60 seconds. An autosurf program requires no human intervention to rotate the sites in the database, and is used primarily to inflate the total number of site hits. This practice is rather controversial as it may skew the results of website popularity. Peoples' main reason behind joining a traffic exchange program is to promote products and services to like-minded marketers. A factor that may negatively influence the ranking is the bounce Rate. If a website or blog has a high bounce rate then it will be considered that people are not interested in the content. The bounce rate is calculated by the average rate a visitor stayed on the site. So whereas the traffic exchange sites increase the site visit rate, on the other hand they also increase the bounce rate. A higher bounce rate generally harms SEO performance, so using a traffic exchange comes with risks as well.

== AdSense on traffic exchanges ==
Google disallows using AdSense on Traffic Exchanges. Users who wish to advertise their websites on a traffic exchange but also have AdSense ads should create separate pages for advertising in traffic exchanges that do not have AdSense ads. Sending traffic sourced from a traffic exchange to a website monetized using AdSense or other ad networks like Adfly is likely to get the user banned from the network.
