= California Southern Baptist Convention =

State religious convention

The California Southern Baptist Convention (CSBC) is the state convention of the Southern Baptist Convention in California. The CSBC controls and financially supports California Baptist University.

== Leadership ==
CSBC has an annual meeting with messengers from member churches around the state. Churches may only send messengers if they have given funds toward the Cooperative Program or the California Mission Offering within the last year. At this meeting, messengers elect nominated members of the Executive Board. This board oversees the work of CSBC throughout the year and elects the CSBC Executive Director, who leads the day-to-day operations.

CSBC Executive Directors include:

- R.W. Lackey (1940-1944)
- A.F. Crittendon (1945-1950)
- S.G. Posey (1951-1960)
- Grady Cothen (1961-1965)
- Robert D. Hughes (1966-1984)
- C.B. "Bill" Hogue (1985-1994)
- Fermin Whittaker (1995-2017)
- Bill Agee (2017-2022)
- Pete Ramirez (May 2022-present)

== Structure ==
The Business Services Team includes the Chief Financial Officer, Controller, Accountant, and Applications Data Specialist.

The Church Matters Team provides tools and resources for local churches to stay healthy. They focus on church ministries, SBC partnerships, church revitalization, building repair grants, pastoral coaching, pastoral search, and legal matters such as bylaws, mergers, state compliance, insurance, and legacy plans.

The CSBC Communications Team keeps churches informed about ministry in the state and important updates in the convention. This includes the weekly email newsletter (This Week), the Great Commission Collective Podcast, news published on the website, and resources articles from denominational leaders.

Other teams include Evangelism, Missions, and Disaster Relief.

== Name ==
CSBC was founded in 1940 as the Southern Baptist General Convention of California. The convention changed its name to its current name in 1988. Several times in recent decades efforts to change the name of the convention to remove "Southern" have failed.

== Annual Meeting ==
The CSBC Annual Meeting follows Parliamentary Procedures using Robert's Rules of orders. Messengers vote on the order of business, nominate and elect officers, and discuss any motions presented.

Recent meetings are listed below:

Year	Location	Theme	President	Session 1 Video Link	Website Recap
2015	Bakersfield	Until It’s Finished	Randy Bennett		https://csbc.com/news/california-southern-baptists-celebrate-75th-anniversary/
2016	Sacramento	Generations Reaching Generations	Randy Bennett	https://www.youtube.com/watch?v=Ut4qrUCuaXQ	https://csbc.com/news/annual-meeting-features-generations-honors-whittaker-1/
2017	Riverside	Power of One	A.B. Vines		https://csbc.com/news/power-of-one-displayed-during-csbc-annual-meeting-1/
2018	Clovis	Empowering Church Vision	A.B. Vines		https://csbc.com/news/annual-meeting-features-empowering-church-vision/
2019	El Cajon	Step Up	Shawn Beaty		https://csbc.com/news/messengers-challenged-to-step-up-at-annual-meeting/
2020	Meeting cancelled due to COVID-19				https://csbc.com/news/2020-annual-meeting/
2021	Clovis	RE-ENGAGE	Shawn Beaty		https://csbc.com/news/california-baptists-encouraged-to-re-engage-with-communities-church-members-and-state-convention/
2022	West Sacramento	Better Together	Victor Chayasirisobhon	https://acts2.vhx.tv/videos/california-state-convention-better-together-2022-session-one	https://csbc.com/news/california-baptists-celebrate-diversity-partnership-under-better-together-annual-meeting-theme/
2023	Clovis	Better Together For What's Next	Victor Chayasirisobhon	https://acts2.vhx.tv/videos/csbc-annual-meeting-session-1	https://csbc.com/news/2023-annual-meeting-by-the-numbers/
2024	Riverside	For His Glory	Rolland Slade	https://acts2.vhx.tv/videos/csbc-2024-annual-meeting-session-1	https://csbc.com/news/2024-csbc-annual-meeting-by-the-numbers/
2025	Milpitas	United, In Prayer & On Mission	Rolland Slade	https://www.youtube.com/watch?v=LvZalpNHbOc	https://csbc.com/news/2025-csbc-annual-meeting-by-the-numbers/
2026	Highland	Steadfast & Sent	Port Wilburn	https://www.youtube.com/watch?v=AxO-YXv0YQo	
2027	Bakersfield		Port Wilburn		
2028	West Sacramento				
