= Affinity fraud =

Investment fraud where fraudster preys on members of certain groups

Affinity fraud is a form of investment fraud in which the fraudster preys upon members of identifiable groups, such as religious or ethnic communities, language minorities, the elderly, or professional groups. The fraudsters who promote affinity scams frequently are – or successfully pretend to be – members of the group. They often enlist respected community or religious leaders from within the group to spread the word about the scheme, by convincing those people that a fraudulent investment is legitimate and worthwhile. Many times, those leaders become unwitting victims of the fraudster's ruse.

These scams involve exploitation of the trust and friendship that exist in groups of people who have something in common. Because of the tight-knit structure of many groups, it can be difficult for regulators or law enforcement officials to detect an affinity scam. Victims often fail to notify authorities or pursue legal remedies, and instead try to work things out within the group. This is particularly true where the fraudsters have used respected community or religious leaders to convince others to join the investment.

Many affinity scams involve Ponzi schemes or pyramid schemes, where newly received investor money is used by the fraudster to make payments to earlier investors to give the illusion that the investment is successful. This ploy is used to trick new investors to invest in the scheme and to lull existing investors into believing their investments are safe and secure. In reality, the fraudster almost always steals investor money for personal use. Both types of schemes depend on an unending supply of new investors; when the supply of investors inevitably dries up, the whole scheme collapses and investors discover that most or all of their money is gone.

== Examples ==
Affinity frauds can involve the targeting of any group of people who take pride in their shared characteristics, whether they are religious, ethnic, or professional. Agencies such as the U.S. Securities and Exchange Commission have investigated and taken action against affinity frauds targeting a wide spectrum of groups. Some of the cases include the following:

- On November 16, 2007, Michael Owen Traynor a Bradenton, Florida, investment broker who found many of his clients through his church and private school social circles, was arrested on a first degree felony grand theft charge that he had stolen $6.5 million from his investors. It is believed Traynor stole funds from at least 34 clients in Sarasota, Manatee and Hillsborough counties between 2001 and February 2007. Traynor was subsequently sentenced to 12 years in Florida state penitentiary.
- "Armenian-American community loses $19 Million": The SEC's complaint alleges that this affinity fraud targeted Armenian-Americans with little investment experience, for some of whom English was a second language.
- "Criminal charges against South Florida man for $51.9 million fraud": African American victims of this investment scheme were guaranteed that their investments would generate a 30% risk-free and tax-free annual return.
- "'Church Funding Project' costs faithful investors over $3 Million": This nationwide scheme primarily targeted African-American churches and raised at least $3 million from over 1000 investing churches located throughout the U.S. Believing they would receive large sums of money from the investments, many of the church victims committed to building projects, acquired new debt, spent building funds, and contracted with builders.
- "Baptist investors lose over $3.5 Million": The victims of this fraud were mainly African-American Baptists, many of whom were elderly and disabled, as well as a number of Baptist churches and religious organizations located in a number of states. The promoter (Randolph, who was a minister himself and who is currently in jail) promised returns ranging between 7 and 30%, but in reality was operating a Ponzi scheme. In addition to a jail sentence, Randolph was ordered to pay $1 million in the SEC's civil action.
- "More than 1,000 Latin American investors lose over $325 Million": The victims sought low-risk investments. Instead, the promoter (who has been sentenced to 12 years in prison) misappropriated their funds and lied about how much money was in their accounts.
- "125 members of various Christian churches lose $7.4 million": The fraudsters allegedly sold members non-existent "prime bank" trading programs by using a sales pitch heavily laden with Biblical references and by enlisting members of the church communities to unwittingly spread the word about the bogus investment.
- "$2.5 million stolen from 100 Texas senior citizens": The fraudsters obtained information about the assets and financial condition of the elderly victims who were encouraged to liquidate their safe retirement savings and to invest in securities with higher returns. In reality, the fraudsters never invested the money and stole the funds.

On December 11, 2008, Bernard Madoff, an American businessman, was arrested on charges of securities fraud, having been turned in by his sons after allegedly telling them his business was a "giant ponzi scheme". According to the New York Post, Madoff "worked the so-called 'Jewish circuit' of well-heeled Jews he met at country clubs on Long Island and in Palm Beach." Additionally, one of Madoff's middlemen was J. Ezra Merkin of Ascot Partners. According to Samuel G. Freedman of The New York Times, Merkin was prominent in the Modern Orthodox community. This allowed him to defraud institutions such as Yeshiva University, Kehilath Jeshurun Synagogue, the Maimonides School, Ramaz and the SAR Academy.

On July 27, 2009, Earl Jones was arrested for fraud in Montreal. His clients were English-speaking elderly in Quebec where the majority speak French as their first language. On August 14, 2009, CTV and CBC Radio One News reported that investors with Hershey Rosen are also suspected of being defrauded. Like the Jones investors, they too are English-speaking Quebeckers.

A 2012 article in The Economist reports that Utah is believed to have the highest per-capita rate of affinity fraud in the U.S. due to about two-thirds of the state's residents being members of the LDS Church among whom such crimes tend to flourish. Authorities estimate affinity fraud cost Utahns an estimated $1.4 billion in 2010 alone, an average of about $500 per resident. Salt Lake City attorney Mark Pugsley (who specializes in representing white-collar fraud cases) reports that Utah County is the hotbed of financial fraud in the state, particularly the roughly 25-mile corridor from Alpine through Provo. Pugsley suggests a number of factors explain the high rates of affinity fraud in Utah, including members of the LDS Church (also known as Mormons) tending to be overly trusting of those who are or present themselves as members of the church's leadership and thus failing to conduct standard due diligence for investments. In a 2019 analysis, Pugsley applied per-capita figures to a national Ponzi scheme database compiled by attorney Jordan Maglich covering 2008 to 2018. He found that Utah had 1.35 Ponzi schemes per 100,000 people, the highest rate of any state. Florida was next at 0.51. In 2017, a statement from the FBI noted that Utah consistently ranked high in the states with "the most significant white-collar crime cases" and that Utah state legislature established an online registry for convicted fraudsters, hoping to prevent repeat offenses and inform the public.

== See also ==
- Baptist Foundation of Arizona
- Shawn Merriman (fraudster)
