= Hawaii Baptist Academy =

Protestant Christian school in Honolulu, US

Hawaiʻi Baptist Academy
- The Hawaiʻi Baptist Academy seal.

Location
- 2429 Pali Highway; Honolulu, Hawaiʻi 96817; United States

Information
- Type: Protestant Christian
- Motto: "Christ For Every Nation"
- Religious affiliation: Southern Baptist Convention
- Established: 1949
- Grades: Pre-K–12th
- Gender: Coeducational
- Campus type: Urban
- Colors: Gold, Black, White
- Mascot: The Eagle: "Endurance"
- Accreditation: Western Association of Schools and Colleges
- Newspaper: Eagle Eye
- Yearbook: The Light
- Distinctions: One of the largest Protestant Christian schools in Hawaiʻi.
- Website: Hawaii Baptist Academy

Hawaii Baptist Academy (HBA) is a private, co-educational, college-preparatory Christian school that serves grades preschool through twelve on three campuses and a satellite preschool. The school is governed by a board of directors elected by the executive board of the Hawaii Pacific Baptist Convention, an affiliate of the Southern Baptist Convention.

== History ==
In 1944 the Woman's Missionary Union of Virginia pledged $125,000 toward a school in Hawaii. The Southern Baptist Convention Foreign Mission Board began the school in 1947, assigning Southern Baptist Convention missionaries Hugh P. and Mary McCormick to carry out the project.

The school opened in 1949 in surplus Army barracks on a parcel of land purchased at 1234 Heulu Street in Makiki with thirty-six seventh and eighth grade students. It graduated its first students in 1954. The school was transferred to the Hawaii Baptist Convention in 1960. Formerly located near Roosevelt High School in Makiki, it moved to its present location in Nuʻuanu Valley in Honolulu in 1975. In 1987, the elementary school was moved to a second campus one half of a mile away. Hawaii Baptist Academy is accredited by the Western Association of Schools and Colleges and is the largest Baptist school in the state.

Before relocating to the current Middle and High School campus in Nuʻuanu, HBA held court for some time at Makiki Christian Church.

In 1972, the governing body of the Southern Baptist churches authorized purchase of the 9000 sq. ft. Robertson Estate on the Pali Highway for $553,000. Dan Kong resigned his ministry at Olivet Baptist Church in order to become vice president and Development Director of the school in 1973. In order to raise funding for the purchase, Kong and Hawaii Baptist Academy president Stan Sagert began a fund raising tour among potential mainland donors and institutions. By 1977, they had created the Mainland Advisory Council. Overall, mainland contributions have accounted for 70 percent of campus building costs.

The Nuʻuanu Campus, now called the Stan Sagert Campus, welcomed its first students in 1975 with the class of 1976 being the first to graduate from the new campus. The elementary campus shared grounds with Central Baptist Church until it moved to the former Sacred Hearts Convent in Nuʻuanu. HBA also had a small elementary campus in Nānākuli (West Oʻahu), located at Nānākuli Baptist Church. This campus was relocated to property in Waiʻanae in the mid-1980s, where it remained until it was eventually closed in 1997.

== Current ==
In 2006, HBA opened the Dan Kong Middle School Campus, adjacent to the current high school campus and named in honor of Dan Kong, former president of Hawaii Baptist Academy and pastor of various churches around the island, including First Baptist Church of Wahiawa, Olivet Baptist Church, and Central Baptist Church. He helped form organizations such as the Mainland Advisory Council, which consists of donors from the U.S. mainland.

The middle school campus consists of 14 classrooms, a computer lab, two specially equipped science classrooms, and a multi-purpose room for middle school students. The HBA Middle School Campus was designed by the firm of Walters, Kimura, Motoda and it has been noted to be a LEED gold facility since it was designed to be environmental friendly and sustainable.

Since 1997, HBA has operated under a modified school calendar, with two-week breaks in October, December, and March, and a two-month summer break in June and July.

Beginning with the 2007–08 school year, a uniform dress standard with school-endorsed polo shirts, skirts, and pants was instituted. The original uniform polo shirts were embroidered with "HBA" on the left sleeve, and were available in black, white, green, and yellow. The uniforms were updated in the 2016–17 school year with the removal of the embroidered letters, the elimination of green and yellow polo shirts, and the addition of a large school logo on the left breast.

Hawaii Baptist Academy's middle school robotics team placed fifth out of 104 middle school teams in the 2011 VEX Robotics World Championships in Orlando held April 14 to 16. Three of the top five teams in the Orlando championship came from China. In third place was a team from Arizona.

In 2017, eighth grader Logan Kakugawa won the Hawaii State Geographic Bee and represented the state of Hawaii at the national competition in Washington, D.C. During the same year, the high school's Mock Trial team celebrated their first state championship.

In 2020, HBA introduced a junior kindergarten program at the elementary campus. In 2022, they announced a partnership with GracePoint church in Mililani to open a satellite preschool. Together, the Nuʻuanu and Mililani early learning centers serve preschool students from ages two to five.

== Campuses ==
The Richard Bento, Dan Kong, and Stan Sagert campuses house the elementary, middle, and high schools, respectively. The elementary campus and GracePoint Church in Mililani house the two early learning centers. The digital school is headquartered on the high school campus. The administrative headquarters are in a separate location. All campuses other than the GracePoint preschool are in the Honolulu census-designated place.

== Scandals ==
In 2009, Jeremy Ryan Duffer, who had been previously employed by HBA as a part-time Bible teacher, was arrested in Virginia and accused of multiple counts of consensual sex with a juvenile. Duffer subsequently pleaded guilty in 2010 to one count of an indecent act with a child as well as eight counts of aggravated sexual battery, and is currently serving a 17-year sentence. HBA President Richard Bento remarked that Duffer's arrest was "shocking," and that he was personally unaware of any suspicions or allegations against Duffer at the time of his employment with the school.

In 2012, Hawaii News Now reported that a male teacher at HBA had allegedly engaged in sexual relations with a 17-year-old male senior student. According to the report, one sexual encounter was alleged to have occurred at Pu'u Kahea Conference Center, a camping facility in Waianae at which students from grades 7 through 12 spend time annually. The teacher, who had been employed for two years, resigned due to the allegations. The report notes that HBA maintains a strict religious code of conduct that explicitly forbids homosexual behavior as "sexually immoral."

== Presidents ==
- + Hugh P. McCormick
- Stanley A. Sagert (1970–1987)
- Ronald D. Boggs (1987–1988)
- Daniel H. C. Kong (1988–1993)
- Richard T. Bento (1993–2016)
- Ronald Shiira (2016–Present)

+ Title of Superintendent was changed to President during Stanley A. Sagert's leadership.
