= Alaska Baptist Resource Network =

Autonomous association of U.S. Baptist churches

Coordinates: 61°07′21.8″N 149°50′55″W

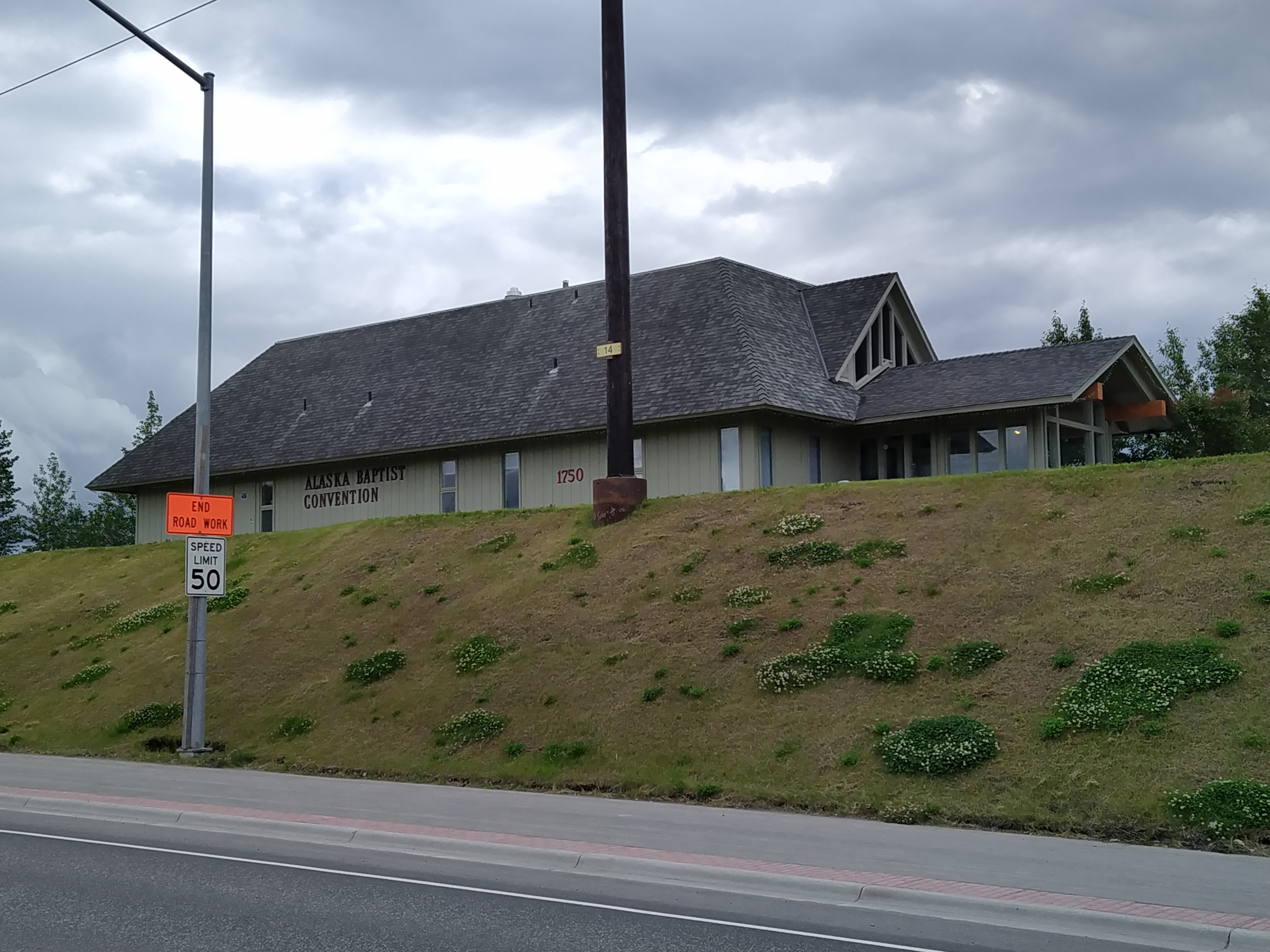
Alaska Baptist Resource Network headquarters in Anchorage viewed from O'Malley Road.

The Alaska Baptist Resource Network (ABRN) is an autonomous association of Baptist churches located in the U.S. state of Alaska. It is one of the state conventions associated with the Southern Baptist Convention. The first Southern Baptist church in Alaska was established in 1943, with just 17 members, and the Network was formed in 1946.

== History ==
The first Southern Baptist church in Alaska was First Baptist Church, Anchorage, organized in September 1943. The new church had 17 members, including two civilians and 15 soldiers. The church was founded by soldiers at nearby Fort Richardson, and later started a number of sister churches in Alaska. The Alaska Baptist Convention was formed in 1946 as the union of several Alaskan Baptist churches. Although it petitioned the Southern Baptist Convention (SBC) for recognition as a state convention in 1947, the SBC did not formally recognize the ABC until 1951, after the ABC had submitted a second petition for recognition in 1950. An amendment to the SBC's constitution had been required in order to allow the ABC, and several other small state conventions, to become associated with the SBC. In the meantime, in 1948, the ABC had received assistance from the SBC's Home Mission Board.

In the first half of the 20th century, most African American Baptists were members of churches unaffiliated with the SBC. Greater Friendship Baptist Church in Anchorage was an exception, voting to affiliate with the SBC in 1951. In 1997, this church's 11th pastor, Leon D. May, was elected president of the Alaska Baptist Convention.

In January 1975, the ABC held a three-day Evangelistic conference with the theme of "Reconciliation Through Christ" in preparation for the annual Simultaneous Revivals scheduled for March of that year. 48 Baptist missions and churches participated in the "Proclamation 76" revivals in 1976. The ABC's budget rose above $1 million for the first time in 1981. In January 1982, the Convention elected John H. Allen as their new executive director to succeed Allen Meeks, who was retiring for health reasons. Meeks had previously been education director of First Baptist Church, Anchorage and director of religious education for the Alaska Baptist Convention. At their annual meeting in August 1997, the ABC endorsed a recent SBC resolution to boycott the Disney Company for moral stewardship reasons in light of what they called an anti-family direction taken by the entertainment conglomerate.

Gennady Abramov, superintendent of the Russian Baptist Federation in Far East Russia attended the 1998 annual meeting, where a three-year partnership between Baptists in Alaska and Far East Russia was inaugurated. The budget approved at the meeting was $1,723,226. By 1999, total resident membership was 10,096. At the ABC's annual meeting in August 2000, the executive director Cloyd Sullins retired after five year in office, handing over to David Baldwin. In his retirement speech, Sullins said that evangelism and missions are major priorities for the ABC due to the partnership with Far East Russia.

As of 2000, there were 68 Southern Baptist congregations in Alaska with 22,959 adherents, making it the largest Protestant denomination and second largest Christian denomination after the Catholic Church which had 54,359 adherents. By November 2003, there were 73 Alaska Baptist churches and 28 missions. The ABC was assisted between 2000 and 2004 by the Baptist State Convention of North Carolina, which sent 5,667 volunteers to assist in growth of the Alaska organization during that period. Total membership had risen to 16,506 in 2004.

In 2021, it was renamed Alaska Baptist Resource Network.

== Organization ==
The mission of the Network is to assist, challenge, and encourage affiliated churches and associations to fulfill the Great Commission, to spread the word of Jesus Christ. The Chugach, Hatcher Pass, Tanana Valley and Tongass Baptist Associations are affiliated to the ABC. The Network's trust agency, the Alaska Baptist Foundation, raises and manages endowment funds, providing support to Alaska and Southern Baptist agencies, institutions and causes. Alaska Baptist Family Services, an agency established by the Network and three established Southern Baptist churches in 1946, operates an orphanage for children in need, including the severely mentally disturbed.

The Wayland Baptist University has an Anchorage campus that is affiliated with the ABC. Although it is a Christian, faith-based institution, it is open to people of all faiths.
