= Matrix scheme =

Type of financial fraud

A matrix scheme (also known as a matrix sale or site, and as a hellevator, excavator or ladder scheme) is a business model involving the exchange of money for a certain product with a side bonus of being added to a waiting list for a product of greater value than the amount given. Matrix schemes are also sometimes considered similar to Ponzi or pyramid schemes. They have been called "unsustainable" by the United Kingdom's Office of Fair Trading. A matrix scheme is also an example of an "exploding queue'"in queueing theory.

== History ==
The first known matrix scheme is widely believed to be EZExpo.com, which started the popularity of matrix schemes in 2002. By 2003 more than 200 matrix schemes were in operation, including one which had the same owner as the payment processor StormPay (TymGlobal). Subsequently, both TymGlobal and StormPay were accused of running an illegal Ponzi scheme. StormPay later claimed to be independent of TymGlobal, and they stopped accepting matrix schemes as customers. Although many have since ceased trading, some schemes are still known to be operating worldwide. The payment processor, StormPay, is no longer trading.

== Operation ==
The operation of matrix schemes varies, though they often operate similarly to pyramid or Ponzi schemes. Some of the former participants of these schemes consider them to be a form of confidence trick, although others are happy with their purchase.

To move upward in the list, a person must wait for new members to join or refer a certain number of people to the list. This is accomplished through purchasing a token product of marginal value: usually e-books, cell phone boosters, screen savers, or other software CDs/DVDs. When a pre-defined number of people have purchased the token product, the person currently at the top of the list receives their reward item, and the next person in the list moves to the top. The rewards for those at the top of the matrix list are usually high-demand consumer electronics, such as portable digital audio players, high-definition television sets, laptops, and cellphones. Reaching the point on the list where one receives the expensive goods is termed "cycling".

In many cases, the token product alone could not be reasonably sold for the price listed, and as such legal experts claim that, regardless of what is said, the real product being sold is the "reward" in question in those situations. In these cases, the operator could be charged with running a gambling game or failing to supply ordered products. Steven A. Richards, a lawyer who represents multi-level marketing (MLM) companies for Grimes & Reese in Idaho Falls, Idaho, has stated that often there are no clear legal tests for Ponzi schemes. But if the product sold has no value or very little value, and consumers wouldn't buy it without the attached gift, the scheme probably runs afoul of federal and state laws.

The "Matrix List" by which the sites receive their name would be what is known as a straight-line matrix, or one-by-X matrix. This is similar to many MLMs that use Y-by-X matrices to fill a down-line.

For example, one situation may be a one-by-10 matrix for a video game console (a common reward). In such a matrix the site would usually sell an e-book for $50 to be placed on the list. After nine additional people purchased a spot, the first person would receive either a video game console (or cash value equivalent) and would be removed from the list. The person who had been second would move up to the first spot and an additional 10 people would have to purchase spots in order for that person to receive a console. It is this orderly movement which has also given the name "elevator scheme" to these sites, as people move up the "elevator" (escalator, ladder) to the top at which they would then "cycle" out of the matrix.

In such a matrix, 9 out of 10, or 90 percent, of all customers will not receive the reward item, because the rules of the scheme are that one reward is issued for every 10 customers that join. (The fact that the reward is issued to the customer at the top of the list doesn't change the proportion of rewards given to customers signed up.) Supporters claim that additional revenue streams from advertising are used to keep the lists moving. However, detractors claim that it is impossible to generate enough outside revenue. If the entire world were to join the list, 90 percent of the world would be unable to cycle if the site did not draw sufficient alternate revenue streams. Adding more people to the list does not change the fact that the majority would receive nothing without these streams.

Additionally, the amount of time needed before a given individual will receive the product in question is often mistaken. In a matrix in which 10 people must sign up before cycling, the first person to join only needs nine additional sign-ups to cycle, but the second person needs 18 additional sign-ups: eight more for the person above them, and then 10 more for themself. The third person on the list likewise needs 27 additional signups: seven for the person on top of the list, 10 for the person directly above them, and then 10 for themself. The number of people required continues to grow for each new person joining the list. For the 10th person to cycle a total of 100 people would have to sign up, 1000 for the 100th, and so on.

Through this process, the matrix scheme generates substantial profit for its organiser. At the time of its popularity, for example, a PlayStation 2 cost a maximum of $299. After selling 10 $50 e-books, the organiser could make $500, and could purchase a PS2 for $299 to send to the first bidder while retaining a $201 of capital in return. But the schemer must take in consideration the actual price of an e-book which could be around $10. Finally, the buyer would have a profit of $101 (=201-10×10) This same process could be repeated every time the matrix cycles; if the matrix cycled 10 times, the organiser would have sold $5000 worth of e-books, of which $2990 would have been spent on 10 PS2s, leaving them with a revenue of $2010, and a profit of $1010.

== In queueing theory ==
A matrix scheme is easily represented as a simple M/M/1 queue within the context of queueing theory. In such a system there is a Markovian arrival, Markovian service, and one single server. In the standard matrix queue, service rates are a function of arrival rates since the time to cycle out of the queue is based on the entry fee into the matrix from arriving members. Also, since members move through the matrix in single file, it is easy to associate the single server.

The basic premise of queueing theory is that when arrival rates equal or exceed service rates, overall waiting time within the queue moves towards infinity.

The basic formulation includes three formulae. The traffic intensity, ρ, is the average arrival rate (λ) divided by the average service rate (μ):

$\rho = \lambda / \mu$

The mean number of customers in the system (N):

$N = \rho / (1 - \rho)$

And the total waiting time within the queue (T):

$T = 1 / (\mu - \lambda )$

It is possible to see that as arrival rates rise towards service rates, the total waiting time (T) and mean number of customers in the system (N) will move towards infinity. Since service time can never exceed the arrival time in the standard matrix, and total waiting time can only be defined if service times exceed arrival times, the only way for the matrix queue to reach stability is for outside income sources to exceed those being entered into the system.

== Legality ==
Currently there are no laws specifically naming matrix schemes illegal in the US. However, the US Federal Trade Commission has issued warnings to the public about these sites. Additionally, the US Federal Trade Commission and the UK Trading Standards have issued warnings to the public regarding the ease with which these models can be manipulated for fraudulent purposes. Many of the original matrix sites, including EZExpo.com, are no longer in operation; some of them closed down while defending civil lawsuits. In 2003 EZExpo and several payment processors were sued in the civil courts for running an illegal lottery in the state of California, with the payment processors abetting the scam. However, the civil case is still ongoing. One result of the lawsuit is that those payment processors and some others no longer accept matrix schemes as customers. Currently, no legal precedent exists regarding the matrix scheme in the US.

In the UK, the Office of Fair Trading has declared some of them to be illegal. On 1 July 2005, two matrix sites, pulsematrix.com and phones4everyone (themobilematrix.com), were declared to be running a form of illegal lottery. These two sites promptly closed down as part of a settlement agreement with the Office of Fair Trading (OFT). Other similar matrix sites also used this decision to close down their sites. A few UK matrix sites carried on by utilising contractual law to trade legally, with one major site carrying on until May 2006 when it was sold to a company in Denmark. In the UK there is no specific law against matrix sites.

Other countries may have different laws regarding these matrix sites, but information is unavailable at this time.
