= Convention of Southern Baptist Churches in Puerto Rico =

Group of churches affiliated with the Southern Baptist Convention

The Convention of Southern Baptist Churches in Puerto Rico (Spanish: Convención de Iglesias Bautistas del Sur de Puerto Rico) (CSBPR) is a group of churches affiliated with the Southern Baptist Convention located in the U.S. territory of Puerto Rico.

== History ==
The convention has its origins in a mission of the North American Mission Board in 1964. It was officially founded in 1965 as Association of Southern Baptist Churches. In 2001, it became a convention and a member of the Southern Baptist Convention.

== See also ==
- Southern Baptist Convention
- List of state and other conventions associated with the Southern Baptist Convention
