= Baptist State Convention of Michigan =

Church convention

The Baptist State Convention of Michigan is a group of churches affiliated with the Southern Baptist Convention located in the U.S. state of Michigan. It is headquartered in Plymouth, Michigan.

In 2025, the convention is made up of 13 associations; the director is Timothy Patterson.

== Affiliated organizations ==
- Bambi Lake Baptist Retreat and Conference Center
- Michigan Southern Baptist Foundation
- The Beacon - the state newspaper
