= Arizona Southern Baptist Convention =

- Formation: 1928
- Type: Religious organization
- Region served: Arizona, United States
- Members: 126,830 (as of 2010)
- Affiliations: Southern Baptist Convention
- Website: azsbc.org

The Arizona Southern Baptist Convention (ASBC) is an autonomous association of Baptist churches in the U.S. state of Arizona. It is one of the state conventions associated with the Southern/Great Commission Baptists.

== History ==
The ASBC was officially formed in 1928 but its origins are in the division between the Arizona Baptist Convention and the Northern Baptist Convention some years earlier, starting in March 1917 when a group of Baptists who objected to the liberal positions being held by the ABC, left the First Baptist Church of Phoenix and formed the Calvary Baptist Church of Phoenix. The pastor of the new church was C. M. Rock, who came from Asheville, North Carolina. On March 27, 1921, with Rock as their pastor, a group of people left the Calvary Baptist Church to form the First Southern Baptist Church, as a protest against the Northern Convention's stances on open communion, alien immersion, and interdenominational comity. In August of the same year, this new church joined the Southwestern Baptist Association of New Mexico.

On September 21, 1928, Rock led the formation of the Baptist General Convention of Arizona. In May 1929, this was associated with the Southern Baptist Convention. It retained the name Baptist General Convention of Arizona until 1961, when it changed its name to the Arizona Southern Baptist Convention.

As of 2010 there were 404 Southern Baptist congregations in Arizona, with 126,830 adherents; this is the third most congregations of all religious body in the state, fourth most adherents, and 27th by average adherents per congregation.

== Affiliated organizations ==
- Arizona Baptist Children's Services
- Arizona Campus of Gateway Seminary
- Arizona Christian Challenge
- Arizona Woman's Missionary Union
- Historical Commission, AZSBC

== See also ==
- Baptist Foundation of Arizona
