= Nevada Baptist Convention =

Group of Southern Baptist churches in Nevada, USA

The Nevada Baptist Convention is a group of churches affiliated with the Southern Baptist Convention located in the U.S. state of Nevada. Headquartered in Reno, Nevada, the convention is made up of 3 Baptist associations as of 2023.

In 2025, the director is Damian Cirincione.

It was made up of around 315 churches as of 2020.

== Affiliated organizations ==
- Nevada Baptist Foundation
- The Nevada Baptist - the state newspaper
