= Minnesota-Wisconsin Baptist Convention =

The Minnesota-Wisconsin Baptist Convention (MWBC) is a group of churches affiliated with the Southern Baptist Convention located in the U.S. states of Minnesota and Wisconsin. The convention was established in 1983 and headquartered in Rochester, Minnesota, the convention is made up of 6 Baptist associations and around 195 churches as of 2025.

== Affiliated organizations ==
- Minnesota-Wisconsin Baptist Foundation
- Minnesota-Wisconsin Baptist - the state newspaper
