= Kansas–Nebraska Convention of Southern Baptists =

The Kansas-Nebraska Convention of Southern Baptists (KNCSB) is a group of churches affiliated with the Southern Baptist Convention located in the U.S. state of Kansas and Nebraska. Headquartered in Topeka, Kansas, the convention is made up of 12 Baptist associations and more than 465 churches as of 2021.

== Beliefs ==
The Kansas-Nebraska Convention of Southern Baptist believes that the Bible is the verbally inspired Word of God and is sufficient as the only infallible rule of faith and practice. The convention is also supportive of The Baptist Faith and Message 2000 which was adopted by the Southern Baptist Convention.

== Cooperative Program ==
The Kansas-Nebraska Convention of Southern Baptist participates in the Cooperative Program (CP). CP is described as a tool used by God to empower the witness of Baptists in Kansas and Nebraska. Every Southern Baptist Church in these two states is challenged to give 10% of all her tithes and offerings through the Cooperative Program. These funds are then pooled with other church gifts from Kansas and Nebraska. State convention staff collect the funds and distribute some for missions work in Kansas and Nebraska while the rest is forwarded on to the Southern Baptist Convention (SBC) Executive Committee. The SBC then uses gifts collected from all SBC state conventions and other sources, to fund missions in the United States as well as send missionaries around the world. The Cooperative Program provides the opportunity for even the smallest church to be a part of fulfilling the Great Commission.

== Affiliated organizations ==
- Webster Conference Center
- The Baptist Digest - the state newspaper
