= Baptist Convention of New Mexico =

Baptist churches group in New Mexico

Coordinates: 35°8′28.2″N 106°33′6.4″W

The Baptist Convention of New Mexico is a group of churches affiliated with the Southern Baptist Convention located in New Mexico.

Headquartered in Albuquerque, New Mexico, the convention is made up of 13 Baptist associations in 2025. In 2025, the director was Steve Ballew.

In 2010, it had around 325 churches.

== Affiliated organizations ==
- The Baptist New Mexican - the state newspaper
- Church Finance Corporation
- Inlow Baptist Camp and Conference Center
- New Mexico Baptist Children's Home
- New Mexico Baptist Foundation
- Sivells Baptist Retreat and Conference Center
