= West Virginia Convention of Southern Baptists =

The West Virginia Convention of Southern Baptist (WVCSB) is a group of churches affiliated with the Southern Baptist Convention located in the U.S. state of West Virginia. Headquartered in Scott Depot, West Virginia, the convention is made up of 10 Baptist associations and around 221 churches as of 2021.
