= Shawn Merriman (fraudster) =

American convicted fraudster (born 1963)

Shawn Richard Merriman
- Born: 1963 (age 62–63)
- Education: Brigham Young University (Utah)
- Occupation: Former investment adviser
- Years active: 1994 - 2009
- Known for: Operating a Ponzi scheme
- Criminal charges: Mail fraud, affinity fraud (September 14, 2010)
- Criminal penalty: 151 months in prison
- Criminal status: Released in 2020
- Spouse(s): Andrea (m. 1989; div. 201?)
- Children: 4

Shawn Richard Merriman, born in 1963, is a former American investment adviser and lay leader in The Church of Jesus Christ of Latter-day Saints (LDS Church). He ran his scheme for more than fifteen years, roughly from 1994 to 2009. Following his conviction for operating a $20 million Ponzi scheme, which has been widely reported in the media as one of the significant examples of affinity fraud in the American West, he attracted the attention of media. Shawn Merriman was convicted of mail fraud and was sentenced to 151 months in federal prison in 2010. Media outlets have referred to him as the "Mormon Madoff", a reference to financier Bernard Madoff. Merriman attracted investors through relationships within his religious and community circles. Using personal trust and shared religious affiliation, he created investor confidence systematically, a method that extended the fraud's life. His story is a point of reference in studies of financial fraud, fiduciary duty, and community trust.

== Background and early life ==
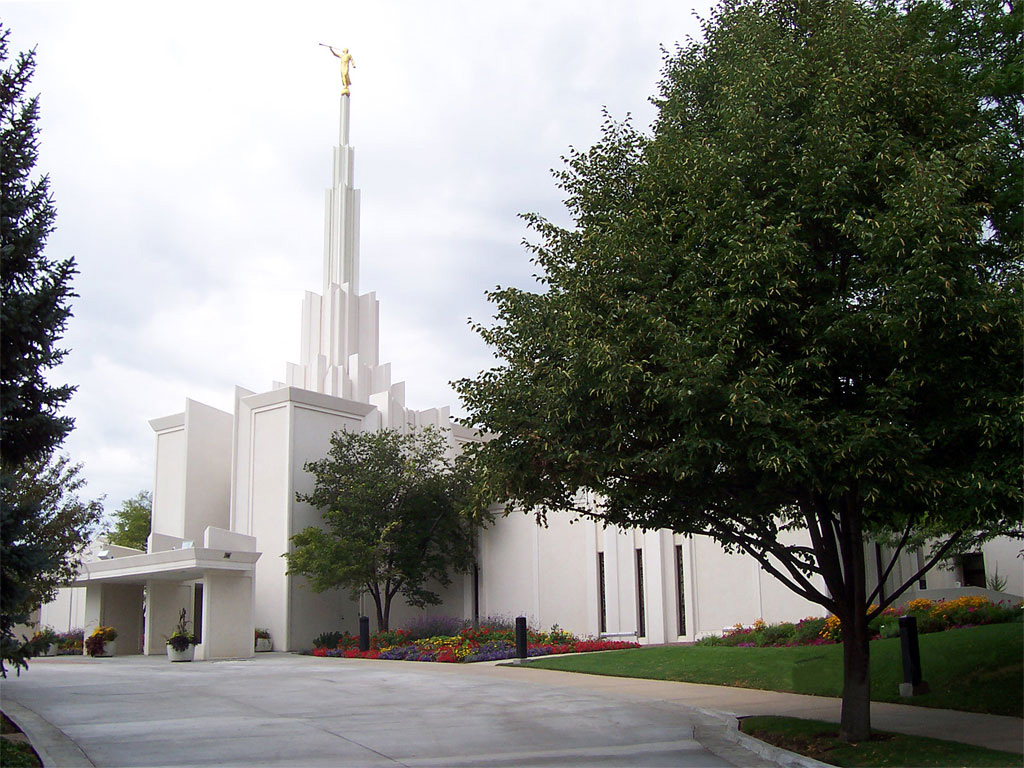
The Church of Jesus Christ of Latter-day Saints Temple in Centennial, Colorado, where Merriman served as a lay bishop

Shawn Merriman lived in Utah when he met Andrea Merriman at Brigham Young University in Provo. They married on August 5, 1989, and had four children. Both were members of the LDS Church. After their marriage, the couple relocated to Denver, Colorado where Shawn Merriman completed his master's in business. He reportedly pursued the degree to enhance his career, although it was not required for his profession.

Merriman began his career as an investment banker and earned income for his employment. By 1993, the couple had their first child and moved to a neighborhood in Aurora, Colorado. As his career progressed, Merriman presented himself as financially stable and professionally successful, which coincided with the growth of his private investment practice.

He subsequently left his employment to establish Market Street Advisors, stating that several wealthy clients had requested that he manage their finances independently. The firm operated from the Merrimans’ home, where Merriman converted the basement into a private office to maintain discretion.

During this period, Merriman also served as a lay bishop in his local Latter-day Saints congregation, a voluntary leadership role. Media reports and later investigations indicated that his position in the church contributed to community trust, which facilitated investor recruitment for his advisory business.

Andrea Merriman later stated that, from an external perspective, the family’s life appeared financially stable and respected within the church. She reported that she had no reason to question her husband’s professional activities, as they appeared legitimate, and was not aware of the fraudulent operations conducted in his private office.

== Orchestration of Ponzi scheme ==
From 1994 and 2009, Shawn R. Merriman operated a long-running investment fraud through his advisory firm, Market Street Advisors, and several related entities he controlled, such as Mountain Spring Partners. These related shell companies included Market Street Advisors, LLC-1, LLC-2, Marque LLC-3 and LLC-4. Presenting himself as an investment adviser, Merriman accepted investments from investors across various U.S states. He falsely claimed he would invest their money in stocks, bonds, and other securities to generate stable returns. In reality, investigators later reported that he conducted little to no legitimate trading activity. To sustain the fraud, he provided investors with fabricated account statements showing regular profits and steady growth.

According to the U.S. Securities and Exchange Commission (SEC) and the U.S. Attorney's Office for the District of Colorado, Merriman used funds from new investors to pay earlier investors and diverted investor capital for personal use. The investigation later revealed that the investors' funds were used to purchase luxury goods, automobiles, fine art, and other personal outlays.

As his operation expanded, Merriman's method is cited as a key example of affinity fraud. His status as a lay bishop in the Latter-day Saints community was referenced in investigations as a factor in investor trust, allowing him to take advantage of the community's shared faith and close-knit social structure. Consequently, many of his investors were members of his local congregation or belonged to the broader Latter-day Saints community in Colorado and Utah, trusting him based on his reputation as a successful financial professional and church leader.

His then-wife, Andrea Merriman, later stated that just after he had already turned himself in to federal investigators, he admitted to her that his investment business was a Ponzi scheme and that he defrauded investors of about $20 million. After that she faced an FBI investigation, but was later discharged. Andrea Merriman then divorced her husband.

Shawn Merriman was indicted in 2010 on multiple counts of mail fraud by the U.S. Attorney’s Office for Colorado, under Title 18, Section 1341 of the U.S. Code. The S.E.C. later issued a permanent order barring him from working with investment advisers, brokers or dealers in the future.

== Sentencing ==
By the mid-1990s, Merriman began accruing money from private clients and investors through his company, Market Street Advisors, and other companies he owned. Customers were lured in with promises of executed trades and consistent returns. However, the investment activities Merriman described in detail to his clients never actually existed and were fabricated. He later claimed he was not actually trading money and diverted funds from investors to his own personal expenses. To maintain the illusion, Merriman would send clients fabricated financial statements.

By 2009, he had taken in a significant number of investors and resulted in losses exceeding $20 million, all the while Merriman was still running the scheme. Finally in early 2009, Merriman contacted the United States Attorney's Office and admitted running a Ponzi scheme for many years. He also expressed an intention to give several million dollars to be liquidated so that some of the money could be returned to the investors. Later that year, Merriman took responsibility for one case of mail fraud and pleaded guilty in the United States District Court for the District of Colorado.

In September of 2010, the court sentenced him to 151 months in prison; three years of supervised release. He also owed money in restitution that amounted to $20,124,183.13 dollars. After the sentence was imposed, Merriman took issue with some of the findings of fact incorporated in the court's decision. He claimed to the Tenth Circuit Court of Appeals, that the assets he had given to the government before the sentence had been overlooked in the loss calculation and also contested the evidence. The court rejected his appeal, ruling that post-discovery asset returns do not alter the federal loss calculation. The conviction and sentence were subsequently affirmed.

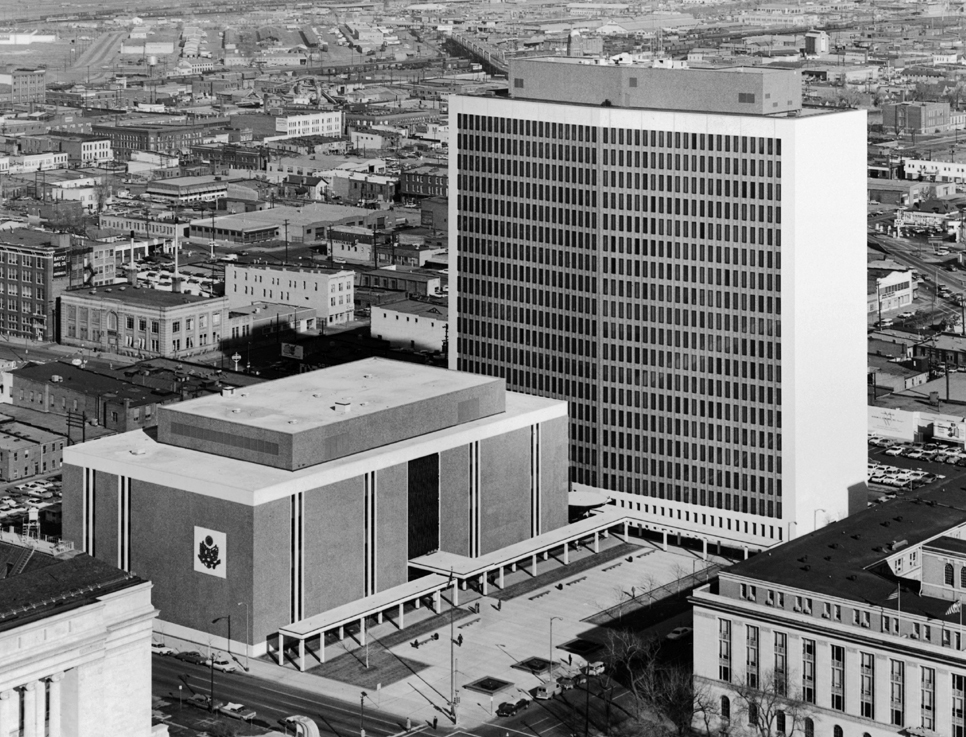
The courthouse where Shawn Merriman was convicted, Colorado

=== Victims' compensation ===
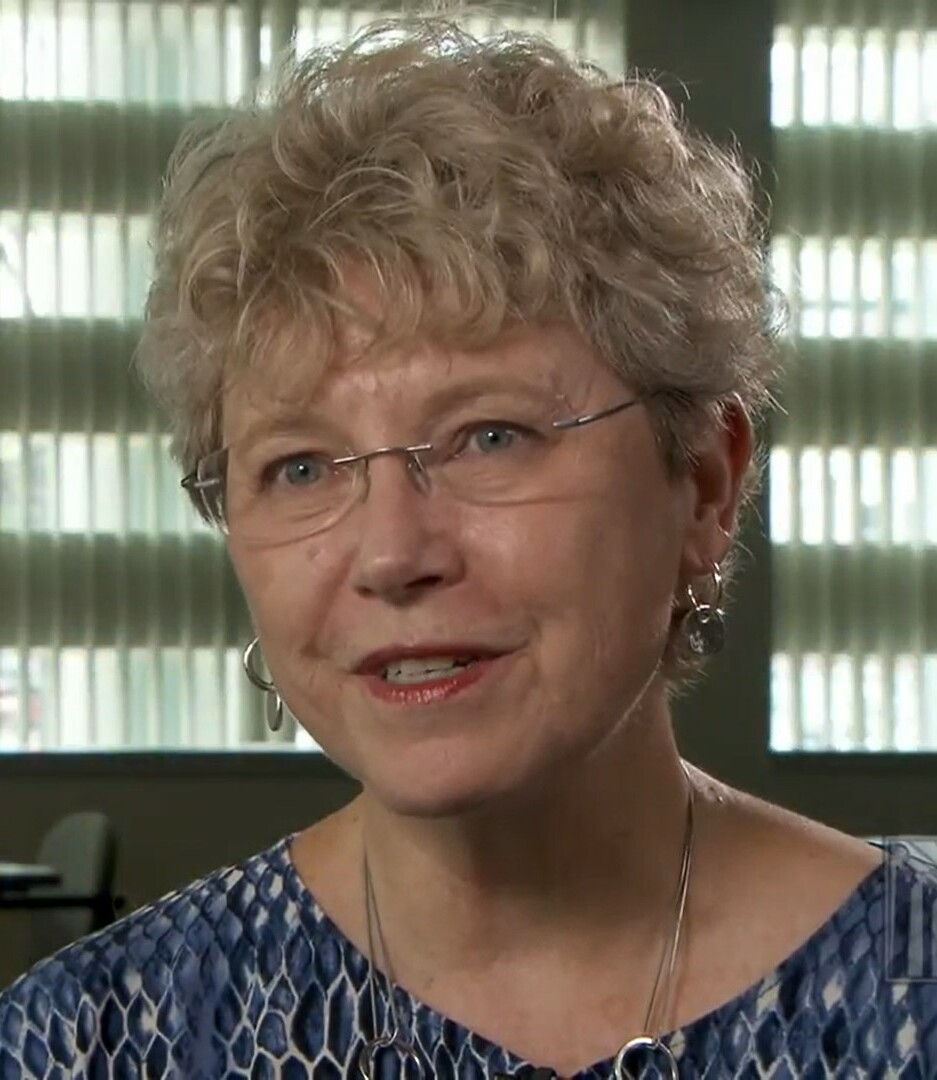
Marcia S. Krieger, the judge who approved the liquidation of Merriman's assets

On September 14, 2010, U.S. District Court Judge Marcia S. Krieger, who oversaw the liquidation of Merriman’s assets, approved a court-supervised liquidation plan to compensate the victims of the fraud.

All of the following assets were owned by Shawn Merriman and purchased with money obtained through the fraud scheme:

- Fine art collections, including 157 pieces of Old Masters work and 170 works of contemporary art;
- Additional art and collectibles, such as 43 framed works, 4 bronze busts, and an acrylic sculpture;
- Real estate holdings, including Merriman’s primary residence in Aurora, Colorado, and a property in Island Park, Idaho;
- Vehicles and conveyances, encompassing classic and collectible cars (such as a 1930 Lincoln, a silver Aston Martin, 1932 and 1936 Auburns, and a 1932 Ford Highboy), motorcycles, a boat, motor home, trailers, and a John Deere Bobcat;
- Financial accounts, including eight E*Trade securities accounts;
- Personal and recreational property, such as sports memorabilia, firearms, taxidermy, exercise equipment, arcade games, tools, safes, hunting paraphernalia, and a pitching machine.

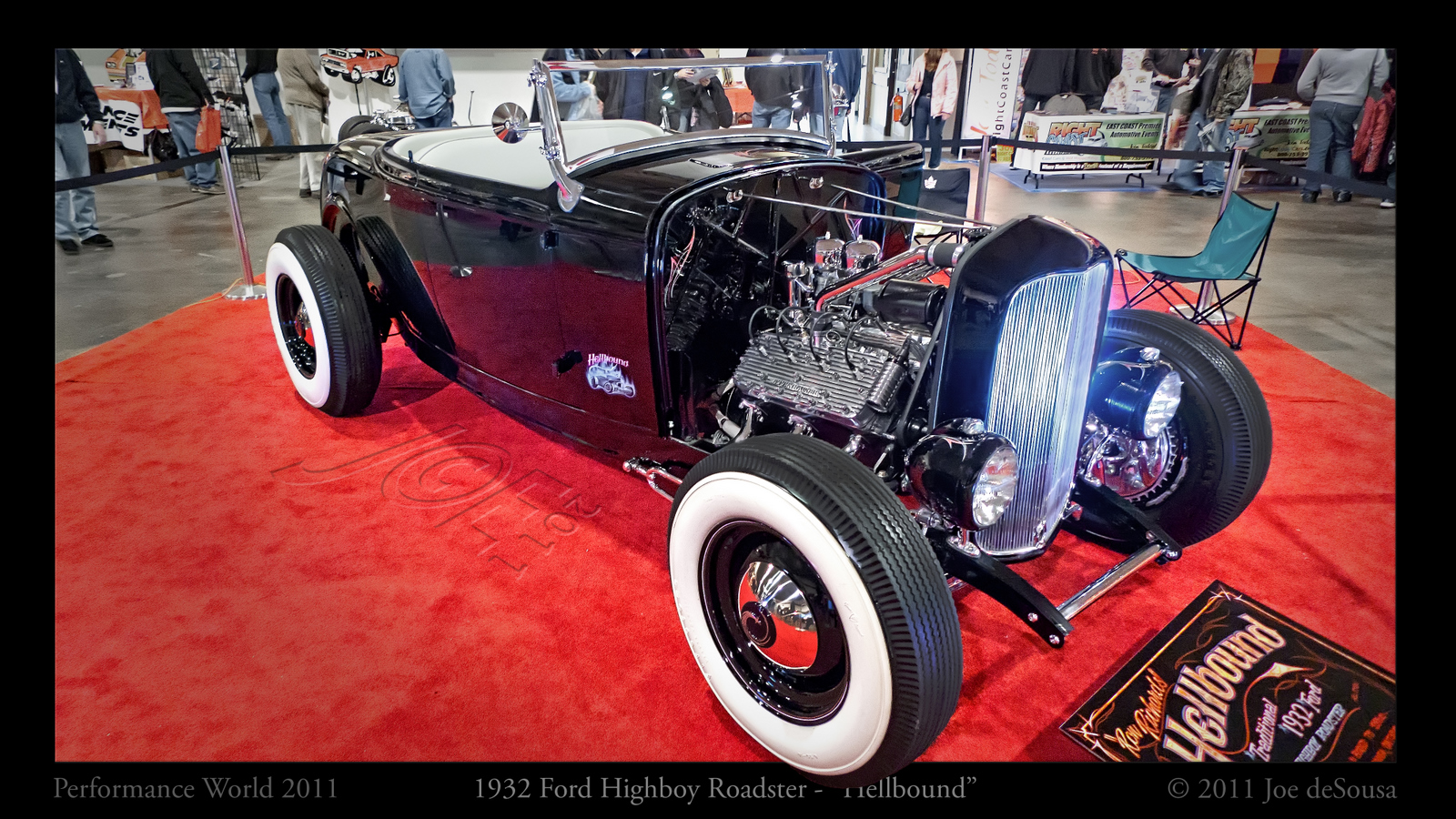
A 1932 Ford Highboy. One of the cars in Merriman's private collection.

In July 2013, disbursement began, providing victims approximately 16.5 cents per dollar of losses claimed. The initial round of payments, totaling around $30,000 from the sale of Merriman's property in Idaho and related assets, was distributed to around 50 victims who qualified for payment of $100 or more. Individual checks were worth between $300 and $3,000.

A second and larger distribution of about $3.3 million followed on July 29, 2013, benefiting up to 94 victims. According to the Justice Department spokesman Jeff Dorschner, the U.S. Marshals Service chose not to issue smaller checks to simplify and expedite the process.

=== Auctions ===
The first auction of Shawn Merriman's seized property was held on January 29, 2011, organized by Dickensheets & Associates in Denver, Colorado. The auction was conducted under the supervision of federal authorities and followed standard asset-liquidation procedures. The public event attracted a significant turnout of bidders, collectors, and media representatives. The auction included items such as vintage automobiles, motorcycles, trailers, and a range of industrial and recreational equipment.

A separate online auction of Merriman's art collection was conducted by the U.S. Marshals Service through Texas Auction & Realty (Dallas, Texas), concluding on July 2, 2012. The online format was selected due to the volume and delicate nature of the artworks, allowing participation from bidders in different regions. This sale included the 157 pieces, including approximately 40 works attributed to or after Rembrandt and Albrecht Dürer. Each item was individually cataloged by the auction house, in accordance with standard federal procedures for the disposal of seized cultural property.

== In popular culture ==
In 2012, Shawn Merriman's story was told in the 13th episode of the 6th season of the American Greed docuseries, which covers stories of white-collar crimes, Ponzi schemes, and corporate fraud in the USA. Hearing the voice of actor Stacy Keach, the episode tells the story of Merriman, interspersed with interviews of the investigators and some victims, news clips from the time, and dramatized reenactments of the incidents that make up the case.

The narration highlights his public image as a professional: he promised high and steady returns. Soon, however, the episode shows how the investors money were actually used by Merriman .

In the final segment, Keach recounts how the fraud ultimately collapsed. The episode notes that Shawn Merriman later pleads guilty.

== Similar cases ==
Merriman’s case is cited in discussions of financial ethics and fiduciary responsibility. It has been compared to other cases involving misuse of client trust and fraudulent concealment of financial information, such as lawsuits against Global E-trading LLC and the company Chargebacks911.

== See also ==
- Economy of Utah
- Financial fraud
- White-collar crime
- Ponzi scheme
- List of Ponzi schemes
- Bernie Madoff
- American Greed
