= Charis Galanakis =

Greek scientist

Charis M. Galanakis Χάρης Γαλανάκης
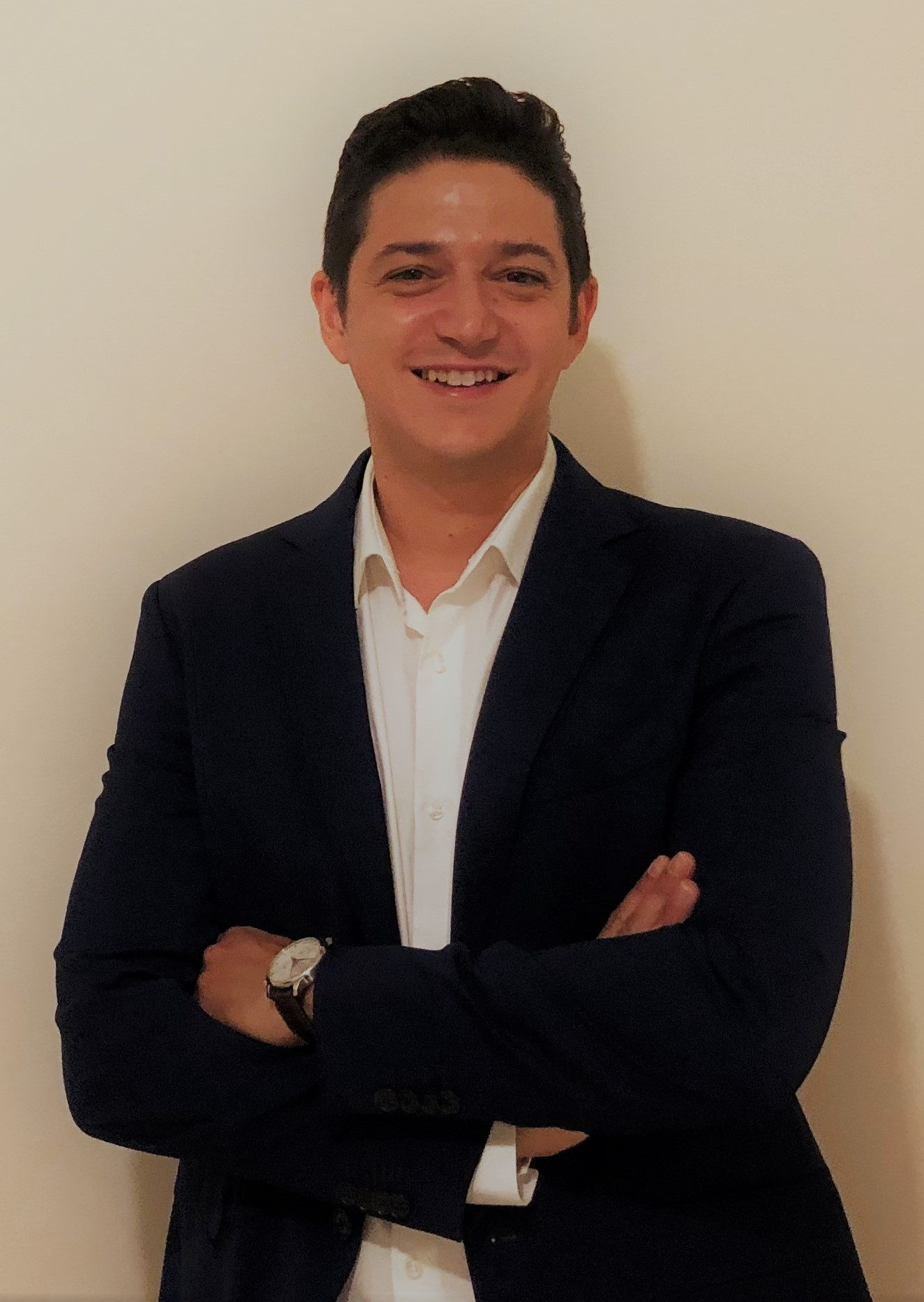
- Born: April 3, 1981 (age 44); Chania, Greece
- Education: Technical University of Crete; University of Ioannina; Ulster University; Patras University
- Occupations: Author; educator; journal editor; and food, agricultural and environmental scientist

Charis M. Galanakis (Greek:Χάρης Γαλανάκης) is a Greek researcher, and food, agricultural and environmental scientist.

== Early life and education ==
Galanakis was born on April 3, 1981, in Chania, Greece, to a family of chemists. He earned his degree in chemistry in 2002 and his certificate for Oenology in 2004, both at the Patras University. He also finished his master's degree in Food Technology in 2004 from Patras University-University of Ioannina-Ulster University. In 2010, he finished his doctoral degree at the Technical University of Crete.

== Career ==
Galanakis started as a Chemist-Oenologist in 2004 in a family-owned business—a laboratory in Chania, Greece. In 2009, Galanakis, along with Eva Tornberg, founded Phenoliv AB which developed a patented process of extracting polyphenol antioxidants from waste water used in olive oil while purifying the same waste water in the same extraction process. The patent, however, was later abandoned for unknown reasons. In the same year, his first research publication—which highlighted the innovation for the use of dietary fiber suspensions from olive mill wastewater as potential fat replacements in meat products—attracted public interest.

As an agricultural, environmental and food scientist, Galanakis' work is mainly focused on innovation and sustainability in the food industry, particularly more in the activity of "food waste recovery." The same research aims to high added-value compounds from wasted by-products in different stages of food production, re-utilize them in the food chain, and make bigger impact in achieving the Sustainable Development Goals (SDGs)—such as SDGs 2, 3, 6, 12, 13 and 15. This concept of "food waste recovery" was greatly highlighted in the advent of the COVID-19 pandemic which had greatly affected—among others—various global food production chains, food safety, food security, and environmental impacts caused by unsustainable food production around the world.

As an educator, he was a professor in King Saud University; currently, he is now an honorary professor at Taif University in Saudi Arabia and a distinguished visiting professor at the University of Johannesburg in South Africa while also serving as a research and innovation director at Galanakis Laboratories in Greece. Aside from being an educator and a multidisciplinary scientist, he had also authored numerous books in his fields of expertise; he is also the founder and the director of Food Waste Recovery Group (SIG5) of ISEKI Food Association in Vienna, Austria; and the editor-in-chief of Discover Food and Discover Environment journals.

== Recognitions ==
In 2019, 2021–2023, Galanakis was recognized as a "Highly Cited Researcher in the field of Agricultural Sciences" by Clarivate's Web of Science. From 2019 until 2023, he has also been consistently named and included in the list of the "World's Top 2% Scientists" by Stanford University.

== Selected publications ==
- Galanakis, Charis M. (August 1, 2012). "Recovery of high added-value components from food wastes: Conventional, emerging technologies and commercialized applications". Trends in Food Science & Technology. 26 (2): 68–87. doi:10.1016/j.tifs.2012.03.003. ISSN 0924-2244 – via Elsevier.
- Galanakis, Charis M. (April 2020). "The Food Systems in the Era of the Coronavirus (COVID-19) Pandemic Crisis". Foods. 9 (4): 523. doi:10.3390/foods9040523. ISSN 2304-8158. PMC 7230343. PMID 32331259.
- Galanakis, Charis M.; Rizou, Myrto; Aldawoud, Turki M. S.; Ucak, Ilknur; Rowan, Neil J. (April 1, 2020). "Innovations and technology disruptions in the food sector within the COVID-19 pandemic and post-lockdown era". Trends in Food Science & Technology. 110: 193–200. doi:10.1016/j.tifs.2021.02.002. ISSN 0924-2244. PMC 9759022. PMID 36567851. S2CID 233572196.
- Galanakis, Charis M. (October 1, 2013). "Emerging technologies for the production of nutraceuticals from agricultural by-products: A viewpoint of opportunities and challenges". Food and Bioproducts Processing. 91 (4): 575–579. doi:10.1016/j.fbp.2013.01.004. ISSN 0960-3085 – via Elsevier.
- Roselló-Soto, Elena; Galanakis, Charis M.; Brnčić, Mladen; Orlien, Vibeke; Trujillo, Francisco J.; Mawson, Raymond; Knoerzer, Kai; Tiwari, Brijesh K.; Barba, Francisco J. (April 1, 2015). "Clean recovery of antioxidant compounds from plant foods, by-products and algae assisted by ultrasounds processing. Modeling approaches to optimize processing conditions". Trends in Food Science & Technology. 42 (2): 134–149. doi:10.1016/j.tifs.2015.01.002. ISSN 0924-2244 – via Elsevier.
- Galanakis, Charis M. (March 1, 2015). "Separation of functional macromolecules and micromolecules: From ultrafiltration to the border of nanofiltration". Trends in Food Science & Technology. 42 (1): 44–63. doi:10.1016/j.tifs.2014.11.005. ISSN 0924-2244 – via Elsevier.
- Zannou, Oscar; Pashazadeh, Hojjat; Ibrahim, Salam A.; Koca, Ilkay; Galanakis, Charis M. (May 1, 2022). "Green and highly extraction of phenolic compounds and antioxidant capacity from kinkeliba (Combretum micranthum G. Don) by natural deep eutectic solvents (NADESs) using maceration, ultrasound-assisted extraction and homogenate-assisted extraction". Arabian Journal of Chemistry. 15 (5) 103752. doi:10.1016/j.arabjc.2022.103752. ISSN 1878-5352. S2CID 246602268.
