= Illinois Baptist State Association =

The Illinois Baptist State Association (IBSA) is the state convention of Southern Baptists in the U.S. state of Illinois.

== History ==
The first preliminary meeting to discuss organizing a convention of Baptist churches in the state was held in 1906. The first official Annual Meeting was held the next year and Benjamin Franklin Rodman was named the first executive director. The Illinois Baptist State Association was formally incorporated on November 2, 1907, at Marion, Illinois. The association affiliated with the Southern Baptist Convention in 1910.

The headquarters of the group moved to Du Quoin, in 1923, then to Carbondale, in 1930 before finally relocating to Springfield, Illinois in 1971.

The Illinois Baptist State Association is an association of messengers from Illinois Southern Baptist churches cooperating to achieve common goals. The purpose of IBSA is to assist in establishing and developing effective churches in their context.
