= Utah–Idaho Southern Baptist Convention =

Group of 170 Baptist-affiliated churches in Utah and Idaho

The Utah–Idaho Southern Baptist Convention is a group of churches affiliated with the Southern Baptist Convention located in the U.S. states of Utah and Idaho.

The convention is headquartered in Draper, Utah and is made up of 10 Baptist associations. It had 170 churches as of 2020.

== Doctrinal beliefs ==
The Utah–Idaho Southern Baptist Convention believes that the Bible is the verbally inspired Word of God and is sufficient as the only infallible rule of faith and practice. The convention is also supportive of The Baptist Faith and Message 2000 which was adopted by the Southern Baptist Convention.

== Cooperative program ==
The Utah–Idaho Southern Baptist Convention participates in the Cooperative Program (CP). CP is described as a tool used by God to empower the witness of Baptists in Utah and Idaho. Every Southern Baptist Church in the state is challenged to give 10% of all tithes and offerings to the Cooperative Program. These funds are then pooled with other church gifts from Utah and Idaho. State convention staff collect the funds and distribute some for missions work in Utah and Idaho while the rest is forwarded on to the Southern Baptist Convention (SBC). The SBC then uses gifts collected from all SBC state conventions to fund missions in the United States as well as send missionaries around the world. The Cooperative Program provides the opportunity for even the smallest church to be a part of fulfilling the Great Commission.
