= State Convention of Baptists in Indiana =

The State Convention of Baptists in Indiana (SCBI) is a group of churches affiliated with the Southern Baptist Convention located in the U.S. state of Indiana. Headquartered in Martinsville, it is made up of about 400 churches and 14 Baptist associations.

== Beliefs ==
The State Convention of Baptists in Indiana believes that the Bible is the verbally inspired Word of God and is sufficient as the only infallible rule of faith and practice. SCBI is also supportive of The Baptist Faith and Message 2000 which was adopted by the Southern Baptist Convention.

== Cooperative Program ==
The State Convention of Baptists in Indiana participates in the Cooperative Program (CP). CP is described as a tool used by God to empower the witness of Baptists in Indiana. Every Southern Baptist Church in Indiana is challenged to give 10% of all her tithes and offerings to the Cooperative Program. These funds are then pooled with other church gifts from Indiana. State convention staff collect the funds and distribute some for missions work in Indiana while the rest is forwarded on to the Southern Baptist Convention (SBC). The SBC then uses gifts collected from all SBC state conventions to fund missions in the United States as well as send missionaries around the world. The Cooperative Program provides the opportunity for even the smallest church to be a part of fulfilling the commission.

== Affiliated organizations ==
- Highland Lakes Baptist Camp a camp and retreat center located southwest of Indianapolis
- Indiana Baptist Magazine the news reporting agency for the convention
- Indiana Baptist Foundation the foundation offers investment management services to the State Convention of Baptist in Indiana, associations, and member churches
