= Wyoming Southern Baptist Mission Network =

The Wyoming Southern Baptist Mission Network is a group of churches affiliated with the Southern Baptist Convention located in the U.S. state of Wyoming.

The convention is headquartered in Casper, Wyoming. it is made up of about 100 churches and three Baptist Regions.

== Regions ==
- Northeast
- South
- West

== Affiliated organizations ==
- Mountain Top Baptist Assembly: an encampment center owned and operated by Wyoming Southern Baptist Mission Network.
