= Hawaii Pacific Baptist Convention =

Group of American churches

The Hawaii Pacific Baptist Convention (HPBC) is a group of churches affiliated with the Southern Baptist Convention located in the U.S. state of Hawaii and other pacific regions. Headquartered in Honolulu, it is made up of 138 churches on 11 islands in 6 Baptist associations.

== History ==
Baptist work had its beginning in 1926 when Charles J. McDonald, a layman, started work in the town of Wahiawa with a Sunday School which eventually became the First Baptist Church of Wahiawa.

A few Southern Baptist missionaries stopped in Hawaii for short periods of time between 1937 and 1938 but it was not until 1940, when all of the missionaries in China and Japan were forced out of these countries, that the International Mission Board (then known as the Foreign Mission Board) began thinking about opening work in these islands. As these first Baptist missionaries came and surveyed the islands, they concluded 6 percent of the people were nominally Christian.

On December 12, 1940, the Hawaiian Mission of the Foreign Mission Board was formally organized and Wahiawa church was the first church to affiliate. In 1941, the Olivet Baptist Church was constituted in Honolulu out of the work which was started by layman, Joseph Tyssowski. Southern Baptist missionary, Victor Koon, was called as the pastor of Olivet.

Twenty-four representatives (called messengers) from 5 churches (Wahiawa, Olivet, Nuuanu, Calvary and Waimea) met at the Baptist Bible School of Hawaii on July 12, 1943, and organized the Association of Baptist Churches of Hawaii.

The work spread to the other islands. A group of Christians meeting as the Missionary Bible Church in Waimea, Kauai, asked for help, and the Waimea Baptist Church was organized on this foundation in 1943. A Baptist chaplain stationed on Maui began a mission which later became the Kahului Baptist Church. A public school teacher, who was converted at the Olivet Baptist Church, began a Sunday School on the island of Molokai at an unused Buddhist temple. This group became the Kaunakakai Baptist Church. Dr. and Mrs. Charles Leonard felt led to go to Hilo, Hawaii, to open work there and were influential in starting the Kinoole Baptist Church.

Churches were established on each of the main islands of Hawaii. Meeting in school buildings, groups of people studied the Bible, were converted and eventually constituted churches throughout six of the islands. With the help of the Lottie Moon Christmas Offering, sanctuaries soon replaced these temporary meeting places. At the annual meeting of the Association of Baptist Churches of Hawaii, July 21 at Calvary Baptist Church, the organization's name was changed to Hawaii Baptist Convention.

The Baptist Student Union formed in Manoa. The Baptist Bible School of Hawaii opened staffed by missionaries appointed by the Foreign Mission Board. The first issue of the Hawaii Baptist; was produced with Joe W. Bailey as volunteer editor. Two acres of land on Heulu Street at Liholiho was purchased for a Baptist secondary School. The Hawaii Baptist Academy opened its doors to its first students in 1949. Over 1,100 students are enrolled today from kindergarten through 12th grade. Two campuses are located in Nuuanu Valley on Oahu.

A 16-acre campsite on the leeward coast of Oahu, the former home of the Waianae sugarcane plantation manager, was purchased. It was named Puu Kahea Baptist Assembly, "Echoing Hills"; in Hawaiian. With the coming of statehood to Hawaii, Foreign Mission Board support began to diminish in 1951 and the churches were challenged as never before to reach more adults, to increase in stewardship, to grow in total dedication to the cause of Christ, and to continue in their missionary outreach. The North American Mission Board (reorganized from the Home Mission Board in 1997) and other agencies, have continued to help Hawaii Pacific Baptists' missions and ministry opportunities.

In 1955 the first meeting of the HBC executive board met at the Baptist Student Center. The Samoa Baptist Academy began with 14 volunteer teachers.

In 1979 Wayland Baptist College opened in Hawaii as their first campus outside of Texas. In 1981 the college changed its name to Wayland Baptist University.

In 1997 the name changed to the Hawaii Pacific Baptist Convention to represent the territories of the convention.

== Beliefs ==
The Hawaii Pacific Baptist Convention currently affirms the Baptist Faith and Message of 1963 that is no longer adopted by the Southern Baptist Convention.

During the 2010 state convention, a recommendation was presented to the messengers to amend the Hawaii Pacific Baptist Convention's Constitution, Article III, Statement of Faith. The change would read, "The Convention shall be founded on a fellowship based on the Holy Bible, Old and New Testaments. Specific doctrinal distinctives are identified in any historic or current Baptist Faith and Message adopted by the Southern Baptist Convention. As of the current Amended Date, any future revision of the Baptist Faith and Message must be reviewed and affirmed by the Hawaii Pacific Baptist Convention for adoption." The recommended amendment went to a vote in 2011.

== Presidents ==
- Dr. Victor Koon (1946-19??)
- Dr. Chester R. Young Sr. (1952–1954)
- Pastor Ernest Mosley (1966–1967)
- Dan Liu (1967–1968)
- Mori Hiratani (1968–1970)
- Dr. Daniel Hen Chong Kong (early 1970s)
- Dr. W.C. Garland (1984–1986)
- Cliff Hoff (1986–1988)
- Donna Farr (1988–1990)
- Pastor Kenneth Newman (1990–1992)
- Paul Oyer (1992–1994)
- Paul Kaneshiro (1994–1996)
- George Moyer (1996–1998)
- Pastor Steve Murphy (1998–2000)
- George Iwahiro (2000–2002)
- Pastor Dan Van Alstine (2002–2004)
- Ken Sakai (2004–2006)
- Pastor Duane McDaniel (2006–2007)
- Pastor Robert Miller (2007–2009)
- Walt Agena (2009–2011)
- Pastor Steve Irvin (2011–2013)
- Pastor Alberto Camacho (2013–2015)
- Pastor John Endriss (2015–2017)
- Wes Higuchi (2017-2018)
- Pastor Steve Irwin (2018-2021)
- Pastor Shane Okimoto (2021-2022)
- Pastor John Endriss (2022-2023)
- Pastor Brian Frable (2023-2025)
- Pastor Shane Tanigawa (current)

== Associations ==
HPBC affiliate churches are organized in six associations.

=== Big Island Baptist Association ===
Churches affiliated with the BIBA include:

- Cornerstone Christian Fellowship
- Cornerstone Christian Fellowship North Kona
- Cornerstone Christian Fellowship South Kona
- Faith Baptist Mission
- First Baptist Church of Waimea
- Hamakua Baptist Church
- Hilo Baptist Church
- Hilo Korean Christian Church
- Kaumana Drive Baptist Church
- Kinoole Baptist Church
- Kohala Baptist Church
- Kona Baptist Church
- Ocean View Filipino
- Ocean View Baptist Mission
- Pahala Baptist Bible Mission
- Paradise Park Church
- Puna Baptist Church
- Puuanahulu Baptist Church
- Sonshine Baptist Mission
- Waiakea Uka Bible Church
- Waikoloa Baptist Church

=== Garden Island Baptist Association ===
- Lihue Baptist Church
- Waimea Baptist Church

=== Guam Baptist Association ===
- Calvary Baptist Church, Tamuning, Guam
- Chuukese Christian Fellowship
- Guam First Baptist Church, Tamuning, Guam
- Marianas Baptist Church, Agat, Guam
- Saipan Good Baptist Church (located on Saipan, Commonwealth of the Northern Mariana Islands
- Tamuning Christian Fellowship, Tamuning, Guam
- Yigo Mission

=== Maui County Baptist Association ===
- Kaanapali Beach Ministries
- Kahului Baptist Church
- Kaunakakai Baptist Church
- Kihei Baptist Chapel
- Lahaina Baptist Church
- Lanai Baptist Church
- Maui First Korean Baptist Church
- Maui Philippine Baptist Church
- Pukalani Baptist Church
- Valley Isle Fellowship

=== Oahu Baptist Network ===
- Abundant Life Christian Fellowship
- Agape Mission Baptist Church
- Aina Haina Baptist Church
- All Nations Fellowship
- All People Mission Church
- Antioch Baptist Church of Hawaii
- Bethel Korean Baptist Church
- Central Baptist Church
- Chinese Baptist Church
- Cornerstone Fellowship
- Cornerstone Korean Baptist Church
- Dong Tam Baptist Church
- Enchanted Lake Baptist Church
- Ewa Beach Baptist Church
- Faith Baptist Church
- Fellowship Baptist Church
- Filipino International Baptist Church
- First Baptist Church Haleiwa
- First Baptist Church of Nanakuli
- First Baptist Church of Pearl City
- First Baptist Church of Wahiawa
- First Baptist Church of Waimanalo
- First Southern Baptist Church of Pearl Harbor
- Halawa Heights Baptist Church
- Haleiwa Filipino Mission
- Hawaii Bhansok Baptist Church
- Hawaii Chinese Baptist Church
- Hawaii Christian Baptist Church
- Hawaii Hope Mission Baptist Church
- Hawaii Kai Church
- Honolulu Russian Baptist Church
- Iglesia Amistad
- International Baptist Fellowship
- Kahaluu Baptist Church
- Kailua Baptist Church
- Kailua First Korean Baptist Church
- Kalihi Baptist Church
- Khemaras Center
- Korean Baptist Church of Pearl Harbor
- Korean Baptist Church of Waikiki
- Makaha Valley Chapel
- Makakilo Baptist Church
- Mililani Baptist Church
- Mililani Fil-Am Baptist Church
- Mililani Korean Baptist Church
- Mt. Kaala Baptist Church
- Mountain View Community Church
- New Community Baptist Church
- New Covenant Baptist Church
- New Life Christian Church
- North Windward Baptist Chapel
- Nuuanu Baptist Church
- Nuuanu Chuukese Congregation
- Ohana Mission Baptist Church
- OlaNui!
- Olive Baptist Church
- Olivet Baptist Church
- Pali View Baptist Church
- Palisades Baptist Church
- Pawaa Community Church
- The Gathering
- University Avenue Baptist Church
- Village Park Baptist Church
- Waialae Baptist Church
- Waianae Baptist Church
- Waikiki Baptist Church
- Waipahu Community Christian
- Waipio Community Baptist Church
- West Oahu Community Church

=== South Pacific Baptist Association ===
- Emmanuel Baptist Church
- Fagalii Baptist Church
- Falemuaga Baptist Church
- Faleniu Baptist Church
- First Chinese Baptist Church of American Samoa
- Happy Valley Baptist Church
- Pago Pago Baptist Church
- Samoa Korean Baptist Church
- Seafarers' Christian Fellowship
- Tafuna Baptist Church

=== Asia Baptist Network ===
- Koza Baptist Church (Okinawa, Japan)
- Freedom Village Church (S. Korea)
- Songtan Central Baptist Church (S. Korea)
- Tokyo Baptist Church (Japan)
- Yokohama International Baptist Church (Japan)

== Affiliated Organizations ==
- Hawaii Baptist Academy: A Christ-centered K-12 education ministry to children
- Puu Kahea Conference Center: the conference center offers retreat and educational opportunities for churches and other organizations
- Wayland Baptist University, Hawaii Campus (Kapolei).
