= Baptist Convention of Maryland/Delaware =

The Baptist Convention of Maryland/Delaware (BCMD) is a group of churches affiliated with the Southern Baptist Convention located in the U.S. states of Maryland and Delaware. Headquartered in Crownsville, Maryland, it is made up of about 510 churches and 11 Baptist associations.

== Associations ==
- Arundel Baptist Association
- Baltimore Baptist Association
- Blue Ridge Baptist Association
- Delaware Baptist Association
- Eastern Baptist Association
- Mid-Maryland Baptist Association
- Montgomery Baptist Association
- Potomac Baptist Association
- Prince George’s Baptist Association
- Susquehanna Baptist Association
- Western Baptist Association

== Affiliated organizations ==
- Baptist Family and Children's Services of Maryland: an organization that ministers to children in need
- Baptist Foundation of Maryland/Delaware: the foundation offers investment management services to the Baptist Convention of Maryland/Delaware, associations, and member churches
