= StormPay =

StormPay of TN was an electronic money auction payment processor run by Stormpay Incorporated, a Clarksville, Tennessee, United States company founded in October 2002. It allowed anyone with an e-mail address to buy or sell StormPay Auction items after opening an online account.

For a prolonged period spanning February 8 to 10, 2006, the StormPay website was again unavailable due to a DDOS attack. Being a registered company, records were filed with the Tennessee Department of State and open to public viewing.

StormPay was not a member of the Better Business Bureau, although it generated more complaints to BBB than any other Middle Tennessee or Southern Kentucky business.
