= Super Summer =

Super Summer is a youth evangelism and leadership camp associated with the Baptist General Convention of Texas for youth graduating from 7th grade to 12th grade.

The camp is usually held on a Christian college/university campus of the campers' states. There are Super Summner camps in Oklahoma, Texas, Louisiana, Georgia, Arkansas, Montana, Missouri, Kansas, Alabama, Illinois, Mississippi, Indiana, New York, Ohio, and Tennessee.

== History ==
Super Summer of Texas began in 1974 as a training course for Christian young people for personal religious growth and evangelism. Started by Dr. George Worrell, the camp begun as a cooperative effort by several Texas churches in Texas. Student groups met for school sessions in church buildings in the Dallas area. They were housed in the homes of volunteer church members, and bused to their school locations each day. The students studied until evening, then attended Rainbow Celebration. an evening worship service.

As Super Summer spread to other Southern Baptist State Conventions, other Southern Baptist Youth Evangelism leaders and speakers became involved. These included Phillip Hunter, Emory Gadd, Barry St. Clair, and Knox Talbert.

== Super Summer Texas ==
Super Summer now include the Evangelism Division of the Baptist General Convention of Texas. The students were moved to the Baylor University campus. Super Summer is now hosted by other Texas Baptist Universities

The students stay in dorms, participate in recreational activities. During a week at Super Summer, students spend approximately twenty-four hours in evangelism and discipleship training sessions taught by youth leaders and pastors.

== Super Summer Oklahoma ==
Super Summer Oklahoma is one of the smaller super summer camps. Led by Evan Dare, the camp has an executive staff pastors and youth pastors from Oklahoma. The camp is hosted at Oklahoma Baptist University (OBU) and consists of three weeks, usually the first three weeks in June, known as Weeks One, Two, and Three.

Super Summer Oklahoma is divided by grade based on color schools. Red means the student is going into 8th grade, Blue - 9th, Orange - 10th, Yellow - 11th, Green - 12th, and Silver - Post grad. The camp has a Purple school for students intending to enter Christian ministry. Students can attend Purple school after finishing Yellow school.

The average cost of Super Summer camp to students varies; the students' home churches usually assist with the tuition.

== Super Summer Missouri ==
In the early 1980s, the Missouri Baptist Convention started hosting Super Summer camps. The Missouri Super Summer sessions have been held at Southwest Baptist University, William Jewell College and Hannibal–LaGrange University.

For many summers, Super Summer Missouri culminated with a celebration at the Worlds of Fun Theme Park in Kansas City, Missouri that included contemporary Christian music artists and speakers In the 1990s the Convention replaced the celebration with a mission trip for students who received the proper training at the Super Summer camp.

== Super Summer New York ==
In 2012 Family Life, a parachurch ministry in Upstate New York, founded Super Summer New York. This has been a cooperative effort of Super Summer Oklahoma and the staff at Family Life. The New York Super Summer camp is held annually at Houghton College.
