= David W. Whitlock =

American academic

15th President of Oklahoma Baptist University
- In office November 1, 2008 – January 8, 2019
- Preceded by: John W. Parrish

David Wesley Whitlock is an American academic who served as the 15th president of Oklahoma Baptist University from November 1, 2008, to January 8, 2019.

== Background ==
A fifth-generation Oklahoman, Whitlock was born in Purcell and graduated from Wayne High School in Wayne, Oklahoma. He completed a bachelor's degree in chemistry from Southeastern Oklahoma State University in 1984, a master of business administration from Southeastern in 1985, and a doctorate in educational leadership and policy studies from the University of Oklahoma in 1995. Whitlock had served as associate provost at SBU since 2006, a position responsible for accreditation activities with the Higher Learning Commission of the North Central Association of Colleges and Schools. Whitlock aided in SBU's 10-year review process for continued accreditation during the 2005–06 school year. In 2007, Whitlock was appointed dean of SBU's adult and off-campus programs. From 2001 to 2006, he served as assistant to SBU President C. Pat Taylor for strategic planning. Whitlock has played an active role in international programs and missions endeavors, working with educational organizations in the United Arab Emirates, China and Russia. He has traveled extensively visiting, serving on mission teams, or leading educational tours in thirty countries. Active in a variety of professional organizations, Whitlock has served as a consultant-evaluator with the Higher Learning Commission of the North Central Association of Colleges and Schools since 2006. He also is an evaluator and mentor with the Association of Collegiate Business Schools and Programs.

== Employment history ==
Whitlock had been associate provost, dean of graduate studies, and dean of the college of business and computer science at Southwest Baptist University in Bolivar, Missouri. He joined the SBU administration in 1999, and also was a professor of business at the Missouri Baptist institution. Prior to his work at SBU, he taught for 14 years at Southeastern Oklahoma State University. He was appointed to the Southeastern faculty in 1985 as an instructor of business. He was promoted to assistant professor in 1991 and associate professor in 1996. He was named chair of the university's business information management program in 1995 and served in that role until moving to SBU. In addition to his academic work, Whitlock served as a bivocational co-pastor of Wellspring Baptist Fellowship in Bolivar, Missouri, from 1999 until his move to OBU in 2008. He was bivocational pastor of Silo Baptist Church in Silo, Oklahoma, from 1996 to 1999, and Hendrix Baptist Church in Hendrix, Oklahoma, from 1993 to 1994. He was licensed to preach by the First Baptist Church of Durant and ordained at Hendrix Baptist Church.

== Retirement ==
On January 8, 2019, Whitlock announced his retirement as OBU president. He served the rest of the academic year as chancellor.

== Author ==
Whitlock is the author of the book Opportunity: Introducing Free Enterprise and Business. He has been co-author or editor of three books related to business: A Noble Calling: Devotions and Essays for Business Professionals; Psalm 15: Integrating Life and Work; and Solomon Was a Businessman: Advice from the Wealthiest Man on Earth. He also has been a contributing writer for numerous other works.

== Education ==
B.S. Chemistry, Southeastern Oklahoma State University

MBA, Southeastern Oklahoma State University

Ph.D., University of Oklahoma
