= Brister =

Brister is a surname. Notable people with the surname include:

- Bubby Brister (born 1962), former American football quarterback
- Jen Brister (born 1975), stand-up comedian from South London
- Mark Brister, humanitarian, baptist pastor, and former university president
- Pat Brister (born 1946), business woman and Republican politician in St Tammany Parish, Louisiana
- Robert E. Brister, United States Navy officer during World War II
- Scott Brister (born 1954), former Justice of the Supreme Court of Texas
- T. C. Brister (1896–1976), former member of the Louisiana House of Representatives from Rapides Parish
- Wanda Brister (born 1957), American operatic mezzo-soprano and voice teacher
