= Darrin Patrick =

American author and pastor (1970–2020)

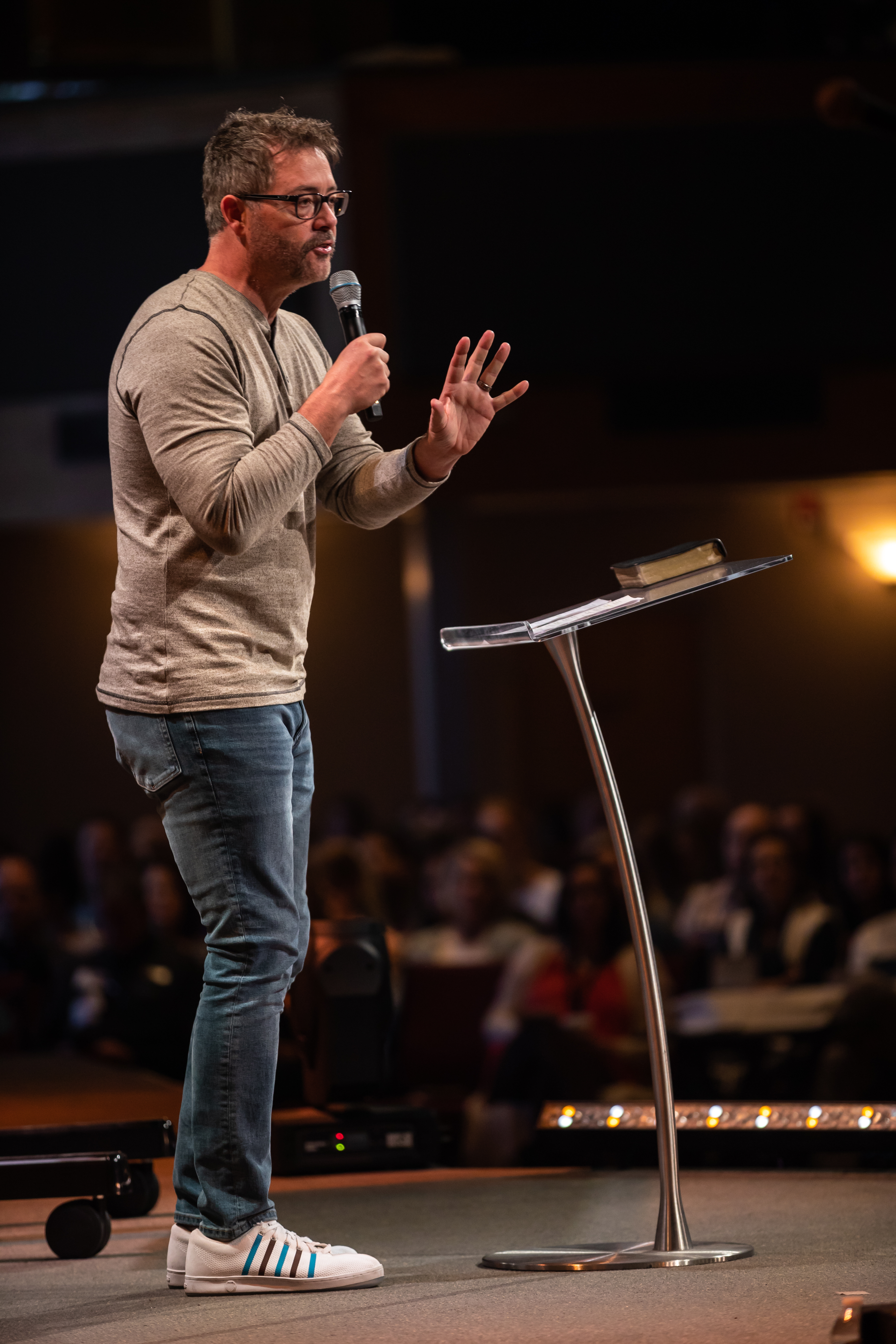
- Patrick in 2018
- Born: December 4, 1970; Marion, Illinois, U.S.
- Died: May 7, 2020 (aged 49); Pacific, Missouri, U.S.
- Education: Southwest Baptist University (BA); Midwestern Baptist Theological Seminary (MDiv); Covenant Theological Seminary (DMin)
- Occupations: Author; teaching pastor
- Years active: 2002–2020
- Children: 4

Darrin Patrick (December 4, 1970 – May 7, 2020) was an American author and teaching pastor at Seacoast Church in Charleston, South Carolina. He was a pastor of The Journey, a fellowship of churches in St. Louis, Missouri, which he founded in 2002. He served as the chaplain to the St. Louis Cardinals and was the author of several books. A prominent figure within New Calvinism, he was the vice-president of the Acts 29 Network, an international church planting organization, and a former council member of The Gospel Coalition.

He died by suicide in May 2020, in what appeared to be a “self-inflicted gunshot wound.”

== Early life and education ==
Patrick was born in Marion, Illinois. He became a Christian while in high school, where he was an all-conference, all-area catcher on the baseball team. After beginning a successful ministry whilst in Marion High School, he pursued pastoral training rather than a college baseball career.

He earned a Bachelor of Arts in Bible and Biblical Languages from Southwest Baptist University (1994), graduated summa cum laude from Midwestern Baptist Theological Seminary (M.Div., 1997), and received a Doctor of Ministry degree from Covenant Theological Seminary (2010).

== Career ==
Patrick moved from suburban Kansas City, Missouri, to St. Louis in 2002 to plant The Journey in the urban core. The church has seen unprecedented growth in the city of St. Louis and the broader metropolitan region. The Journey is now a multi-site ministry with six churches in Missouri and Illinois, including Patrick's hometown of Marion. The church has been scrutinized for its cultural engagement by the Missouri Baptist Convention and received national media attention regarding one of its outreach ministries, "Theology at the Bottleworks," for being held at Schlafly Bottleworks, a brewery in Maplewood, Missouri.

In his role as the chaplain to the St. Louis Cardinals, Patrick regularly led chapel services and Bible studies during the baseball season. He was present for the players either before or after home games. Shortly after the end of the 2013 season, Patrick officiated the wedding of Cardinals pitcher Shelby Miller. As a chaplain, Patrick was a part of Baseball Chapel, an international ministry recognized by Major and Minor League Baseball, which is responsible for the appointment and oversight of all team chapel leaders (over 500 throughout professional baseball).

Patrick was a vice-president of the Acts 29 Network, and was a council member of The Gospel Coalition, a group of Reformed Evangelical leaders from around the United States, including D. A. Carson, Tim Keller, and John Piper. He has written for Christianity Today and The Leadership Journal, and contributed to The Resurgence blog.

On April 13, 2016, it was announced that the Board of Elders of The Journey had removed Patrick from his position and required him to step down from all internal and external leadership positions. The reasons given were "pastoral misconduct" and a "historical pattern of sin". A letter from the elders made it clear that the misconduct did not involve adultery, but there was a violation of the "high standard for elders in marriage through inappropriate meetings, conversations, and phone calls with two women". In addition, the historical sins were listed and included lack of self-control, manipulation and lying, domineering, misuse of power, and refusal of personal accountability. The elders indicated that they had raised these issues with Patrick over a period of a few years, but he had repeatedly failed to address them. Patrick's name was removed from The Gospel Coalition's council and the board of directors of the Acts 29 Network. His disciplining was reported in the Christian press. In a conference in Las Vegas, in 2017, Patrick talked about the lessons he learned in losing his church.

After a restoration process led by Seacoast Church Founding Pastor Greg Surratt, Patrick joined the staff of Seacoast in June 2017 as a teaching pastor. He co-founded The Pastors Collective podcast with Greg Surratt in 2019. Patrick led Enneagram intensives as a coach through Crosspoint Ministries. He also worked with The Association of Related Churches (ARC), coaching pastors on building a healthy culture.

== Personal life and death ==
He married in 1993 and had four children.

Patrick died on May 7, 2020, in Pacific, Missouri, of a self-inflicted gunshot wound while target shooting. The death was later ruled to be by suicide.

== Books ==
- Patrick, Darrin (2010). Church Planter: The Man, the Message, the Mission. Crossway Books. ISBN 978-1-4335-1576-7.
- Patrick, Darrin; Carter, Matt (2011). For the City: Proclaiming and Living Out the Gospel. Zondervan. ISBN 978-0-310-33007-3.
- Patrick, Darrin (2014). The Dude's Guide to Manhood: Finding True Manliness in a World of Counterfeits. Thomas Nelson. ISBN 978-1-4002-0547-9.
- Patrick, Darrin; DeVine, Mark (2014). Replant: How a Dying Church Can Grow Again. David C. Cook. ISBN 978-0781410328.
- Patrick, Darrin; Patrick, Amie (2015). The Dude's Guide to Marriage: Ten Skills Every Husband Must Develop to Love His Wife Well. Thomas Nelson. ISBN 978-1-4002-0549-3.

=== Contributions ===
- DeYoung, Kevin (2011). Don't Call It a Comeback: The Old Faith for a New Day. Crossway Books. ISBN 978-1-4335-2169-0.
- ESV Bibles by Crossway (2013). ESV Gospel Transformation Bible. Crossway Books. ISBN 978-1433538674.
