= Southwest Baptist University =

Private university in Bolivar, Missouri, US

- Former name: Southwest Baptist College (1878–1981)
- Type: Private university
- Established: 1878; 148 years ago
- Religious affiliation: Missouri Baptist Convention; IABCU
- Academic affiliations: CCCU; CGE
- President: Jonathon Woodyard (interim)
- Provost: Tracy Manly
- Students: 2,168
- Location: Bolivar, Missouri, United States; 37°36′07″N 93°24′33″W
- Campus: 152 acres (61.5 ha)
- Colors: Purple and white
- Nickname: Bearcats
- Sporting affiliations: NCAA Division II –GLVC
- Website: sbuniv.edu

Southwest Baptist University (SBU) is a private university in Bolivar, Missouri, United States. It is affiliated with the Missouri Baptist Convention, which is part of the Southern Baptist Convention. In 2023, it had a total enrollment of 2,168 students.

== History ==
Abner S. Ingman and James R. Maupin founded Southwest Baptist College in 1878 in Lebanon, Missouri. The Lebanon campus originally had an enrollment of 60 students and six faculty. The college lasted one year before the city decided it no longer wanted it. When news got out that the college would be moving, the southwest Missouri communities of Aurora, Monett, and Bolivar attempted to attract the college. In 1879, the state of Missouri chartered the school and it moved to Bolivar. The college went through many financial difficulties in the early part of the twentieth century.

On June 1, 1910, at 11:00 am., the fire that would destroy the campus started. The fire broke out under suspect circumstances, leading some to believe arson was the cause. Bolivar citizen firefighters tried to put out the fire, but the water supply ran dry, and at 2:00 pm the fire engulfed the whole campus. Losses were estimated at $20,000. The college was rebuilt, and reopened in 1913.

Southwest Baptist University was granted an exception to Title IX in 2015, allowing it to legally discriminate against LGBT students for religious reasons.

In November 2021, the school's accreditor, the Higher Learning Commission, placed it on probation for being in noncompliance on criteria related to governance, academic freedom, and effective leadership. In November 2023, the Higher Learning Commission removed the university from probation.

=== Campus history ===
When it reopened in 1913 as a junior college, Southwest Baptist College consisted of four buildings, two of which still stand on the Stufflebaum campus: Casebolt Apartments (formerly Casebolt Science Building) and Memorial Hall.

On March 26, 1962, a fire destroyed Pike Auditorium. Students and townspeople saved eight pianos and almost all of the sports equipment from the locker rooms of the multipurpose building at that time. The auditorium was the only building destroyed by the fire. The fire became a turning point in the history of Southwest Baptist. The newly elected president, Robert E. Craig, used the event to stimulate the buying of 102 acres (41.3 ha) of farmland south of Bolivar. This expanded into the Shoffner Campus on which Southwest Baptist University resides today.

The Shoffner campus, located approximately a quarter-mile south of Stufflebaum campus, was first used in 1962 with the opening of Beasley Hall. Within ten years, Landen Hall (formerly New Men's Dorm), Leslie Hall, the Goodson Student Union, and the Wayne and Betty Gott Educational Center (formerly the campus library) were opened. In 1977, Mellers Dining Commons was opened, adjoining the Goodson Student Union.

In 1981, the Gene Taylor National Free Enterprise Center was opened to facilitate the College of Business and Computer Science. In the same year, Southwest Baptist College became Southwest Baptist University. In 1989, the Sells Administrative Building was completed to accommodate the growing administrative department.

In 1992, the Wheeler Science Center opened, giving the science department a facility capable of housing hundreds of students. The school of Physical Therapy was located in this building until it moved to a nearby, offsite location.

In 1995, SBU agreed with St. John's School of Nursing, a traditionally Catholic institution, to form St. John's School of Nursing of Southwest Baptist University located in Springfield, Missouri. It has since been renamed the Mercy College of Nursing and Health Sciences of Southwest Baptist University.

The Wayne and Betty Gott Educational Center was renovated in 1998 to accommodate classroom needs. The campus library moved to what is now the Jester Learning and Performance Center, and was renamed the Harriet K. Hutchens Library, which opened in 1996. The rest of the center was completed in 2001. It currently houses the Davis-Newport Theater, the Department of Language and Literature, the Department of Art, and the Bob R. Derryberry School of Communication Arts.

The most recent addition to the Shoffner campus is the Jane and Ken Meyer Wellness and Sports Center. It opened to students in January 2005. This facility houses an indoor track, intramural gym, fitness center, pool, café, racquetball courts, rock wall, and Hammons Court, the home of Bearcat basketball.

=== Presidents ===
Presidents, listed in chronological order:

1. James R. Maupin (1878–1884)
2. Abner S. Ingman (1884–1886)
3. Julius M. Leavitt (1886–1889)
4. W. H. Burnham (1889–1892)
5. Robert E. L. Burks (1892–1895)
6. Asa Bush (1895–1897)
7. James R. Rice (1897–1899)
8. Ernest W. Dow (1903–1905)
9. Joseph Rucker (1905–1908)
10. J. E. Austin (1908–1913)
11. Charles W. Fisher (1913–1915)
12. B. W. Wiseman (1915–1916)
13. John C. Pike (1916–1928)
14. John W. Jent (1928–1930)
15. Courts Redford (1930–1943)
16. Samuel H. Jones (1943–1948)
17. John W. Dowdy (1949–1960)
18. Robert E. Craig (1961–1967)
19. James L. Sells (1968–1979)
20. Harlan E. Spurgeon (1979–1983)
21. Charles L. Chaney (1983–1986)
22. J. Edwin Hewlett Jr. (1989–1990)
23. Wayne Gott (interim) (1991–1992)
24. Roy Blunt (1993–1996)
25. C. Pat Taylor (1996–2018)
26. Eric A. Turner (2018–2020)
27. Brad Johnson (interim) (2020-2021)
28. Richard J. Melson (2021–2026)
29. Jonathon Woodyard (interim) (2026-present)

== Academics ==
Southwest Baptist University Colleges include:

- Robert W. Plaster College of Business
- College of Professional Programs
- College of Health Professions
- Geneva Casebolt College of Arts & Sciences

== Buildings ==
- Casebolt Music Center and Casebolt Apartments – named after Geneva Casebolt, a benefactor who gave a large endowment for the buildings
- Davis Family Physical Therapy Center – houses the Doctor of Physical Therapy program
- Felix Goodson Student Union – named after a former dean of students
- Gene Taylor National Free Enterprise Center – named in honor of former Missouri Congressman Gene Taylor
- Hammons Center for Facilities Excellence – named after Dwain Hammons and his wife, Donna, who gifted SBU with the property where this building is located
- Harriett K. Hutchens Library – named in honor of Harriett K. Hutchens, who gave a generous donation
- Jane and Ken Meyer Wellness and Sports Center/Meyer Hall – named in honor of the Meyers, who were benefactors for this and other projects
- Jester Learning and Performance Center – named in honor of Bill Jester, who stepped in after the project had to be reorganized after the death of Sam Walton
- Jim Mellers Center – named in honor of a donor in the 1980s who owned a photography shop and later received a patent for a photography related idea
- Killian Health Center – named in honor of Bob and Betty Killian, owners of Killian Construction Company
- Mabee Chapel – named after the J.E. and L.E. Mabee Foundation
- Marietta Mellers Dining Commons – named in honor of the wife of Jim Mellers
- McClelland Dining Facility – capable of hosting banquets and conferences
- Plaster Athletic Center/Plaster Stadium/Plaster Hall – named in honor of benefactor Robert W. Plaster
- Randolph Meditation Chapel – open 24 hours a day
- Jim Sells Administrative Center – named in honor of Jim Sells, who served as president for 11 years (1968–1979) and as chancellor (1979-1992)
- Wayne and Betty Gott Educational Center/Gott Hall – named after two of the largest donors to SBU
- Wheeler Science Center – named in honor of Clarence Wheeler, who gave a large donation for the building and scholarships
- Beasley Hall – named in honor of Titus Beasley, who gave the lead gift for this hall
- Landen Hall – named in honor of Edward and Daisy Landen for "devotion to their church, the Southern Baptist Convention and to Christian higher education"
- Leslie Hall
- Memorial Hall – named in honor of the ten students from SBU who served in World War II
- Roseman Apartments – named in honor of the Roseman family, who previously owned the complex
- Woody Hall – named in honor of Jessie Lee Woody, a donor towards the project

== Athletics ==
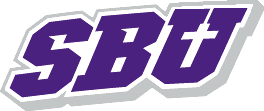
Logo for Bearcats athletics

Southwest Baptist University athletic teams compete in the NCAA Division II Great Lakes Valley Conference (GLVC). SBU competed in the Mid-America Intercollegiate Athletic Association (MIAA) until the spring of 2019, and planned to begin regular season competition for all sports in the GLVC beginning in the 2019–20 season. The university currently fields 18 NCAA Division II varsity sports. SBU was also one of the first schools to establish a varsity collegiate esports team, and is a charter member of the Collegiate Esports Association (CESPA). SBU added a cheer and STUNT team beginning in the 2018–19 season.

== Notable alumni ==
- Buddy Baker, film composer, best known for his long relationship and extensive work with the Walt Disney Company
- Roy Blunt, Republican senator for the State of Missouri (former president of university)
- Ben M. Bogard, founder of the American Baptist Association
- Jamie Gragg, Republican member of the Missouri House of Representatives
- Rod Jetton, former Speaker and Republican member of the Missouri House of Representatives
- Darrin Patrick, former pastor of The Journey church and former teaching pastor at Seacoast Church
- Shane Schoeller, Republican member of the Missouri House of Representatives and Republican candidate in the Missouri secretary of state election, 2012
