= John Wesley Raley =

Dr. John Wesley Raley (1903–1968) was an author, president of Oklahoma Baptist University for 27 years, a member of the Oklahoma Hall of Fame and of the Oklahoma Higher Education Hall of Fame.

Dr. Raley moved to Oklahoma in 1931, when he became pastor at First Baptist Church of Bartlesville. In 1932 Dr. Raley was elected as chairman of the board of trustees of Oklahoma Baptist University. In 1934 Dr. Raley was elected as president of the university, beginning the longest tenure of any OBU president. Dr. Raley received an honorary doctorate from OBU in 1935. In 1958 he was inducted into the Oklahoma Hall of Fame and later inducted into the Oklahoma Higher Education Hall of Fame.

In 1961 Dr. Raley resigned his position as president of Oklahoma Baptist University, citing reasons of health. He was elected chancellor, serving until his death in 1968.

== Major Accomplishments ==
Among the buildings constructed during Dr. Raley's presidency were:

- Brotherhood Dormitory-In 1999 it was renamed Agee Residence Center in honor of OBU's 13th President Bob R. Agee and his wife, Nelle.
- Mrs. W.S. Kerr Dormitory
- Thurmond Hall
- Clark Craig Fieldhouse-Building torn down on January 26, 2006. RAWC(Recreation and Wellness Center) currently occupies the location of former building
- President's Home
- Raley Chapel, OBU's signature building on the Shawnee campus

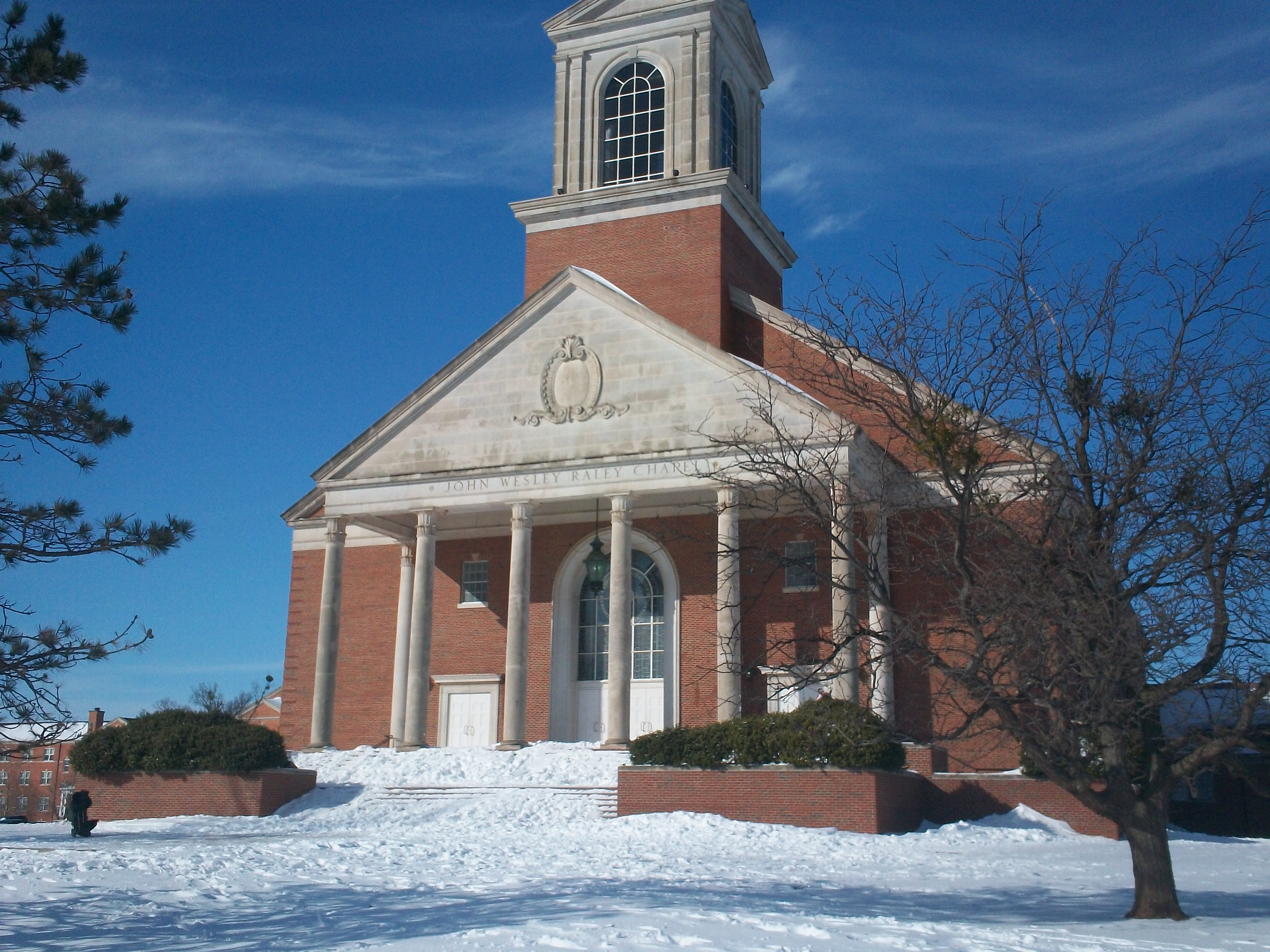
Raley Chapel in winter

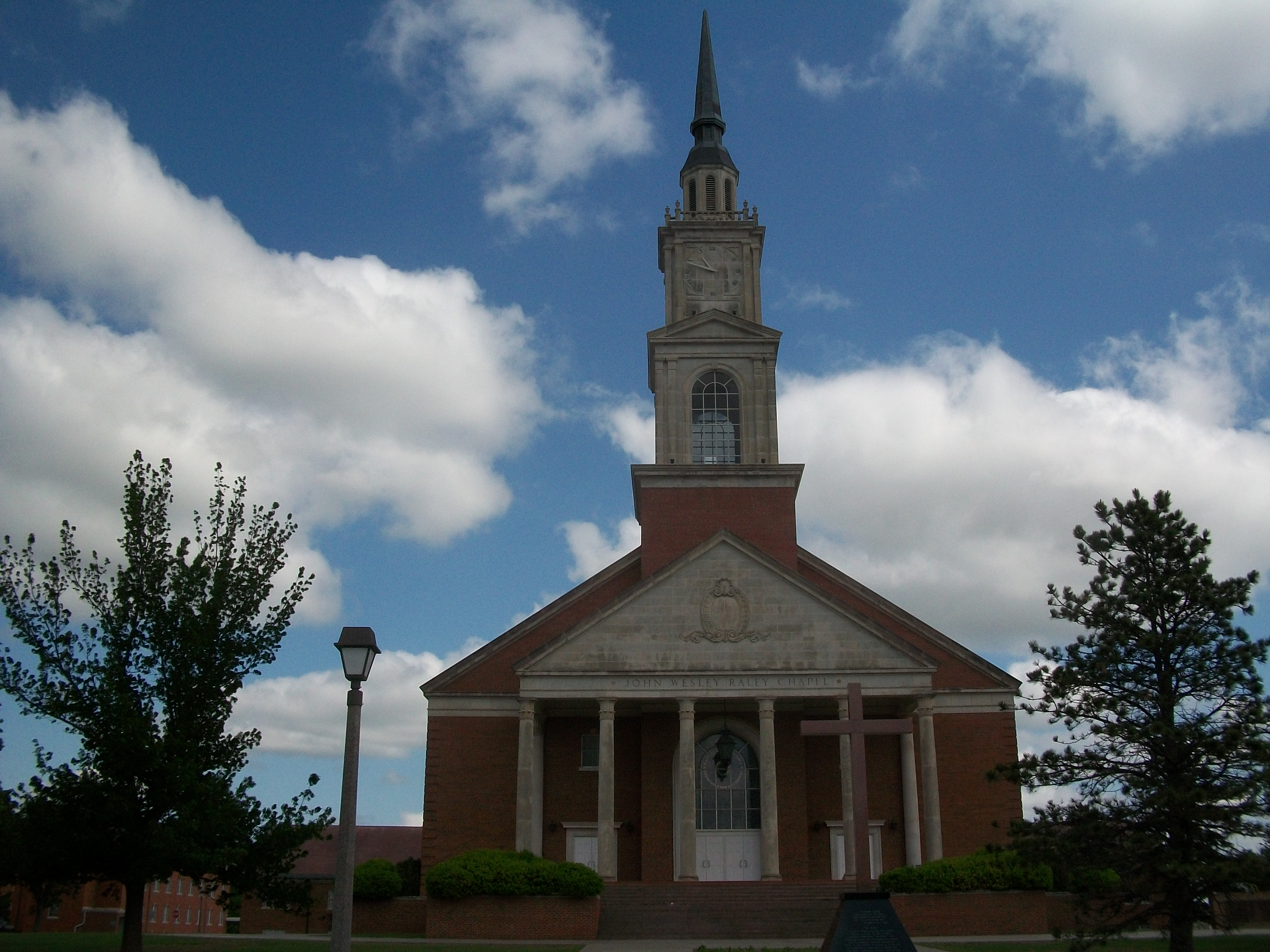
Raley Chapel in spring

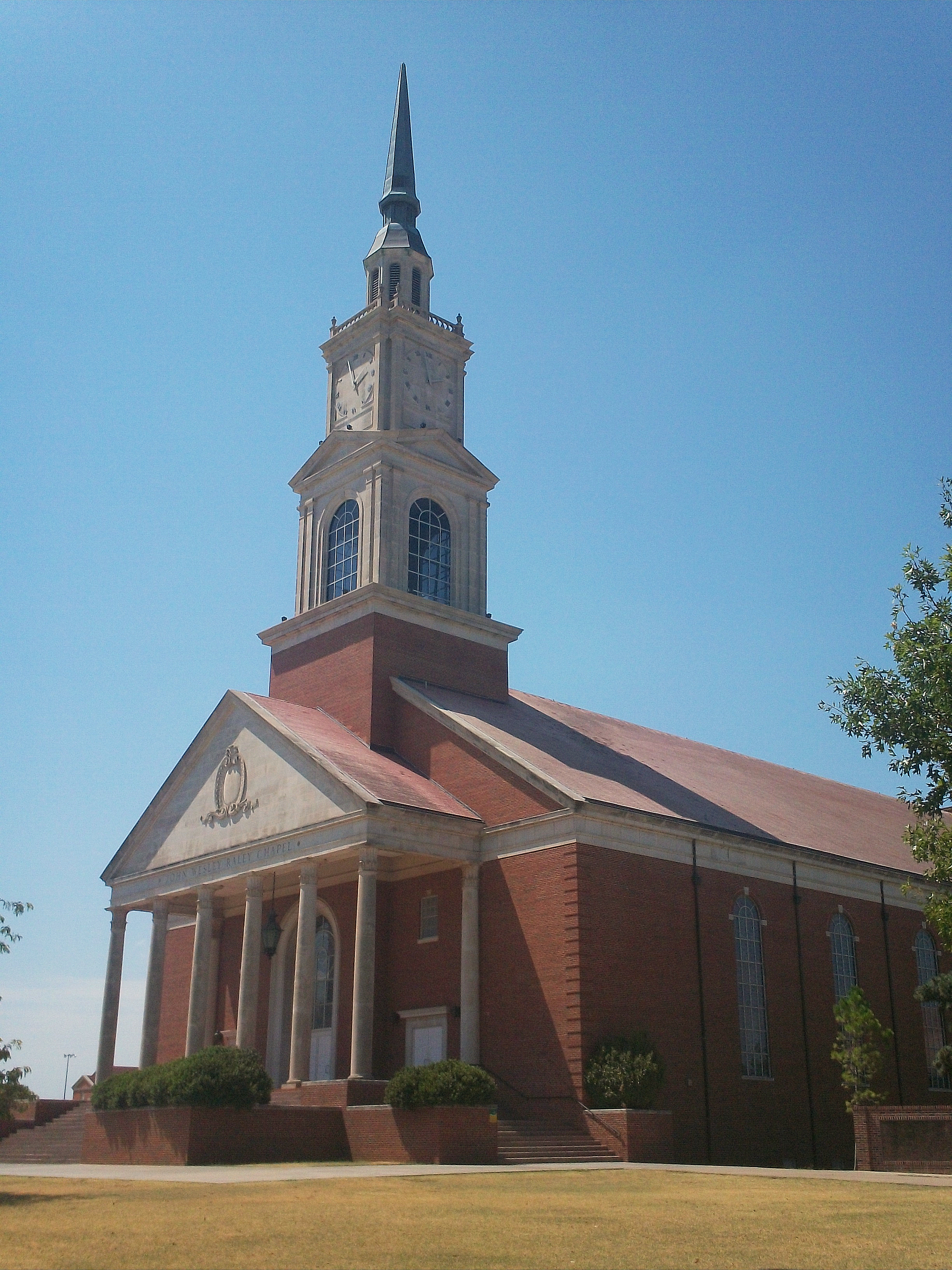
Raley Chapel in summer

== Family ==
Dr. Raley and his wife Helen Thames Raley had two children, John Wesley Raley Jr. and Helen Thames Raley Weathers. John Wesley Raley Jr. served in the U.S. Navy and later became the mayor of Ponca City, Oklahoma, then served several years as a judge. The Raleys had three grandchildren, John Wesley Raley III, Rob Raley, and Sandra Nash as well as five great-grandchildren: Chris, Laura, Kate, William and Wesley.
