= Bob Agee =

American academic administrator (1938–2026)

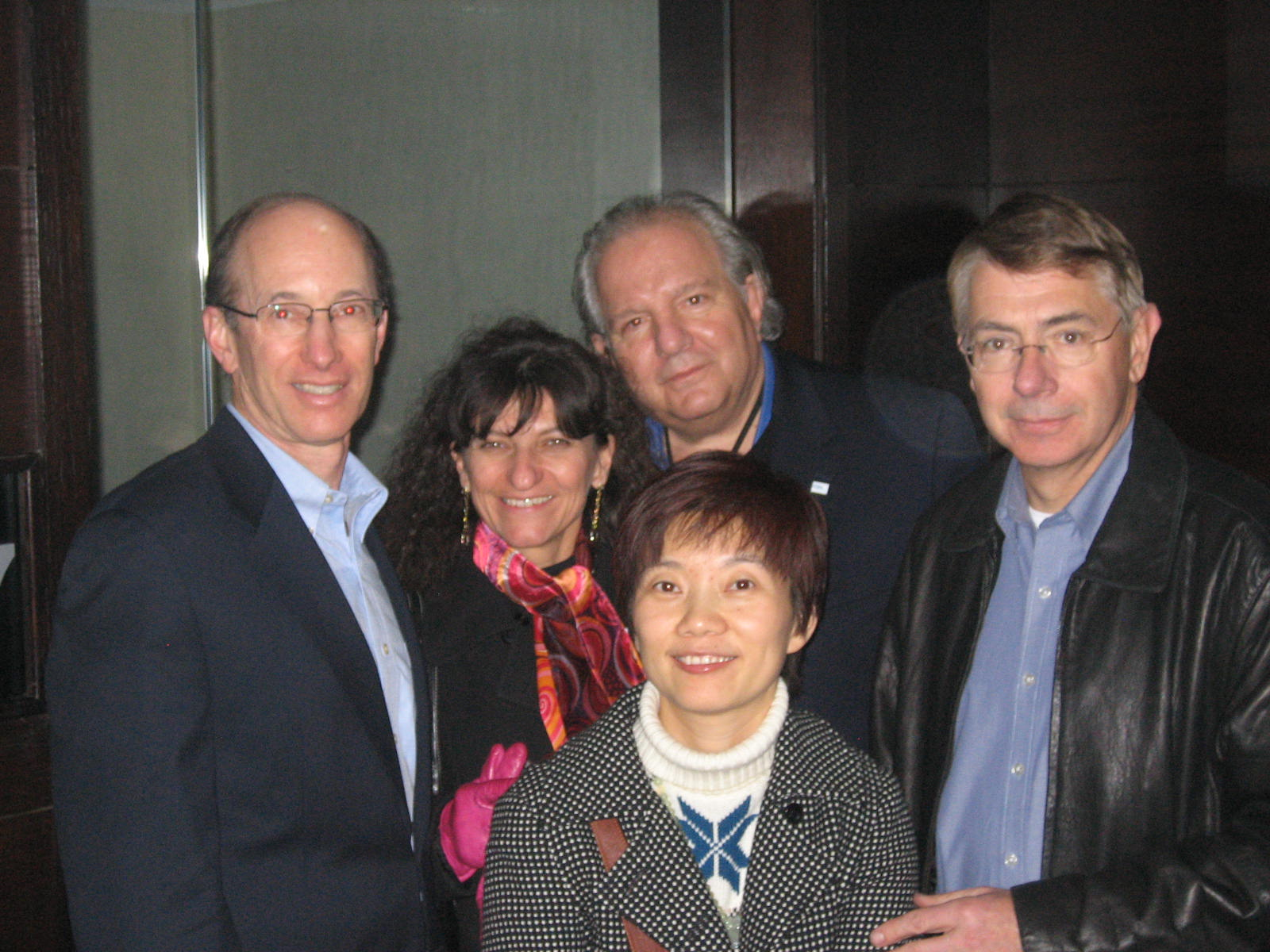
David Grossman, Judit Deilinger, Ted Samaras, Bob Agee, Lilly Luo (China Star principal)

Bob R. Agee (September 30, 1938 – September 26, 2026) was an American academic administrator who was the thirteenth President of Oklahoma Baptist University from 1982 to 1998. He also served as the Executive Director for the International Association of Baptist Colleges and Universities from 1997 to 2007.

== Life and career ==
Agee was born on September 30, 1938. He attended Union University in Jackson, Tennessee where he received his Bachelor of Arts degree. Agee went on to attend the Southern Baptist Theological Seminary in Louisville, Kentucky where he received Master of Divinity and Doctor of Ministry degrees. Agee also held a Ph.D. in Higher Education Administration from Vanderbilt University's George Peabody College for Teachers in Nashville, Tennessee and an Honorary Doctor of Divinity degree from California Baptist University.

He served as Vice President for Religious Affairs, professor of practical studies in the religion department, and as Special Assistant to the President for Institutional Planning at Union University in Jackson, Tennessee. He then served as the thirteenth President of Oklahoma Baptist University from 1982 to 1998. He was the Executive Director for the International Association of Baptist Colleges and Universities from 1997 to 2007.

Agee served on the Boards of Directors of the Council for Christian Colleges and Universities and the National Association of Independent Colleges and Universities. He was also involved with the commission on Policy Analysis for the National Association of Independent Colleges and Universities, the Education and Evangelism Committee of the Baptist World Alliance, the Accreditation Review Council for the North Central Association of Colleges and Secondary Schools, the National Council for the Accreditation of Teacher Education, the National Association of Independent Colleges and Universities, and the Education Commission of the Southern Baptist Convention. From 1998 to 2002, he served as Executive Director of the Consortium for Global Education.

Agee died in Jackson on September 26, 2026, at the age of 87.

== Bibliography ==
- Faithful Learning and the Christian Scholarly Vocation (co-editor)
