= Consortium for Global Education =

Private accredited universities in the United States

Consortium for Global Education (CGE) is an organization of private accredited universities in the United States and affiliated partner universities overseas, located in Atlanta, Georgia. Each member of the consortium is committed to a high value of quality academic education and supports the internationalization of higher education through student and faculty global participation. The CGE creates opportunities for faculty and students in key nations and provides opportunities for short term, semester, and summer study abroad programs.

== Overview ==
Eight founding member university presidents met in 1987 to investigate how administrators, faculty, and students could strategically make a global impact on international education through learning, service, and sharing professional expertise in higher education. Currently, the more than 40 consortium members represent approximately 72,050 undergraduate students and more than 7306 full-time faculty.

CGE supports global development in education with educators and students in nations that have a common vision for increasing student learning and a global worldview. CGE project participants combine research-based practices with an educator's passion for sharing skillful expertise overseas.

During these twenty-five years, CGE has helped place member institutions in a global network with key universities in at least 80 nations representing Africa, East Asia, Central Asia, Europe, Middle East, and Southeast Asia. Every year, CGE assists hundreds of faculty members and thousands of students to participate in CGE-related overseas study, service, and teaching programs that include:

- University and school partnerships
- Professional on-line training for faculty and teachers
- Workshops and lecture series
- Exchanges for faculty and students
- International conferences and forums
- Summer study programs
- Collaborative research

CGE member universities and colleges have become a gateway to the world for American educators and professionals who provide access to educational venues in countries desiring quality education, global stability, professional and economic development, and civil societies. As global issues force a measured and well-planned response for international participation, CGE is well positioned to foster integrative educational partnerships that are mutually beneficial.

Its board of directors includes the presidents of Dallas Baptist University, Carson-Newman College, Anderson University (South Carolina), Oklahoma Baptist University, Wayland Baptist University, Howard Payne University, Missouri Baptist University, North Greenville University, Campbellsville University, the provost of Union University, and the president of the International Association of Baptist Colleges and Universities.

== International partners ==
=== China ===
- Qingdao University
- Yanbian University of Science and Technology

=== Bhutan ===
- Ministry of Culture

=== Lithuania ===
- Lithuania Christian College
