= Jefferson R. Boulware =

American lawyer and politician

Jefferson R. Boulware (July 27, 1867 – April 8, 1913) was an American lawyer and politician.

Born in Putnam County, Illinois, Boulware moved with his family to Clark County, Missouri. He went to the Clark County public schools and then graduated from LaGrange College in Missouri (now Hannibal–LaGrange University). He went to a law school in St. Louis, Missouri, and was admitted to the Missouri bar.

Boulware taught school in Petersburg, Illinois. In 1896, Boulware moved to Peoria, Illinois, and continued to practice law. Boulware served in the Illinois House of Representatives from 1901 to 1905 and was a Democrat. Boulware died in a hospital in Springfield, Illinois, after suffering from a stroke while at a meeting of the Illinois Bar Association.
