= Courts Redford =

Samuel Courts Redford (September 4, 1898 – April 1977), was a Southern Baptist minister, professor, university president, and executive secretary-treasurer of the Southern Baptist Home Mission Board from 1954 to 1964 (now the North American Mission Board). Having surrendered to preach at the age of 12, he later graduated from Oklahoma Baptist University in Shawnee, OK. He pastored churches, later served on the faculty of his alma mater, then in 1930 assumed the presidency of Southwest Baptist University in Bolivar, Missouri.

== Family ==
Courts Redford married Helen Ruth Ford and together they had nine children: Virginia, Elizabeth, John, Rosemary, David, Sylvia, Bill, Courts Jr., Jeanette and Caroline.

== Education ==
Bachelor's Degree, (1920), Oklahoma Baptist University, Shawnee, OK

Master's Degree, (1927), Southwestern Baptist Theological Seminary, Ft. Worth, TX

Honorary Doctorate, Oklahoma Baptist University

Honorary Doctorate, William Carey College
