= Jami Smith =

American singer

Jami Smith is an American singer. She grew up in the small town of Chickasha, Oklahoma and is a graduate of Chickasha High School. She established Spring Rain Ministries, a non-profit ministry in 1999. Smith graduated from Oklahoma Baptist University in 1993 with a bachelor's degree in music education and has produced six independent albums prior to the 1999 release of her self-titled album, Jami, by Vertical. Smith has led music for Passion conferences, OneDay, the National Acteens Conference, and the Student Live Conference. Her songs are included on the Passion CD and the WOW Worship: Orange . The songs "Salt and Light" and "Wash Over Me" from her 2002 release, Wash Over Me, were chart toppers on Christian radio in the US.

== Personal life ==
She is married to Oklahoma attorney Justin King, with whom she has a girl named Emory and a boy named Griffin. She is the worship leader at Oakdale Baptist Church.

== Discography ==
- All This Is Christmas (2021)
- The Worship Project (2019)
- No Matter What (2016)
- Americana Hymns Vol. 1 (2013)
- Joyful, Joyful (2011)
- Verse (2010)
- Faith in You (2008)
- Hope of All the Earth (2005)
- Bravo God (2005)
- Wash Over Me (2003)
- Breathe Deep (2002)
- Home (2001)
- Jami Smith (2000)
- Mysterious Love (1998)
- Soul Thirst (1998)
- What I Know (1997)
- Come Unto Me (1996)
- In the Shadow (1994)
- Follow the Leader (1992)
