= John W. Parrish =

American journalist and university administrator (born 1939)

- Born: November 1, 1939 (age 86); Drumright, Oklahoma
- Known for: Journalism, Education, College Administrator

John W. Parrish (born November 1, 1939) served as the interim president of Oklahoma Baptist University (OBU), having been appointed on October 12, 2007 after Mark Brister’s resignation as OBU president. He began his presidency on November 11, 2007. In his opening address to students, he requested that they use the title "Mister P." when addressing him. This was later parodied by students who called him Master P.

== Early years ==
Parrish was born and raised in Drumright, Oklahoma, where he went through the tenth grade in high School. He then moved with his family to Eureka, Kansas and finished high school. He attended Oklahoma State University (OSU), where he earned a Bachelor of Science in General Business in 1961. He was a member of the Air Force Reserve in 1961-62, then returned to OSU and earned a Master's Degree in Journalism in 1964. He worked briefly for the Southside Times in Tulsa until a college friend told him that there was an opening for an assistant professor of Journalism at OBU.

== Career at OBU ==
Parrish joined the OBU administrative staff in 1964 and retired as Executive Vice President and Chief Financial Officer on November 20, 2002. Serving as the university’s director of public relations in the 1960s and 70s, Parrish held several positions at OBU, including assistant professor of journalism, director of alumni and annual giving, assistant vice president for development, vice president for institutional advancement and as executive vice president and chief financial officer. (Note: He attained the last two positions in 1995, where he remained until he officially retired in 2002.)

Parrish is also author of the book The Glory Years of Bison Basketball, a highly detailed review of the OBU dynasty of the mid-1960s, including the 1966 NAIA National Championship season.

== Honors and awards ==
In 2006 Parrish was elected president of the Oklahoma Higher Education Heritage Society.

On February 10, 2010, OBU awarded Parrish an honorary doctor of humanities degrees during the Founders' Day chapel service.

He was inducted into the Oklahoma Higher Education Hall of Fame on October 14, 2014.

Parrish and his wife, Mary Kay (Higginbotham) Parrish, have two children, John Michael and Robin.
