= Mark Brister =

American pastor and academic administrator

Mark A. Brister
- Education: Baylor University (BA); Southwestern Baptist Theological Seminary (MDiv, PhD)
- Occupations: Pastor, university president, humanitarian
- Years active: 1989–present
- Known for: President of Oklahoma Baptist University; founder of Mark Brister Ministries
- Title: Former President of Oklahoma Baptist University
- Website: Mark Brister Ministries

Mark A. Brister is a humanitarian, Baptist pastor, and former university president.

== Career ==
Brister served as a pastor at Broadmoor Baptist Church, a megachurch in Shreveport, Louisiana. Brister held this position from 1989 until he became the president of OBU in 1998.

Brister served as the fourteenth president of Oklahoma Baptist University (OBU) in Shawnee, Oklahoma. Brister became OBU's president on 1 September 1998 after the retirement of long time OBU president, Dr. Bob Agee. On October 12, 2007, Brister called a special board of trustees meeting and announced his retirement as university president. His last day in office was November 10, 2007.

In 2012, he was interim pastor of South Hills Baptist Church in Fort Worth.

After his resignation from OBU, Brister founded 'Mark Brister Ministries', which provides aid to villages in Bihar, India. Their work includes drilling water wells, providing medical clinics, teaching profitable trades and caring for orphans.

From 1994 to 1996 Brister was chairman of the Southern Baptist Convention program and structure study committee that reorganized the convention's agency structure.

Brister served on the Southern Baptist Convention (SBC) committee on committees and on the SBC's "Reaching America for Christ" Task Force.

He has served on the Glorieta/Ridgecrest Capital Campaign Cabinet for Lifeway Christian Resources (formerly the Baptist Sunday School Board).

He has been involved in volunteer missions in Scotland, Kenya, Mexico and Romania.

== Education ==
- Bachelor degree from Baylor University
- Master of Divinity from Southwestern Baptist Theological Seminary
- Doctor of Philosophy from Southwestern Baptist Theological Seminary
