= C. Pat Taylor =

American university president

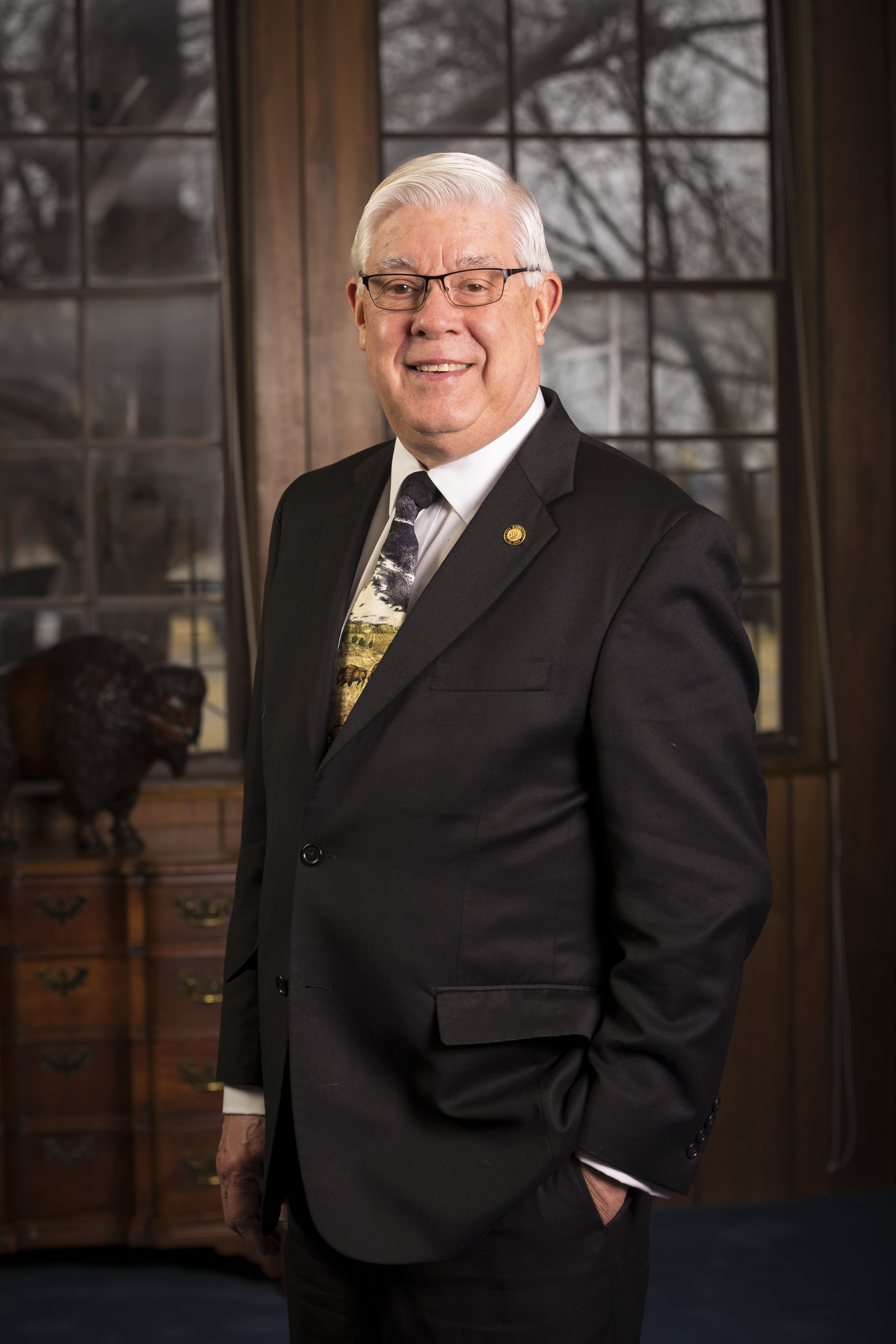

Interim President of Oklahoma Baptist University
- In office February 18, 2019 – January 1, 2020
- Preceded by: David Whitlock
- Succeeded by: Heath Thomas

24th President of Southwest Baptist University
- In office October 21, 1996 – August 31, 2018
- Preceded by: Roy Blunt
- Succeeded by: Eric A. Turner

Personal details
- Born: December 10, 1945 (age 80) Salem, Kentucky, U.S.
- Spouse: Judy Taylor (m. 1968; died 2016)
- Children: 2 daughters
- Education: University of Tennessee at Martin; Western Kentucky University; Memphis State University
- Profession: University Administrator

Charles Pat Taylor (born December 10, 1945) is a retired American university president. Taylor served over 20 years as President of Southwest Baptist University, and his most recent role was as the interim president of Oklahoma Baptist University. He retired from OBU when Heath Thomas assumed the role of president on January 1, 2020.

== Experience ==
Taylor previously served as president of Southwest Baptist University for 22 years. Taylor was selected as the 24th president of Southwest Baptist University by the board of trustees on August 20, 1996, after a seven-month nationwide search. He assumed his duties as president on October 21, 1996. In January 2018, Taylor announced his retirement effective August 31, 2018, after nearly 22 years as University president. Taylor returned to Oklahoma Baptist University to serve as interim president after the retirement of former president, David Whitlock. Heath Thomas replaced Taylor as president in January, 2020.

Prior to becoming president of SBU, Taylor served as chief academic officer, senior vice president and provost at Oklahoma Baptist University in Shawnee, Oklahoma for ten years. Taylor was responsible for OBU's academics, student development, admissions, religious life, library services and athletics from 1986 to 1996.

Taylor previously served as associate vice president for academic affairs at Union University in Jackson, Tennessee, from 1979 to 1986. From 1975 to 1979, he was an assistant professor of education at Belmont University in Nashville, Tennessee. While at Belmont, he served as head resident of Pembroke Hall, a men's dormitory housing 150 men. His experiences also have included community college and high school teaching and coaching.

== Education ==
A native of Salem, Kentucky, Taylor received his doctor of education degree with emphasis in history and philosophy of education from Memphis State University. He received a master's degree in history from Western Kentucky University and a bachelor's degree in history and secondary education from the University of Tennessee at Martin.

== SBU highlights ==
After Taylor's arrival at SBU, the campus completed several major building and renovation projects including:

- Jester Learning Center
- University Grand Entrance
- Meyer Wellness Center
- Renovation of Taylor Free Enterprise Center
- Renovation of Chapel
- Renovation of Jim Mellers Conference Center
- Plaster Athletic Facility
- Allen Walk of Life
- Major campus beautification and landscaping projects
- Campaign fundraising of a $62,000,000 plus

== Family ==
Taylor and his wife, Judy, were married in 1968 and have two children. Marijo is a 1994 Oklahoma Baptist University graduate and in 2000 received an Executive MBA from the University of Missouri. She is a criminal investigator and is married to Tom Gronewold. Charla, also an Oklahoma Baptist University graduate, completed her master's degree in physical therapy from SBU in 2001 and her doctorate in physical therapy in 2007. Her husband, Adam Austermann, is a 1999 Southwest Baptist University graduate. He earned his master's degree in physical therapy from SBU in 2001 and his doctorate in physical therapy in 2006. Taylor has two grandsons, Drew Charles Austermann and Luke Taylor Austermann. Judy died on March 26, 2016.
