= Hannibal–LaGrange University =

Christian university in Hannibal, Missouri, US

Hannibal-LaGrange University
- Former names: LaGrange Male and Female Seminary (1858–1928); Hannibal College (????–1928); Hannibal–LaGrange College (1928–2010)
- Motto: Scientia ad serviendum ("Knowledge for Service")
- Type: Private university
- Established: 1858
- Religious affiliation: Baptist
- Students: 499 (2024)
- Location: Hannibal, Missouri, United States; 39°43′50″N 91°23′31″W
- Colors: Scarlet & Navy Blue
- Nickname: Trojans
- Sporting affiliations: NAIA – American Midwest
- Mascot: Trojan
- Website: hlg.edu

Hannibal–LaGrange University (HLGU), formerly Hannibal–LaGrange College, is a private Christian university in Hannibal, Missouri, United States. It is affiliated with the Missouri Baptist Convention, which is part of the Southern Baptist Convention. As of 2024, 499 students are enrolled (452 undergraduate and 47 graduate), and 29 majors are offered. The university is accredited by the Higher Learning Commission.

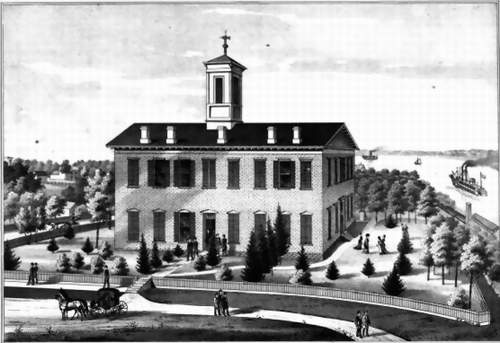
Mid-1870s sketch of La Grange College

== History ==
Hannibal–LaGrange University was created as the result of the 1928 merger of LaGrange College (founded in 1858 as the LaGrange Male and Female Seminary) in LaGrange, Missouri, and Hannibal College in Hannibal. In October 2022, the trustees at Hannibal–LaGrange University elected Robert Matz as the 18th president of the university. Living former presidents include Anthony W. Allen (17th president), Woodrow Burt (16th president), Paul Brown (15th president), and Larry Lewis (14th president), a graduate of Luther Rice Seminary, who left HLGU to be the president of the Southern Baptist Convention's Home Mission Board (now the North American Mission Board), one of the largest mission agencies in the world.

In 2010, the Missouri Baptist Convention voted to change the institution's name to Hannibal–LaGrange University after a bid to change the name to "University of Hannibal" was voted down.

As a Christian school, the university was granted an exception to Title IX in 2015 which allows it to legally discriminate against protected classes (religion, sexual orientation, gender identity).

Following several years of declining enrollment, Hannibal–LaGrange University experienced severe financial challenges in 2021 and 2022. These challenges were exacerbated by the COVID-19 pandemic with enrollment declining to 780 students in 2021, down from over 1,000 students a decade prior. The institution raised $1.5 million in the span of a few months in early 2022 but needed $2.2 million to pay outstanding debts. As a result, numerous faculty and staff were fired, salaries reduced, retirement matching eliminated and programs closed. All faculty contracts were terminated as a result of the institution's declaration of financial exigency. Faculty contracts were restored in August 2022.

== Academics ==
The university is accredited by the Higher Learning Commission. In November 2022, the commission placed HLGU on probation because it determined that the institution was out of compliance with HLC requirements as a result of its financial issues, lack of autonomy of its governing board, and issues related to sufficiency of faculty and staff. Probation was removed and full accreditation was reinstated on October 31, 2024. based on HLGU's ability to demonstrate that it was in full compliance with HLC requirements.

Hannibal–LaGrange University offers undergraduate programs and three fully online graduate programs: a Master of Science in Education, a Master of Arts in Leadership, and a Master of Arts in Counseling (Non CACREP).

== Athletics ==
Roland Fine Arts Center beyond a campus athletic area

The Hannibal–LaGrange athletic teams are called the Trojans. The university is a member of the National Association of Intercollegiate Athletics (NAIA), primarily competing in the American Midwest Conference (AMC) since the 1986–87 academic year. They are also a member of the National Christian College Athletic Association (NCCAA), primarily competing as an independent in the North-Central Region of the Division I level.

Hannibal–LaGrange competes in eight intercollegiate varsity sports: Men's sports include baseball, basketball, cross country, golf, soccer, and track & field; while women's sports include basketball, cross country, golf, soccer, softball, track & field and volleyball. Former sports include wrestling, swimming, shooting sports, and men's volleyball.

== Notable alumni ==
- Jefferson R. Boulware, Illinois state representative and lawyer
- Clarence Cannon, Democratic Congress member
- Homer Martien Cook, president of Northwest Missouri State University
- Cotton Fitzsimmons, NBA and college basketball coach. Naismith Basketball Hall of Fame
- Asa Hodges, U.S. Representative
- Lindell Shumake, member of the Missouri House of Representatives
- Ashleigh Spencer, Australian basketball player who currently plays for the South Adelaide Panthers in the Australian Women's National Basketball League
- Jered Taylor, former member of the Missouri House of Representatives
