= The Journey church =

Baptist church in Missouri

The Journey is a Baptist church located in St. Louis, Missouri. It is affiliated with the Southern Baptist Convention. Services are offered at multiple churches in St. Louis, including University City, Tower Grove, West County, and Bayless.

== History ==
The Journey was founded in 2001 by former lead pastor Darrin Patrick. Initial services were held in private residences and community centers. As attendance increased, the church formed a relationship with Hanley Road Baptist Church of Clayton and began operating out of its offices and having services within its sanctuary. In 2012, the two churches merged.

In February 2019, after seven years as a Journey church, The Journey Southern Illinois was equipped, resourced, and sent out to engage the community of southern Illinois as their own local church.

In January 2023, Pastor Gilbert transitioned off staff to lead Faith Family Church in Shiloh, Illinois.
