= Oklahoma Baptist University =

Baptist university in Shawnee, Oklahoma, US

Coordinates: 35°21′35″N 96°55′51″W

- Former name: The Baptist University of Oklahoma (1910–1920)
- Motto: Eruditione Religioneque Veritas
- Type: Private university
- Established: 1910; 116 years ago
- Founder: Baptist General Convention of Oklahoma
- Parent institution: Baptist General Convention of Oklahoma
- Religious affiliation: Baptist
- Endowment: $140 million (2019)
- President: Heath Thomas
- Faculty: 113
- Students: 1,514 (Fall 2023)
- Location: Shawnee, Oklahoma, United States
- Campus: Urban, 210+ acres
- Colors: Green & Gold
- Nickname: Bison
- Sporting affiliations: NCAA Division II – Great American
- Website: okbu.edu
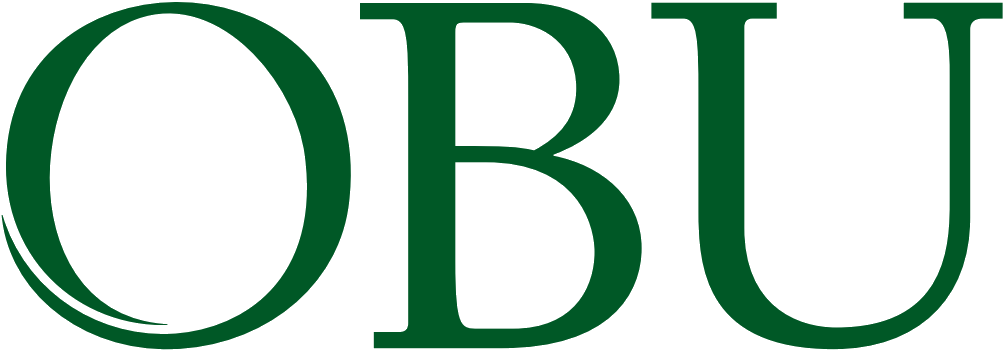

Oklahoma Baptist University (OBU) is a private Baptist university in Shawnee, Oklahoma. It was established in 1910 under the original name of The Baptist University of Oklahoma. OBU is owned and was founded by the Baptist General Convention of Oklahoma.

== History ==
A commission to plan the founding of a co-educational Baptist University in Oklahoma was established by the Baptist General Convention of Oklahoma in 1906 (one year prior to Oklahoma statehood) while in session in Shawnee. At the second annual meeting of the Baptist General Convention of Oklahoma (BGCO) at Ardmore in November 1907, the Baptist Education Commission unanimously passed a resolution stating its sense that "as soon as practicable a new Baptist University be established". A board of trustees was elected soon thereafter in 1907. A site for the university was sought, and from 1908–1909 negotiations were held with entities in El Reno, Lawton, Chickasha and Oklahoma City without reaching agreeable terms.

At the 1910 annual meeting of the BGCO in Enid, the trustees reported that Shawnee had been selected as the site of the new university and that an incorporation certificate for "the Baptist University of Oklahoma" had been issued by the State of Oklahoma on February 9, 1910.

Plans for the administration building had been drawn and a contract for construction of the building had been signed on June 3, 1910. The total estimated cost to construct, equip, and furnish the building was $140,000 (equivalent to approx. $4.4 million in 2023).

In 1915, Shawnee Hall housed faculty, staff, classrooms, library, an auditorium which doubled as a gymnasium, and the women's dormitory. Shawnee Hall did not house male students, as they were housed in two privately owned off-campus homes, known as "Hill Hall" (located half of a block south of the intersection of Kickapoo and MacArthur streets) and "Douglas Hall" (located on south University street where Bailey Business Center now stands). Shawnee Hall did not provide enough space for women's housing, therefore, in 1916 ground was broken on a new dormitory for women. The new residential unit was opened in 1917 and named Montgomery Hall, in honor of Dr. and Mrs. D.M. Montgomery, who provided significant financial support for the project. Montgomery Hall served as a dormitory, the fine arts center, the student center, and the location for administrative services. The original Montgomery Hall was located between Shawnee Hall and WMU Memorial Dormitory on the campus oval. The building was removed in 1989 due to structural concerns and a new Montgomery Hall was located on south University street west of the Bailey Business Center. From 1919 to 1928, campus facilities consisted of three buildings, Shawnee Hall, Montgomery Hall, and the combination men's dormitory and gymnasium. In the mid 1920s under the leadership of Berta K. Spooner; Executive Secretary-Treasurer of the Oklahoma Women's Missionary Union, Baptist women of Oklahoma recognized the need for a new dormitory for women on Oklahoma Baptist University's campus. After a fundraising effort to procure sufficient financial support for the new dormitory, groundbreaking occurred in 1927 for the new facility. When WMU Memorial Dormitory opened in 1928, the building housed rooms for 200 female students, the university dining hall, parlors, assembly rooms, a recreation room, an infirmary, and a swimming pool. Due to the challenges of "The Great Depression" in the late 1920s to the 1930s, it would be another decade before another building was constructed on campus.

On 14 January 1964, during final examinations week, the school narrowly missed disaster when a man flew a small airplane into Shawnee Hall. The man was a former student of the university who had been hospitalized for mental health problems. He rented the aircraft at Tulsa Airport; once airborne, he radioed Shawnee Airport to report his intention to crash into OBU's administration building.

Authorities evacuated Thurmond Hall, which had been the university's administration building since 1954, and moved students to Shawnee Hall, the primary classroom building, which had been the administration building prior to 1954. Police shot at the approaching aircraft before the pilot flew into one of the few empty classrooms in the building. The pilot was killed and the exterior impact area along with two classrooms were badly damaged. None of the 300 students, faculty, or other staff was injured. The pilot's son witnessed the crash.

Today, Shawnee Hall bears the scars of this incident. Although all damage has been repaired, the brick and mortar on the south side of the building is discolored in one area on the third floor when Shawnee Hall is viewed from the campus oval.

Enrolment passed 2,000 for the first time in 1989 and a record enrollment of 2,440, with 2,011 on campus, was set in 1994. In 1999, acquisition of land north of the campus enlarged OBU property from 125 to approximately 190 acres (0.77 km^{2}). Under President Mark Brister, by 2005, the university's endowment exceeded US$80 million. In 2007, OBU's International Graduate School opened in Oklahoma City, offering a master's of business administration degree. Acquisition of 10 additional acres of land at the southwest edge of the campus in 2008 increased OBU's property to 200 acres (0.81 km^{2}), and in 2010, the university celebrated its first centennial.

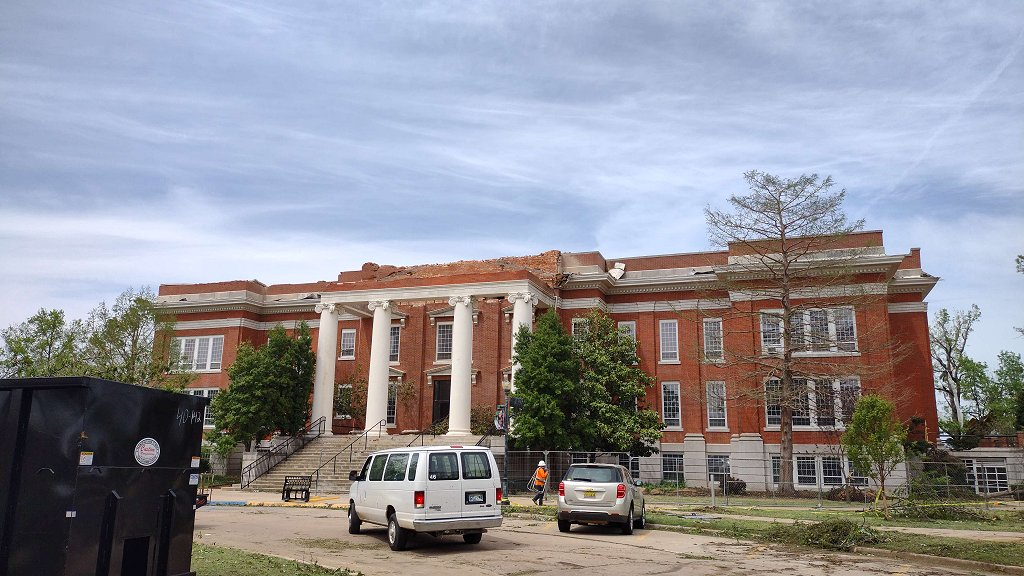
Damage to one of the campus structures following the 2023 tornado

The university was granted an exception to Title IX in 2014 which allows it to legally discriminate against LGBT students for religious reasons. A student LGBT group called Bison 4 Equality protested the Title IX exemption. Oklahoma Baptist University was ranked among the "Absolute Worst Campuses for LGBTQ Youth" in the US by Campus Pride in 2021.

In 2019, it received the St. Gregory's University campus as a donation from Hobby Lobby. However, this real estate was later traded in a land swap.

In 2020, a campus was established at the Lexington Assessment and Reception Center prison in Lexington, Oklahoma.

The campus was struck by very large, multiple-vortex tornado on April 19, 2023. Many buildings were heavily damaged, including large brick institutional buildings that suffered significant roof and exterior wall damage. The tornado was rated high-end EF2 with winds of 135 mph (217 km/h).

=== Presidents ===
- James M. Carroll, 1910–1912
- Frank M. Masters, 1915–1919
- Judson A. Tolman, 1919–1921
- John B. Lawrence, 1922–1926
- Warren W. Phelan, 1926–1930
- William Cooke Boone, 1930–1932
- Hale Virginus Davis, 1932–1934
- John Wesley Raley, 1934–1961
- James R. Scales, 1961–1965
- Grady C. Cothen, 1966–1970
- Robert Lynn (interim), 1971
- William G. Tanner, 1972–1976
- E. Eugene Hall, 1977–1982
- Tom Terry (interim), 1982
- Bob Agee, 1982–1998
- Mark Brister, 1998–2007
- John W. Parrish (interim), 2007–2008
- David W. Whitlock, 2008–2018
- C. Pat Taylor (Interim), 2018–2018
- Will Smallwood (Acting), 2019
- Heath Thomas, January 2020–Present

== Academics ==
Academic rankings

National
- Forbes: 510

=== Graduate degrees ===
OBU offers two graduate degrees through the OBU Graduate School, based in downtown Oklahoma City.

On February 20, 2012, The OBU Graduate School announced plans to relocate from Oklahoma City's Triangle District to the Baptist General Convention of Oklahoma building, located at 3800 N. May Avenue in Oklahoma City, in May 2012. The Graduate School has been located in the Momentum Building at 111 N. Harrison in downtown Oklahoma City since January 2007. The move will not affect the time frame of the existing cohorts in the Graduate School's programs. Dr. Scott Harris, director of the OBU Graduate School, cited the reasoning behind the move as more classroom space for existing and future programs, easier access in Oklahoma City concerning location (near Interstate 44 and Lake Hefner Parkway), and other educational endeavors.

=== Undergraduate core curriculum ===
In addition to courses on the Bible and in science, all students take courses in OBU's distinctive Western Civilization sequence, which includes a freshman-level course on ancient Greek literature and culture and then the sophomore-level, twelve credit hour, team-taught courses on the history and literature of the Western world from the Roman republic to today. The purpose of the Western Civilization sequence has been described by faculty member Benjamin Myers: "Knowledge of Western civilization—a true knowledge of its change and continuity over time—gives the student room to breathe intellectually, morally, spiritually, and emotionally. It frees the student from the tyranny of the moment, from merely fashionable, inevitably superficial ways of being in the world. Life in the fullness of time is a life more abundant than living in the prison of the moment."

== Campus ==
=== Location ===
OBU is located in northwest Shawnee, Oklahoma. The OBU campus, referred to as "Bison Hill" because a majority of the university is located on a small hill, contains over 30 buildings on 200 acres (81 ha). The campus is bordered by N. Kickapoo Street to the east, W. Midland Street to the south and N. Airport Drive to the west. W. McArthur Street runs through the north side of the campus, with the main campus lying south of the street and residential and athletic areas to the north.

In December 2018 the sale to Hobby Lobby of the Shawnee campus of the bankrupt St. Gregory's University, located at 1900 West MacArthur, was approved by the bankruptcy court. The campus, less than a mile to the west along MacArthur from the main OBU campus, was leased to OBU. In May 2019, OBU renamed the former St. Gregory's property the "OBU Green Campus" both in honor of the Green family, owners of Hobby Lobby, and in reference to the color green, one of the university's official colors. In December 2019, Hobby Lobby and the Green family donated the campus to OBU. However, in June 2024, OBU transferred the Green Campus to St. Gregory's Abbey, in exchange for other land owned by the Abbey.

==== Dr. John Wesley Raley Chapel ====
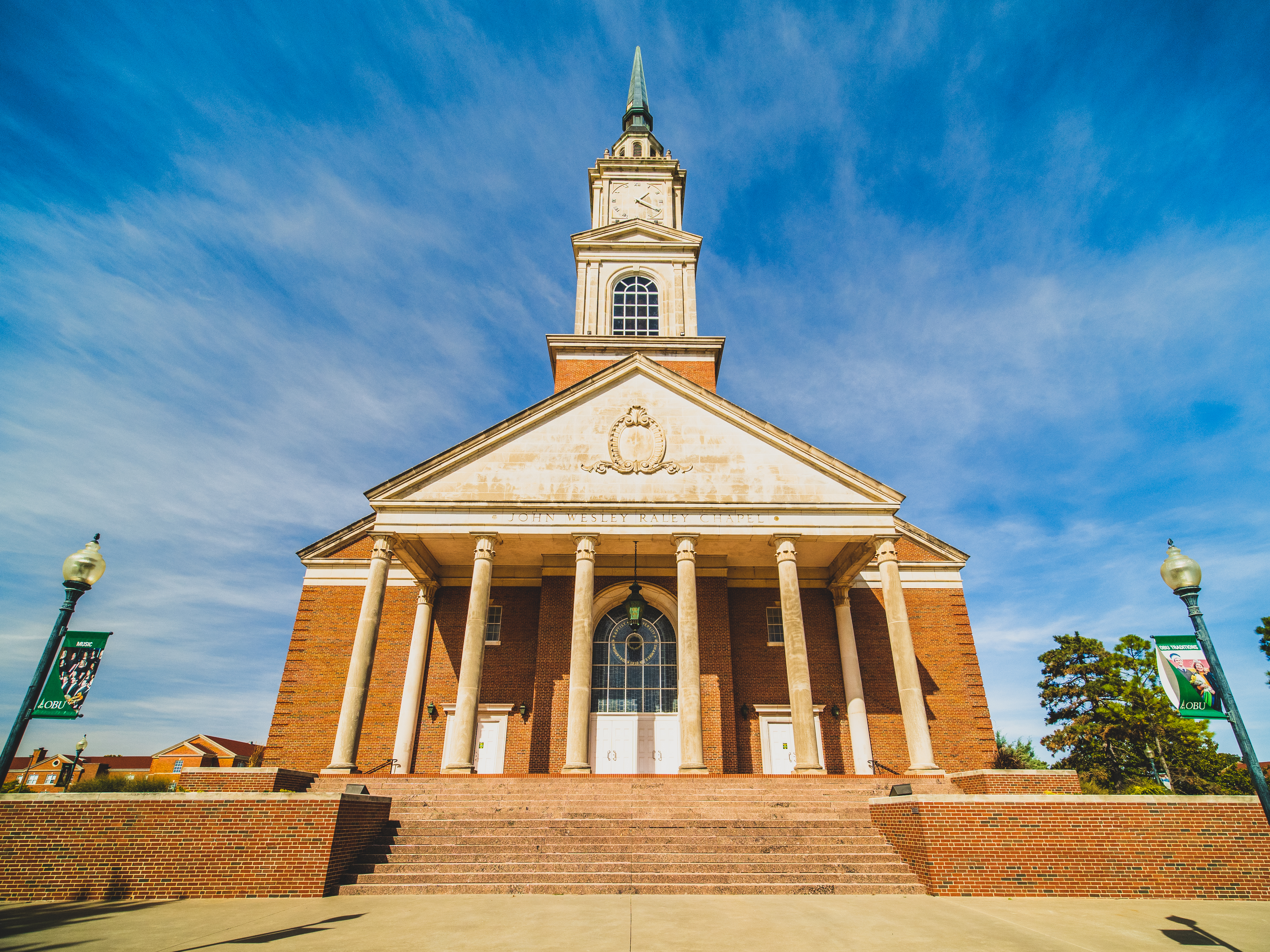
Raley Chapel, front entrance view

Constructed in 1961, the chapel is, from the top of the spire to ground, 200 feet (61 m) tall. As a result, the chapel's spire can be seen from several miles away on a clear day and is usually used as a symbol of OBU. The chapel was named in honor of John Wesley Raley, longest serving president of OBU, from 1934 to 1961, who then served as chancellor of OBU until his death in 1968.

Raley Chapel is home to two separate auditoriums. The Andrew Potter Auditorium has a seating capacity of 2,000 and features the 56-rank Van Deren Memorial Organ. On the lower floor, the W.R. Yarborough Memorial Auditorium seats 400. The Mabee Fine Arts Center in Raley Chapel houses music classrooms, studios, rehearsal rooms, and the office of the dean of the College of Fine Arts. Among the instruments in Raley Chapel is the McGavern Harpsichord, a two-manual French instrument constructed in 1974.

Along with the auditoriums, there are several classrooms on the northern side of Raley Chapel, including a small banquet hall named in honor of Helen Thames Raley, wife of John Wesley Raley.

On December 21, 2011, work began on the windows in the spire of Raley Chapel. AT&T reached an agreement with OBU to install a cell phone antenna in the chapel's spire. The existing glass and aluminum framing could potentially interfere with the antenna transmission, leading to the replacement project.

==== Shawnee Hall ====
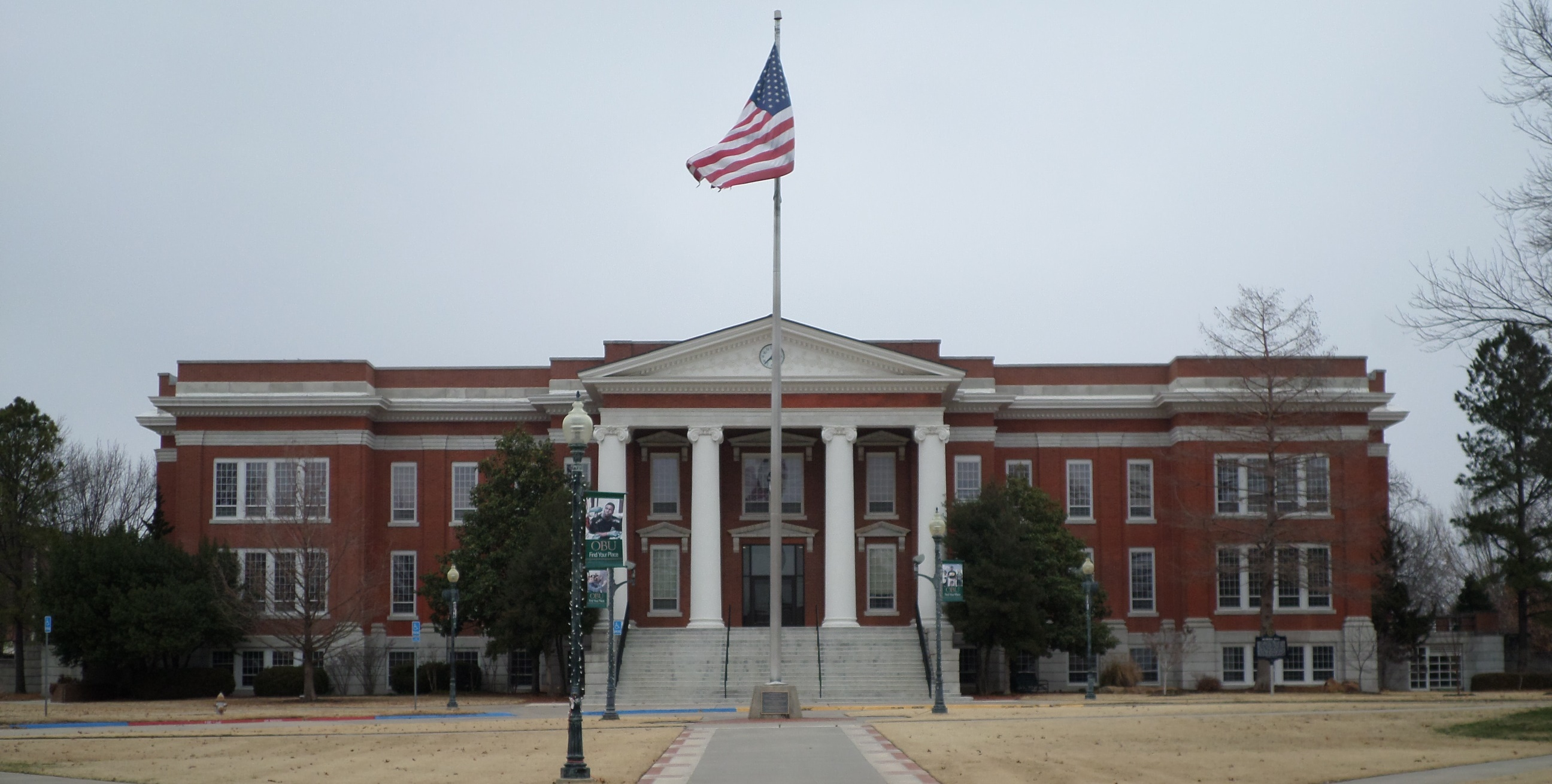
Shawnee Hall

Construction began on Shawnee Hall in 1911, but was not completed until 1915, when the school re-opened from its "suspended animation" period. The building was named in honor of the city of Shawnee, who donated the original 60 acres (24 ha) and a $100,000 cash bonus to the university. It was originally the administration building until 1954, when Thurmond Hall was constructed. Shawnee Hall occupies the northernmost point of the campus oval and houses classrooms. It also houses the Cleo L. Craig-Rhetta May Dorland Theatre, commonly called the Craig-Dorland Theatre, which was renovated in 2002 and houses OBU Theatre's main stage season productions.

==== Sarkeys Telecommunication Center ====
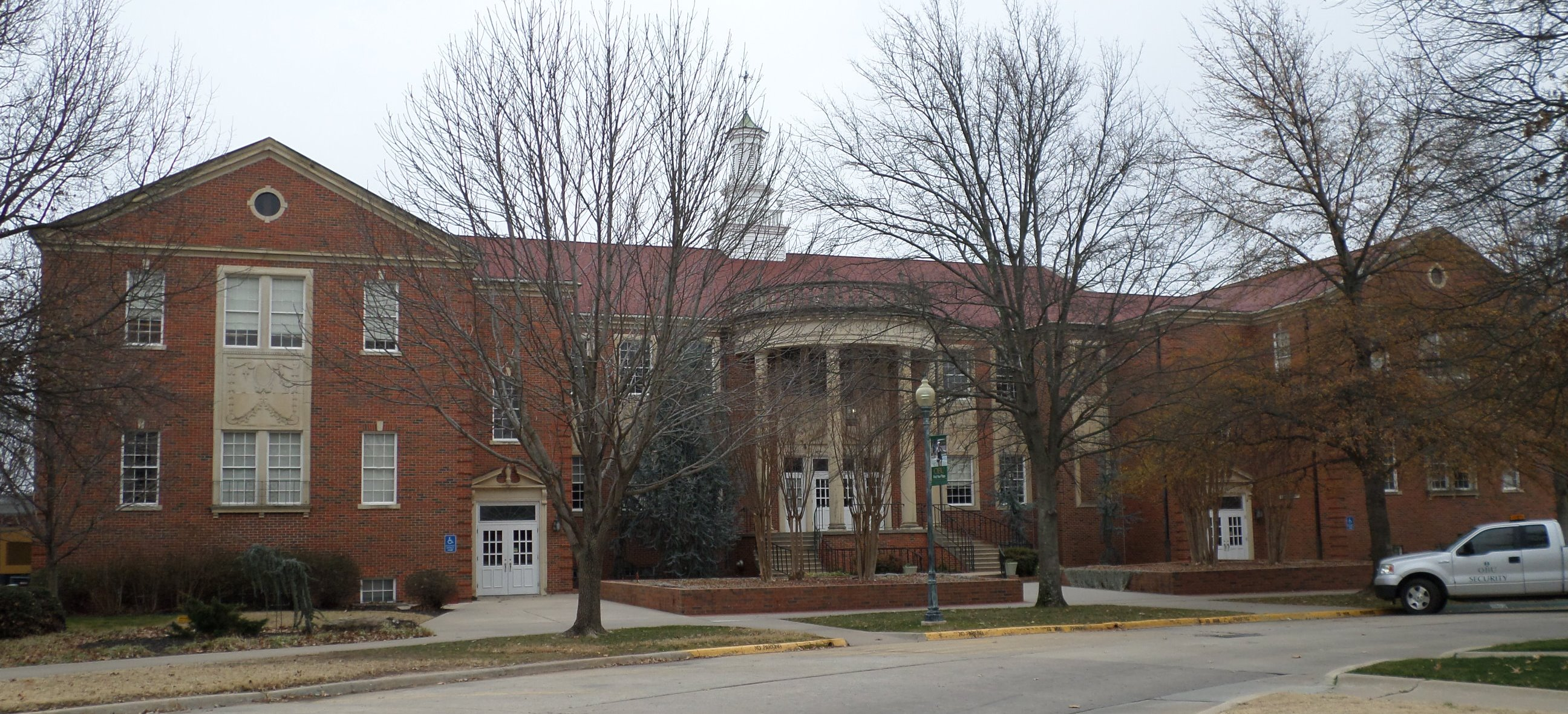
Thurmond Hall, university administration

Located directly north of the Geiger Center, this building opened in 1941 as the "University Gymnasium". It was the home of the basketball team until the opening of Bison Fieldhouse in 1948. From 1948 on, the building was used as an intramural gymnasium, auditorium, theater annex, and physical education locale until 1986, when it was heavily remodeled. The building, now known as Sarkeys Telecommunication Center, houses classrooms, conference rooms, and offices. It is also the home of the Sarkey’s Black Box Theatre, which is used for classroom showcases, rehearsal space, student lead events, intimate main-stage productions, and other campus events. (This theatre is not to be confused with the Sarkeys Performing Arts Center on the OBU Green Campus.)

==== W.P. Wood Science Building ====
The W.P. Wood Science Building was constructed in 1985 and is located on the southeast corner of the campus oval, north of the intersection of Kickapoo Street and University Drive. The building was named in honor of W.P. Wood, a Shawnee businessman. The lead gift of the building came from W.P. Wood Trusts. The building is composed of classrooms, the science department of OBU, and a chemistry lab.

=== Monuments and sculptures ===
While many universities have monuments to commemorate certain events in their respective lore and history, OBU has acquired many monuments in its 100-year history. Some of these monuments are class memorials donated for the beautification of the campus and some are donated from private, outside groups and churches.

- The sundial and pergola in front of Shawnee Hall, gifts from the class of 1922, remain the first ever-recorded senior gifts from a graduating class.
- In 1927, the senior class donated and built a brick and mortar archway sidewalk entrance located on the northwest corner of Kickapoo and University Streets. The Class of 1954 donated and built another brick and mortar archway on the southwest corner of the intersection, completing the east entrance of the campus.
- The Class of 1932 donated the bison statue and pedestal that stand on the northern part of the campus oval, directly south of Shawnee Hall. The bison statue is painted gold and the pedestal is made of brick and mortar with several other small bison adornments and a granite plaque commemorating the Class of 1932..
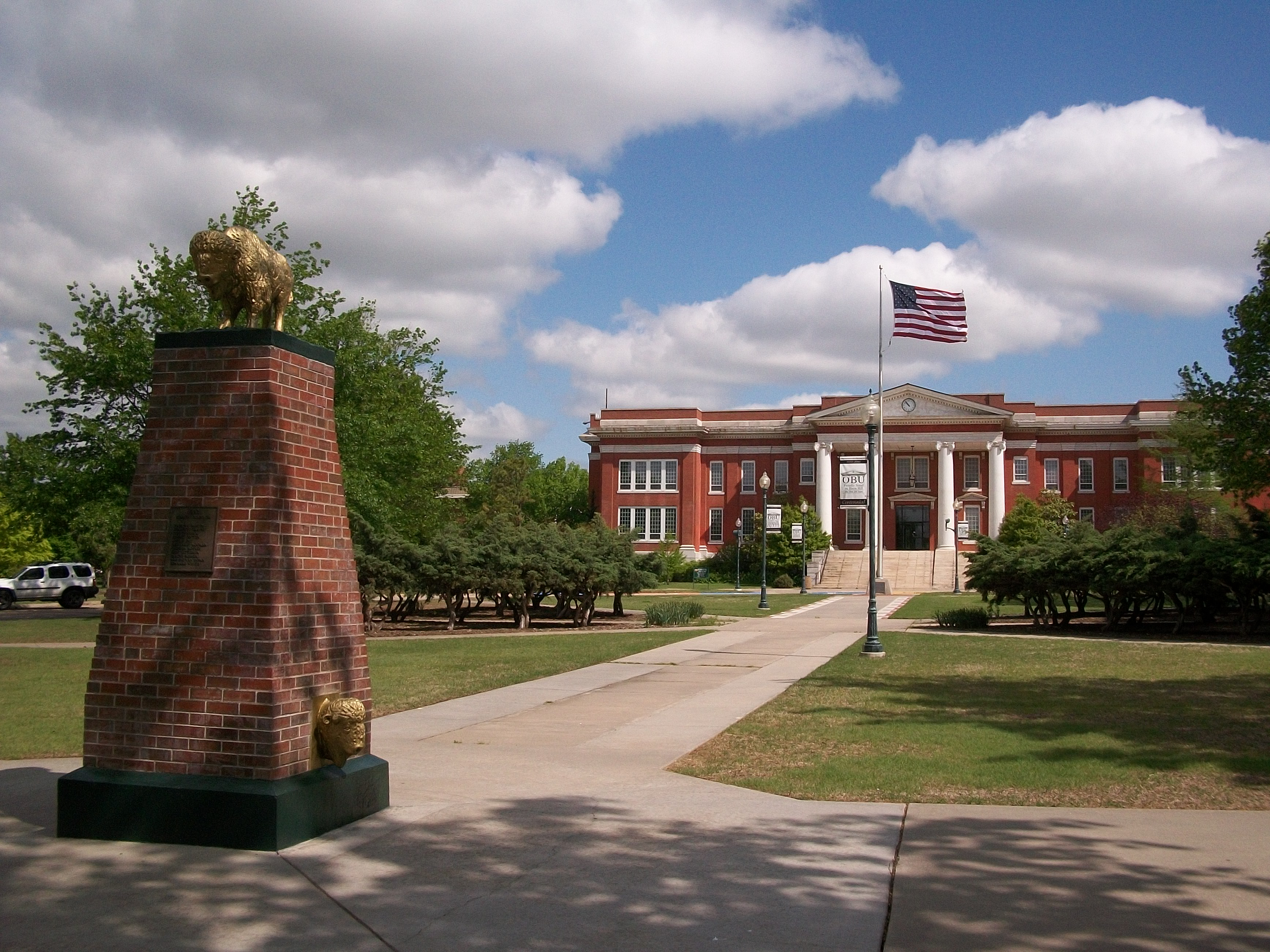
  OBU Campus oval
- The Class of 1935 donated and began a rock wall on OBU at that time. The wall, at its largest, extended from where Kerr Residence Hall sits, heading east until bending north from the intersection of University Street and Kickapoo, heading west along the southern side of MacArthur Street, completing at its terminus near MacArthur Street and Airport Road. In 2010, portions of the wall had to come down as a result of the widening of Kickapoo Street. As of 2012, the only portion of the wall that remains standing is the segment along the north side of University Street. Along with the rock wall, the class also donated a group of hedges which when viewed from the intersection of Kickapoo and MacArthur Streets, the hedges spell out "OBU".
- In 1938, the senior class of that year donated and built a fountain at the center of the campus oval. However, over the many years, the fountain fell into disrepair and eventually stopped working altogether. In 1991, the senior class of that year decided to restore the fountain to its original state. Working in conjunction with surviving members of the Class of 1938, the senior class of 1991 was able to raise the needed funds for the campus oval fountain's restoration. As of 2012, the fountain is in perfect working order and lights are fitted inside the fountain so that when viewed at night it alternately glows green and gold.
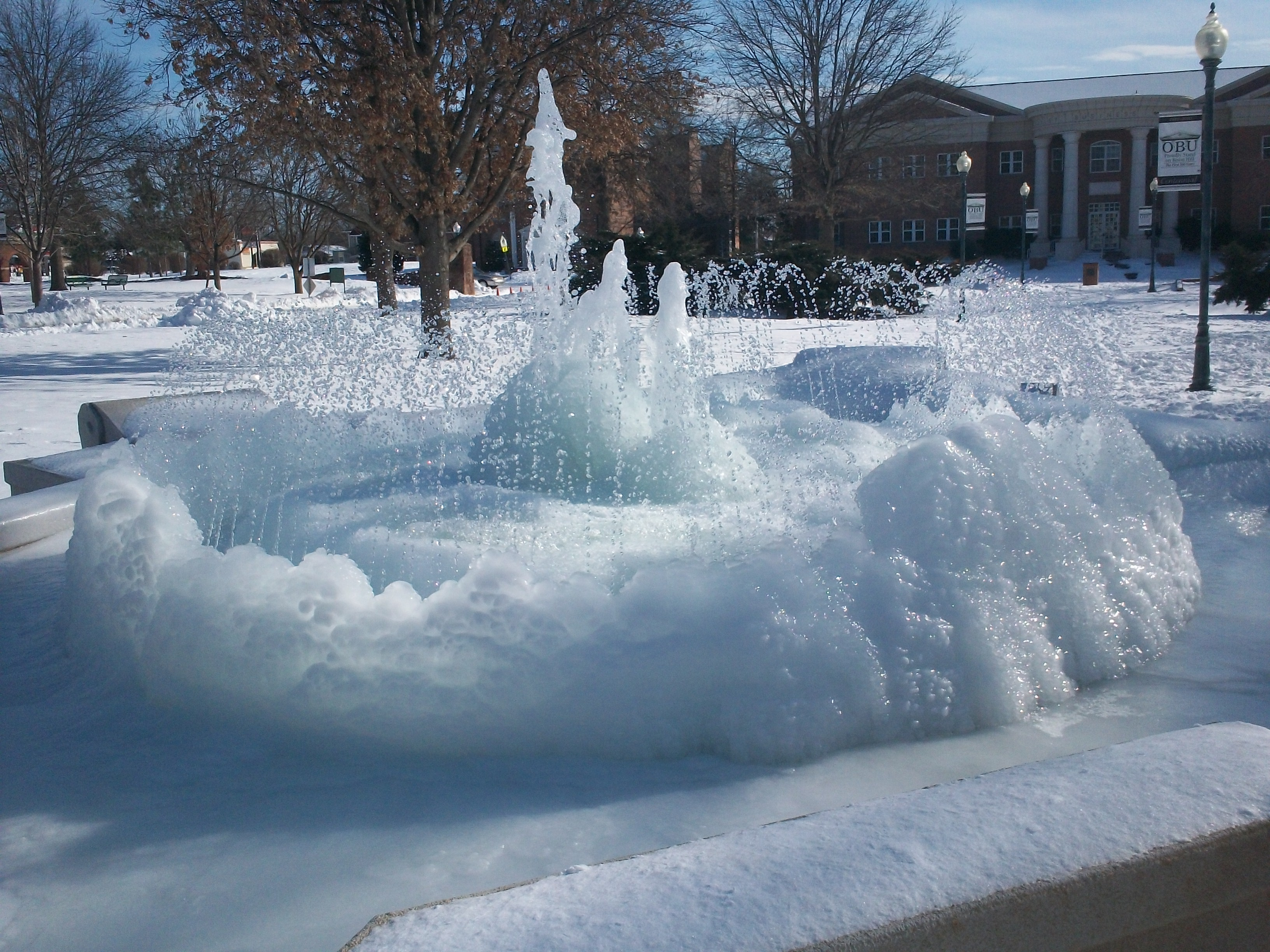
  OBU campus oval fountain after Groundhog Day blizzard of 2011
- The Class of 1945's class project was to build a memorial to the members of the OBU family who had perished in World War II. On, May 24, 1945, "Gold Star Park" was dedicated to OBU from the Senior Class of 1945. The monument stands today directly east of Ford Music Hall southwest of the intersection of University and Kickapoo streets. On the memorial is an inscription that reads, "Honoring Bisons 'Who more than self their country loved and liberty than life'". Each year, U.S. Military veterans from OBU and elsewhere gather at "Gold Star Park" on the anniversary of the dedication of the memorial to lay a wreath and for the playing of "Taps". This World War II memorial is believed to be one of the earliest memorials constructed in the state.
- Although there is almost no physical trace on the OBU campus proper of the university's participation in training soldiers during World War II, there remains one noticeable artifact. East of the intersection of Franklin Street and Airport Road, directly north of the Eyer building, there are two 6-foot-tall concrete square columns that once served as the checkpoint for the U.S. Navy Air base, which now serves as Shawnee's airport. The square columns are painted red, white, and blue and are adorned with a frieze of a golden-painted eagle on a blue background on both east and west sides. As of today, the square columns serve as one of the few reminders of OBU and the city of Shawnee's participation in the war effort.
- In 1948, the charging bison roadside plaque at the Storer Lane entrance to the university, was installed. The small drive, located on the west side of the Agee Residential Center, is named for Dr. James Wilson Storer, receiver of an honorary doctorate in 1939. The monument itself is about 6.5 feet tall and is located near MacArthur Street on Storer Lane.
- In 1952, the quadrangle clocktower was erected directly west of Shawnee Hall. The clocktower is around 25 feet tall, made of brick, mortar, iron, and concrete, features water fountains (fountains not working), and a concrete frieze of a charging bison facing each cardinal direction. The class of 1994 restored the quadrangle clock tower and added park benches.
- In 1956, an outdoor bulletin board was added. This class gift now stands as brick benches outside of WMU Memorial Dormitory.
- In 1983, the Peitz Plaza, named for Lawrence Peitz, was dedicated. The plaza, located between Raley Chapel and the Geiger center, features two small fountains, a rock waterfall, urban-style park benches, and several small trees. In 2010, a life-sized fiberglass statue of a bison, which features a colorful display of various artworks painted on the statue, was added onto the plaza.
- The Class of 1993, donated a new sign at the corner of Kickapoo and MacArthur directly southwest of the "OBU Hedges".
- A gazebo and park, located directly west of Stubblefield Chapel, were added on University Drive by the Class of 1996, and the campus signage project was provided by the Class of 1997. The Class of 1998 built the legacy wall, and the Class of 1999 continued the campus signage project. The Class of 2000 created Millennium Park, north of the campus near Taylor Residence Center, and the Class of 2001 provided the marble cross in front of Raley Chapel.
- The class of 2002 began work on the Truth Walk project, which was completed in 2004. The project includes granite stones engraved with scriptures, located directly south of Shawnee Hall and north of the bison pedestal.
- On August 1, 2011, a 6-foot (1.8 m) bronze statue of James R. Scales was dedicated on the Oklahoma Baptist University campus in his honor. The statue features Scales dressed in university academic regalia and rests on a 4-foot (1.2 m) brick podium, making the entire monument around 10 feet (3.0 m), altogether. The statue is located on the campus quadrangle, directly southwest of Shawnee Hall.
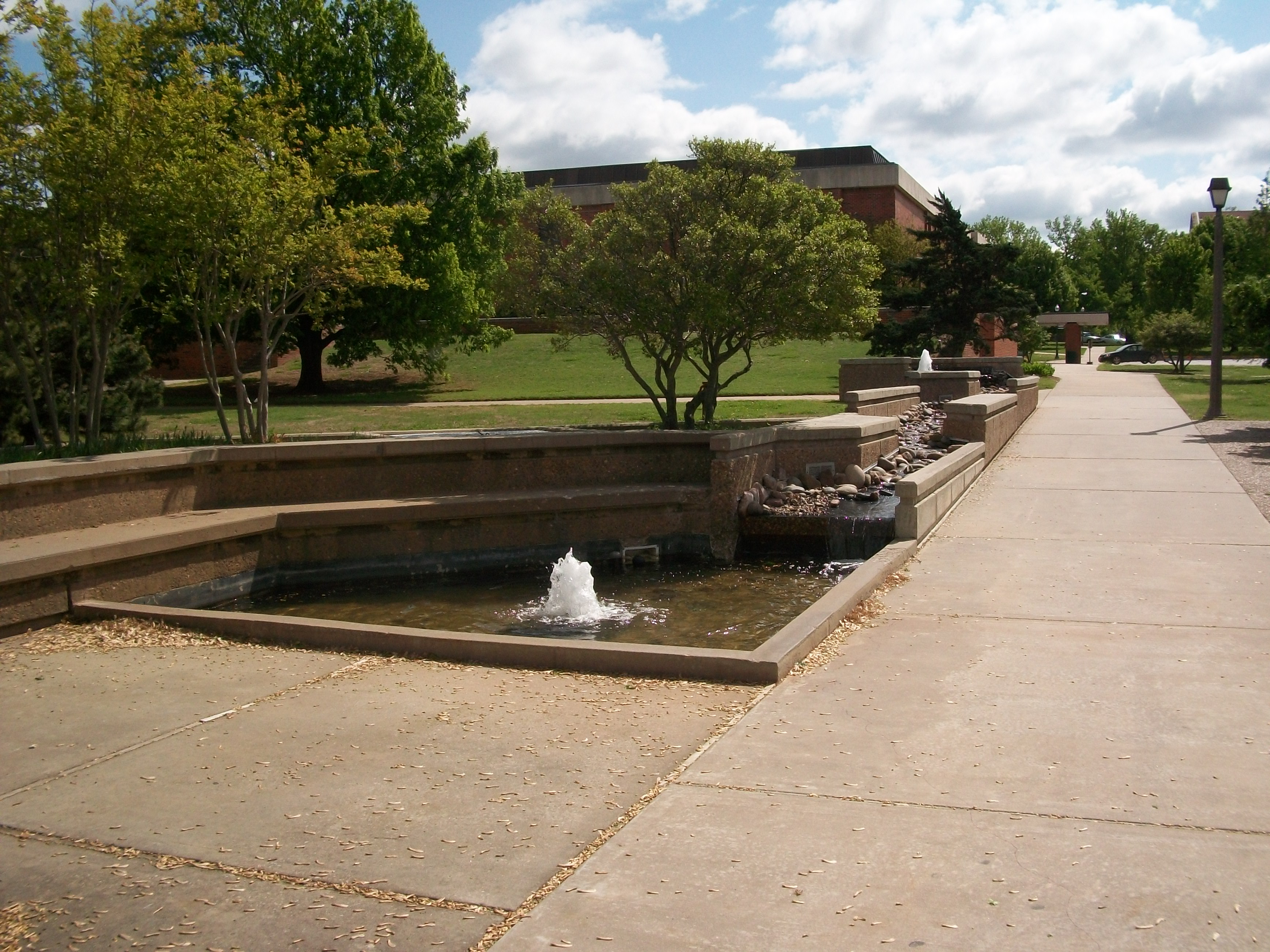
  Peitz Plaza

=== Residential life ===
OBU requires all unmarried students under 21 years of age to reside in university housing. The university operates two residence halls (Agee Residence Center and The Lodge) and three apartment complexes (East Devereaux, MacArthur and Midland) for men, and three residence halls (Woman's Missionary Union, Kerr, and Howard), one suite complex (Taylor) and apartment complexes (Howard Apartments, and West University) for women. Three apartment complexes are provided for married students (Burns, Cobbs and West Devereaux).

== Athletics ==
The Oklahoma Baptist (OBU) athletic teams are called the Bison. The university is a member of the NCAA Division II ranks, primarily competing in the Great American Conference (GAC) since the 2015–16 academic year.

=== Championships ===
OBU has ten NAIA National Championships: men's basketball (1966 and 2010); men's outdoor track and field (1990 and 2007); women's indoor track and field (2005, 2007, 2010 and 2011); women's outdoor track and field (2012); men's swimming and diving (2012 and 2013); and women's swimming and diving (2013).

=== Move to NCAA Division II ===
As of July 11, 2014, the NCAA Division II Membership Committee recommended the membership application for the institution to set up the move from the NAIA to NCAA Division II, competing in the Great American Conference, effectively the 2015–16 season.

=== Facilities ===
- Track

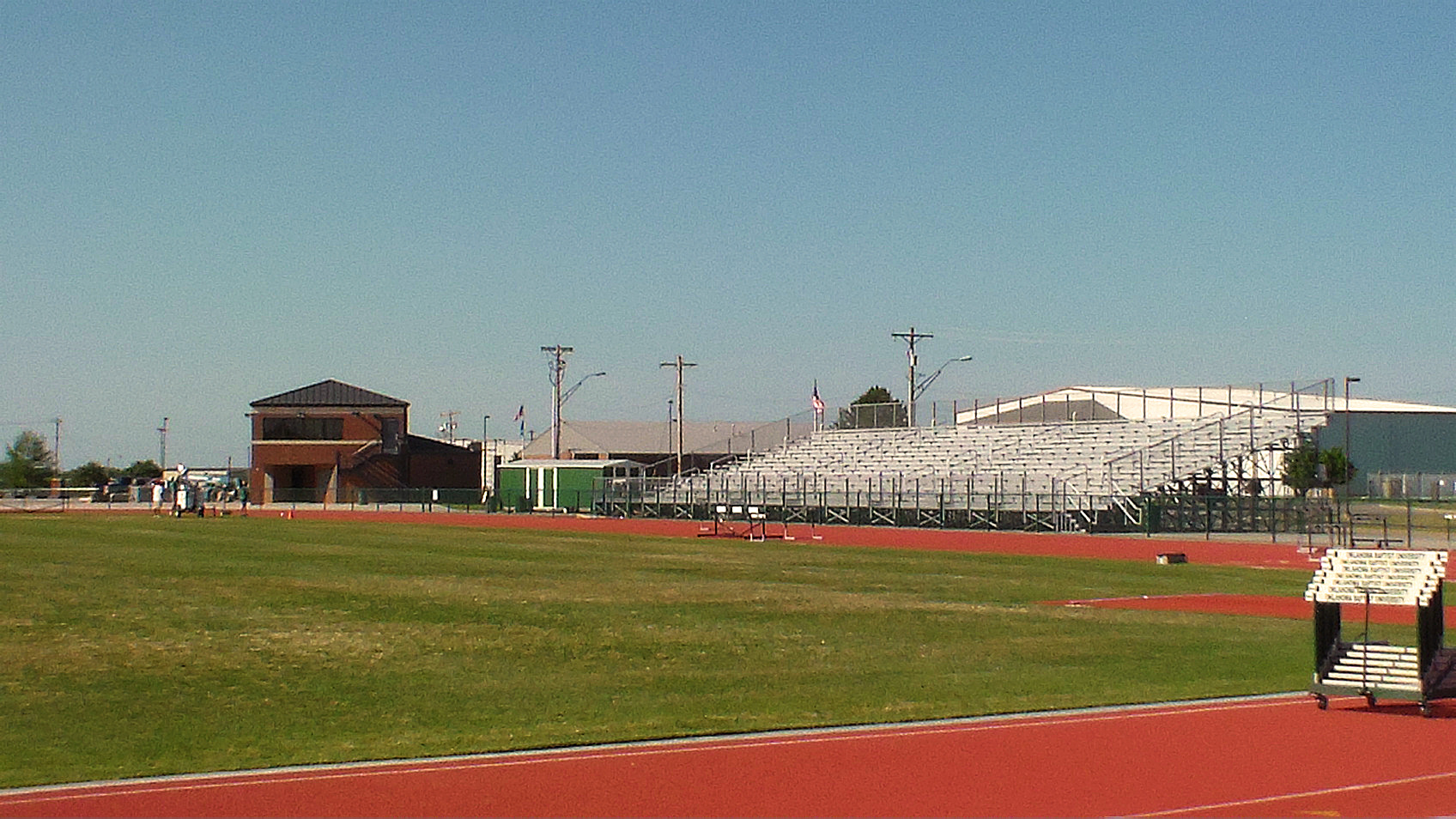
Eddie Hurt Jr. Memorial Track Complex

Oklahoma Baptist University opened its new track, the Eddie Hurt Jr. Memorial Track, just west of the old track in 2008. The track hosted the 2008 Sooner Athletic Conference Championships and is being improved daily. The track and field and cross country teams are housed in the Jay P. Chance Track Building, at the northeast corner of the intersection of University Street and Airport Road.

- Recreation and Wellness Center (RAWC)

The OBU Recreation and Wellness Center, home to the department of Bison Recreation and Wellness, (RAWC, pronounced "rock") was completed in 2007 and includes cardio and weight machines, a 29-foot (8.8 m) rock climbing wall, an indoor running track, three basketball-volleyball courts, three racquetball courts and a lounge. The RAWC serves the entire campus body in the ways of recreations and Wellness activities and opportunities. The facility is also home to the intramural and club sports programs, which include basketball, bowling, Flag Football, Free Throw Shooting, racquetball, Sand Volleyball, softball, tennis, volleyball, and Ultimate Frisbee.

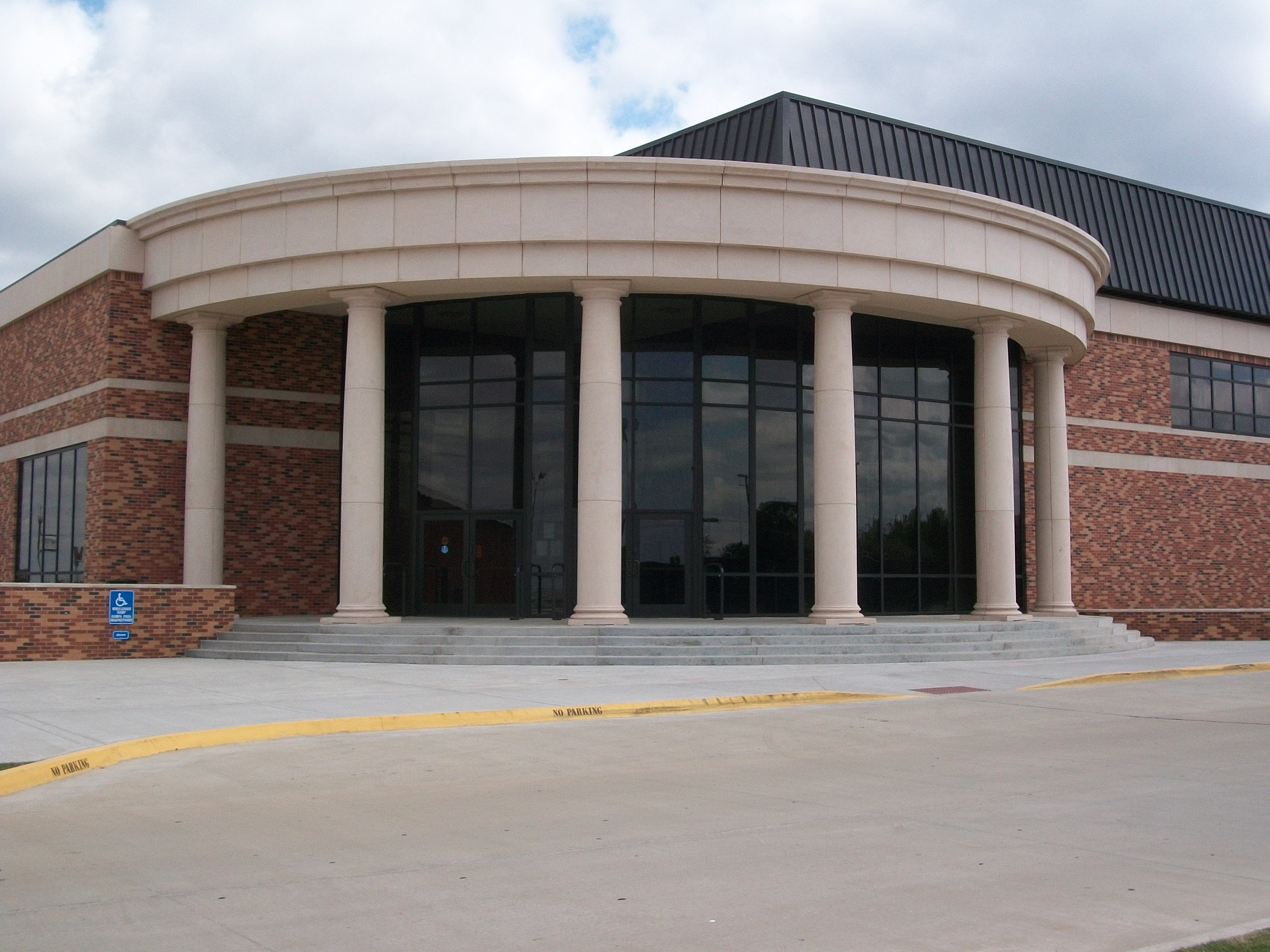
Front entrance to RAWC

- Clark Craig Fieldhouse

Located where the RAWC is at the present time, Clark Craig Fieldhouse originally served as a military recreational facility at Camp Maxey in Paris, Texas, during World War II. It was purchased, moved, and reconstructed on the OBU campus in 1948. Clark Craig Fieldhouse was the home of the Bison basketball team during the years the team reached three successive NAIA championship games, winning the national title in 1966. The teams moved into the OBU Noble Complex's Mabee Arena beginning in the 1982–83 season and Clark Craig was used primarily for intramurals and as an indoor training facility for OBU's spring sports. After years of athletic services, Clark Craig Fieldhouse was in deteriorating condition and on January 26, 2006, Clark Craig Fieldhouse was demolished to make way for the RAWC.

=== Recent sports at OBU ===
On December 16, 2010, Oklahoma Baptist University president David Whitlock announced that football, lacrosse, and varsity swimming teams would be added to the list of athletics. Beginning with swimming and lacrosse in 2012, and football in the fall semester of 2013, the number of intercollegiate sports played at Oklahoma Baptist University is 21 sports, 10 men's teams and 11 women's teams. This marks the first time since 1940 that Oklahoma Baptist University has fielded a football team.

On January 18, 2012, OBU announced the hiring of Chris Jensen to become head coach of the university's revitalized football program. Jensen comes to OBU from Southmoore High School, where he started the football program in 2008. In his and the program's second year, the SaberCats were 11–2 and reached the Class 6A semifinals. Jensen was named Oklahoma 6A-1 Coach of the Year in 2009. Jensen's coaching stops also include assistant posts at Westmoore (defensive coordinator), Bartlesville (offensive coordinator), Durant (offensive coordinator and assistant head coach), Moore (offensive line) and Little Axe (offensive line and outside linebackers).

=== Rivalries ===
Oklahoma Baptist University has several rivals throughout the Sooner Athletic Conference (SAC). Before the closure of St. Gregory's University, which was about a mile west from Oklahoma Baptist University on MacArthur Street in Shawnee, OBU had a rivalry with that school. As a result of the religious affiliations of both universities (St. Gregory's being a Roman Catholic institution), some sports writers referred to the athletic contests as "The Holy War on MacArthur Street". Although considered to be more of a basketball rivalry, the rivalry spilled into other sports such as baseball and soccer.

== Traditions ==
=== School colors ===
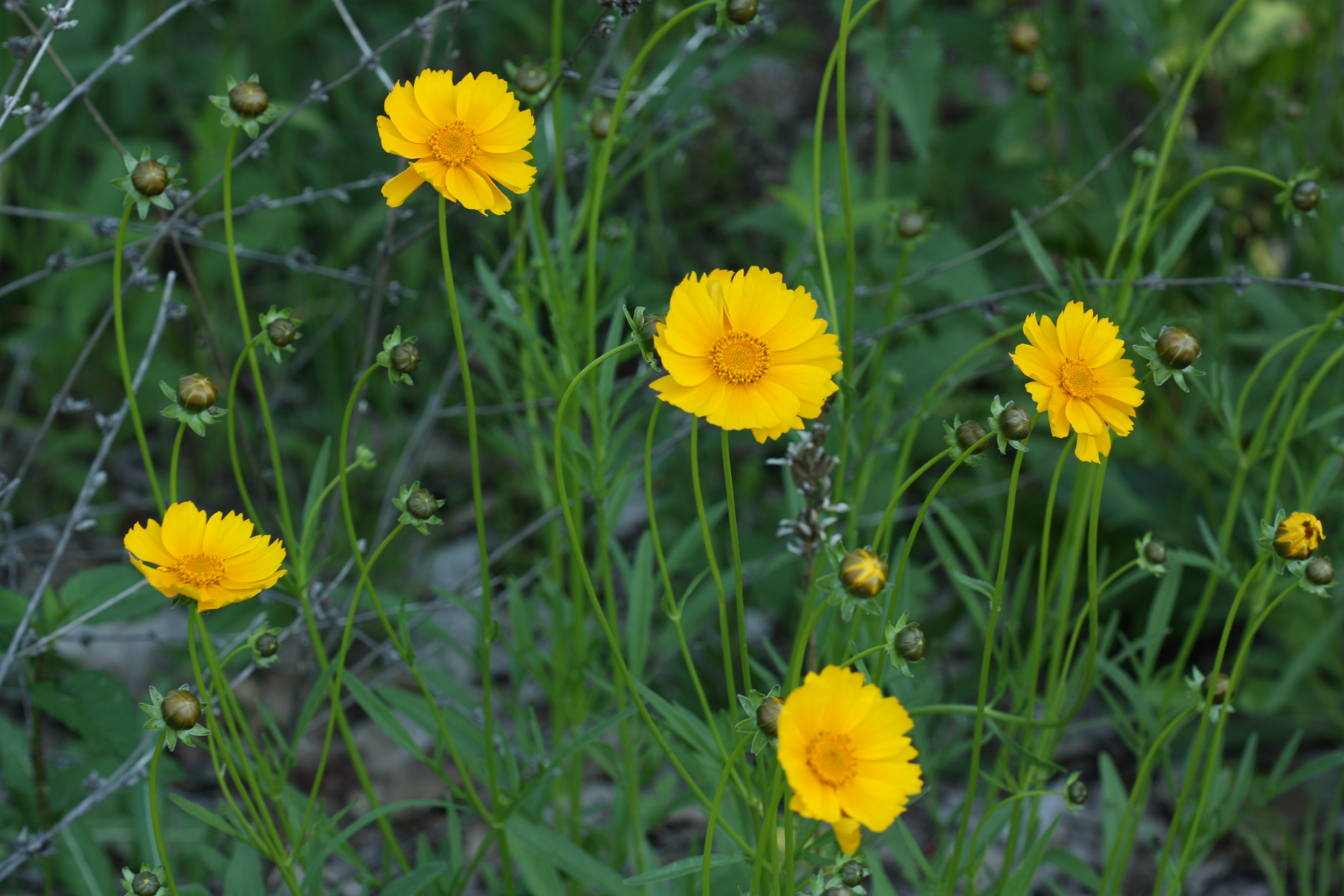
green and gold coreopsis

OBU's school colors of green and gold were chosen by students in the first year of classes because the school's future campus of 60 acres (240,000 m^{2}) of green prairie located northwest of downtown Shawnee was covered with wild golden coreopsis.

=== Mascot ===
Before OBU was established, what is now known as "Bison Hill" was a buffalo wallow. OBU founders nominated the American bison as a school mascot because they hoped that graduates would help meet the needs of the world as the bison met the many needs of the Native Americans. The bison was selected as the school mascot in 1918, and The Bison student newspaper was first published in December of that year. The bison statue and pedestal on the Oval were donated by the Class of 1932. In 1962, a student organization, known as "The Sacred Order of the Bison", brought to the campus a live bison mascot, which they named "Belshazzar". Belshazzars I, II, III, and IV lived in a pen near the fieldhouse and athletic fields and members of "The Sacred Order of the Bison" were responsible for the care of the mascot. However, in 1974, due to concerns from "The Sacred Order of the Bison" and students alike, Belshazzar IV was released from the confines of the campus pen and allowed to roam on a semi-natural ranch near Bartlesville, Oklahoma. Since 1974, Oklahoma Baptist University has had no live animal mascot. The university does have a male and a female student dress in bison mascot-animal costumes at some athletic and other special events. The newest addition to the mascot-animal costume, which previewed in the spring semester of 2013, became known as "Shaz". Students voted to name the bison mascot on the website at www.okbu.edu. The name of "Shaz" originated from a shorter form of Belshazzar, which was the original Bison mascot's name.

=== Welcome Week, Beanies and The Walk ===
"Welcome Week" is OBU's program of orientation for all new students prior to the start of the fall semester. New students are given a green and gold beanie that is worn throughout welcome week, taught the Ka-rip! spirit chant and the school song, and introduced to college life. Students also engage in a "Serve Shawnee" service project. On the night before classes begin, new students participate in "The Walk" from the Oval to Raley Chapel, mirroring the walk taken on graduation day. Beanies and the traditions concerning them have varied over the years, but the tradition of recognizing and welcoming new students to campus has been revived yearly for over 90 years. The tradition began in the 1919–1920 school year when the incoming freshmen students were the first to wear the beanies and the beanies were worn for a full year as a sign of penance. By 1925, the OBU student handbook stated that freshmen were required to wear their "Greencaps" on campus from the beginning of fall semester until Thanksgiving. In 1933, the student handbook said that freshmen were required to wear the "Greencaps" until the final home football game. At halftime of the final game, freshmen were permitted to burn their beanies. In 1968, freshmen were supposed to wear beanies between 7 o'clock a.m. and 11 o'clock p.m. while on campus during "Welcome Week". If the freshmen won the "Freshmen-Upperclassmen Tug-O-War", then they could dispose of their beanies. If they lost the contest, then they had to wear their beanies for another week.

=== Hanging of the Green ===
The "Hanging of the Green" is an OBU Christmas tradition that dates back to 1937 and is held on the first Friday in December to commemorate the holiday season. The events include a formal dinner, a musical production featuring familiar religious and secular Christmas carols, a dramatic production, honoring of senior students, and the adornment of Raley Chapel with wreaths, Christmas trees, and other Christmas ornamentation. The program has been varied through many years, but has always included Christmas greenery and honoring senior students. The first "Hanging of the Green" ceremony was held in 1937 in WMU dormitory. During that ceremony, students sang Christmas carols and hung ornamental Christmas wreaths around the building. Afterwards, the students took a candle from that ceremony to each of their respective residence halls. In 1945, the ceremony was moved to the W.L. Brittain Library and Fine Arts Center (now the Mabee Learning Center). In 1957, the ceremony was moved to the University Auditorium (now Sarkey's Telecommunications Center). With the completion of Raley Chapel in 1961, the "Hanging of the Green" moved to Potter Auditorium. 2011 will mark the fiftieth consecutive "Hanging of the Green" held in Raley Chapel's Potter Auditorium. In addition to the "Hanging of the Green", various other buildings and trees are decorated before Christmas.

=== Abandoned traditions ===
Freshmen orientation and "Welcome Week" were once unofficially known as "Freshmen Initiation". Freshmen were required to wear name tags and "Greencap", bow before upperclassmen, and memorize and recite "Bison Orientation Police", "Hymn to Alma Mater", "Ka-Rip", and a poem known as I am a lowly freshman.

The "Freshmen-Upperclassmen Tug-O-War" occurred the first week of "Freshmen Initiation". Preparations for the tug-of-war included: Watering the soil and ground where the freshmen were to stand for the contest, greasing the freshmen end of the rope, beginning the contest with upperclassmen of small stature, and gradually replacing them with much larger upperclassmen. The upperclassmen always emerged from the contest victorious.

"Freshmen Initiation", "Freshmen-Upperclassmen Tug-O-War", and "Bison Orientation Police" were eliminated in the 1980s and replaced with "Welcome Week".

== Events hosted at OBU ==
- OBU annually hosts the OSSAA State 1A, 2A, and 3A Vocal Contest. The majority of contest activities take place in Raley Chapel, where numerous high school choirs and ensembles warm-up and perform for contest judges.
- OBU, over the course of the past few years, has held a two-day camp in preparation for the OMEA (Oklahoma Music Educators Association) High-School All-State Chorus auditions. Usually this event takes place the second or third weekend in July.
- OBU also hosts a Christian youth camp called Super Summer every year for the first three weeks of June and is attended by youth groups from everywhere in the United States.
- OBU organizes and hosts an annual youth apologetics conference—Generation Why?—which hosts nearly 1,000 middle and high school students.

== Campus organizations ==
OBU recognizes more than 150 campus organizations with various interests and purposes, including student government, involvement, academics, music and arts, politics, social service, sports and religion.

=== Student Government Association ===
There are two branches of OBU's SGA: executive and legislative. The executive branch is headed by the Student Body President. The President is elected on a ballot open to the entire student body near the end of the spring semester. Anyone who is at least a junior and has a 3.0 grade point average is eligible to run for President or Vice President (see legislative section). The President works directly with the Board of Trustees and the University President. The SGA President also holds the power to sign bills for passage, or veto them. Along with the President is the Vice-President, who runs on the same ballot, the Speaker of the Senate, the Attorney General, and the Chief of Staff. Those three are appointed by the President and Vice-President, who are then approved by the Senate. The legislative branch is made up of elected senators from the student body. They hear bills and resolutions that can range from chartering official clubs on campus to allocating money for student activities. Five Senators are elected from each class, and eight at-large Senators are also elected. Furthermore, the four Class Presidents also serve as senators, for a total of 32. Each year, the Senate is given a budget (which is a part of the whole SGA budget), that they are vested with distributing to various campus organizations. Campus organizations and individuals petition the Senate for funds that go to various club activities and for competitions such as Model Arab League.

=== Campus Activities Board ===
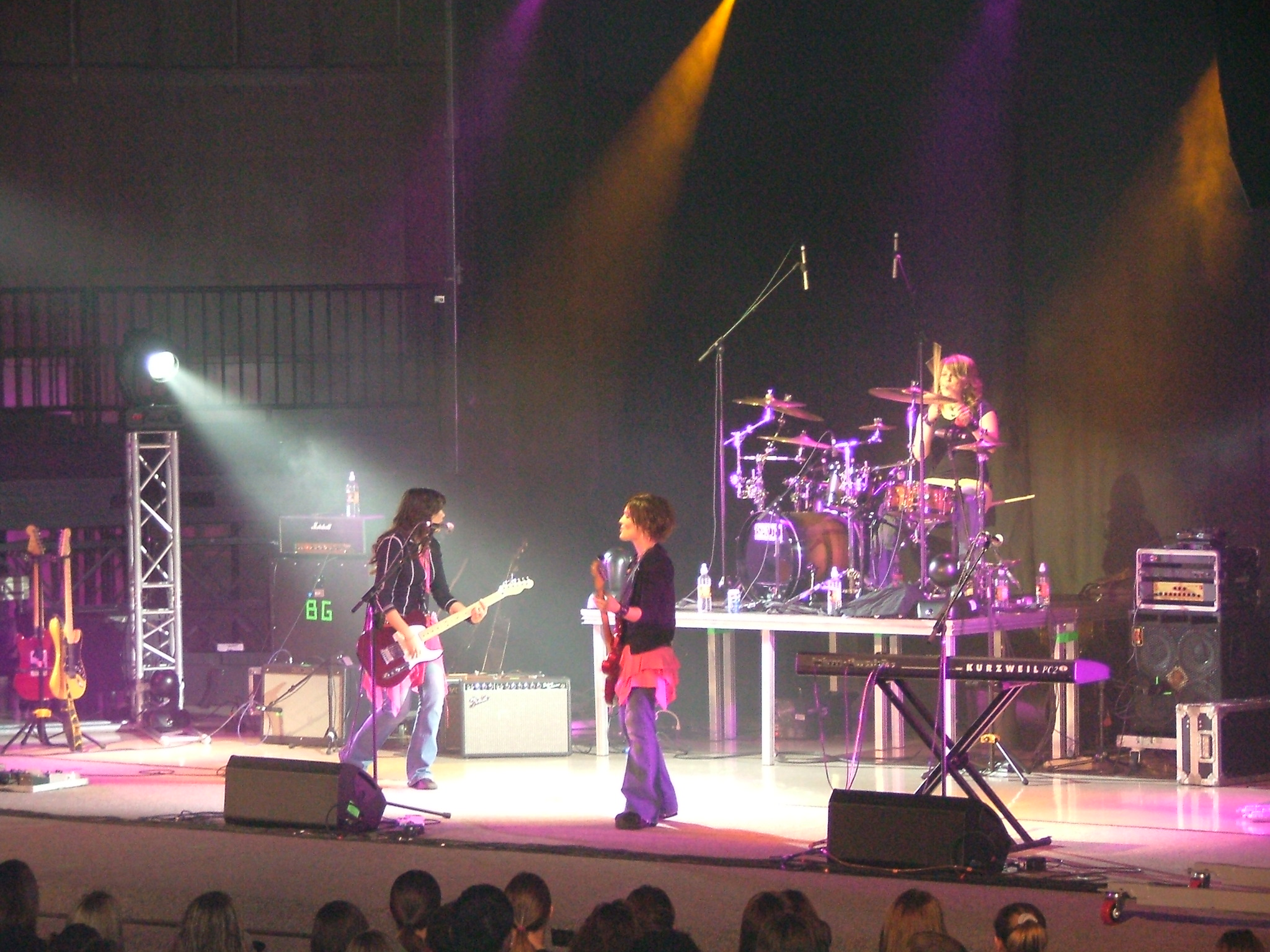
Barlow Girl performing on the OBU campus

Campus Activities Board (CAB) serves the university by sponsoring entertainment activities throughout the year. CAB sponsors three major talent and variety shows each academic year: Biggie, Freshmen Follies and Spring Affair. Biggie is reserved for upperclassmen, Follies for freshmen, and Spring Affair is open to all students. Acts and emcees for each show are selected through auditions. In additions, CAB also sponsors T.W.I.R.P. (The Woman is Required to Pay) Week and Christmas events including Kerr Old Fashioned Christmas, CAB/ARAmark Banquet and Kids' Christmas, and other community activities.

=== The Herd ===
The Herd is a student organization that assists in recruiting new students to OBU. The Herd takes part in events such as Fall, Winter and Spring Preview Day, Night on the Hill, Be a Bison Day, and Super Enrollment Day, along with various church and dinner events.

== Notable alumni ==
=== Science ===
- Sunday O. Fadulu, Class of 1964. Professor of microbiology and chairman of biology, Texas Southern University; patent holder for a drug treating sickle cell anemia
- Ralph Faudree, Class of 1961. Provost and professor of mathematics at the University of Memphis; has an Erdős number of 1, having written over 50 papers with Paul Erdős
- William R. Pogue, Class of 1951, Colonel, USAF (Ret.), NASA astronaut and pilot of Skylab 4 (third and final crewed visit to the Skylab orbital workshop), the longest crewed flight (84 days, 1 hour and 15 minutes) in the history of crewed space exploration to date

=== Education ===
- Robert L. Lynn, Class of 1953. President of Louisiana Christian University 1975–1997
- Courts Redford, Class of 1920. Former President of Southwest Baptist University; Executive Secretary-Treasurer (President) Southern Baptist Home Mission Board (now SBC North American Mission Board)
- Oral Roberts, Founder and Former President of Oral Roberts University
- Winston Tabb, Sheridan Dean of University Libraries, Johns Hopkins University
- William D. Underwood, Class of 1987. President of Mercer University; former interim president of Baylor University
- Carl M. White, Dean of the Columbia University School of Library Service

=== Media and arts ===
- Joel Engle, Christian recording artist and author
- Jim J. Bullock, ex 1976, American comedian, stage, television and film actor. He has starred in Too Close for Comfort, Spaceballs and Ned's Declassified School Survival Guide
- Bruce Fowler, opera singer
- Dennis Jernigan, Class of 1981. Christian singer-songwriter
- Jami Smith, Class of 1993. Christian singer-songwriter
- Jen Hatmaker, Class of 1996. Christian author, blogger, and speaker and reality show personality
- Christy Nockels, Class of 1996. Christian singer-songwriter
- Chung King-fai, Hong Kong television actor
- Fiona Rene, American actress, director and producer

=== Public officials ===
- Mary Fallin, Governor of Oklahoma, former Lieutenant Governor of Oklahoma. United States Representative, Oklahoma District 5 (Republican)
- Joel Hefley, Class of 1957. United States Representative, Colorado District 5, Republican
- Ralph B. Hodges, Class of 1952. Former Chief Justice of the Oklahoma Supreme Court 1965–2004
- Shane Jett, Class of 1997. Current State Senator, Oklahoma Senate. Former State Representative, Oklahoma House of Representatives
- Clark Jolley, Class of 1992. State Senator, Oklahoma Senate
- Robert S. Kerr, former United States Senator 1948–1963; former Governor of Oklahoma 1943–1947
- Debbe Leftwich, State Senator, Oklahoma Senate
- Huey Long, former United States Senator 1932–1935; former Governor of Louisiana 1928–1932
- David Lynn Russell Class of 1963, United States Federal Judge
- Kris Steele, Class of 1996. State Representative, Oklahoma House of Representatives

=== Sports ===
- Clay Martin, Class of 1999. National Football League (NFL) official
- Al Tucker, pro basketball player; 1967–68 NBA All-Rookie Team
- Julian Merryweather, (b. 1991) Major League Baseball pitcher
- Taylor Hearn (baseball) (b. 1994) Major League Baseball pitcher

== See also ==
- Southern Baptist Convention
- List of state and other conventions associated with the Southern Baptist Convention
