= Missouri Baptist Convention =

The Missouri Baptist Convention is the state convention of Southern Baptists in Missouri. Headquartered in Jefferson City, it operates as a network of nearly 1,800 independent Southern Baptist churches, which are divided into eight regions and 60 Baptist associations. Missouri Baptists elect an executive board that oversees the convention's ministries, which in turn are carried out by the Missouri Baptist Convention staff.

== Leadership ==
=== Convention officers ===
Missouri Baptist churches send messengers to an annual meeting to nominate and elect convention officers. The 2022–2023 convention officers are:

- President: Chris Williams
- First Vice President: Wesley Vance
- Second Vice President: Richard Young
- Recording Secretary: Justin Perry

=== Executive board ===
The executive board is responsible for overseeing the missionary, educational, and benevolent work of the convention. Messengers from Missouri Baptist Convention churches elect board members from each of the state's eight regions to serve three-year terms.

=== Executive director ===
The executive director is elected by the executive board. On October 13, 2011, John Yeats was elected the 20th executive director of the convention.

== Missouri Baptist Ministries ==
The Missouri Baptist Convention staff is engaged in more than a dozen ministries under the administration of five strategic groups:

Making Disciples. Ministries include evangelism; strategies for church leaders and families and age-graded training events and conferences.

Multiplying Churches. Ministries include discovering multiplying churches, sending churches, and church multipliers; training sending churches; mentoring, assessing, and training church multipliers; deploying church multipliers throughout Missouri, across the U.S., and around the world; and partnership missions.

Developing Leaders. Ministries include a statewide network of local church leaders, associational leaders, and convention staff members who work together to provide pastoral leader development and care; church revitalization; transitional pastor training; and disaster relief training and deployment.

Collegiate Ministries. These include ministries on 25 Missouri campuses; training events for collegiate leaders; a summer missions and mentoring initiative; international student ministry; equipping churches to reach out to nearby campuses; developing leaders to serve on new campuses; and coordinating mission experiences for students.

Executive Office. These include the office of the executive director; business services; property management; and the office of The Pathway, the official news journal of Missouri Baptists

Ministry Support. Ministries include creative services (graphic design, web and social media, and video); live-event support; technology; and Christian apologetics.

== Funding ==
Funding for the Missouri Baptist Convention is provided primarily through the Cooperative Program (CP). Missouri Baptist churches give a percentage of their budget to the Missouri Baptist Convention. Sixty percent of these funds stay in the state, while 40 percent is passed on to the Southern Baptist Convention for ministries conducted by the North American Mission Board, the International Mission Board, and others.

== Political activity ==
In 2012, more than 100 members endorsed Todd Akin for US Senate.

In 2022, state representative Suzie Pollock organized a session with Arkansas politician Robin Lundstrum at the Missouri Baptist Convention prior to presenting Anti-trans legislation in the Missouri House of Representatives.

In 2023, MBC lobbyist Timothy Faber testified against legislation that would add anti-discrimination protections to LGBT rights in Missouri and claimed such protections would burden Missouri Commission for Human Rights. Further questions revealed that Faber is chair of the commission, on appointment by governor Mike Parson.

In 2024, Faber was the only opposition testimony to a Missouri Senate bill outlawing child marriage.

== Affiliated organizations ==
In the early 2000s, five Missouri Baptist agencies, Missouri Baptist Foundation, Windermere Baptist Conference Center, Word & Way (newspaper), Missouri Baptist University and Baptist Home, changed governing documents to become self-perpetuating boards rather than have trustees chosen and/or removed by Missouri Baptist Convention. Following lawsuits, Windermere's changes were affirmed, however Missouri Baptist Foundation, Missouri Baptist University and Baptist Home were required to restore MBC oversight.

Other affiliates include Hannibal-LaGrange University, Missouri Baptist Children's Home, and Southwest Baptist University.
