= International Association of Baptist Colleges and Universities =

- Abbreviation: IABCU
- Formation: 2006
- Type: Non-governmental organization
- Members: 42 member universities
- Website: baptistschools.org

The International Association of Baptist Colleges and Universities (IABCU) is an association of Baptist universities. Its headquarters are in Nashville, Tennessee.

== History ==
It has its origins in the Southern Association of Southern Baptist Colleges founded in 1948. It replaced the Southern Baptist Education Commission dissolved by the Southern Baptist Convention in 1996 and became the Association of Southern Baptist Colleges and Schools. From 1998 to 2007, the Executive Director was Bob Agee. In 2006, it became the International Association of Baptist Colleges and Universities. In 2023, it had 42 member universities.
