= List of Southern Baptist Convention affiliated people =

This List of Southern Baptist Convention affiliated people includes notable individuals who are or were members of a church affiliated with the Southern Baptist Convention (SBC) or who are otherwise affiliated with the SBC.

== Presidents, preachers, theologians, authors and missionaries ==
=== Deceased ===
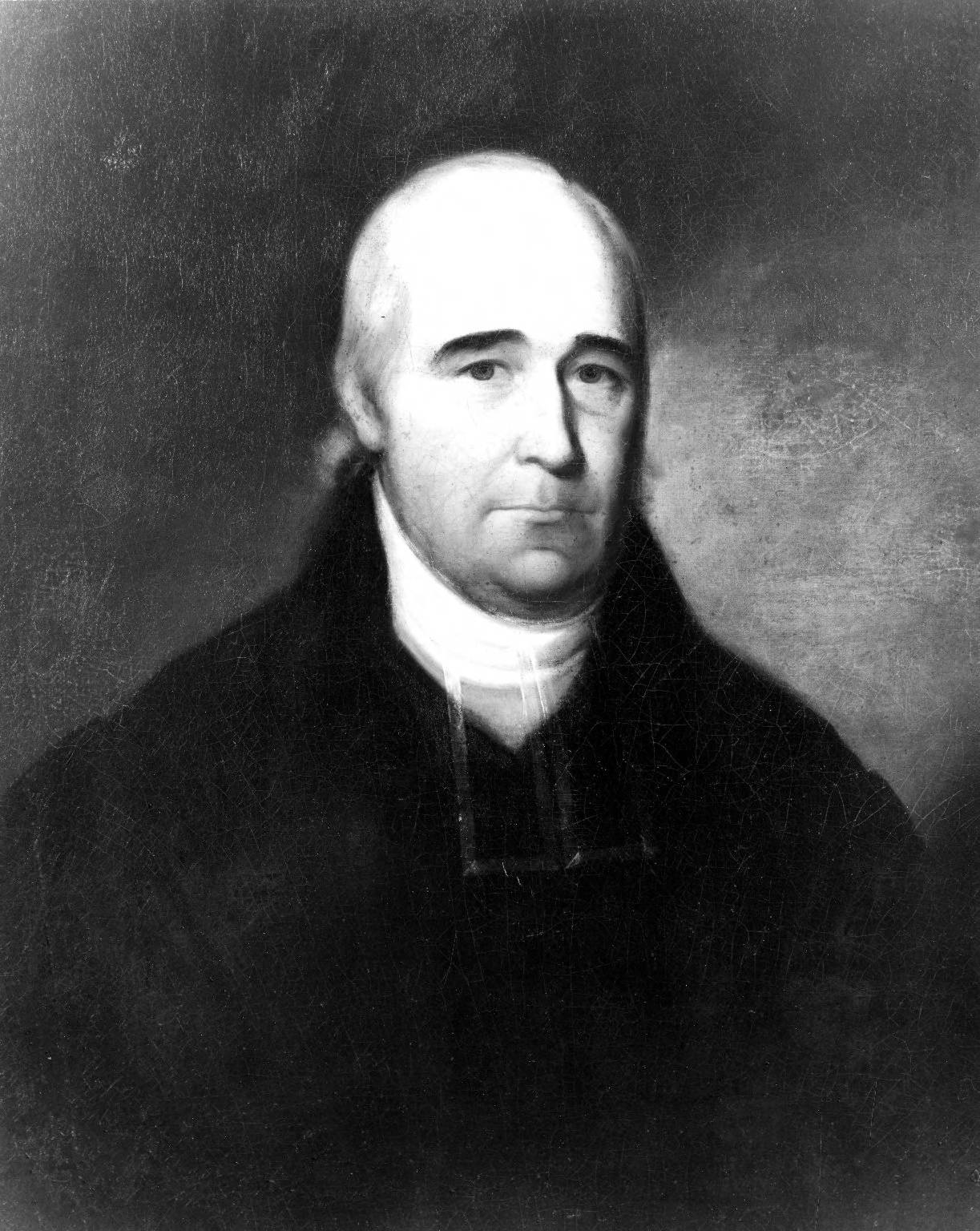
Richard Furman (1755–1825)

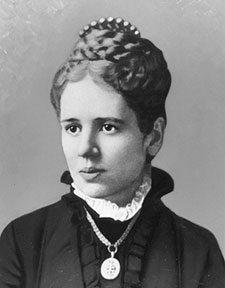
Annie Walker Armstrong, c. 1875

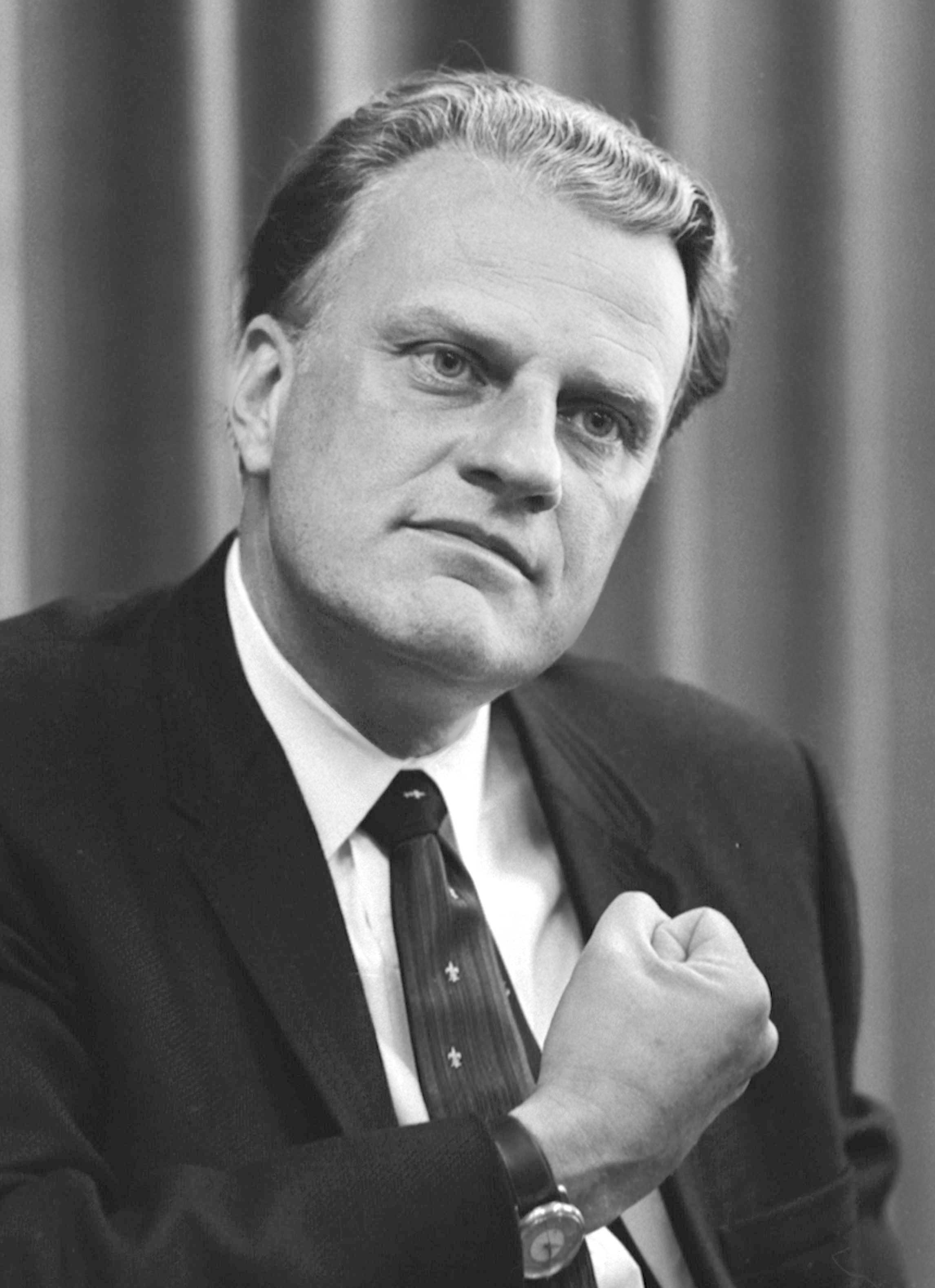
Billy Graham – preacher and educator

- Annie Armstrong (1850–1938) – instrumental in founding the Woman's Missionary Union
- George Washington Baines (1809–1882) – President of Baylor University
- Voddie Baucham (1969–2025) – pastor, author, dean of theology at African Christian University in Lusaka, Zambia (2015–2024), president of Founders Seminary
- Sion Blythe (1781–1835) – Pastor, church founder and revivalist
- James Petigru Boyce (1827–1888) – Pastor, theologian, author, and seminary professor, founding President of the Southern Baptist Theological Seminary, president of the SBC (1872–1880 and 1888–1889)
- John Albert Broadus (1827–1895) – Pastor and professor and President at the Southern Baptist Theological Seminary
- John G. Burkhalter – Highly decorated U.S. Army Chaplain who served in World War II and the Korean War.
- LaVerne Butler (1926–2010) – Pastor, college president
- Benajah Harvey Carroll (1843–1914) – Pastor, theologian, teacher, and author
- Morris Chapman (1940–2025) – SBC President (1990–1992), former executive director of the SBC Executive Committee
- Lawrence Owen Cooper Sr. (1908–1986) – President of the SBC (1972–1974)
- Grady C. Cothen (1920–2017) – State Convention Executive Secretary–Director for the SBC (1961–66), pastor, president of New Orleans Baptist Theological Seminary, president of Oklahoma Baptist University, and author.
- W. A. Criswell (1909–2002) – Pastor of First Baptist Church of Dallas, Texas, author, SBC President (1968–1970)
- Chuck Colson (1931–2012) – Founder of Prison Fellowship and author
- Russell H. Dilday (1930–2023) – President of Southwestern Baptist Theological Seminary (1978–1994), interim dean of George W. Truett Theological Seminary, and interim president of Howard Payne University
- James Philip Eagle (1837–1904) – President of the SBC (1902–1905)
- Jerry Falwell (1933–2007) – Pastor, televangelist, Liberty University founder
- Richard Fuller (1804–1876) – President of the SBC from 1859–1863
- Richard Furman (1755–1825) – First president of the Triennial Convention, President of the South Carolina State Baptist Convention
- Steve Gaines (1957–2026) – President of the SBC (2016–2018), pastor of Bellevue Baptist Church in Memphis, Tennessee
- James Bruton Gambrell (1841–1921) – President of the SBC (1917–1921)
- Billy Graham (1918–2018) – Evangelist, pastor, educator, and founder of the Billy Graham Evangelistic Association. Billy Graham preached over forty crusades. In addition, Graham established the Hour of Decision radio program, Decision Magazine, Christianity Today, and World Wide Pictures
- J. D. Grey (1906–1985) – Pastor of First Baptist Church of New Orleans, Louisiana (1937–1972) and SBC President (1952–1954)
- Mordecai Ham (1877–1961) – Radio and traveling evangelist
- Jonathan Haralson (1830–1912) – President of the SBC (1889–1899)
- Brooks Hays (1898–1981) – President of the SBC (1957–1959)
- Herschel Hobbs (1907–1995) – President of the SBC (1961–1963)
- Hosea Holcombe (1780–1841) – Historian and President of the Alabama Baptist State Convention from 1833 to 1838
- Alma Hunt – Executive secretary of the Woman's Missionary Union
- H. Dale Jackson (1930–2003) – Pastor and ethicist
- William Bullein Johnson (1782–1862) – First president of the SBC (1845–1851)
- B.R. Lakin (1901–1984) – Preacher and evangelist
- Joshua Levering (1845–1935) – President of the SBC (1908–1911)
- Homer G Lindsey (1927–2000) – Preacher at First Baptist Church in Jacksonville, FL
- Thomas Meredith (1795–1850) – Founder and editor of the Biblical Recorder newspaper
- Duke K. McCall (1914–2013) – Former president of New Orleans Baptist Theological Seminary, Southern Baptist Theological Seminary, the Baptist World Alliance, and served as general secretary of the SBC.
- Patrick Hues Mell (1814–1888) – President of the SBC (1863–1872 and 1880–1888)
- Lottie Moon (1840–1912) – Missionary to China with the Foreign Mission Board (the SBC's annual Christmas offering for international missions is named for her)
- Edgar Young Mullins (1860–1928) – Minister and educator, fourth president of the Southern Baptist Theological Seminary
- Pat Morris Neff (1871–1952) – President of the SBC (1942–1946)
- Louie De Votie Newton (1892–1986) – President of the SBC (1947–1948), President of the Georgia Baptist Convention, preacher, author, and Vice President of the Baptist World Alliance
- J. Frank Norris (1877–1952) – Preacher, left the SBC for the Independent Baptist movement, one of the most controversial figures in the history of fundamentalism
- William J. Northen (1835–1913) – President of the SBC (1899–1902)
- Paul Pressler (1930–2024) – retired Texas judge and a leader with Paige Patterson of the Southern Baptist Convention Conservative resurgence, beginning with the convention in Houston in 1979
- Nelson Price (1931–2025) – Pastor, first vice president of the SBC
- Cicero Washington Pruitt (1857–1946) – One of the first missionaries to Northern China, ordained minister at the age of fourteen, and textual translator
- James A. Ranaldson (1789–1849) – Minister, founder of the Alabama Baptist Convention, missionary, and church founder.
- Bronson Ray (1868–1934) – Southern Baptist minister who would then become the Executive Secretary of the present day International Mission Board
- Archibald Thomas Robertson (1863–1934) – Biblical scholar
- Adrian Rogers (1931–2005) – Pastor, conservative, author, and SBC President (1979–1980 and 1986–1988)
- Lee Rutland Scarborough (1870–1945) – President of the SBC (1938–1940), president of the Baptist General Convention of Texas (1929–1932), and as the president of the Southwestern Baptist Theological Seminary (1908–1942)
- J. Harold Smith (1910–2001) – Pastor and founder of Radio Bible Hour
- Frank Stagg (1911–2001) – Southern Baptist pastor, theologian, author and professor. Stagg served as a professor at both New Orleans Baptist Theological Seminary (1945–1964) and at Southern Baptist Theological Seminary (1964–1978)
- Charles F. Stanley (1932–2023) – Pastor First Baptist Church of Atlanta, Georgia, founder of In Touch Ministries, president of the SBC (1984–1986)
- Edwin William Stephens (1849–1931) – President of the SBC (1905–1908)
- John Roach Straton (1875–1929) – Pastor
- William G. Tanner (1930–2007) – Served as president of Oklahoma Baptist University from 1966 to 1970, president of the North American Mission Board, as a pastor, educator, administrator, and denominational leader
- George Washington Truett (1867–1944) – President of the SBC from 1927 to 1929, pastor of First Baptist Church in Dallas, President of the Baptist World Alliance, minister, and writer

=== Living ===
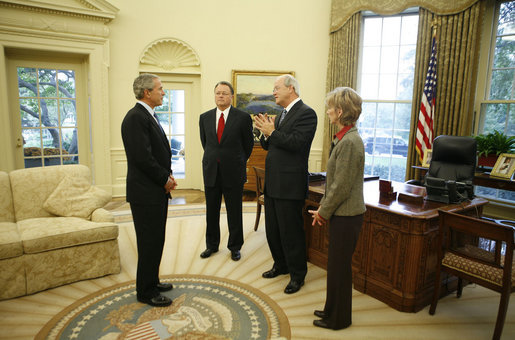
President George W. Bush meets with the leadership of the SBC in the Oval Office at the White House. Pictured with the President are Dr. Morris Chapman, left, Dr. Frank Page and his wife Dayle Page.

- Daniel L. Akin – President of Southeastern Baptist Theological Seminary (2004–2026) and author.
- Gregg R. Allison – Secretary of the Evangelical Theological Society and professor at The Southern Baptist Theological Seminary
- Thomas Ascol – President of Founders Ministries and senior pastor of Grace Baptist Church in Cape Coral, Florida
- Charles C. Baldwin, Chief of Chaplains of the U.S. Air Force 2004–2008
- Bart Barber – President of the SBC (2022–2024), senior pastor of First Baptist Church of Farmersville, Texas
- Mac Brunson – Pastor of Valleydale Baptist Church in Birmingham Alabama, Historian and Author.
- Wade Burleson – Author, historian, President of Oklahoma Baptists (2002–2004), 2022 U.S. Congressional candidate, OK–D3, and the president of Istoria Ministries, Enid, Oklahoma
- Ergun Caner – Preacher, Apologist, Author. Former president of Brewton–Parker College in Mount Vernon, Georgia. He previously served as Provost and Vice President of Academic Affairs at Arlington Baptist College and dean of Liberty Baptist Theological Seminary and Graduate School of Liberty University
- Douglas Carver – Major General who previously served as the Chief of Chaplains of the United States Army
- Dondi E. Costin – former chief of chaplains, U. S. Air Force, and current president of Liberty University
- Mark Dever – Senior pastor of the Capitol Hill Baptist Church in Washington, D.C.
- David Dockery – President of Southwestern Baptist Theological Seminary (2022–present)
- James T. Draper, Jr. – SBC president (1982–1984)
- Ronnie Floyd – President of the SBC (2014–2016), former Senior Pastor of Cross Church and The Church at Pinnacle Hills, author
- Timothy George – Southern Baptist minister, dean of Beeson Divinity School at Samford University (1989–2019), former executive director of Christianity Today, and former member of the board of directors of Lifeway Christian Resources
- Franklin Graham – Evangelist and missionary (son of Billy Graham)
- Jack Graham – President of the SBC (2002–2004); current pastor of Prestonwood Baptist Church in Plano, Texas
- J. D. Greear – President of the SBC (2018–2021), Senior Pastor of The Summit Church
- Adam W. Greenway – President of Southwestern Baptist Theological Seminary (2019–2022)
- Corey J. Hodges – African–American preacher and columnist for Salt Lake Tribune
- Paul R. House – Former professor of divinity at Beeson Divinity School and former president of the Evangelical Theological Society (2012)
- Johnny Hunt – President of the SBC (2008–2010), pastor, and author
- Jeff Iorg – President of Gateway Seminary (2004–2024)
- Robert Jeffress – Pastor of First Baptist Church (Dallas), a megachurch in Dallas, TX
- David Jeremiah – Pastor of Shadow Mountain Community Church, a megachurch in El Cajon, California
- Charles S. Kelley – President of New Orleans Baptist Theological Seminary (1996–2019)
- Richard Land – President of the Southern Evangelical Seminary in Charlotte, NC; Former president of The Ethics & Religious Liberty Commission of the SBC
- Phillip Lee, Jr. – Deputy Chief of Chaplains for Reserve Matters of the United States Navy
- Ed Litton – President of the SBC (2021–2022), senior pastor of Redemption Church in Saraland, Alabama
- Fred L. Lowery – Pastor of First Baptist Church of Bossier City, Louisiana, 1983–2013, televangelist and author
- Fred Luter – SBC President (2012–2014)
- Dwight McKissic – pastor, leader of Bapticostal movement
- James Merritt – President of the SBC (2000–2002)
- R. Albert Mohler, Jr. – President of The Southern Baptist Theological Seminary
- Russell D. Moore – Former president of the Southern Baptist Ethics & Religious Liberty Commission
- Frank Page, Former president and CEO of the SBC Executive Committee
- Paige Patterson – Eighth president of the Southwestern Baptist Theological Seminary in Fort Worth, Texas, former president of the Southeastern Baptist Theological Seminary, former president of Criswell College, president of the SBC (1998–2000), and leader of the Conservative Resurgence.
- David Platt – Former president of the International Mission Board, former senior pastor of The Church at Brook Hills in Birmingham, AL, current Lead Pastor of McLean Bible Church, and author of the New York Times Best Seller, Radical: Taking Back Your Faith from the American Dream
- Clint Pressley – President of the SBC (2024–2026), Senior Pastor of Hickory Grove Baptist Church
- Thom S. Rainer – former president and CEO of LifeWay Christian Resources in Nashville, Tennessee
- Willy Rice – President of the SBC since 2026, Senior Pastor of Calvary Church in Clearwater, Florida
- Steve Ross – former pastor of Tampa Baptist Church in Tampa, Florida, and member of the SBC Executive Committee.
- Thomas R. Schreiner – Professor at The Southern Baptist Theological Seminary, co-chairman of the Christian Standard Bible's Translation Oversight Committee, New Testament editor of the ESV Study Bible, former president of the Evangelical Theological Society.
- Ed Stetzer – Pastor, author, and dean of Talbot School of Theology at Biola University
- Jeff Struecker – Pastor, author and former U.S. Army Ranger Chaplain
- Bob Utley– Biblical scholar, author, and preparer for the SBC Sunday School Lesson Series.
- Jerry Vines – President of the SBC (1988–1990), pastor of the First Baptist Church of Jacksonville, Florida
- Bruce A. Ware – Professor of Christian theology at Southern Baptist Theological Seminary and past president of the Evangelical Theological Society (2009)
- Paul Washer (born 1961) – Evangelist and preacher, founder of the HeartCry Missionary Society
- Stephen J. Wellum – Professor of Christian theology at Southern Baptist Theological Seminary and editor of the Southern Baptist Journal of Theology
- David W. Whitlock – 15th President of Oklahoma Baptist University, Shawnee, OK
- Brad Whitt – pastor of Abilene Baptist Church in Augusta Georgia, founded in 1774
- Bryant Wright – SBC President (2010–2012)
- Homer Edwin Young – President of the SBC (1992–1994), serves as Head Pastor of Second Baptist Church Houston, is an author, and is the creator of the broadcast ministry, the Winning Walk

== Entertainers ==
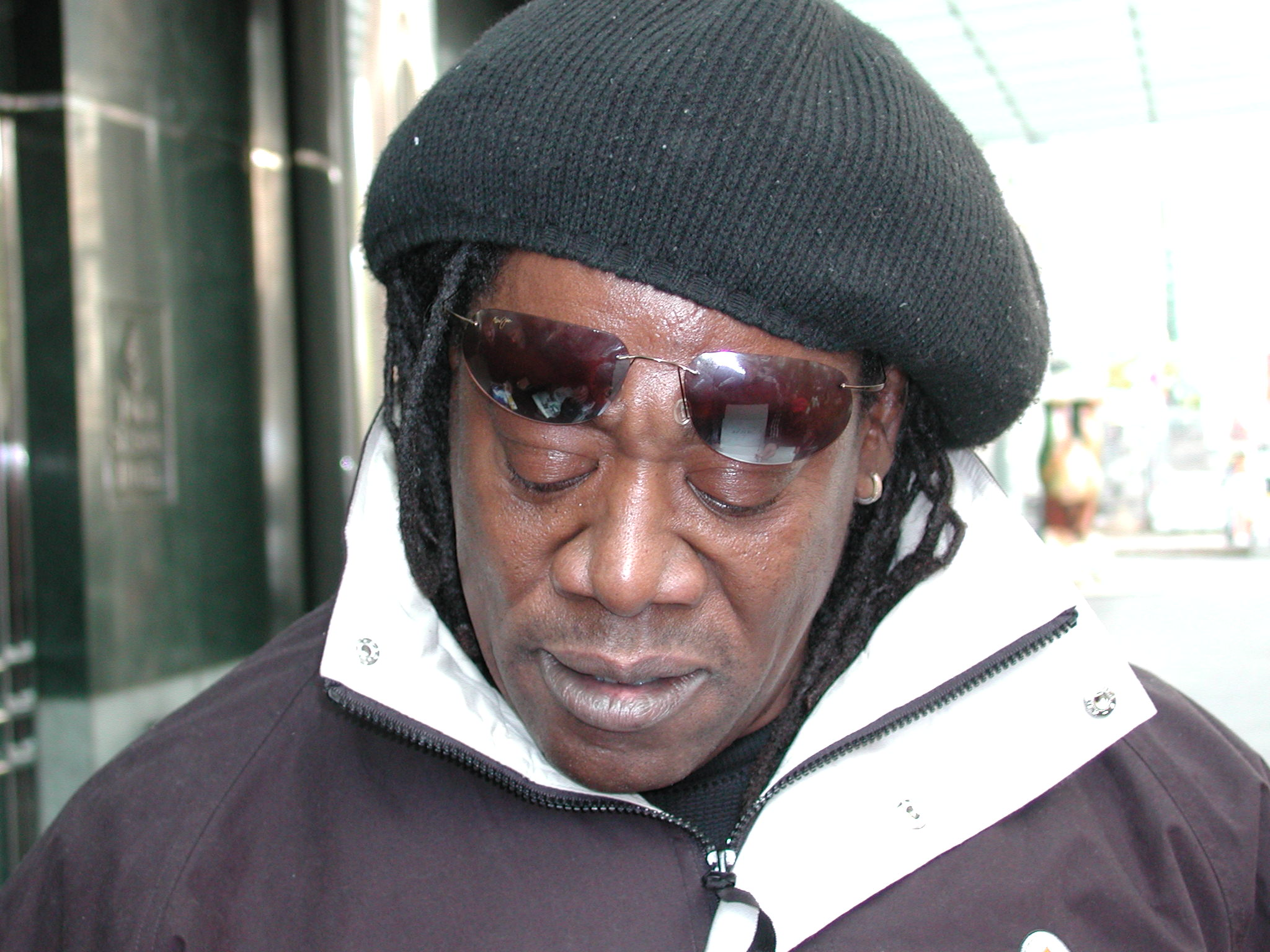
Clarence Clemons – musician and actor

=== Deceased ===
- Clarence Clemons (1942–2011) – Musician and actor
- Jerry Clower (1926–1998) – Comedian, raconteur, and member of the Grand Ole Opry
- Donald Hustad (1918–2013) – musician, composer, and organist for Campus Crusade
- Grady Nutt (1934–1982) – comedian on Hee Haw

=== Living ===
- Mark Carman – Singer, musician, composer, writer, producer
- Dakota Fanning – actress
- Elle Fanning – actress
- Bobby Sowell – musician, pianist, composer
- Deborah Voigt – opera singer

== Politicians ==
Mike Huckabee, former governor of Arkansas, and Republican candidate in the 2008 Presidential primaries

=== Deceased ===
- Tom Coburn (R–OK, 1948–2020) – Southern Baptist ordained deacon, U.S. Representative (1995–2001), and U.S. Senator (2005–2014)
- Lindsey Graham (R–SC) – U.S. Representative and Senator (1995–2026)
- Harry S. Truman (D–MO, 1884–1972) – former President of the United States, U.S. Senator from Missouri (1935–1945).
- William David Upshaw (D–GA, 1866–1952) – U.S. Representative for Georgia's 5th district (1919–1927), SBC Vice President in 1927, Evangelist and prominent defender of the KKK

=== Living ===
- Sharron Angle (R–NV) – Member of the Nevada Assembly (2003–2007); lost U.S. Senate race in 2010 to Harry Reid
- Robert J. Bentley (R–AL) – U.S. Governor of Alabama (2011–2017)
- Matt Bevin (R–KY) – Businessman and U.S. Governor of Kentucky (2015–2019)
- Matt Blunt (R–MO) – Missouri Secretary of State (2001–2005) and Governor (2005–2009)
- Roy Blunt (R–MO) - U.S. Senator (2011–2023), U.S Representative (1997–2011), Missouri Secretary of State (1985–1993), President of Southwestern Baptist University (1992–1996)
- Brad Carson (D–OK) – U.S. Representative (2001–2005)
- Travis Childers (D–MS) – U.S. Representative (2008–2011)
- Doug Collins – (R–GA) – U.S. Representative (2013–2021), Secretary of Veterans Affairs (2025–present)
- Rick Crawford (R–AR) – U.S. Representative (2011–present)
- Ted Cruz (R–TX) – U.S. Senator (2013–present)
- Greg Davis (R–MS) – State Representative (1991–1997), Mayor (1997–2013)
- Dusty Deevers (R–OK) – State Senator (2023–present), Pastor
- John Fleming (R–LA) – U.S. Representative (2009–2017), Louisiana State Treasurer (2024–present)
- Bill Flores (R–TX) – U.S. Representative (2011–2021)
- Randy Forbes (R–VA04) – U.S. Representative (2001–2017)
- Tom Graves (R–GA) – U.S. Representative (2010–present)
- Mike Huckabee – Southern Baptist Minister, governor of Arkansas, Republican candidate in the 2008 and 2016 Presidential primaries, US Ambassador to Israel (2025–present)
- Duncan L. Hunter (R–CA) – former US Congressman from San Diego County
- Mike Johnson (R–LA) – current Speaker of the House (2023–present)
- Ben Jones (D–GA) – former U.S. Representative from Georgia, also played Cooter Davenport in The Dukes of Hazzard
- Larry Kissell (D–NC) – U.S. Representative (2009–2013)
- James Lankford (R–OK) – U.S. Senator (2015–present), U.S. Representative (2011–2015), Pastor
- Kevin McCarthy (R–CA) – U.S. Representative (2007–2023) and former Speaker of the House (2023)
- Mitch McConnell (R–KY) – U.S. Senator (1985–present)
- Ronnie Musgrove (D–MS) – U.S. Lieutenant Governor (1996–2000) and Governor of Mississippi (2000–2004)
- Ron Paul (R–TX) – U.S. Representative (1976–1977, 1975–1989, 1997–2013)
- Sonny Perdue (R–GA) – Governor of Georgia (2003–2011), U.S. Secretary of Agriculture
- Scott Pruitt (R–OK) – Oklahoma Senator (1999–2007), Attorney General of Oklahoma (2011–2017), EPA Administrator (2017–2018)
- Mark Pryor – (D–AR) U.S. Senator (2003–2015)
- Chip Pickering (R–MS) – U.S. Representative (1997–2009)
- Roger Wicker (R–MS) – U.S. Senator (2007–present)
- Steve Womack (R–AR) – U.S. Representative (2011–present)
- Jason Zachary (R–TN) – State Representative (2015–present)

== Other ==
=== Deceased ===
- Truett Cathy (1921–2014) – businessman, founder of Chick-fil-A
- Shu-tian Li (1900–1988) – Chinese–American engineer and academic
- William Louis Poteat (1856–1938) – Former president of Wake Forest University

=== Living ===
- Megan Basham – reporter with The Daily Wire and author
- Zach Johnson – professional golfer
- Tim Tebow – NFL football player

== Ex-members ==
=== Deceased ===
- Jimmy Allen (1927–2019) – President of the SBC (1977–1979), pastor; became critical of the SBC's conservative resurgence and helped found the Cooperative Baptist Fellowship and the New Baptist Covenant.
- Jimmy Carter (1924–2024) – former President of the United States. During his presidential campaign, Carter introduced the term "born-again" into mainstream American politics. Carter publicly identified himself with the Cooperative Baptist Fellowship because of his differences with the conservative direction of the SBC leadership and beliefs. In 2000 he announced that he was severing all links with the SBC because of what he viewed as gender discrimination.
- Bill Moyers (1934–2025) – raised a Southern Baptist and educated at Southwestern Baptist Theological Seminary. Now a member of The Riverside Church in New York City, a dually-aligned American Baptist-United Church of Christ congregation. Press secretary to President Lyndon B. Johnson, later publisher of Newsday, and well-known journalist and TV commentator (CBS and PBS).

=== Living ===
- Alton Brown – celebrity chef and TV host.
- Ethel Cain – Singer-songwriter. Grew up in the church as the daughter of a deacon but in 2022 stated in a Tumblr post that she no longer considers herself Christian but abides by the values she was taught.
- Belinda Carlisle – singer. In an interview with Slash magazine, she described herself as a reject from a Southern Baptist household and is now a practicing Buddhist.
- Bill Clinton – former President of the United States. Raised Southern Baptist, but left the Convention due to disagreement with its conservative positions. Working with Jimmy Carter to conduct "Celebration of a New Baptist Covenant" meeting of over 30 liberal Baptist denominations and organizations in the US and Canada, which was held in Atlanta, January 30—February 1, 2008.
- Kevin Costner – actor. Baptized at First Southern Baptist Church in Bakersfield, California, as a boy.
- Al Gore – Vice President of the United States (1993–2001); Democratic presidential candidate in 2000. Gore was raised as a Southern Baptist, but like Carter and Clinton, he formally left the SBC due to his disagreements with many of the SBC's conservative positions.
- Beth Moore – author with Lifeway Christian Resources. Left the Southern Baptist church and joined the Anglican Church in North America.
- Brad Pitt – Famous television actor; raised Southern Baptist, now agnostic.
- Britney Spears – Singer, dancer, actress. She sang in a Baptist church choir as a child but later in life studied Kabbalist teachings.
- Gregory Alan Thornbury – Former president of The King's College in New York City from 2013 to 2017, professor of philosophy, dean of the School of Theology and Missions, and vice president for spiritual life at Union University in Jackson, Tennessee.
- Rick Warren – Former pastor and founder of Saddleback Church. During the 2023 SBC annual meeting, Saddleback Church was disfellowshipped from the convention for allowing the ordination of women.

== See also ==
- List of Baptists
- List of state and other conventions associated with the Southern Baptist Convention
- Southern Baptist Convention Presidents
