= Muston (surname) =

Muston is a surname. Notable people with the surname include:

- Anwen Muston, British politician
- Beau Muston (born 1987), Australian rules footballer
- Ged Muston (1927–2017), Australian Anglican bishop

== See also ==
- Maston
- Musson (surname)
