= Admiral Lee =

Admiral Lee may refer to:

- Fitzhugh Lee III (1905−1992), American vice admiral
- FitzRoy Henry Lee (1699−1750), British vice admiral
- Kent Lee (admiral) (1923−2017), American vice admiral
- Phillip Lee Jr., American chaplain and rear admiral
- Richard Lee (Royal Navy officer) (1765−1837), British admiral
- Robert C. Lee (1888−1971), rear admiral
- Samuel Phillips Lee (1812−1897), American rear admiral
- Willis Augustus Lee (1888−1945), American vice admiral
- Lee Chung-wei, Taiwanese vice admiral
- Lee Hsi-ming, Taiwanese admiral
- Lee Jye, Taiwanese admiral
- John Lee-Barber (1905−1995), British rear admiral
- Charles Vaughan-Lee (1867−1928), British rear admiral
