= Morris Chapman =

American pastor (1940–2025)

- Born: November 21, 1940; Kosciusko, Mississippi, U.S.
- Died: October 20, 2025 (aged 84); Nashville, Tennessee, U.S.
- Occupation: Pastor
- Spouse: Jodi Chapman
- Children: 2

Morris H. Chapman (November 21, 1940 – October 20, 2025) was an American Baptist pastor and writer. He was elected president and chief executive officer of the Southern Baptist Convention (SBC) executive committee in 1992 and retired in 2010.

== Early life and career ==
Chapman was born in Kosciusko, Mississippi, on November 21, 1940. He graduated from Mississippi College in Clinton, Mississippi, in 1963 and earned the Master of Divinity and Doctor of Ministry degrees from Southwestern Baptist Theological Seminary in Fort Worth, Texas, in 1968 and 1975 respectively.

He served as pastor of First Baptist Church in Rogers, Texas (1967–1969), First Baptist Church of Woodway in Waco, Texas (1969–1974), and First Baptist Church in Albuquerque, New Mexico (1974–1979), where he also served as president of the New Mexico Baptist Convention (1976–1978). He became pastor of First Baptist Church in Wichita Falls, Texas (1979–1992), and was president of the 1986 SBC Pastors' Conference in Atlanta.

== SBC executive ==
In June 1990, the theologically conservative Chapman, then still based in Wichita Falls, defeated the "moderate" Baptist choice, the Reverend Daniel Vestal of Dunwoody near Atlanta, Georgia, for the SBC presidency. The vote was 21,471 (58 percent) to 15,753 (42 percent).

Chapman was president of the SBC until 1992, when he was elected president and CEO of the SBC executive committee. His successive elections to these positions marked the start of a long period of conservative dominance of the SBC.

In February 2003, Chapman called on Southern Baptists to return to their heritage. Talking of their settled conviction of the truth of the gospels, Chapman said "Our forefathers drank from the deep, pure well named 'sound theology'."

Addressing SBC delegates at a June 2004 convention, Chapman celebrated the success of the conservative resurgence, which he attributed to support from rank-and-file Baptists.

In November 2005, Chapman defended the SBC against what he saw as harsh criticism about the church's conservative direction in former U.S. President Jimmy Carter's book, Our Endangered Values and attacked Carter's positions on subjects such as abortion and homosexuality. In January 2007, Carter and former President Bill Clinton proposed that a broadly inclusive alternative Baptist movement should be established to counter what they called a "negative image" of Baptists. Chapman disputed the contention that Baptists had a negative image, and pointed out that the SBC was by no means a "white" organization since of the 43,071 churches 4,742 said they were mainly "ethnic" and 2,085 said they were mainly African-American.

His 2009 report to the SBC noted "a resurgence in the belief that divine sovereignty alone is at work in salvation without a faith response on the part of man". This drew criticism as being unacceptable to Calvinists, and Chapman hastened to clarify that he was not denying the importance of faith but was asserting that it is a gift of God.

In September 2009 he announced that he would retire from this position effective September 30, 2010.

== Great Commission Resurgence ==
In May 2009, Chapman spoke out against the Great Commission Resurgence Declaration, specifically Article IX of the declaration which was critical of the organization of the SBC and proposed a number of changes. In September 2009, while announcing his plan to retire, Chapman said he would launch an initiative to support a "Great Commission Resurgence". The Great Commission Resurgence task force formed by SBC President Johnny Hunt, which was chaired by Ronnie Floyd, issued a report in May 2010 pressing for a revival of evangelism in the face of declining baptisms and outlining new responsibilities for Southern Baptist mission organizations. At their annual meeting in June 2010 the members of the Southern Baptist Convention overwhelming endorsed the report.

Chapman publicly opposed the report, saying "the recommendations are about moving the chairs on the deck of the Titanic while the ship goes down into an icy, watery grave". He issued a list of alternate recommendations to those given by the task force. In his final report prior to his retirement to the annual meeting of the Southern Baptist Convention in Orlando in June 2010, Chapman said the last five recommendations of the task force did not sufficiently address spiritual needs, but instead concentrated on organizational issues.

== Personal life and death ==
Chapman was married to Jodi Chapman and had two children, Chris and Stephanie. He had eight grandchildren and three great-grandchildren.

Chapman was awarded three honorary degrees: Doctor of Sacred Theology, Southwest Baptist University, Bolivar, Missouri (1985); Doctor of Divinity, Mississippi College (1992); and Doctor of Sacred Theology, Grand Canyon University, Phoenix, Arizona (2005).

Chapman died from a short illness in Nashville, Tennessee, on October 20, 2025, at the age of 84.

== Bibliography ==
- Morris Chapman (1987). Jesus: Author and Finisher. Broadman Press. ISBN 0-8054-5047-5.
- Morris Chapman (1991). The Wedding Collection: 26 Basic Wedding Ceremonies for Pastors. B&H Publishing Group. ISBN 0-8054-2004-5.
- Morris Chapman (1992). Faith: Taking God at His Word. Broadman Press. ISBN 0-8054-5354-7.

== See also ==
- List of Southern Baptist Convention affiliated people

Preceded by Jerry Vines	President of the Southern Baptist Convention; 1991–1992	Succeeded by Homer Edwin Young
