= 1906–07 Baylor Bears basketball team =

American college basketball season

1906–07 Baylor Bears men's basketball
- Conference: Independent
- Record: 5-6 (5-6 Independent)
- Head coach: Luther Burleson

The 1906-07 Baylor Bears basketball team represented the Baylor University during the 1906-07 college men's basketball season.

== Schedule ==
Date time, TV	Opponent	Result	Record	Site city, state
	Cowden Hall	W 18-11	1-0	Waco, TX
	Waco YMCA	W 43-18	2-0	Waco, TX
	Cleburne YMCA	L 20-32	2-1	Waco, TX
	Temple YMCA	L 21-26	2-2	Waco, TX
	Decatur College	L 16-33	2-3	Waco, TX
	Fort Worth U	L 12-22	2-4	Waco, TX
	Decatur College	L 10-42	2-5	Waco, TX
	at Texas	L 27-38	2-6	Austin, TX
	Texas Baptist	W 25-11	3-6	Waco, TX
	Texas	W 23-21	4-6	Waco, TX
	Texas	W 28-24	5-6	Waco, TX
*Non-conference game. (#) Tournament seedings in parentheses.
