= Herschel Hobbs =

American Southern Baptist clergyman

Herschel H. Hobbs
- Church: Southern Baptist Convention

Personal details
- Born: 1907 Talladega Springs, Alabama, United States
- Died: 1995 (aged 87–88)
- Education: Samford University • Southern Baptist Theological Seminary

Herschel H. Hobbs (1907–1995) was a Southern Baptist clergyman who served as president of the Southern Baptist Convention from 1961 to 1963. He was born in Talladega Springs, Alabama. David Dockery described him as "one of the most influential and shaping leaders in Southern Baptist life in the twentieth century". Jerry Faught held him to be "perhaps the finest denominational statesman Southern Baptists have ever known."

He chaired the committee that drafted the 1963 revision of the Baptist Faith and Message. He graduated from Howard College (later named Samford University) and then attended the Southern Baptist Theological Seminary in Louisville, Kentucky, where he earned a doctorate in 1938.

From 1949 to 1972, he served as pastor of the First Baptist Church in Oklahoma City, OK.

Hobbs was inducted into the Oklahoma Hall of Fame in 1963. He is memorialized at two places on the campus of Samford University.

== Partial list of writings of Herschel Hobbs ==
- Hobbs, Herschel H. My Faith and Message: An Autobiography. Broadman & Holman, 1993.
- Hobbs, Herschel H. "Southern Baptists and Confessionalism: A Comparison of the Origins and Contents of the 1925 and 1963." Review & Expositor 76, no. 1 (1979): 55-68.
- Hobbs, Herschel H. A Layman's Handbook of Christian Doctrine. Baptist Sunday School Board, 1974.
- Hobbs, Herschel H. "The Baptist Faith and Message-Anchored but Free." Baptist History and Heritage 13, no. 3 (1978): 34ff.
- Hobbs, Herschel H. The Origin of All Things: Studies in Genesis. Word Books, 1975.
- Hobbs, Herschel H. The Cosmic Drama: An Exposition of the Book of Revelation. Word Books, 1971.
- Hobbs, Herschel H. An Exposition of the Gospel of Mark. Baker Book House, 1970.
- Hobbs, Herschel H. "Pastoral dilemmas in baptismal practice: A symposium." Review & Expositor 65, no. 1 (1968): 69-74.
- Hobbs, Herschel H. An Exposition of the Gospel of Matthew. Baker Book House, 1965.
- Hobbs, Herschel H. What Baptists Believe. Baptist Sunday School Board, 1964.
- Hobbs, Herschel H. Fundamentals of our faith. Baptist Sunday School Board, 1960.
- Hobbs, Herschel H. "Bible Study and the Southwide Revival." Review & Expositor 36, no. 2 (1939): 187-196.
- Paschall, H. Franklin, and Herschel H. Hobbs, eds. The teacher's Bible commentary: A concise, thorough interpretation of the entire Bible designed especially for Sunday School teachers. B&H Publishing Group, 1972.

== Relevant writings about Herschel Hobbs ==
- Brown, Matthew Edward. Herschel Harold Hobbs: Southern Baptist preceptor. Southwestern Baptist Theological Seminary, doctoral dissertation, 2015.
- Dockery, David S. "The Life and Legacy of Herschel H. Hobbs (1907-1995)." Southern Baptist Journal of Theology 1 (2003): 62-78.
- Garrett Jr, James Leo. "From Denominational Statesman to Rejected Leader; From Neglected Author to Recovered Author?." Southwestern Journal of Theology 54, no. 2 (2012): 141-49.
- Hopkins Jr, Albert Peery. An analysis of the theological method of Herschel H. Hobbs and his doctrines of Christ and salvation. New Orleans Baptist Theological Seminary, 1994.
- Masona, Rodney. Preaching the Doctrine of the Holy Spirit: Discipleship Formation in the Preaching of Herschel Hobbs. Southwestern Baptist Theological Seminary, doctoral dissertation, 2016.
