= Southwestern Journal of Theology =

- Language: English
- Edited by: David S. Dockery

Publication details
- History: 1958–present
- Publisher: Southwestern Baptist Theological Seminary (United States)
- Frequency: Biannually

Standard abbreviations
- ISO 4: Southwest. J. Theol.

Indexing
- ISSN: 0038-4828
- OCLC no.: 1776710

Links
- Journal homepage

The Southwestern Journal of Theology is an academic journal published by Southwestern Baptist Theological Seminary. It was founded in 1958, and is published biannually. The current editor is David S. Dockery.
