= Texas Baptist College =

Baptist college

Coordinates: 32.6820686°N 97.3502345°W

- Motto: Christ-centered. Scripture-driven. Student-focused.
- Type: Private
- Established: 2005
- Affiliations: Southwestern Baptist Theological Seminary
- Religious affiliation: Southern Baptist
- Academic affiliations: ATS; SACS
- President: David S. Dockery
- Dean: Carl J. Bradford
- Academic staff: 15
- Location: Fort Worth, Texas, U.S.
- Campus: Suburban
- Website: texasbaptistcollege.com

Texas Baptist College is a Baptist college in Fort Worth, Texas, United States. It is affiliated with the Southwestern Baptist Theological Seminary (Southern Baptist Convention).

== History ==
The college was founded in 2005 as College at Southwestern by the Southwestern Baptist Theological Seminary.

On April 12, 2017, the college was officially renamed The L.R. Scarborough College at Southwestern Baptist Theological Seminary in honor of Lee Rutland Scarborough who served as the second seminary President of the Southwestern Baptist Theological Seminary.

In June 2021, the college was renamed from Scarborough College to Texas Baptist College.

As of 2025, David Dockery is the current and 10th president of Texas Baptist College, having served since 2022.

== Accreditation ==
The school is affiliated with the Southwestern Baptist Theological Seminary (Southern Baptist Convention).
