= BLI =

BLI may refer to:

== Biology ==
- Bio-layer interferometry, a real-time technique to study biomolecular interactions
- Bioluminescence imaging, a technology that allows for the noninvasive study of small laboratory animals

== Organizations ==
- Bible Lessons International, an American Bible study ministry
- BirdLife International, the international conservation organization working to protect the world's birds and their habitats

== Other ==
- Bellingham International Airport, a public airport northwest of Bellingham, Whatcom County, Washington
- OECD Better Life Index, an interactive tool that allows people to compare countries' performances according to their own preferences
- WBLI, an American radio station in Patchogue, New York
- BackLog Item, an item in the backlog in Scrum (software development)
