= James Bruton Gambrell =

American journalist and aducator (1841–1921)

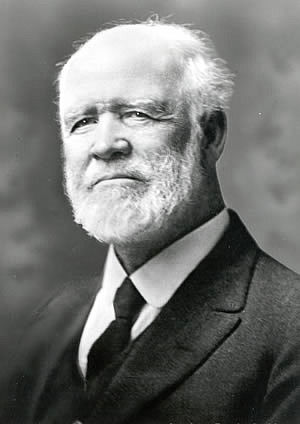
- Born: August 21, 1841; Anderson County, South Carolina, U.S.
- Died: June 10, 1921 (aged 79); Dallas, Texas, U.S.
- Resting place: Oakland Cemetery, Dallas, Texas, U.S.
- Education: University of Mississippi
- Occupations: Preacher, university president, editor
- Spouse: Mary T. Corbell
- Children: 9
- Parents: Joel Bruton Gambrel (father); Jane Williams (mother)

James Bruton Gambrell (1841–1921) was an American Confederate veteran, Southern Baptist minister, editor and university president. He served as the President of Mercer University from 1893 to 1896, and as the President of the Southern Baptist Convention from 1917 to 1920.

== Early life ==
James Burton Gambrell was born on August 21, 1841, in Anderson County, South Carolina. He grew up in Mississippi.

During the American Civil War of 1861-1865, Gambrell served in the Confederate States Army. He graduated from the University of Mississippi.

== Career ==
Gambrell became a preacher at the Oxford Baptist Church in Oxford, Mississippi. In 1877, he founded The Baptist Record, a Baptist publication, in Clinton, Mississippi. He served as the president of Mercer University, a Baptist university in Macon, Georgia, from 1893 to 1896.

Gambrell became the editor of the Baptist Standard in 1910. He was the chair of Christian Ethics and Ecclesiology at the Southwestern Baptist Theological Seminary in Fort Worth, Texas, from 1912 to 1914.

Gambrell served as the President of the Southern Baptist Convention from 1917 to 1920. During his last year, he visited Baptist churches in Europe with Edgar Young Mullins. Back in Texas, he gave talks about Christianity. For example, he was invited to speak on William B. Slaughter's ranch.

== Personal life ==
Gambrell married Mary T. Corbell on January 13, 1864. They had nine children.

== Death ==
Gambrell died on June 10, 1921, in Dallas, Texas. His funeral was held at the First Baptist Church of Dallas, and it was conducted by George Washington Truett. Gambrell was buried at the Oakland Cemetery in Dallas, Texas.

== See also ==
- List of Southern Baptist Convention affiliated people
- Southern Baptist Convention
- Southern Baptist Convention Presidents

Preceded by Lansing Burrows	President of the Southern Baptist Convention; 1917–1920	Succeeded by Edgar Young Mullins
