= William Roscoe Estep =

American Baptist historian and professor

William Roscoe Estep (February 12, 1920 – July 14, 2000) was an American Baptist historian and professor. He was an authority on the Anabaptist movement.

== Career and life ==
Estep was professor of Church history emeritus at Southwestern Baptist Theological Seminary from 1954 until his retirement in 1990, however he continued to teach until 1994. During that time, he wrote numerous works on subjects including Baptist and Anabaptist history, religious liberty and world missions. He also was involved in several church organisations including the American Society of Church History; the Conference on Faith and History (in the capacity of president); Southern Baptist Historical Society; the Texas Baptist Historical Society; and the Historical Committee of the Baptist General Convention of Texas. Estep's most significant contribution was his work on the Anabaptist movement of the 16th century and he wrote several books on the subject. His colleague James Leo Garrett, professor of theology at Southwestern Baptist Theological Seminary said that "Estep was one of the four leading American scholars on Anabaptism in the 20th century."

He was married to Edna Alice, and they had two sons, William Merl Estep and Martin Andrew Estep; daughters Rhoda Elaine Macdonald, Mary McDowell Morgan and Lena Jane Gipson. At the time of his death he had nine grandchildren. He was preceded in death by his daughter, Alice Ann Estep, and his son, Martin Andrew Estep. He died aged 80 at his home in Fort Worth, Texas, of pancreatic cancer.

== List of books published ==
- Why Baptists?: A Study of Baptist Faith and Heritage; BaptistWay Press 1997
- Renaissance and Reformation (ISBN 0-8028-0050-5), 1986
- Revolution Within the Revolution: The First Amendment in Historical Context, 1612-1789 (ISBN 0-8028-0458-6), 1990
- Whole Gospel Whole World: The Foreign Mission Board of the Southern Baptist Convention 1845–1995. 1994
- The Anabaptist Story: An Introduction to Sixteenth-Century Anabaptism (ISBN 0-8028-0886-7), 3rd edition, 1996
- Anabaptist Beginnings, 1523-1533: A Sourcebook (Bibliotheca humanistica et reformatorica) (ISBN 90-6004-337-5), 1976
