= Walter Thomas Conner =

American Baptist theologian (1877–1952)

Walter Thomas Conner (January 19, 1877 in Cleveland County, Arkansas—1952) was a prominent Baptist theologian and educator on the faculty of the Southwestern Baptist Theological Seminary at Fort Worth, Texas, from 1910 to 1949.

He was educated at Baylor University and was a member of the first graduating class of Southwestern Baptist Seminary in 1908 with a Th.B. degree; he also studied at Rochester Seminary (with A. H. Strong and Walter Rauschenbusch).

He based his theological systems on those of his teachers, Benajah Harvey Carroll of Baylor University, Augustus Hopkins Strong at Rochester Theological Seminary, and Edgar Young Mullins, of Louisville. Conner was also influenced by personalism, His theology stressed the moral self consistency of the divine attributes. His writings emphasized the idea of "Christus victor" ("Victorious Christ"). Conner was a moderate Calvinist, but said little about the issue of biblical inspiration. He shifted away from "postmillennialism" to amillennialism. Conner in 1945 depicted "evangelistic and missionary activity" as a sharing of the cross of Christ and treated the bringing of "others to know and serve Christ" as an aspect of "the Christian's mission and work."

== Selected bibliography ==
- The Resurrection of Jesus (1926, Sunday School Board of the Southern Baptist Convention)
- Revelation and God: An Introduction to Christian Doctrine (1936 - Broadman Press)
- Christian Doctrine (1937, Broadman Press, reprinted 1998)
- The Christ We Need (1938, Zondervan Publishing)
- The Faith of the New Testament (1940 - Broadman Press)
- The Gospel of Redemption (1945 - Broadman Press)
- The Work of the Holy Spirit (1949, Broadman Press)
- The Cross in the New Testament Introduction By Jesse J. Northcutt (1954, Broadman Press)
