= Maston =

Maston is both a surname and a given name. Notable people with the name include:

Surname:

- Carl Maston (1915–1992), American architect
- June Maston (1928–2004), Australian sprinter
- Le'Shai Maston (born 1970), American football player
- Mercy Maston (born 1992), Canadian football player
- T. B. Maston (1897–1988), American writer

Given name:

- Maston E. O'Neal, Jr. (1907–1990), American politician
- Maston Williams (1879–1978), American actor

== See also ==
- Maston House, historic house in Seaford, Sussex County, Delaware, United States
