= Edgar Young Mullins =

American pastor (1860–1928)

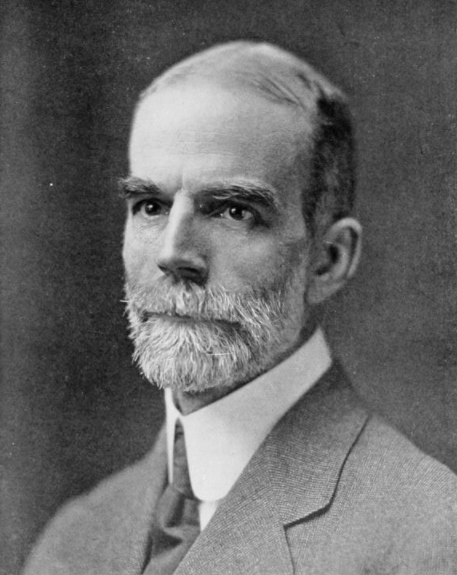
- Born: January 5, 1860; Franklin County, Mississippi
- Died: November 23, 1928 (aged 68); Louisville, Kentucky
- Education: Texas A&M University; Southern Baptist Theological Seminary
- Occupation: Clergyman

Edgar Young Mullins (January 5, 1860 – November 23, 1928) was a Southern Baptist minister and educator, who from 1899 until his death was the fourth president of the Southern Baptist Theological Seminary, the flagship school of the Southern Baptist Convention.

== Biography ==
Edgar Young Mullins was born in Franklin County, Mississippi on January 5, 1860. He entered Texas A&M College at 16, and after graduation studied to become a lawyer, but a dramatic religious experience under the preaching of Major William Evander Penn caused him to pursue a career in foreign missions. He entered the Southern Baptist Theological Seminary, graduating in 1885 as one of the top students in his class. He married Isla May Hawley, whom he met at Walnut Street Baptist Church in Louisville. They were parents of two sons, both of whom died in early childhood.

The Southern Baptist Foreign Mission Board, short on funds, turned down his application to become a missionary to Brazil. Years later, Mullins would become Associate Secretary of the Foreign Mission Board. Mullins also served in pastoral ministry in Baltimore, Maryland.

Following his time in Baltimore, Mullins settled into pastoral work in New England, far from his alma mater, which was embroiled in a bitter theological controversy with its third president, William Heth Whitsitt. When Southern Seminary sent an agent to his doorstep in Newton Centre, Massachusetts, to offer him its presidency, Mullins expressed initial shock at the thought of stepping into that difficult post. The unanimous call of the trustees persuaded him, however, and he assumed the presidency in 1899.

Toward the end of his seminary presidency, Mullins led in the relocation of the 1877-era campus from downtown Louisville to a spacious suburban tract known as "the Beeches" in the hills east of the city. In 1926 a handsome academic and residential complex was completed in classical Georgian architecture, with a distinctive clock tower in his honor atop the main administrative building, Norton Hall. The main housing complex on the new campus was named Mullins Hall also in honor of his leadership.

In addition to serving as president, Mullins taught theology at the seminary. Out of his classroom experiences a pivotal textbook, The Christian Religion in Its Doctrinal Expression, was published in 1917, in addition to nine other books—notably, The Axioms of Religion, Why is Christianity True?, and Christianity at the Crossroads.

Through his books, sermons and denominational articles, Mullins became one of the most influential Baptists of the twentieth century. His influence extended to all spheres of Southern Baptist life. From 1921 to 1924 Mullins served as the elected president of the Southern Baptist Convention as it wrestled with significant issues including the teaching of evolution. Mullins helped prevent a split in the denomination through the development of a consensus doctrinal statement called The Baptist Faith and Message, adopted in 1925, which has been updated several times as the convention has turned steadily more conservative in recent years.

Shortly before his death, Mullins was named president of the Baptist World Alliance, in recognition of his important role in international Baptist life.

He died at his home in Louisville on November 23, 1928, two weeks after suffering a paralyzing stroke.

43 boxes of his correspondence and notebooks are held at the Southern Baptist Theological Seminary.

== Works ==
- Why Is Christianity True? Christian Evidences, 1905
- The Axioms of Religion, 1908
- Baptist Beliefs. Louisville, KY: Baptist World Publishing Company. 1913 [1912].
- Freedom and Authority in Religion, 1913
- Commentary on Ephesians and Colossians, 1913
- The Life in Christ, 1917
- The Christian Religion in Its Doctrinal Expression. Roger Williams Press. 1917.
- Talks on Soul Winning, 1920
- Spiritualism, A Delusion, 1920
- Christianity at the Crossroads, 1924

== Prominent students ==
- Walter Thomas Conner

== See also ==
- List of Southern Baptist Convention affiliated people
- Southern Baptist Convention
- Southern Baptist Convention Presidents

Preceded by James Bruton Gambrell	President of the Southern Baptist Convention; 1921-1923	Succeeded by George W. McDaniel
