= Adam W. Greenway =

American theologian and religious leader

9th President of Southwestern Baptist Theological Seminary
- In office February 27, 2019 – September 23, 2022
- Vice President: Randy Stinson (until 2020) David S. Dockery
- Preceded by: L. Paige Patterson
- Succeeded by: David Dockery

Personal details
- Born: 1978 (age 47–48)
- Spouse: Carla Greenway
- Children: Wade (son) and Caroline (daughter)
- Education: Samford University (BA); Southwestern Baptist Theological Seminary (M.Div.); University of Notre Dame (MA); Southern Baptist Theological Seminary (Ph.D.)
- Occupation: Former Seminary President; Pastor

Adam Wade Greenway is an American pastor, theologian and religious leader. He served as the 9th president of Southwestern Baptist Theological Seminary (SWBTS) in Fort Worth, Texas from 2019 to 2022. He was the youngest president in the history of the seminary, being installed at 41 years old. Simultaneous with his role as president, he served as a Professor of Evangelism and Apologetics. A report released by the school in June 2023 concluded that Greenway misspent seminary funds during his tenure.

Prior to his SWBTS presidency, Greenway served as Dean of the Billy Graham School of Missions, Evangelism and Ministry at The Southern Baptist Theological Seminary, where he also held the title of William Walker Brookes Associate Professor of Evangelism and Apologetics. He was the senior pastor of The Baptist Church at Andover in Lexington, Kentucky for five years. Additionally, he has served as interim pastor of churches in Kentucky, Illinois, Indiana, Ohio, Texas, and Florida.

== Education and career ==
Previously, Greenway served as the Dean of the Billy Graham School of Missions, Evangelism, and Ministry at Southern Baptist Theological Seminary in Louisville, Kentucky. He also served as the William Walker Brookes Associate Professor of Evangelism and Apologetics at SBTS.

Greenway received his Bachelor of Arts degree (cum laude) from Samford University; the Master of Divinity degree from Southwestern Baptist Theological Seminary; the Master of Nonprofit Administration degree (magna cum laude) from the University of Notre Dame; and the Doctor of Philosophy degree from Southern Baptist Theological Seminary. Prior to joining the Southern Seminary faculty, he served for five years as senior pastor of The Baptist Church at Andover in Lexington, Kentucky. He has also served as interim pastor of churches in five states.

Greenway currently serves as Chairman of the Committee on Order of Business of the Southern Baptist Convention, and is a former trustee and Chairman of the Board of Trustees of LifeWay Christian Resources. He also served as a past-president of the Kentucky Baptist Convention. In 2018 Greenway served as the assistant chairman of the Evangelism Task Force appointed by former Southern Baptist Convention president, Steve Gaines. On September 23, 2022, Greenway announced his resignation as president of Southwestern Seminary and taking a position with the International Mission Board, though subsequently deciding not to assume that position. David Dockery succeeded him as interim president of Southwestern.

A member of the Evangelical Theological Society and the Evangelical Philosophical Society, and a past president of the Southern Baptist Professors of Evangelism Fellowship, he is co-editor of Evangelicals Engaging Emergent and The Great Commission Resurgence, and has contributed articles to various books and journals.

In June 2023, SWBTS released a report alleging that Greenway misspent seminary funds during his tenure, including the purchase of an $11,000 espresso machine.
