= Beeson Divinity School =

Coordinates: 33.4642499°N 86.79351°W

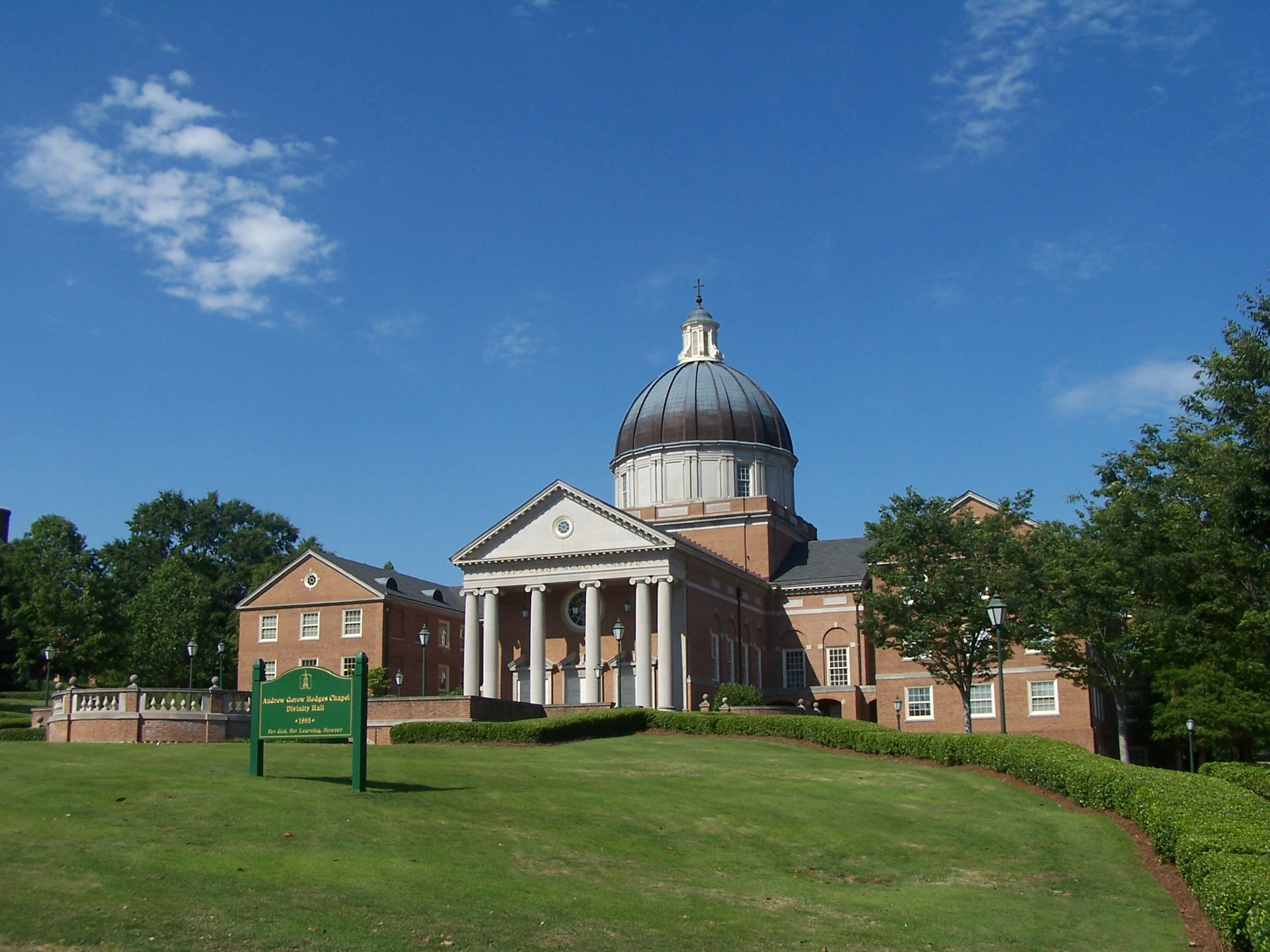
Beeson Divinity School

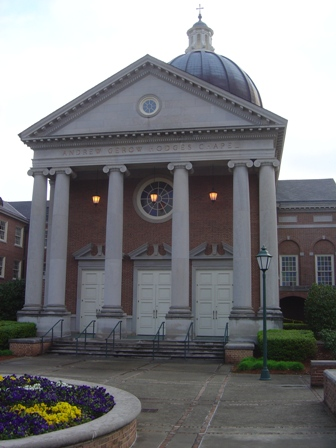
The Andrew Gerow Hodges Chapel of the Beeson Divinity School

Beeson Divinity School at Samford University is an in-person, interdenominational, evangelical divinity school located in Birmingham, Alabama, United States. The current dean is Douglas A. Sweeney.

The school offers several degrees Master of Divinity, Master of Arts in Christian Counseling, Master of Arts in Theological Studies, a Master of Theology (ThM) and the Doctor of Philosophy in Theology for the Church (PhD). It houses an Institute of Anglican Studies, the Robert Smith Jr. Preaching Institute, the Global Center and a Center for Women in Ministry. In 2013, it began offering a Certificate of Anglican Studies and in 2021, a Certificate of Wesleyan Studies. Beeson also offers a Missions Certificate. In 2026, the school began offering a concentration in apologetics for MDiv and MATS students.

== Founding ==
Beeson Divinity was established on February 9, 1988. It is named for Ralph Waldo Beeson (1900–1990), who gave one of the largest donations (70 Million USD) in Samford history to create the first divinity school at a Baptist college in the US, and for his father, John Wesley Beeson. Ralph Beeson wanted the donation to remain anonymous, but relented to the naming of the school after his father at the suggestion of Samford's board of trustees.

== Andrew Gerow Hodges Chapel ==
The focal point of the divinity school is Andrew Gerow Hodges Chapel, dedicated in 1995 and named in honor of Andrew Gerow Hodges in 2002. Though an original design by Neil Davis of Davis Architects, it was inspired by Il Redentore in Venice designed by Andrea Palladio. The interior features three cycles of iconography. In the dome are sixteen prominent figures from Christian history representing a variety of theological traditions. It was inspired by a passage in chapter 12 of Hebrews. in the transept apses are ten painting depicting days or seasons of the Christian year, beginning with Advent and ending with Reformation Day. Both of these cycles were painted by the Romanian artist Petru Botezatu. The third cycle are six busts in cultured marble of 20th-century Christian martyrs from each of the six inhabited continents. These were made by Martin Dawes of Cherrylion Studios. These are in the crossing and aisles.

== Deans ==
1. Timothy George, 1989–2019
2. Douglas A. Sweeney, 2019–present

== Notable faculty ==
- Gerald Bray, historical theology
- Timothy George, historical theology, founding dean
- Paul R. House (retired), Old Testament, Hebrew
- Robert Smith Jr. (retired), preaching
- Timothy Tennent (January 2025), Methodist Chair of Divinity, former president of Asbury Theological Seminary
- Frank Thielman, New Testament studies, Presbyterian Chair

== Conferences ==
In the early twenty-first century, Beeson has hosted a number of theology conferences, including "The Will to Believe and the Need for Creed" (2009), "J.I. Packer and the Evangelical Future" (2006), and "God The Holy Trinity" (2004). Lectures from these conferences were published by Baker Academic Publishing as the Beeson Divinity Studies series. Beeson hosts three annual lectures: the Reformation Heritage Lectures, the Conger Biblical Preaching Lectures and the Biblical Studies Lectures. In 2024, the school hosted its inaugural preaching conference in honor of retiring preaching professor Robert Smith Jr., for whom the school's preaching institute is named. Beeson also hosts an annual Reformation Anglicanism Lecture.
