= Timothy George =

American theologian

- Born: January 9, 1950 (age 76)
- Occupation: Distinguished Professor of Divinity at Beeson Divinity School of Samford University

Academic background
- Education: University of Tennessee at Chattanooga (A.B.); Harvard Divinity School (M.Div.); Harvard University (Th.D.)

Academic work
- Institutions: Beeson Divinity School of Samford University
- Main interests: Church History

Timothy George (born 9 January 1950) is an American theologian and journalist. He became the founding dean of Beeson Divinity School at the school's inception in 1988 and was the dean from 1989 to 2019, now serving as research professor of divinity. George teaches church history and doctrine and serves as executive editor for Christianity Today. He is on the editorial advisory boards of the Harvard Theological Review, Christian History, and Books & Culture. He also serves as a fellow for The Center for Baptist Renewal.

== Career ==
George has served on the Board of Directors of Lifeway Christian Resources of the Southern Baptist Convention. He has written more than 20 books and regularly contributes to scholarly journals. His book Theology of the Reformers has been translated into several languages and is used as a textbook in many schools and seminaries.

His most recent books are Is the Father of Jesus the God of Muhammad? and The Mark of Jesus: Loving in a Way the World Can See (with John D. Woodbridge). He edited J.I. Packer and the Evangelical Future (Baker 2009) and co-edited the book Our Sufficiency is of God: Essays on Preaching in Honor of Gardner C. Taylor (March 2010).

George is active in evangelical–Roman Catholic Church dialogue. He co-authored the Manhattan Declaration: A Call of Christian Conscience with Roman Catholic legal scholar Robert P. George.

He is also an ordained minister in the Southern Baptist Convention and has been pastor of churches in Georgia, Massachusetts, Kentucky and Alabama.

A Festschrift was composed in his honor titled Worship, Tradition, and Engagement: Essays in Honor of Timothy George. Contributors included David S. Dockery, Gerald Bray, Mark Dever, Kevin J. Vanhoozer, John D. Woodbridge, Albert Mohler, and Richard Mouw.

== Public lectures ==
In 2005, George delivered the nineteenth Erasmus Lecture titled Evangelicals and Others, organized by First Things magazine and the Institute on Religion and Public Life. In his lecture, George explored the place of evangelical Christianity within the wider Christian tradition, emphasizing the need for constructive dialogue and cooperation between evangelicals, Catholics, and Orthodox believers. He argued that shared commitments to Scripture, faith, and moral renewal can help bridge confessional divides and strengthen the public witness of Christianity in the modern world.

== Personal life ==
He and his wife, Denise, have two adult children.

Education

- A.B., University of Tennessee at Chattanooga
- M.Div., Harvard Divinity School
- Th.D., Harvard University

== Published works ==
=== Articles ===
Some of his articles are available online:

- How Old Are the Baptists?
- John Calvin: Comeback Kid
- We Travel Together Still: A Tribute to Father Richard John Neuhaus
- Lincoln's Faith and America's Future
- Rick 'n Jesus
- Bend It Like Beckwith?
- The Jerry I Remember
- Love in the Ruins: St. Augustine on 9/11
- Southern Baptists after the Revolution
- Delighted by Doctrine (A Tribute to Jaroslav Pelikan)
- The Word Became Flesh
- Is Jesus a Baptist?
- Where Are They Now? A Monthly Update on Beeson Alumni

=== Books ===
- Theology of the Reformers (Broadman Press, 1988)
- " Faithful Witness: The Life and Mission of William Carey" (New Hope, 1991)
- Amazing Grace: God's Pursuit, Our Response (Crossway, 2000)
- Galatians: The Christian Standard Commentary (B&H Publishing Group, 2020)
