= William G. Tanner =

William G. Tanner (10 March 1930 – 10 June 2007) was a Southern Baptist pastor, educator, administrator, and denominational leader.

He was married to Ellen Yates Tanner. They had four children: William Tanner Jr., Keith Tanner, Mark Kyle Tanner, and Kimberley Tanner Canova.

== Education ==
- Bryan High School, Bryan, Texas, 1947
- English and Religion, Baylor University, 1951
- Master's of Administration, University of Houston, 1953
- Doctorate in Administration and Guidance, University of Houston, 1956.
- Bachelor of Divinity, Southwestern Baptist Theological Seminary, 1958
- Doctor of Theology, Southwestern Baptist Theological Seminary, 1967

== OBU President ==
During Tanner's presidency, Oklahoma Baptist University's enrollment grew from less than 1,600 to a university record of 1,818 in 1975. The university's budget grew from $3.6 million to $5.2 million. He also oversaw the Mabee Learning Center capital project garner $1.8 million in gifts and contributions. He resigned as president of OBU to become president of the Home Mission Board of the Southern Baptist Convention (now the North American Mission Board).
