= T. B. Maston =

Thomas Buford Maston
- Born: November 26, 1897; Jefferson County, Tennessee, United States
- Died: May 1, 1988 (aged 90); Fort Worth, Texas, United States
- Occupation(s): ethicist, professor
- Spouse(s): Essie Mae Maston (née McDonald) (June 11, 1921)
- Children: Thomas McDonald Maston(1925), Harold Eugene Maston (1928)

Thomas Buford Maston was a Christian ethicist and writer.

He is the namesake of the T. B. Maston Foundation, which was begun by several former students who received their doctorates in Christian Ethics under Dr. Maston, including A. Jase Jones, Bill Pinson, Jimmy Allen, James Dunn, and Foy Valentine.

== Biography ==
Born of humble beginnings in Jefferson County, Tennessee, he also spent his childhood in College Corner, Ohio, and Fountain City, Tennessee.

In 1916 he enrolled in Carson-Newman College.

In 1920, he married Essie Mae McDonald, and enrolled in Southwestern Baptist Theological Seminary, in Fort Worth, Texas where he earned a Master of Religious Education. He later earned the first Doctor of Religious Education degree from Southwestern in 1925, then an M.A. from Texas Christian University in 1927.

In 1932 he entered Yale University where he majored in Christian ethics under Richard Niebuhr, and received a Ph.D. in 1939. He returned to Southwestern seminary where he developed a graduate Doctor of Theology degree in Christian Ethics.

Through his efforts and example, Christian ethics became a field of study in every Baptist seminary, Christian Life Commissions became common nationally, and race relations, sensitivity to the poor, and women's rights in the Southern Baptist Convention improved as a result.

Maston wrote twenty-seven books on ethics. He was licensed to preach but was never ordained. He was a layman and deacon at Gambrell Street Baptist Church in Fort Worth.

== Works ==
- Biblical ethics: a guide to the ethical message of the Scriptures from Genesis through Revelation (ISBN 0865543127)
- Christianity and world issues
- Right or Wrong (ISBN 0805461167)
