= John Lee-Barber =

British Royal Navy officer (1905–1995)

Rear-Admiral John Lee-Barber CB DSO
- Born: 16 April 1905
- Died: 14 November 1995 (aged 90); Wivenhoe, Essex
- Spouse: Suzanne Le Gallais (1939–1976)
- Military career
- Allegiance: United Kingdom
- Branch: Royal Navy
- Service years: 1919–1959
- Rank: Rear-Admiral
- Nickname: Johnny
- Commands: HMS Griffin (1941); HMS Opportune (1942); Inshore Flotilla (1954)
- Conflicts: Second World War
- Awards: Distinguished Service Order & Bar; Cross of Valour (Poland); Mentioned in Despatches; Companion of the Order of the Bath

Rear-Admiral John Lee-Barber, CB, DSO (16 April 1905 – 14 November 1995) was a British Royal Navy officer who is possibly best known for having served on board HMS Griffin during the Norwegian Campaign of April–May 1940.

== Pre-war service ==
Lee-Barber joined the Royal Navy in 1919 and served in the Far East on a gunboat on the Yangtse river.

== Second World War ==
At the beginning of the Second World War, ships of Griffin's type were ill-equipped to deal with air attack. This is borne out by HMS Griffin being the only survivor of a flotilla of nine ships.

=== 1940 ===
In February 1940, he had to have an operation on his stomach in February 1940. Lee-Barber was allowed back to his duties on a condition of living a teetotal lifestyle. He attributed his long life to his abstinence from alcohol that he began then.

Lee-Barber was mentioned in despatches for his work in landing and subsequently evacuating troops from Namsos in northern Norway. The bridge crew of HMS Griffin became adept at dodging attacks by Luftwaffe Stuka dive bombers during the campaign. Later, when based at Dover and protecting convoys, Griffin avoided 36 air attacks by Dornier Do 17 aircraft.

The island of Texel off the coast of the Netherlands and the French coastline were the next area of conflict for Griffin. They were acting in support of the Allied armies facing the German invasion of France and the Low Countries. The ship missed the Dunkirk evacuation due to undergoing a refit at Devonport. However, the ship did lift Polish troops from the French port of St Nazaire, an act which earned Lee-Barber the Polish Cross of Valour.

HMS Griffin was then despatched to join Force H at Gibraltar. In this theatre Lee-Barber participated in the Battle of Cape Matapan and the Malta convoys. His actions in at this time earned him the first award of the Distinguished Service Order (DSO) in July 1940.

=== 1941 ===
Lee-Barber was promoted to Commander in June 1941 and participated in the Greece Campaign. He participated in the evacuation of British troops from both Greece and the Crete, which his skill and persistence earning a second DSO. HMS Griffin also received a message of congratulations from commander of the Mediterranean Fleet, Admiral Andrew Cunningham. Griffin went on to bombard Vichy French positions at Haifa and Sidon. The ship also acted in support of the garrison during the Siege of Tobruk. Lee-Barber would take supplies in to the troops, running the gauntlet of U-boats and having to unload all supplies in 40 minutes. This timeframe allowed the ship to get back under the protective Royal Air Force (RAF) air umbrella by dawn. After this busy service Lee-Barber was posted to a land based job in army liaison in the Home Counties in late 1941.

=== 1942–44 ===
After serving in the UK Lee-Barber was given another sea command with HMS Opportune. He was with the ship when it took part in the Battle of the North Cape which resulted the sinking of the German battleship Scharnhorst. Lee-Barber was mentioned in despatches for a second time for his actions during the battle.

== Post War service ==
After the end of the war Lee-Barber's service continued in destroyers, culminating in command of the 4th Destroyer Squadron.

Promoted to Captain he was posted as British Naval Attaché in Chile, travelling to Santiago in 1950. The Chilean Minister of National Defence was effusive in his praise for Lee-Barber.

In 1954 Lee-Barber was promoted to Commodore and place in command of the Inshore Flotilla at Harwich. His command comprised minesweepers and fishery protection vessels under the command of younger officers.

His final posting was as Admiral Superintendent, commanding the dockyard at Malta. It was at this time Lee-Barber sustained a broken leg during a riot by the dock workers.

Upon retiring in 1959 Lee-Barber was appointed to the Order of the Bath (CB). He continued sailing in his retirement, living in Suffolk before moving to Wivenhoe in Essex. His 90th birthday was marked there by a sail-past by his friends.

== Personal life ==
Lee-Barber married Suzanne Le Gallais of St. Hellier on Jersey in 1939 and they had two daughters together. Suzanne died in 1976.

== Naval career ==
- 1940 Rank: Lieutenant-Commander. Ship: HMS Griffin. Companion of the Distinguished Service Order. Mentioned in Despatches
- 1941 Rank: Lieutenant commander. Bar to the Distinguished Service Order.
- 1941 Rank: Commander.
- 1944 Rank: Commander. Mentioned in Despatches.
- 1948 Rank: Captain.
- 1954 Rank: Commodore

== Honours ==
- 1959 Companion of the Order of the Bath
