= Paul R. House =

American biblical scholar

- Born: 1958 (age 67–68)
- Occupations: Old Testament scholar, author, and seminary professor

Academic background
- Education: Southwest Baptist University, University of Missouri
- Alma mater: Southern Baptist Theological Seminary (PhD)

Academic work
- Institutions: Taylor University; Southern Baptist Theological Seminary; Wheaton College; Beeson Divinity School

Paul R. House (born 1958) is an American Old Testament scholar, author, and seminary professor who served as president of the Evangelical Theological Society in 2012. He was a professor of divinity at Beeson Divinity School, an interdenominational seminary in Birmingham, Alabama, until his retirement in May 2023.

== Biography ==
He earned his B.A. from Southwest Baptist University, his M.A. from the University of Missouri, and his M.Div. and Ph.D. from the Southern Baptist Theological Seminary.

House taught at Taylor University for ten years before joining the faculty at The Southern Baptist Theological Seminary in 1996, where he was appointed by Albert Mohler as the first editor of The Southern Baptist Journal of Theology. From 1999 until 2001, he taught at Trinity Episcopal School for Ministry and was a member of the Translation Oversight Committee for the English Standard Version of the Bible. From 2001 until 2004, House was professor of Old Testament at Wheaton College. In 2004, House joined the faculty at Beeson Divinity School, where he served as Professor of Divinity, teaching Old Testament theology and Hebrew, until retiring in 2023. In 2012, House served as the President of the Evangelical Theological Society.

== Personal life ==
House is married to Heather, a professional theological editor. His daughter, Molly, also pursued a bachelor's degree of Biblical studies and completed a master in New Testament at Oxford University.

== Works ==
- House, Paul R. (1988). Zephaniah: A Prophetic Drama. Journal for the Study of the Old Testament, Supplement Series. Vol. 69. Decatur, GA: Almond Press. ISBN 0567599264.
- ——— (1995). 1, 2 Kings. New American Commentary. Vol. 8. Nashville, TN: B&H Academic. ISBN 0805401083.
- ——— (1990). The Unity of the Twelve. Library of Hebrew Bible/Old Testament Studies. Sheffield: Sheffield Academic Press. ISBN 0567120759.
- ——— (1998). Old Testament Theology. Downers Grove, IL: Inter-Varsity Press. ISBN 0830815236.
- ———; Thornbury, Greg A. (2000). Who Will Be Saved?: Defending the Biblical Understanding of God, Salvation, & Evangelism. Wheaton, IL: Crossway Books. ISBN 1581341431.
- ——— (2004). Lamentations. Word Biblical Commentary. Vol. 23b. Nashville, TN: Thomas Nelson. ISBN 0849908256.
- ———; Hafemann, Scott J., eds. (2007). Central Themes in Biblical Theology: mapping unity in diversity. Grand Rapids, MI: Baker Academic. ISBN 978-0801034237.
- House, Paul R. (2015). Bonhoeffer's Seminary Vision: A Case for Costly Discipleship and Life Together. Wheaton, IL: Crossway. ISBN 978-1433545443.
- Wilson, Todd A.; House, Paul R., eds. (2017). The Crucified Apostle: Essays on Peter and Paul. Tübingen: Mohr Siebeck. ISBN 978-316155610-4.
- House, Paul R. (2018). Daniel: An Introduction and Commentary (Tyndale Old Testament Commentaries). Downers Grove, IL: IVP Academic. ISBN 978-0830842735.
- House, Paul R. (2019). Isaiah 1-27 Vol 1: A Mentor Commentary. Fearn, Scotland: Christian Focus Publishing. ISBN 978-1527102309.
- House, Paul R. (2019). Isaiah 28-66 Vol 2: A Mentor Commentary. Fearn, Scotland: Christian Focus Publishing. ISBN 978-1527102316.
