= Lee Rutland Scarborough =

American pastor and academic (1870–1945)

2nd President of Southwestern Baptist Theological Seminary
- In office 1915–1942
- Preceded by: Benajah Harvey Carroll
- Succeeded by: E.D. Head

Personal details
- Born: July 4, 1870 Colfax, Louisiana
- Died: April 10, 1945 (aged 74) Amarillo, Texas
- Parent(s): George and Martha Scarborough
- Education: Baylor University, Yale University, Southern Baptist Theological Seminary
- Occupation: Seminary President

Lee Rutland Scarborough (1870–1945) was an American Southern Baptist pastor, evangelist, denominational leader, and professor at the Southwestern Baptist Theological Seminary (SWBTS). He spent the first 16 years of his life on a ranch and became an adept cowboy. He attended later Baylor University, Yale University and The Southern Baptist Theological Seminary. He accepted the invitation of B. H. Carroll in 1908 to occupy the world's first academic chair of evangelism, "The Chair of Fire," at SWBTS, (also known as the L. R. Scarborough Chair of Evangelism) and chaired the seminary's department of evangelism. In February 1915, following the death of B. H. Carroll, he became president of Southwestern Baptist Theological Seminary. He remained in both positions until 1942, during which time he also served a term as president of the Baptist General Convention of Texas (1929–32) and a term as president of the Southern Baptist Convention (1938–40).

== Works ==
- Scarborough, L. R. With Christ After the Lost, A Search for Souls. Nashville, Tenn: Sunday school board, Southern Baptist convention, 1919.
- Scarborough, L. R. A Modern School of the Prophets; A History of the Southwestern Baptist Theological Seminary, a Product of Prayer and Faith, Its First Thirty Years, 1907-1937. Nashville: Broadman Press, 1939.
- Scarborough, L. R. How Jesus Won Men. New York: Doran, 1926.
- Scarborough, L. R. After the Resurrection--What? Grand Rapids: Zondervan, 1942.
- Scarborough, L. R. Marvels of Divine Leadership; Or, The Story of the Southern Baptist 75 Million Campaign. Nashville, Tenn: Sunday school board Southern Baptist convention, 1920.
- Scarborough, L. R. A Search for Souls: A Study in the Finest of the Arts- Winning the Lost to Christ. Nashville, Tenn: Sunday school board, Southern Baptist convention, 1925.
- Scarborough, L. R. Christ's Militant Kingdom; A Study in the Trail Triumphant. New York: George H. Doran, 1924.
- Scarborough, L. R. A Blaze of Evangelism Across the Equator. Nashville, Tenn: Broadman Press, 1937.
- Scarborough, L. R. Endued to Win. Nashville: Sunday School Board of the Southern Baptist Convention, 1922.
- Scarborough, L. R. My Conception of the Gospel Ministry. Nashville, Tenn: Sunday School Board of the Southern Baptist Convention, 1935.
- Scarborough, L. R. Prepare to Meet God: Sermons Making the Way to Christ Plain. New York: George H. Doran Co, 1922.
- Scarborough, L. R. Ten Spiritual Ships; The Heaviest Responsibilities of Christ's People. New York: George H. Doran Co, 1927.
- Scarborough, L. R. Recruits for World Conquests. New York: Fleming H. Revell, 1914.
- Scarborough, L. R. Products of Pentecost. New York: Fleming H. Revell Co, 1934.
- Scarborough, L. R. Some Ministerial Danger Signals. Nashville, Tenn.?: Sunday School Board, Southern Baptist Convention?], 1900s.
- Scarborough, L. R. The Tears of Jesus: Sermons to Aid Soul-Winners. New York: George H. Doran, 1922.
- Scarborough, L. R. Holy Places and Precious Promises. Nashville: Sunday School Board of the Southern Baptist Convention, 1924.
- Scarborough, L. R., and Allen Fort. Building for Evangelism: Timely Messages on a Vital Subject. Evangelism in the Construction of Meeting Houses. Nashville, Tenn: Church Architecture Dept., Sunday School Board, Southern Baptist Convention, 1900s.
- Scarborough, L. R., and J. L. Love. A Bundle of Letters: Observations on Mission Fields. Richmond, Va: Foreign Mission Board, Southern Baptist Convention, 1923.
- Scarborough, L. R. Christ's Militant Kingdom: A Study in the Trail Triumphant. Nashville: Sunday School Board of the Southern Baptist Convention, 1924.
- Scarborough, L. R. Vital Essentials Worth Preserving and Perpetuating. Nashville, Tenn: Baptist Sunday School Board, 1939.
- Leavell, Roland Quinche, and L. R. Scarborough. A Handbook for Southern Baptist Participation in "the Nation-Wide Baptist Evangelistic Crusade for 1940.". Atlanta: Published cooperatively by the Home Mission Board, S.B.C. and various Secretaries of the State Mission Boards, 1939.
- Scarborough, L. R. Help Lift the World into the Light: Millions for the Master. Nashville, Tenn: Baptist 75 Million Campaign, 1919.
- Scarborough, L. R. Victory Schools: One in Every Church. Nashville, Tenn: [S.B.C.] Baptist 75 Million Campaign, 1919.
- Scarborough, L. R. Southern Baptists and Evangelism. Atlanta, Ga: Baptist Home Mission Board [Southern Baptist Convention, 1918.
- Scarborough, L. R. Are You Saved or Lost? Nashville, Tenn: Sunday School Board, Southern Baptist Convention, 1920.
- Scarborough, L. R. Chapters from Recruits for World Conquests. Nashville, Tenn: Southern Baptist Convention, Sunday School Board, 1914.
- Scarborough, L. R., B. A. Copass, and E. Leslie Carlson. A Course in Evangelism Based on "How Jesus Won Men". [Fort Worth]: Seminary Book Store, 1900.
- Scarborough, L. R. Volunteers: A Call for Soldiers for Christ. Nashville: Sunday School Board, Southern Baptist Convention, 1918.

== See also ==
- List of Southern Baptist Convention affiliated people
- Southern Baptist Convention
- Southern Baptist Convention Presidents

Preceded by John R. Sampey	President of the Southern Baptist Convention; 1939–1940	Succeeded by W.W. Hamilton
