= Musson (surname) =

Musson is a surname. Notable people by that name include:

- Alfred Musson (1900–1995), English cricketer and British Army officer.
- Anthony Musson, professor of legal history at the University of Exeter.
- Bernard Musson (1925–2010), French actor.
- Chick Musson (1920–1955), English professional footballer.
- Dalan Musson, American screenwriter
- Ellen Musson (1867–1960), chair of the General Nursing Council for England and Wales.
- Francis Musson (1894–1962), English cricketer.
- Geoffrey Musson (1910–2008), British Army officer.
- Jacques Musson, retired French slalom canoeist.
- Jayson Musson (born 1977), American artist.
- Jeremy Musson (born 1965), English author, editor and presenter, specialising in British country houses and architecture.
- Juanita Musson (1923–2011), American restaurateur.
- Karen Musson (born 1967), New Zealand former cricketer.
- Matthijs Musson (1598-1678), painter and art dealer.
- Peter Musson (1940–2022), bassoonist.
- Ron Musson, hydroplane driver.
- Rowland Musson (1912–1943), English cricketer and pilot.
- Sharon Musson (born 1969), New Zealand swimmer.
