= Bob Utley =

American writer

Bob Utley is a contemporary Bible teacher who is best known for his commentary series that covers the Old and New Testaments.

== Education ==
Utley attended East Texas Baptist University from 1969 to 1972 and graduated with a Bachelors in Religion. He then pursued a master's degree in divinity from Southwestern Baptist Theological Seminary between 1972 and 1975. In 1976 he continued post-graduate studies at Baylor University. His academic studies then went on hiatus until 1987 when he began a Doctorate in Ministry with Trinity Evangelical Divinity School in Deerfield, Illinois - which he completed in 1988. In 1991 he once again pursued post-graduate studies, this time in Koine Greek and Hermeneutics at Wycliffe Bible Translators Summer Institute of Linguistics.

== Teaching ==
Utley founded International Sunday School Lessons Inc. which would later become Bible Lessons International and has taught for this non-profit from 1976 until the present. In 1980 he was brought on as a teacher for the Seminary Extension of Southern Baptist Convention of Lubbock Baptist Association and near-simultaneously taught for Wayland Baptist University, the latter ending in 1984 and the prior in 1985.

From 1986 to 1988 Utley taught the weekly "Life and Work" series on the ACTS network of SBC's Radio/TV Commission and at the same time began teaching for United Christian Ashrams, a retreat ministry for adults begun by E. Stanley Jones. Utley continues to work with United Christian Ashrams.

From 1987 to 2003 Utley served on the faculty of East Texas Baptist University's Religion Department teaching Bible Interpretation, Old Testament, and Evangelism. During his tenure at ETBU he was elected "Teacher of the Year" five years, "Favorite Teacher" five years, and "Favorite Professor" two years. In 2008, he received the J. Wesley Achievement Award as one of several ETBU honored by the university's Office of Alumni Relations.

After his tenure at ETBU Utley has continued teaching at various colleges and seminaries including Baptist Seminary in Yerevan Armenia, Emmaus Bible Seminary in Cap-Haitien Haiti, Novi Sad Theological College in Novi Sad Serbia. In 1976, Utley began teaching Verse by Verse, a weekly shortwave radio program on TransWorld Radio in Guam, and John Wesley Methodist Seminary in Monterrey, Mexico.

Utley condensed his Biblical commentary to fit on a DVD, which he makes available in 35 languages at no charge to anyone requesting it.

In 2012, Utley became interim co-pastor of First Baptist Church in Marshall, Texas.

== Publications ==
- Paul's First Letters: Galatians and I & II Thessalonians. 1997.
- The First Christian Primer: Matthew. 1997.
- The Gospel According to Paul: Romans. 1998.
- Paul's Prison Epistles: Colossians, Ephesians, Philemon, and Later, Philippians. 1998.
- Hope in Hard Times - The Final Curtain: Revelation. 1999.
- The Beloved Disciple's Memoir and Letters: John and I, II, and III John. 1999.
- The Superiority of the New Covenant: Hebrews. 1999.
- Jesus' Half-Brothers Speak: James and Jude. 2000.
- Old Testament Survey (Genesis - Malachi). 2000
- New Testament Survey (Matthew - Revelation). 2000.
- The Gospel According to Peter: Mark and I & II Peter. 2001.
- How It All Began: Genesis 1–11. 2001.
- Paul's Letters to a Troubled Church: I & II Corinthians. 2002.
- Old Testament Apocalypses: Daniel and Zechariah. 2005.
- The Post-Exilic Period: Ezra, Nehemiah, and Esther. 2005.
- Moses' Summary of God's Laws: Deuteronomy. 2006.
- The Conquest and Settlement of the Promised Land: Joshua. 2006.
- Wisdom Literature: The Mysterious Books of Ecclesiastes and Song of Songs. 2007.
- The Post-Exilic Prophets: Obadiah, Joel, Haggai, and Malachi. 2007.
- Ezekiel Commentary. 2008.
- The Patriarchal Period: Genesis 12–50. 2009.
- You Can Understand the Bible: An Introduction to and Application of the Contextual/Textual Method of Biblical Interpretation. 1985. Revised and expanded 2009.
- Isaiah: The Clearest Old Testament Witness to YHWH's Eternal, Universal, Redemptive Plan—Isaiah 1-39. 2010.
- Computer Bible Study Library on CD and DVD. 2010.
- Isaiah - Chapters 40 - 66. 2011.
- Jeremiah. 2012.
- Psalms (Books 1 - 2). 2012.
- Psalms (Books 3 - 5). 2013.
- Job. 2014.
- Exodus. 2014.
- Leviticus. 2015.
- Judges, Ruth. 2016.
- 1 & 2 Chronicles. 2016.
- 1 & 2 Samuel. 2017.
- 1 & 2 Kings. 2018.
- Proverbs. 2019.

== Bibliography ==
- Bible Lessons International: About Our Founder, Dr. Bob Utley.
- WorldCat Identities: Utley, Bob.

== See also ==
- Southern Baptist Convention
