= Benajah Harvey Carroll =

American theologian (1843–1914)

1st President of Southwestern Baptist Theological Seminary
- In office 1908–1914
- Preceded by: None
- Succeeded by: Lee Rutland Scarborough

Personal details
- Born: December 27, 1843 Carroll County, Mississippi
- Died: November 11, 1914 (aged 70) Waco, Texas
- Parent(s): Benajah and Mary Carroll
- Education: Baylor University
- Occupation: Theologian, Seminary President, Author, Pastor, Educator

Military service
- Allegiance: Republic of Texas
- Branch/service: Texas State Militia; Confederate States Army
- Years of service: 1862-1864 (C.S.A)
- Unit: 17th Texas Infantry
- Battles/wars: American Civil War

Benajah Harvey Carroll Sr, known as B. H. Carroll (December 27, 1843 – November 11, 1914), was a Baptist pastor, theologian, teacher, author, and orator.

== Biography ==
Carroll was born near Carrollton in Carroll County in north central Mississippi, one of twelve children to Benejah Carroll and Mary Eliza (Mallard) Carroll. His father was a Baptist Preacher and was also a farmer. In 1858, his father moved the family to Burleson County, Texas.

Carroll served in the army of the Confederate States of America from 1862 to 1864. In 1865, at the age of twenty two, he converted to Christianity at a Methodist camp meeting after taking up a preacher's challenge to experiment with Christianity. In 1866, he took as a second wife the former Ellen Virginia Bell. The first wife was divorced for her infidelity while Carroll was at war. After her death, he married the former Hallie Harrison in 1899.

Carroll was head of Baylor University's original Bible College in Waco, Texas and was the founder of Southwestern Baptist Theological Seminary in the city of Fort Worth, Texas. He was also a denominational leader both in the Baptist General Convention of Texas (of which he was a leading founder) and the Southern Baptist Convention. Much of his rise to prominence developed through proving himself a formidable foe in controversy - including debates with Texas politicians, standing for board policies and convention authority in the Hayden controversy in the Baptist General Convention, and opposing the president of Southern Seminary during the Whitsitt controversy at Southern Baptist Theological Seminary. While Carroll had Landmark tendencies, he was not the champion of the Landmark Movement some have made him to be. Of the four major controversies involving Landmark ideas, Carroll sided against the Landmarkers in three of the four. Only in the Whitsitt controversy did Carroll side with Landmarkers and, for Carroll, that controversy was about trustee authority, not Landmark beliefs.

Carroll's theology can best be described as thoroughly Baptist. His thoughts on eschatology was not the expectation that every soul in every community would be converted but instead a strong conviction and assurance in the work, authority, and the "appointment of" through Holy Ghost, or Holy Spirit. The only paraclete, the Vicar of Jesus Christ, in which churches who accepted their role as God's instruments on earth would not ultimately fail in the Holy Spirit's mission to bring about the conversion of the vast majority of humanity recognizing this absolute sovereign order, at which time Christ would return to fully institute His kingdom on earth. Carroll vehemently attacked Roman Catholicism for the papal claim that usurped the Holy Spirit's role as Christ's representative, the Restoration Movement for their reliance on human apprehension and denial of direct revelation, and modernism for the over-reliance on scientific method to the exclusion of Divine revelation and historical evidence. He led in the founding of Southwestern Baptist Theological Seminary in 1908 and it was officially established in the city of Fort Worth, Texas in 1910. He served as president of the seminary until his death.

Carroll's younger brother, James Milton Carroll, was also an important Baptist leader in Texas. His son, B.H. Carroll Jr., would later become Tarrant County school superintendent and the namesake of the Carroll Independent School District in Southlake, Texas.

Carroll published 33 volumes of works, and is best known for his 17-volume commentary, An Interpretation of the English Bible. Benajah Harvey Carroll died November 11, 1914, and is buried at the Oakwood Cemetery in Waco, Texas.

== Southern Baptist conservative resurgence ==
While Carroll was known for his expositional preaching and had agreed with the first article of the New Hampshire confession of faith, which said that the Scriptures were "truth without any mixture of error for its matter," the doctrine of Scripture was not the most notable tenet of Carroll's theology and work. His work on the subject, inspiration of Scripture, was compiled and published posthumously by J. B. Cranfill in 1930. Beginning in the late-sixties and having its height in the late-seventies and early- to mid-eighties, the conservative resurgence looked toward Carroll as a foundation for their own arguments and as an example of the historic Southern Baptist position on the inerrancy of Scripture.

Harold Lindsell extensively outlined Carroll's position in one of his works. Lindsell also stated, "This volume [Inspiration] should be republished today and read by tens of thousands of Baptists so that they would better understand the theological roots from which they have sprung." The year after Lindsell published those words, Thomas Nelson reprinted Inspiration, including two additional prefaces. One preface was by W. A. Criswell, who in that preface saw the reprint as "timely," and coming at "a crucial time in our history." Criswell had earlier served as a catalyst for the resurgence in his publication, Why I Preach that the Bible Is Literally True, in which Criswell had referred to Carroll. Other members of the conservative resurgence also cited Carroll's work in their defenses of the inerrancy of Scripture.

== Prominent students ==
- Walter Thomas Conner

== See also ==
- Southwestern Baptist Theological Seminary
- B. H. Carroll Theological Institute
- List of Baptists
- List of preachers
