= Phillip Lee Jr. =

American Navy admiral and Southern Baptist minister

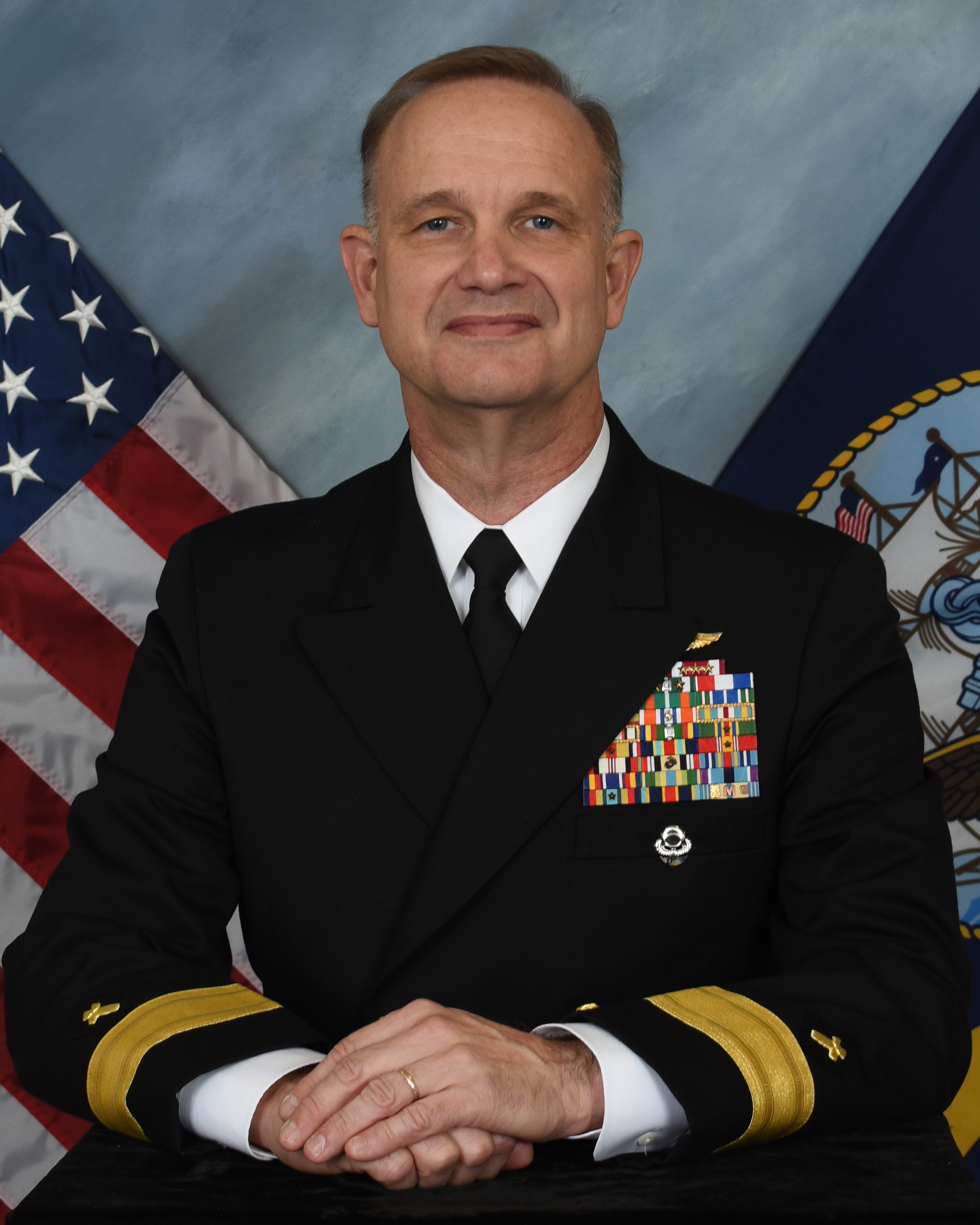
Rear Admiral Lee in 2016

Phillip 'Endel' Lee Jr. is a Rear Admiral in the United States Navy Reserve.

== Career ==
Lee enlisted in the United States Marine Corps in 1982 and would later become an officer. As a Marine, he was assigned to the 3rd Force Reconnaissance Company and the 4th Reconnaissance Battalion.

In 1993, Lee joined the United States Navy Reserve as a chaplain. His assignments have included serving with the 4th Marine Aircraft Wing, as deputy chaplain of the United States Coast Guard for Reserve Matters and the United States Marine Corps Reserve, being stationed at The Pentagon and as chaplain of the 4th Marine Division.

During the Iraq War, Lee was deployed with the II Marine Expeditionary Force. Afterwards, he was assigned to the Coast Guard in support of Hurricane Katrina rescue and recovery efforts. In 2008, he was deployed as deputy command chaplain of SEAL Team Six during Operation Enduring Freedom. He was later named deputy force chaplain of the Marine Corps Reserve and Director of the Office of Religious Affairs of Combined Joint Task Force - Horn of Africa before returning to the 4th Marine Division. In 2016, he was assigned as Deputy Chief of Chaplains for Reserve Matters. Lee retired in September 2020.

Awards Lee has received include the Defense Meritorious Service Medal, the Meritorious Service Medal, the Navy Commendation Medal, the Coast Guard Commendation Medal with Operational Distinguishing Device, the Transportation 9-11 Medal, the Navy Achievement Medal, the Coast Guard Achievement Medal and the Army Achievement Medal. He is also authorized to wear the Fleet Marine Force Chaplain Insignia.

== Education ==
- University of Mobile (B.A.)
- Southwestern Baptist Theological Seminary (M.Div, M.R.E., Ph.D.)
