= Southwestern Baptist Theological Seminary =

Seminary in Fort Worth, Texas, U.S.

Coordinates: 32.682°N 97.348°W

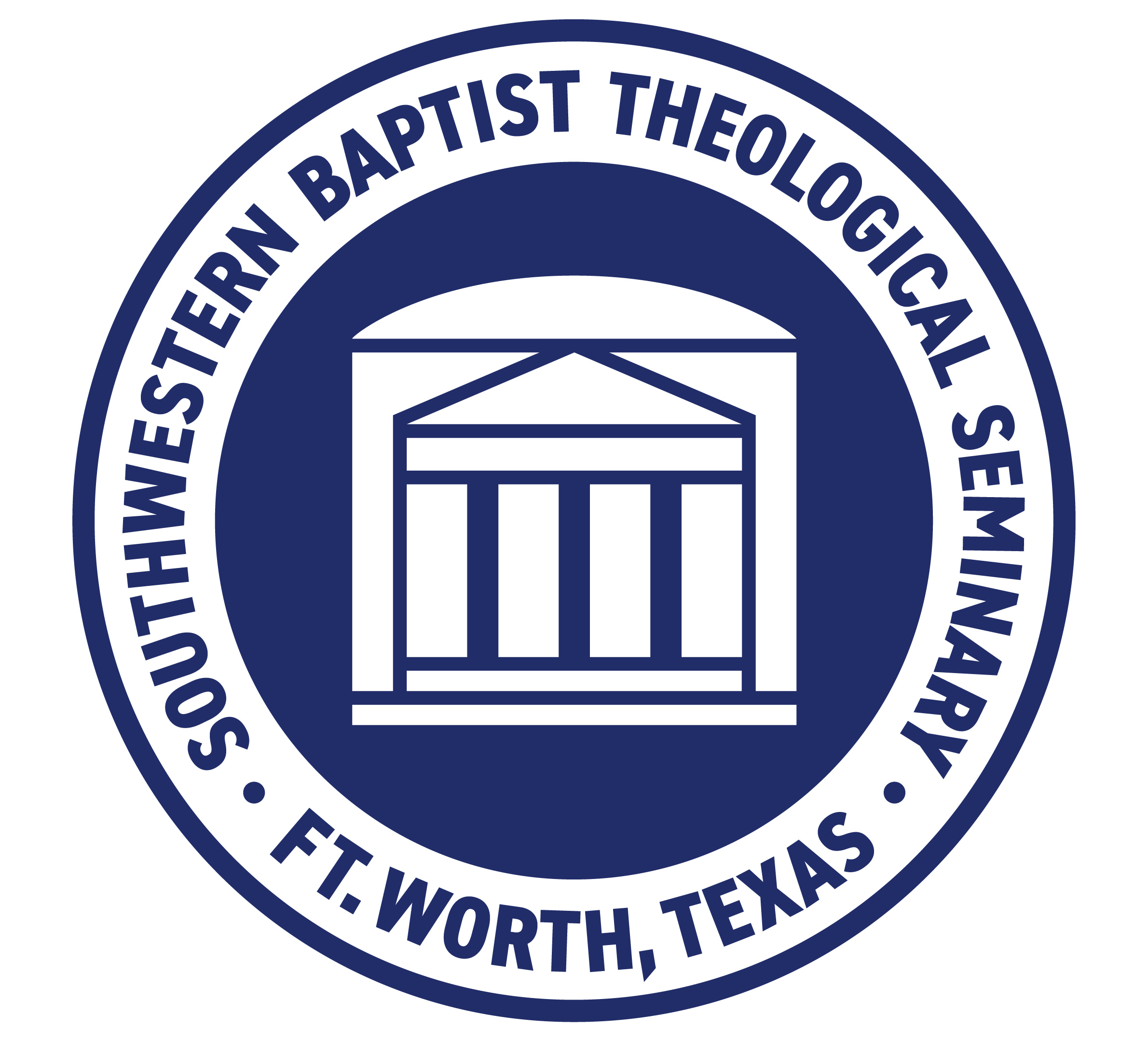
- Former names: Theological Department of Baylor University (1901–05); Baylor Theological Seminary (1905-08)
- Motto: "Preach the Word, Reach the World"
- Type: Department of Baylor University (1901–08); Private seminary (1908-present)
- Established: 1908 (chartered)
- Accreditation: ATS, SACSCOC
- Religious affiliation: Southern Baptist; BGCT (until 1925)
- Academic affiliations: Texas Baptist College
- Chancellor: O. S. Hawkins
- President: David S. Dockery
- Provost: Madison Grace
- Academic staff: 119
- Postgraduates: 2,674
- Location: Waco, Texas (until 1910); Fort Worth, Texas
- Campus: Suburban
- Website: www.swbts.edu

The Southwestern Baptist Theological Seminary is a theological institute in Fort Worth, Texas, United States. It is affiliated with the Southern Baptist Convention. It was established in 1908 and in 2005 was one of the largest seminaries in the world. It is accredited by the Association of Theological Schools in the United States and Canada, the Southern Association of Colleges and Schools Commission on Colleges (SACSCOC), and the National Association of Schools of Music to award diplomas and bachelor's, master's, and doctoral degrees. Two years after being warned, SACSCOC placed the university on probation in June 2025 but all sanctions were removed in June 2026.

== History ==
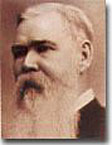
B.H. Carroll

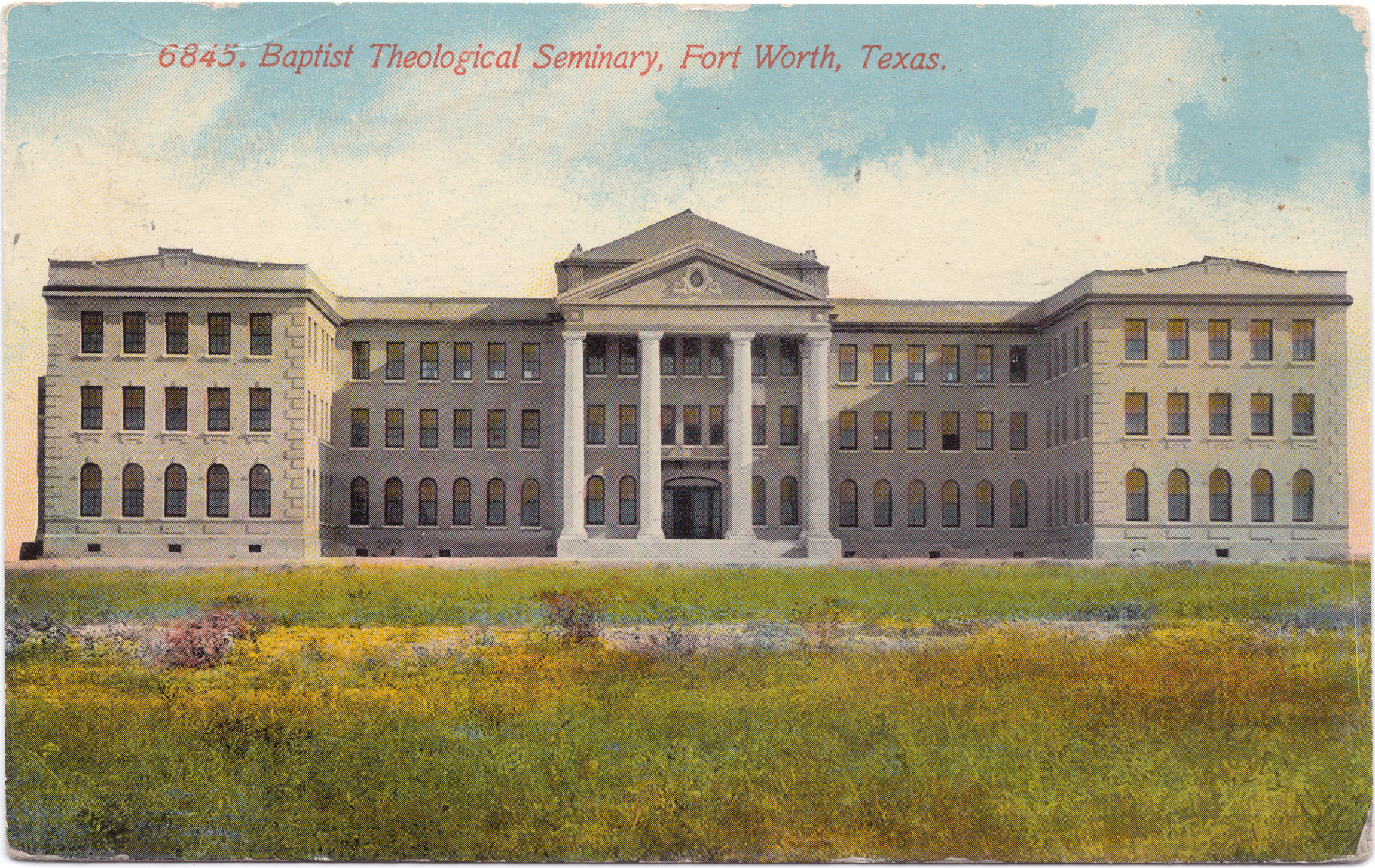
Postcard of the Southwestern Baptist Theological Seminary, 1912

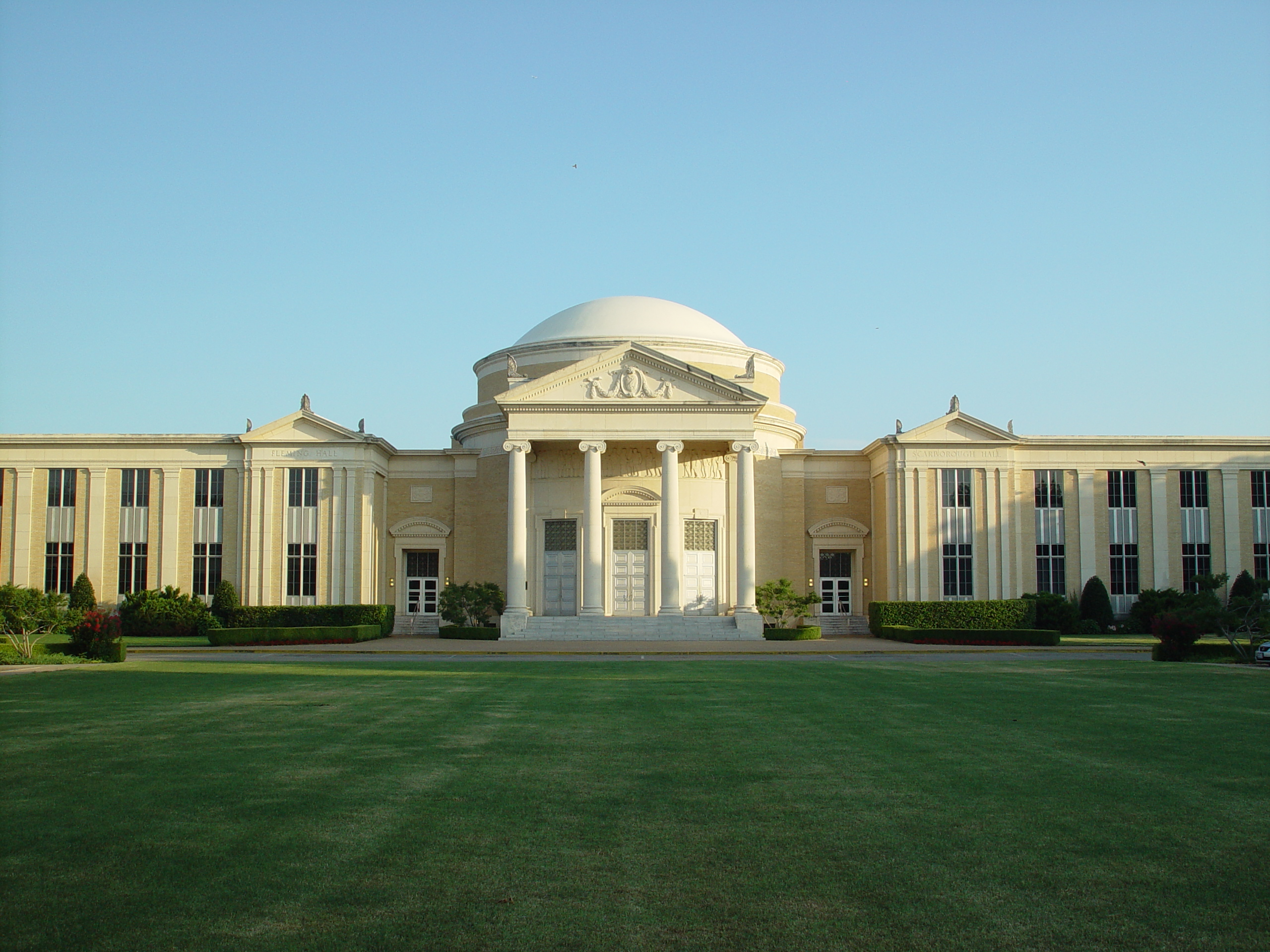
B. H. Carroll Memorial Building, the Southwestern Baptist Theological Seminary's main administrative building

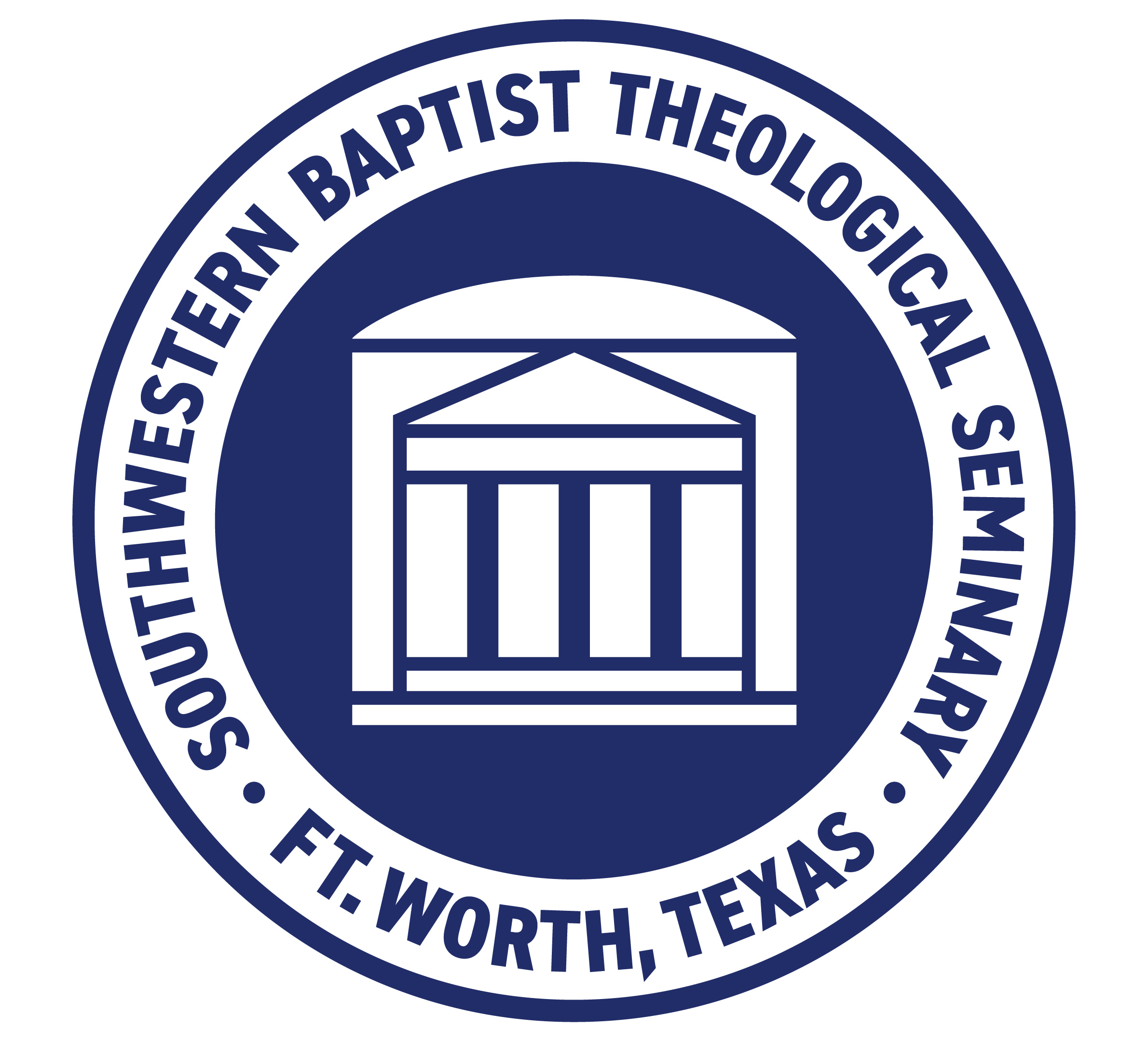
Official seal of Southwestern Seminary

SWBTS grew out of the Baylor University theological department, which was established in 1901. By 1905, B. H. Carroll had managed to convert the department of five professors into the Baylor Theological Seminary, but still under Baylor University. In 1907, while Baylor University President Samuel Palmer Brooks was on vacation in Europe, Carroll, then chairman of the Baylor Board of Trustees, made a motion that the department of religion be separated from the university and chartered as a separate entity. The seminary was established in 1908, with Carroll named as its founding president.

The Southwestern Baptist Theological Seminary received its charter on March 14, 1908, but remained on Baylor's Waco campus until the summer of 1910, when the board accepted an offer made by Fort Worth citizens for a campus site and enough funds to build the first building. The 200-acre (0.81 km^{2}) campus was located on what came to be known as "Seminary Hill," one of the highest natural elevations in Tarrant County. The first building was named "Fort Worth Hall" in honor of the seminary's new location. In 1925, the Baptist General Convention of Texas passed control of the seminary to the Southern Baptist Convention.

The Department of Religious Education and the Department of Gospel Music were established within the seminary in 1915. These departments were eventually converted into schools within the seminary in 1921, becoming the School of Gospel Music and the School of Religious Education. As of 2019, the School of Religious Education is now known as the Jack D. Terry School of Educational Ministries, and the School of Gospel Music is now known as the School of Church Music and Worship.

=== Conservative resurgence: Russell Dilday's dismissal and Ken Hemphill's election ===
In March 1994, the seminary experienced a sudden change in leadership with the dismissal of the seminary's sixth president, Russell H. Dilday, during the Southern Baptist Convention conservative resurgence. On March 9, 1994, the board of trustees voted 26 to 7 to dismiss Dilday after 16 years as seminary president. Dilday was called to a board meeting where he was removed without warning and his office was locked while he was still at the meeting, preventing his removal of personal effects. The Associated Press reported that the newly elected trustee chairman stated that the "institution needed new direction for the 21st century." Students gathered in front of the president's home in protest and support for Dilday. The election of Kenneth S. Hemphill as the seminary's seventh president followed, and he served the seminary from 1994 to 2003.

=== Recent history (21st century) ===
On June 24, 2003, the board of trustees unanimously elected Paige Patterson as the seminary's eighth president. Patterson previously served as president of Southeastern Baptist Theological Seminary for 10 years, thus becoming the second Southern Baptist leader to serve as president for two seminaries within the convention. Patterson also served as the president of the Southern Baptist Convention from 1998 to 2000 and was a leading figure behind the Conservative Resurgence movement within the convention.

In 2006 the seminary imposed a prohibition on professors or administrators promoting charismatic practices, such as private prayer languages.

In 2007 a gender discrimination suit in federal court was filed by Professor Sheri Klouda over her dismissal. Klouda claimed she was dismissed from the faculty due to her gender, being a woman. In response, the seminary commented that Klouda was not dismissed but that she would not have tenure. The Klouda lawsuit was immediately dismissed because of church-state separation-related concerns. The federal judge who dismissed the case stated that "Leaders of a prominent Southern Baptist seminary who believe women are biblically forbidden from teaching men were within their rights when they told a female professor to leave", including a statement that the seminary was well within its First Amendment rights to dismiss Klouda.

In 2011, a campus was established at the Darrington Unit prison in Brazoria County, Texas. The school has significantly reduced the rate of violence in the prison.

In 2014, the school received criticism from other evangelicals when it admitted its first Muslim student from Palestine. The Muslim student was enrolled in Southwestern's PhD program in archaeology. Seminary president Paige Patterson defended his decision to accept the student's application, despite criticism.

The School of Preaching was established in 2015 with David L. Allen serving as the first dean. The purpose of the school is to teach students the importance of text-driven preaching. The seminary added two new graduate programs, Master of Arts in Philosophy and Doctor of Philosophy in World Christian Studies, in 2016. On April 12, 2017, the executive committee reported to the board of trustees that The college at Southwestern would be renamed in honor of the seminary's second president Lee Rutland Scarborough, becoming the L.R. Scarborough College.

In May, Patterson was criticized for his comments and views on women and sexual harassment. On May 22, 2018, after a 13-hour discussion with the trustee board of Southwestern, Patterson was appointed President Emeritus. On May 30, however, the executive committee of the Southwestern trustees voted to remove all benefits provided to Patterson, including the title of President Emeritus. Patterson was immediately fired from SWBTS. D. Jeffrey Bingham, dean of the School of Theology, was subsequently appointed interim president.

During restructuring occurring in the aftermath of Patterson's departure and the COVID-19 pandemic, SWBTS terminated the Tandy Institute for Archaeology, one of the few biblical (levantine) arcaheology programs offered at a confessional institution at the time. Subsequently the former faculty established the Lanier Center for Archaeology at Lipscomb University funded by lawyer and philanthropist Mark Lanier.

On February 27, 2019, Adam W. Greenway was elected by the board of trustees as the ninth president of the seminary. He was the first alumnus since Russell Dilday to serve as president, having earned his Master of Divinity degree from Southwestern Seminary in 2002. Greenway had previously served as dean of the Billy Graham School of Missions, Evangelism and Ministry at Southern Baptist Theological Seminary in Louisville, Kentucky.

After Greenway’s resignation, David S. Dockery, also an alumnus, was called as interim president on September 27, 2022.

For the year 2021-2022, it had 2,071 students.

In June 2023, the university was placed on "Warning" status by its accreditor, the Southern Association of Colleges and Schools, after the accreditor's board found significant non-compliance with its standards for institutional governance, financial resources and financial conflicts of interest. Two years later, the university was placed on "Probation for Good Cause" status, the most serious sanction the accreditor can apply to a university short of revoking its accreditation.

=== Presidents ===
No.	Name	Term
1	Benajah Harvey Carroll	1908–1914
2	Lee Rutland Scarborough (Note: Scarborough served as acting president after Carroll died, from 1914 to 1915, until being named to the full position.)	1914–1942
3	Eldred Douglas Head	1942–1953
4	J. Howard Williams	1953–1958
5	Robert E. Naylor (Note: Naylor, as chairman of the board of trustees, served as chairman of an "interim administrative committee" after the death of Williams until he was appointed to the full position.)	1958–1978
6	Russell H. Dilday	1978–1994
–	William B. Tolar (Note: Tolar served as acting president after Dilday was let go.)	1994
7	Kenneth S. Hemphill	1994–2003
8	L. Paige Patterson	2003–2018
–	D. Jeffrey Bingham (Note: Bingham served as interim president after the firing of Patterson.)	2018–2019
9	Adam W. Greenway	2019–2022
10	David Dockery (Note: In the aftermath of Greenway's resignation, it was first announced that O. S. Hawkins was named acting president. However, in a change of plans, David Dockery was instead named interim president with Hawkins as a senior advisor as part of a "joint interim leadership" team. After serving as interim president from 2022 to 2023, Dockery was named to the full position in 2023, and Hawkins was named chancellor.)	2022–present

== Administration and faculty ==
SWBTS is currently administered by a 40-member board of trustees serving staggered terms of office. Board members are elected by the Southern Baptist Convention. Trustees elect faculty members and administrative officers. Financial support is derived from the Southern Baptist Convention's Cooperative Program, endowment earnings, gifts and student fees.

Adam W. Greenway was the ninth president of the seminary. The full-time faculty includes approximately seventy individuals with nearly twice as many part-time and adjunct faculty members.

== Academics ==
Aside from theology, the school offers a wide variety of graduate majors such as apologetics, biblical counseling, Christian education, divinity, Islamic studies, missiology, and music.

Since 1908, Southwestern Seminary has graduated more than 44,000 students. Southwestern's current student body represents 46 states and 45 countries. The seminary's academic journal, Southwestern Journal of Theology has been published since 1958. It is conservative and Baptist in orientation.

In the fall of 2005, the seminary converted its undergraduate program into the L.R. Scarborough College, later renamed Texas Baptist College. In 2007 the seminary began an initiative for engaging and transforming culture, its new Center for Cultural Engagement, named in honor of Richard Land. In line with this initiative, the seminary employed prominent intelligent design advocate William A. Dembski. In 2016, the seminary added a master's degree program in Philosophy. The program was approved by the board of trustees and, in January 2017, by the accreditation body, the Association of Theological Schools (ATS). Southwestern's then president, Paige Patterson, stated, "Everybody is a philosopher, the question is are you a good one or a bad one? We are committed to having good philosophers and to making good thinkers and philosophers out of our people."

Southwestern is divided into six schools:

- The School of Theology
- The School of Church Music and Worship
- The Jack D. Terry School of Educational Ministries
- The Roy J. Fish School of Evangelism and Missions
- The Texas Baptist College

=== School of Theology ===
Established in 1908, the School of Theology trains seminary student for master's or doctorate degrees in theology. Concentrations include biblical languages, apologetics, theology, church history, preaching, pastoral ministry, etc. Students are able to obtain a master's or doctoral degree designed as an entrypoint into Christian ministry in a variety of contexts. The current interim dean is W. Madison Grace II.

=== School of Church Music and Worship ===
Originally a department within the School of Theology, the School of Gospel Music was established in 1921. The school was renamed to the School of Sacred Music in 1926, a name which it bore until 1957 when the school was renamed the School of Church Music. In 2019, the school was renamed the School of Church Music and Worship. The current dean of the school is Joseph R. Crider.

=== Jack D. Terry School of Educational Ministries ===
The Terry School of Educational Ministries offers several different master's and doctoral degrees such as the Master of Arts in Christian Education (MACE). The school was originally a department within the School of Theology until the School of Religious Education was established in 1921. The school was renamed to the School of Educational Ministries in 1997. The school was officially renamed in 2009 in honor of Jack D. Terry. Current concentrations provided in this school include biblical counseling, children's ministry, collegiate ministry, and student ministries. The current dean is Chris Shirley.

=== Roy J. Fish School of Evangelism and Missions ===
In 2005, the division of evangelism and missions in the School of Theology was reorganized as the Roy J. Fish School of Evangelism and Missions. This division provides students with spiritual "mentorship, a solid theological grounding in Scripture, and coursework that equips" them "to share the Gospel with intelligence, relevance and boldness." The current dean is Dean Sieberhagen.

== Religious beliefs ==
The Baptist Faith and Message (2000) is the seminary's confessional statement (see the Southwestern Declaration on Academic and Theological Integrity). The Chicago Statement on Biblical Inerrancy and the Danvers Statement on Biblical Manhood and Womanhood provide further interpretive guidance related to the seminary's doctrinal positions on the nature of biblical inspiration and gender roles, respectively.

== Extension campuses ==
Southwestern Baptist Theological Seminary has its main campus in Fort Worth, but also offers programs and selected degrees at remote campuses.

- Master of Arts in theology (Bonn, Germany)

== Controversies ==
In 2019, after the scandals of sexual abuse accusations involving the deacon Paul Pressler and sexual abuse cover-ups involving President Paige Patterson, the school removed the stained-glass windows from the MacGorman Chapel, which despicted the two men as actors of a "conservative resurgence".

In 2023, trustees reported that the seminary had accumulated a deficit of $140.1 million from 2002 to 2022, due to excessive expenses by President Paige Patterson.

== Notable people ==
=== Faculty ===
Name	Known for	Relationship to SWBTS
Benajah Harvey Carroll	Pastor, theologian	SWBTS founder and first president
Walter Thomas Conner	Theologian	Professor 1910-1949
William A. Dembski	Proponent of intelligent design	Former professor of Apologetics
David S. Dockery	Former president of Union University & Trinity Evangelical Divinity School	Distinguished Professor of Theology, Theologian-in-Residence, current president of SWBTS
E. Earle Ellis	New Testament scholar	Research Professor of Theology Emeritus
William Roscoe Estep	Baptist and Anabaptist historian, professor	Professor of Church History Emeritus
James Bruton Gambrell	Theologian	Chair of Christian Ethics and Ecclesiology from 1912 to 1914
James Leo Garrett Jr.	Theologian	Distinguished Professor Emeritus of Theology
T. B. Maston	Christian ethicist, civil rights advocate	Professor of Christian Ethics
C. Barry McCarty	Chief Parliamentarian of Southern Baptist Convention	Professor of Preaching and Rhetoric
J. Frank Norris	Fundamentalist preacher	SWBTS trustee
L. Paige Patterson	Former president of the Southern Baptist Convention	SWBTS eighth president
Lee Rutland Scarborough	Professor, evangelist	SWBTS second president

=== Alumni ===
SWBTS includes many notable and well-known alumni, including several Southern Baptist Convention presidents, a U.S. Senator, a U.S. governor, U.S. presidential candidates, members of the White House Cabinet of the United States, seminary presidents, pastors, educators, theologians, civil rights activists, songwriters, and authors.

Name	Known for	Relationship to SWBTS
Daniel Akin	President, Southeastern Baptist Theological Seminary	Master of Divinity
Mark Brister	14th president of Oklahoma Baptist University, Humanitarian, Baptist Pastor	Master of Divinity / Doctor of Ministry
Gary Chapman	Author of The Five Love Languages series	Master of Religious Education / Doctor of Philosophy
Dondi E. Costin	6th president of Liberty University, Chief of Chaplains of the United States Air Force (2015–2018)	Master of Divinity
Ronnie Floyd	60th Southern Baptist Convention president, 2014 - 2016.	Master of Divinity
Steve Gaines	61st Southern Baptist Convention president, 2016–2018	Master of Divinity
Louie Giglio	Pastor, Passion City Church; founder, Passion Movement	Master of Divinity
Jack Graham	55th Southern Baptist Convention president, 2002–2004, senior pastor of Prestonwood Baptist Church	Master of Divinity, Doctor of Ministry
J. D. Grey	28th Southern Baptist Convention president, pastor of First Baptist Church of New Orleans, 1937–1972	Master's degree
William Alvin Hatton	Featured missionary in Brazil; founded Royal Ambassadors in Brazil	Bachelor's degree (1942–1945)
George E. Hearn	Psychologist and professor at Louisiana College	Master's degree
Mike Huckabee	44th governor of Arkansas & U.S. presidential candidate in 2008 and 2016.	Graduate study (one year)
Jack Frasure Hyles	Pastor of the First Baptist Church of Hammond, IN (1951–2001), founder of Hyles-Anderson College	Master's Degree
Jeff Iorg	President, Gateway Seminary (formerly Golden Gate Baptist Theological Seminary)	Doctor of Ministry
Robert Jeffress	Senior pastor, First Baptist Church (Dallas, Texas)	Doctor of Ministry
James Lankford	Junior United States senator (R-OK), 2015–present	Master of Divinity
Larry Lea	Televangelist	Attended the doctoral program
Phillip Lee, Jr.	United States Navy Reserve rear admiral	Master of Divinity (1990), Master of Religious Education (1998) and Doctor of Philosophy degree (2000)
Fred L. Lowery	Pastor of First Baptist Church of Bossier City, Louisiana; Televangelist, "The First Word"	Master of Theology
Robert L. Lynn	President of Louisiana College 1975–1997	
Baylus Benjamin McKinney	Singer, hymnist	Seminary student
Erwin McManus	Lead pastor of Mosaic Church	Master of Divinity
Charles Robert McPherson	Senior pastor of Riverside Baptist Church in Denver, Colorado, 1962-1986	Master's degree
Don Miller	Republican member of the Tennessee House of Representatives	M.R.E.
Bill Moyers	11th White House Press Secretary for U.S. 36th president Lyndon B. Johnson, journalist	Master of Divinity
John R. Rice	Evangelist and founder of Sword of the Lord fundamentalist publications	Attended in 1920
Lester Roloff	Evangelist within Independent Baptist movement, controversial operator of girls rehabilitation home	Master of Divinity
Rick Scarborough	Former pastor, heads Vision America	Master of Divinity
Earl Stallings	Minister and Civil Rights Movement Activist	Master of Divinity
Charles Stanley	Pastor, First Baptist Church, Atlanta, Georgia	Master of Divinity
William G. Tanner	President of Oklahoma Baptist University 1971–1976	Bachelor of Divinity / Doctor of Theology
Rick Warren	Founder and senior pastor of Saddleback Church	Master of Divinity
Paul Washer	Preacher, founder/director of HeartCry Missionary Society	Master of Divinity
Edwin Barry Young	Founder, Fellowship Church	Master of Divinity
