= David Dockery =

American academic administrator (born 1952)

David Samuel Dockery
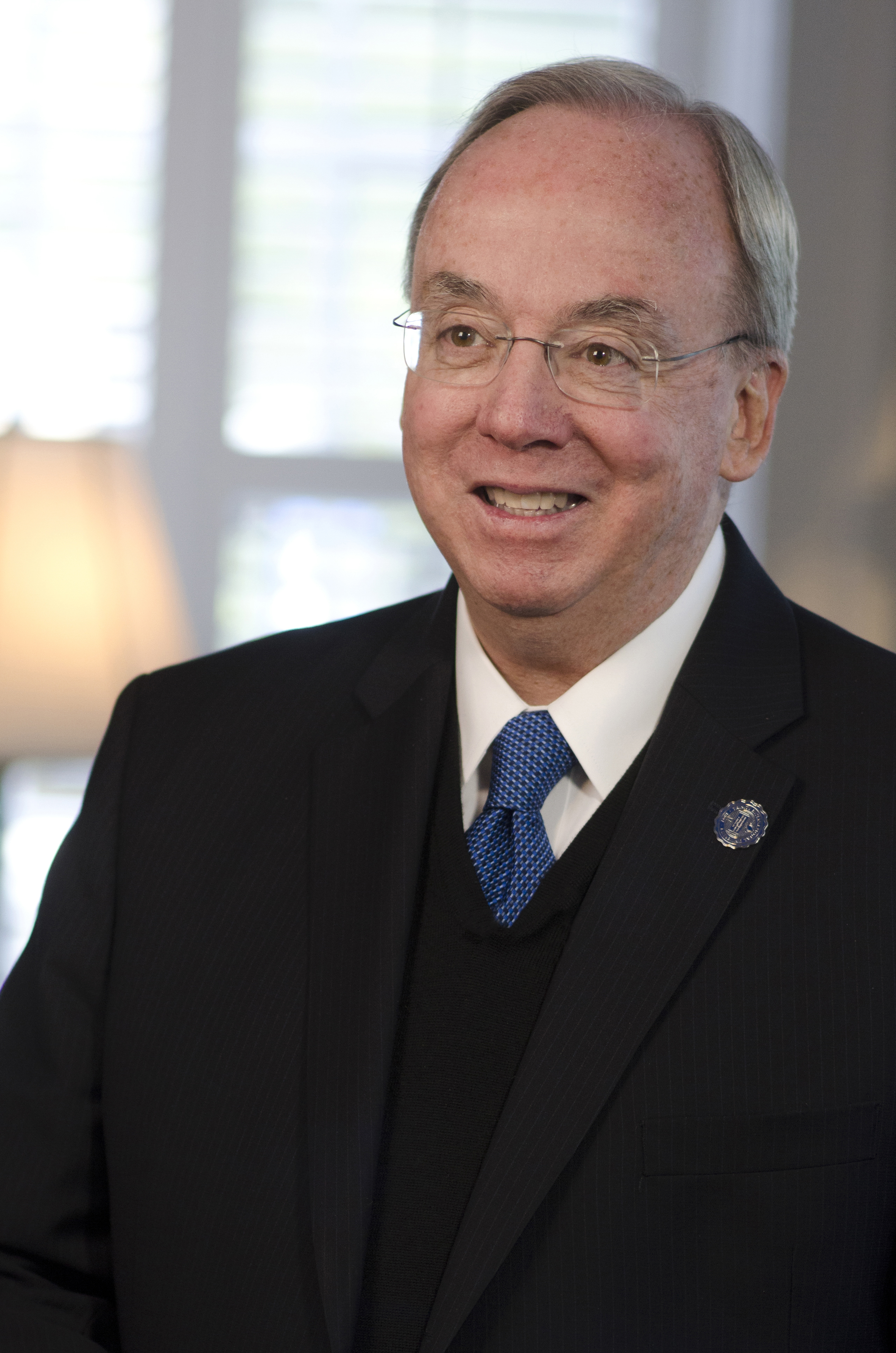
- David S. Dockery, President, Southwestern Baptist Theological Seminary
- Born: October 28, 1952 (age 73); Tuscaloosa, Alabama
- Known for: Chancellor of Trinity International University; Former President of Union University
- Spouse: Lanese (nee Huckeba)
- Children: three sons

Academic background
- Education: University of Alabama-Birmingham, Grace Theological Seminary, Southwestern Baptist Theological Seminary, Texas Christian University
- Alma mater: University of Texas at Arlington (PhD)
- Thesis: An Examination of Hermeneutical Development in Early Christian Thought and Its Contemporary Significance (1988)

Academic work
- Discipline: Biblical studies
- Institutions: Trinity International University

David Samuel Dockery (born October 28, 1952, Tuscaloosa, Alabama) is the President of the International Alliance for Christian Education. He is also Distinguished Professor of Theology and on April 19, 2023 was elected the 10th President of Southwestern Baptist Theological Seminary. Formerly he served as Trinity International University's 15th president. He was elected to that presidency on February 28, 2014.

Prior to his time at Trinity he served as the 15th president of Union University, which U.S. News & World Report has listed among the top tier regional institutions in the South each since 1997. Dockery is author or editor of more than 35 books, including: Renewing Minds, Southern Baptist Consensus and Renewal, Biblical Interpretation Then and Now, Theologians of the Baptist Tradition, and the Holman Bible Handbook. His articles have been published in Touchstone, Books & Culture, Christianity Today, and numerous other publications. In addition, he has contributed chapters or articles to more than 40 other publications.

He was elected to Union's presidency on December 8, 1995, and the university increased in student enrollment from 1,975 in the fall of 1996 to 4,259 in the fall of 2012, representing 15 consecutive years of increased enrollment.

Quotations from Dockery have appeared in The Washington Post, The Boston Globe, The Christian Science Monitor, Christian Post, The Dallas Morning News, The Fort Worth Star-Telegram, The Washington Times, The Tennessean, The Commercial Appeal (Memphis), The Atlanta Journal-Constitution, The Birmingham News, The Courier-Journal (Louisville), The Baltimore Sun, The Chronicle of Higher Education, Religion News Service, Bloomberg.com, Forbes.com, Fox.com, and several denominational publications, among others.

He has been interviewed on several national networks: CNN, NBC, ABC, MSNBC, FOX, and numerous local/regional television channels; along with national radio interviews on ABC, FOX, NPR, Moody, Salem, AFR, and others.

In addition to his leadership of the IACE, Dockery has served as Chair of the Board of Directors for the Council for Christian Colleges and Universities. He also served as Chair for the Consortium for Global Education and on the boards of Christianity Today International and the Tennessee Independent Colleges and Universities Association, among other local and national entities.

On January 15, 2013, Dockery announced he would begin the transition process from university president to the role of university chancellor.

Dockery was formally installed as president of Trinity International University on October 23, 2014. In his first year at Trinity, Dockery led work on a new strategic plan called "Heritage and Hope: Trinity 2023", which the Board of Regents passed unanimously on February 27, 2015.

== Education ==
- University of Alabama-Birmingham - Bachelor's degree
- Grace Theological Seminary - Master's degree
- Southwestern Baptist Theological Seminary - Master's degree
- Texas Christian University - Master's degree
- University of Texas at Arlington - Ph.D. in Humanities

== Personal life ==
Dockery and his wife, Lanese, have three married sons and eight grandchildren. He and Lanese have traveled to the various regions of the United States and Canada, as well as to Europe, Latin America, Asia, Africa, Australia, and the Middle East.

== Works ==
=== Thesis ===
- Dockery, David S. The Problem of Indwelling Sin in Romans 7:14-25 (M.Div.). Grace Seminary.
- ———. The Shape of the Pauline Approach to Life in the Spirit (M.A.). Texas Christian University.
- ——— (1988). An Examination of Hermeneutical Development in Early Christian Thought and Its Contemporary Significance (Ph.D.). University of Texas-Arlington.

=== Books ===
- ——— (1991). The Doctrine of the Bible. Nashville, TN: Convention Press. OCLC 24988167.
- ——— (1992). Biblical Interpretation Then and Now: contemporary hermeneutics in the light of the early church. Grand Rapids, MI: Baker. ISBN 9780801030109. OCLC 24952889.
- ———; Garland, David E. (1992). Seeking the Kingdom: The Sermon on the Mount Made Practical. Wheaton, IL: Harold Shaw Publishers. ISBN 9780877887560. OCLC 25281560.
- ——— (1995). Christian Scripture: An Evangelical Perspective on Inspiration, Authority, and Interpretation. Nashville, TN: B&H Publishing. ISBN 9780805410402. OCLC 31132880. - Also translated into Romanian.
- ——— (1996). Ephesians: One Body in Christ. Nashville, TN: Convention Press. ISBN 9780805494181. OCLC 35040246.
- ——— (1998). Our Christian Hope: Bible Answers to Questions About the Future. Nashville, TN: Lifeway Press. ISBN 9780767334778. OCLC 779006246.
- ——— (1999). Basic Christian Beliefs. Shepherd's Notes Series. Nashville, TN: B&H Publishing. ISBN 9780805493801. OCLC 42726211.
- ———; Guthrie, George H. (2004). Holman Guide to Interpreting the Bible: How do you handle a sharper than sharp two-edged Sword? Very Carefully. Nashville, TN: B&H Publishing. ISBN 9780805428582. OCLC 1026483860.
- ———; George, Timothy (2007). Building Bridges: perspectives on Baptist unity. Nashville, TN: Convention Press. ISBN 9780979983108. OCLC 163224578.
- ——— (2007). Renewing Minds: Serving Church and Society Through Christian Higher Education. Nashville, TN: B&H Publishing. ISBN 9780805444957. OCLC 149008139.
- ——— (2008). Southern Baptist Consensus and Renewal: A Biblical, Historical and Theological Proposal. Nashville, TN: B&H Publishing. ISBN 9780805447408. OCLC 181600407.
- ——— (2011). The Pursuit: Chasing Answers to Life's Questions. Nashville, TN: Lifeway Press. - bible studies on Ecclesiastes
- ———; George, Timothy (2012). The Great Tradition of Christian Thinking. Reclaiming the Christian intellectual tradition. Wheaton, IL: Crossway. ISBN 9781433525131. OCLC 752068283.

=== Series edited ===
- ———, ed. (1991–2019). The New American Commentary series. Nashville, TN: B&H Publishing.

=== Books edited ===
- ———; George, Timothy, eds. (1990). Baptist Theologians. Nashville, TN: B&H Publishing. ISBN 9780805465884. OCLC 22572792.
- ———, ed. (1990). Revell Bible Dictionary. Old Tappan, NJ: Fleming H. Revell. ISBN 9780800715946. OCLC 988431901.
- ———; Basden, Paul, eds. (1991). People of God: Essays on the Believers' Church. Nashville, TN: B&H Publishing. ISBN 9780805460230. OCLC 21334098.
- New Testament Criticism and Interpretation, co-editor and contributor with David Alan Black (Grand Rapids: Zondervan, 1991) chapter on "The History of New Testament Interpretation."
- Beyond the Impasse?: Scripture, Interpretation, and Theology in Baptist Life, co-editor with Robison B. James (Nashville: Broadman, 1992) chapter on "A People of the Book: The Crisis of Biblical Authority Today."
- Holman Bible Handbook, general editor and contributor (Nashville: Holman, 1992) sections on "Pauline Letters," "History of Biblical Interpretation," "Christian Faith and the Christian Community," and "The Lord's Supper."
- The Concise Bible Dictionary, consulting editor (Old Tappan: Fleming H. Revell, 1992).
- Holman Book of Biblical Charts, Maps and Reconstructions, contributing editor (Nashville: Holman, 1993).
- ———, ed. (1993). Southern Baptists and American Evangelicals: The Conversation Continues. Nashville, TN: B&H Publishing. ISBN 9780805460414. OCLC 28585502.
- Foundations for Biblical Interpretation, co-editor and contributor with Robert B. Sloan and Kenneth A. Mathews (Nashville: Broadman and Holman, 1994) chapter on "The Study and Interpretation of the Bible."
- The Challenge of Postmodernism: An Evangelical Engagement, editor and contributor (Grand Rapids: Baker/BridgePoint, 1995, revised edition 2001) chapter on "The Challenge of Postmodernism."
- The Best of A. T. Robertson, compiler (Nashville: Broadman and Holman, 1996).
- New Dimensions in Evangelical Theology: Essays in Honor of Millard J. Erickson, editor (Downers Grove: InterVarsity, 1998). Chapter on "Millard J. Erickson."
- Holman Concise Bible Commentary, general editor (Nashville: B&H Publishing, 1998). Section on the "Pauline Epistles." Translated into Spanish.
- The Integration of Faith and Learning: A Basic Bibliography, editor and compiler (1998).
- The Future of Christian Higher Education, co-editor with David P. Gushee (B&H Publishing, 1999). Chapters on "The Future of Christian Higher Education: An Introduction," "The Great Commandment As a Paradigm for Christian Higher Education," "The Role of Professional Education in Christian Higher Education," and "The Grandeur of God and Real Education: A Strategy for Integrating Faith in a Post-Christian Culture."
- New Testament Interpretation, co-edited with David Alan Black (Nashville: B&H Publishing, 2000). Chapter on the History of New Testament Interpretation.
- Theologians of the Baptist Tradition, co-edited with Timothy George (Nashville: B&H Publishing, 2001). Chapters on John A. Broadus, A.T. Robertson, and Hershel Hobbs.
- Shaping a Christian Worldview, co-edited with Greg Thornbury (Nashville: B&H Publishing, 2002). Chapter on Shaping a Christian Worldview.
- John A. Broadus: A Living Legacy, co-edited with Roger Duke (Nashville: B&H Publishing, 2008). Chapter on "Mighty in the Scriptures."
- Southern Baptist Identity: An Evangelical Denomination Faces the Future (Wheaton: Crossway, 2009). Chapter on "Southern Baptists in the 21st Century."
- Christian Leadership Essentials, editor (Nashville: B&H Publishing, 2011)
- Southern Baptists, Evangelicals and the Future of Denominationalism, editor (Nashville: B&H Publishing, 2011)
- Faith and Learning: A Handbook for Christian Higher Education, editor (Nashville: B&H Publishing, 2012)
- Worship, Tradition, and Engagement: Essays in Honor of Timothy George, co-edited with James Massey and Robert Smith, Jr. (London: Wipf and Stock Publishers, 2018)

=== Chapters ===
- ——— (1990). "Millard J. Erickson". In ———; George, Timothy (eds.). Baptist Theologians. Nashville, TN: B&H Publishing. pp. 640–659. ISBN 9780805465884. OCLC 22572792.
- ——— (1990). "Baptist Theology and Theologians". In ———; George, Timothy (eds.). Baptist Theologians. Nashville, TN: B&H Publishing. pp. 685–. ISBN 9780805465884. OCLC 22572792.
- ——— (1993). "Introduction to Southern Baptists and American Evangelicals". In ——— (ed.). Southern Baptists and American Evangelicals: The Conversation Continues. Nashville, TN: B&H Publishing. ISBN 9780805460414. OCLC 28585502.
- ——— (1993). "American Evangelical Responses to Southern Baptists". In ——— (ed.). Southern Baptists and American Evangelicals: The Conversation Continues. Nashville, TN: B&H Publishing. pp. 100–. ISBN 9780805460414. OCLC 28585502.

=== Journal articles ===
- ——— (Fall 1981). "Romans 7:14-25: Pauline tension in the Christian life". Grace Theological Journal. 2 (2): 239–257.
- ——— (Fall 1983). "Martin Luther's christological hermeneutics". Grace Theological Journal. 4 (2): 189–203.
