= Paul Chitwood =

American Baptist minister

15th President of the International Mission Board
- Incumbent
- Assumed office November 15, 2018
- Preceded by: David Platt

Executive Director of the Kentucky Baptist Convention
- In office July 1, 2011 – November 15, 2018
- Preceded by: Bill Mackey
- Succeeded by: Todd Gray

President of the Kentucky Baptist Convention
- In office November 2005 – November 2006
- Preceded by: Hershael York
- Succeeded by: Darren Gaddis

First Vice-President of the Kentucky Baptist Convention
- In office November 2004 – November 2005

Personal details
- Born: 1970 (age 55–56) LaFollette, Tennessee
- Spouse: Michelle Elaine Herron
- Children: Two biological: Daniel, Anna; two adopted: Cai, Lilly
- Education: University of the Cumberlands (B.S.); Southern Baptist Theological Seminary (M.S. and Ph.D.)
- Occupation: Baptist minister

Paul Chitwood (born 1970) is an American Baptist minister who is the 13th and current president of the International Mission Board, serving since 2018. He was previously executive director of the Kentucky Baptist Convention (2011–2018) and president of the Kentucky Baptist Convention (2005–2006).

Born in LaFollette, Tennessee, Chitwood graduated from Cumberland College (now the University of the Cumberlands) in Williamsburg, Kentucky, in 1992 and began pastoring his first church a year later. He later continued his studies at the Southern Baptist Theological Seminary in Louisville, Kentucky, earning two graduate degrees. He joined the seminary's faculty in 2002 and was also chosen as a trustee of the Southern Baptist Convention's International Mission Board that year. He was chairman of the board from 2008 until his departure in 2010.

In 2005, Chitwood was elected to a one-year term as president of the Kentucky Baptist Convention (KBC). He was seen as the more theologically conservative of the two candidates for the office. At the expiration of his term, he continued his work as pastor of First Baptist Church in Mount Washington, Kentucky, and with the International Mission Board. In 2011, he was chosen as executive director of the KBC. He oversaw a reorganization of the convention that was credited with reversing a decade-long slide in baptisms and membership. He was an advocate for Sunrise Children's Services, a foster care and adoption agency operated by the KBC. Under Chitwood, Sunrise tripled the number of children it served, and Chitwood and his wife became foster parents for a young girl in Sunrise's care, eventually adopting her. On November 15, 2018, Chitwood accepted the position of President of the International Mission Board (IMB). He was immediately confronted with a report of past unreported or mishandled sexual abuse cases within the IMB, and promised to implement the recommendations of an independent law firm charged with investigating the reports.

Throughout his ministry, Chitwood has opposed the employment of homosexual people by Baptist churches and organizations, expansion of gambling in Kentucky, and the expansion of sales of alcoholic beverages.

== Early life and ministry ==
Paul Chitwood was born in LaFollette, Tennessee in 1970, one of three sons of Thomas Chitwood. His parents divorced when he was two years old, and his father, who maintained custody of Chitwood and his brothers, moved to Jellico, Tennessee. After being invited by the deacons of First Baptist Church in Jellico, the family become regular attenders. Chitwood's father, younger brother Dana, and Chitwood himself became professing Christians and were baptized into the church. Despite a fear of public speaking, Chitwood became a minister and preached his first sermon on a Wednesday night at his home church after the pastor had resigned. A car accident he was involved in as a teenager strengthened his resolve to pursue ministry.

In 1992, Chitwood earned a Bachelor of Science degree in religion with a minor in biblical language at Cumberland College (now the University of the Cumberlands) in Williamsburg, Kentucky. He later attended the Southern Baptist Theological Seminary in Louisville, Kentucky, where he earned the Master of Divinity in 1995 and a doctorate degree in 2001. His dissertation was entitled "The Sinner's Prayer: An Historical and Theological Analysis."

Chitwood became pastor of South Fork Baptist Church in Owenton, Kentucky, in 1993. In 1995, he left South Fork and became pastor of First Baptist Church in Owenton, serving until 1999. That year, he became pastor of First Baptist Church in Somerset, Kentucky. In 2003, he left to pastor First Baptist Church in Mount Washington, Kentucky, a congregation of approximately 2,000 people. While pastoring in Mount Washington, he opposed a local option ordinance to allow the sale of alcoholic beverages on Sundays.

Chitwood married his high school girlfriend, Michelle Elaine Herron, in 1993. The couple has two biological children: a son, Daniel, and a daughter, Anna. They have a daughter, Cai, who they adopted from an orphanage in China, and a daughter, Lilly, who they adopted in 2018 after serving as her foster parents for three years through Sunrise Children's Services, a ministry of the Kentucky Baptist Convention.

== Work with the Southern Baptist Convention ==
In 2002, Chitwood joined the faculty of Southern Baptist Theological Seminary. That same year, he became a trustee of the International Mission Board, and he was chosen president of the Kentucky state pastors' conference. In 2008, he was chosen by his fellow trustees as chair of the IMB board of trustees. Chitwood left the IMB board of trustees in 2010.

=== President of the Kentucky Baptist Convention ===
Chitwood was elected to a one-year term as first vice-president of the Kentucky Baptist Convention in 2004. The following year, he was a candidate to succeed outgoing president Hershael York as president. The conservative York had been elected the previous year in a close vote of 686 to 627 over Rusty Ellison, who was seen as a moderate candidate. Chitwood was seen as the conservative candidate against another moderate, Robert DeFoor. DeFoor published a letter decrying the rise of fundamentalism within the KBC and saying that Chitwood was the choice of the fundamentalists; he later clarified that he did not know Chitwood personally very well, and was not accusing him of being a fundamentalist. Chitwood called DeFoor's comments "divisive". Chitwood won the election by a vote of 974 to 601.

During Chitwood's term as president, the University of the Cumberlands – a KBC-affiliated university and Chitwood's alma mater – was criticized for expelling a student who posted on MySpace that he was homosexual, in violation of the school's code of conduct, which stated: "any student who engages in or promotes sexual behavior not consistent with Christian principles (including sex outside marriage and homosexuality) may be suspended or asked to withdraw." Critics asked then-Governor Ernie Fletcher to use his line-item veto power to remove an $11 million state budget allocation for a new pharmacy school at the University of the Cumberlands because of the expulsion, but Fletcher, an ordained Baptist minister, declined. Chitwood supported the expulsion and Fletcher's decision not to veto the allocated funding.

=== Executive Director of the Kentucky Baptist Convention ===
In 2010, then-president of the Kentucky Baptist Convention Don Mathis asked Chitwood to consider becoming a candidate for executive director of the KBC, replacing retiring executive director Bill Mackey. Chitwood declined, but agreed to serve on the 15-member search committee. After the committee reached an impasse in the search process, the committee chair asked Chitwood to reconsider. Chitwood agreed and resigned from the search committee. On May 12, the committee recommended Chitwood for the position, and on June 2, he was elected by a vote of 88–7. He officially took office July 1, 2011.

In May 2012, Chitwood announced a major reorganization of the KBC, focusing more resources on starting new churches, strengthening existing churches, and reaching individuals who did not attend church. In 2015, KBC churches reported an increase in church membership and number of baptisms, reversing a decade-long trend of decline. In 2016, the KBC announced that member churches had contributed $22.3 million to the Southern Baptist Convention through the Cooperative Program, more than any other year in the organization's history.

During his time as executive director, Kentucky Governor Steve Beshear proposed legalizing casino gambling in the state as a means of raising revenue for the state treasury. Chitwood opposed this effort, recording an ad broadcast on Christian radio stations and distributing a video to Southern Baptist churches in Kentucky urging them to resist the governor's proposal.

In 2014, controversy arose in the Kentucky Baptist Convention when Bill Smithwick, CEO of the KBC-operated Sunrise Children's Services, proposed dropping the restriction on the employment of homosexual people by Sunrise. Although Sunrise's board ultimately rejected the proposal and Smithwick resigned as CEO, many Southern Baptist churches in the state withheld their usual donations to the ministry out of fear that the proposal would succeed. Following Smithwick's resignation, Chitwood announced a fundraising campaign intended to raise $5 million to make up for the shortfall produced by the withheld offerings.

Chitwood and his wife, Michelle, led a campaign called "Be the One", urging Kentucky Baptists to become more involved in helping care for abused and neglected children. During his tenure as KBC executive director, Sunrise Children's Services expanded to serve 1,300 children, triple the number served at the beginning of his tenure.

In 2015, Chitwood was the chairman of the Southern Baptist Convention's Committee on Nominations.

During Chitwood's term, Campbellsville University severed its covenant agreements with the KBC in order to gain more autonomy over its affairs. In 2017, Chitwood decried the Campbellsville's decision, along with a similar previous decision by Georgetown College: "Making off with untold millions of mission dollars invested in the institutions over the generations, these schools have not only broken their promises, they have betrayed their mission." In 2018, Chitwood's alma mater, the University of the Cumberlands, also asked to dissolve its covenant agreement with the KBC.

In 2017, Chitwood opined that the Cooperative Baptist Fellowship, an organization to which some Southern Baptist churches also belong, would be taking a step in the wrong direction if it were to soften its stance on hiring LGBT people. The KBC formed a committee to monitor the CBF's policies at its meeting in November 2017, and CBF lifted its ban on employing homosexual people in February 2018. At the KBC annual meeting in November 2018, the convention expelled "more than a dozen" churches who continued to support CBF after the ban was lifted. In a subsequent interview, Chitwood said "the convention could not support groups that 'embrace alternative lifestyles' and adopt policies that 'redefine what is right and wrong' when it comes to Baptist beliefs that homosexuality is a sin."

=== President of the International Mission Board ===
On November 6, 2018, he announced his candidacy for president of the International Mission Board, a position vacated by the resignation of David Platt in September 2018. He was endorsed by Al Mohler, president of Southern Baptist Theological Seminary; Kevin Ezell, president of the North American Mission Board; and Sandra Wisdom-Martin, executive director of the Woman's Missionary Union. On November 15, he was elected by a unanimous vote of the IMB's board of trustees and took office immediately.

At the 2019 meeting of the Southern Baptist Convention, a report was presented by the law firm of Gray Plant Mooty regarding allegations of sexual abuse within the Southern Baptist Convention generally and the IMB generally. The report, commissioned in 2018 before Chitwood's election as IMB president, found "a number of significant concerns with IMB's handling of past cases" and contained several recommendations for policy changes aimed at preventing a recurrence of such incidents. On the day the report was released, Chitwood published a statement on the IMB web site apologizing for the past incidents and promising to adopt the policy recommendations contained in the report.
