= Frank Page (Southern Baptist) =

American pastor (born 1952)

- Former President of the Southern Baptist Convention
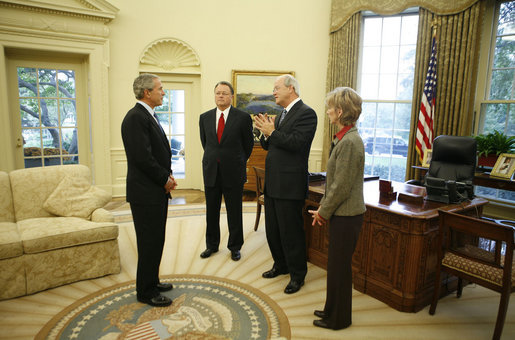
- President George W. Bush meets with the leadership of the Southern Baptist Convention in the Oval Office at the White House; pictured with the President are (from left to right) Morris Chapman, Page, and Page's wife Dayle
- Church: First Baptist Church, Taylors, South Carolina
- Installed: June 2006
- Term ended: June 2008
- Predecessor: Bobby Welch
- Successor: Johnny Hunt

Personal details
- Born: Frank S. Page; August 23, 1952 (age 74) Robbins, North Carolina, U.S.
- Denomination: Southern Baptist

Frank S. Page (born August 23, 1952) was the president of the Southern Baptist Convention (SBC) from 2006 to 2008, and the president of the denomination's Executive Committee from 2010 to 2018. Page announced his resignation on March 27, 2018, admitting to "a personal failing" that involved a "morally inappropriate relationship." Frank Page pastored Pebble Creek Baptist Church in South Carolina from June 2019 to February 2024.

== Church Leader ==
Page was born in Robbins, North Carolina, on August 23, 1952. He was invited to attend Southside Baptist Church in Greensboro, North Carolina, where he professed faith in Jesus Christ at age 9.

A graduate of Ben L. Smith High School in Greensboro, he earned a Bachelor of Science degree from Gardner-Webb University in North Carolina, majoring in Psychology. He was ordained at Immanuel Baptist Church in Greensboro in 1974. He received the Master of Divinity degree and earned his Ph.D. in Christian ethics from Southwestern Baptist Theological Seminary in Fort Worth, Texas, in 1980 at the age of 28. He is the author of several books, has written articles for various publications and was the lead writer for the Advanced Continuing Witness Training material.

Page's election to his current position followed 34 years of church and denominational service. He served as pastor of Live Oak Baptist Church, Gatesville, Texas (1979–81), LaFayette Baptist Church, Fayetteville, North Carolina (1981–87), Gambrell Street Baptist Church, Fort Worth, Texas (1987–91), Warren Baptist Church, Augusta, Georgia (1991-2001), and First Baptist Church, Taylors, South Carolina (2001–09). Under his leadership, First Baptist Church of Taylors experienced a period of rapid growth, reaching average worship attendance of over 2,400. Page currently served as Lead Pastor of Pebble Creek Baptist Church in Taylors, South Carolina (2019-2024).

Page and his wife, the former Dayle Gibson, have three daughters, Melissa (d. November 2009), Laura, and Allison.

== SBC Executive ==
Page was president of the Southern Baptist Convention (SBC) from 2006 to 2008 and served as vice president of evangelism for the North American Mission Board of the Southern Baptist Convention, 2009-2010. He was a member of the SBC's Great Commission Resurgence Task Force in 2009-2010 and a director of Baptist Global Response from 2008 to 2010.

In June 2006 Page was nominated by Florida pastor Forrest Pollock to become Southern Baptist Convention President. Pollack stressed how much Page's church contributed to the Cooperative Program, which funds SBC projects. After his election, Page said the convention would not change its views on social issues like same-sex marriage or abortion. He said "I do not want anyone to think I am out to undo a conservative movement."

During his two years as president of the SBC, Page was a frequent guest on national and local television networks and programs, including NBC, CBS, CBN, Fox News, and Larry King Live. In 2007, he was named as one of the Fifty Most Influential Christians in America by the Church Report.

The first year of Page's presidency coincided with a national media focus on clergy sex abuse scandals in numerous Christian denominations. In April 2007, Page published a First Person editorial after he had been interviewed for an ABC News segment. He wrote,

Several days ago, I was interviewed by ABC's "20/20" news for an upcoming program tentatively titled, "Preacher Predators." At the request of several, I agreed to this invitation so as to provide some kind of balance to a program which may well be overwhelmingly negative. . . . As I said to the reporter, we are willing and able to discuss this issue because even one instance of sexual abuse by a minister is too much.

Page called on local churches to "develop written policy guidelines for the care of children and youth," to require background checks for all staff, to prosecute to the fullest extent of the law anyone "who would take advantage of the trust and love of precious children and students," and to take advantage of the resources that are available on the SBC website and through the Convention's LifeWay Christian Resources.

He closed his editorial by saying, "As stated earlier, even one instance of sexual molestation is one too many."

A few months later, during the June 2007 SBC annual meeting, the first annual meeting over which Page presided, messengers adopted a resolution on protecting children from sexual abuse which stated, in part,

RESOLVED, That we strongly recommend that Southern Baptist churches and Convention entities respond to any suspicions or allegations of child abuse in a timely and forthright manner; and be it further

RESOLVED, That we urge Southern Baptist churches and Convention entities to exercise moral stewardship by observing responsible employment practices, including performing criminal background checks on all ministers, employees, and volunteers; and be it further

RESOLVED, That we renounce individuals who commit heinous acts against children; and be it further

RESOLVED, That we renounce individuals, churches, or other religious bodies that cover up, ignore, or otherwise contribute to or condone the abuse of children; and be it finally

RESOLVED, That we pray for righteousness and justice to prevail in our land and intercede on behalf of victimized children, asking God to heal their deep emotional and physical wounds, grow them into mature and healthy adults, and stop the cycle of abuse from repeating itself in another generation.

The following year, at the Convention's 2008 annual meeting, the Convention received a comprehensive report from the Convention's Executive Committee encouraging churches to report any instance of sexual abuse to the legal authorities and to exercise due diligence in protecting the children and youth under the care of their ministries. As part of its report, the SBC Executive Committee announced it had posted a link to the Department of Justice Dru Sjodin National Sex Offender database on the Convention's website, where it remains as a resource for churches and individuals.

In 2009, Page was invited to serve on President Barack Obama's Council on Faith Based and Neighborhood Partnerships. A few months later, he was selected to lead the evangelization group with the Convention's North America Mission Board (NAMB). While serving as SBC president, Page had challenged the mission agency to develop a new evangelism strategy for reaching twenty-first century people with the timeless message of the Gospel of Jesus Christ. NAMB's new strategy was called God's Plan for Sharing (GPS).

When he began his service as president and CEO of the Executive Committee on October 1, 2010, Page set an immediate goal to establish an atmosphere of trust at every level of Convention life.

He pledged to focus his leadership on appealing to Southern Baptists to exercise "Christlike selflessness," to help "younger generations . . . see the value of cooperative work," and to be an encourager. He said, "I encourage Southern Baptists to follow the Bible rather than the way of our culture. We are in the day and time of increasing negativity. In fact, there is a negative spirit in most every area of life and it has often afflicted us in church and denominational work. I encourage people to let the Lord bring about a spirit of kindness, of reconciliation, forgiveness, and unity."

He added, "I also encourage Southern Baptists to realize that we must not only share Christ but we must live out the commands of Christ, or in other words, we need to treat each other the way Christ commands us to treat one another. I'm asking Southern Baptists — from entity presidents to pastors, missionaries, to people in the pew — to make covenants about how we will relate, how we will agree as well as how we will disagree. I believe that we need to be Jesus people!"

In that spirit, during his first report as Executive Committee president at the 2011 annual meeting of the Southern Baptist Convention, Page asked the executive directors of forty-two state Baptist conventions that cooperate with the SBC, the presidents of almost twenty ethnic fellowships that work closely with the SBC, the presidents of each of the eleven SBC ministry entities, the president of the WMU (a missions auxiliary to the SBC), and the president of the SBC to join him in signing a document called Affirmation of Unity and Cooperation.

The document's five core pledges are (1) to maintain a relationship of mutual trust; (2) to attribute the highest motives to those engaged in local church ministries and those engaged in denominational service; (3) to affirm the value of cooperative ministry as the most effective and efficient means of reaching a lost world with the message of the Gospel; (4) to embrace our brothers and sisters of every ethnicity, race, and language as equal partners in our collective ministries: and (5) to honor and affirm proportional giving through the Cooperative Program as the most effective means of mobilizing our churches and extending our outreach as Southern Baptists.

In fulfillment of the fourth pledge in the Affirmation document, Page appointed an Hispanic Advisory Council in September 2011 "to provide information, insight and counsel to NAMB and EC [SBC Executive Committee] staff relative to the special needs and concerns of Hispanic churches and church leaders in the Southern Baptist family of churches."

Also in 2011, Page worked with NAMB to create a new position within the SBC, presidential ambassador for ethnic church relations. Ken Weathersby, former VP for evangelism with NAMB, was tapped to fill the role. Two years later, Page selected Weathersby to serve as vice president for Convention advancement with the SBC Executive Committee. Weathersby became the first African American to hold a vice presidential role at the Executive Committee.

Following the appointment of the Hispanic Advisory Council, Page successively appointed an African American Advisory Council (2012), an Asian Advisory Council (2013), and a Multi-Ethnic Advisory Council (2014), each of which has met at least annually and was tasked to recommend ways in which ethnic churches and church leaders can be more fully engaged as full partners in every level of Southern Baptist life.

He also convened an intercultural summit on theological education with representatives from the SBC's six seminaries and leaders from various ethnic and racial fellowships within the Convention. The summit's assignment was to explore options for "entry-level, low-cost, non-traditional, quality ministerial training and education for pastors and other God-called ministers of the Gospel" which would "lead to admission in degree-seeking courses as students become more fully equipped to pursue accredited higher education goals in specialized fields of study."

In February 2014, in responding to a motion about mental health issues that had been referred to the Executive Committee by messengers to the 2013 SBC annual meeting, Page announced the creation of a mental health advisory council which is slated to issue a report to Page prior to the 2015 SBC annual meeting.

He also appointed an advisory council of bivocational and smaller church pastors to help foster a greater sense of family no matter the size or location of churches within Southern Baptist life.

In March 2018, Page announced his retirement from active ministry. Following reprimand from SBC executives, Page was forced to restate his retirement as a resignation, citing a "morally inappropriate relationship" as the driving cause. Ronnie Floyd replaced Page as Executive Committee president in 2019, and The Tennessean reported (February, 2020) that Page returned to pastoral ministry at Pebble Creek Baptist Church in Taylors, South Carolina. In February 2024, Frank Page resigned from Pebble Creek Baptist Church. A statement from the leadership of the church stated that Page had "recently decided to step away from public ministry, including his role as pastor at Pebble Creek Baptist Church."

== Bibliography ==
- Frank S. Page (1989). Advanced Level CWT [Continuing Witness Training] Manual. Home Mission Board.
- Frank S. Page (1994). Biblical Portraits of Witnessing-Giving Living. Sunday School Board.
- Frank S. Page (1995). Jonah, The New American Commentary, Volume 19b. Broadman and Holman.
- Frank S. Page (1995). Commentary on Mark, Bible Book Series Companion Commentary. Sunday School Board.
- Frank S. Page (2000). Trouble with the tulip: a closer examination of the five points of Calvinism. Riverstone Group Publishing. ISBN 0-9706117-0-6.
- Frank S. Page, with John Perry (2008). The Incredible Shrinking Church. B&H Publishing Group. ISBN 978-0-8054-4661-6.
- Frank S. Page (2008). The Nehemiah Factor: 16 Characteristics of a Missional Leader. New Hope Publishers. ISBN 978-1-59669-223-7.
- Frank S. Page (2013). Melissa: A Father's Lessons from a Daughter's Suicide. B&H Books. ISBN 978-1-4336-7910-0.

== See also ==
- List of Southern Baptist Convention affiliated people
- Southern Baptist Convention
- Southern Baptist Convention Presidents
- Sexual abuse cases in Southern Baptist churches

Preceded by Bobby Welch	President of the Southern Baptist Convention; 2006–07	Succeeded by Johnny M. Hunt
