= Bryant Wright =

American evangelical minister

- Former President of the Southern Baptist Convention
- Church: Johnson Ferry Baptist Church in Marietta, Georgia
- Installed: June 2010
- Term ended: June 2012
- Predecessor: Johnny Hunt
- Successor: Fred Luter

Personal details
- Born: January 1, 1952 (age 74) Columbia, South Carolina
- Denomination: Southern Baptist Convention
- Residence: Marietta, Georgia
- Occupation: Pastor, author
- Education: University of South Carolina

Bryant Wright (born January 1, 1952) is a Baptist pastor and author. He served as senior pastor of Johnson Ferry Baptist Church in Marietta, Georgia from its founding in 1981 until 2019. He also served as elected president of the Southern Baptist Convention (SBC) from June 2010 to June 2012. He succeeded Johnny Hunt, who had served two one-year terms. Wright was succeeded as SBC president by Fred Luter. After having retired as Senior Pastor of Johnson Ferry Baptist Church in 2019, Wright continues to work with Right From The Heart Ministries, and in 2020 was named President of Send Relief, a Christian humanitarian and charitable organization, by the International Mission Board and the North American Mission Board.

== Biography ==
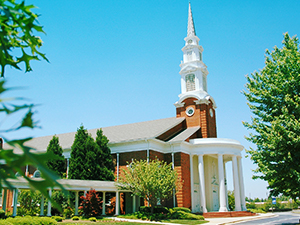
Johnson Ferry Baptist Church, where Wright served as pastor

Wright was born in Columbia, South Carolina. He earned a Bachelor of Arts in English from the University of South Carolina in 1974 and a Master of Divinity from the Southern Baptist Theological Seminary in 1979.

He received honorary doctorates from SEFOVAN Seminary, Madrid, Spain - June 2007 and University of South Carolina - May 2011.

In 1981, he became Senior Pastor of Johnson Ferry Baptist Church in northwest metro Atlanta, with more than 8,000 members as of 2012. As of January 2012, Johnson Ferry Baptist Church had an average worship attendance of over 4,600. In 1992, he founded Right From The Heart Ministries, a radio, television and internet ministry that airs 30 to 60 second inspirational spots on secular radio and television.

Wright is a strong supporter of the Great Commission Resurgence Task Force established by his predecessor, which issued a report that calls for rejuvenation of the SBC with greater emphasis on evangelism. He has called on pastors to try to make more Cooperative Program funding available for missions to unreached people around the world. He has said he dreams of seeing every Southern Baptist pastor and church take at least one mission trip. Wright calls himself "a follower of Jesus Christ that believes the Bible" and says "I really don't believe that human beings are ever going to completely reconcile the sovereignty of God and the free will of man". At the 2011 Southern Baptist Convention, Wright joined Tom Elliff, IMB president, in challenging Southern Baptist churches to claim responsibility by the 2012 SBC annual meeting for reaching all 3,800 unengaged, unreached people groups (UUPG). A UUPG is a distinct people group somewhere in the world with no believers and no one trying to reach them with the gospel.

== Bibliography ==
- Bryant Wright (1997). One minute of your time: right from my heart. Right from the Heart Ministries. ISBN 0-9660935-0-X.
- Bryant Wright. Another Minute of Your Time. Right from the Heart Ministries.
- Bryant Wright (2006). One Minute of Your Day. Winepress Pub. ISBN 1-57921-841-5.
- Bryant Wright (2010). Seeds Of Turmoil. Thomas Nelson. ISBN 978-0-8499-4815-2.
- Bryant Wright (2011). Right from the Heart - A 365 Devotional. Thomas Nelson. ISBN 978-1-4041-9002-3.
- Bryant Wright (2017). The Stage Is Set: Israel, the End Times, and Christ's Ultimate Victory. Baker Books. ISBN 978-0-8010-1951-7.

== See also ==
- List of Southern Baptist Convention affiliated people
- Southern Baptist Convention
- Southern Baptist Convention Presidents

Preceded by Johnny M. Hunt	President of the Southern Baptist Convention; 2010–11	Succeeded by Fred Luter
