= Kathleen Moore Mallory =

American church worker (1879–1954)

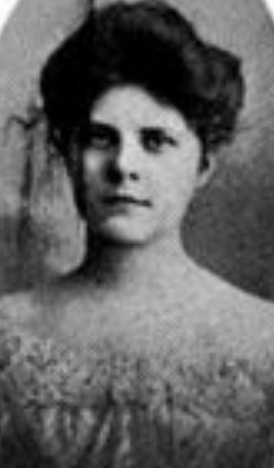
- Mallory, from the 1903 yearbook of Goucher College
- Born: January 24, 1879; Summerfield, Alabama, U.S.
- Died: July 17, 1954 (aged 75); Selma, Alabama, U.S.
- Occupations: Church worker, writer, clubwoman
- Known for: Director of the Woman's Missionary Union (1912–1948)

Kathleen Moore Mallory (January 24, 1879 – July 17, 1954) was an American writer, churchworker, and clubwoman. From 1912 to 1948, she was head of the Woman's Missionary Union (WMU), a Southern Baptist women's ministry.

== Early life and education ==
Mallory was born in Summerfield, Alabama, the daughter of Hugh Shepard Darby Mallory and Jacqueline Louisa (Lula) Moore Mallory. H.S.D. Mallory was a lawyer, bank president, railroad executive and the mayor of Selma, a candidate for governor of Alabama in 1910, and a vocal suffragist and prohibitionist. She graduated from Goucher College (then known as the Women's College of Baltimore) in 1902.

== Career ==
Mallory was a teacher and church worker in Alabama after college. She was executive secretary and executive director of the Woman's Missionary Union from 1912 to 1948. She moved WMU's headquarters from Baltimore to Birmingham in 1921. she traveled to Japan and China in 1923 and 1924, and to South America in 1930, to visit Baptist missionaries and witness the local conditions of their work first-hand. She edited WMU's magazine, Royal Service, the handbook for local chapters, and the union's annual yearbook. She retired from the executive director position in 1948, and was succeeded by Alma Hunt.

Mallory was a member of the Daughters of the American Revolution and Pi Beta Phi sorority.

== Personal life and legacy ==
Mallory was engaged to a medical student, but he died from tuberculosis in 1907, before they wed. She died in 1954, at the age of 75, in Selma. A hospital in China, a chapel in Japan, and a building in Alabama were named for her. There is a denominational offering program named for Mallory. In 1980 she was posthumously inducted into the Alabama Women's Hall of Fame.
