= Johnny Hunt =

American minister (born 1952)

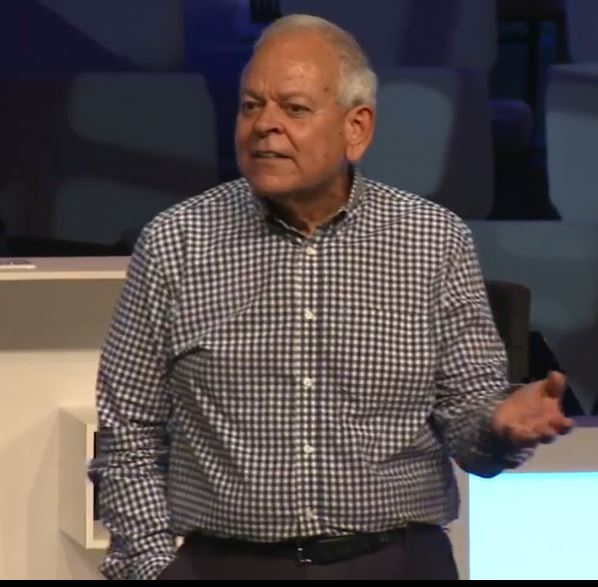
- Johnny Hunt speaking at First Baptist Arnold, Missouri.
- Born: Johnny M. Hunt; July 17, 1952 (age 74); Lumberton, North Carolina, US
- Spouse: Janet Allen Hunt
- Children: Deanna Hunt Carswell & Holly Hunt Hixson

Ecclesiastical career
- Church: Southern Baptist
- Offices held: Senior Vice President, Evangelism & Leadership, North American Mission Board; Senior Pastor, First Baptist Woodstock (1986–2019); President, Southern Baptist Convention (2008–10)

Johnny M. Hunt (born July 17, 1952) is an American evangelical Christian pastor, author, and who served as the president of the Southern Baptist Convention. He was also formerly senior pastor of First Baptist Church Woodstock, in Woodstock, Georgia. He was the first Native American president of the SBC. He previously served as the Senior Vice President of the Evangelism & Leadership division of the North American Mission Board—the church planting and domestic evangelism arm of the SBC—speaking nationally to church leaders and congregants about sharing the Christian Gospel.

== Early life ==
Hunt was born on July 17, 1952, in Lumberton, North Carolina. He is a member of the state-recognized Lumbee Tribe of North Carolina. Hunt's father left the family when he was seven. He became an alcoholic and gambler at a young age, dropping out of school at 16 and managing a pool room. Hunt experienced a radical conversion to Christianity during this time, which he details in his book, Out of the Poolroom. After his conversion, he was mentored by several men from his home church in Wilmington, North Carolina and came to the realization that God had called him to ministry. He has earned degrees from Gardner-Webb College and the Southeastern Baptist Theological Seminary, and has also received honorary doctorates from Immanuel Baptist Theological Seminary, Covington Theological Seminary, and Tennessee Temple University.

== Family ==
Hunt is married to Janet Allen Hunt of Wilmington, North Carolina. They have two daughters: Deanna Hunt Carswell and Hollie Hunt Hixson. They also have three granddaughters: Katie Carswell, Hope Hixson, and Addie Hixson. He has one grandson, Carson Carswell.

== Ministry career ==
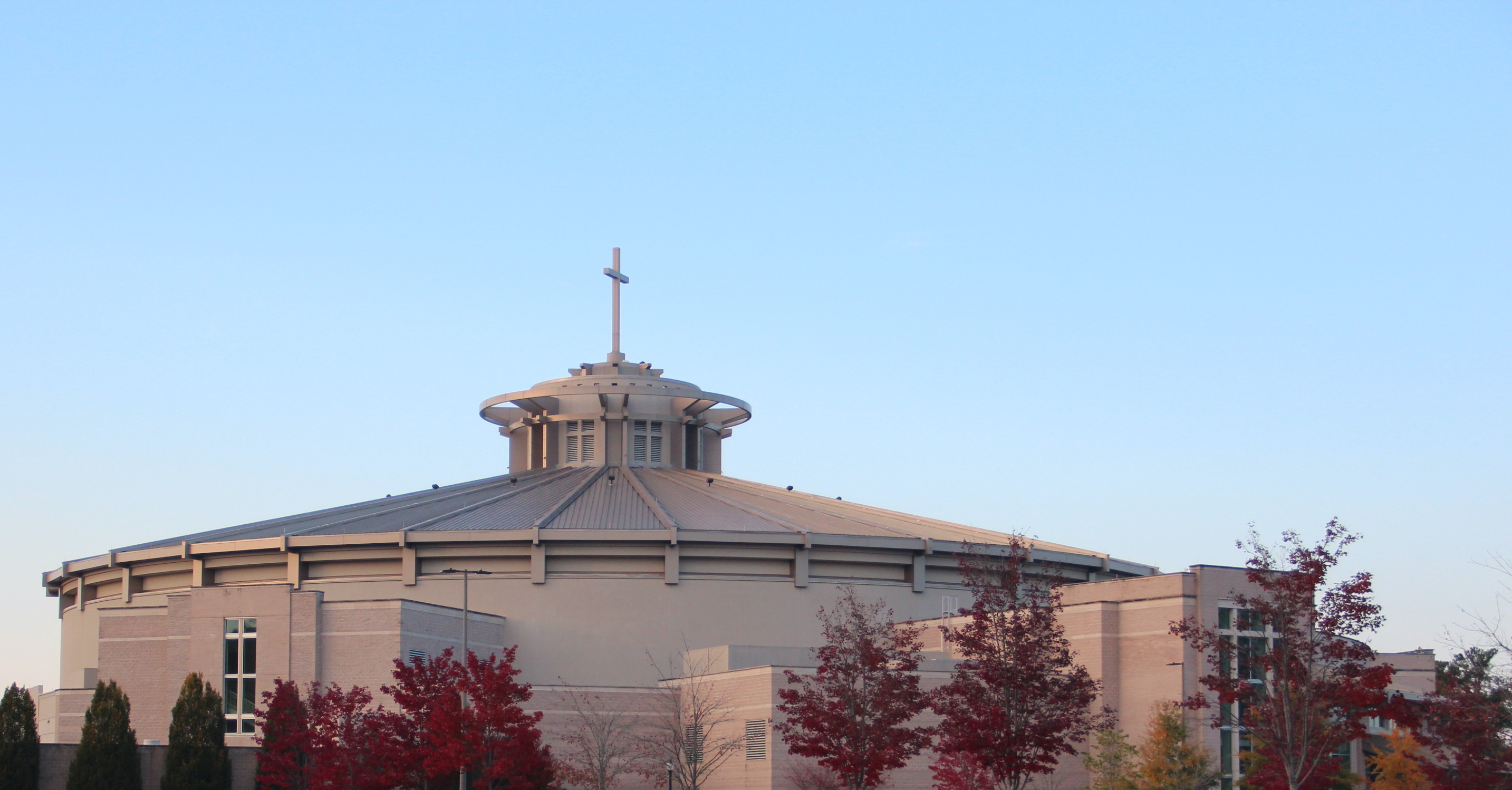
First Baptist Church, Woodstock, Georgia

Hunt has held ministry positions at Lavonia Baptist Church, Mooresboro, North Carolina (July 1976–August 1979), Falls Baptist Church in Wake Forest, North Carolina (1979–1980), Longleaf Baptist Church, Wilmington, North Carolina (May 1981–December 1, 1986), and at First Baptist Church in Woodstock, Georgia (1986 to December 2019). First Baptist Woodstock is one of the largest churches in the United States. Under his ministry the church grew from about 1,000 to more than 19,000 members.

In June 1996, Hunt was named the President of SBC Pastor's Conference. On March 11, 1997, the Johnny Hunt Chair of Biblical Preaching was established at the Southeastern Baptist Theological Seminary. In June 2008, Hunt succeeded Frank Page as president of the Southern Baptist Convention, and served in that capacity for two years. He was succeeded by Bryant Wright.

In November 2016, his church celebrated his 40 years in ministry and serving as senior pastor at First Baptist Woodstock Church for 30 years.

In August 2018, Hunt, alongside his wife Janet, announced to FBC-Woodstock that he would be transitioning out of his full-time pastoral position to fulfill a Senior VP ministry for the North American Mission Board. He stepped down after a tenure of 33 years.

== Sexual assault allegations ==
In May 2022, Hunt resigned from the North American Mission Board after a report investigating the Southern Baptist Convention's handling of sex abuse cases was released and included an accusation that he had sexually assaulted another pastor's wife in 2010 which the report found credible. Hunt denied the accusation. The Guideposts Report states: "We include this sexual assault allegation in the report because our investigators found the pastor and his wife to be credible; their report was corroborated in part by a counseling minister and three other credible witnesses; and our investigators did not find Dr. Hunt’s statements related to the sexual assault allegation to be credible." Megan Basham, however, in her 2024 book Shepherds for Sale, noted that the alleged victim and her husband "came to characterize what had happened as abuse only during trauma counseling ten years later."

== Publications ==
- Building Your Leadership Resume: Developing the Legacy that Will Outlast You. B&H Publishing Group. 2009. ISBN 978-0-8054-4964-8.
- Building Your Spiritual Resume. 3H Publishers. 2007.
- From the Poolroom to the Pulpit. Self published.
- The Deacon I Want to Be: Growing in Faith, Faithful in Service - Learner Manual. Sampson Resources. 2008. ISBN 9781933376912.
- The Deacon I Want to Be: Growing in Faith, Faithful in Service - Leader Guide. LifeWay Christian Resources. 2008. ISBN 9781933376929.
- Impact: The Student Leadership Devotional. Thomas Nelson Publishers. 2012. ISBN 9781404174283.
- The Book of Hebrews: An Archive of Exegetical Sermon Notes. 3H Publishers. 2007.
- The Book of Philippians: An Archive of Exegetical Sermon Notes. 3H Publishers. 2007.
- The Book of James: An Archive of Exegetical Sermon Notes. 3H Publishers. 2003.
- The Book of Ecclesiastes: An Archive of Exegetical Sermon Notes. 3H Publishers. 2004.
- The Book of Psalms: An Archive of Exegetical Sermon Notes.
- Pathway to Discipleship. Thomas Nelson Publishers. 2012. ISBN 978-1404174405.
- Unspoken. Harvest House Publishers. 2018. ISBN 978-0-7369-7299-4.

== See also ==
- List of Southern Baptist Convention affiliated people
- Southern Baptist Convention
- Southern Baptist Convention Presidents

Preceded by Frank S. Page	President of the Southern Baptist Convention; 2008–09	Succeeded by Bryant Wright
