= Acts2 Network =

- Address: 1000 N Randall Rd, Elgin, IL 60123
- Country: United States
- Denomination: Southern Baptist North American Mission Board SEND Network
- Website: acts2.network

History
- Founded: 2006

Acts2 Network is a network of ministries throughout the US focusing on college and youth students. The headquarters is located in Elgin, Illinois. The network's mission statement is "Launching lifelong kingdom workers from every college town."

Acts2 Network has 1800+ members, each of which engage in covocational ministry. Each member works a day job but also engages in ministry outside of their working hours. In addition, members who join the network agree to a published Way of Life, a set of 15 principles, which guide spiritual and community life for its members.

== History ==
In 1981, Paul and Rebekah Kim founded Berkland Baptist Church (BBC) in the border of Berkeley, California and Oakland, California, hence the name Berkland. They started a college ministry on the campus of UC Berkeley focusing on Korean Americans and later, Asian Americans. Then, they started to plant BBC churches around the world and ended up moving to pastor the BBC Boston church. Ed and Kelly Kang assumed leadership over the Berkeley church. In 2006, the Berkeley congregation disaffiliated from BBC, re-branding as Gracepoint. Gracepoint continued to focus on college ministry and planted collegiate-focused churches throughout the United States.

Over time, Gracepoint expanded beyond just college ministry. Gracepoint developed a robust youth ministry under the organization Area Youth Ministry (AYM). Some church plants still focused on college ministry, but some focused on youth ministry. To better reflect the changing reality, in 2023, Gracepoint changed their name to Acts2 Network. It is a network aligned by the published Way of Life rather than specific ministries. The motto changed from "An Acts 2 church in every college town" to "Launching lifelong kingdom workers from every college town." In 2025, Acts2 Network launched a training center in Elgin, IL.

== Missions ==
In 2024, Acts2 Network partnered with Reliant, a missions support agency, to send over 80 missionaries to 7 countries in Asia, each serving for a 1-year term. This marked the first time Acts2 Network expanded its ministry to countries outside of the United States. Over 200 of its members applied to be part of the 1-year program, and 80 were selected.

In 2025, Acts2 Network sent its second cohort of 1-year missionaries and expanded its one-year missionary program to include eight countries, adding one new country to its existing locations.

== Controversy ==
The church has been the subject of investigations. Journalists have documented a variety of harms, including couples forced to break up, shaming, computer usage monitoring, and overworked covocational staff members.
