= Clear Creek Baptist Bible College =

Private college in Kentucky, United States

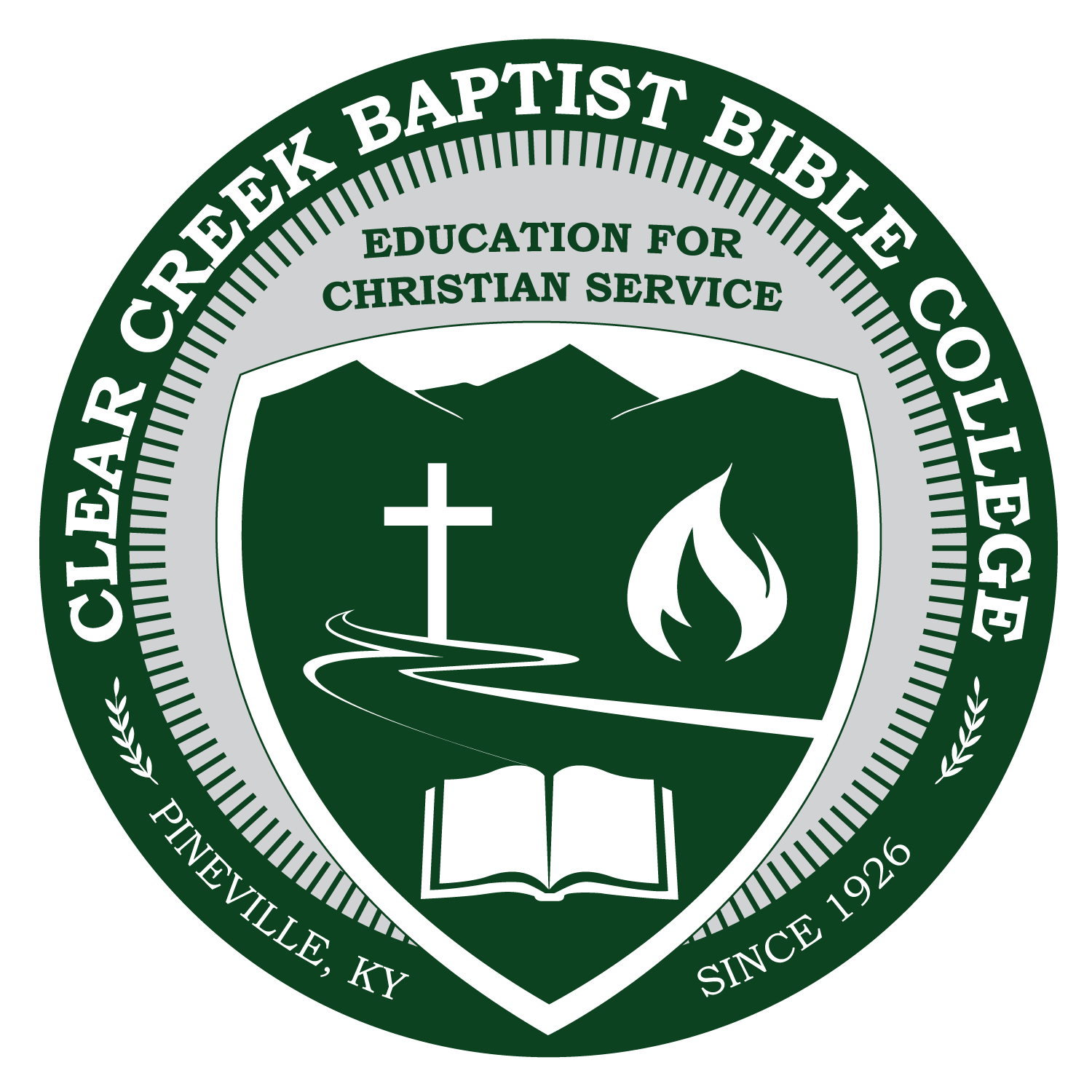
- Motto: "Education for Christian Service since 1926."
- Type: Private Bible college
- Established: 1926
- Founder: L. C. Kelly
- Religious affiliation: Kentucky Baptist Convention (Southern Baptist Convention)
- President: Charles Goodman
- Location: Pineville, Kentucky, United States; 36.7253°N 83.7276°W
- Website: www.ccbbc.edu

Clear Creek Baptist Bible College (CCBBC) is a private Baptist Bible college in Pineville, Kentucky. It is affiliated with the Kentucky Baptist Convention (Southern Baptist Convention). CCBBC provides a Bible-based education focusing on Christian service. The college is accredited by the Commission on Colleges of the Southern Association of Colleges and Schools and the Association for Biblical Higher Education. CCBBC was founded by Lloyd Caswell Kelly in 1926.

== History ==
L.C. Kelly (1874–1955) was born April 18, 1874, in Choctaw, Alabama, to Solomon and Sarah (Felt) Kelly. He became a Southern Baptist preacher at the age of 20, as he furthered his education he pastored many small country churches. He earned a four-year degree at Georgetown College in Georgetown, Kentucky. Moving to Louisville, Kentucky at the turn of the twentieth century he became the editor of the Kentucky Issue the Louisville Local newspaper. In 1907 he and Nancy Newland married in Stanford, Kentucky, at her father's home. In 1908 Rev. Kelley and his bride moved to Orlinda, Tennessee, to take the pastorate at Orlinda Baptist Church. He and Orlinda Baptist Church started an annual Bible Institution in 1908.

After 1910 the family moved to Taylor County, where Kelly began working with the Russell Creek Association of Baptist. The association ran an academy called Russell Creek Academy, which went into financial distress in 1908. Kelly aided in its reopening the school in 1914, and in 1916 began holding higher education classes; it later developed into Campbellsville University. Kelley took the pastorate of the First Baptist Church in Pineville in 1919; here he led prohibition rallies and preached against alcohol. He found a suitable location for an institution in 1924 while walking the L&N railway through a pre-civil war tunnel.

The first meeting was held in 1926, with a two-week schedule. He felt led to start an annual Bible Institute and chartered Clear Creek Mountain Springs, Inc. The institution transformed into Clear Creek Mountain Preacher School and Clear Creek Baptist School during the 1940s and 1950s. During the 1920s Clear Spring was used by the Kentucky Baptist as their Camp meeting location, as revivals were held on what is now the main campus and the athletic field. In the 1930s and 1940s RA (Royal Ambassadors) and GA (Girls in Action) camps were held for children all over Kentucky.

The campus work study program had chicken coops and farming areas, a furniture factory (making pews and pulpit furniture), and RA arrows for archery. Through the program, men and women could work and provide and study as well. In 1948 Kelly Hall was finished, which housed family and single students as well as offices and a chapel. Kelly Hall still serves today as the male dormitory and cafeteria.

D.M. Aldridge became the president in 1954 and brought the school into full-time education ministry. Four years later the school received full accreditation from the American Association of Bible Colleges.

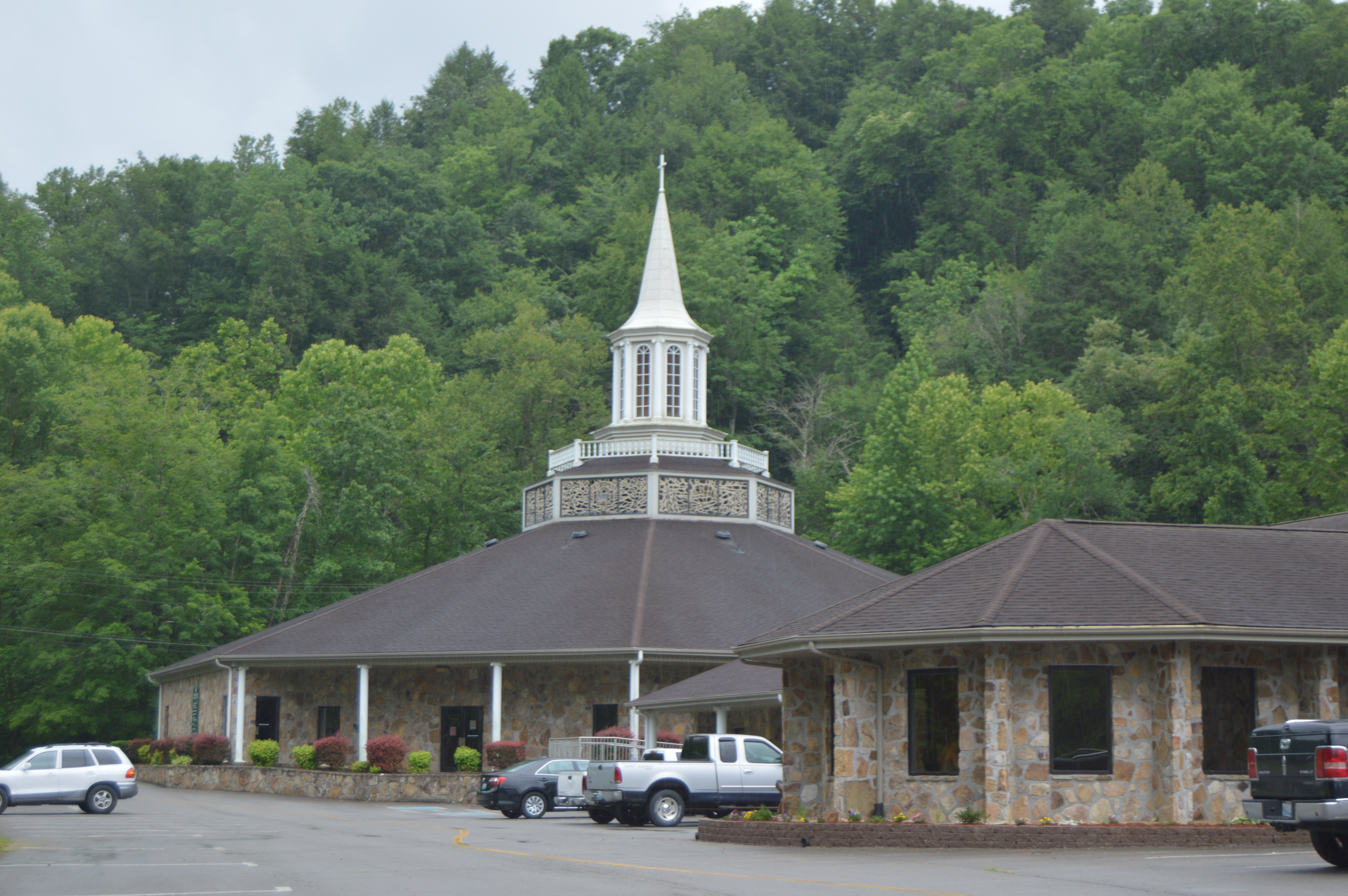
Roadside view of the campus

One of the faculty serving at that time was H. Leo Eddleman (1911–1995), who has served many of our Baptist Schools. He received his PhD from Southern Baptist Theological Seminary, after being appointed missionary to Palestine, he returned and began his professorship at New Orleans Baptist Theological Seminary. He went on to become the President of Georgetown College, and New Orleans Baptist Theological Seminary. He also was employed by the Baptist Sunday School Board. He retired from Clear Creek Baptist Bible College in 1989 and moved back to Louisville, Kentucky.

Kentucky Baptist Convention president Bill D. Whitaker became the college's fourth president in 1988. During his tenure, the school became debt-free and constructed a new education center, now known as the Bill D. Whitaker Class Room Building. Donnie Fox replaced Whitaker as president in 2007. In 2020, Clear Creek released their Master of Arts in Ministry program as "a competency based degree program built on 10 competencies and correlating in intensity to other graduate ministry degrees yielding 30 credit hours." On January 1, 2023, Charles Goodman became the new president of Clear Creek Baptist Bible College.

=== Presidents ===
- 1926–1954: Lloyd C. Kelly
- 1954–1982: Dennis M. Aldridge
- 1982–1988: Leon D. Simpson
- 1988–2007: Bill D. Whittaker
- 2007–2022: Donald S. Fox
- 2022–present: Charles Goodman

== Academics ==
The college offers certificate programs, an Associate in Arts program, Bachelor's of Arts programs, and a Master of Arts program.

== Religious affiliation ==
Clear Creek Baptist Bible College is affiliated with the Kentucky Baptist Convention of the Southern Baptist Convention.
