= Sexual abuse cases in Southern Baptist churches =

Sexual abuse cases in the United States

Widespread sexual abuse cases in Southern Baptist churches were reported by the Houston Chronicle and San Antonio Express-News on February 10, 2019. The report found roughly 380 clergy, lay leaders and volunteers had faced allegations of sexual misconduct, leaving behind over 700 victims since 1998. The extent of misconduct is further complicated by work within the Southern Baptist Convention to move sex offenders to other communities and resist attempts to address the culture of abuse.

== Background ==
Allegations of sexual misconduct are not a new development within the Southern Baptist Convention. An investigative report determined that the Baptist leadership would cover up allegations and move offenders to other communities, all while facing some of their own allegations of indecency. The report by the Chronicle and Express-News said that at least ten Southern Baptist churches welcomed pastors, ministers and volunteers who had been charged with sexual misconduct, many of whom were registered sex offenders. Pastors Leslie Mason, Michael Lee Jones and Joseph S. Ratliff all continued to work as religious figures after allegations of sexual misconduct. Darrell Gilyard, who received multiple allegations of sexual assault, served three years in prison for child molestation before returning to the pulpit at Christ Tabernacle Baptist Church in Jacksonville, Florida.

Mark Aderholt was credibly accused of sexually assaulting sixteen-year-old Anne Marie Miller when he was a student at Southwestern Baptist Theological Seminary. The investigating entity, the International Mission Board of the SBC allowed Aderholt to resign and over the next eleven years, he continued pastoring in large churches in Arkansas listing references from the International Mission Board on his resume. In 2016, he took an executive position at the South Carolina Southern Baptist Convention where he resigned shortly after he was arrested on four felony counts of sexual abuse. Aderholt's arrest sparked a cascade of external independent examinations in the Southern Baptist Convention.

Paul Pressler, former vice president of the Southern Baptist Convention, was accused by Toby Twining and Brooks Schott of sexual misconduct in separate court affidavits. Both men said Pressler molested or solicited them for sex. The accusations were filed as part of a lawsuit filed in 2017 by Gareld Duane Rollins Jr. claiming he was regularly raped by the Conservative leader. Rollins met Pressler in high school and was part of a Bible study Pressler led. Rollins claims he was raped two to three times a month while at Pressler's home. According to the Chronicle, Pressler agreed in 2004 to pay $450,000 to Rollins for physical assault. The SBC settled the Rollins case out of court in December 2023.

In the 2018 Chronicle report, Toby Twining was a teenager in 1977 when Pressler grabbed his penis in a sauna at Houston's River Oaks Country Club. Pressler was a youth pastor at Bethel Church in Houston but was ousted in 1978 after church officials received information about "an alleged incident". Attorney Brooks Schott also stated in an affidavit that he resigned his position at Pressler's former law firm after Pressler invited him to get into a hot tub with him naked. Brooks also accused Jared Woodfill, Pressler's longtime law partner who from 2002 to 2014 was chairman of the Harris County Republican Party, of failing to prevent Pressler's sexual advances toward him and others claiming his indiscretions were well known at the firm.

Former SBC president Paige Patterson has also been accused on multiple occasions of covering up abuse. Patterson was accused of ignoring the claims of sexual assault from Pastor Darrell Gilyard, who was later jailed for multiple accounts of child sexual abuse. Patterson was named in the lawsuit against Paul Pressler for helping Pressler cover up the abuse. Patterson was removed from his position as President of Southwestern Baptist Theological Seminary after wanting to meet with a rape survivor so he could "break her down".

On May 22, 2022, Johnny Hunt, the longtime pastor of First Baptist Church of Woodstock, Georgia and a former Southern Baptist Convention president who was serving as a member of the North American Mission Board, resigned from the North American Mission Board after the Guidepost report on sexual abuse in the SBC included an allegation that Hunt had sexually assaulted the wife of another pastor in 2010.

Some survivors of sexual assault were asked to get abortions for children that were conceived during encounters with clergy, a policy that runs contrary to established Southern Baptist dogma on the issue. Many were shunned from their communities.

=== Attempts at reform ===
In 2006, clergy abuse survivor Christa Brown first began publicly urging SBC officials to implement a nationwide strategy to address the denomination's safety gaps and prevent credibly accused pastors from moving from church to church. Together with the Survivors Network of those Abused by Priests, Brown advocated for the creation of an independent review board to investigate SBC abuse reports and for a centralized system for record-keeping and information-sharing on credibly accused clergy sex abusers. "Almost as soon as Brown began advocating for a national SBC database of abusers, some SBC leaders pushed back against her efforts.” At a site called Stop Baptist Predators, Brown began keeping her own database, using public records to eventually compile 170 names of credibly accused SBC abusers.

In response to Brown's request, Wade Burleson, a prominent Southern Baptist leader in Oklahoma called for a database of sexual predators within the denomination multiple times. In 2007, Burleson recommended the creation of a database to track sexually abusive ministers. The executive committee of the Southern Baptist Convention eventually denied Burleson's motion, stating that it would be impossible to ensure that all convicted sexual predators who ever had a connection with a Baptist church would be included in such a database. Time magazine reported that the denial of Burleson's motion was one of "The 10 Most Under-Reported National Stories of 2008".

In 2018, Burleson again proposed at the annual Southern Baptist Convention that the Convention establish a predator database. In response to the motion, new SBC President J.D. Greear and the Southern Baptist Convention's executive committee announced the formation of a Sexual Abuse Presidential Study Group. The working group will "consider how Southern Baptists at every level can take discernible action to respond swiftly and compassionately to incidents of abuse." It will also make recommendations for creating safe environments in churches and institutions.

As part of the Chronicle's report, investigative reporter Robert Downen interviewed Burleson about his database proposal being rejected by SBC leaders, quoting Burleson as saying, "There's a known problem, but it's too messy to deal with. It's not that we can't do it as much as we don't want to do it. ... To me, that's a problem. You must want to do it, to do it."

One of the key internal issues that the leadership of the Southern Baptist Convention point to in their inability to address allegations of sexual misconduct is the principle of local church autonomy. Unlike other Christian denominations, the SBC does not nationally ordain or license clergy; only individual congregations have that authority (which includes the authority to revoke such). As such, the national office has no authority to force churches to report or register sexual misconduct or to revoke licensure or ordination of a guilty party (the only action that the national office can take is to disfellowship a congregation). When Burleson lobbied for the creation of a sex-offender database within the denomination, the executive committee said Burleson's recommendation would violate the autonomy of Southern Baptist churches, stating the convention does not have any authority to require local churches to report instances of alleged sexual abuse to their local association, the state Baptist convention, or the national convention.

An additional issue revolves around local autonomy and clergy themselves. "Most pastors are ordained locally after they've convinced a small group of church elders that they've been called to service by God," which leads to a lack of oversight into the background of figures who are ordained. "It's a porous sieve of a denomination," said Christa Brown, who was one of the most vocal advocates for a database, repeatedly spelling out how it could deter predators without sacrificing local church autonomy.

In 2022, Joseph Thomas Knott, a member of the Southern Baptist Convention's executive committee, spoke out against reforms during a committee meeting, arguing that preventative steps to end abuse, in order to protect women and children, would ruin the Baptist church and open the convention up to potential liability lawsuits.

==== Resolution passed ====
On June 12, 2019, during their annual meeting, SBC delegates, who assembled that year in Birmingham, Alabama, approved a resolution condemning sex abuse and establishing a special committee to investigate sex abuse, which will make it easier for SBC churches to be expelled from the convention. The Rev. J. D. Greear, president of the Southern Baptist Convention and pastor of The Summit Church in Durham, North Carolina, called the move a "defining moment". Ronnie Floyd, president of the SBC's executive committee, echoed Greear's remarks, describing the vote as "a very, very significant moment in the history of the Southern Baptist Convention."

== Methodology ==
Reporters Robert Downen, Lise Olsen and John Tedesco began their work on this story in 2018, searching news archives, websites and sex offender databases to compile an archival list of sexual abuse and misconduct allegations. The reporters confined their research focus to the ten years preceding the first call by victims for a registry in 2007 and the ten years after that call. After examining hundreds of court records and testimony from over 20 states, the results found 380 credibly accused figures within Southern Baptist-affiliated churches. Of these cases, about "220 had been convicted of sex crimes or received deferred prosecutions in plea deals and sent letters to all of them soliciting their responses to summaries we compiled. We received written responses from more than 30 and interviewed three in Texas prisons. Of the 220, more than 90 remain in prison and another 100 are still registered sex offenders."

== 2022 report ==
On May 22, 2022, a 209-page report was released by Guidepost Solutions, an independent firm contracted by the SBC's executive committee, detailing that SBC leaders had stonewalled and disparaged clergy sex abuse survivors for nearly two decades. It also listed the named cases that involved the admission, confession, guilty plea, conviction, judgement, sentencing and registered sex offenders. It did not include cases that did not relate to sexual abuse nor cases that ended in acquittal. The report listed more than 700 entries within the parameters. Some of the information in the report has been redacted to protect minors and others indicated in the report that are deemed innocent.

The report also stated that known abusers were allowed to keep their positions without informing their current church or congregation. Following the report, SBC President Ed Litton urged the organization "to take deliberate action to address these failures and chart a new course" and executive committee leaders pledged to eliminate sex abuse within the SBC.

== Response ==
Leadership within the Southern Baptist Convention quickly responded to the Chronicle report. J. D. Greear, then president of the convention, described the abuses as "pure evil" and called for "pervasive change" within the denomination, including cooperation with local authorities on investigations and support for survivors. Greear also admitted the denomination's failure in listening to victims and addressing their concerns. Russell D. Moore, president of the Ethics & Religious Liberty Commission within the denomination, called the allegations "alarming and scandalous", saying that "nothing is worse than the use of the name of Jesus to prey on the vulnerable, or to use the name of Jesus to cover up such crimes". Moore called out the policy of local church autonomy, saying in a blog post on his website that "church autonomy is no excuse for a lack of accountability". Moore announced the convention's "Sexual Abuse Presidential Study Group, assigned with investigating all options and reviewing what other denominations and groups have done to keep track of abuses, while hearing from law enforcement, psychological and psychiatric experts, survivors, and many others".

Sexual abuse survivors and advocates responded quickly to the report. Stating that she had little patience for SBC officials acting as though the report’s findings were a surprise, Christa Brown said: “They have known about this. They have known for years…They have held to a devil’s bargain of choosing institutional protection over the protection of children.” Similarly, Rachael Denhollander, one of the whistleblowers on the USA Gymnastics sex abuse scandal tweeted expressing no shock at the allegations. "The worst part is that we have known for years... no one wanted to listen. It did not matter enough to investigate and act" she wrote. Tarana Burke, founder of the MeToo movement, and actor Terry Crews publicized the findings on their Twitter accounts.

In August 2022, the SBC announced that it was under investigation by the U.S. Department of Justice on matters related to clergy sex abuse. The DOJ closed its investigation in 2025.

== Legacy ==
While membership in the Southern Baptist Convention has been declining since 2007, the denomination has lost 1.5 million members since 2018 and as of 2023 is currently at its lowest membership level since the late 1970s. LifeWay Research, the church-affiliated publishing company which authored the annual population study on the church, suggested in their report that much of this decline was due to people who had left the church years ago being removed from membership rolls, a reflection of better record-keeping. External media attributed some of this decline to the COVID-19 pandemic and deaths of older congregants, many reports on the decline have mentioned the ongoing sex abuse cases as an additional cause for the decline.

== See also ==
- Catholic Church sexual abuse cases
