= Walnut Street Baptist Church (Louisville, Kentucky) =

Coordinates: 38°14′12.4″N 85°45′26.8″W

Walnut Street Baptist Church in Louisville, Kentucky

Walnut Street Baptist Church is a Southern Baptist, Christian former megachurch in Louisville, Kentucky. It is associated with the Southern Baptist Convention, Kentucky Baptist Convention, and the Long Run Baptist Association.

== History ==
Walnut Street Baptist Church was founded in 1815 as the First Baptist Church in Louisville, Kentucky. In the beginning, the congregation had 18 members who met primarily in their homes. The congregation served the Louisville community for 30 years as First Baptist Church.

In 1845 the First and Second Baptist churches called the same pastor and the two congregations merged and built a facility on the corner of Fourth and Walnut Street (now called Muhammad Ali Boulevard) in Louisville. The newly merged congregation's sanctuary could seat 600. It remained in that location until 1902. It was decided to move as the congregation had outgrown its facility with Sunday school attendance topping 1000.

At that time Walnut Street Baptist Church was moved to its present location on the corner of Third and Saint Catherine streets in what is now Old Louisville. By this time it was considered by some to be the largest church in the South. As the 20th century progressed the church grew to encompass over two city blocks. By the 1960s the congregation was responsible for starting directly or indirectly 78 churches in the Long Run Association encompassing the Louisville area.

In the 1970s and 1980s, this racially diverse downtown congregation stayed in its location despite over two-thirds of the congregation living outside the downtown corridor. Expanded inner-city and activities ministries were added at this time to adapt to urban ministry in the latter part of the century. Peak attendance in this period exceeded 3,500 in Sunday School and weekly worship.

The 1970s also saw the beginning of the living Christmas tree which continued until 2006. This annual "gift to the city" of choral and instrumental performance was free and drew on average 35,000 to its 16 performances at its peak.

In the 1990s the congregation recommitted itself to its downtown philosophy by undertaking a multimillion-dollar campus update. Today the congregation has active ministries including a retirement home, subsidized apartments, a counseling center, weekly worship, Christian education, Christian social ministry, global mission partnerships, and recreational activities, and sustains a membership of over 2,500. Current weekly attendance is about 350.
