= Alma Hunt (Baptist leader) =

American Baptist leader (1909–2008)

Alma Hunt (October 5, 1909 – June 14, 2008) was executive secretary of the Southern Baptist Convention Woman's Missionary Union from 1948 to 1974.

Hunt was born in Roanoke, Virginia. She was an ordained minister of the Rosalind Hills Baptist Church where she vocally opposed the Southern Baptist Convention's prohibition of women in the role of church pastors or military and prison chaplains.

Hunt graduated in 1941 from State Teacher's College (now Longwood University) in Farmville, Virginia; in 1947, she earned a master's degree in administration at Columbia University. William Jewell College, where she served as dean of women in 1945–48, awarded her an honorary doctorate of humanities, and in 1999 the University of Richmond awarded her an honorary doctorate of divinity.

One of Hunt's first initiatives after being chosen to head the WMU was to support the formation of the women's department of the Baptist World Alliance, and also the BWA's interdenominational North American Baptist Women's Union. She served as president of the latter in 1964–67, and vice president of the former in 1970–75.

From 1976 to 1985, Hunt served as consultant on women's mission work for the Baptist Foreign Mission Board which named her an honorary emeritus missionary in 1987.

== Legacy ==
In 1998, the WMU of Virginia and the Baptist General Association of Virginia named the Alma Hunt Offering for Virginia Missions in her honor. In 2023 the Alma Hunt Offering distributed £500,000 to WMUV, mainly to missions and ministry.

Several facilities have been named in her honor, including: the Alma Hunt Museum at WMU headquarters in Birmingham, Alabama, which houses her personal missions archives; the Alma Hunt Library at the John Leland Center for Theological Studies in Northern Virginia; the Hunt Hall at CrossRoads Camp & Conference Center in Lowesville, Virginia; and the Alma Hunt Cottage at Hope Tree Family Services (formerly known as the Virginia Baptist Children's Home) in Salem, Virginia.
