= WRVG-LP =

Radio station at Georgetown College in Georgetown, Kentucky

- Georgetown, Kentucky; United States
- Frequency: 93.7 MHz
- Branding: The Voice

Programming
- Format: Top 40 (day); Oldies (overnight)
- Affiliations: Kentucky News Network

Ownership
- Owner: Georgetown College; (Georgetown College)

History
- First air date: November 19, 1963
- Former call signs: WGTC
- Call sign meaning: Radio Voice of Georgetown

Technical information
- Licensing authority: FCC
- Facility ID: 134608
- Class: L1
- ERP: 100 watts
- HAAT: 9.5 meters (31 ft)
- Transmitter coordinates: 38°12′27″N 84°33′14″W

Links
- Public license information: LMS
- Webcast: wrvg.radio12345.com
- Website: wrvg.georgetowncollege.edu

WRVG-LP (93.7 FM) is an American low-power FM radio station licensed to serve the community of Georgetown, Kentucky. The station is owned by Georgetown College.

== History ==
WRVG was preceded by an AM station called WGTC. Lane Wells, the first faculty advisor of WRVG, served as the student Station Manager of WGTC during the 1958–1959 school year. During that time, the WGTC studio was located on the first floor of Giddings Hall. Later, when Wells returned as a professor, the station was relocated to the attic of Giddings. When the school applied for the license for the new FM station, they wanted to keep the WGTC call letters; but they were already in use by a commercial station. So instead, they chose the call letters WRVG, for the Radio Voice of Georgetown.

WRVG, Georgetown College's campus radio station, came from humble beginnings. The weak 10 watt station was located in the Religious Education building where the current Ensor Learning Resource Center now stands. The faint signal did not discourage devoted broadcasting students and many of them would stay in the radio station all day. The students wished for a more powerful station that would allow more opportunities for Georgetown College and its students in the broadcasting world.

WRVG came on air for the first time on Tuesday, November 19, 1963, at 4PM, and stayed on air for two hours. Three days later, JFK was assassinated. Lane Wells remembered, "I was putting in an air monitor...a Heathkit I bought, built and installed atop the control room rack cabinet. I cried."

WRVG was only the fourth educational FM station to come on the air in the state of Kentucky. The station's first console held the Gates Radio Company consolette. Lane Wells built the platform console in the college's shop the summer of 1963. He installed the two turntables atop the platform, wired it with various mics, recorders, etc.

President Robert Mills budgeted Wells $10,000 from a Shell Oil Company grant to build WRVG.

The first transmitter was a hand-me-down 10-watter from Depauw University. Wells recalled, "I'll never forget riding up to Greencastle, Indiana from Georgetown's air field. The owner-operator, Bob Johnson of WAXU [formerly WGOR, downtown], and I flew up in Bob's light plane to see it. We had to sweep snow off of its wings...I prayed."

Bob Johnson was instrumental in helping to get WRVG on the air. The first student Station Manager, Rick Leigh, who later joined the college faculty and taught broadcasting courses utilizing the station as a lab, drove up to Depauw and brought it home...it weighed "tons" in comparison to today's transmitters. In 1983, WRVG took another big step by hiring the first student Sport Director and play-by-play announcer for Tiger Athletics. Steven Hamilton, from Glasgow, Kentucky, became the first "Voice of the Tigers" and led a two-person broadcasting team airing the school's first college football game live. The programming successes of this newly formed sports media team led to not only live coverage of the entire 1983 football season, but the addition of live coverage of men's basketball games that same year; another first for WRVG 89.9 FM.

In 1997, Dr. William Gillespie, professor, and then advisor for the campus station, contacted a broadcasting engineer to see if it would be possible to increase the station's signal strength. The engineer researched the question and found, to everyone's surprise, that the station's signal could be increased to 50,000 watts, making it an FM superstation in central Kentucky. The college considered the opportunity and decided to increase the station's signal strength. A tower was built on the limestone rich land on East Campus near the baseball field, and plans were developed to expand the station's programming to a professional, 24/7 broadcast operation.

The powerful new station, 89.9 WRVG-FM, had one of the clearest signals in the southern part of the United States, as there were no other stations in the region sharing that frequency. And since the station would be on the air continuously, a full-time staff was needed who would be able to support the programming schedule when students would be away for summer break and over holidays. A professional staff of twenty was hired, including programming director Tom Martin, a respected national radio broadcaster, on-air hosts Jerry Gerard and Laura Shine, well-known music gurus in the radio world, Jon Bowne of JB's Home Cookin', and newscaster Susan Marshall, now morning anchor on National Public Radio. Dr. Gillespie was the station's general manager.

To ensure a solid and diverse, 24-hour-a-day, seven days a week, programming schedule, WRVG launched the World Radio Network and sought programs produced by other college radio stations and by public radio stations around the country. Stations were given the opportunity to send to World Radio their best programs and, in return, take whatever shows they wanted in the programming pool for their broadcast schedules. Over 220 stations participated, allowing public radio programs from the World Radio service to be broadcast by stations all over the country, while providing WRVG with exciting programs to fill out its lineup. Georgetown College's WRVG radio programming and its World Radio programming service became a hit locally and nationally.

WRVG offered so much to a wide audience. The station, with its programming motto, "Free the Music!" played mostly jazz and blues, and produced a number of extremely popular news and information programs, including an award-winning poetry program hosted by GC alumnus Troy Teegarden. ACE magazine readers voted WRVG as the best radio station and JB's Home Cookin as the best DJ in Lexington, and because of Georgetown's convenient location on the crossroads of I-64 and I-75, bands from all over would stop by the station to play live in WRVG's performance studio.

In 2003, with a significant downturn in the national economy, the college was compelled to sell the 50,000 watt station. Even though the station was an asset, some administrators and trustees believed that selling the station would be more beneficial for the college in the long term. WRVG-FM was sold for $2.7 million, and the World Radio programming service was discontinued. The 89.9 frequency in Lexington, and the tower on the college's east campus, is now in use by the K-LOVE radio network. Still the memory of a great radio station, WRVG- the Radio Voice of Georgetown, survives. WRVG bumper stickers can still be seen occasionally while driving around Lexington.

In 2004, Dr. Jason Phillips came to Georgetown College and took over the role of WRVG's faculty advisor. It was under his direction that a new low-powered station was created. He oversaw the construction of a new tower and antenna on top of the Cralle Student Center. Dr. Phillip's experience and knowledge of how to run a radio station was crucial, since the FCC's deadline for the re-launch of the new WRVG was May 2005. The station was able to keep the WRVG call letters but moved to frequency 93.7 FM.

Dr. Phillips also began teaching a new class entitled Introduction to Broadcasting, which allowed students the chance to have hands-on experience working in radio. This class also allowed the station to train underclassman who would eventually go on to become full staff members at the station. During the 2007–2008 school year, the studio was completely refurbished. This was made possible in part by the donation of equipment from a Georgetown College alumni. WRVG's expansion includes more live, local content created by students and the introduction of new media such as the internet. Live streaming began officially at 7 PM on October 2, 2008. This technology allows the station to obtain a greater audience that terrestrial radio cannot reach.

During the 2008–2009 school year, WRVG continued to make improvements. Some of the highlights of the year included the broadcast of George H.W. Bush's visit to the campus and naming ceremony of the recreation center. WRVG also covered the 2008 election, reporting on events at the national, state and local level. The coverage featured a political panel, state by state presidential returns and results of local Georgetown races with live reports from the courthouse. This was the first time since the rebirth of the station that WRVG covered an election. WRVG also had a special Derby Show that covered the current odds on horses and included special reports including a montage of previous Derby calls. Other regularly scheduled shows included: The Big Picture with Jordan Rowe, GC on the Air with Chris Young and GC Songbook with Elizabeth Cleary.

The year also saw the creation of WRVG Productions: the video production unit of WRVG. The first production was shot during the spring of 2009. It was a five-part original web series titled The Freshmen and was written and produced by WRVG advisor Jason Phillips. The web series debuted in the fall of 2009. This venture is a part of WRVG.s goals to expand into new media forms.

The station not only benefits students who are directly involved with the station, but it also serves the college community as a whole by providing necessary news, as well as information that is crucial for the day-to-day operations of the school. The radio station is also a way in which alumni and parents can keep in contact with the college.

Former logo
