= Christa Brown =

Clergy abuse survivor advocate

- Occupations: Lawyer, author
- Known for: Surviving sexual abuse
- Notable work: Baptistland: A Memoir of Abuse, Betrayal, and Transformation
- Website: christabrown.me

Christa Brown is an American retired appellate lawyer, survivor, and author known for her advocacy related to clergy sexual abuse within the Southern Baptist Convention (SBC). She is the author of the memoirs This Little Light and Baptistland. Brown has been featured in major national and regional journalism addressing the handling of sexual abuse cases in Southern Baptist churches and has appeared as an interviewee in the documentary film For Our Daughters.

== Story of abuse ==
As a teenager at a Baptist church in Farmers Branch, Texas, Brown experienced sexual abuse by a male youth group pastor, including verbal grooming through the use of religious language and escalating sexual contact over a period of months. Brown states that when she eventually disclosed the abuse, church leaders failed to report the minister or warn other congregations.

== Advocacy ==
Brown has engaged in decades-long advocacy for reform. ABC News's 20/20 featured Brown's advocacy in a 2007 exposé on clergy sex abuse in Protestant churches, including the SBC. She was one of the survivors who were featured in the Houston Chronicle's 2019 multi-part investigative series that documented allegations of decades of abuse by 380 pastors, teachers, deacons, and volunteers and examined how denominational structures and leadership responded to reports of misconduct. There are records of the historical correspondence regarding Brown's abuse between Brown, her attorney, and the leadership of the Baptist General Convention of Texas and the SBC in the Guideposts Solutions Report of 2022, a story that was also covered by the New York Times. Ms. Magazine, and again in the Houston Chronicle, though as an interview of Brown, as well as a timeline of the SBC abuse crisis by Religion News Service. The Religion News Association named Brown as one of the top religion newsmakers of the year in 2022 based on how her "advocacy for fellow survivors of sexual abuse helped force a reckoning" regarding the SBC's history of mishandling cases of sexually abusive ministers.

== Southern Baptist Convention abuse reporting and offender database controversy ==
In 2006, Brown, joined by leaders of Survivors Network of Those Abused by Priests (SNAP), first proposed that the SBC create a centralized system for record-keeping and information-sharing on credibly accused clergy sex abusers. In the years that followed, the SBC denied it could maintain its own list, citing the fact that denominational churches govern independently. Yet according to the Guideposts Solutions 2022 report, there was a staffer in the office of Augie Boto, then vice president of the SBC's executive committee, who had compiled a list of "Baptist leaders who had been arrested or were the subject of civil suits concerning sex crimes against minors spanning back to roughly 1960." Eventually, the SBC released a list on May 26, 2022, sixteen years after Brown sounded the alarm that the SBC should keep such a list. However, Brown has criticized the SBC, stating that the offender database has not been maintained as an ongoing public database and has been abandoned. Brown has stated that any database might be ineffective unless it is run by outsiders, that "It has to be independently administered to provide survivors with a safe place to report."

== Documentary film ==
Brown appeared as an interviewee in the documentary film For Our Daughters, produced by historian and author Kristin Kobes Du Mez. In interviews with survivors, journalists, and scholars, the film examines sexual abuse, individual impact, and institutional accountability within Christian organizations.

== Commentary writing on institutional accountability ==
In addition to her books, Brown has written commentary on religion, abuse, and accountability for Baptist News Global as well as Ms. Magazine. Her opinion writing has focused on survivor perspectives and critiques of denominational responses to abuse allegations.

== Books ==
- This Little Light: Beyond a Baptist Preacher Predator and His Gang. Grand Rapids, MI: Lake Drive Books, 2009.
- Baptistland: A Memoir of Abuse, Betrayal, and Transformation. Grand Rapids MI: Lake Drive Books, 2024.
