= Mike Polly =

American football player and coach (born 1983)

Current position
- Title: Assistant offensive line coach
- Team: Florida
- Conference: SEC

Biographical details
- Born: November 10, 1983 (age 42); Erlanger, Kentucky, U.S.
- Education: Georgetown College; Middle Tennessee State University

Playing career
- 2002–2006: Georgetown
- Position: Offensive line

Coaching career (HC unless noted)
- 2007 (Spring): Georgetown (GA)
- 2007–2009: Middle Tennessee (GA)
- 2010: Murray State (OT/TE)
- 2011–2012: Murray State (STC/OL)
- 2013: Middle Tennessee (RB)
- 2014–2015: Middle Tennessee (STC/RB)
- 2016–2021: Middle Tennessee (STC/OT/TE)
- 2022–2023: Middle Tennessee (RGC/OL)
- 2025: Georgia Tech (AOL)
- 2026–present: Florida (AOL)

Mike Polly (born November 10, 1983) is an American football coach and former player. He is currently an assistant offensive line coach at the Florida Gators. Polly has also coached at Georgetown College and Murray State University.

== Coaching career ==
=== Graduate Assistant ===
Following Polly's playing career, He joined the coaching staff at his alma mater, Georgetown for the spring of 2007. He assisted with the offensive line and strength and conditioning. In the fall, Polly joined the coaching staff at Middle Tennessee as a graduate assistant working with the offensive line. He held this position through the 2009 season.

=== Murray State ===
From 2010 to 2012, Polly was a member of the Murray State football staff. He joined the staff coaching the tight ends and offensive tackles in 2010, and then for the 2011 and 2012 seasons, Polly was responsible for the whole offensive line, as well as being the special teams coordinator. In each season he was there, Murray State's offense ranked in the top 5 nationally. Polly's offensive line's success led the school's first 1,000 yard rusher.

=== Middle Tennessee ===
In 2013, Polly returned to Middle Tennessee to coach the running backs. Prior to the 2014 season, Polly took over as the special teams coordinator, while still coaching the running backs. For the 2016 season, Polly moved back to his roots, coaching the tackles and tight ends, while continuing in his role as the special teams coordinator. Polly has also served as the run game coordinator for the program. After an offensive reshuffling in the offseason after the 2021 season, Polly took over the entire offensive line. Following the 2023 season, head coach Rick Stockstill was let go, and Polly was not retained by new head coach Derek Mason.

=== Georgia Tech ===
On January 24, 2025, Polly was hired as an assistant offensive line coach at Georgia Tech.

== Playing career ==
Polly was an all-conference player as a senior at Georgetown College as well as a co-captain. He helped lead his teams to four straight Mid-South Conference titles. Academically, Polly had great success as well. He was academic all-conference four times, and academic all-American three times.

== Personal life ==
Polly earned his degree in marketing from Georgetown in 2006, and a Master's in Sports Management from Middle Tennessee in 2008.
