= Sunrise Children's Services =

Children's services provider in Kentucky, US

- Formation: 1869
- Founder: Walnut Street Baptist Church
- Founded at: Louisville, Kentucky
- Type: Non-profit organization
- Legal status: 501(c)(3) organization
- Location: United States
- Region served: Kentucky
- President: Dale Suttles
- Affiliations: Kentucky Baptist Convention
- Website: sunrise.org
- Formerly called: Louisville Baptist Orphan's Home; Baptist Children's Homes; Kentucky Baptist Homes for Children

Sunrise Children's Services (or Sunrise) is a nonprofit organization based in Kentucky. It is the state's largest provider of services to children in crisis. Its services include providing homes to abused, abandoned, or neglected children. Sunrise is owned and operated by the Kentucky Baptist Convention. Sunrise has previously been known as Louisville Baptist Orphan's Home, Baptist Children's Homes, and Kentucky Baptist Homes for Children.

== Work ==
Sunrise Children's Services is a licensed behavioral health organization with locations in Danville, Dixon, Elizabethtown, Mayfield, Morehead, Bronston, and Mount Washington. The organization maintains a "covenant agreement" with the Kentucky Baptist Convention that requires, among other things, that the agency "shall maintain its distinctive Baptist character". Members of the organization's board of directors are selected by the convention.

In 2018, Sunrise officials estimated that the organization served approximately 1,200 people in all 120 Kentucky counties. As of 2018, Sunrise holds the highest levels of accreditation from The Joint Commission, the Better Business Bureau, and other professional organizations. Sunrise provides training and support to foster parents. The Kentucky Baptist Convention is waging initiatives to support Sunrise, including adopting foster care families in each of the Baptist churches.

== History ==
=== Early history ===
Sunrise Children's Services was founded as Louisville Baptist Orphan's Home in 1869 by a group of women at Walnut Street Baptist Church in Louisville, Kentucky. It would later be known as Baptist Children's Homes and Kentucky Baptist Homes for Children. Sunrise's purpose was to house and care for children orphaned as a result of the American Civil War and its aftermath. The original facility moved to a 20-acre (0.081 km^{2}) campus in Middletown, Kentucky, and was named Spring Meadows Children's Home.

In the early 1900s, the Baptist Educational Society of Kentucky purchased the former Lynnland Military Institute (which closed in 1879) in Hardin County and opened the Glen Dale Children's Home on the property in 1915. The facility closed in 2009, and operations were moved to consolidate all of the agency's operations under one roof at a new location elsewhere in the county.

In 1956, Pine Crest Children's Home opened in Morehead. In 1978, Sunrise secured a contract with the state of Kentucky to care for wards of the state. In 1980, Kentucky Baptist offered more counseling services, opened residential centers in Dixon and Morehead, and opened an emergency shelter in Elizabethtown.

=== Modern day ===
In March 2007, Sunrise adopted its present name, changing from Kentucky Baptist Homes for Children. The change occurred around the same time as other Baptist organizations – such as Guidestone Financial Services (formerly the Southern Baptist Annuity Board) and LifeWay Christian Resources (formerly the Baptist Sunday School Board) – were dropping the "Baptist" moniker from their names.

In 2013, Sunrise's then-CEO Bill Smithwick proposed to the board of directors to lift the ban on hiring homosexual employees. Smithwick feared that the prohibition would eventually cost Sunrise its eligibility for state and federal funding, which Smithwick estimated to comprise approximately 85% of its $27 million budget. At the Kentucky Baptist Convention in November 2013, messengers adopted a motion of no confidence in Smithwick; many of the convention's churches withheld financial support while the proposal was being considered, resulting in a $7.5 million shortfall in Sunrise's budget. The board of directors ultimately rejected the proposal, and Smithwick resigned in December 2013 after 16 years as CEO.

Sunrise elected to close its Sunrise Children's Services Youth Support Center in London, Kentucky, on September 26, 2014, after 20 years in operation. The Youth Support Center had been operating at a financial loss; a state grant to Cumberland River Comprehensive Care allowed them to open a competing facility, making it unlikely that the Youth Support Center would be able to achieve financial viability.

"Sunrise Children's Services - Sunrise Found Aaron", a short film produced by Jake Pelfrey of Sunrise Children's Services and Mike Benton of Lexington-based Courage Media, won the "Short Format Program - Informational" award at the 2016 Ohio Valley Emmy Awards. The film chronicled the life of Aaron Green, who was a former foster child placed by Sunrise.

On January 19, 2018, a fire destroyed the activities center on Sunrise's Woodlawn campus in Danville, Kentucky. In September 2018, home improvement retail chain Lowe's announced that it would donate $28,000 in materials and offer the volunteering time of about 50 local store employees to help rebuild the activity center and refurbish other properties on the campus, including the Gibson Cottage, which had remained uninhabited since the 1990s.

In 2018, Clark County resident Judy Huls Singleton agreed to donate her 130-acre (0.53 km^{2}) farm to Sunrise, which planned to open the Solid Rock Children's Ranch on the property.

== Legal issues ==
=== Pedreira case ===
In 1998, Sunrise (then known as Kentucky Baptist Homes for Children) fired Alicia Pedreira after coworkers discovered pictures of Pereira and her lesbian partner on a website for the Kentucky State Fair. A spokeswoman for Sunrise explained that Sunrise "strive[s] to be fair in [its] dealings with all people, including, certainly, [its] employees. At the same time, it is important that [Sunrise] stay[s] true to [its] Christian values. Homosexuality is a lifestyle that would prohibit employment." In response to the firing, five Sunrise employees resigned, and the social work programs from Spalding University and the University of Louisville withdrew their students from working with Sunrise. With the help of the American Civil Liberties Union and Americans United for the Separation of Church and State, Pedreira sued Sunrise and the state of Kentucky, claiming religious discrimination. In 2001, U.S. District Judge Charles Simpson dismissed the case, ruling that "While Baptist Homes seeks to employ only persons who adhere to a behavioral code consistent with its religious mission, the absence of religious requirements leaves their focus on behavior, not religion." Opponents of President George W. Bush's then-recently announced White House Office of Faith-Based and Community Initiatives cited Simpson's decision as an example of potential negative consequences that could result from the government partnering with faith-based organizations.

One aspect of the lawsuit that Judge Charles Simpson allowed to proceed claimed that Sunrise was using taxpayer funds to coerce children in its care into participating in religious practices. In 2015, near the end of his term, Kentucky Governor Steve Beshear reached an agreement with the ACLU and Americans United to settle the case. Under terms of the agreement, the state would "require providers to inform a child and the child's parents of a foster home's religious affiliation, to provide children with opportunities to go to the church of their choice, and to provide non-religious alternatives to religious activities. Providers must also agree not to discriminate against children on the basis of religion, coerce children to engage in religious activity or attempt to convert children to a new religion. Further, when children leave their care, providers must give them an exit survey that asks, among other things, whether the provider tried to convert the child to a new religion." Both the ACLU and Americans United would have gained access to the agency's redacted records to ensure compliance. Sunrise was not party to the settlement and challenged some of its provisions to the Sixth Circuit Court of Appeals—where it won some modifications—and to the Supreme Court of the United States, which twice declined to hear the case. These challenges delayed the agreement becoming effective, and incoming governor Matt Bevin asked the U.S. District Court for the Western District of Kentucky that it be nullified completely. In 2018, Judge Charles Simpson sided with Bevin, saying that the state would have to rewrite its regulations to comply with the agreement, which would have been illegal under state law.

=== Danville ordinance ===
In 2014, the city of Danville, where Sunrise maintains its Woodlawn Campus, passed an ordinance prohibiting discrimination in housing, employment, and public accommodations based on sexual orientation or gender identity. After Sunrise said it would challenge the ordinance in court, the ordinance was amended to exempt "faith-based social services providers". Sunrise stated that if a court challenge was unsuccessful, it would no longer operate in the city.
