= Annie Armstrong =

Lay Southern Baptist denominational leader (1850-1938)

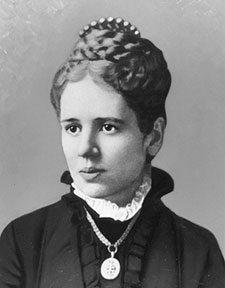
Annie Walker Armstrong, c. 1875

Annie Walker Armstrong (July 11, 1850 – December 20, 1938) was a lay Southern Baptist denominational leader instrumental in the founding of the Woman's Missionary Union.

== Early life ==
Annie Armstrong was born in Baltimore, Maryland to John Dunn Armstrong and his wife Mary Elizabeth (Walker) Armstrong. She had several siblings including a brother named James. She came from a long line of prominent Baptists including her great-great-grandfather Henry Sater who helped establish the first Baptist church in Maryland. At the age of 20, she had a spiritual awakening to Christ and was "born again" under the preaching of Dr. Richard Fuller at Seventh Baptist Church (now Seventh Metro Church). Later, she was among 100 Seventh Baptist Church members who established Eutaw Place Church (now Woodbrook Baptist Church). The church was pastored by Richard Fuller, the third president of the Southern Baptist Convention, who was heavily involved in missionary activities.

She worked with multiple Baltimore missionary organizations ministering to orphans, African Americans, Native Americans, Chinese Americans immigrants, and indigent women and families.

== Woman's Missionary Union ==
In 1888, Armstrong led the creation of the Woman's Missionary Union (WMU), helping draft the constitution and serving as its first correspondent secretary (a position that functioned as executive director).

In her role as the head of the organization, Annie Armstrong facilitated communication between denominational leaders, local congregations and missionaries on the field. She was an extensive letter writer, writing by hand and later by typewriter. In one year alone she wrote 18,000 letters.

During her tenure as head of the WMU, Armstrong refused a salary and traveled extensively at her own expense on behalf of the WMU. Annie was a tireless advocate for missionaries rallying the churches to support mission work through prayer and sacrificial giving. She personally visited missionaries serving throughout the U.S. and carried their stories back to the churches and state conventions through her eyewitness accounts and by circulating their letters. It was due to the efforts of Annie and the women of WMU that the annual Easter mission offering was established in the Southern Baptist Churches in 1895.

=== Controversies and conflicts ===
Annie retired from WMU in 1906. It was through the steely determination of Annie and many other like-minded Southern Baptist women that WMU had been forged against often fierce opposition from the male SBC leadership. The mid to late 1800s were times when public female leadership was virtually unknown. Throughout Annie's career she had successfully gained a growing SBC support due to her Christ-like passion and record for achieving results. Yet, controversy had remained as her leadership, intentions and decisions were at times questioned, misunderstood and publicly aired in various Baptist state newspapers.

In the early 1900s as WMU was continuing to evolve as an organization, there were conflicts over the path forward. To Annie, it seemed her days in leadership were now over precipitating her abrupt decision to step down. She remained very active in her local congregation and in extensive missions work in the city of Baltimore for the remainder of her life.

In 1934, WMU recognized Annie's lifetime of work by naming the annual Easter offering for home missions in her honor. Thus, the Annie Armstrong Easter Offering was born with every dollar going to support missionaries and their work throughout the U.S. and Canada.

== Death and legacy ==
Annie Armstrong died on December 20, 1938, in Baltimore, the year the WMU celebrated its fiftieth anniversary. She was buried in historic Green Mount Cemetery, with her parents and elder siblings. She has been inducted into the Maryland Women's Hall of Fame, and Southern Baptist churches continue to annually collect the Easter Offering for North American Missions in her name.
