= Georgetown College =

Christian college in Georgetown, Kentucky, U.S.

- Motto: Respice Finem (Latin)
- Motto in English: Look to the end (in the sense of "consider the consequences" or "think about the end result")
- Type: Private Christian liberal arts college
- Established: 1829; 197 years ago
- Affiliations: NAIA – Mid-South
- President: Rosemary A. Allen
- Academic staff: 77 full-time and 68 part-time
- Students: 1,565
- Undergraduates: 1,109
- Postgraduates: 456
- Location: Georgetown, Kentucky, U.S. 38.207°N 84.554°W
- Campus: Suburban, 104 acres (42 ha)
- Colors: Black & Orange
- Nickname: Tigers
- Website: georgetowncollege.edu
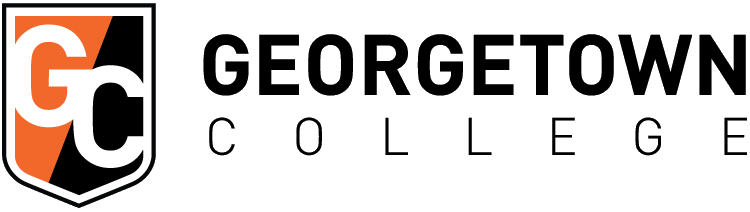

Georgetown College is a private Christian liberal arts college in Georgetown, Kentucky. Chartered in 1829, Georgetown was the first Baptist college west of the Appalachian Mountains.

The college offers over 40 undergraduate degrees and a Master of Arts in education. It offers degrees in areas of visual and performing arts, math and sciences, humanities, language and culture, business, medicine and healthcare, and others.

Georgetown College is associated with five Rhodes Scholars and its alumni have included 38 Fulbright Scholars since 1989.

== History ==
In 1829, the Kentucky General Assembly chartered the Kentucky Baptist Education Society with the purpose of establishing a Baptist college in the state. 24 trustees under the leadership of Silas Noel selected the town of Georgetown as the site for the new school. The first president hired by the college in 1829, William D. Staughton, died before assuming his duties. The second president, Rev. Joel Smith Bacon, stayed two years (1830–1832), fighting court cases to release funding for the college before leaving out of frustration. The third president, Benjamin Farnsworth, endured a power struggle with the Campbellites and resigned in 1837.

In 1838, Rev. Rockwood Giddings became the fourth president of the college. During his short tenure, Giddings began construction on Recitation Hall, the school's first permanent building. Giddings died after a year in office and was replaced by Rev. Howard Malcolm in 1840.

Malcolm oversaw the completion of the construction of the building, now known as Giddings Hall. He also expanded the educational offerings beyond the classics and encouraged the founding of literary societies and the Georgetown Female Academy. He resigned in 1849 when his anti-slavery vote at Kentucky's third constitutional convention resulted in criticism from slavery proponents.

The college experienced steady growth until the Civil War, when a clear divide established between students and faculty. Partisan differences at the start of the war became so hostile, the college was forced to shut down until 1863. By 1867, enrollment had grown to seventy-six students, and, that same year, one of the earliest female seminaries was founded at the college. Basil Manly Jr. was president of Georgetown College from 1871 to 1879.

The college saw steady growth for the next century but experienced a major boom following World War II and the GI Bill.

The college is associated with five Rhodes Scholars and, since 1989, its alumni have included 38 Fulbright Scholars. The college also has an honors program and a partnership with Regent's Park College, Oxford.

As the student population grew in the late 20th century, the administration sought ways to diversify the campus and protect academic freedom. In 2005, Georgetown College and the Kentucky Baptist Convention reached an agreement on a separation plan, due to the college's desire to elect non-Baptist members to the board of trustees. In 2013, the Kentucky Baptist Convention officially ended its partnership with the college.

In 2014, the college earned the highest rating for protecting free speech on campus.

== Academics ==
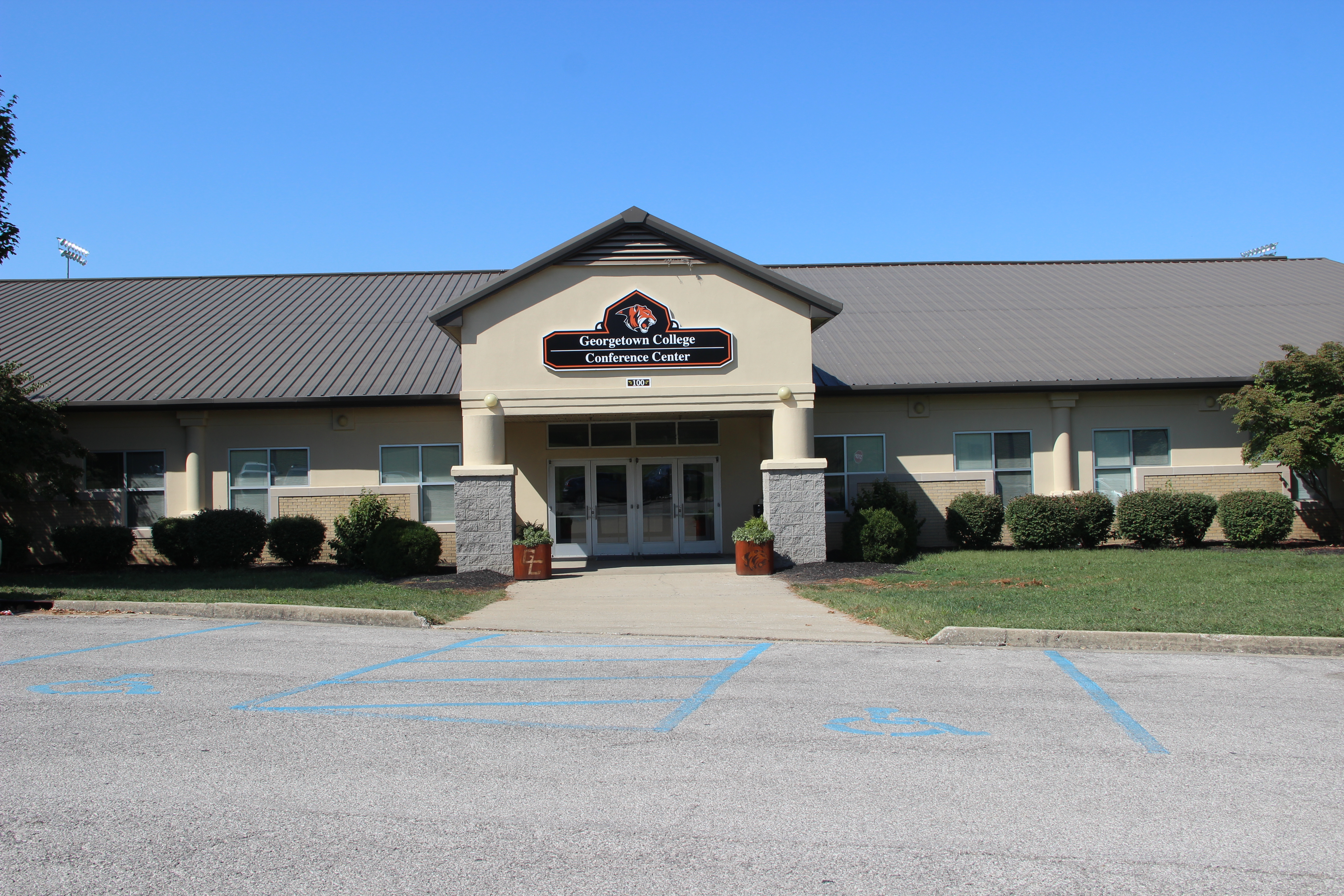
Conference Center

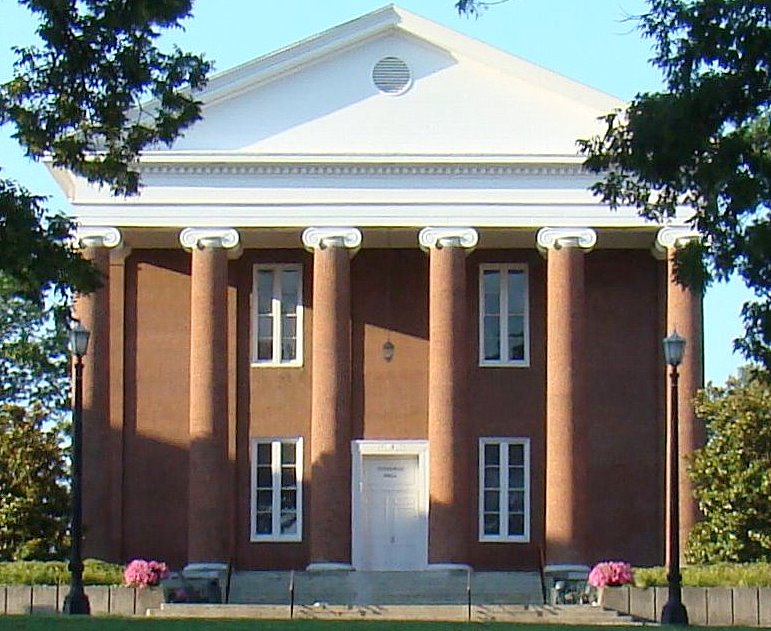
Giddings Hall

Georgetown College offers Bachelor of Arts degrees, Bachelor of Science degrees, and several dual-program degrees in 38 undergraduate majors. The college also offers a Master of Arts degree in education.

The college has a 14:1 student to faculty ratio and most classes have 17 or fewer students.

Georgetown College is accredited by the Southern Association of Colleges and Schools Commission on Colleges to award baccalaureate and master's degrees.

=== Admissions ===
In 2023, the college accepted 71.7% of applicants, with those admitted having an average 3.57 GPA and an average of 1121 SAT score or an average 21 ACT score. High school GPA is considered important by the college and, of students responding, 86% found that the admissions process made them feel the school cared about them and 86% found that the admissions process evaluated them not just as a set of numbers.

=== Rankings ===
Georgetown College was ranked #156-201 in National Liberal Arts Colleges in the U.S. News & World Report's 2022-23 Best Colleges ranking.

== Student organizations ==
Georgetown College has 46 student clubs and organizations. The college offers a chapel and several Christian and other religious groups for students.

=== Student life ===
Georgetown College has four national fraternities and five national sororities on campus.

Government-minded students can join the College Democrats, College Republicans, United Nations Georgetown, and the Student Government Association.

Recreation and activity oriented groups include the Georgetown Activities Council, intramurals, Georgetown College Equestrian Team, Georgetown College Film Club, Outdoor High Adventure Club, Social Plug, and the Georgetown College Disc Golf Club.

Activist groups include the Georgetown Sustainability Initiative, Campus Spectrum, Habitat for Humanity, Student Abolitionist Movement, and the American Red Cross Club.

Students interested in the arts can participate in the Dance Marathon, George-Tones, Gospel Choir, Lyric Theatre Society, Maskrafters/Alpha Psi Omega, MTNA piano club, Praise Dance Ministry, and the Step Team.

Religious organizations include Common Ground and Campus Outreach.

Academic groups include Alpha Lambda Delta, American Chemical Society Club, Biology Club, Brokmeyer Society (philosophy), Delta Omicron, Georgetown College Athletic Training Students, Kentucky Education Association, Math/Physics/Computer Science Club, Nat'l Association for Music Education, Psi Chi/Psi Alpha Omega, Sigma Tau Delta (English honorary, Eta Alpha chapter, est. 1925), Sociology Club, Student Women and Gender Society, Students of National Association for Teachers of Singing, and the Academic Team.

Other student organizations include Ambassadors of Diversity, Pre-Health Association, SHAC, SHMAC, Tiger Squad, Commuter Club, and the Real Food Coalition.

=== Maskrafters ===
The Georgetown College Maskrafter theater group is the oldest collegiate theater company in Kentucky and offers traditional theater, an emphasis on creating original work, and new initiatives in digital motion picture art. As of 2007, the Maskrafters had produced a feature-length movie entitled Surviving Guthrie, and had put on the musical She Loves Me. Recent plays include Proof, The Fantasticks, Grease, and Shakespeare's The Tempest. The Maskrafters are primarily students at Georgetown, and are guided by staff.

=== Media ===
A student-run newspaper, called The Georgetonian, publishes multiple issues per semester. A student-run radio station, WRVG, is housed on campus in the Cralle Student Center.

=== Traditions ===
Songfest is an evening of skits written by, starring, and produced by Greek and independent groups on campus. Skits are centered on the Homecoming theme, and also incorporate singing, dancing, and acting. Groups engage in competitions to win awards.

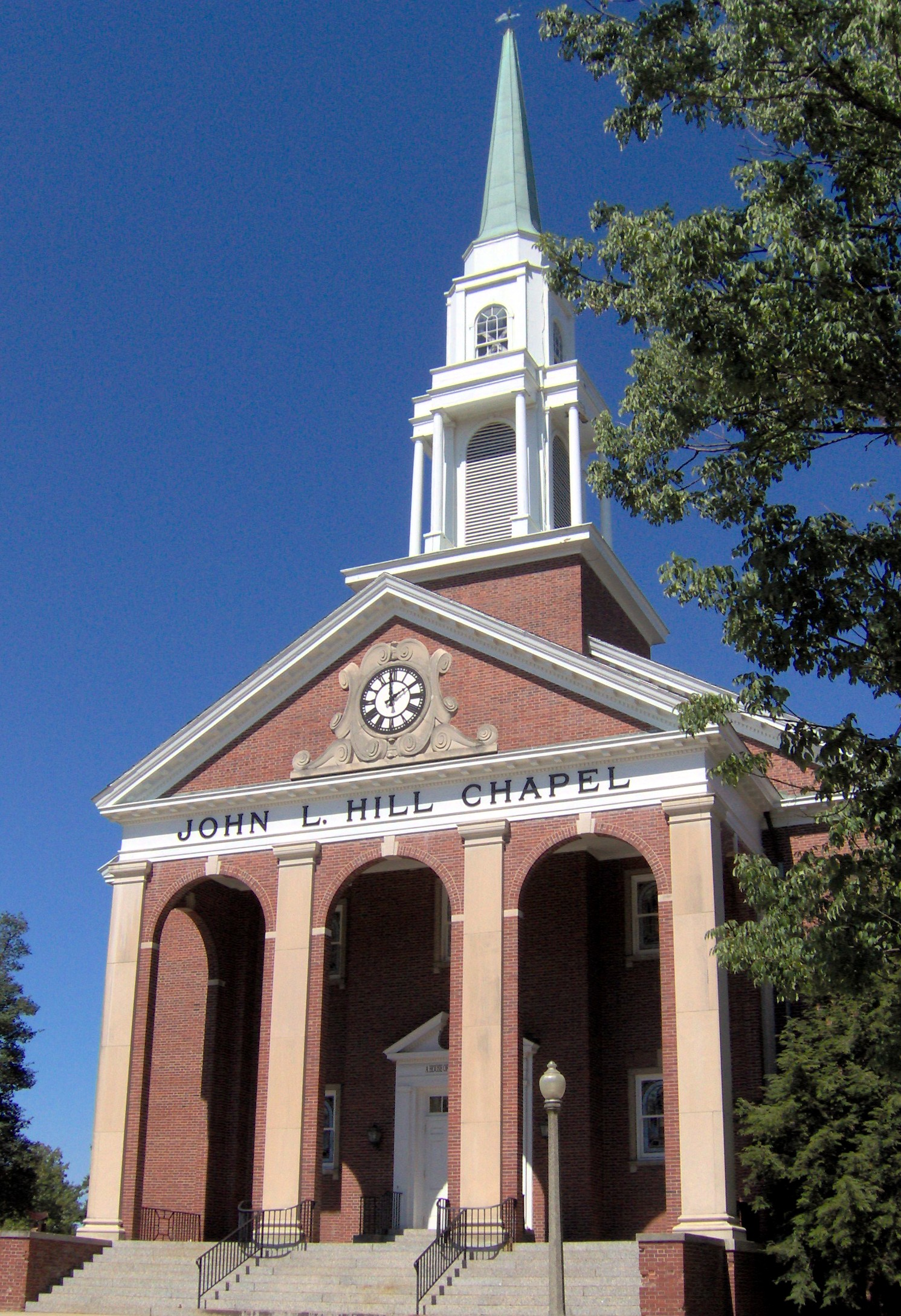
John L. Hill Chapel

Chapel Day and Men's Bid Day takes place each fall. Chapel Day is a sorority event letting the active members know which pledges have accepted their bid to join the sorority. The pledges dress in their new sorority's colors and run through the doors of the chapel into the waiting arms of their sisters. The fraternities' version of Chapel Day occurs the following week. Referred to as Men's Bid Day, it operates in a similar fashion. Even independent students, faculty, staff, family, and sometimes pets brave the cold to enjoy the excitement of this special campus tradition.

Homecoming is an annual tradition, highlighted by Songfest and a football game. Every year, alumni head back to Georgetown's campus. On Saturday morning they have brunch, listen to live music, and visit with fellow alumni, professors and current students. A Homecoming King and Queen, elected by the student body, are crowned during halftime of the football game.

Belle of the Blue is Georgetown's small-scale version of Miss America. It is an annual scholarship pageant that any freshman through junior woman can participate in. Each residence hall, including the male dormitories, nominates a woman to compete as their representative in the February event. On pageant night, the women are judged based on scholarship, interview, talent, poise and appearance. A "Miss Congeniality" title is awarded, as well as an overall scholarship to Georgetown College.

Midnight Brunch – The Caf, each semester, selects one night during finals week to open at midnight. Students listen to music that blares and games are played, and the professors serve students platefuls of comfort food to help fuel their late-night study sessions.

Grubfest happens each September. Students join the annual battle to see which team can complete the most challenges. In a matter of hours, the Quad, a lush, green open area for socializing and studying, is turned into a slimy, muddy arena covered with food products. At the end of Grubfest, the two dirtiest and most creative participants are crowned king and queen of the year's festivities.

Opening Convocation is held in the chapel in the early fall and is a campus-wide assembly intended to create a sense of academic community and common purpose as the academic year begins.

Hanging of the Green is held each December, and students, faculty, and staff gather together in the chapel on the first Monday night of the month for a worship service including an advent wreath lit by faculty and staff, an upperclassman offering the service's message, and a Christmas tree trimmed on stage with ornaments representing various organizations on campus. At the end, the attendees sing "Silent Night".

Commencement, or the graduation ceremony, takes place every May on Giddings Lawn. Seniors troop through the doors of Giddings Hall and fan out onto the front lawn, where commencement proceeds.

== Athletics ==
The Georgetown athletic teams are called the Tigers. The university is a member of the National Association of Intercollegiate Athletics (NAIA), primarily competing in the Mid-South Conference (MSC) since the 1995–96 academic year. The Tigers previously competed in the Kentucky Intercollegiate Athletic Conference (KIAC; now currently known as the River States Conference (RSC) since the 2016–17 school year) from 1916–17 to 1994–95.

Georgetown competes in 22 intercollegiate varsity sports: Men's sports include baseball, basketball, cross country, football, golf, soccer, tennis, track & field (indoor and outdoor) and volleyball; while women's sports include basketball, cross country, golf, lacrosse, soccer, softball, tennis, track & field (indoor and outdoor) and volleyball; and co-ed sports include archery and cheerleading. Former sports included women's acrobatics & tumbling. Club sports include bass fishing and dance.

=== Attempt to move to NCAA Division II ===
On April 28, 2012, the college officially announced that after a year-long study, it had decided to transfer its athletics program to NCAA Division II. It was presumed they would join the newly formed Great Midwest Athletic Conference (G-MAC). However, on July 24, 2012, the college announced that its application to join the NCAA was denied. The membership committee had notified them on July 12 that "it felt that Georgetown College was not ready to enter the process at this time." As of 2021, Georgetown hasn't yet re-applied to transition into NCAA Division II.

=== Accomplishments ===
- 3 NAIA football national championships (1991, 2000, and 2001)
- 3 NAIA men's basketball national championships (1998, 2013, 2019)
- 1 NAIA men's volleyball national championship (2024)

== Notable alumni ==
- Robert S. James, Baptist pastor and father to outlaws Jesse James and Frank James
- Ben M. Bogard, clergyman, founder of the American Baptist Association, based primarily in Little Rock, Arkansas
- LaVerne Butler, Southern Baptist pastor and former president of Mid-Continent University in Mayfield, Kentucky
- Woo Chia-wei, the founding president of Hong Kong University of Science and Technology
- Blanton Collier, National Football League head coach of the Cleveland Browns, 1963–1970
- Thomas E. Corts, president at Wingate University and at Samford University
- Billy Ray Cyrus, country music singer
- Kenny Davis, three-time NAIA All-American; captain of the 1972 US Olympic basketball team
- Susan Johns, former member of the Kentucky Senate and the Kentucky House of Representatives
- Buell Kazee, musician and Baptist minister
- Harry Lancaster, college basketball and baseball coach at Kentucky
- Bruce McNorton, professional football player
- John Gordon Mein, United States Ambassador to Guatemala
- Joe Dan Osceola, Chief and Ambassador of the Seminole Indian tribe of Florida
- Mike Polly, football player and Division 1 football coach
- Scott Pruitt, Administrator of the Environmental Protection Agency and former Attorney General of Oklahoma
- Will Rabatin, football player
- Arthur Yager, Governor of Puerto Rico
- Donald W. Zacharias, sixth president of Western Kentucky University and 15th president of Mississippi State University
