= Anne Marie Miller =

American public speaker and author

- Born: February 19, 1980 (age 46)
- Occupations: Author, public speaker
- Writing career
- Period: 2005–2019
- Genre: Spirituality
- Subject: Psychology
- Website: www.annemariemiller.com

Anne Marie Miller is an American nurse, public speaker and author who writes on topics such as faith, sexuality, and psychology. Miller works as a hospice nurse and case manager. Miller and her daughter live in Fort Worth, Texas.

== Sexual abuse advocacy and criminal case ==
In 1996, Miller was sexually assaulted by Southern Baptist seminary student Mark Aderholt at Southwestern Baptist Theological Seminary at the age of 16, though she did not recognize or report the abuse until in her twenties. In an interview with PBS Newshour Miller stated she saw the abuse as "sin" and felt she needed to "protect this man of God" (Aderholt) who was abusing her.

On July 2, 2018, Aderholt was arrested and charged with three felonies including sexual assault of a minor under 17 in Tarrant County, Texas. On December 19, 2018, Aderholt was indicted on three counts of indecency with a minor under 17 by contact and sexual assault of a youth under 17. Miller's public report was key in the Southern Baptist Convention and International Mission Board investigating and updating of their policies on sexual abuse and misconduct. The IMB originally covered up the abuse by not reporting it to the authorities in 2007, when they determined Aderholt "more likely than not" abused Miller and that he was "not truthful" with the IMB, Miller, or to his family. Aderholt resigned from the IMB with no consequence and was allowed to pastor in large churches until he became an executive with the South Carolina Baptist Convention which oversees 2000 churches. Aderholt volunteered with children during this time.

The Tarrant County's District Attorney was preparing for trial when a plea deal was proposed by the defense at the final docket before the motion to set a trial date was established. After extensive consideration, the District Attorney's office, with Miller's input, agreed to allow the deal proposed by the defense. Aderholt pleaded guilty to a fifth and lesser charge of Assault Causing Bodily Injury on July 2, 2019. He faced maximum sentencing, though, after 24 months of successful deferred adjudication, his record will be expunged. He was sentenced to 30 days in jail, a $4000 fine, and 2 years probation with a no-contact order protecting Miller and her daughter. Miller has since communicated that she regrets her decision to accept the deal and would have preferred to go to trial. Miller states, "While I think we all can agree that Mr. Aderholt is not facing the criminal penalty he should be, the DA’s office asked for my input and wishes during plea negotiations. This included taking into consideration the emotionally charged prospect of a jury trial, facing a relentless and brutal cross-examination by his defense attorney and the impact of a trial on my family."

According to the Fort Worth Star Telegram, who originally broke the story of Miller's abuse and cover-up by the Southern Baptist Convention, Samantha Jordan, the communications officer in the Office of Tarrant County Criminal District confirmed that Miller read a "passionate" victim impact statement to Aderholt at his sentencing and what Miller wanted was to "hear him say that he was guilty." The article also reported that "Miller also told Aderholt that she had forgiven him and was moving forward with her life. Other than pleading guilty in the hearing, Aderholt made no other statements. He was very flushed but he didn't show any emotion at any time," Jordan said.

Anne Marie Miller was named one of the 10 women who are changing the Southern Baptist response to abuse by Christianity Today.

== Charitable involvement ==
In February 2008, Miller traveled to Uganda with Compassion International. She has since traveled to India, the Dominican Republic, Moldova, Russia Zambia, South Africa, Swaziland, the Philippines and Haiti as well as many disenfranchised communities in the United States for journalist ventures regarding poverty and relief work. She was a cyclist on the 2010 Cross Country Cycling Ride:Well Tour in effort to raise funds and awareness for Nashville-based Blood Water Mission, a water and AIDS intervention non-profit. Miller presently volunteers with the organization "Supporters of Survivors" which helps family members and friends support sexual abuse survivors and is a member of her hospital's unit based committee for patient quality improvement.

== Published works ==
- Mad Church Disease – Overcoming the Burnout Epidemic, 2009 (Harper/Zondervan)
- What Matters Now, with Seth Godin, 2009
- Permission to Speak Freely: Essays and Art on Fear, Confession and Grace, 2010 (Nelson/W)
- Mad Church Disease – Overcoming the Burnout Epidemic, Fifth Anniversary Edition (Self-Published), 2014
- Beating Burnout: A 30 Day Guide to Hope and Health, 2014 (Self-Published)
- Lean on Me: Finding Intentional, Vulnerable and Consistent Community, 2014 (Nelson/W)
- Surviving Christmas: Advent Devotions for the Hard and Holy Holidays (Self-Published), 2015
- 5 Things Every Parent Needs to Know About Their Kids and Sex, 2016 (Baker Academic)
- Healing Together: A Guide To Supporting Sexual Abuse Survivors, 2019 (HarperCollins/Z)
