= First Baptist Church (Woodstock, Georgia) =

- First Baptist Church Woodstock
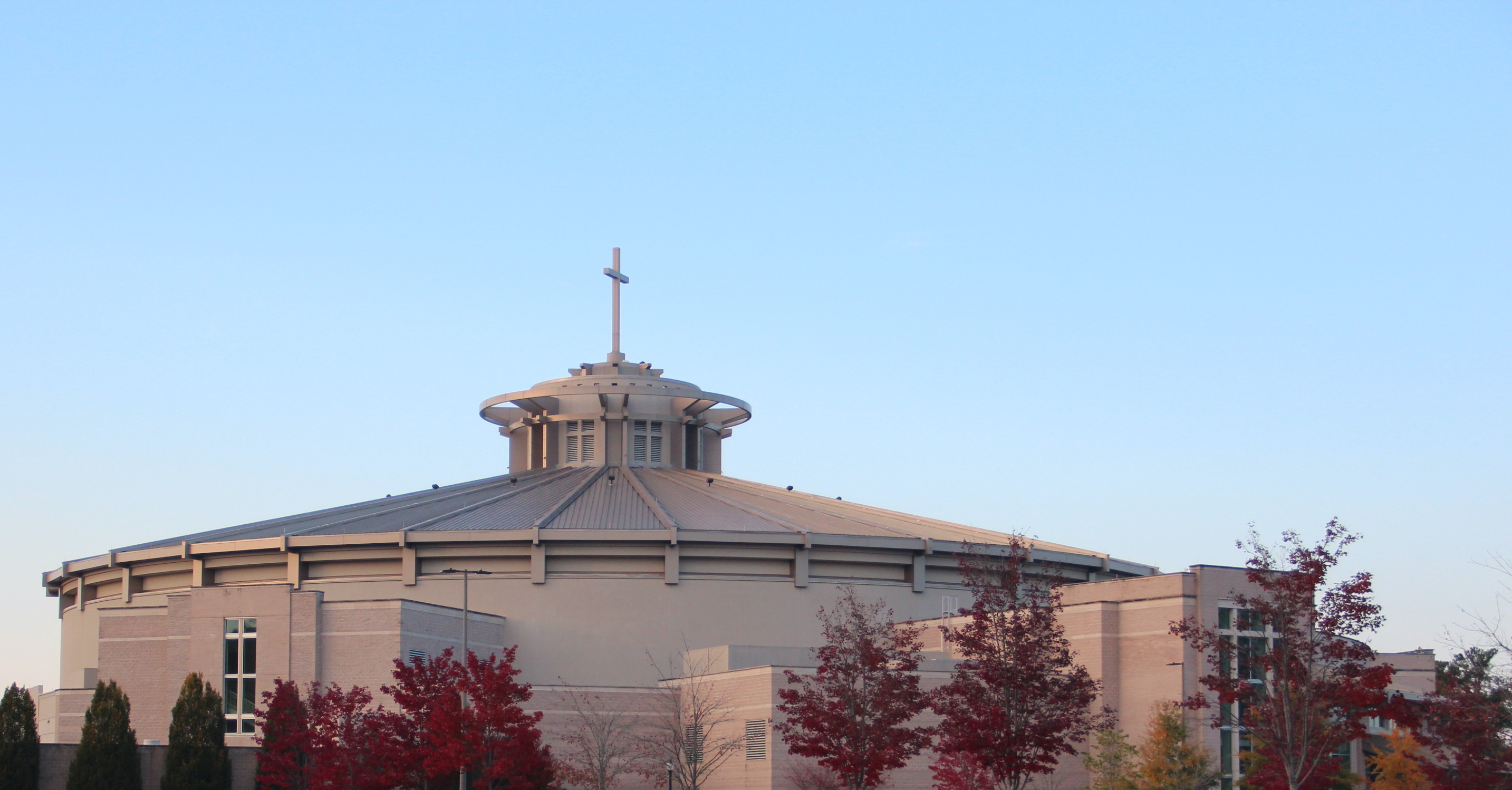
- First Baptist Church
- Location: Woodstock, Georgia
- Country: United States
- Denomination: Baptist
- Website: fbcw.org

History
- Founded: 1837

First Baptist Church Woodstock is a Baptist megachurch in the northwestern Atlanta suburb of Woodstock, Georgia. It is affiliated with the Southern Baptist Convention. The lead pastor is Jeremy Morton.

== History ==
It was founded in 1837 as the Enon Church.

In 1879, Enon Baptist Church moved to Downtown Woodstock.

In 1884, the name was changed to Woodstock Baptist Church.

In 1913, the sanctuary burned and replaced with the building that currently stands in Downtown Woodstock.

In 1986, Johnny M. Hunt, former Southern Baptist Convention President, became senior pastor. The attendance was 1,027 members.

In 1991, First Baptist Woodstock moved to a new 2,400 seat sanctuary on Neese Road.

In 2005, First Baptist Woodstock's new 7,000 seat Worship Center opened.

In 2019, Pastor Hunt announced a transition where he would step down from his role at FBCW, and Jeremy Morton would assume the Senior Pastor position. Both Johnny Hunt and Jeremy Morton lead as co-pastors during the majority of 2019. The transition was completed in December 2019.

== Ministries ==
Clothes closet and food pantry.

== See also ==
- List of the largest churches in the USA
