= International Mission Board =

International Baptist missionary society

- Abbreviation: IMB
- Founded: May 10, 1845; 181 years ago
- Type: Non-profit, Christian
- Headquarters: Richmond, Virginia, U.S.
- Location: Global
- Fields: Christian Missionary Outreach
- Affiliations: Southern Baptist Convention
- Website: www.imb.org
- Formerly called: Foreign Mission Board

The International Mission Board (IMB), formerly the Foreign Mission Board, is an international Baptist Christian missionary society affiliated with the Southern Baptist Convention (SBC). The headquarters is in Richmond, Virginia.

== History ==
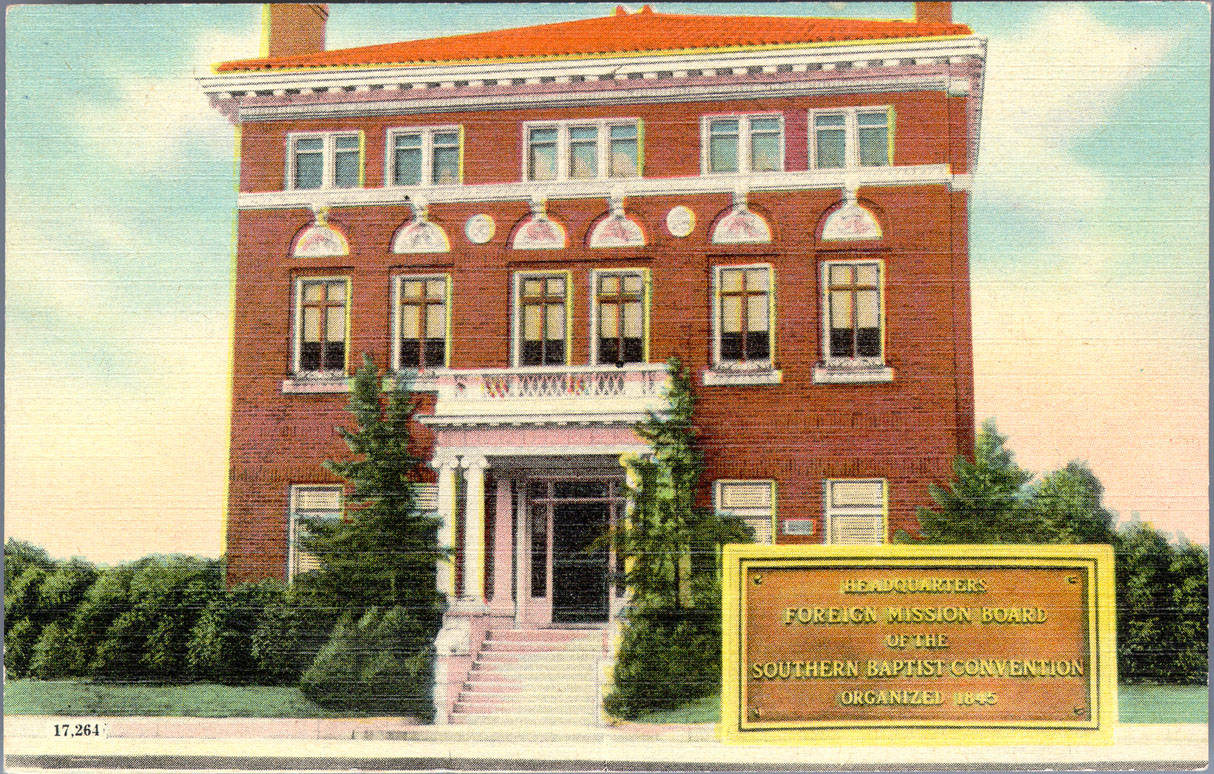
Postcard of the Foreign Mission Board building in Richmond, Virginia. Photo courtesy of the Virginia Commonwealth University Libraries

In 1843, abolitionist Baptist pastors of Massachusetts met at Boston Tremont Temple and founded the American and Foreign Mission Society in opposition to slavery in the South. In 1844, the Baptist Board for Foreign Missions refused to approve a slaveowner proposed by the Georgia State Convention, Elder James E. Reeve as a missionary, recognizing the case as a challenge and not wanting to overturn their policy of neutrality in the slavery issue. They stated that slavery should not be introduced as a factor into deliberations about missionary appointments. This decision prompted the Alabama Baptist State Convention to challenge the Home Mission Board with what were called the "Alabama Resolutions", drafted by Rev. Basil Manly, Sr. They threatened to withdraw financial support from the national organization if their candidates were not considered for positions as missionaries, regardless of whether they were slaveholders. In its response, the Board noted that they needed to maintain independence in their approval of missionary appointments. They further stated that in 30 years, no slaveholder had applied to be a missionary. They said missionaries traveled without servants, so no slaveholder could take slaves with him. Lastly, they said that they would "never be a party to any arrangement which would imply approbation of slavery." Dissatisfied with the decision, added to other sectional tensions, Baptists of nine Southern states split from the Triennial Convention and in 1845 formed the Southern Baptist Convention.

Thousands of small Southern Baptist churches dotted the landscape throughout the United States in the mid-19th century. Recognizing that many churches working together in missions could accomplish more than any one, the Board of Foreign Missions was established on May 10, 1845 (the same date the Southern Baptist Convention was formed) and headquartered in Richmond, Virginia. Created as a missionary sending organization funded through the cooperative efforts of SBC churches, they chose China as their first mission field, and on September 1, 1845, the board appointed their first missionaries, Samuel C. Clopton and George Pearcy.

In January 1849 the board began The Commission magazine to keep constituents informed of the mission work being carried out. Monthly circulation of the periodical reached 7,000 by April 1850. It eventually became an online magazine with an occasional print issue. Their first publication, Southern Baptist Missionary Journal, is defunct.

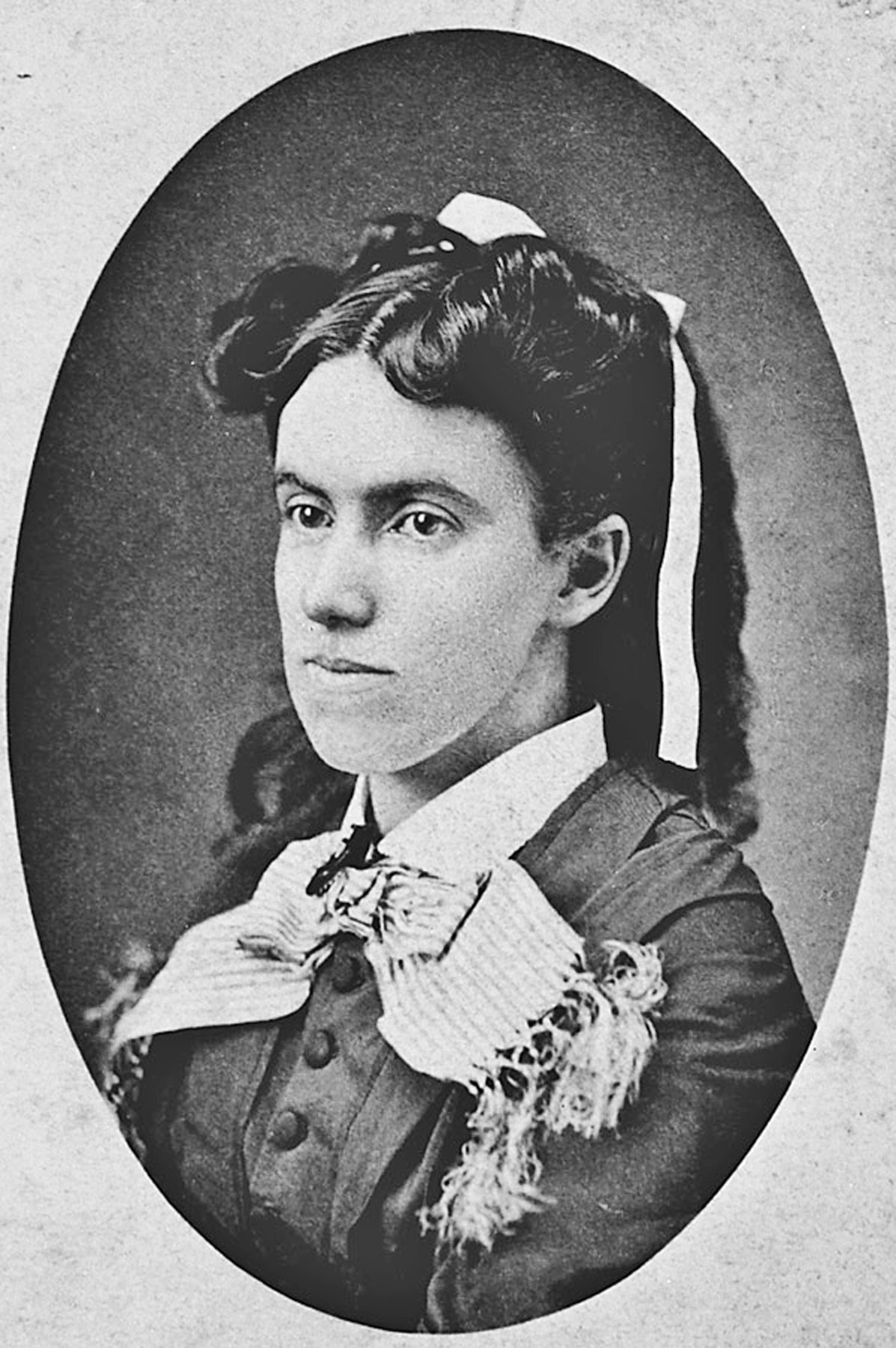
Lottie Moon

In 1872, the American and Foreign Mission Society merged with the American Baptist Missionary Union of the American Baptist Churches USA.

On July 7, 1873, the board appointed its most famous missionary, Charlotte D. "Lottie" Moon, to China. Moon served many years among the Chinese and after giving her life to foreign missions. In 1888 an annual fund-raising effort, The Lottie Moon Christmas Offering, was sponsored by the Woman's Missionary Union. By December 1950 the Board had appointed a record-breaking 111 missionaries in that year alone.

In July 1964 the Board began an effort to send single missionaries called the Journeyman Program. Today the Journeyman Program sends out hundreds of singles and married couples under 30 years of age each year for a two-year term throughout the world. In February 1989 the International Service Corps program was introduced to facilitate short-term missions for projects lasting from 4 to 24 months with a possible 12-month extension.

In 1997 the Foreign Mission Board voted to change its name to the International Mission Board. The International Mission Board celebrated its 175th anniversary in 2020, and in 2022 it had 3,552 missionaries.

In 2005, the International Mission Board won a judgement against Benton Gray Harvey for $359,499.62 for embezzlement while he was an accountant for the IMB in Istanbul, Turkey. The incident was investigated by a trustee after a whistleblower on the "Turkey Team" notified staff at a SBC seminary about the situation. In 2005 Tony Cupit of the Baptist World Alliance accused IMB of conveying “a very false picture” by manipulating baptism statistics, such as by claiming all as the work of their missionaries without acknowledging local preachers and non-visited churches as adding to the total number.

In June 2006 Enid, Oklahoma, pastor and IMB trustee Wade Burleson voiced concerns about IMB, including: "The suppression of dissent by trustees in the minority through various means by those in the majority.” He voiced his concerns after the board recommended he be removed after posting criticism on his blog about the board's new policies on baptism and speaking in tongues. The decision was later rescinded internally after Burleson agreed to a new set of guidelines stating trustees may only speak in "positive and supportive terms."

In 2018, author Anne Marie Miller publicly disclosed in a report by the Fort Worth Star-Telegram how the IMB covered up abuse by one of their missionaries, Mark Edwin Aderholt. Miller disclosed the abuse to the IMB in 2007 and they determined it was "more likely than not" that Aderholt sexually abused Miller when she was a minor. They allowed Aderholt to resign and did not inform future employers of this accusation. Miller reported the abuse to authorities in early 2018 and Aderholt was arrested in July 2018 and indicted on four felony sex crimes in December 2018. Shortly after his arrest, the IMB apologized and initiated an external examination of Miller's case and all other sexual abuse cases. On June 2, 2019, the Houston Chronicle uncovered a pattern of abuse covered up by the IMB. The third party examination by Minnesota firm Gray Plant Mooty revealed serious faults with IMB's "zero tolerance" sexual abuse policy. Gray Plant Mooty "identified a number of significant concerns with IMB’s handling of past cases" and that the "IMB’s current policies and procedures fall short of contemporary best practice standards." The IMB issued a statement saying they are implementing the recommendations of Gray Plant Mooty, though at the 2019 Southern Baptist Church Annual Convention, new president Paul Chitwood did not mention the report or findings, and a motion made by former IMB trustee Wade Burleson to make the report public was denied by legal counsel saying it was "out of order."

== See also ==
- List of American Southern Baptist missionaries in China
- North American Mission Board
