= Woman's Missionary Union =

Protestant mission organization for women

Woman's Missionary Union (WMU) is an auxiliary of the Southern Baptist Convention that was founded in 1888. It is the largest Protestant missions organization for women in the world.

The WMU sees its work as ‘’making disciples of Jesus who live in mission’’; this is done by providing resources, engaging with ministries and offering leadership development.

== History ==
=== Origins ===
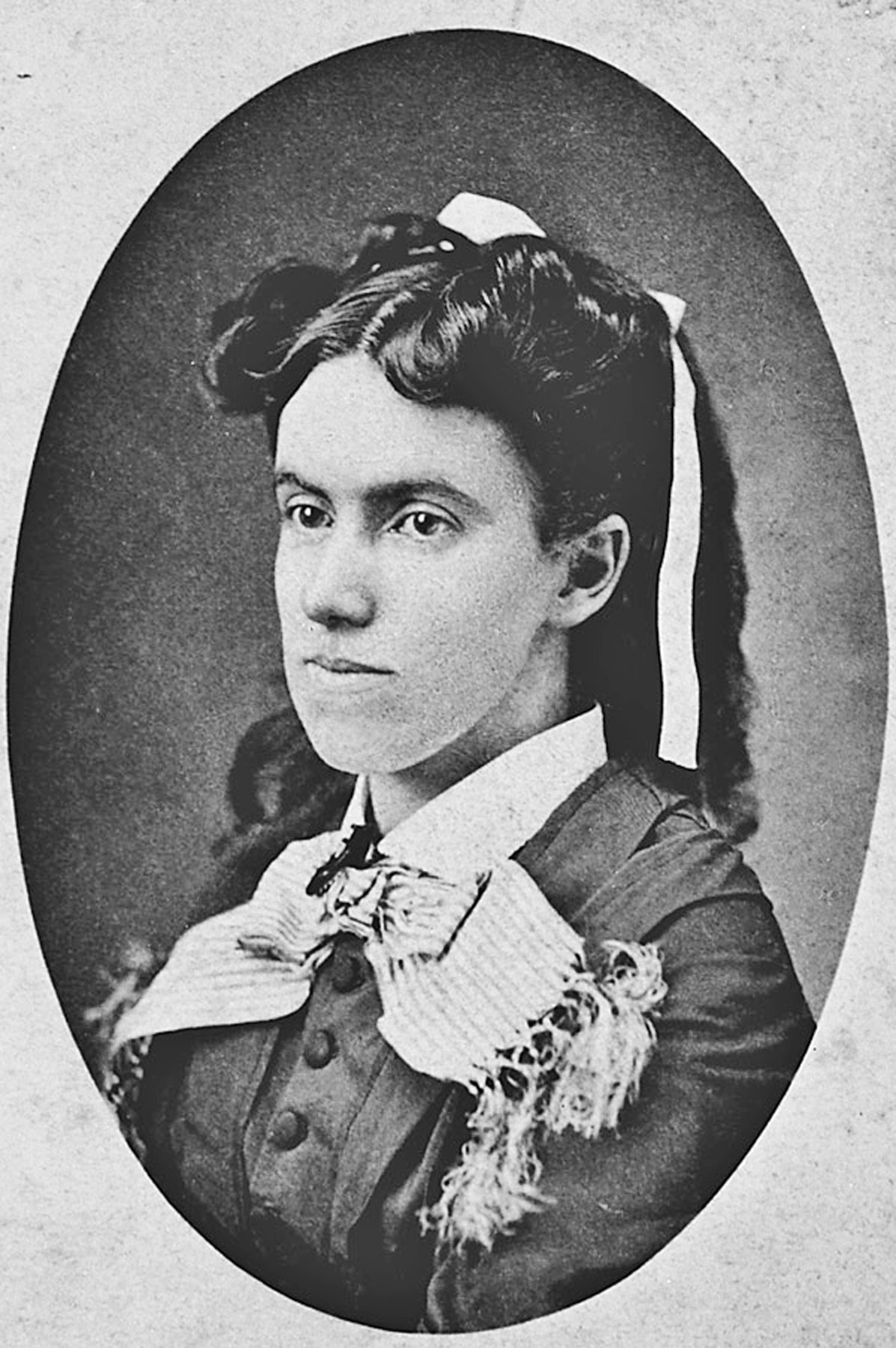
Lottie Moon

During the meeting of the Southern Baptist Convention in Richmond, Virginia, in May 1888, a group of women delegates from 12 states gathered at the Broad Street United Methodist Church and organized the Executive Committee of the Woman's Mission Societies, Auxiliary to Southern Baptist Convention.

In previous years, women had been meeting during the convention to discuss the possibilities of creating a missions organization. During the 1888 meeting, a constitution was adopted and the first officers were elected. Baltimore, Maryland, was chosen as headquarters.

Fannie E.S. Heck led the Woman's Missionary Union after 1892 for about 15 years.

The dominant personality was Lottie Moon (1840–1912) who spent nearly 40 years (1873–1912) living and working in China. She was an early feminist pioneer for women's equality, but her reputation in Baptist memory is one of a Southern belle who followed traditional gender roles. Her memory is used in the Union's main annual fundraising drive, the Lottie Moon Christmas Offering which was set up in 1918. By 2023, the fund had raised over $5 billion.

=== Baltimore years ===
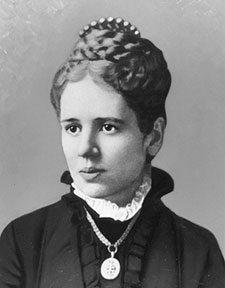
Annie Armstrong

Annie Armstrong, elected as the first corresponding secretary during the organizational meeting, lived in Baltimore. WMU was originally established and remains an auxiliary to the Southern Baptist Convention, which means that it acts as a "helper" to the SBC. The auxiliary status also means that WMU is self-governing and self-supporting.

Prior to this meeting, women had been gathering to pray for missions under the leadership of women such as Ann Baker Graves. In 1871, Baptist women in Baltimore founded Woman's Mission to Woman for the purpose of prayer and dissemination of information about missionaries. Maryland Baptist women began publishing and distributing missions literature in 1887. Although many southern states had a missions organization for women, there was no central body to provide unity or coordinate efforts. The time had come for the women to organize and the founding mothers of WMU established an organization that has been supporting Baptist missions for over a century. WMU has had the leadership of seven corresponding secretaries/executive directors (Sandy Wisdom Martin serves currently) and seventeen presidents (Connie Dixon serves currently).

In 1934, the Annie Armstrong Easter Offering was set up in her memory. By 2023, the fund had raised over $2 billion for work in the USA.

=== Name change ===
In 1890 the women adopted the name Woman's Missionary Union, Auxiliary to Southern Baptist Convention. The headquarters of WMU was originally stationed in the Maryland Baptist Missions Reading Room where Annie Armstrong had an already established office.

== Training school ==
In 1907, the WMU Training School was established in Louisville, KY; the school was renamed as the Carver School of Missions and Social Work in 1953. The Carver School closed in 1997.

=== Move to Birmingham ===
In 1921, the national headquarters was moved to Birmingham, Alabama under the guidance of Kathleen Moore Mallory to 1111 Comer Building. As WMU grew into its own, space began to be a problem at the national headquarters. In 1951, WMU purchased property at 600 20th Street North in downtown Birmingham. It was during these years that WMU membership reached an all-time high of 1.5 million women under the dynamic leadership of Alma Hunt, who served as executive secretary from 1948 to 1974.

=== Reorganization ===
The 1970s brought changes to the organizations of WMU. In October of that year, WMS, YWA, Girls' Auxiliary, and Sunbeams were changed to Baptist Women (BW), Baptist Young Women (BYW), Acteens, Girls in Action (GA), and Mission Friends.

Change in publications followed as Contempo, Accent, Discovery, Aware, and Dimension were introduced into the WMU publications family.

=== New headquarters ===
In 1984, the national headquarters moved once again to New Hope Mountain on U.S. Highway 280, just outside the Birmingham city limits.

In 1985, New Hope was created for the publication of products designed to reach a wider audience. In 1995, more changes were made to the WMU organizations and magazine publications. Baptist Women and Baptist Young Women were included in a new organization called Women on Mission.

At this time, Royal Service magazine was replaced by Missions Mosaic. Three new mission organizations were introduced in 1995 as well: Adults on Mission, Youth on Mission, and Children in Action.

=== WMU today ===
Since its beginning in 1888, WMU has become the largest Protestant missions organization for women in the world, with a membership of approximately 1 million. WMU's main purpose is to educate and involve adults, youth, children, and preschoolers in the cause of Christian missions. Although originally geared towards women, girls, and preschoolers, both genders are active participants in WMU organizations and ministries today. These ministries are: Baptist Nursing Fellowship^{SM}, Christian Women's Job Corps, International Initiatives^{SM}, Missionary Housing, Project HELP^{SM}, Pure Water, Pure Love^{SM}, Volunteer Connection^{SM}, and WorldCrafts^{SM}.

By 2018, WMU supported over 7,000 missionaries in 109 countries.

In 2023, the WMU was based in Birmingham, Alabama and had a membership of almost 1 million people; as an auxiliary group, it is independent of SBC governance.

== Purpose ==
WMU "seeks to equip adults, youth, children and preschoolers with missions education to become radically involved in the mission of God. Headquartered in Birmingham, Ala., WMU is a nonprofit organization that offers an array of missions resources including conferences, ministry ideas and models, volunteer opportunities, curriculum for age-level organizations, leadership training, books and more."

== Organizations, opportunities, and resources ==
WMU provides missions education organizations for all ages:

- Women on Mission, for women 18 and up
- Adults on Mission, for men and women 18 and up
- Acteens, for girls grades 7-12
- Youth on Mission, for boys and girls grades 7-12
- Girls in Action (GA), for girls grades 1-6
- Royal Ambassadors, for boys grades 1-6
- Children in Action, for boys and girls grades 1-6
- Mission Friends, for preschool girls and boys birth through kindergarten

WMU also provides a variety of missions opportunities and resources:

- Baptist Nursing Fellowship, an organization which encourages health-care service stemming from a personal commitment to Jesus Christ
- Christian Women's Job Corps and Christian Men's Job Corps, ministries that help equip women and men in need for life and employment
- International Initiatives, which addresses issues facing women and children through international partnerships
- Missionary housing, providing short-term housing for international missionaries
- Missions Interchange, a missions website for collegiate women
- myMISSIONfulfilled, a missions website for young adult women
- New Hope Publishers, a Christian publisher that challenges Christian believers to understand and be radically involved in the mission of God
- Project HELP, a two-year emphasis which addresses a selected social issue
- Pure Water, Pure Love, which provides clean drinking water for missionaries and the people they serve
- Volunteer Connection, a network that matches volunteers with missions needs, and includes MissionsFEST and FamilyFEST mission trips
- WMU Store, a wealth of Christian missions resources, including missions idea books for any church
- WorldCrafts, a ministry that supports artisans around the world through selling fairly traded, handmade items

== See also ==
- Women's missionary societies
