= Kentucky Baptist Convention =

US Christian religious convention

The Kentucky Baptist Convention (KBC) is a state Baptist convention affiliated with the Southern Baptist Convention. Headquartered in Louisville, it is made up of nearly 2,400 churches and 71 local associations. Membership in its churches totals more than 780,000 people.

In 2025, the director is Todd Gray.

== History ==
The history of Baptists in Kentucky predates the KBC, which was founded in 1837. In 1769, Squire Boone II became the first pastor to arrive west of the Allegheny Mountains. In April 1776, three months before the United States declared its independence from Great Britain, Thomas Tinsley and William Hickman conducted what is considered to be the first evangelical service west of the Alleghenies in Harrodsburg.

== Affiliated universities and colleges ==
- Clear Creek Baptist Bible College

== Affiliated organizations ==
- Kentucky Baptist Assemblies, Inc.
- Kentucky Baptist Foundation
- Sunrise Children's Services, formerly known as Kentucky Baptist Homes for Children
- Oneida Baptist Institute
- Western Recorder
- Kentucky Today
