= North American Mission Board =

Domestic missions agency

The North American Mission Board (NAMB) is the domestic missions agency of the Southern Baptist Convention (SBC). It is involved in Southern Baptist church planting and revitalization, coordinating one of the United States's largest disaster relief agencies through the cooperation of state Baptist relief agencies, creating evangelism resources and other programs such as chaplaincy support and pastoral training. NAMB is headquartered in Alpharetta, Georgia.

== Leadership ==
The first NAMB president in 1997 was Robert Reccord. Citing “honest philosophical and methodological differences,” Bob Reccord resigned as NAMB president in April 2006.

The following president of NAMB was Geoff Hammond, who was elected by a unanimous vote in March 2007. Hammond resigned in August 2009 after an all-day closed session meeting with over 50 trustees.

In September 2010, Kevin Ezell was elected president. Ezell was formerly pastor of Highview Baptist Church in Louisville, KY.

== See also ==
- Southern Baptist Convention
- International Mission Board
