= Steve Gaines (pastor) =

American pastor (1957–2026)

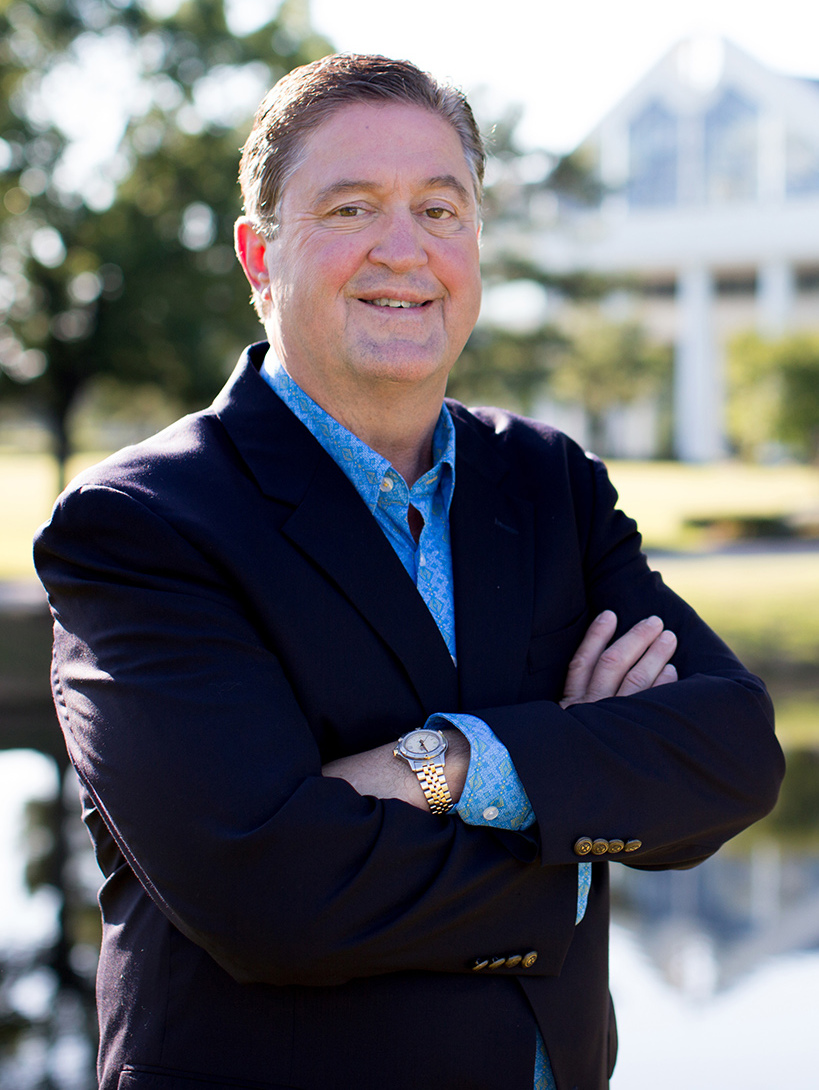
- Church: Bellevue Baptist Church
- Installed: 2005

Personal details
- Born: John Steven Gaines; December 31, 1957 Corinth, Mississippi, U.S.
- Died: March 20, 2026 (aged 68) Memphis, Tennessee, U.S.
- Denomination: Baptist (Southern Baptist Convention)
- Spouse: Donna Dodds
- Children: 4
- Occupation: Pastor, 61st President of the Southern Baptist Convention (June 15, 2016 – June 13, 2018)
- Education: Union University; Southwestern Baptist Theological Seminary

John Steven Gaines (December 31, 1957 – March 20, 2026) was an American Southern Baptist pastor who had served as the president of the Southern Baptist Convention. He resigned as senior pastor on September 22, 2024, to pursue an itinerant preaching ministry at Bellevue Baptist Church in Cordova (a suburb of Memphis, Tennessee), one of the largest congregations in the Southern Baptist Convention and had visited Israel 16 times. On Sunday, July 10, 2005, the Pastor Search Committee of Bellevue Baptist Church presented Steve Gaines to the church congregation. At the conclusion of the services, the Bellevue family overwhelmingly voted to call Steve Gaines as the seventh Pastor of Bellevue Baptist Church. Gaines succeeded the longtime Bellevue pastor Adrian Rogers.

Before arriving at Bellevue Baptist, Gaines pastored for 14 years at the Gardendale First Baptist Church, an 8,500-member church in suburban Birmingham, Alabama. There he became one of the leading voices in the conservative wing of the SBC. In 2004, Gaines was elected president of the Southern Baptist Pastors' Conference, and was the keynote speaker at the SBC annual meeting in Nashville. He served with his predecessor at Bellevue and three-time SBC president, Adrian Rogers, on a committee charged with revising The Baptist Faith and Message. The document, which is the primary doctrinal statement for all SBC agencies, including its six seminaries and International Mission Board, was adopted by the SBC in 2000. On March 9, 2016, Johnny Hunt announced he would nominate Gaines to be President of the Southern Baptist Convention at the upcoming SBC annual meeting in St. Louis, Missouri. He was elected, and then re-elected for a second one-year term at the 2017 annual meeting in Phoenix, Arizona.

Gaines' theology was best described as conservative and evangelical.

== Early life ==
Born to parents Edgar and Dorothy Gaines, Steve and his only sibling, Ed, spent most of their youth in the small town of Dyersburg, Tennessee. Their father worked for the Illinois Central Railroad and retired in 1976 as a track supervisor. Their mother founded and supervised a janitorial business in Dyersburg, for which both Gaines and his brother worked. He was baptized at First Baptist Church in Dyersburg.

During his senior year at Dyersburg High School, Gaines was selected as first team defensive end in his high school's "Big Ten Conference" and as All-District in track. He entered the University of Tennessee at Martin (UTM) on a full football scholarship in the fall of 1975. By the third game of his freshman season, he shared a starting defensive end position with a senior teammate. At UTM, he began attending weekly meetings of the Fellowship of Christian Athletes. In the fall of 1977, he gave up his football scholarship to transfer to Union University, a Christian college in Jackson, Tennessee. On October 23, 1977, Steve Gaines was licensed to the Gospel ministry by his home church in Dyersburg.

== Family ==
At Union University, Gaines met Memphian Donna Dodds, a campus leader who was selected as Miss Union University. Their first date was in December 1978, and they were married on June 14, 1980. Donna Gaines is a Bible teacher and author who leads women's ministries at Bellevue and speaks at churches and conferences across the nation. She has a Master's of Education from Texas Woman's University in Denton, Texas, and is board certified as an educational diagnostician. Steve and Donna Gaines have four children.

== Education ==
After graduating from Union University in 1979, Gaines began studies for a Master of Divinity degree at Southwestern Baptist Theological Seminary in Fort Worth, Texas. For seven years he served as Roy Fish's grader, longer than anyone else to ever hold that position. In the final year of his master's program, the seminary preaching faculty awarded Steve with the H. C. Brown, Jr. Preaching Award for "Outstanding Achievement in the Study and Practice of Preaching." At the same time, the evangelism faculty presented him with the W. Fred Swank Evangelism Award for best demonstrating the spirit of evangelism as a graduating student. Fred Swank was the legendary pastor of Sagamore Hill Baptist Church in Fort Worth, Texas.

He was the only Southwestern Seminary graduate to ever receive both awards. For Senior Preaching Week, Gaines was selected to preach in the seminary's chapel services before his professors and peers. He graduated with his Master's of Divinity on May 11, 1984.

He began doctoral seminars at Southwestern in the fall of 1985, majoring in preaching and minoring in evangelism. Fish's course on The History of Spiritual Awakenings particularly inspired him to pray and seek genuine revival for America. His doctoral dissertation was entitled, "An Analysis of the Correlation between Representative Baptist Hour Sermons by Herschel H. Hobbs and Selected Articles of The Baptist Faith and Message." He graduated from Southwestern Seminary with a Ph.D. on May 10, 1991.

== Ministry ==
On July 27, 1980, Steve was ordained to the Gospel ministry at First Baptist Church, Dyersburg. In 1978, he became youth pastor at First Baptist Church in Milan, Tennessee, where he served for a little more than two years before beginning studies at Southwestern Seminary. While a student at Southwestern Seminary, he was associate pastor/youth minister at Lake Shore Baptist Church in Lake Dallas, Texas. When the pastor resigned, he was asked to serve as the church's interim pastor, and six months later the church called him as pastor. The church grew steadily during the next five years, adding an educational wing and renovating the church facility. The church also planted Shady Shores Baptist Church in Shady Shores, Texas, during Gaines' tenure as pastor there.

After eight years in Texas, Gaines returned to Jackson, Tennessee, in 1988 to serve as pastor of West Jackson Baptist Church. In 1991, First Baptist Church in Gardendale, Alabama, called him to be the pastor. For 14 years of his ministry at Gardendale, the church membership grew exponentially. For the Easter 2005, services were held at the Birmingham–Jefferson Civic Center where more than 10,000 people attended.

== Involvement with Bellevue ==
While serving in Alabama, Steve was an annual guest speaker at Bellevue Baptist Church in Memphis, Tennessee, at the invitation of Pastor Adrian Rogers. After Rogers' retirement in 2005, the church voted to call Gaines as pastor. On July 10, 2005, Gaines accepted the call and preached to more than 10,000 people in two morning worship services. He preached his first sermon as pastor on September 11, 2005. Numerical growth in every area of the church's life marked Gaines' first year at Bellevue, but the church experienced leadership transition difficulties in the second year.

=== Bellevue Loves Memphis ===
In 2007, Gaines initiated a church-wide, ongoing volunteer ministry to Memphis and the community. On September 28, 2009, the State of Tennessee House of Representatives issued a proclamation recognizing Bellevue as an institution that has demonstrated "unflagging capacity for love, dedication of spirit, and faith in God" and for enriching the lives of people in their community. The proclamation cited pastor Gaines' for leading the way in showing "Jesus' love to the City of Memphis by meeting practical needs of residents" and for "embracing Bellevue Loves Memphis as a way of life." The document mentioned the church's sponsor of a Christian Mobile Dental Clinic that provides free dental care to the underprivileged, and the church's funding of The Vue, a ministry for college students located near the University of Memphis and accessible to students of other local colleges and universities. The proclamation noted that on six workdays, 5,300 volunteers have contributed between 30,000-35,000 hours through yard work, painting, construction, and more to benefit 40 schools, two post-secondary schools, 44 churches, 55 family homes, 14 parks, nine city/government buildings, 16 hospitals, 47 ministries, and ten Memphis City School football fields. The proclamation also noted that Bellevue Loves Memphis provided every city fire station with a copy of the movie Fireproof, assisted with the City of Memphis cleanup, and assisted with ten block parties. The document also recognized the church for hosting the Tennessee Technology Center's 2008–2009 graduation. The church has also opened its facilities for city and county school in-service meetings and for city and county school graduation ceremonies.

== Recognition ==
In April 2009, Gaines was honored with the "Open Door Award" by the April 4 foundation. This was in recognition "His passion for evangelism (which) has galvanized his congregation to reach their city with the Gospel in unprecedented ways by meeting practical needs throughout Memphis."

=== Southern Baptist Convention ===
On March 10, 2016, Pastor Johnny Hunt of FBC Woodstock (Georgia) announced his intentions to nominate Gaines for president of the Southern Baptist Convention. "When Steve Gaines shared his prayer journey he and [his wife] Donna had travelled, I was touched by his clear call to allow himself to be nominated", said Pastor Hunt in a news release. He later stated that he intended to nominate Pastor Gaines for the position at the annual SBC meeting in St. Louis. "With such a passionate desire for spiritual revival in our churches and nation, and knowing him to be a man of deep intense prayer, it brings joy to my heart to nominate Dr. Gaines" Pastor Hunt told the Baptist Press in his closing remarks.

== Handling of minister misconduct ==
On December 18, 2006, the church announced that a minister and staffer at the church for thirty-four years had been placed on leave with an investigation pending regarding a "moral failure", identified by Gaines and others as alleged child molestation in the 1980s. The staffer reportedly counseled child molestation victims during his employment at Bellevue and was permitted to continue having contact with children at the church after the allegation was revealed to Gaines. The next day, December 19, Gaines released a statement that acknowledged that he had been aware of the allegation since June 2006 but that he did not address it for several months because the staffer had been attending professional counseling and also because of confidentiality concerns and compassion for the staffer. The same day, Michael Spradlin, who is president of Mid-America Baptist Theological Seminary (located across the street from Bellevue's campus), told the Commercial Appeal that "[i]f a minister has first hand knowledge of allegations of child molestation and does nothing about it then that minister should resign." On December 20, 2006, Gaines addressed several hundred members of his congregation, saying he would like to remain pastor at Bellevue. On January 28, 2007, a church committee released a report on the incident. The report noted that the victim (the former staffer's son) had personally come forward to Gaines along with a group of friends to reveal the sexual abuse. The report criticized Gaines for not immediately coming forward with the information related to the alleged abuse, either to the church or to authorities. No criminal charges were ever brought regarding the allegations.

In May 2022, Guidepost Solutions released an independent report stating that Gaines allegedly admitted that he "had delayed reporting a staff minister’s prior sexual abuse of a child of “heartfelt concern and compassion for th[e] minister,” while acknowledging that he should have “brought it to the attention of our church leadership immediately.”

== Death ==
Gaines died from kidney cancer on March 20, 2026, at the age of 68.

== Books authored ==
- Morning Manna, a 365-day devotional book (2003)
- When God Comes to Church (2007)
- Pray Like It Matters (2014)
- Share Jesus Like It Matters (2016)

== See also ==
- List of Southern Baptist Convention affiliated people
- Southern Baptist Convention
- Southern Baptist Convention Presidents

Religious titles
Preceded by Adrian Rogers	Senior Pastor of Bellevue Baptist Church; 2005–2025	Succeeded by Ben Mandrell
Preceded by Ronnie Floyd	President of the Southern Baptist Convention; 2016–2018	Succeeded by J.D. Greear
