= President of the Southern Baptist Convention =

The president of the Southern Baptist Convention heads the convention and is elected at the annual meeting. The president's duties include presiding over the annual meeting; appointing members to SBC committees; serving as an ex officio member of the board of SBC entities including the International Mission Board, the North American Mission Board, and Lifeway Christian Resources; and representing the SBC to other Baptist denominations and to the press.

Although the SBC Bylaws do not specifically state that only a male may be elected as president, no female has ever served as such (the majority of presidents have been pastors of churches, which according to the Baptist Faith and Message, the office of pastor is limited to men only). Any person may be nominated and there is no requirement that a candidate announce their intent to run prior to the annual meeting (during the 2022 Annual Meeting, three candidates announced their intent to run, and a fourth candidate was nominated at the annual meeting). If only one candidate is nominated, the secretary of the SBC (or any designee) may cast the ballot. If three or more candidates are nominated, and no candidate receives a majority on the first ballot, subsequent ballots shall carry all candidates in the top 50 percent of the prior ballot. Proxy voting is not allowed.

Under SBC Bylaws, the term is for one year, and a candidate can serve a maximum of two consecutive terms, after which he must sit out a year before standing for re-election. Prior to the current bylaws, presidents could serve more than two terms and frequently did: P.H. Mell served a total of 16 years (over two terms spanning eight years each), the most of any president. The service year overlaps with two calendar years as the annual meeting is held in June, and the term starts upon completion of the annual meeting (thus, at the annual meeting, the incumbent president serves until the annual meeting concludes, after which the elected president—whether incumbent or new—will begin his term).

Since the advent of the current bylaws, the custom has been for the president to serve two consecutive terms, but not run again after the one-year stand-down period; however, it is not uncommon for a president to serve only one term and then step down and not run again. But, two persons have served as president for more than the customary two terms since that time:

- Adrian Rogers served as president for a single term in 1979–1980 and then again for two consecutive terms in 1987–1988 and 1988–1989.
- When the 2020 Annual Meeting was cancelled for the first time in 75 years due to the COVID-19 pandemic, incumbent president J.D. Greear's term was extended to a third year despite the normal term limit, since his replacement could not be elected until the next meeting.

== List ==
No.	Image	President	Years in Office	State
1		William Bullein Johnson	1845–1851	South Carolina
2		R. B. C. Howell	1851–1859	Virginia and Tennessee
3		Richard Fuller	1859–1863	South Carolina
4		Patrick H. Mell	1863–1872	Georgia
5		James P. Boyce	1872–1880	South Carolina and Kentucky
6		Patrick H. Mell	1880–1888	Georgia
7		James P. Boyce	1888–1889	Kentucky
8		Jonathan Haralson	1889–1899	Alabama
9		William J. Northen	1899–1902	Georgia
10		James Philip Eagle	1902–1905	Arkansas
11		Edwin William Stephens	1905–1908	Missouri
12		Joshua Levering	1908–1911	Maryland
13		Edwin C. Dargan	1911–1914	Georgia
14		Lansing Burrows	1914–1917	Georgia
15		James Bruton Gambrell	1917–1921	Texas
16		Edgar Young Mullins	1921–1924	Kentucky
17		George W. McDaniel	1924–1927	Virginia
18		George W. Truett	1927–1930	Texas
19		William Joseph McGlothin	1930–1932	South Carolina
20		Fred Fernando Brown	1932–1933	Tennessee
21		Monroe E. Dodd	1933–1935	Louisiana
22		John R. Sampey	1935–1938	Kentucky
23		Lee Rutland Scarborough	1938–1940	Texas
24		William Wistar Hamilton	1940–1942	Louisiana
25		Pat Morris Neff	1942–1946	Texas
26		Louie D. Newton	1946–1948	Georgia
27		Robert G. Lee	1948–1951	Tennessee
28		J. D. Grey	1951–1953	Louisiana
29		James Wilson Storer	1953–1955	Oklahoma
30		Casper Carl Warren	1955–1957	North Carolina
31		Brooks Hays	1957–1959	Arkansas
32		Ramsey Pollard	1959–1961	Tennessee
33		Herschel Hobbs	1961–1963	Oklahoma
34		K. Owen White	1963–1964	Texas
35		W. Wayne Dehoney	1964–1966	Tennessee
36		H. Franklin Paschall	1966–1968	Tennessee
37		W. A. Criswell	1968–1970	Texas
38		Carl Bates	1970–1972	North Carolina
39		Lawrence Owen Cooper Sr.	1972–1974	Mississippi
40		Jaroy Weber	1974–1976	Alabama
41		James L. Sullivan	1976–1977	Tennessee
42		Jimmy Allen	1977–1979	Texas
43		Adrian Rogers	1979–1980	Tennessee
44		Bailey Smith	1980–1982	Oklahoma
45		James T. Draper Jr.	1982–1984	Texas
46		Charles Stanley	1984–1986	Georgia
47		Adrian Rogers	1986–1988	Tennessee
48		Jerry Vines	1988–1990	Florida
49		Morris Chapman	1990–1992	Texas
50		Homer Edwin Young	1992–1994	Texas
51		Jim Henry	1994–1996	Florida
52		Tom Elliff	1996–1998	Oklahoma
53		Paige Patterson	1998–2000	Texas
54		James Merritt	2000–2002	Georgia
55		Jack Graham	2002–2004	Texas
56		Bobby Welch	2004-2006	Florida
57		Frank S. Page	2006–2008	South Carolina
58		Johnny M. Hunt	2008–2010	Georgia
59		Bryant Wright	2010–2012	Georgia
60		Fred Luter	2012–2014	Louisiana
61		Ronnie Floyd	2014–2016	Arkansas
62		Steve Gaines	2016–2018	Tennessee
63		J. D. Greear	2018–2021	North Carolina
64		Ed Litton	2021–2022	Alabama
65		Bart Barber	2022–2024	Texas
66		Clint Pressley	2024–2026	North Carolina
67		Willy Rice	2026–present	Florida

== See also ==
- List of Southern Baptist Convention affiliated people
