= Hickory Grove Christian School =

American Christian private school in North Carolina

Location
- 6050 Hickory Grove Road; Charlotte, North Carolina 28215; United States; 35°13′20″N 80°43′31″W

Information
- Type: Private; day; college-preparatory; Christian School
- Religious affiliation: Christianity
- Denomination: Baptist
- Founded: 1995 (31 years ago)
- Head of school: Dr. Jimmie Quesinberry
- Staff: 120 staff members including teachers
- Faculty: 105 full- and part-time teachers
- Grades: TK–12
- Gender: Co-educational
- Enrollment: 800
- Colors: Navy & gold
- Athletics: North Carolina Independent Schools Athletic Association (NCISAA)
- Sports: 30 Athletic teams
- Mascot: Lion
- Nickname: Lions
- Accreditation: SACS; ACSI
- Tuition: $11,500–$13,750
- Affiliations: Hickory Grove Baptist Church
- Website: www.hgchristian.org

Hickory Grove Christian School (HGCS) is a private, college-preparatory Christian school located in Charlotte, North Carolina and consists of an early education center, elementary school, middle school, and high school. It was founded in 1995 by the leadership of Hickory Grove Baptist Church.

== History ==
In 1995, Hickory Grove Baptist Church started its school as a K–2 school, and each year added a grade until 2004, when HGCS graduated its first class of seniors.

== School facts ==
HGCS consists of TK–12 grades consisting Elementary School (TK–5), Middle School (6th–8th), and High School (9th–12th). The School incorporates athletics, technology and fine arts into the academic schedule. For the current 2015–2016 school year, the school enrolled 800 students (292 in Elementary School, 197 in Middle School, and 311 in High School).

=== Accreditation and memberships ===
HGCS is accredited by the Southern Association of Colleges and Schools (SACS) and is a member of the Association of Christian Schools International (ACSI).

=== Organization and Administration ===
The school, a non-profit organization, is composed of four educational divisions: Early Education Center, Elementary School, Middle School, and High School with individual principals.

=== Faculty ===
The TK–12 school has 87 faculty and staff members, 38 in Elementary School, 16 in Middle School and 33 in High School. 79 of which are full- and part-time teachers. The average K–12 full-time faculty member has 14 years of classroom experience, with 22 percent having attained advanced degrees. The school staff also includes a full-time athletic director, admissions director, finance director, guidance counselor, and school nurse.

== Academics ==
The High School offers a full honors track as well as 11 AP classes including English Language and Composition, English Literature and Composition, Biology, Chemistry, Physics I, Statistics, Calculus AB, US History, US Government and Politics, Human Geography and Computer Science.

In May 2015, 79 HGCS students took a total of 128 Advanced Placement exams with 16 students earning a 5 on one or more AP Exams; 24 students earned a 4 on one or more AP Exams; 31 students earned a 3 on one or more AP Exams. The mean SAT scores for the Class of 2015 were: Critical Reading – 521, Mathematics – 516, and Writing – 517, SAT score of 1037, and total composite score of 1554. The mean ACT scores for the Class of 2015 were: English – 24.3, Mathematics – 22.8, Reading – 22.8, and Science – 23.3, and a total composite score of 23.7.

In 2015, 96% of HGCS graduates went on to attend colleges/universities; 20% of those began their college career in a two year program; 4% of HGCS graduates entered the military.

Starting in January 2016, HGCS High School students have the opportunity for a concurrent dual enrollment agreement with The College at Southeastern.

== Athletics ==
HGCS offers 28 teams participating in 14 different sports beginning in the sixth grade.

HGCS is a member of the North Carolina Independent Schools Athletic Association (NCISAA). Varsity teams compete at the 3A level and are members of the Metrolina Athletic Conference (MAC). Since joining the NCISAA in 2002, the school has 7 State Championships .

Sports include football, men's and women's soccer, volleyball, cheerleading, cross country, men's and women's basketball, swimming, men's and women's tennis, baseball, softball and golf.
