= Louie De Votie Newton =

American pastor (1892–1986)

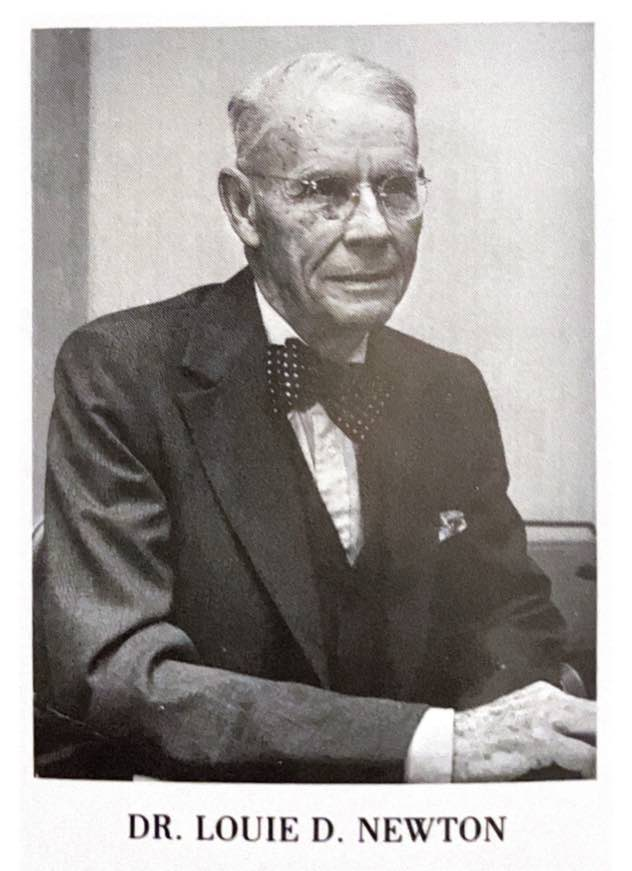

Louie DeVotie Newton (27 April 1892 – 3 June 1986) was President of the Southern Baptist Convention (1947–1948) in the United States, Baptist preacher, and author, as well as vice president of the Baptist World Alliance.

== Biography ==
Newton was born in Screven County, Georgia on April 27, 1892. He was raised on his parents' farm, and in July 1902 was baptized in a stream near Union Baptist Church. He graduated from Mercer University in 1913 and then taught history at the university before earning a master's degree in journalism from Columbia University. He joined the U.S. Army in 1917, and taught soldiers at camps near Macon during the First World War. From 1920 to 1929 Newton edited the Georgia Baptist Convention’s Christian Index newspaper. In 1936 Newton started writing a daily column titled "Good Morning" for the Atlanta Constitution and Savannah Morning News, while writing weekly columns for the Christian Index. He also published several books. Newton broadcast a radio show on WGST-Atlanta from 1929 until his death.

== Religious life ==
Newton became pastor of Druid Hills Baptist Church in Atlanta, Georgia in 1929. He initially resisted the offer of this position since he was only a layman, but was persuaded to accept and was ordained on April 20, 1929, just before his thirty-seventh birthday. In 1943 he was a co-founder of the Georgia Temperance League. In 1946, soon after the end of the Second World War, he was elected president of the Southern Baptist Convention, serving from 1947 to 1948.

In the summer of 1946 Joseph Stalin invited Newton to visit Russia on a five-week tour, to meet with leaders of the Union of Evangelical Christians-Baptists of Russia and investigate the status of its two million Baptists. Newton reported that the churches were open seven days a week, carrying on highly active programs of religious instruction, culture and recreation. He received a certain amount of criticism for the positive statements about Russia he made on his return, with some accusing him of communist sympathies, others of naivety and still another of "intellectual inadequacy."

Newton was president of the Georgia Baptist Convention in 1950 and 1951. Later he was vice president of the Baptist World Alliance. He retired as pastor of the Druid Hills Baptist Church in October 1968.

== Death and legacy ==
Newton died of pneumonia in 1986 at the age of 94.

He is the namesake of Newton Hall, a large chapel on the Mercer University campus in Macon.

== Archival Collections ==
Newton's personal effects and correspondences are divided between two archives. The vast majority of his papers, awards, and ephemera are held at the Mercer University Special Collections and Archives in Macon, Georgia.

The rest of his correspondences, specifically those dealing with his presidency of the Southern Baptist Convention (and consequently much of his correspondences dealing with the Russia trip), as well as many of his recorded sermons are held at the Southern Baptist Historical Library and Archive.

== See also ==
- List of Southern Baptist Convention affiliated people
- Southern Baptist Convention
- Southern Baptist Convention Presidents

== Bibliography ==
- Louie DeVotie Newton (1938). Good Morning. Broadman Press.
- Louie DeVotie Newton, Garfield Bromley Oxnam (1947). An American churchman in the Soviet Union. American Russian Institute.
- Louie DeVotie Newton (1948). Amazing Grace: The Life of M. N. McCall. Home Mission Board, Southern Baptist Convention.
- Louie DeVotie Newton (1948). A Brief History of the Ten by The Scribe. The Ten Club.
- Louie DeVotie Newton (1957). Why I am a Baptist. T. Nelson.
- Louie DeVotie Newton (1958). Fifty golden years: the Atlanta Association of Baptist Churches, 1909-1958. Atlanta Association of Baptist Churches.

Preceded by Pat Neff	President of the Southern Baptist Convention; 1947–1948	Succeeded by Robert G. Lee
