= Germantown Baptist Church =

Baptist megachurch based in Germantown, Tennessee

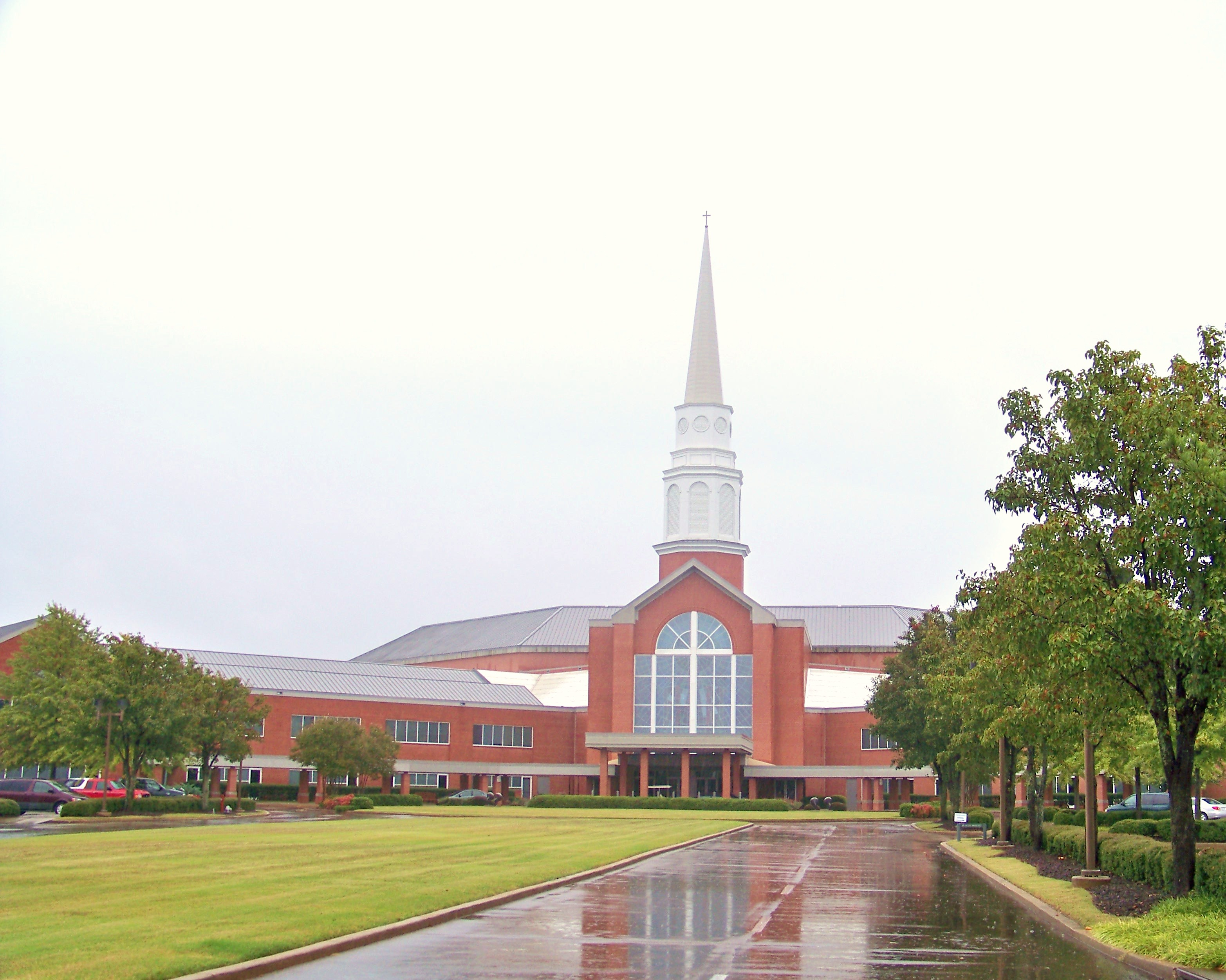
Germantown Baptist Church

Germantown Baptist Church is a Baptist megachurch based in Germantown, Tennessee, affiliated with the Southern Baptist Convention. The church is 179 years old, and since its founding has moved from its location in downtown Germantown to an over 300,000-square-foot (28,000 m^{2}) building complex on a 64-acre (260,000 m^{2}) campus near the border of Germantown and Collierville on Poplar Avenue. The original building for the church still stands on Germantown Road. Built twenty-one years before the beginning of the Civil War, Germantown Baptist Church is the second oldest church in the city of Germantown.

== History ==
=== Pre-Civil War ===
Western Tennessee was still Indian Territory until 1819, but soon after that date Shelby County was open to settlers. By 1825, a Kentuckian, William Twyford, had settled on the banks of the Wolf River, near the Neshoba area. Early records of the church were destroyed by fire on a couple of occasions. The earliest reference concerning the church is in the September 1838 issue of "The Baptist" (now "Baptist and Reflector"). It was named New Hope Church in 1838 before the incorporation of Germantown; and in that year the church reported a revival in which 49 members united with the church, including 45 for baptism. Also in 1838, the church petitioned to be seated at the meeting of the "Big Hatchie Association" and reported a membership of 69.

Early in December 1841, Mr. Wilks Brooks deeded a plot of ground next to the church. The Brooks family was active in the church for many years. Joseph Brooks and wife Agnes later donated the church parsonage. On December 30, Germantown received its charter of incorporation, and the name of the church was changed. In 1842, the church was listed in the Association as Germantown Baptist Church, with Reverend L. H. Bethel as Minister, James Brooks and J. B. Winders as messengers. The membership had grown to 84 (70 whites and 14 blacks). The church had a Bible class, and that year was host to the Big Hatchie Association. By 1845, the last year that Reverend Bethel's name appeared, the membership had grown to 132 (98 whites and 34 blacks).

A report in "The Appeal" dated July 23, 1862, reported "The little town of Germantown has been sacked and burned by a band of stragglers from the Federal Army." Both Germantown Methodist and Germantown Baptist churches were burned. A neighbor upon seeing the church burning, sent a servant to request the pulpit Bible. The request was granted and has been preserved to the present.

=== Post-Civil War ===
After the Civil War, the church was at a low ebb. The building had been destroyed and many members had been lost in the war or had moved away. The membership had dropped to 40. Elder W. W. Keep, the pastor, continued to visit and filled the pulpit monthly. He plus the Vasser and Brooks families continued to encourage the membership to rebuild and helped secure from the United States Government a payment as partial value for the burned church building. In 1870, the church members moved into a rebuilt sanctuary. The seating was quite different in that period: the ladies entered one door and sat on one side of the sanctuary. The men entered the other door and sat on the opposite side. The deacons sat down near the front and gave out their "amens."

The first record of a church Sunday School Superintendent was in 1883 when J. M. Scott's name was listed. The first clerk listed was P. N. Overton. The church received special attention in the Association in 1885 when under the ministry of Reverend J. D. Anderson, it was the "only church to report two weekly prayer meetings." On the 4th Lord's Day in January 1891, there was a special meeting of the membership at which the pastor, Reverend J. W. Porter, read a communication from Sister Agnes Brooks proposing to build and donate a parsonage for the church. At the same meeting, Mr. Joseph Brooks donated a lot to the church, and the members agreed that each would furnish a wagon and team to haul the materials needed to build.

In 1932, a brick addition to the rear of the sanctuary was completed. The church membership was 141, and there were 116 enrolled in Sunday School.

=== Dr. Ken Story's Years ===
When Reverend Ken Story began his ministry in 1964, the church membership was 210. In 1973, a temporary sanctuary was built with seating for 535. The membership in 1973 was 1,223. In addition to the Pastor, the church had a full-time staff that included a Director of Education, Mr. Emmett Wade; a Director of Music and Youth, Mr. Bill Spencer; Secretaries, Nena Harper and Cheryl Rogers; and a Custodian, Harold Weddington.

In 1974, it became apparent that Germantown Baptist needed a larger sanctuary and the church purchased 3 acres (12,000 m^{2}) on the east side of its existing lot. In 1975, membership and attendance increased so dramatically that the church had to return to two services and two Sunday School hours in spite of the additional room provided by the interim sanctuary. On March 14, 1975, a ground breaking ceremony was held for a church gymnasium called the Christian Family Center. In January 1977, the Christian Family Center was opened. The new space resulted in an immediate increase in Sunday School attendance and new recreational programs.

Early in 1978, the church became actively involved in the Billy Graham Crusade. Charles Baker served on the Crusade Steering Committee. Ken Story chaired the Crusade Counseling and Follow-up Committee. The church approved the design for a new sanctuary for 1,250 people in August. A new Home Bible Study ministry also began in 1978 to reach the unchurched in Germantown. At first, there were 4 home groups, but within three years the ministry had increased to 8 groups with more than 200 people involved.

On Easter Sunday in 1979, the Lord's Supper and baptisms were observed at 7:15 AM followed by three Sunday School hours and three worship services. The year 1980 was expected to be a very hard year for the church with the construction of the new sanctuary. The deacons designated it "The Year of Prayer and Preparation." As anticipated, the building project disrupted the church's routine activities; parts of the parking lot were used for storage and rooms for meetings were scarce. The little parsonage across the street from the church had to be used for Sunday School classes. In spite of all these obstacles, the activities of the church continued to expand. A World Mission Conference was held; a Fall Revival began where the Spring Revival left off; and three new staff members were added: Danny Wilson, David Burton, and Gary Ellis. The following year, 1981, was climactic; under Dr. Story's leadership the church experienced great spiritual victories. In May, the 1280 seat sanctuary was completed, and on the first day of occupancy was filled to capacity.

=== New Campus ===
The old campus was purchased by some anonymous donors and donated to Mid-America Baptist Theological Seminary after the move to new facility, in 1995.

The new campus is a 64 acres (260,000 m^{2}) campus that includes a 3,000 seat sanctuary, two class-room buildings, a recreation complex with two basketball courts, a game room, a weight room, cardio room, running track and racquetball courts, called the CORE, a dining room and small lunch restaurant, library, music theater, baseball fields and nearby soccer fields, and a multi media conference center.

Dr. Charles Fowler became senior pastor in 2010. Dr. Matt Brown became senior pastor in 2021.

== Ministry ==
The church has sent out numerous missionaries, creating an inner-city ministry that reaches out to impoverished communities in neighboring Memphis, Tennessee, and initiated many other programs that have been praised and replicated by other churches across the United States.
