= Brooks Hays =

American politician (1898-1981)

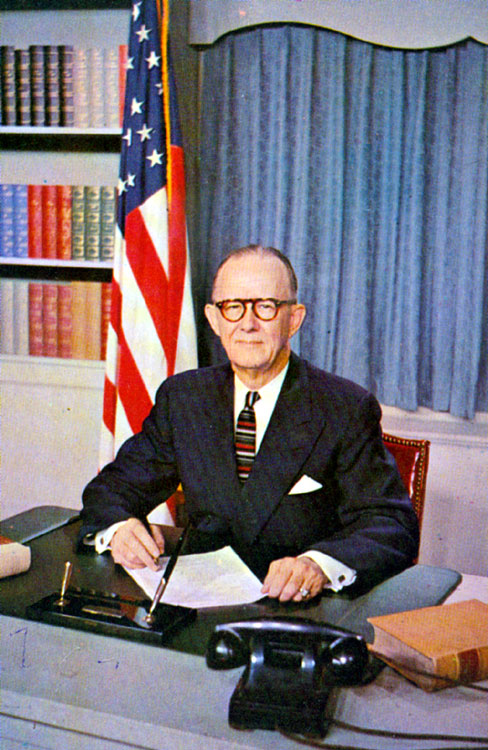

Member of the U.S. House of Representatives from Arkansas's 5th district
- In office January 3, 1943 – January 3, 1959
- Preceded by: David D. Terry
- Succeeded by: Dale Alford

31st President of the Southern Baptist Convention
- In office 1958–1959
- Preceded by: C. C. Warren
- Succeeded by: Ramsey Pollard

7th Assistant Secretary of State for Legislative Affairs
- In office February 28, 1961 – December 3, 1961
- Preceded by: William B. Macomber Jr.
- Succeeded by: Fred Dutton

Personal details
- Born: Lawrence Brooks Hays; August 9, 1898 London, Arkansas, U.S.
- Died: October 11, 1981 (aged 83) Chevy Chase, Maryland, U.S.
- Party: Democratic
- Education: University of Arkansas; George Washington University Law School

Lawrence Brooks Hays (August 9, 1898 – October 11, 1981) was an American lawyer and politician who served eight terms as a Democratic member of the United States House of Representatives from the State of Arkansas from 1943 to 1959. He was also a president of the Southern Baptist Convention.

== Biography ==
Brooks Hays was born in London, Pope County, Arkansas, on August 9, 1898. He attended public schools in Russellville, Arkansas. Hays served in the United States Army in 1918. After leaving the service he earned a degree from the University of Arkansas at Fayetteville in 1919. He attended law school at George Washington University, becoming a member of the Sigma Chi fraternity, earning his law degree in 1922, after which he was admitted to the bar. Hays returned to Russellville and opened a private law practice.

=== Political career ===
Hays served as assistant attorney general of Arkansas from 1925 to 1927. Hays ran for the Democratic gubernatorial nomination in 1928 and 1930, but was unsuccessful both times.

He served as a Democratic National committeeman for Arkansas from 1932 to 1939. With the arrival of the New Deal, Hays was appointed as a labor compliance officer for the National Recovery Administration in Arkansas in 1934. He served as assistant to the administrator of resettlement in 1935 and held administrative and legal positions in the Farm Security Administration from 1936 to 1942.

Hays ran for the United States House of Representatives and was elected to the Seventy-eighth Congress. He was re-elected seven times and served from January 3, 1943 – January 3, 1959.

In 1953, Hays sponsored House Resolution 60, to create within the Capitol building, "a place of retreat as an encouragement to prayer." This followed a trend of religious legislation which had manifested the previous year in the establishment of the National Day of Prayer, and would continue in following years with the insertion of the words "under God" into the Pledge of Allegiance (1954), and the addition of "In God We Trust" to the national currency (1955). 1953 also saw the inception of the Presidential Prayer Breakfast, later renamed the National Prayer Breakfast, an event sponsored by International Christian Leadership, also known as The Family. Hays, whom The Washington Post's Drew Pearson described in a June 20, 1954, column as "one of the foremost experts in psychological warfare against communism," used his evangelical connections to help build a Christian conservative consensus in favor of the aggressive internationalism The Family called "Militant Liberty," an approach favored by internationalist Republicans and conservative Democrats.

== The 1958 election ==
The major issue of the day was President Dwight D. Eisenhower's sending in federal troops to integrate Central High School in Little Rock (see also Little Rock Integration Crisis). Most Arkansas politicians opposed the intervention, but Hays (D) tried to mediate the standoff between the federal government and Arkansas Gov. Orval Faubus. Hays was not an integrationist, and he had signed the 1956 anti-desegregation Southern Manifesto, but his actions inflamed segregationists in the state, who rallied around Amis Guthridge, attorney for several segregationist groups, in the Democratic primary. Guthridge was backed by the White Citizens Council and ran on a pro-segregation platform. Hays prevailed by a 3–2 margin in the primary. Then, with just a week to go before the November election, Dale Alford, a member of the Little Rock school board, launched a write-in bid against Hays. Backed by Faubus' allies, Alford won in a major upset by just over 1,200 votes (51–49 percent). It was only the third time in the 20th century that a write-in candidate won a congressional election.

== Post-congressional career ==
During his last term in Congress, Hays was elected to serve as the president of the Southern Baptist Convention for its 1957–1958 term. He was nominated by J. D. Grey, long-term pastor of the First Baptist Church of New Orleans. In that capacity, Hays traveled with Rev. Dr. Clarence Cranford, his pastor at Calvary Baptist Church in Washington, D.C., and president of the American Baptist Convention, to Moscow for a joint peace mission.

From 1959 to 1961, after his congressional tenure had ended, Hays served on the board of directors of the Tennessee Valley Authority. Hays served in the Kennedy administration as Assistant Secretary of State for congressional relations in 1961 and as Special Assistant to the President of the United States from late 1961 until February 1964.

Hays became a professor of political science at the Eagleton Institute at Rutgers University and a visiting professor of government at the University of Massachusetts Amherst. He served as director of the Ecumenical Institute at Wake Forest University from 1968 to 1970. In 1970 he was elected as co-chairman of Former Members of Congress, Inc. and served as the chairman of the Government Good Neighbor Council of North Carolina.

He also served on the board of directors of the National Conference on Citizenship in 1960.

In 1966, Hays ran unsuccessfully for the Democratic gubernatorial nomination in Arkansas. It was a crowded field of eight candidates, following 12 years of control by Governor Orval Faubus, who was stepping down. Hays finished third, ahead of the man who had defeated him as a write-in candidate in 1958, Dale Alford, but behind Frank Holt and "Justice Jim" Johnson. Johnson, the eventual party nominee, a former Arkansas Supreme Court justice from Conway and avowed segregationist, was defeated in the November general election by the Republican Winthrop Rockefeller of Morrilton.

In 1972 Hays was the Democratic nominee for election to the Ninety-third Congress as a representative from North Carolina, but lost to the Republican incumbent, Wilmer Mizell (also known as "Vinegar Bend" Mizell).

=== Death ===
With his career at an end, Hays took up residence in Chevy Chase, Maryland. He died on 11 October 1981 in Chevy Chase and was buried at Oakland Cemetery in Russellville, Arkansas.

== See also ==
- List of Southern Baptist Convention affiliated people
- Southern Baptist Convention
- Southern Baptist Convention Presidents

U.S. House of Representatives
Preceded by David D. Terry	Member of the U.S. House of Representatives from Arkansas's 5th congressional district 1943–1959	Succeeded by Dale Alford
Government offices
Preceded by William B. Macomber, Jr.	Assistant Secretary of State for Legislative Affairs; February 28, 1961 – December 3, 1961	Succeeded by Fred Dutton
Religious titles
Preceded by C. C. Warren	President of the Southern Baptist Convention; 1958–1959	Succeeded by Ramsey Pollard
