= J. D. Greear =

American Baptist minister

- Church: The Summit Church
- Installed: 2002

Orders
- Ordination: 1999

Personal details
- Born: James David Greear; May 1, 1973 (age 53)
- Denomination: Baptist (Southern Baptist Convention)
- Spouse: Veronica Greear
- Occupation: Pastor, President of the Southern Baptist Convention (June 13, 2018 – June 16, 2021)
- Education: Campbell University (BA); Southeastern Baptist Theological Seminary (MDiv, PhD)

James David "J.D." Greear (born May 1, 1973) is an American Baptist pastor. He is the pastor of The Summit Church in Durham, North Carolina. Greear has authored several books, including 12 Truths & a Lie (2023), Essential Christianity (2023), Just Ask (2021), What Are You Going to Do with Your Life? (2020), Above All (2019), Not God Enough (2018), Gaining by Losing (2015), Gospel (2011), Stop Asking Jesus into Your Heart (2013), and Jesus, Continued… (2014). He also hosts Summit Life, a half-hour daily radio broadcast and weekly TV program. He serves as a member of the Board of Directors of Chick-fil-A, serves as a Council member for The Gospel Coalition, and served as the 63rd president of the Southern Baptist Convention from 2018 to 2021.

== Early life and education ==
Greear grew up in Winston-Salem, North Carolina. He graduated from Word of Life Bible Institute and earned a Bachelor of Arts degree from Campbell University.

He entered the PhD program at Southeastern Baptist Theological Seminary in 1999, graduating in 2003 with a doctorate in philosophy, concentrating primarily on Christian and Islamic theology. His dissertation was titled Theosis and Muslim Evangelism: How the Recovery of a Patristic Understanding of Salvation Can Aid Evangelical Missionaries in the Evangelization of Islamic Peoples.

== Career ==
On July 18, 1999, Greear was ordained at Salem Baptist Church in Winston-Salem, the church he grew up in. In 2002, he became the pastor of what was then Homestead Heights Baptist Church in Durham. Soon afterward, Greear relaunched the church as The Summit Church. Within three years, the church had grown to the point that it had to sell its old facility and move services to Riverside High School in Durham.

Under Greear's leadership, the Summit has grown from a plateaued attendance of 300 to over 12,000. Currently, the church has 13 campuses across The Triangle.

In 2018, Greear became the president of the Southern Baptist Convention and was re-elected by acclamation for a second one-year term in 2019 in an uncontested election. His term in office was extended to a third year when the 2020 annual meeting of the SBC was cancelled due to the COVID-19 pandemic and a successor could not be elected.

Greear has sought to minister to sex abuse victims and offenders in the church that he pastors. According to him, the gospel message of Jesus, not national political purposes, should be the aim of Baptist churches.

| Preceded by Steve Gaines | President of the Southern Baptist Convention; 2018–21 | Succeeded by Ed Litton |
