= Jimmy Allen (pastor) =

American pastor (1927–2019)

Jimmy Raymond Allen
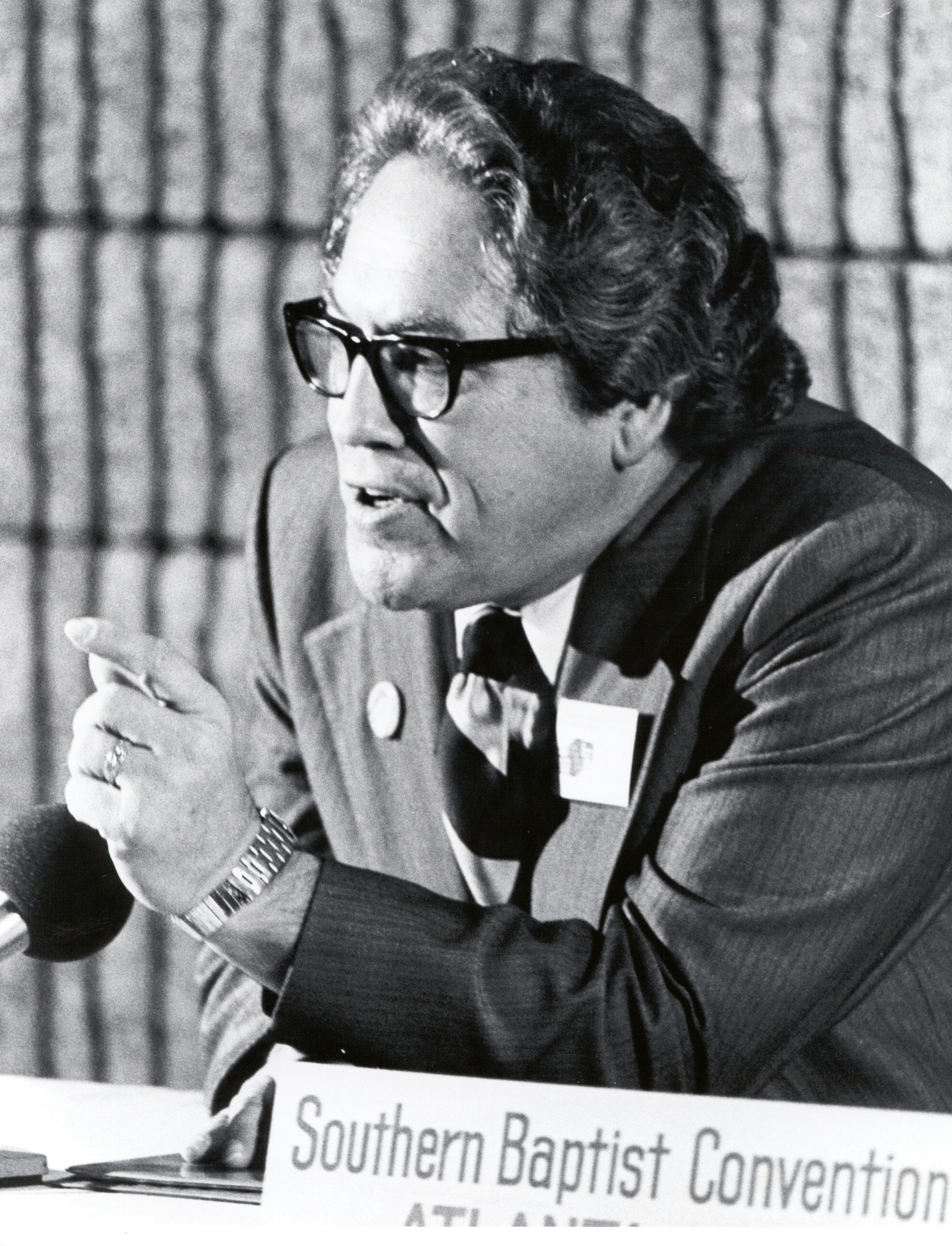
- Allen at the 1978 SBC General Convention
- Born: October 26, 1927; Hope, Arkansas, U.S.
- Died: January 8, 2019 (aged 91)
- Education: Howard Payne University (BA) Southwestern Baptist Theological Seminary (MDiv)
- Occupations: Pastor and President of the Southern Baptist Convention

Jimmy Raymond Allen (October 26, 1927 – January 8, 2019) was an American pastor who was President of the Southern Baptist Convention (SBC) from 1977 to 1979. As president of the SBC, Allen was noted for his moderation and commitment to compassion in the church and was the last president before the SBC's conservative resurgence. After leaving his post as president, he continued to serve in the SBC before eventually becoming involved in other baptist organizations.

== Early life and education ==
Allen was born on October 26, 1927, in Hope, Arkansas, but was raised in Texas. His father, Earl Allen, was a Baptist pastor. Allen attended Howard Payne University and Southwestern Baptist Theological Seminary.

== Career ==
Allen started his career serving local Texas churches as a pastor. In 1960, he was made executive director of the Texas Baptist Convention's Christian Life Commission, a role he served in until 1968 when he was elected the convention's president. In 1976, he endorsed Jimmy Carter for president, a move that Carter would later cite as instrumental in his winning Texas and, ultimately, the presidency.

In 1977, Allen was elected president of the SBC, the denomination's highest position of authority. Despite his conservative views on issues such as women's ordination and alcohol consumption, he described himself as "a social application progressive" committed to "social ministry." Shortly after his election, Allen became an active proponent of women's involvement in the SBC, arguing in favor of women's ordination and encouraging women to become more active in the church. At the 1978 SBC convention, he nominated fifteen women to the SBC's various committees. At that same convention he opposed anti-gay activist Anita Bryant's candidacy for the SBC's vice-presidency, claiming that the SBC needed to avoid having a singular focus on any one issue. In 1979, Allen chose not to run for re-election and was succeeded by Adrian Rogers. His final sermon as president, in which he affirmed his support for social welfare, human rights, and religious liberty, leading his biographer, Larry McSwain, to dub him "the last moderate Baptist president of the SBC."

After stepping down as president of the organization, Allen continued to be involved with the SBC for several years, preaching at churches and leading the SBC's radio and television commission. He quickly became critical of the SBC's conservative resurgence, however, telling the National Executive Council of the American Jewish Committee that it would cause damage to both religion and the government. Over the years he would drift apart from the SBC, helping to found the Cooperative Baptist Fellowship and the New Baptist Covenant.

== Political involvement ==
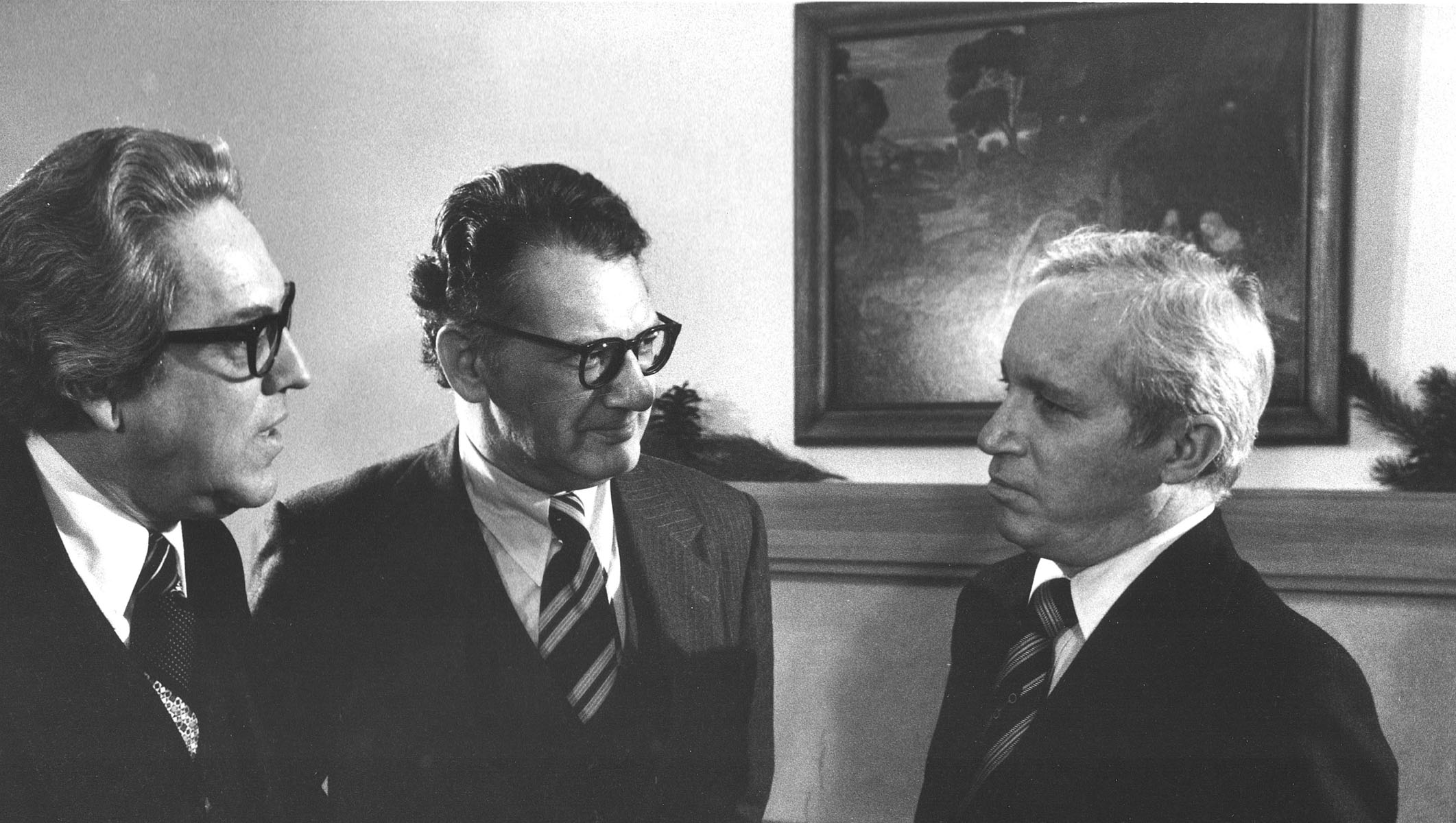
Jimmy Allen (on left) with Marc Tanenbaum and Frank Reynolds in 1978

Allen's presidency of the SBC coincided with the presidency of Jimmy Carter, who he had endorsed in the 1976 election, and the two maintained an open line of communication. Allen opposed the position of United States Ambassador to the Vatican and petitioned Jimmy Carter to end the position on the basis that it "amounted to special recognition of one individual faith." Allen also opposed the 1979 Iranian sanctions and unsuccessfully appealed against them to Carter. On December 25, 1979, Allen visited Iran with five other religious leaders and met with Ayatollah Ruhollah Khomeini, describing him as "a man of great principle." He supported the Strategic Arms Limitation Talks between the United States and the Soviet Union, but while the SBC had supported SALT I with a resolution in 1979, Allen was unable to build support for a similar resolution supporting SALT II in 1980.

== Personal life ==
Allen was married to Wanda Massey and had three sons: Michael, Skip, and Scott. In 1985, his son Scott's wife, Lydia, and children tested positive for HIV/AIDS after receiving a contaminated blood donation. His son Skip, a gay man, tested positive for AIDS separately. As a result of his family's diagnoses, Scott was fired from his job as an educational minister and his children were forced out of church daycares, forcing them to move back into Jimmy Allen's home. The struggles of Allen's family with AIDS led him to write Burden of a Secret, a short book meant to guide Christian families towards approaching AIDS victims with compassion. Allen died on January 8, 2019, at the age of 91.

== Bibliography ==
- Allen, Jimmy Raymond (1995). Burden of a Secret: A Story of Truth And Mercy in the Face of AIDS. Moorings. ISBN 9780345407894.
