= J. D. Grey =

American pastor (1906–1985)

James David "J. D." Grey

28th President of the Southern Baptist Convention
- In office 1952–1954
- Preceded by: Robert G. Lee
- Succeeded by: J. W. Storer

Personal details
- Born: December 18, 1906 Princeton, Kentucky, U.S.
- Died: July 26, 1985 (aged 78) New Orleans, Louisiana, U.S.
- Resting place: Metairie, Louisiana
- Party: Democratic
- Spouse: Lillian Tooke Grey (married 1927-1985, his death)
- Children: Martha Ann Cantrell; Mary Beth Burg
- Education: Union University; Southwestern Baptist Theological Seminary
- Occupation: Southern Baptist clergyman: Pastor, First Baptist Church of New Orleans, Louisiana

J. D. Grey, sometimes known by his adopted name as James David Grey (December 18, 1906 – July 26, 1985), was a major figure in the Southern Baptist Convention and from 1937 to 1972 was the pastor of the large First Baptist Church of New Orleans, Louisiana.

== Background ==
A native of Princeton in Caldwell County in western Kentucky, Grey was reared in Paducah, a city in McCracken County, also in western Kentucky at the confluence of the Tennessee and Ohio rivers. In 1925, Grey received his diploma from Paducah Tilghman High School. That same year, he was ordained to preach by the Immanuel Baptist Church, which began only three years earlier in 1922 as a mission of First Baptist Paducah. Immanuel is now located on Buckner Lane in Paducah.

In 1959, years after he had left Paducah, the mayor named Grey an honorary "Duke of Paducah". In 1929, he graduated from Baptist-affiliated Union University in Jackson, Tennessee. In 1932, he received the Master of Theology degree from Southwestern Baptist Theological Seminary in Fort Worth, Texas.

While he attended Southwestern Seminary, Grey was the pastor from 1929 to 1931 of the Vickery Baptist Church in Dallas. From 1931 to 1934, he was the pastor of Tabernacle Baptist Church in Ennis in Ellis County, south of Dallas. Both of those congregations remain active.

== Ministry ==
In 1934, Grey accepted the pastorate of the First Baptist Church of Denton, Texas, but left, effective May 31, 1937, for his final pastorate at the First Baptist New Orleans, which extended for thirty-five years until his retirement on December 31, 1972. During that time, the congregation nearly tripled and annual contributions increased from $26,000 to more than $650,000. As a preacher, Grey accented the basic Christian tenets:

"God, man, sin, grace, eternity," in that order. His biographer compare his style to that of the 19th century minister Henry Ward Beecher, the brother of Harriet Beecher Stowe: "sometimes thundering, sometimes pleading, with a strong personality that dominated any platform he ever mounted, and a magnetic appeal that focused all eyes on him when he spoke. ... as a man of mature logic, Grey has developed his sermons through the years from a soberly reasoned and carefully thought-out position. ... He always bridges the gap between the secular mind and the biblical world."

From 1949 to 1950, Grey was the president of the Louisiana Baptist Convention, the headquarters of which are based in Alexandria. He was a trustee of Baptist-affiliated Louisiana College in Pineville, which in 1952 awarded him an honorary doctorate. In 1951, Grey became the first pastor ever to lead a prayer at the Sugar Bowl pregame in New Orleans, which that year matched Bear Bryant's Kentucky Wildcats and Bud Wilkinson's Oklahoma Sooners. When Kentucky won, his fellow clergyman and close friend Herschel H. Hobbs, an Oklahoma native, jokingly suggested that the Wildcats prevailed because Grey was a Kentucky native and had led the prayer. "They ought to have had somebody from Oklahoma pray," said Hobbs. Grey told Hobbs that the Lord should not be bothered with the outcome of the game since Kentucky "had Babe Parilli on its team".

In 1952 and 1953, Grey was elected by the delegates as the president of the Southern Baptist Convention, based in Nashville. At forty-four, he was the youngest man ever elected to the SBC presidency. He was nominated by John Jeter Hurt, then the present of Grey's alma mater, Union University. Hurt had been Grey's pastor in Jackson, Tennessee; he nominated more SBC candidates who became president than any other individual. Grey said that he had never run for a church office and "if the brethren elect me, it's because I have always tried to do every job Baptists assigned me to do to the best of my ability, whether it's to be the obituary chairman of my association, or missions chairman, or whatever. I have tried to serve my denomination."

From 1950 to 1970, Grey was a member of the Baptist World Alliance. In 1954, he chaired Billy Graham's four-week Evangelistic Crusade at Pelican Stadium in New Orleans. In 1957, he was the president of the Greater New Orleans Federation of Churches. He was called a "conservative ecumeniac", who believed the literal words of the hymn "Blest Be the Tie That Binds" which calls for the "fellowship of kindred minds" guided by the Holy Spirit.

== Relations with politicians ==
In 1957, Grey was asked to nominate for the Southern Baptist Convention presidency Brooks Hays, a liberal U.S. representative from Little Rock, Arkansas, who subsequently lost a Democratic gubernatorial primary election in 1966. At the time Hays was the chairman of the Christian Life Commission, a liberal group advocating peaceful relations with African Americans. Grey declined to make the nomination on the grounds that he should not use his influence as a two-term past president of the convention to promote a particular candidate. Nevertheless, Hays was elected as the convention president for a single term that year.

Among the politicians who admired Grey was the colorful and controversial Governor Earl Kemp Long, who retorted, "Everybody's bragging about this Billy Graham. Hell! He can't preach nothing [sic] like J. D. Grey. I had rather hear him preach than any [other] man I've ever heard."

In 1964, Grey became involved in the Louisiana gubernatorial election on behalf of an erstwhile rival of Long's, the former Mayor DeLesseps Story Morrison, who had resigned as United States Ambassador to the Organization of American States under U.S. President John F. Kennedy, to make his third unsuccessful bid for the state's highest office. At the time, Morrison, a Roman Catholic, faced a Democratic runoff election with John McKeithen, a Methodist from Columbia and a member of the Louisiana Public Service Commission. In a newspaper advertisement, Grey wrote:

You made us a marvelous mayor. I moved to New Orleans in 1937 and know what the city was before you took office [in 1946]. You gave New Orleans its start toward the great, progressive, industrial world city we have today. I saw you restore City Hall to a place of dignity, integrity, and respect. You gave your active support to every worthy move to improve the civic, business, social, cultural, and spiritual life of an entire community.

Grey's biographers note that "on occasion, J. D. raked his friend [Morrison] over the coals in matter political and controversial. His influence was effective on many issues. By the same token, the mayor could respond to J. D. as a friend when he offered ... the keys to the city to a young Billy Graham in his first crusade ..." in New Orleans. When school desegregation came to New Orleans in 1959, Grey served as a member and director of the group, Citizens for Support of Public Schools.

In 1968 and 1969, Grey was the president and board member of the New Orleans Metropolitan Crime Commission under Morrison's successor, Democratic Mayor Victor Schiro.

The New Orleans Times-Picayune analyzed Grey, accordingly:

Dr. Grey has provided spiritual leadership and inspiration to New Orleans' largest Protestant congregation. And together, Dr. Grey and his church have played significant roles in every project of civic betterment through the years. ... All of his splendid attributes of intellect, integrity, courage, and compassion he has devote unstithingly to his church and his community. His influence has been widespread. ...

== Community activities ==
Grey was a founding member in 1942 and thereafter the president in 1956 of the Louisiana Moral and Civic Foundation. He was a member of the committee which in 1968 coordinated the 250th anniversary celebration of the founding of New Orleans. He was a board member of the "good government" group known as the Council for a Better Louisiana and the children's advocacy group, Big Brothers of New Orleans. He was also a life member of the advisory board of the Salvation Army in New Orleans, vice-chairman of the Louisiana State Board of Corrections, and a board member of the Association for Retarded Children, the American Red Cross, United Givers Fund, and the Boy Scouts of America. He was active for three decades in Kiwanis International, which gave him a "Legion of Honor" certificate. In 1984, long after he had retired as a pastor, Grey was an advisor for the 1984 Louisiana World Exposition held at the site of the defunct Rivergate Convention Center. This was the last world's fair to have been held in the United States.

For his community service, Grey in 1971 received the "Loving Cup" from the New Orleans Times-Picayune. In 1969, the unconventional biography entitled St. J. D. was written by Robert L. Lee, then the executive-secretary of the Louisiana Baptist Convention, and James F. Cole, the editor at that time of the state newspaper, The Baptist Message. Grey was listed in Who's Who in America, Who's Who in the South and Southwest, Who's Who in Religion and Outstanding Civic Leaders of America. In 1972, Grey penned Epitaphs for Eager Preachers. In 1956, Grey was named an "honorary citizen" of Oklahoma by then Governor Raymond Gary. In 1965, he was so honored in Dallas, Texas, and thereafter in twelve other cities. He was made an honorary deputy sheriff in ten counties in four states.

In 1958, Grey played himself in the noir film Damn Citizen.

== Family, death, legacy ==
Grey and his wife, the former Lillian Tooke, whom he married in 1927, had twin daughters born in 1941, Martha Ann Cantrell and her husband, Richard C. Cantrell (born 1940) of Gretna in Jefferson Parish, and Mary Beth Burg and husband, Jules L. Burg Jr. (1923-2011). There are three Grey grandchildren, Bryant Curtis Cantrell, Patrick Grey Cantrell, and Joe David Burg.

Grey died in 1985 at the age of seventy-eight of a lengthy illness at Baptist Hospital in New Orleans. He is interred in Metairie in Jefferson Parish, Louisiana.

The New Orleans Baptist Theological Seminary honors Grey with its J. D. Grey Chair of Preaching and its annual J. D. Grey Preaching Award. In 2011, the recipient of both designations was Dennis Phelps, the NOBTS professor of preaching and director of church relations and alumni. A former Grey scholar is Argile Smith, the incoming interim president of Louisiana College.

G. Earl Guinn, the president of Louisiana College from 1951 to 1975, said of his friend: "I feel toward J. D. Grey about like Winston Churchill felt toward his friend, the first Earl of Birkenhead. ... I would rather have J. D. Grey at my side, cataracts, arthritis, and all, than 99 percent of the people in all of the world."

W. A. Criswell, pastor of the First Baptist Church of Dallas, Texas, and founder of Criswell College, said of Grey: "No man among us has won more distinction from Southern Baptists than J. D. Grey. He has influenced so many groups, has been a friend to all of us."

Grey's papers are housed at the Southern Baptist Historical Library and Archives in Nashville, Tennessee.

== See also ==
- List of Southern Baptist Convention affiliated people
- Southern Baptist Convention
- Southern Baptist Convention Presidents

Preceded by Robert G. Lee of Tennessee	President of the Southern Baptist Convention; 1952–1954	Succeeded by J. W. Storer of Oklahoma
