= The Church at Ponce & Highland =

Church in Atlanta, Georgia

Coordinates: 33.7734°N 84.3520°W

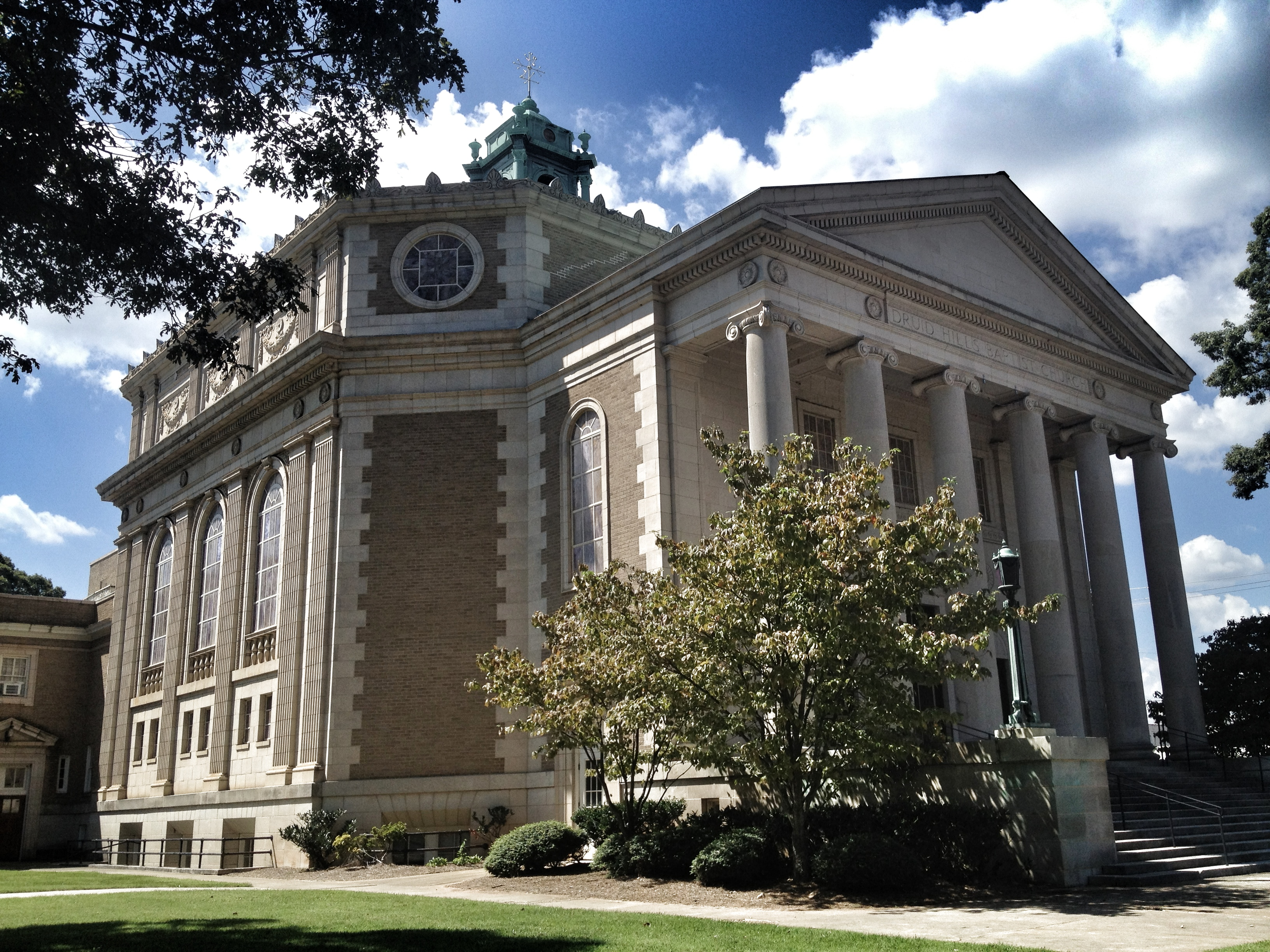
The Church at Ponce & Highland

The Church at Ponce & Highland is a Baptist church, founded in July 1914 and located at 1085 Ponce de Leon Ave NE at the corner of Highland Avenue in the Poncey–Highland neighborhood in the city of Atlanta. Designed by architect Edward Emmett Dougherty (b. 1876), the Beaux-Arts Style building is remarkable for its massive columns and the orb-shaped designs woodwork surrounding the baptistery.

The first meeting of the church in 1914 was at the corner of Highland and Greenwood Avenues in Highland Park subdivision of what is now Virginia–Highland. While there, they used the facilities of the now defunct Highland Park Baptist Church. In 1918 the congregation acquired the land for the present day church at the corner of Highland and Ponce. The building was inaugurated in 1928 and in July 2014 the church celebrated its centennial year in that very building.

The Church at Ponce & Highland was known as Druid Hills Baptist Church from its inception until 2015.

== Pastors ==
- Dr. Fernando Coello McConnell, 1914-1929
- Louie De Votie Newton, 1929-1968
- Dr. Harold Deaton Zwald, 1969-1976
- Dr. William Robert Defoor, 1976-1979
- Dr. Paul Mims, 1979-1990
- Dr. John David Baker, 1991-1998
- Rev. Jonathan Bud Spencer, 1998-2007
- Dr. Graham B. Walker, Co-Pastor; 2008-2010
- Rev. Mimi Walker, Co-Pastor; 2008-2010
- Rev. Mimi Walker, 2010–Present

== Membership ==
Druid Hills Baptist Church was chartered in 1914 with 173 members. By January 1, 1915, membership had increased to 250 people and by 1929, when their first pastor Rev. Dr. McConnell died in 1929 membership had increased to 1,650. Previously, the church had set a record in 1925 when over 500 people attended Sunday school and just a mere 10 years later, Sunday school attendance had more than tripled to 1,700.

In July 1928, when the present sanctuary on Ponce De Leon Ave opened for the first time, 1700 people filled the sanctuary with overflow moving into the basement where speakers were set up for them to hear the service. On April 7, 1929, there was an attendance of 1,557 in worship to support the installment of the new pastor, Louie De Votie Newton. October of that same year Sunday school rolls show there were 2,567 currently attending Sunday school regularly while church attendance hovered around 1,900.

In the 1940s the church had an active 3,062 members but attendance averaged around 1,561 in Sunday School. Between 1929 and 1949 Dr. Newton doubled church membership from 1,691 to 3,637. In 1947 the all-time high membership reached 3,637 and by 1952 that number had dropped to 3,446 members. In 1953 there was another dip in membership and numbers hovered around 3,423. The membership plateau of the church because in the 1960s and in the 1970s a slow but steady decline in membership continued until membership was down to 1,850 in 1987. The number again plateaued for a few years and then began to decline again throughout the 1990s and early 2000s. Membership today now sits at around 100 in worship every Sunday.
