= The Summit Church =

- Location: Durham, North Carolina
- Country: United States
- Denomination: Baptist
- Website: summitchurch.com

History
- Founded: 1961

The Summit Church is a Baptist Evangelical multi-site megachurch church headquartered in Durham, North Carolina and meets at 12 campuses across the Triangle area. It is affiliated with the Southern Baptist Convention. Regular attendance averages nearly 11,564 people weekly.

== History ==
The Summit Church began in 1961 when Sam James preached the first service at what was then the Grace Baptist Mission in Durham. Within a year, the mission grew into the new Homestead Heights Baptist Church.

The church grew to a membership of over 150 by 1965 and as its numbers increased the congregation built a new church building in the 1980s able to seat 600 people. Although it briefly exceeded capacity, there was little growth in the 1990s and attendance eventually declined to a steady 400 members. In 2002, Homestead Heights called its college pastor of a year and a half, J.D. Greear, to be pastor. After accepting the position, Greear asked for the renaming and ultimately the re-launching of the church as the Summit Church. In the first three years, a large influx of members eventually led to the sale of its property which was located on Holt School Road; in April 2005 the church began holding services at Riverside High School.

A census of the denomination published in 2020 said that the church has a weekly attendance of 11,564 people and 12 campuses in different cities.
