= Dale Alford =

American politician (1916–2000)

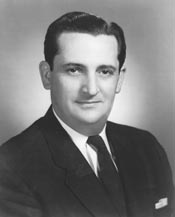
- Dale Alford

U.S. Representative from Arkansas's 5th congressional district
- In office January 3, 1959 – January 3, 1963
- Preceded by: Brooks Hays
- Succeeded by: District eliminated

Little Rock School Board
- In office 1955–1958

Personal details
- Born: Thomas Dale Alford; January 28, 1916 Newhope, Arkansas, U.S.
- Died: January 25, 2000 (aged 83) Little Rock, Arkansas, U.S.
- Resting place: Mount Holly Cemetery in Little Rock
- Party: Democratic
- Spouse: L'Moore Smith Alford (married 1940; deceased)
- Children: 3
- Education: Arkansas State University University of Central Arkansas University of Arkansas for Medical Sciences
- Occupation: Ophthalmologist

Military service
- Allegiance: United States
- Branch/service: United States Army: United States Army Medical Corps
- Rank: Captain
- Battles/wars: European Theater of Operations of World War II

Thomas Dale Alford Sr. (January 28, 1916 – January 25, 2000) was an American ophthalmologist and politician from the U.S. state of Arkansas who served as a conservative Democrat in the United States House of Representatives from Little Rock from 1959 to 1963.

== Early years and education ==
Alford was born to Thomas H. Alford and the former Ida Womack in the small community of Newhope near Murfreesboro in Pike County in southwestern Arkansas. He attended public schools at Rector in Clay County in far northeastern Arkansas. He graduated from high school in 1932, a year ahead of schedule.

Alford first attended Arkansas State College in Jonesboro in eastern Arkansas, followed by the Arkansas State Teachers College in Conway, and received his medical degree in 1939 from the University of Arkansas for Medical Sciences at Little Rock.

== Military service and medical practice ==
Alford served as a captain during World War II in the United States Army Medical Corps from 1940 to 1946. He was on active duty as a surgeon in the European Theater of operations. Afterwards, from 1947 to 1948, he was an assistant professor at Methodist-affiliated Emory University School of Medicine in Atlanta, Georgia.

== Elections to Congress, 1958 and 1960 ==
Alford was elected as a write-in candidate in the 1958 general election that occurred in the aftermath of the Little Rock Crisis. He was only the third write-in candidate ever to have been elected to the House. (The Republican Joe Skeen was thereafter elected to the House from New Mexico as a write-in candidate in 1980.) Alford jumped into the election against incumbent U.S. Representative Brooks Hays who had endorsed the integration of Little Rock Central High School. Alford supporters printed thousands of stickers with his name on them and handed them out at polling places. Hays maintained a lead during the counting until an extra twenty boxes arrived bearing ballots with Alford stickers. Ultimately, Alford prevailed, 30,739 (51 percent) to Hays' 29,483 (49 percent).

Osro Cobb, the United States Attorney for the Eastern District of Arkansas, recalled that:

There were loud protests and allegations of irregularities and fraud from Hays supporters. Because it was a federal election, I had a grand jury impaneled, and an order was obtained from the U.S. District Court that impounded all of the ballots cast for review by the grand jury. When the grand jury completed its minute review of all the votes cast, it was established that the count had been unusually accurate for each candidate [Alford and Hays], and the grand jury was so outraged by the allegations made and the lack of evidence to support them that it seriously considered indicting those who had made the accusations. I was surprised by Hays' defeat because I did not realize the extent and commitment of the majority of the voters in the Fifth Congressional District to separate-but-equal schools in lieu of integration, which they feared would destroy their schools.

In 1960, Alford won his second term in the House with 57,617 votes (82.7 percent) to Republican L. J. Churchill (1902–1987) of Dover in Pope County in northwestern Arkansas, who received 12,054 ballots (17.3 percent). Churchill was a highly regarded civic and political figure in Dover. A Cumberland Presbyterian and a Mason, Churchill served as mayor of Dover and on the municipal school board, both nonpartisan positions. He had been state chairman of the Agricultural Stabilization and Conservation Service of the United States Department of Agriculture. He operated L.J. Churchill's General Merchandise Store and was a member of the board of directors of the Bank of Dover.

== Two gubernatorial races ==
Alford's Little Rock-based district was merged with Arkansas's 2nd congressional district, represented by the chairman of the House Ways and Means Committee, Wilbur D. Mills, after the 1960 census revealed that Arkansas had grown at less than the national average during the 1950s. Rather than face certain defeat in the 1962 Democratic primary against Mills, at the time an icon in Arkansas politics, Alford instead chose to enter the primary against incumbent Governor Orval Faubus. In an active campaign, Faubus polled a narrow majority over Alford, former Governor Sidney Sanders McMath, Vernon H. Whitten, and two other candidates. Faubus received 208,996 ballots (51.6 percent) to McMath's 83,437 (20.6 percent), Alford's 82,815 (20.4 percent), and Whitten's 22,377 (5.5 percent). Faubus then prevailed with ease over the Republican nominee, Fayetteville pharmacist Willis Ricketts.

Alford ran for governor again in 1966 and finished fourth in the primary with 53,531 votes (12.7 percent). He received fewer votes than his old nemesis Brooks Hays, who with 64,814 (15.4 percent) finished third in the primary balloting. The runoff positions went to former Arkansas Supreme Court justices James D. Johnson, a segregationist, and Frank Holt. Johnson narrowly defeated Holt in the Democratic runoff but then lost to Republican Winthrop Rockefeller in the general election. In 1984, Alford entered the Democratic primary election for Congress in Central Arkansas's Second District for the open seat being vacated by Republican Ed Bethune. Appearing to many voters as a throwback to another era, Alford ran a distant fifth in a race ultimately won by Pulaski County Sheriff Tommy Robinson. Alford was far outpolled by African-American Thedford Collins, a Little Rock banker and former aide to U.S. Senator David Pryor.

== Alford's death ==
Alford died in Little Rock of congestive heart failure on January 25, 2000, three days shy of his eighty-third birthday.

== See also ==
U.S. House of Representatives
Preceded by Brooks Hays	Member of the U.S. House of Representatives from Arkansas's 5th congressional district 1959–1963	District eliminated
