= Willy Rice =

American pastor

- Church: Calvary Church (Clearwater, Florida)
- Installed: 2004

Orders
- Ordination: Pastor, President of the Southern Baptist Convention (2026–present)

Personal details
- Denomination: Baptist (Southern Baptist Convention)
- Spouse: Cheryl Rice
- Children: 3
- Education: Samford University (BA); New Orleans Baptist Theological Seminary (M.Div., D.Min.)

William "Willy" Rice is an American evangelical pastor who has been the president of the Southern Baptist Convention since being elected in June 2026. He has also served as the senior pastor of Calvary Church in Clearwater, Florida, since 2004.

== Early life and education ==
Rice earned a bachelor of arts degree from Samford University in 1985, a master of divinity degree from New Orleans Baptist Theological Seminary in 1990, and a doctor of ministry degree also from New Orleans Baptist Theological Seminary in 1996.

== Career ==
Before settling in Clearwater, Florida, Rice pastored Bethel Baptist Church in Dora, Alabama, from 1984 to 1987; Cypress Lake Baptist Church in Tampa, Florida, from 1987 to 1992; Gladeview Baptist Church in Anniston, Alabama, from 1992 to 1997; and Hillcrest Baptist Church in Pensacola, Florida, from 1997 to 2004. Rice was then chosen as the senior pastor of Calvary Baptist Church in Clearwater, Florida, in 2004, a role in which he still serves.

Rice served as the president of the Florida Baptist Convention from 2006 to 2008 as well as the president of SBC pastors' conferences and chairman of various SBC committees. At the annual meeting of the Southern Baptist Convention in June 2025, Rice offered a motion seeking to abolish the Ethics & Religious Liberty Commission, but the motion failed.

At the annual meeting of the Southern Baptist Convention in June 2026 in Orlando, Florida, Rice was elected as the President of the Southern Baptist Convention to a one-year term.

== Personal life ==
Rice is married to Cheryl Rice, and they have three children.

Preceded by Clint Pressley	President of the Southern Baptist Convention; 2026–present	Succeeded by Incumbent
