= Lawrence Owen Cooper Sr. =

American businessman and humanitarian (1908–1986)

- Born: April 19, 1908; Warren County, Mississippi, U.S.
- Died: November 8, 1986 (aged 78)
- Other names: Owen Cooper
- Occupations: Businessman and Southern Baptist layman
- Years active: 1945 to 1980
- Spouse(s): Elizabeth Cooper, née Thompson (m. 1938)
- Children: 5

Lawrence Owen Cooper Sr. (April 19, 1908 – November 8, 1986) was an American businessman and humanitarian in Mississippi. He was known for his ability to challenge Mississippians to work together in solving economic and social problems following the Great Depression. During a career that spanned four decades, Cooper served on the Mississippi Planning Commission, at the Mississippi Farm Bureau Federation, and in executive positions at Mississippi Chemical Corporation. He was a member of the executive committee at the Southern Baptist Convention (SBC) for 21 years and was elected president of the SBC from 1972 to 1974.

== Early years ==
Cooper was born in Warren County, Mississippi on April 19, 1908 to William Samuel Cooper and Malena Head Cooper. Cooper and his two brothers gained a strong work ethic by "chopping cotton and milking cows" on his father's 800-acre cotton and dairy farm north of Vicksburg, Mississippi.

== Education and career ==
Cooper received his secondary education at Culkin Academy, a high school in rural Warren County. In 1924, he entered Mississippi A&M College where he majored in agriculture and improved his public speaking skills. While in college, Cooper participated in Baptist Student Union activities and became president of the Mississippi Baptist Student Union.

After Cooper graduated from Mississippi A&M in 1930, he began teaching vocational arts and coaching a girls' basketball team at the local high school in Leland, Mississippi. He was also deeply involved in activities of the local First Baptist Church.

After five years of teaching, Cooper decided to pursue a new career path to better utilize his skills to solve problems for the people of Mississippi. In 1935, he entered a master's degree program in political science and economics at the University of Mississippi and graduated in 1936. That same year, Cooper began working for the Mississippi Planning Commission in Jackson. The State Planning Commission was created in 1936 to coordinate with the federal Works Progress Administration as a part of New Deal programs to create job opportunities in construction of roads, bridges, parks, schools, and drainage basins.

While working full time, Cooper was actively involved in Jackson's First Baptist Church and volunteered as director of the Baptist Student Unions for Millsaps College and Belhaven College. By taking night classes, Cooper earned a law degree from Jackson School of Law in 1938.

When Cooper was replaced by a political appointee at the State Planning Commission in 1940, he became director of research and organization at Mississippi Farm Bureau as an advocate for policies that would benefit Mississippi farmers. In his new career position, Cooper initiated several Farm Bureau insurance programs within the state to provide affordable health insurance, life insurance, and property insurance to farm families.

Cooper was given a deferment from military service during World War II because his work at the Farm Bureau was considered vital to wartime agricultural production. As editor of Mississippi Farm Bureau (MFB) news bulletins, he encouraged farmers to increase production of cotton that was needed for military supplies, promoted the sale of war bonds, and became executive director of MFB in 1945.

In 1948, Cooper left his position with the Mississippi Farm Bureau to initiate an agricultural cooperative for producing fertilizers that would increase crop productivity on Mississippi farms. Cooper moved to Yazoo City and helped establish Mississippi Chemical Corporation (MCC), described as "…the world's first farmer-owned nitrogen fertilizer manufacturing operation". Cooper and a group of prominent Mississippi farm leaders were able to secure funding from private investors and the Reconstruction Finance Corporation to build the chemical plant in Yazoo City. Fertilizer production began in 1951. During the next 25 years, with Cooper as chief executive officer, Mississippi Chemical Corporation became the largest producer of fertilizer in the South with production facilities in Pascagoula, Mississippi; Donaldsonville, Louisiana; Carlsbad, New Mexico; and Trinidad. Cooper retired from MCC in 1973.

When a farmer's delegation from India visited Mississippi's fertilizer manufacturing facility in the late 1960s, they requested assistance from Cooper to help them build a similar facility in their country. As a humanitarian gesture, Cooper accepted their challenge and successfully secured funding for the project through American farm fertilizer cooperatives and the U.S. Agency for International Development. Cooper made several advisory trips to India which led to the establishment of the Indian Farmers Fertilizer Cooperative and the construction of a multimillion-dollar fertilizer complex at Kandla.

== Southern Baptist affiliation and race relations ==
Throughout his life, Cooper retained a strong affiliation with the Southern Baptist organization. In First Baptist churches, he accepted leadership positions as deacon and Sunday school teacher. By 1954, he was president of the Mississippi Baptist Convention and was on the board of trustees of the New Orleans Baptist Theological Seminary.

Although Owen Cooper spent most of his adult life in a segregated Mississippi, his views on civil rights and social justice evolved. He strongly supported the 1964 Civil Rights Act and requested that Mississippi Chemical Corporation's board of directors approve a resolution to support the goals set forth in that legislation.

In the mid-1960s, Cooper helped organize the Mississippi Religious Leadership Council as a voice for denouncing the burning of black churches in the state following passage of the Civil Rights Act. In 1965, at a hearing of the US Commission on Civil Rights in Jackson, Mississippi, Cooper noted that the citizens of the state had to recognize " …that the Civil Rights Act of 1964 is the law of the land … and the habits of yesteryear had to be cast aside".

Cooper was appointed by Sargent Shriver (director of the national Office of Economic Opportunity) to be chairman of the Mississippi Action for Progress (MAP). MAP was initiated in 1966 to provide preschool children from low-income families with local child development services. Cooper retired as MAP chairman in 1975.

Cooper served for 21 years as a member of the Southern Baptist Convention Executive Committee. Between 1972 and 1974, he held the office of president of the Southern Baptist Convention.

== Public service ==
=== State ===
- Mississippi Commission on Hospital Care – As chairman of the commission, established in 1946, Cooper convinced the Mississippi Legislature to match federal Hospital Survey and Construction Act funding to construct more than 100 rural hospitals throughout Mississippi.
- First Mississippi Corporation (FMC) – Until his death in 1986, Cooper served on the board of directors for FMC which was chartered in 1957 by the state to diversify operations of Mississippi Chemical Corporation into non-related industries. In 1975, FMC became Mississippi's first state chartered company to have its shares traded on the New York Stock Exchange.
- President of Mississippi State University Alumni Association
- Board of trustees member at Mississippi Baptist Hospital (1946-1952)
- President of the Mississippi Economic Council in 1966

=== National ===
- National campaign vice-chairman for the Red Cross in 1957
- Member of Jimmy Carter's President's Personnel Advisory Committee
- Member of the Federal Farm Credit Board
- Member of the committee for Arms Control and Disarmament in 1978

== Personal life, legacy and death ==
In 1938, Owen Cooper married Elizabeth Thompson, who he met at a Baptist Student Union convention in Jackson, Mississippi. At that time, Ms. Thompson was serving as director of Louisiana Polytechnic Institute's Baptist Student Union in Ruston, Louisiana. They became the parents of five children.

During his 40-year career, Cooper secured billions of dollars of investments to benefit the citizens of Mississippi.

Cooper was inducted into the Mississippi Hall of Fame to honor his significant contributions to the state. His portrait is on display in Mississippi's Old Capitol Museum in Jackson.

Owen Cooper died on November 8, 1986.
