= Clint Pressley =

American pastor (born 1969)

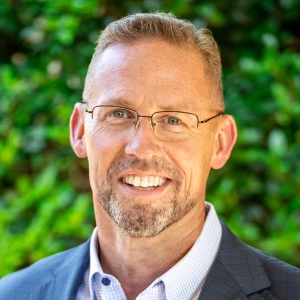
- Church: Hickory Grove Baptist Church
- Installed: 2010

Orders
- Ordination: Pastor, former president of the Southern Baptist Convention (2024–2026)

Personal details
- Born: February 26, 1969 (age 57) Charlotte, North Carolina
- Denomination: Baptist (Southern Baptist Convention)
- Spouse: Connie Pressley
- Education: Wofford College (BA); New Orleans Baptist Theological Seminary (M.Div.)

Clint Pressley (born February 26, 1969) is an American evangelical pastor who served as the president of the Southern Baptist Convention from June 2024 to June 2026. He serves as the senior pastor of Hickory Grove Baptist Church in Charlotte, North Carolina, a position he has held since 2011.

== Early life and education ==
Pressley was born in Charlotte, North Carolina, in 1969. He attended a church within the Presbyterian Church (USA) with his parents when he was young. He attended Hickory Grove Baptist Church in Charlotte as a teenager. He graduated from Wofford College with a Bachelor of Arts degree and later received a Master of Divinity from New Orleans Baptist Theological Seminary after having first attended Southwestern Baptist Theological Seminary.

== Career ==
Pressley pastored two churches in Mississippi before returning to Hickory Grove Baptist Church in 1999 as senior associate pastor of preaching. In 2004, he became senior pastor of the Dauphin Way Baptist Church in Mobile, Alabama. In 2010, Pressley came back to Hickory Grove Baptist Church as co-pastor and was installed as senior pastor in 2011.

Pressley served as the first vice president of the Southern Baptist Convention from 2014 to 2015. He has also served on the board of trustees of the Southern Baptist Theological Seminary since 2015, serving as chairman of the board from 2020 to 2022.

At the annual meeting of the Southern Baptist Convention in June 2024 in Indianapolis, Indiana, Pressley was elected as the President of the Southern Baptist Convention to a one-year term. At the June 2025 annual meeting in Dallas, Texas, Pressley was reelected to another one-year term.

== Personal life ==
Pressley is married to Connie LaBelle Smith Pressley, and they have two adopted sons, one of whom died at age 24 in 2023.

Preceded by Bart Barber	President of the Southern Baptist Convention; 2024–2026	Succeeded by Willy Rice
