= Gardendale First Baptist Church =

- Gardendale First Baptist Church
- 33.649393°N 86.812574°W
- Address: Gardendale, Alabama
- Country: United States
- Denomination: Southern Baptist Convention
- Website: www.gfbc.com

Gardendale First Baptist Church (sometimes styled as "Gardendale's" or GFBC) is a Baptist megachurch in Gardendale, Alabama. It is affiliated with the Southern Baptist Convention. The senior pastor is Dr. Kevin Hamm.

== History ==
The church was founded in 1876. From 1992 to 2006, Steve Gaines served as senior pastor. In 2006, Kevin Hamm became senior pastor. The church claimed weekly attendance of about 3,500 worshipers in 2016.
