= Adrian Rogers =

American pastor and author (1931–2005)

The Reverend Adrian Rogers
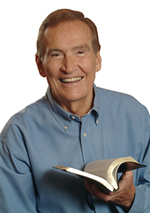
- Adrian Rogers
- Born: Adrian Pierce Rogers; September 12, 1931; West Palm Beach, Florida, U.S.
- Died: November 15, 2005 (aged 74); Memphis, Tennessee, U.S.
- Education: Stetson University (BA); New Orleans Baptist Theological Seminary (BDiv)
- Occupations: Pastor, Author, President of the Southern Baptist Convention
- Spouse: Joyce Rogers
- Website: www.lwf.org

Adrian Pierce Rogers (September 12, 1931 – November 15, 2005) was an American Baptist pastor and author. He served three terms as president of the Southern Baptist Convention (1979–1980 and 1986–1988).

== Early life and education ==
Rogers was born in West Palm Beach, Florida. He entered Christian ministry at the age of nineteen. He studied at Stetson University in DeLand, Florida, and earned a Bachelor of Arts in 1954, then he studied at New Orleans Baptist Theological Seminary and earned a Bachelor of Divinity in 1958. Rogers was ordained by Northwood Baptist Church (later known as The Village Baptist Church, now operating as Family Church Village) in West Palm Beach.

== Ministry ==
His first job as a senior pastor was at Fellsmere Baptist Church, a small congregation in Fellsmere, Florida. He performed his first baptism in the C-54 Canal near Fellsmere. In a radio sermon entitled "The Final Judgment", Rogers alluded to a radio program he hosted in the 1950s called "Day Break". He was senior pastor of First Baptist Church in Merritt Island, Florida from 1964 to 1972. In 1972, he became the senior pastor of Bellevue Baptist Church in Memphis, Tennessee, where he remained until March 2005. During this period, the church's membership grew from 9,000 to 29,000, and the church moved into a new, megachurch facility. Rogers was named pastor emeritus after his retirement in March 2005.

=== Southern Baptist Convention presidency ===
He was elected president of the Southern Baptist Convention in 1979 in Houston, Texas, on a platform of biblical inerrancy. This election launched the conservative resurgence in the denomination, a movement pushed by the theologian Paige Patterson and the Houston judge Paul Pressler. When conservative control of all SBC seminaries and agencies was finally complete, liberal and moderate seminary professors were dismissed, or replaced by theological conservatives in response to normal attrition. All employees of SBC seminaries and denominatIonal agencies were required to affirm their adherence to the Baptist Faith and Message. The denomination has remained conservative since Rogers' tenure as president. He was re-elected in 1986 and 1987.

He was the chairman of the committee which produced the revised 2000 edition of the Baptist Faith and Message.

He published eighteen books and his works are featured on the internationally available radio and television program, Love Worth Finding, which is broadcast in English and Spanish. Rogers was also the founder of the Adrian Rogers Pastor Training Institute for ministers.

== On politics and social issues ==
Like many influential conservative pastors, Rogers participated in the advancement of a conservative political agenda in the United States. He stated that Christians have a duty to be involved in government.

Familial dynamics was a recurrent issue for Rogers. He focused most closely on fathers that he labeled "drop-out dads." According to Rogers, since the Bible emphasizes the paternal role in a family, the father should be the primary source of teaching in the home. He was critical of fathers who do not fulfill this role: "We have dads today that are interested in sports, business, and sex. They've forgotten their God-given assignments to teach the Ten Commandments". He went on to say that social problems, such as gun violence, are the consequences of fathers avoiding this responsibility.

On the topic of pastoral endorsement of political candidates, he wrote that it is a pastor's duty to influence the political decisions of the members of the pastor's congregation. A pastor need not, however, endorse a specific candidate (and, under Internal Revenue Service regulations, a church could lose its tax-exempt status for doing so). He wrote that "[i]f [a pastor] has done his job his members will prayerfully and correctly use the standard of God's Word to select the right candidate."

In May 2003, Rogers, along with twenty-four other religious leaders and persons of influence, signed a letter sent from Gary Bauer's conservative organization American Values to President George W. Bush. The letter criticizes President Bush's proposed Road Map for Peace initiative as being too lax towards the Palestinians. The letter states in part, "Mr. President, it would be morally reprehensible for the United States to be 'evenhanded' between democratic Israel… and the terrorist infested Palestinian infrastructure."

Cecil Sherman (the Coordinator of the Cooperative Baptist Fellowship, a group of moderate Baptists who separated from the Southern Baptist Convention) writes in his autobiography that he once questioned Rogers about biblical inerrancy with reference to New Testament passages that seem to support slavery. Sherman reports that Rogers replied: "I believe slavery is a much maligned institution; if we had slavery today, we would not have this welfare mess." Later on, Rogers signed a revised Baptist Faith and Message declaration stating that all races are equal before the Lord.

Rogers was an adamant supporter of the pro-life movement, had stated that the institution of capital punishment is spiritually ordained, and (along with other Southern Baptists) supported a boycott of Disney because of the company's promotion of homosexuality.

As a traditional Baptist, he opposed the use of alcohol and tobacco, frequently telling stories to warn of their dangers. One particular story tells of a father who learned that his daughter had died while driving drunk, vowed revenge towards whoever had sold her the alcohol, only to discover that she had taken the bottle from his own liquor cabinet.

Rogers also preached against gambling. In one such message, he revealed he once witnessed to boxing champion Muhammad Ali in Paradise Island, Bahamas.

The quote "You cannot multiply wealth by dividing it." was often attributed to Rogers with an incorrect date of 1931. In fact, the quotation is part of a longer sermon by Rogers from 1984 in a larger series titled God’s Way to Health, Wealth and Wisdom (CDA107), but it also appears as a passage in Rogers' 1996 work Ten Secrets for a Successful Family stating that "by and large our young people do not know either the importance or the value of honest labor".

Rogers did not originate the quote at all. In fact, he did not claim to have originated it. Instead, he was citing almost verbatim anti-Soviet propaganda that had circulated in many magazines in the early 1960s. The quote appeared before that in the Congressional Record of 1958, where it was appended to the record by U.S. Senator George Aiken of Vermont. Aiken had taken the words from Senator James Eastland of Mississippi, who had said them in his address at the Illinois Agricultural Association's annual meeting on November 13, 1957. They have also been attributed to Gerald L. K. Smith, who had written them in his magazine, The Cross and the Flag. Since 2009, when the quote was first attributed to Rogers, it has been regularly attributed to him; even though Rogers was essentially quoting Eastland or Smith at the time.

== Death ==
In November 2005, Rogers contracted pneumonia of both lungs as a complication of colon cancer treatments, and died following a period of mechanical ventilation at the age of seventy-four.

== Selected works ==
- Adrian Rogers SBC Pastor's Conference Sermons Video Recordings
- Believe in Miracles but Trust in Jesus
- Mastering Your Emotions
- God's Way to Health, Wealth and Wisdom
- The Power of His Presence
- Ten Secrets for a Successful Family
- Unveiling the End Times in Our Time
- The Incredible Power of Kingdom Authority
- What Every Christian Ought to Know
- Standing for Light and Truth
- Adrianisms (posthumous collection of quotes)
- Grace for the Widow (posthumous collection of unpublished material in appendix; book is written by his wife Joyce, to be published January 2009)

== See also ==
- List of Southern Baptist Convention affiliated people
- Southern Baptist Convention Presidents
- Southern Baptist Convention conservative resurgence

== Notes ==
Preceded by Jimmy Allen	President of the Southern Baptist Convention; 1979–1980	Succeeded by Bailey Smith

Preceded by Charles F. Stanley	President of the Southern Baptist Convention; 1987-1988	Succeeded by Jerry Vines
