= Hickory Grove Baptist Church =

Coordinates: 35.2222°N 80.7252°W

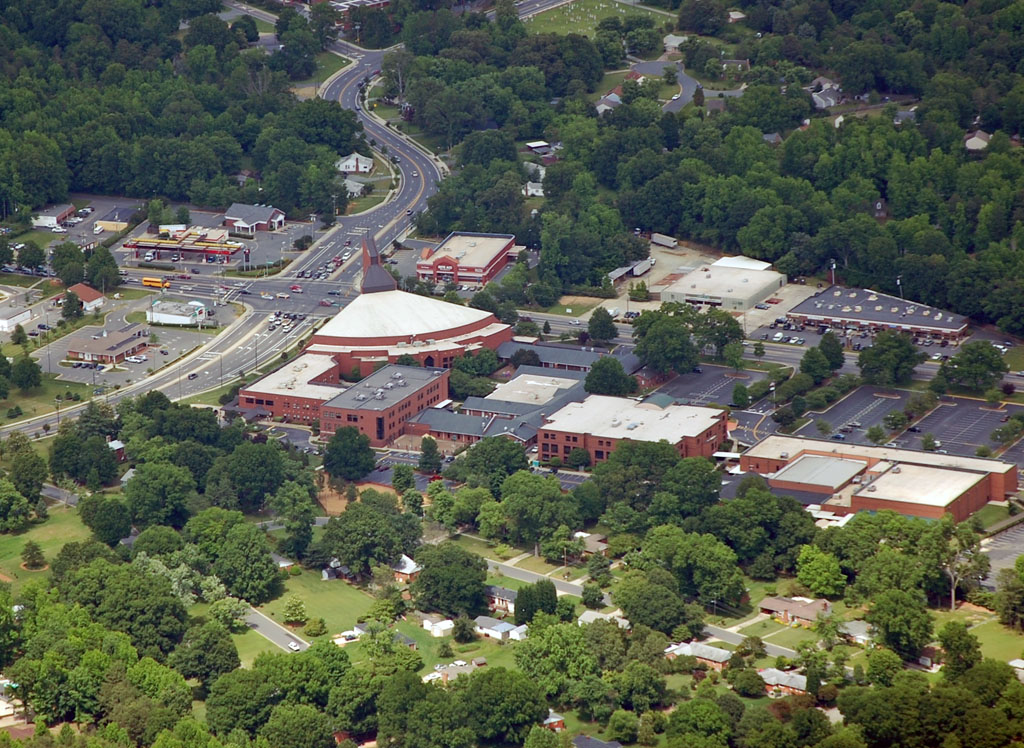
- Hickory Grove Baptist Church
- Location: Charlotte, NC
- Country: United States
- Denomination: Baptist
- Website: HickoryGrove.org

History
- Founded: 1955
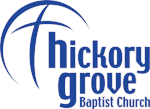

Hickory Grove Baptist Church is a Baptist multi-site megachurch based in Charlotte, North Carolina. It is affiliated with the Southern Baptist Convention. It is pastored by Rev. Clint Pressley.

== History ==
Hickory Grove Baptist Church was established in October 1955 with a vision to reach the people in the Hickory Grove community in east Charlotte. First meeting in homes, then in a schoolhouse and later in an unused dairy barn, the first pastor was Rev. Charles W. Wagner. On October 19, 1955, The church voted to buy 14 acres of land at the corner of Hickory Grove and Delta Roads. From 1958 until 1968, the Rev. D. J. Abernathy was pastor. The church inaugurated a new building in 1966. For a combined 16 months in 1969, the church was without a full-time pastor after Abernathy resigned from Hickory Grove in June 1968. Hickory Grove had two interim pastors Dr. George Moore who served for 7 months and the Rev. Clyde Yates for 9 months. On November 1st of that year, Dr. Raymond I. Samuelson became the new pastor.

This vision grew as Hickory Grove started a satellite location in northern Mecklenburg County in 1995. As of August 2009, the church has grown to over 18,000 members and is the second largest Baptist church in North Carolina. The Mallard Creek campus, located in the Concord Mills area, is located at 13200 Mallard Creek Road, Charlotte, NC, 28262.

On January 30, 2011, The congregation of Hickory Grove Baptist Church affirmed the Rev. Clint Pressley as the new Senior Pastor of Hickory Grove. Rev. Pressley attended the church as a teenager, and was a pastor at Hickory Grove, under Dr. Joe B. Brown, before leaving to serve at Alabama's Dauphin Way Baptist Church. Rev. Pressley returned as Co-Pastor in 2010 and was voted in as Senior Pastor in 2011.
