= Mid-America Baptist Theological Seminary =

Baptist educational institution in Tennessee, US

Coordinates: 35.18256°N 89.814434°W

Mid-America Baptist Theological Seminary is a Baptist theological institute located in Arlington in Shelby County, Tennessee (east of the City of Memphis). Dedicated to its mission of equipping biblical leaders, Mid-America offers fully accredited degree programs including graduate degrees through the Seminary and undergraduate degrees through Mid-America College. Mid-America's beliefs and practices are aligned with the conservative wing of the Southern Baptist Convention, though it is not operated by the denomination itself.

== History ==
Mid-America's founder and first President, Dr. B. Gray Allison, possessed a commitment to biblical inerrancy, expository preaching, and the Great Commission that continues to permeate the school today. The school was founded in 1971 as the "School of the Prophets" in Louisiana, but no classes were held. The following year, it was moved to Little Rock, Arkansas, and the name was changed to Mid-America Baptist Theological Seminary, and it began classes with four professors and 28 students. In 1975, the school moved to Memphis, Tennessee, on the old campus of Temple Israel. In 1996, the school moved to a larger campus in South Germantown, Tennessee, in the quarters of the old Germantown Baptist Church. In 2006, the school moved to Cordova, Tennessee, across the street from the Bellevue Baptist Church into a new $28 million facility located on 51 acres (35 donated by Bellevue and 16 purchased by the Seminary). In 2026, Mid-America moved to a state-of-the-art new campus located at 5640 Airline Road in Arlington, Tennessee.

Throughout its more than 50-year history, Mid-America has had only two Presidents, founder Dr. B. Gray Allison, and current President, Dr. Michael R. Spradlin, who became president in 1997. Both its founding President and current President have maintained three focal points for which the school has been known: the Bible, missions, and evangelism. These hallmarks have set the school apart from other institutions and guided the faculty, students, and alumni in their training and ministries.

== Leadership ==
The school has remained independent, innovative, and influential throughout its history, steadfastly holding to its conservative biblical moorings even during the 1970s and 1980s when other institutions affiliated with the Southern Baptist Convention drifted away from conservative biblical roots.

In addition to its uncompromising stand on biblical inerrancy and sufficiency, other examples of the school's leadership include the establishment of the Northeast Campus in Schenectady, New York, in 1987, help to train pastors and biblical leaders in a U.S. region that is largely unchurched. The school continued to grow in the 1990s, reaching the milestones of awarding 1,000 academic degrees by 1991 and witnessing 100,000 professions of faith by 1994 through its distinctive Practical Missions program. As early as 2006, Mid-America began offering online courses, and by 2015, the school offered full degrees online. In another strategy that underlines the school's evangelistic heartbeat, Mid-America began in 2017 presenting the Mid-America Passion Play directed by renown worship leader Dr. James Whitmire. In 2019, a campus was established at the Varner Unit prison in Varner, Arkansas and another in 2021 at the Limon Correctional Facility prison in Limon, Colorado. Also, in 2019, Dr. Jay E. Adams, father of the modern-day biblical counseling movement, entrusted his Institute for Nouthetic Studies (INS) to Mid-America, including all of his published works and the INS Publishing company. This merger helped establish Mid-America as a leader in biblical counseling training.

== Distinctives ==
Mid-America's history of leadership and innovation led it to establish its slogan, "Light the Way." Mid-America strives to maintain distinctive benefits to its students by offering the following unique advantages:

- Donor-supported, low-cost tuition
- Debt-free graduation so that graduates can pursue ministry opportunities unencumbered by student debt
- Academic excellence
- Involved faculty who are active in their local churches and high accessible to students
- Practical missions programs that provide students with real-world ministry and leadership experience
- Alumni who are connected to the school for a lifetime

== Academic Programs ==
Mid-America currently offers 39 degree programs and is accredited by the Southern Association of Colleges and Schools Commission on Colleges (SACSCOC) to award associate, baccalaureate, masters, and doctoral degrees. Mid-America also offers credentials such as certificates and diplomas at approved degree levels.

Masters-level programs include a wide range of MA and MDIV degrees, such as:

- Master of Arts in Apologetics
- Master of Arts in Biblical Counseling
- Master of Arts in Christian Ministries
- Master of Arts in Missiology and Intercultural Studies
- Master of Arts in Theology
- Master of Arts in Worship
- Accelerated Master of Divinity
- Master of Divinity in Apologetics
- Master of Divinity in Biblical Counseling
- Master of Divinity in Christian Ministries
- Master of Divinity in Missiology and Intercultural Studies
- Master of Divinity in Pastoral Ministries
- Master of Divinity in Urban Church Planting

Mid-America also offers doctoral programs, including Doctor of Philosophy (PhD) and Doctor of Ministry (DMIN) programs, each with an array of specializations.

Undergraduate degree programs are offered through Mid-America College, including Associate, Bachelor of Arts, Bachelor of Science, and select Master of Arts degree programs. All Mid-America degree programs are accredited and available fully online.
