= Bellevue Baptist Church =

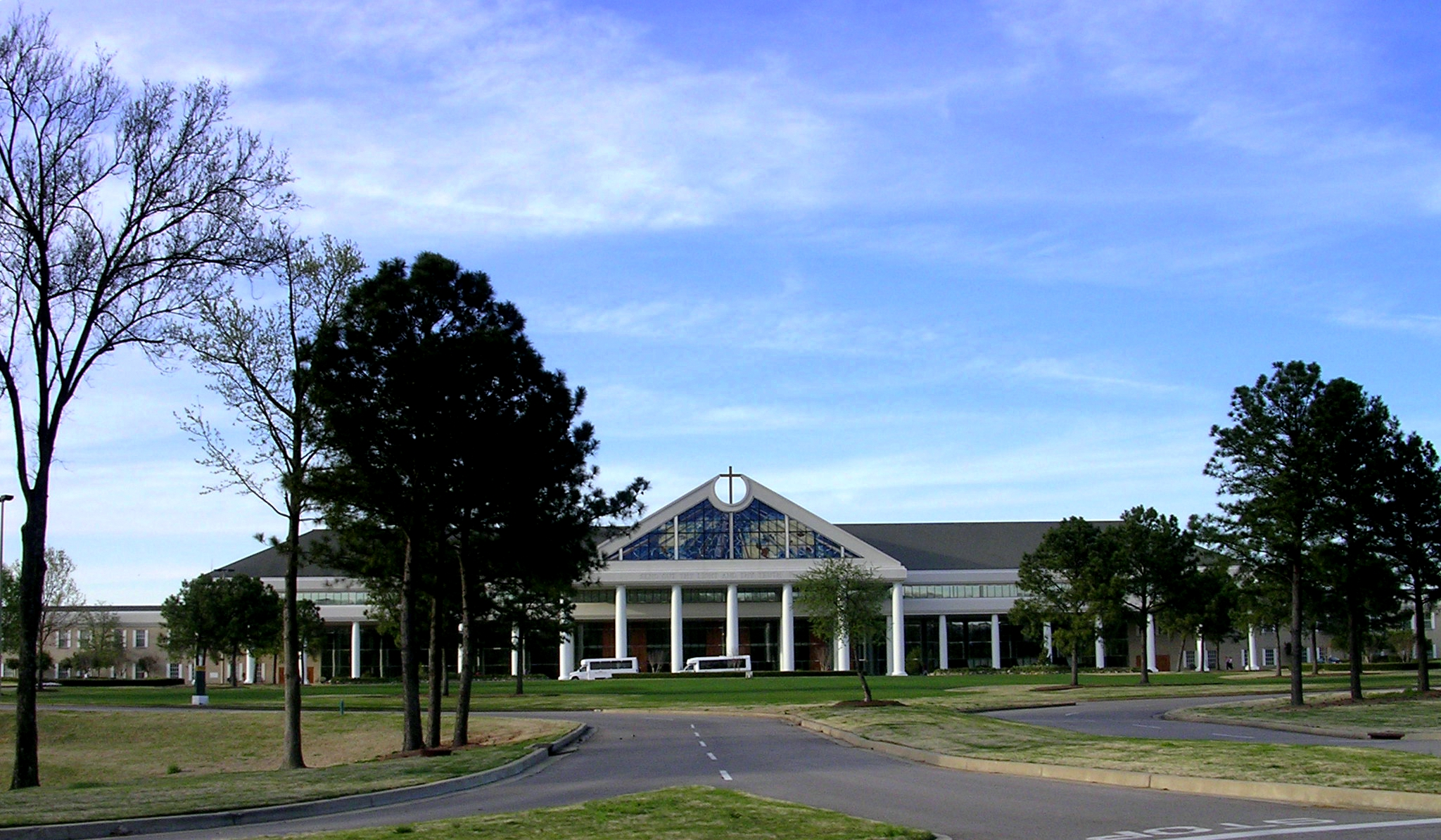
- Bellevue Baptist Church in 2006
- Bellevue Baptist Church
- 35.181556°N 89.808136°W
- Location: Cordova, Tennessee
- Country: United States
- Denomination: Southern Baptist Convention
- Website: www.bellevue.org

History
- Founded: 1903
- Founder(s): Thomas Potts and Central Baptist Church

Bellevue Baptist Church is a Baptist megachurch in the Cordova area of Memphis, Tennessee, United States. It is affiliated with the Southern Baptist Convention. Bellevue was once the largest church in the Memphis area. Bellevue's goals are to "Love God, Love People, Share Jesus, and Make Disciples." The church's head pastor is Ben Mandrell as of August 2025.

== History ==
Bellevue Baptist was founded in 1903 by Central Baptist Church as a mission church on the outskirts of Memphis. With a small $1,000 gift from member Fannie Jobe, Pastor Thomas Potts led the congregation to build a one-room stone chapel at the corner of Bellevue and Erskine Avenues. The first service was held on July 12, 1903, with Bellevue's first pastor, Henry Hurt. Thirty-two founding members signed the official charter on August 9, 1903. The church completed a 3,000 seat building located at 70 N. Bellevue in 1952, which was one of the first air-conditioned churches in Memphis. Bellevue became one of the largest Southern Baptist churches in the United States in the 1950s with more than 9,000 members. The church relocated to its current building (2000 Appling Road), which seats 7,000 in the main sanctuary, on a 377-acre (153 ha) campus in Cordova, a Memphis suburb, in 1989. Bellevue is ranked 80th in the largest and fasting growing churches in America by LifeWay Research for Outreach Magazine. The attendance has been up to 6,567.

The church's location near Interstate 40 is marked by a display of three crosses. A ceremony held to dedicate and light the crosses took place on New Year's Eve, 1999. As the clock ticked down the final moments of the millennium, the Bellevue family worshipped at the foot of the cross. At the stroke of midnight, the crosses were illuminated. They are visible from several miles away. The center cross is 150 feet (46 m) tall, flanked by two 120-foot (37 m) crosses.

Mid-America Baptist Theological Seminary was located on 51 acres (21 ha) across the street from Bellevue (35 acres (14 ha) were donated by Bellevue). However, Mid-America operates independently from Bellevue. Nevertheless, the Seminary has maintained a close relationship with the congregation ever since it moved to Memphis in 1976; former Bellevue pastor Adrian Rogers was an influential figure at MABTS.

== Leadership ==
Bellevue has been led by only five pastors since 1927. The first service was held on July 12, 1903, with Bellevue's first pastor, Henry Hurt, saying that he hoped the new church would become “one of the greatest powers for good” that the city of Memphis had ever seen. Hurt served as pastor for the first 11 years, resigning because of poor health in 1914. When his health improved, he later served as pastor of Union Avenue Baptist Church in Memphis. He also served on the building committee for Baptist Memorial Hospital and as commissioner for the Memphis Housing Authority. A two-story wooden frame building was added to the original stone structure in 1910, with evening services sometimes held on the rooftop. Richard M. Inlow served as pastor from 1915 to 1920, followed by William M. Bostick, pastor from 1920 to 1927. Because of the growth in membership, a 1,000-seat auditorium was constructed on Bellevue Avenue, replacing the stone chapel. Dedication for the new building was March 16, 1924.

=== Robert G. Lee (1927–1960) ===
On December 11, 1927, Robert Greene Lee preached his first sermon to the congregation at Bellevue. The membership was 1,430 when he became the church's fourth pastor. Lee was born in a log cabin on November 11, 1886. The son of a South Carolina sharecropper, he worked his way through school, ultimately graduating with a doctorate in international law from University of Chicago Law School in 1919. Lee preached the sermon Pay-Day Someday more than 1,200 times at Bible conferences, in state capitol buildings, churches, universities, youth camps, and ballparks across the nation and around the world.

At the time of his death on July 20, 1978, an estimated 3 million people had heard him preach Pay-Day Someday. To accommodate the crowds that came to hear Lee preach the hour-long sermon each year on the first Sunday in May, Bellevue moved services to Ellis Auditorium in Memphis. In 1954, Westminster Films captured him in Technicolor delivering his signature sermon. Lee authored 56 books, written primarily from his sermons.

While he was pastor of Bellevue, Lee served three consecutive terms as president of the Southern Baptist Convention: 1949, 1950, and 1951. Presiding at the 1951 meeting in San Francisco, he introduced a young Billy Graham to the SBC. Years later, Graham paid tribute to Lee at his death calling him "one of the towering giants of the 20th century". Church membership grew steadily, and Lee led the way for construction of a new sanctuary to seat 3,000, with the capacity to seat 600 more. The new building was located on the same block where the original stone chapel had stood. When Lee retired in 1960 after serving as pastor for 32 years, Bellevue's membership had grown to 9,200, making it the largest Baptist church east of the Mississippi River and the second largest church in the Southern Baptist Convention.

Under Lee's leadership, a church tradition began during the Great Depression. In December 1934, Lee called for a special "love offering" to help pay off the church building debt. The goal was set at $30,000, but church members contributed $36,000. The tradition continues today, with an annual offering taken before Thanksgiving. Facility construction and campus improvements are financed through the offering, along with local and foreign mission endeavors.

=== Ramsey Pollard (1960–1972) ===
William Ramsey Pollard was pastor of Broadway Baptist Church in Knoxville, Tennessee, when Robert G. Lee retired. On Easter Sunday, April 17, 1960, the church voted to call him as pastor after he preached at Bellevue. He continued to preach as an evangelist until his death on April 26, 1984. He was named Pastor Emeritus in 1979. Pollard received the top achievement award for evangelism from the Tennessee Baptist Convention in 1962, and he was president of the board of World Evangelism Foundation of Dallas, Texas. He was elected president of Southern Baptist Convention in 1959 and unanimously re-elected in 1960. During Pollard's twelve years at Bellevue, the church hosted an annual Medical Professional Day. Bellevue financed and constructed a branch church, first known as Lauderdale Heights Baptist Church and later as City View Baptist Church. An activities building was added in 1966 for evangelistic outreach as well as for the congregation. In honor of the Pollards, it was named the Pollard Activities Building in 1970. Mrs. Pollard founded the Tennessee Ministers' Wives Association. In 1965 the Pollards organized a church group for senior citizens.

=== Adrian Rogers (1972–2005) ===
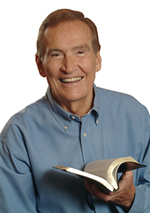
Adrian Rogers

The church's most well-known leader, Adrian Rogers, was the senior pastor of Bellevue Baptist from 1972 until March 2005. During this period, the church's membership grew from 9,000 to over 29,000. The 40-year-old native Floridian was pastor of First Baptist Church in Merritt Island, Florida. On August 13, 1972, at the request of the search committee, Rogers preached his first sermon at Bellevue. That morning after he preached, the congregation unanimously voted for Rogers as the next pastor. In June 1972, members of the pulpit search committee traveled to Philadelphia to hear Adrian Rogers preach at the Southern Baptist Convention Pastors Conference. In 1979, Rogers was elected on the first ballot as president of the Southern Baptist Convention, the world's largest Protestant denomination. During a period of theological controversy within the SBC, Rogers helped to lead the SBC back to its historical roots of biblical inerrancy, an effort known as the "Conservative Resurgence". He was elected president of the SBC again in 1986 and 1987. In 2000, he headed a SBC committee charged with revising the denomination's statement of faith, The Baptist Faith and Message. In 1996, the Religious Heritage of America named Rogers Clergyman of the Year, and in 2003, he was inducted into the National Religious Broadcasters Hall of Fame. Rogers consulted and prayed personally with four U.S. Presidents (including Ronald Reagan), and was invited by George W. Bush to speak at the National Day of Prayer in 2001. In 1994, he was asked by Focus on the Family founder and president, James Dobson, to serve on the organization's board of directors. Rogers published 21 books and 52 booklets, including Adrianisms, two volumes of his quotes. His biography, Love Worth Finding: The Life of Adrian Rogers and His Philosophy of Preaching, was published in 2005. Upon his retirement in 2005, Rogers was named Pastor Emeritus. At his retirement celebration on March 4, the Memphis City Council honored Rogers by naming a segment of Appling Road that runs in front of the west entrance, the Adrian P. Rogers Parkway. Before Steve Gaines preached his first sermon as Bellevue's seventh pastor on September 11, 2005, Rogers demonstrated his support for his successor in the morning worship services by washing Gaines' feet and placing a cloth mantel across his shoulders to symbolize the transfer of leadership. On November 15, 2005, Rogers died of complications following colon cancer treatment at age 74. More than 10,000 attended his memorial service at Bellevue on November 17, 2005. Local television station WPTY and Daystar Christian Television network broadcast the service live. Speakers included James Dobson of Focus on the Family and Rogers' successor, Steve Gaines.

=== Steve Gaines (2005–2025) ===
On July 10, 2005, members voted to make Steve Gaines the new pastor. Gaines previously served as pastor at First Baptist Church in Gardendale, Alabama; a suburb of Birmingham, for fourteen years. His first sermon as new pastor at Bellevue was on September 11, 2005. Since 1996, Gaines had preached once a year at Bellevue by Rogers' invitation. After eight months of reviewing potential candidates for senior pastor, the search committee reached a unanimous decision. In the 14 years that Gaines was the senior pastor in Gardendale, 3,251 people were baptized, leading the Alabama Baptist State Convention in baptisms seven out of ten years. For Easter 2005, First Baptist Gardendale held community-wide services at the Birmingham-Jefferson Convention Complex with more 10,000 attending. A graduate of Union University with a master's and doctorate degrees from Southwestern Baptist Theological Seminary, he served on the 2000 Baptist Faith and Message revision committee for the Southern Baptist Convention along with the committee chairman, Adrian Rogers. In seminary, Gaines received the H.C. Brown Jr. Preaching Award for Outstanding Achievements in the study and practice of preaching. The evangelism faculty also presented him with the W. Fred Swank Evangelism Award.

Gaines was the only Southwestern Seminary graduate to receive both awards. He was ordained to the ministry in 1980 by his hometown church First Baptist Church of Dyersburg, Tennessee. He pastored churches in Texas and in west Tennessee before becoming pastor of Gardendale's First Baptist Church. On March 20, 2026, Gaines died of kidney cancer at age 68.

=== Ben Mandrell (2025–present) ===
Ben Mandrell was voted as Bellevue's eighth senior pastor on July 8, 2025.

== Theology ==
Under Rogers, Bellevue was a key supporter of the conservative faction within the Southern Baptist Convention during the "conservative/moderate" controversy of the 1970s and 1980s (Rogers served as SBC President for three terms). It remains a conservative, evangelical body today.

== Missions ==
Since 1903, Bellevue has been active in local and foreign missions. Pastor Robert G. Lee preached in Japan and Korea in 1955. Through the Southern Baptist Mission Board in 1962, Pastor Ramsey Pollard led Bellevue in being the first church to adopt a Cuban refugee family and help establish them in America. Pastor Adrian Rogers led missions crusades in Brazil (1990) and Romania (1992) with many church members participating. In 1999, the church began a missions emphasis in Central America, with the goal of planting churches. Bellevue continues to send out mission teams all over the world each year, spending $5.5 million, one-fourth of its $22 million annual budget on missions. In 2007 a missions team from Bellevue's women's ministry led a conference in Hyderabad, India. Bellevue has also planted churches in Honduras, Uruguay and Nicaragua. Bellevue teams have also worked in Seattle, WA; Vancouver, BC; and the Dakotas.

== Controversies ==
=== Relocation ===
After being located in the heart of Midtown, Memphis for over 80 years, Bellevue relocated to its current campus in Cordova. By 1983 additions to Midtown campus encompassed a city block. On October 30, 1983, the membership voted to move to the current campus, completing the move in 1989. Bellevue's main reasoning behind the move to the other side of the city, besides needing more room, was that its membership had changed, with the majority of it now located in the eastern part of the Memphis metro area. The new campus would be closer to 60 percent of the members' residences. Groundbreaking for the 7,000-seat worship center was July 19, 1987. On Sunday, November 19, 1989, overflow crowds attended back-to-back morning worship services at 2000 Appling Road in Cordova. In 1991 the church opened Bellevue Woods, a retirement residence near the church. A family life center, preschool wing, athletic complex, and multipurpose wing with a west lobby entrance were added to the worship center and two original wings in subsequent years. Property debts were paid off in 2001. Mississippi Boulevard Christian Church purchased the Midtown property at 70 N. Bellevue in 1992.

The move created some controversy both in the city and church communities. Some saw it as Bellevue abandoning a community that could use the church while others saw it as a growing issue of white flight.

=== Website ===
In September 2006, The Commercial Appeal, Memphis' predominant newspaper, reported that recent changes at Bellevue led to protests by some members. A website contained allegations by some church members that the church was, under the leadership of Gaines, moving toward becoming part of the "church growth movement", moving toward an elder-led (as opposed to congregation-led) form of governance, mismanaging its finances, paying its leadership too much, intimidating members that want the church's leadership to be more open, and otherwise "moving away from its traditional roots." According to Bellevue's leadership, information on the website appeared and disappeared repeatedly, and quotes and information about church leadership decisions were taken out of context. In response to the site's accusations, Gaines said that the church was not leaving its traditional roots, was not a part of the church growth movement, and that the website was creating confusion.

On September 24, 2006, Gaines addressed the criticism during the evening church service. Other newspaper articles discussing subsequent developments followed in October.

In November, 2006, the church formed a communication committee to address the controversy. In mid-November, a website was launched by the committee. The Communication Committee's site discussed recent reviews of the pastor's credit card expenses. According to the site, deacons from the church met on November 5 and reviewed Gaines' credit card charges, unanimously finding no inappropriate expenditures. The Communication Committee's website has since been taken down.

=== Handling of minister misconduct ===
On December 17, 2006, the church announced that Paul Williams, a minister and staffer at the church for 34 years, had been placed on leave with an investigation pending regarding a "moral failure," identified by Gaines and others as alleged child molestation in the 1980s. The next day, December 18, Gaines released a statement that acknowledged that he had been aware of the allegation since June 2006 but that he did not address it for several months because Williams had been attending professional counseling, because of confidentiality concerns, and out of compassion for the staffer.

On January 29, 2007, Bellevue members formed a non-profit called "Integrity Does Count" with the aim of restoring congregational awareness of church finances to the congregation. This group was limited to 50 voting members in order to avoid having an infiltration by those opposed to it, although the actual group was much larger. Among other concerns, a principal concern was that the traditionally conservative leadership had been replaced with a more progressive regime which resulted in the donation of $20,000 to a church of another denomination, which openly supported homosexual relationships and abortion. Some church members argued that this aim is contrary to Bellevue's historical philosophy of being "pastor-led, deacon-served, committee-operated and congregation-approved." The group, "Integrity Does Count" disbanded within a year, after submitting request to obtain financial documents to which they were entitled under state law from the church and being denied the right to review any financial information. The members of the group wishing to follow biblical guidelines and convinced that they would be forced to pursue their request through the secular court system, decided to no longer pursue their quest.

== Accomplishments ==
In July 2007, Bellevue Baptist was named one of the top 50 most influential churches in the country, coming in 38th. This was the first time Bellevue was included in the top 50 most influential churches in the United States. The survey was tabulated through more than 2,000 emails being sent to non-Catholic church leaders.

In the late 2000s, Bellevue Baptist Church developed an in-house, web-based church management system with congregant and software developer David Carroll. The system became known as Bellevue Church Management System (BVCMS) and was later adopted by other congregations; by the mid-2010s it was rebranded as TouchPoint Software (2015).

== Music and theater ==
The Bellevue's Girls Quartet, formed in 1928, sang at conferences and denominational meetings across the South. Bellevue's drama ministry, organized in 1951, was the first drama ministry in the Southern Baptist Convention. The ground floor of the 1952 sanctuary was designed for Christian theatre presentations like “The Robe” (1957, 1959) and “Ben Hur” (1961). In 1948, Bellevue called Thomas P. Lane to build a comprehensive music program for children through adults. He was the first full-time minister of music in the Southern Baptist Convention, and when he retired 38 years later, he had the longest tenure of any Southern Baptist Convention minister of music. For more than three decades, he directed the student nurse choir at Baptist Memorial Hospital known as the Nightingales. Lane served with three Bellevue pastors who were each elected Southern Baptist Convention president: Robert G. Lee, Ramsey Pollard, and Adrian Rogers. For the community they presented 38 consecutive performances of Handel's Messiah, as well as other classical works like The Seven Last Words of Christ and Mendelssohn's Elijah. Lane was awarded the Southern Baptist Convention's Church Music Award for Outstanding Service, and, in 1986, he was named Bellevue's Minister of Music Emeritus.

Rogers served with two ministers of music: Thomas P. Lane and James D. Whitmire. After working together as pastor and minister of music at First Baptist Church in Merritt Island, Florida, Rogers and Whitmire reunited at Bellevue in 1975. Whitmire was minister of youth music until Lane's retirement in 1986. In December 2005, when he retired as senior minister of music, 5,000 adults and children were enrolled in Bellevue's vocal and instrumental programs. Whitmire premiered The Singing Christmas Tree in 1976, with a record attendance of high 56,000.

== Broadcasting ==
On January 5, 1958, Bellevue became the first church in the world to broadcast worship services using its own television equipment. Under Pollard's leadership the church continued broadcasting services, upgrading to color cameras and equipment in 1970. Rather than sell it, the congregation voted to donate the original black and white television cameras and equipment to missions. Bellevue continued to broadcast services locally until 2025.

== Crosses on Interstate 40 ==
Three large crosses, visible from Interstate 40, mark the church's location. The center cross is 150 feet (46 m) high with two flanking crosses at 120 feet (37 m). The crosses are engineered to withstand 70-mile-per-hour (110 km/h) winds and are constructed of four pieces of structural steel and angle iron painted white. The landmark crosses were dedicated at a special ceremony with choir, orchestra, and hundreds of church members at midnight on New Year's Eve, 1999. In September 2008, the three crosses became the central image in the church logo.

== Bellevue Loves Memphis ==
In 2007, Gaines initiated a church-wide, ongoing volunteer ministry to Memphis and the community. On September 28, 2009, the State of Tennessee House of Representatives issued a proclamation recognizing Bellevue as an institution that has demonstrated “unflagging capacity for love, dedication of spirit, and faith in God” and for enriching the lives of people in their community. The proclamation cited pastor Gaines for leading the way in showing "Jesus' love to the City of Memphis by meeting practical needs of residents" and for "embracing Bellevue Loves Memphis as a way of life." The document mentioned the church's sponsor of a Christian Mobile Dental Clinic that provides free dental care to the underprivileged, and the church's funding of The Vue, a ministry for college students located near the University of Memphis and accessible to students of other local colleges and universities. The proclamation noted that on six workdays, 5,300 volunteers have contributed between 30,000 and 35,000 hours through yard work, painting, construction, and more to benefit 40 schools, two post-secondary schools, 44 churches, 55 family homes, 14 parks, nine city/government buildings, 16 hospitals, 47 ministries, and ten Memphis City School football fields. The proclamation also noted that Bellevue Loves Memphis provided every city fire station with a copy of the movie Fireproof, assisted with the City of Memphis cleanup, and assisted with ten block parties. The document also recognized the church for hosting the Tennessee Technology Center's 2008-2009 graduation. In 2009, Pastor Gaines was awarded the Open Door Award for his leadership with Bellevue Loves Memphis. The annual award is presented by the April 4th Foundation of Memphis. From 2008 to 2013, the church opened its doors to city and county schools for holding their commencement exercises. An annual Fourth of July celebration, Starlight Spectacular, also drew thousands from the community.

== See also ==
- Monumental cross
