= Ed Litton =

American pastor

- Church: Redemption Church
- Installed: 1994

Personal details
- Born: Harry Edward Litton Jr. July 17, 1959 (age 66) Kingsport, Tennessee, U.S.
- Denomination: Baptist (Southern Baptist Convention)
- Spouse: Tammy Litton (died 2007); Kathy Litton
- Children: 3
- Occupation: Pastor, 63rd President of the Southern Baptist Convention (June 16, 2021 - June 15, 2022)
- Education: Grand Canyon University (BA); Southwestern Baptist Theological Seminary (MDiv); Southern Baptist Theological Seminary (DMin)

Harry Edward (Ed) Litton Jr. (born July 17, 1959) is an American evangelical pastor who serves as the senior pastor of Redemption Church in Saraland, Alabama. He was the president of the Southern Baptist Convention from June 2021 to June 2022.

== Early life and education ==
Litton was born at Kingsport, Tennessee's Holston Valley Community Hospital on July 17, 1959, to Harry and Sue Litton.

He graduated from Grand Canyon University in 1983 with a Bachelor of Arts degree in religion and theater. He later received a Master of Divinity from Southwestern Baptist Theological Seminary and a Doctor of Ministry degree from the Southern Baptist Theological Seminary.

== Career ==
Litton began his career as a pastor at churches in Arizona and Texas. Since 1994, he has served as the pastor of Redemption Church in Saraland, Alabama. He was elected president of the Southern Baptist Convention in June 2021 on the second ballot with 52 percent of the vote and a margin of 556 votes.

Litton has been described by news outlets as ideologically moderate, but identifies himself as both politically and theologically conservative. He is known for his work on race issues in the greater Mobile, Alabama, area and in the Southern Baptist Convention, and was nominated and endorsed for the SBC presidency by Fred Luter, the only black pastor to ever serve as the president of the convention.

Following a May 2022 report detailing nearly two decades of SBC leadership stonewalling and disparaging clergy sex abuse survivors, Litton urged the organization "to take deliberate action to address these failures and chart a new course."

Litton announced that he would not stand for re-election as SBC President at the 2022 Annual Meeting, choosing instead to focus on racial reconciliation.

== Personal life ==
Litton's first wife, Tammy, was killed in a car accident in 2007. His current wife, Kathy (who was also widowed from her first marriage), was a director with the Southern Baptist Convention's North American Mission Board and the denomination's first woman registration secretary. He has three children from his first marriage.

Litton has appeared in two Christian films, playing minor roles in each:

- Courageous, as Pastor Rogers
- I Still Believe, as the Dean of Students

He also appeared in one episode of the religious documentary series Faith Nation being interviewed as SBC President.

== Plagiarism allegations ==
In June 2021, Litton was accused of plagiarism after a YouTube user published a video showing him preaching a sermon that bloggers on social media described as strikingly similar to a sermon preached a year earlier by J. D. Greear. Further videos were released of sermons Litton preached on Romans 13 Romans 14, and the Book of Acts, all of which were compared to sermons preached by Greear.

Some media outlets described the controversy as Sermongate. Newsweek and The Washington Post reported that Litton's church had removed videos of over 140 sermons from their website. Litton released a statement on his church website admitting to using Greear's words without proper attribution. Textbooks on sermon preparation and delivery generally discourage such practices. Further allegations have now been made against Litton's co-pastor, Taylor Anderson, who also appears to have plagiarized a sermon by Greear.

Preceded by J.D. Greear	President of the Southern Baptist Convention; 2021–22	Succeeded by Bart Barber
