= Cross Church (Northwest Arkansas) =

Coordinates: 36.16857°N 94.15478°W

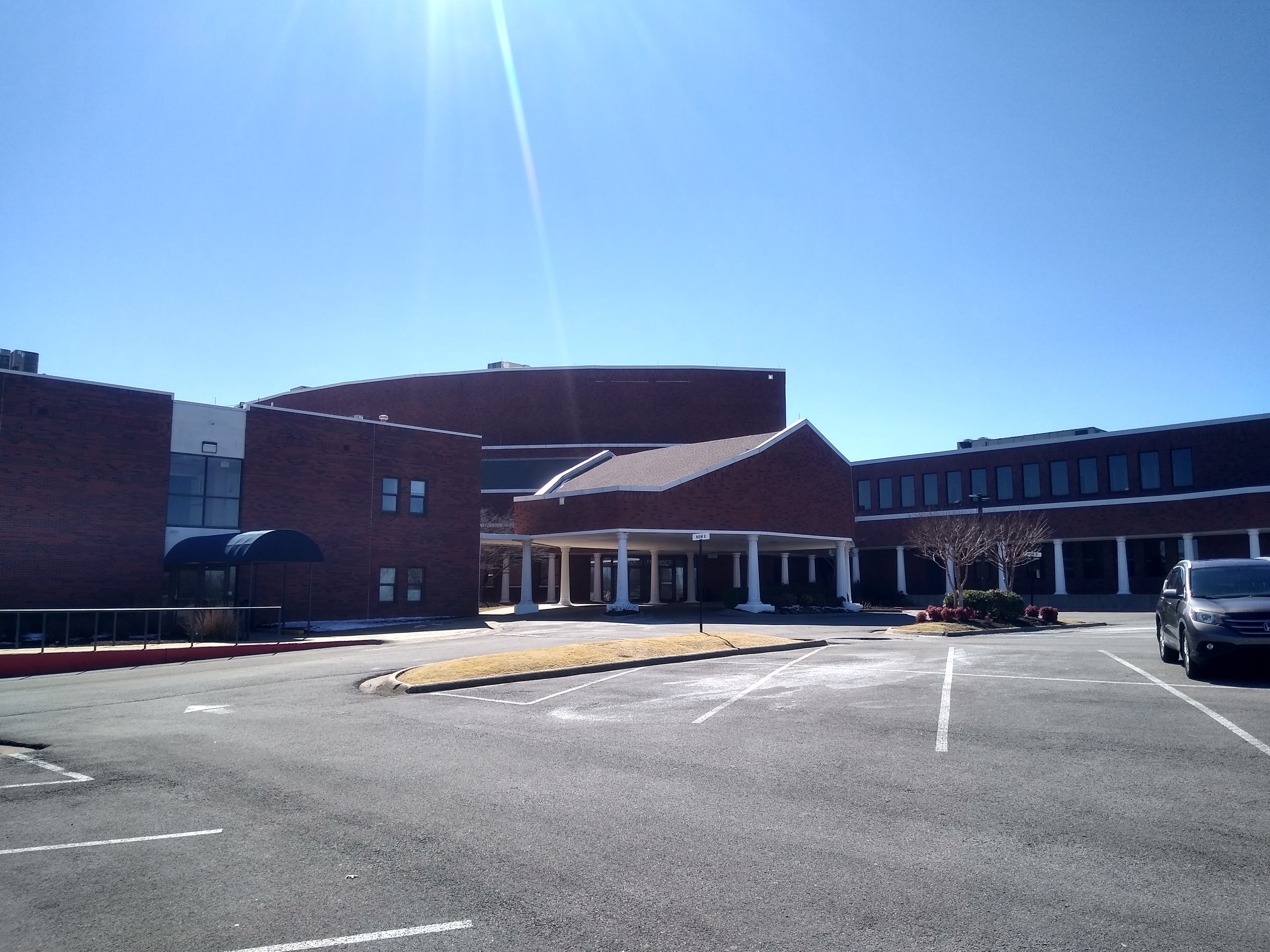
- Cross Church Springdale campus
- Cross Church
- Location: Springdale, Arkansas
- Country: United States
- Denomination: Baptist
- Website: crosschurch.com

Cross Church is a Baptist multi-site megachurch based in Springdale, Arkansas, United States. It is affiliated with the Southern Baptist Convention. Across its three campuses, Cross Church is one of the largest churches in the state of Arkansas. The senior pastor is Nick Floyd, son of Ronnie Floyd- longtime senior pastor of Cross Church for thirty years when he left to become full-time CEO of the Southern Baptist Convention.

== History ==
The church was founded in 1870 as Landmark Liberty Baptist Church. In 1910, the church was renamed as First Baptist Church of Springdale. Otto Whittington served as pastor from 1940 until 1945. For 16 years, the church was pastored by Cliff Palmer who began his tenure in 1970. In 1976, it founded the Shiloh Christian School. Dr. Ronnie Floyd would become pastor of the church in 1986.

In 2001, it opened a campus in Rogers (Pinnacle Hills). The church changed its name from First Baptist Church of Springdale to Cross Church in 2010.

In 2018, it claimed a weekly attendance of 8,959 people.

In 2019, Nick Floyd became the senior pastor, after the departure of his father Ronnie Floyd.
