= Fred Luter =

American pastor (born 1956)

- Former President of the Southern Baptist Convention
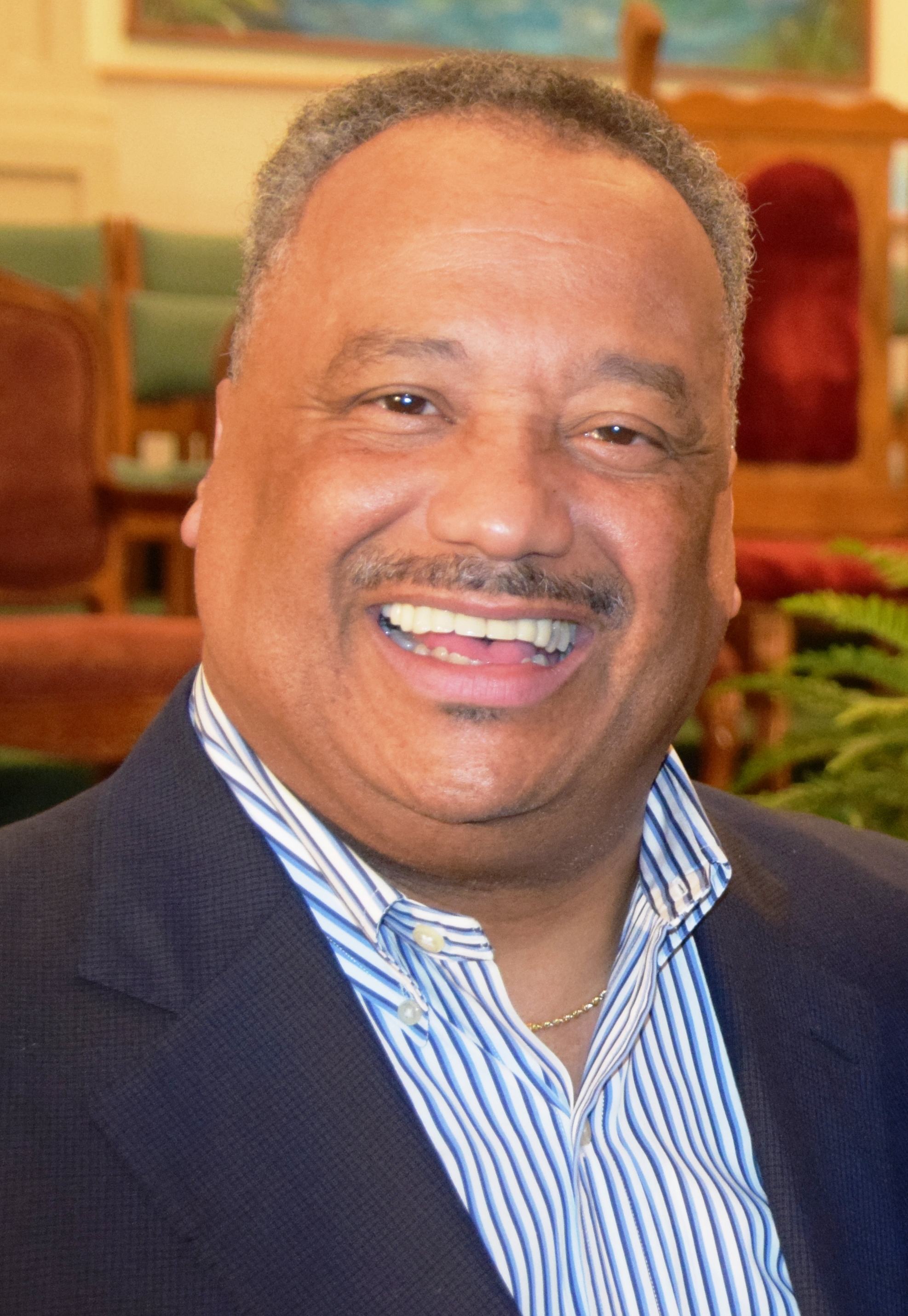
- Luter in 2015
- Church: Franklin Avenue Baptist Church
- Predecessor: Bryant Wright
- Successor: Fred "Chip" Luter III

Personal details
- Born: November 11, 1956 (age 69) New Orleans, Louisiana, US
- Denomination: Baptist (Southern Baptist Convention)
- Spouse: Elizabeth W. Luter
- Children: Kimberly Ann "Kim" Luter; Fred J. Luter III
- Occupation: Pastor; President, Southern Baptist Convention (2012-14)

Fred J. Luter Jr. (born November 11, 1956, in New Orleans) is an American Baptist pastor. He is the senior pastor of Franklin Avenue Baptist Church, based in New Orleans. He was the president of the Southern Baptist Convention from 2012 to 2014.

== Early life ==
Luter was born on November 11, 1956, in New Orleans. He was the middle child of five siblings and, after his parents divorced, was largely brought up single-handedly by his seamstress mother Viola Luter.

== Ministry ==
Luter had begun his ministry in 1977 in New Orleans' Lower Ninth Ward after he suffered a motorcycle accident. He has credited his motorcycling misadventure as his "road to Damascus moment"—his analogy to the conversion of Saul of Tarsus. He began as a street preacher at the corner of Caffin and Galvez. During his streetpreaching days Luter observed a need to draw men, particularly fathers, into his evangelistic appeal by urging events which attract male interest, on one occasion, in 1981, hosting a gathering for a pay-per-view televised boxing match between Thomas Hearns and Sugar Ray Leonard. His first sermon in a churchbuilding was in 1983 at New Orleans' Law Street Missionary Baptist Church. He was a staff minister at the city's Greater Liberty Baptist Church when he learned of the opening at Franklin Avenue and sought the job.

=== Franklin Avenue Baptist Church ===
In 1986, Luter became the senior pastor of Franklin Avenue Baptist Church, a church with 65 members. Before Hurricane Katrina struck in 2005, the congregation had grown to over 7000 members, making it the largest congregation affiliated with SBC in Louisiana. Luter led the rebuilding of the membership after the diaspora from Katrina, and as of his election to the Southern Baptist presidency the congregation had 5000 members. Luter's strategy for congregational growth is rooted in his concept "FRANgelism"—the acronym "FRAN" standing for friends, relatives, associates, and neighbors in acts of networking people into the life of the congregation.

=== Southern Baptist Convention ===
Luter was elected president of the Southern Baptist Convention on June 19, 2012, and was SBC's first African-American president.

On June 20, the day after electing Luter, the SBC voted to permit use of the designation "Great Commission" as an alternative to "Southern" for congregations desiring a break from the geographical and historical eponym. Nominated by David Crosby of New Orleans' First Baptist Church, Luter succeeded Bryant Wright of Johnson Ferry Baptist Church in Marietta, Georgia.

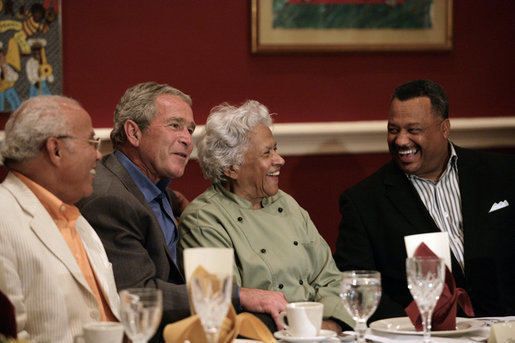
Fred Luter (right), with Norman Francis, George W. Bush and Leah Chase in 2007.

Luter cited "to improve racial harmony" as his goal on his reelection to the second (and final) year of SBC presidency.

== Personal life ==
In 1980, Luter married Elizabeth W. Luter. The couple has two children: daughter Kimberly Ann "Kim" Luter was born in 1982; son Fred J. "Chip" Luter III, born 1985, is a graduate of Dallas Baptist University and is also a Baptist minister. Elizabeth Luter (born 1956) is involved in LifeWay Women's Conferences.

In 2012, Luter received an honorary doctorate in theology from the Criswell College and the Oklahoma Baptist University for his commitment to excellence and concern for others.

== See also ==
- List of Southern Baptist Convention affiliated people
- Southern Baptist Convention
- Southern Baptist Convention Presidents

== Notes ==
Preceded by Bryant Wright	President of the Southern Baptist Convention; 2012–2014	Succeeded by Ronnie Floyd
