= Ronnie Floyd =

American pastor (born 1955)

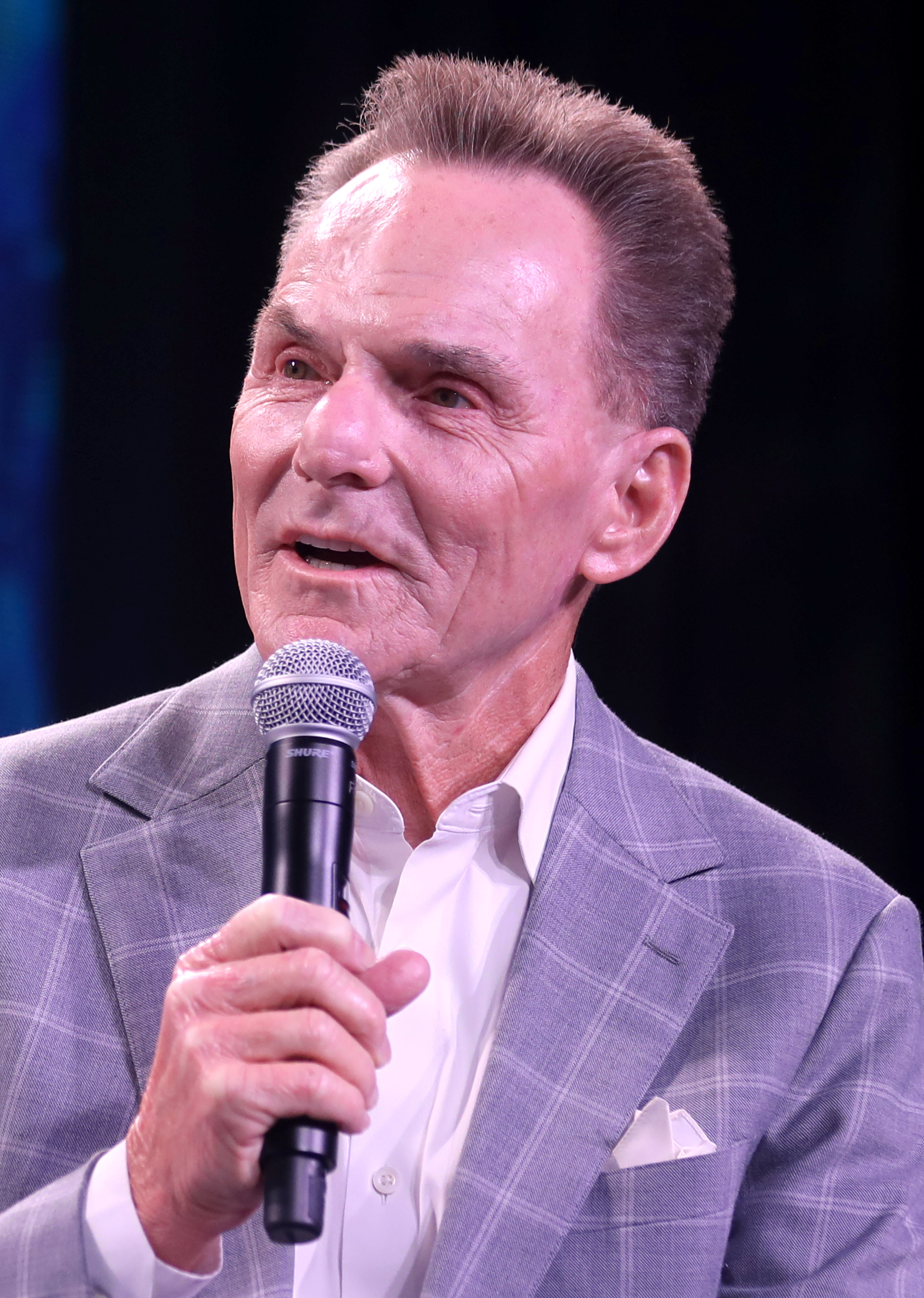
- Church: Cross Church

Personal details
- Born: Ronald Wayne Floyd; November 11, 1955 (age 70) Gonzales, Texas
- Denomination: Baptist (Southern Baptist Convention)
- Spouse: Jeana Floyd
- Children: 2
- Occupation: Chief Executive Officer, Executive Committee of the Southern Baptist Convention (2019-2021); Pastor, Cross Church (1986-2019); President, Southern Baptist Convention (2014-16)
- Education: B.S., Howard Payne University; M.Div., Southwestern Baptist Theological Seminary; D.Min., Southwestern Baptist Theological Seminary

Ronald Wayne Floyd (born November 11, 1955) is an American Baptist pastor, and a former Southern Baptist executive. Ronnie was the Senior Pastor of Cross Church (formerly called First Baptist Springdale), a Southern Baptist megachurch located in Northwest Arkansas, and served as the 61st president of the Southern Baptist Convention from 2014 to 2016. He resigned his post as senior pastor in 2019 to become the full-time CEO of the Southern Baptist Executive Committee and run the day-to-day operations of the denomination. His resignation on October 14, 2021, coincided with mounting pressure in the wake of the Southern Baptist Convention sexual abuse scandal.

== Early life and education ==
Floyd was born on 11 November 1955 in Gonzales, Texas. He obtained a Bachelor of Science degree from Howard Payne University in 1978, then attended Southwestern Baptist Theological Seminary where he obtained a Master of Divinity in 1980 and a Doctor of Ministry in 1983.

== Career ==
=== Pastor ===
Floyd was a pastor at First Baptist churches in Cherokee, Texas (1976–1978), Milford, Texas (1978–1981), Palacios, Texas (1981–1984) and Nederland, Texas (1984–1986).

A strong advocate of evangelism and discipleship, Floyd was a member of the "conservative resurgence" that retook control of the Southern Baptist Convention (SBC) during the 1980s. In 1989 he was a candidate to become president of the Arkansas Baptist State Convention, but was defeated by Mike Huckabee.

Floyd became Senior Pastor of First Baptist Church of Springdale in northwestern Arkansas, USA, in 1986. In 2001, Floyd led his congregation in the building and opening of a second campus, The Church at Pinnacle Hills in Rogers, Arkansas. In 2010, he led the two churches in adopting the unifying name Cross Church. Since that time, Cross Church has added three more locations (Neosho, Rogers, and Fayetteville), with a combined weekly attendance in the thousands. Additionally, Floyd maintains a blog, podcast, and television ministry. Floyd is also the founder of the Cross Church School of Ministry, a one-year residential ministry school that prepares students for life, ministry, and global evangelism. Floyd is the founder and host of the Summit, a weekly lunch seminar for Northwest Arkansas businesspersons which hosts renowned guest speakers.

In 2017, Cross Church opened Hope for the city, which feeds the homeless, ministers to those in need, and advances a ministry to children in the immediate region of its location in Fayetteville.

=== SBC leadership ===
Floyd became chairman of the SBC Executive Committee (1995–1997) and president of the SBC Pastors Conference (1997). He led the SBC's Great Commission Resurgence Task Force (GCRTF) to generate its 2010 report resulting in "dramatic efforts to penetrate lostness in America and across the globe."

In 2013 he began to lead, along with other pastors, a national Call to Pray initiative. Hundreds of Southern Baptist pastors attended Call to Pray events, all for the purpose of praying for spiritual awakening in our churches and revival in our nation.

On June 10, 2014, Floyd was elected president of the Southern Baptist Convention at the SBC's annual gathering held in Baltimore. Upon close of the meeting, he became the 61st president of the SBC, succeeding the Rev. Fred Luter. Floyd served as SBC President until June 15, 2016 when Dr. Steve Gaines was elected.

In April, 2019, Floyd was elected President and CEO of the Southern Baptist Convention's Executive Committee. On April 7, he announced his resignation as Senior Pastor of Cross Church, so as to devote full time to the SBC EC position.

=== Management of third-party sexual abuse allegations ===
In October, 2019, at a conference regarding care for those who have been sexually abused in Christian contexts, Rachael Denhollander referenced abusive treatment of a sexual abuse victim by Floyd and other leaders at the Executive Committee as an example of why those who are abused are reticent to report.

Subsequently, in May, 2021, multiple internal whistleblower reports alleged Floyd had actively sought to intimidate victims, advocates, and stall progress in the sexual abuse inquiry within the Southern Baptist Convention. Floyd issued a statement denying the allegations reported in the leaked letters and stating he had always supported sexual abuse survivors.

In an unprecedented move following weeks of turmoil over allegations of Floyd's handling of the sexual abuse crisis in the Southern Baptist Convention, the delegates to the Southern Baptist Convention voted to mandate an independent third party investigation into the Executive Committee's handling of sexual abuse cases, victims, and advocates, including an investigation into Floyd's actions.

Floyd's leadership was marked by yet another unprecedented milestone for the Southern Baptist Convention when he and the Executive Committee trustees failed to fully comply with the directive of the Convention's delegates when, amidst calls for his removal and a tumultuous trustee meeting, Floyd's resistance to complete transparency and participation in the commissioned abuse task force was supported by the Executive Committee trustees.

=== Political involvement ===
In June 2016, Floyd was tapped by then-candidate Donald Trump to serve on an advisory board of evangelical leaders. Floyd had previously announced that he would not endorse Trump for President and had concerns about some of the candidate's comments, but he believed there was "too much at stake" to refrain from voting or to turn down the opportunity to attempt to influence a possible future president.

== Bibliography ==
- Ronnie Floyd (1983). Implementing a theology of stewardship that will build a biblical attitude of giving in the local Southern Baptist church. Southwestern Baptist Theological Seminary.
- Ronnie Floyd (1988). Coping with life in a confused world. Spirit Publications.
- Ronnie Floyd (1993). Reconnecting: How to Renew and Preserve the 3 Vital Elements of a Powerful Spiritual Life. Broadman & Holman. ISBN 0-8054-6088-8.
- Ronnie Floyd (1994). Choices: Making Sure Your Everyday Decisions Move You Closer to God. Broadman & Holman. ISBN 0-8054-6152-3.
- Ronnie Floyd (1996). God's Gateway to Supernatural Power. B&H Publishing Group. ISBN 0-8054-9296-8.
- Ronnie Floyd (1997). The Meaning of a Man: Discovering Your Destiny as a Spiritual Champion. B&H Publishing Group. ISBN 0-8054-6348-8.
- Ronnie Floyd (1999). How to Pray. Thomas Nelson Inc. ISBN 0-8499-3746-9.
- Ronnie Floyd (2000). Life on fire: radical disciplines for ordinary living. Thomas Nelson Incorporated. ISBN 0-8499-3748-5.
- Ronnie Floyd (2004). Family Life Illustrated For Teens. New Leaf Publishing Group. ISBN 0-89221-586-0.
- Ronnie Floyd (2004). Family Life Illustrated For Women. New Leaf Publishing Group. ISBN 0-89221-583-6.
- Ronnie Floyd (2004). Family Life Illustrated For Men. New Leaf Publishing Group. ISBN 0-89221-584-4.
- Ronnie Floyd (2004). Family Life Illustrated For Finances. New Leaf Publishing Group. ISBN 0-89221-587-9.
- Ronnie Floyd (2004). Family Life Illustrated For Parents. New Leaf Publishing Group. ISBN 0-89221-588-7.
- Ronnie Floyd (2004). Family Life Illustrated for Marriage. New Leaf Publishing Group. ISBN 0-89221-585-2.
- Ronnie Floyd (2004). The Gay Agenda. New Leaf Publishing Group. ISBN 0-89221-582-8.
- Ronnie Floyd (2005). Family Life Illustrated Study Guide. New Leaf Pr. ISBN 0-89221-599-2.
- Ronnie Floyd, Ronnie Floyd (2005). Finding the Favor of God: A Discovery That Will Change Your Life. New Leaf Publishing Group. ISBN 0-89221-619-0.
- Ronnie Floyd (2006). 10 Things Every Minister Needs to Know. New Leaf Publishing Group. ISBN 0-89221-655-7.
- Ronnie Floyd, Bill Bright (2010). The Power of Prayer and Fasting: God's Gateway to Spiritual Breakthroughs (revised & expanded from 1997 ed.). B&H Publishing Group. ISBN 978-0-8054-6483-2.
- Ronnie Floyd (2011). Our Last Great Hope: Awakening the Great Commission. Thomas Nelson. ISBN 978-0-8499-4707-0.

== See also ==
- List of Southern Baptist Convention affiliated people
- Southern Baptist Convention
- Southern Baptist Convention Presidents

Preceded by Fred Luter	President of the Southern Baptist Convention; 2014–2016	Succeeded by Steve Gaines
