= Franklin Avenue Baptist Church =

- Location: New Orleans, Louisiana
- Country: United States
- Denomination: Baptist
- Website: franklinabc.com

History
- Founded: 1940

Administration
- Division: Louisiana Baptist Convention

Franklin Avenue Baptist Church is a Baptist multi-site megachurch based in New Orleans, Louisiana. It is affiliated with the Southern Baptist Convention. Its senior pastor is Fred Luter.

== History ==
The church was founded in New Orleans in 1940. In 1986, Fred Luter became senior pastor of the church, which had 65 members. In 1997, it dedicated a new building including a 2,000-seat auditorium. In 2005, when the church had 7,000 members, Hurricane Katrina flooded its facilities and many members left town. In 2006, it opened campuses in Baton Rouge and Houston. In 2008, the church reopened its renovated facilities on Franklin Avenue. In 2018, it had 6,000 members and made the dedication of a new building including a 3,500-seat auditorium.

== See also ==
- List of the largest evangelical churches
- List of the largest evangelical church auditoriums
