= Southern Baptist Convention =

Christian denomination

- Abbreviation: SBC; GCB
- Classification: Protestant
- Orientation: Baptist
- Scripture: Protestant Bible
- Theology: Evangelical Baptist
- Polity: Congregational
- President: Willy Rice
- Region: United States
- Origin: May 8–12, 1845; Augusta, Georgia, U.S.
- Separated from: Triennial Convention (1845)
- Separations: Missionary Baptists; Alliance of Baptists; Cooperative Baptist Fellowship
- Congregations: 46,608 (2025)
- Members: 12,331,954 (2025)
- Missionary organization: International Mission Board, North American Mission Board
- Aid organization: Send Relief
- Other name: Great Commission Baptists
- Official website: sbc.net

The Southern Baptist Convention (SBC), alternatively the Great Commission Baptists (GCB), is a Christian denomination based in the United States. It is the world's largest Baptist organization, the largest Protestant, and the second-largest Christian body in the United States. The SBC is a cooperation of fully autonomous, independent churches with commonly held essential beliefs that pool some resources for missions.

Churches affiliated with the denomination are evangelical in doctrine and practice, emphasizing the significance of the individual conversion experience. This conversion is then affirmed by the person being completely immersed in water for a believer's baptism. Baptism is believed to be separate from salvation and is a public and symbolic expression of faith, burial of previous life, and resurrection to new life; it is not a requirement for salvation. The denomination has a male pastorate, often citing 1 Timothy 2:12 as the reason it does not ordain women. All affiliated churches deny the legitimacy of same-sex marriage, saying that marriage can only be between a man and a woman, and also that all sexual relations should occur only within the confines of marriage. Other specific beliefs based on biblical interpretation vary by congregational polity, often to balance local church autonomy.

In 1845, the Southern Baptists separated from the Triennial Convention to uphold the institution of slavery, as American society divided over slavery preceding the American Civil War. In 1995, the denomination apologized for racial positions in its history, and at present, the Southern Baptist Convention is racially diverse, with one in four congregations having a nonwhite majority. Since the 1940s, it has spread across the United States, with tens of thousands of affiliated churches and 41 affiliated state conventions. Beginning in the late 1970s, a conservative movement began to take control of the organization, and it succeeded in taking control of the SBC leadership by the 1990s.

Self-reported membership peaked in 2006 at roughly 16 million. Membership has contracted by an estimated 13.6% since that year, with 2020 marking the 14th year of continuous decline. Mean organization-wide weekly attendance dropped about 27% between 2006 and 2020. The Convention reported increased participation and a slowing of the rate of overall membership decline in 2025, with 12,331,954 members reported.

== Name ==
The official name is the Southern Baptist Convention. The word Southern in "Southern Baptist Convention" stems from its 1845 organization in Augusta, Georgia, by white Baptists in the Southern United States who supported continuing the institution of slavery and split from the northern Baptists (known today as the American Baptist Churches USA), who did not support funding evangelists engaging in slavery in the Southern United States.

In 2012, the organization adopted the descriptor Great Commission Baptists after the election of its first African American president. Additionally, in 2020, some leaders of the Southern Baptists wanted to change its name to "Great Commission Baptists" to distance itself from its white supremacist foundation, and because it is no longer a specifically Southern church. Several churches affiliated with the denomination have also begun to identify as "Great Commission Baptists".

== History ==
=== Colonial era ===
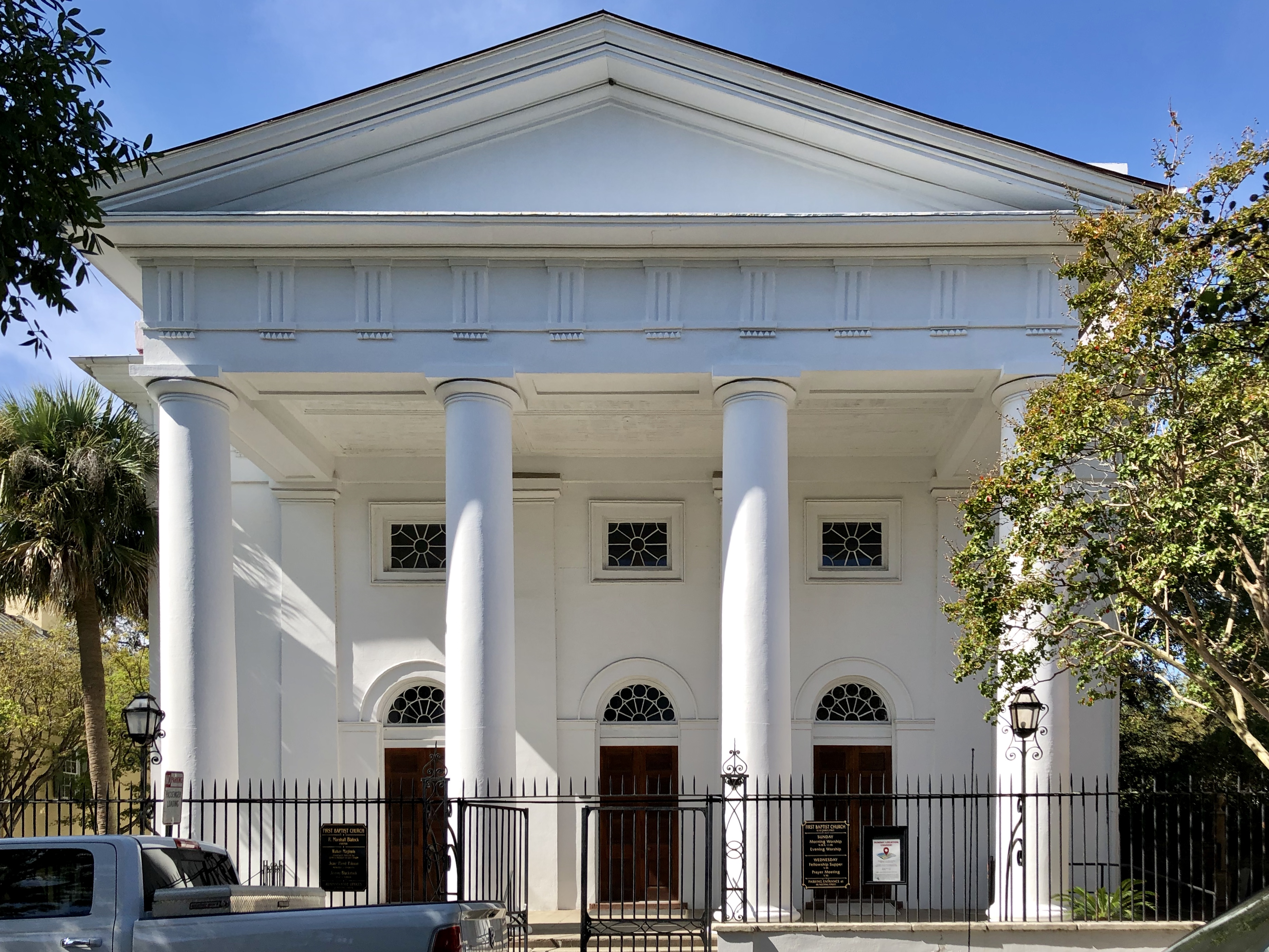
First Baptist Church in Charleston, South Carolina

Most early Baptists in the British colonies came from England in the 17th century, after conflict with the Church of England for their dissenting religious views. In 1638, Roger Williams founded the first Baptist church in British America at the Providence Plantations, the first permanent European American settlement also founded by Williams in Rhode Island. The oldest Baptist church in the South, First Baptist Church of Charleston, South Carolina, was organized in 1682 under the leadership of William Screven. A Baptist church was formed in Virginia in 1715 through the preaching of Robert Norden and another in North Carolina in 1727 through the ministry of Paul Palmer.

The Baptists adhered to a congregationalist polity. They operated independently of the state-established Anglican churches in the Southern United States at a time when states prohibited non-Anglicans from holding political office. By 1740, about eight Baptist churches existed in the colonies of Virginia, North Carolina, and South Carolina, with an estimated 300 to 400 members. New members, both black and white, were converted chiefly by Baptist preachers who traveled throughout the Southern United States during the 18th and 19th centuries, in the eras of the First and Second Great Awakenings.

Black churches were founded in Virginia, South Carolina, and Georgia before the American Revolution. Some black congregations kept their independence even after whites tried to exercise more authority after Nat Turner's Rebellion of 1831.

=== American Revolution period ===
Before the American Revolution, Baptist and Methodist evangelicals in the Southern United States promoted the view of the common person's equality before God, which embraced enslaved people and free blacks. They challenged the hierarchies of class and race and urged planters to abolish slavery. They welcomed enslaved people as Baptists and accepted them as preachers.

During this time, there was a sharp division between the austerity of the plain-living Baptists, attracted initially from yeomen and common planters, and the opulence of the Anglican planters—the enslaving elite who controlled local and colonial government in what had become an enslaved society by the late 18th century. The gentry interpreted Baptist church discipline as political radicalism, but it served to ameliorate disorder. The Baptists intensely monitored each other's moral conduct, watching especially for sexual transgressions, cursing, and excessive drinking; they expelled members who would not reform.

In Virginia and most southern colonies before the American Revolution, the Church of England was the established church and supported by general taxes, as it was in England. It opposed the rapid spread of Baptists in the Southern United States. Particularly, Virginia prosecuted many Baptist preachers for "disturbing the peace" by preaching without licenses from the Anglican Church. Patrick Henry and James Madison defended Baptist preachers before the American Revolution in cases considered significant in the history of religious freedom. In 1779, Thomas Jefferson wrote the Virginia Statute for Religious Freedom, enacted in 1786 by the Virginia General Assembly. Madison later applied his ideas and those of the Virginia document related to religious freedom during the Constitutional Convention, when he ensured that delegates incorporated them into the United States Constitution.

The struggle for religious tolerance erupted during the American Revolution, as the Baptists worked to disestablish the Anglican churches in the South. The Baptists protested vigorously; the resulting social disorder resulted chiefly from the ruling gentry's disregard for public needs. The vitality of the religious opposition made the conflict between "evangelical" and "gentry" styles bitter. Scholarship suggests that the evangelical movement's strength determined its ability to mobilize power outside the conventional authority structure.

=== National unification and regional division ===
In 1814, leaders such as Luther Rice helped Baptists unify nationally under what became known informally as the Triennial Convention (because it met every three years) based in Philadelphia. It allowed them to join their resources to support missions abroad. The Home Mission Society, affiliated with the Triennial Convention, was established in 1832 to support missions in U.S. frontier territories. By the mid-19th century, there were many social, cultural, economic, and political differences among business owners of the North, farmers of the West, and planters of the South. The most divisive conflict was primarily over the issue of slavery and, secondarily, over missions.

==== Divisions over slavery ====
The issues surrounding slavery dominated the 19th century in the United States. This created tension between Baptists in northern and southern U.S. states over the issue of manumission. In the two decades after the American Revolution during the Second Great Awakening, northern Baptist preachers, as well as the Quakers and Methodists, increasingly argued that enslavers must free the people they enslaved. Although most Baptists in the 19th century south were yeomen farmers and common planters, the Baptists also began to attract major planters among their membership. Many southern ministers interpreted the Bible as supporting slavery and encouraged paternalistic practices by enslavers. They preached to enslaved people to accept their places and obey their enslavers and welcomed enslaved people and free blacks as members; whites controlled the churches' leadership and usually segregated church seating. From the early 19th century, many Baptist preachers in the Southern United States also argued in favor of preserving the right of ministers to be enslavers.

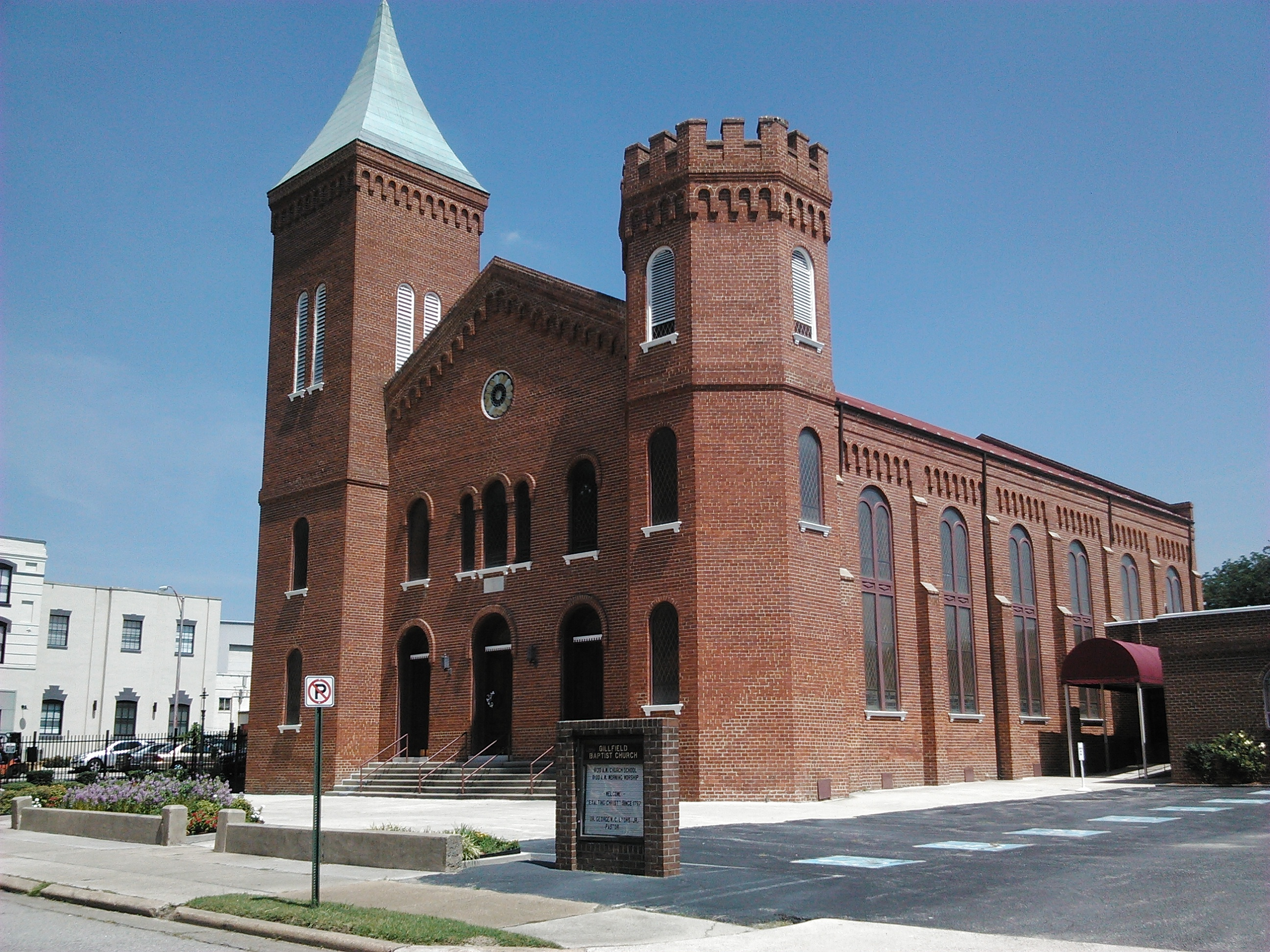
Gillfield Baptist Church was the most prominent Black American congregation within the Portsmouth Association of the Triennial Convention, preceding the establishment of the Southern Baptist Convention.

Black congregations were sometimes the largest in their regions. For instance, by 1821, Gillfield Baptist in Petersburg, Virginia, had the largest congregation within the Portsmouth Association. At 441 members, it was more than twice as large as the next-biggest church. Before Nat Turner's Rebellion of 1831, Gillfield had a black preacher. Afterward, the state legislature insisted that white men oversee black congregations. Gillfield could not call a black preacher until after the American Civil War and emancipation. After Turner's rebellion, whites worked to exert more control over black congregations and passed laws requiring white ministers to lead or be present at religious meetings. Many enslaved people evaded these restrictions.

The Triennial Convention and the Home Mission Society adopted a kind of neutrality concerning slavery, neither condoning nor condemning it. During the "Georgia Test Case" of 1844, the Georgia State Convention proposed the appointment of the enslaver Elder James E. Reeve as a missionary. The Foreign Mission Board refused to approve his appointment, recognizing the case as a challenge and not wanting to violate their neutrality on slavery. They said that slavery should not be a factor in deliberations about missionary appointments.

In 1844, University of Alabama president Basil Manly Sr., a prominent preacher and major planter who enslaved 40 people, drafted the "Alabama Resolutions" and presented them to the Triennial Convention. They included the demand that enslavers be eligible for denominational offices to which the Southern associations contributed financially. They were not adopted. Many Baptists in Georgia decided to test the claimed neutrality by recommending an enslaver to the Home Mission Society as a missionary. The Home Mission Society's board refused to appoint him, noting that missionaries were not allowed to take servants with them (so he clearly could not enslave people) and that they would not make a decision that appeared to endorse slavery. Many southern Baptists considered this an infringement of their right to determine candidates. From the perspective of many southerners, the northern position that "slaveholding brethren were less than followers of Jesus" effectively obligated enslavers to secede from the Triennial Convention. This difference came to a head in 1845 when representatives of the northern states refused to appoint missionaries whose families enslaved people. To continue in the work of missions, many southern Baptists separated and founded the Southern Baptist Convention.

==== Missions and organization ====
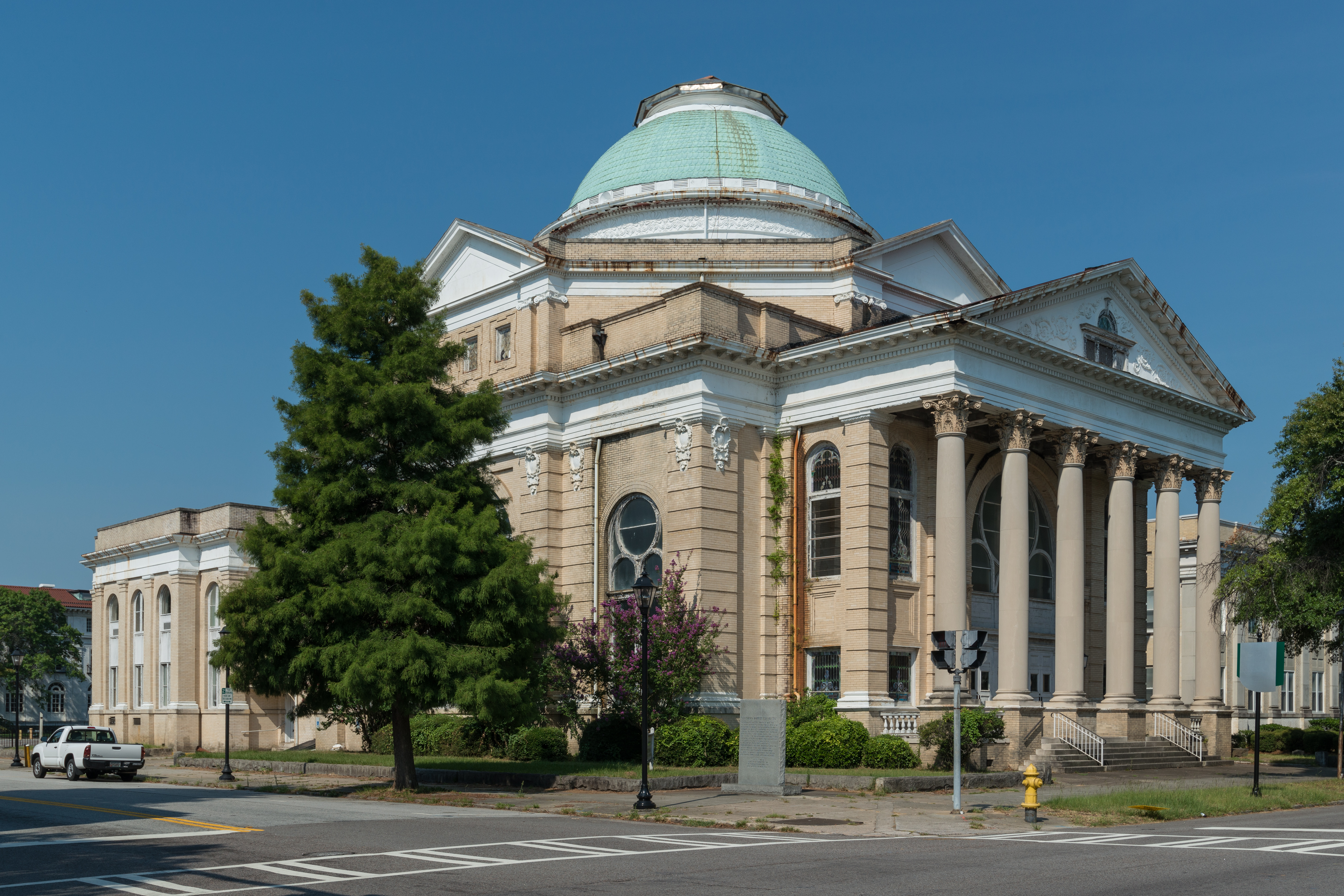
Original location of First Baptist Church in Augusta, Georgia

A secondary issue that disturbed the Southerners was the perception that the American Baptist Home Mission Society did not appoint a proportionate number of missionaries to the South. This was likely a result of the society's not appointing enslavers as missionaries. Baptists in the North preferred a loosely structured society of individuals who paid annual dues, with each society usually focused on a single ministry.

Baptists in Southern churches preferred a more centralized organization of churches patterned after their associations, with a variety of ministries brought under the direction of one denominational organization. The increasing tensions and the discontent of Baptists from the Southern United States over national criticism of slavery and issues over missions led to their withdrawal from national Baptist organizations.

The Southern Baptists met at the First Baptist Church of Augusta in May 1845. At this meeting, they created a new convention—the Southern Baptist Convention. They elected William Bullein Johnson (1782–1862) as its first president. He had served as president of the Triennial Convention in 1841, though he initially attempted to avoid a schism.

=== Formation and separation of black Baptists ===
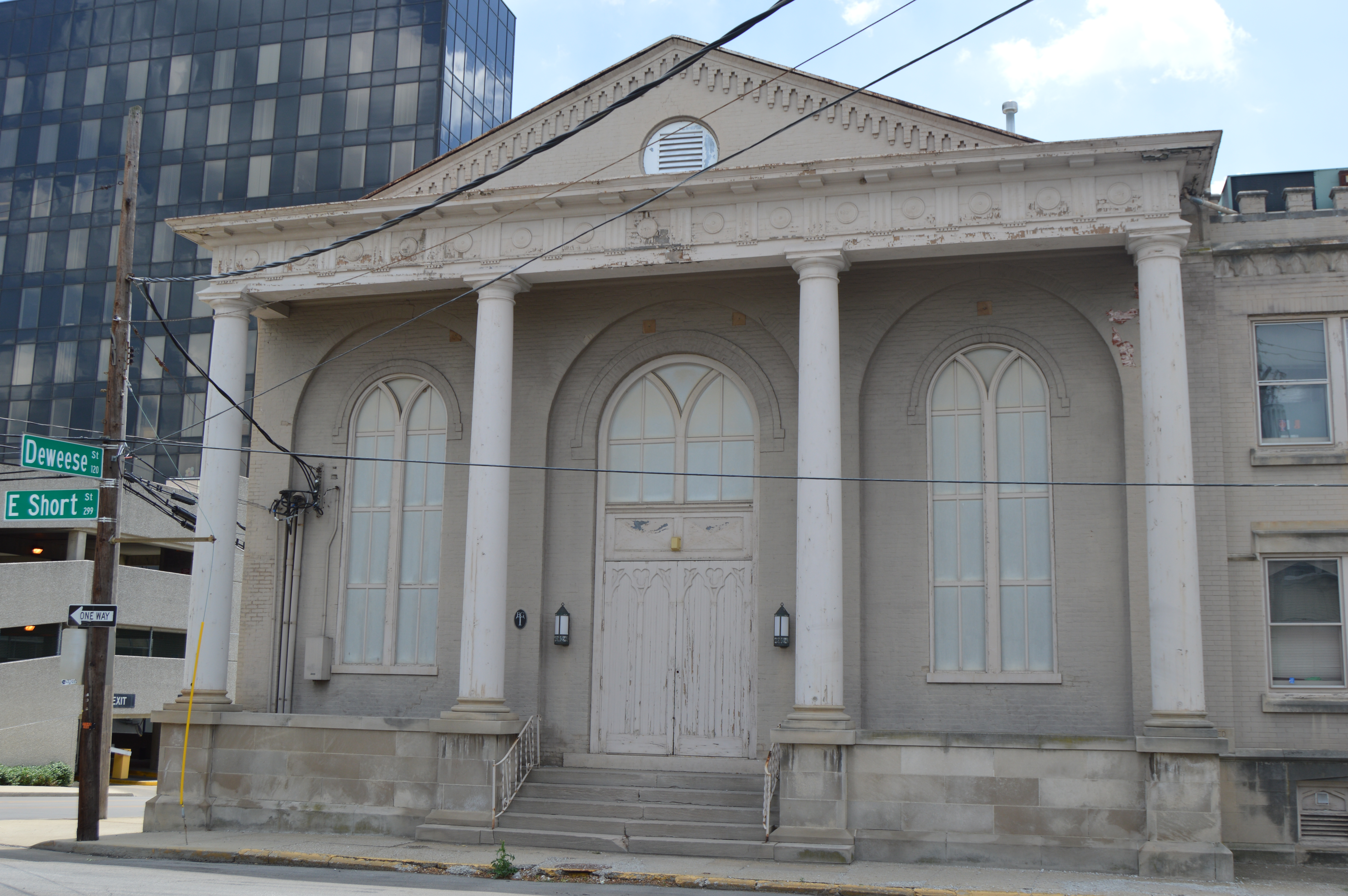
First African Baptist Church in Lexington, Kentucky

African Americans had gathered in their own churches early on, in 1774 in Petersburg, Virginia, and in Savannah, Georgia, in 1788. Some established churches after 1800 on the frontier, such as the First African Baptist Church of Lexington, Kentucky. In 1824, the Elkhorn Association of Kentucky, which was white-dominated, accepted it. By 1850, First African had 1,820 members, the largest of any Baptist church in the state, black or white. In 1861, it had 2,223 members.

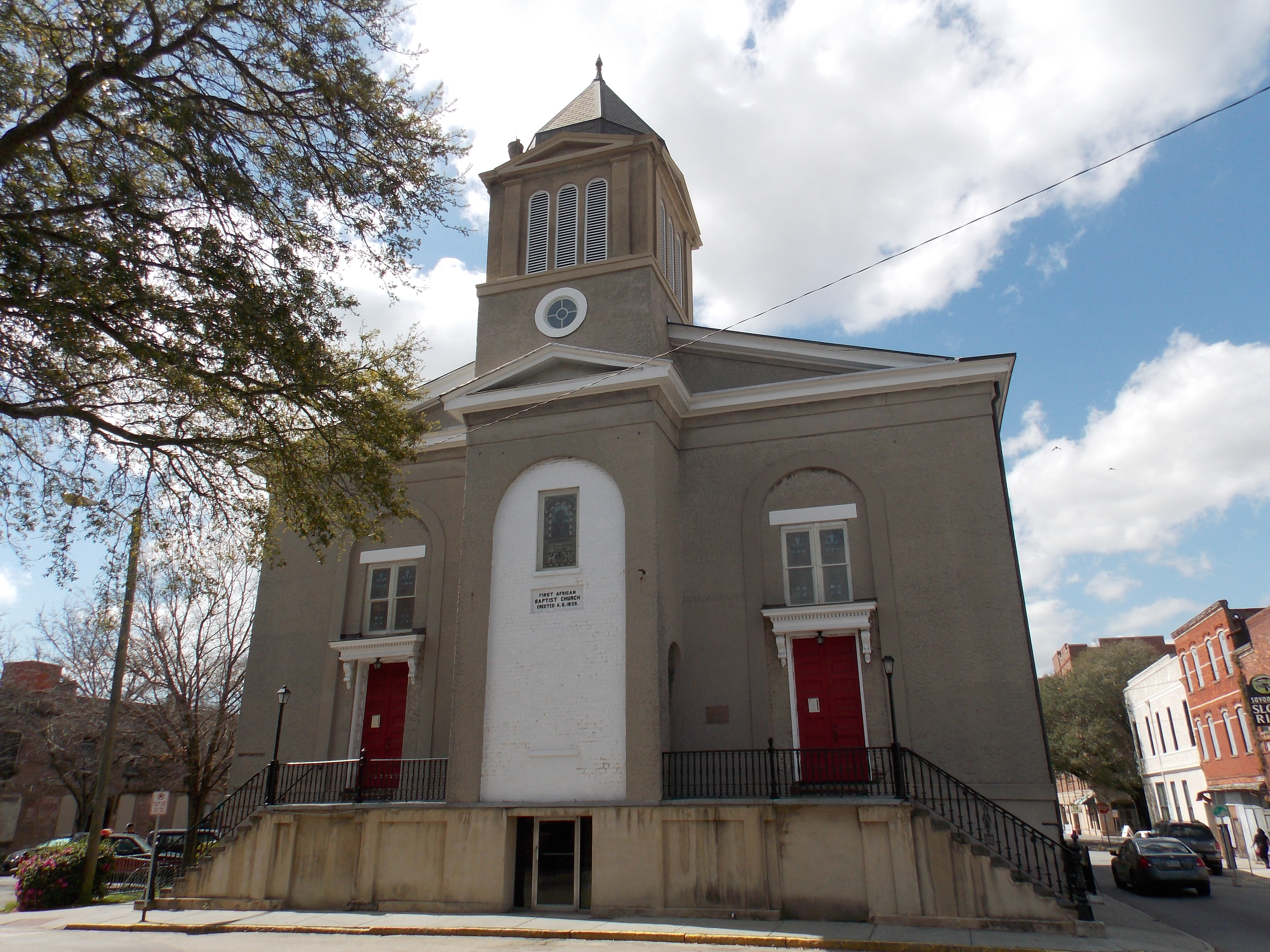
First African Baptist Church, Savannah, Georgia, constructed 1856

Southern whites generally required black churches to have white ministers and trustees. In churches with mixed congregations, seating was segregated, with blacks out of sight, often in a balcony. White preaching often emphasized Biblical stipulations that enslaved people should accept their places and try to behave well toward their enslavers. After the American Civil War, another split occurred when most freedmen set up independent black congregations, regional associations, and state and national conventions. Black people wanted to practice Christianity independently of white supervision. They interpreted the Bible as offering hope for deliverance and saw their exodus out of enslavement as comparable to the Exodus, with abolitionist John Brown as their Moses. They quickly left white-dominated churches and associations and set up separate state Baptist conventions. In 1866, black Baptists of the Southern and Western United States combined to form the Consolidated American Baptist Convention. In 1895, they merged three national conventions to create the National Baptist Convention, USA. With more than eight million members, it is today the largest African American religious organization and second in size to the Southern Baptists.

Free black people in the North founded churches and denominations in the early 19th century independent of white-dominated organizations. In the Reconstruction era, missionaries, both black and white, from several northern denominations worked in the South; they quickly attracted tens and hundreds of thousands of new members from among the millions of freedmen. The African Methodist Episcopal Church attracted more new members than any other denomination. White Southern Baptist churches lost black members to the new denominations, as well as to independent congregations which freedmen organized.

During the civil rights movement, many Southern Baptist pastors and members of their congregations rejected racial integration and accepted white supremacy, further alienating African Americans. According to historian and former Southern Baptist Wayne Flynt, "The [Southern Baptist] church was the last bastion of segregation." SBC did not integrate seminary classrooms until 1951.

In 1995, the convention voted to adopt a resolution in which it renounced its racist roots and apologized for its past defense of slavery, segregation, and white supremacy. This marked the denomination's first formal acknowledgment that racism had played a profound role in both its early and modern history.

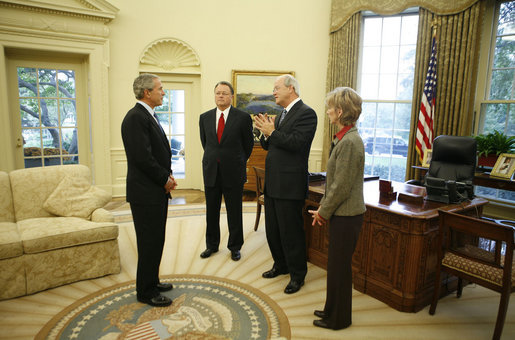
U.S. President George W. Bush meets with the leadership of the Southern Baptist Convention in 2006 in the Oval Office at the White House. Pictured with the President are Morris Chapman, left, Frank Page and his wife Dayle Page.

=== Increasing diversity and policy changes ===
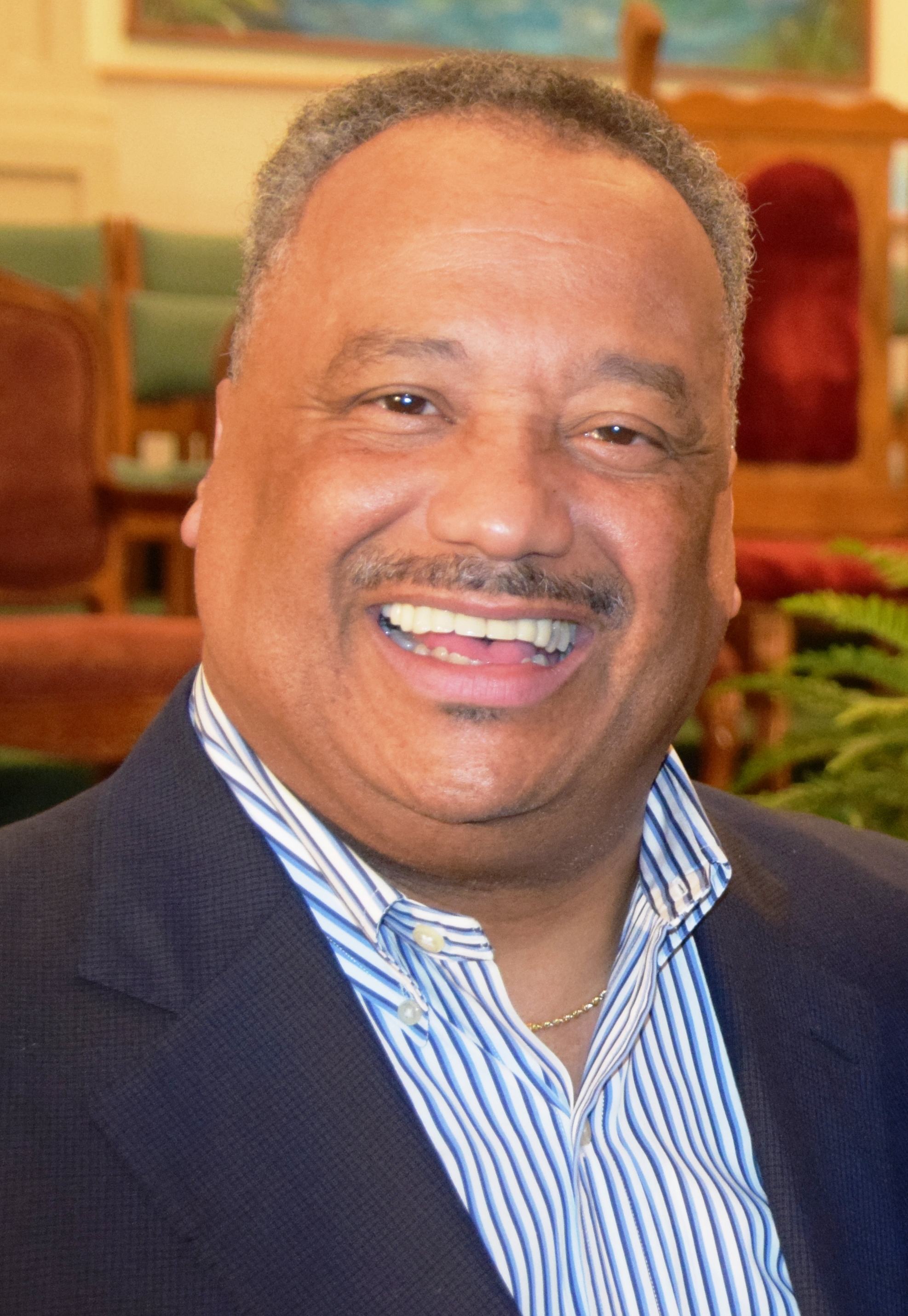
Fred Luter Jr. was the first African American president of the Southern Baptists.

By the early 21st century, the number of ethnically diverse congregations was increasing among the Southern Baptists. In 2008, almost 20% of the congregations were majority African American, Asian, Hispanic, or Latino. SBC cooperating churches had an estimated one million African American members. It has passed a series of resolutions recommending including more black members and appointing more African American leaders. At its 2012 annual meeting, it elected Pastor Fred Luter of the Franklin Avenue Baptist Church as its first African American president. He had earned respect by showing leadership skills in building a large congregation in New Orleans.

The SBC's increasingly national scope inspired some members to suggest a name change. In 2005, some members made proposals at the SBC Annual Meeting to change the name to the more national-sounding "North American Baptist Convention" or "Scriptural Baptist Convention" (to retain the SBC initials). These proposals were defeated.

The messengers of the 2012 annual meeting in New Orleans voted to adopt the descriptor "Great Commission Baptists". The legal name remained "Southern Baptist Convention", but affiliated churches and convention entities could voluntarily use the descriptor.

Almost a year after the Charleston church shooting, the denomination approved a resolution that called upon member churches and families to stop flying the Confederate flag.

The church approved a resolution, "On Refugee Ministry", encouraging member churches and families to welcome refugees coming to the United States. In the same convention, Russell Moore of the Southern Baptist Ethics and Religious Liberty Commission quickly responded to a pastor who asked why a member should support the right of Muslims living in the U.S. to build mosques. Moore replied, "Sometimes we have to deal with questions that are really complicated... this isn't one of them." Moore said that religious freedom must be for all religions.

From February to June 2016, the denomination collaborated with the National Baptist Convention, USA, on racial reconciliation. SBC-GCB and NBC presidents Ronnie Floyd and Jerry Young assembled ten pastors from each convention in 2015, discussing race relations; in 2016, Baptist Press and The New York Times revealed tension among National Baptists debating any collaboration with Southern Baptists, quoting NBC President Young:

I've never said this to Dr. Floyd, but I've had fellows in my own denomination who called me and said: "What are you doing? I mean, are you not aware of the history?" And I say, obviously I'm aware. They bring up the issue about slavery and that becomes a reason, they say, that we ought not to be involved with the Southern Baptists. Where from my vantage point, that's reverse racism. I do understand the history, and I understand the pain of the past...But what I'm also quite clear about is, if the Gospel does anything at all, the Gospel demands that we not only preach but practice reconciliation.

— Dr. Jerry Young, NBC USA

After an initial resolution denouncing the alt-right movement failed to make it to the convention floor, the denomination officially denounced the alt-right movement at the 2017 convention. On November 5, 2017, a mass shooting took place at the First Baptist Church of Sutherland Springs. It was the deadliest shooting to occur at any affiliated church in its history and, in modern history, at an American place of worship.

In 2020, the denomination canceled its convention due to COVID-19 concerns and eventually rescheduled for June 2021.

In a Washington Post story dated September 15, 2020, Greear said some Southern Baptist Convention leaders wanted to change the official name of the church to "Great Commission Baptists" (GCB), to distance the church from its support of slavery and because it is no longer just a Southern church. Since then, several leaders and churches have begun adopting the alternative descriptor for their churches.

=== Sexual abuse scandal ===
In 2018, investigations showed that the SBC suppressed reports of sexual abuse and protected over 700 accused ministers and church workers. In 2022, a report indicated church leaders had stonewalled and disparaged clergy sex abuse survivors for nearly two decades; reform efforts had been met with criticism or dismissal from other organization leaders; and known abusers had been allowed to keep their positions without informing their local churches. On August 12, 2022, the denomination announced that it was facing a federal investigation into the scandal.

On February 10, 2019, a joint investigation by the Houston Chronicle and the San Antonio Express found that there had been over 700 victims of sexual abuse by nearly 400 Southern Baptist church leaders, pastors, and volunteers over the previous 20 years.

In 2018, the Houston Chronicle verified details of hundreds of accounts of abuse. It examined federal and state court databases, prison records, and official documents from more than 20 states and researched sex offender registries nationwide. The Chronicle compiled a list of records and information (current as of June 2019) listing church pastors, leaders, employees, and volunteers who have pleaded guilty to or were convicted of sex crimes.

On June 12, 2019, during their annual meeting, convention messengers, who assembled that year in Birmingham, Alabama, approved a resolution condemning sex abuse and establishing a special committee to investigate sex abuse, which will make it easier for the convention to excommunicate churches. The Reverend J. D. Greear, president of the convention and pastor of The Summit Church in Durham, North Carolina, called the move a "defining moment". Ronnie Floyd, president of the convention's executive committee, echoed Greear's remarks, calling the vote "a very, very significant moment in the history of the Southern Baptist Convention".

In June 2021, letters from former policy director Russell D. Moore to convention leadership were leaked. In the letters, Moore described how the convention had mishandled claims of sexual abuse.

On May 22, 2022, Guidepost Solutions, an independent firm contracted by the organization's executive committee, released a report detailing that church leaders had stonewalled and disparaged clergy sex abuse survivors for nearly two decades. It was then the most extensive investigation undertaken in the convention's history, with $4 million reportedly spent by the organization to fund the inquiry. The report also found that known abusers were allowed to keep their positions without informing their church or congregation. The report alleged that while the convention had elected a president, J. D. Greear, in 2018 who made addressing sexual abuse a central part of his agenda, nearly all efforts at reform had been met with criticism and dismissal by other organization leaders.

On June 14, 2022, the denomination voted "to create a way to track pastors and other church workers credibly accused of sex abuse and launch a new task force to oversee further reforms" after a consultant exposed that "Southern Baptist leaders mishandled abuse cases and stonewalled victims for years". The new task force will operate for one year, with the option to continue longer.

On August 12, 2022, the organization announced that it was facing a federal investigation into the sex abuse scandal. As revelations of sexual abuse and lawsuits continued to emerge in 2023, the SBC's Abuse Reform Implementation Task Force announced continued development of the database of sexual offenders.

== Doctrine ==
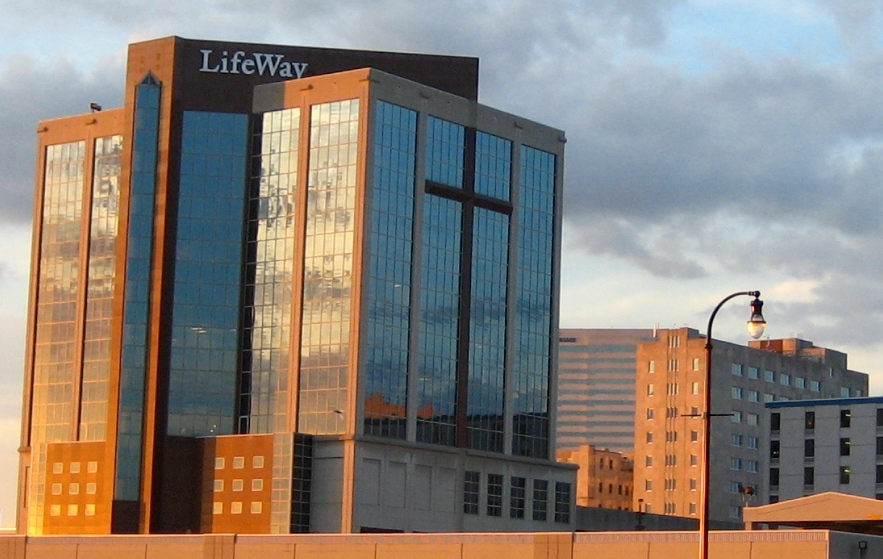
Former Lifeway Christian Resources headquarters in Nashville, Tennessee

The Baptist Faith and Message (BF&M) represents the general theological perspective of the denomination's churches. The convention first drafted the BF&M in 1925 as a revision of the 1833 New Hampshire Confession of Faith. The convention revised the BF&M significantly in 1963, amended it in 1998 to add one new section on the family, and revised it again in 2000. The 1998 and 2000 changes were the subject of much controversy, particularly regarding the role of women in the church.

The BF&M is not a creed, such as the Nicene Creed. Members are not required to adhere to it, and churches and state conventions belonging to the global body are not required to use it as their statement of faith or doctrine, though many do in lieu of creating their own statement. Nevertheless, key leaders, faculty in denomination-owned seminaries, and missionaries who apply to serve through the various missionary agencies must affirm that their practices, doctrine, and preaching are consistent with the BF&M.

In 2012, a LifeWay Research survey of the denomination's pastors found that 30% of churches identified with the labels Calvinist or Reformed, while 30% identified with the labels Arminian or Wesleyan. LifeWay Research President Ed Stetzer said, "historically, many Baptists have considered themselves neither Calvinist nor Arminian, but holding a unique theological approach not framed well by either category". The survey also found that 60% of its pastors were concerned about Calvinism's impact within the convention. Nathan Finn writes that the debate over Calvinism has "periodically reignited with increasing intensity" and that non-Calvinists "seem to be especially concerned with the influence of Founders Ministries" while Calvinists "seem to be particularly concerned with the influence of revivalism and Keswick theology."

Historically, the denomination has not considered glossolalia or other Charismatic beliefs to be in accordance with Scriptural teaching, though the BF&M does not mention the subject. In 2015, the International Mission Board lifted a ban on glossolalia for its missionaries while reaffirming that it should not be taught as normative.

The convention brings together fundamentalist and moderate churches.

=== Position statements ===
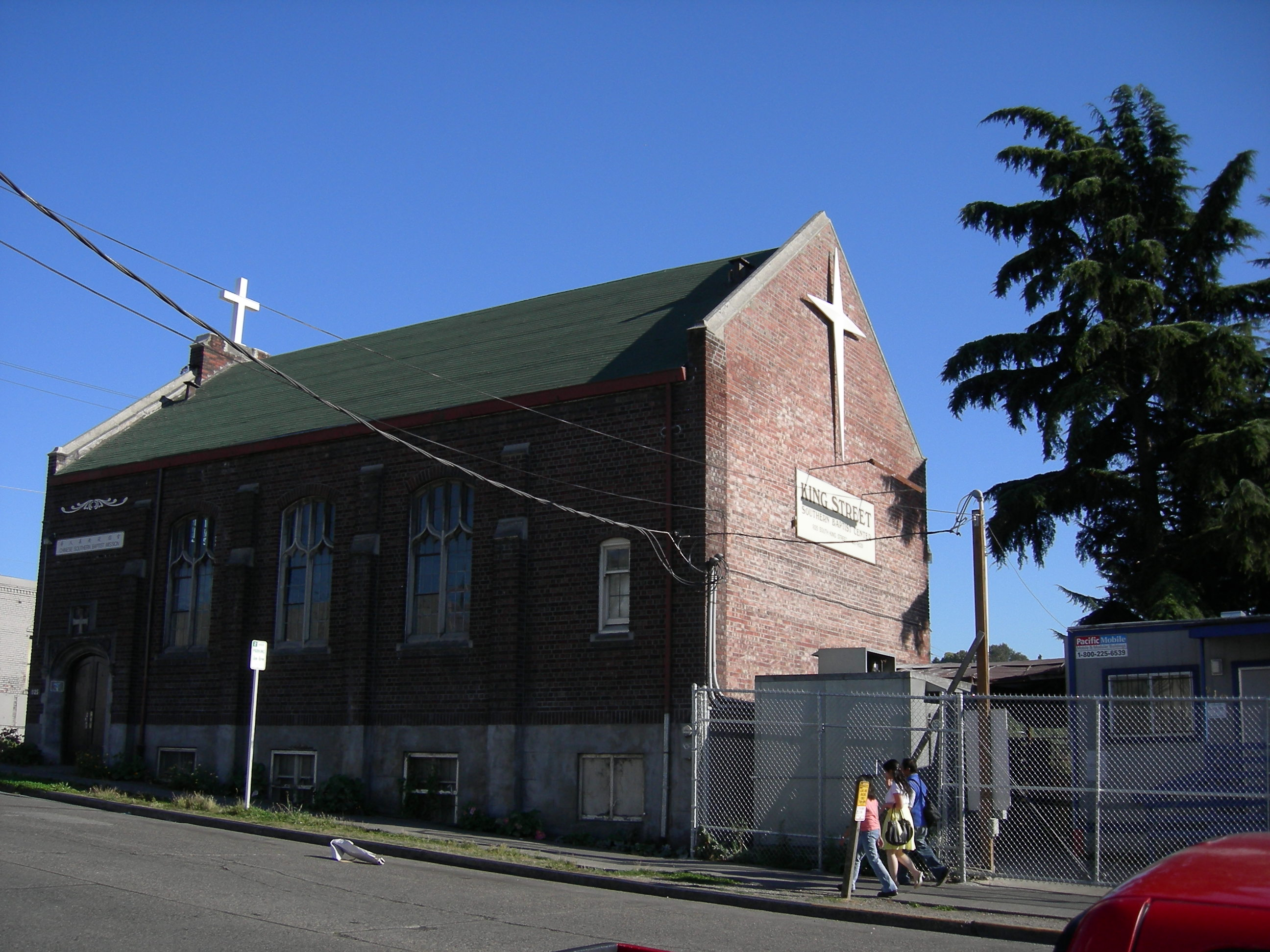
Chinese Southern Baptist Church in Seattle, Washington

In addition to the BF&M, the denomination has also issued position statements affirming the autonomy of the local church; identifying the Cooperative Program of missions as integral to the denomination; that statements of belief are revisable in light of Scripture, though the Bible is the final word; honoring the indigenous principle in missions without compromising doctrine or its identity for missional opportunities; that laypersons have the same right as ordained ministers to communicate with God, interpret Scripture, and minister in Christ's name; that "At the moment of conception, a new being enters the universe, a human being, a being created in God's image", who as such should be protected regardless of the circumstances of the conception; that God's plan for marriage and sexual intimacy is a lifetime relationship of one man and one woman, rejecting homosexuality; understanding the Bible to forbid any form of extramarital sexual relations; affirming the accountability of each person before God; and that women are not eligible to serve as pastors.

In 2022, it passed a resolution against prosperity theology, which it considers a heretical distortion of the message of the Bible.

==== Abortion ====
The position of many Southern Baptists on abortion has changed significantly over time, evolving from acceptance under certain circumstances to firm opposition.

In 1971, the SBC passed a resolution urging a loosening of U.S. abortion laws, stating:

Be it further resolved, that we call upon Southern Baptists to work for legislation that will allow the possibility of abortion under such conditions as rape, incest, clear evidence of severe fetal deformity, and carefully ascertained evidence of the likelihood of damage to the emotional, mental, and physical health of the mother.

In 1973, a "poll conducted by the Baptist Standard news journal found that 90 percent of Texas Baptists believed their state's abortion laws were too restrictive".

During this era, a majority of Southern Baptists, including a few conservatives within the denomination, supported a moderate expansion of abortion rights, seeing it as a matter of religious liberty, what they saw as a lack of biblical condemnation, and belief in non-intrusive government. Southern Baptists' and evangelicals' initial reaction to Roe v. Wade decision was one of support or indifference; they overwhelmingly viewed anti-abortion movements as a sectarian and Catholic concern. By the mid-1970s, this began to change, as a movement that sought to change Southern Baptists' opinions on abortion began to incline them against it substantially. Over that period, the SBC changed in other ways as well. Today, the SBC strongly opposes abortion.

==== Gender-based roles ====
Officially, the denomination subscribes to the complementarian view of gender roles. Beginning in the early 1970s, as a reaction to their perceptions of various "women's liberation movements", the church, along with several other historically conservative Baptist groups, began to assert its view of the propriety and primacy of what it deemed "traditional gender roles" as a body. In 1973, at the annual meeting of the Southern Baptist Convention, delegates passed a resolution that read in part: "Man was not made for woman, but the woman for the man. Woman is the glory of man. Woman would not have existed without man." In 1998, the convention appended a male leadership understanding of marriage to the 1963 version of the Baptist Faith and Message, with an official amendment: Article XVIII, "The Family". In 2000, it revised the document to reflect support for a male-only pastorate with no mention of the office of deacon.

In 1984, when it had about 250 women pastors, the Convention adopted a resolution affirming the exclusion of women from pastoral leadership.

Since 1987, various local associations and regional conventions have considered churches that have authorized the pastoral ministry of women to not be in friendly cooperation (or "disfellowshipped") without the intervention of the national convention on the subject.

By explicitly defining the pastoral office as the exclusive domain of males, the 2000 BF&M provision became the Southern Baptist's first-ever official position against women pastors. As individual churches affiliated with the organization are autonomous, churches cannot be forced to adopt a male-only pastorate.

Some churches that have installed women as their pastors have been disfellowshipped from membership in their local associations; a smaller number have been disfellowshipped from their affiliated state conventions. In February 2023, the Executive Committee for the first time deemed five churches that had appointed women pastors to not be in friendly cooperation. In June 2023, when two churches requested a review of the decision, 88% of the church representatives at the annual convention voted to uphold the decision. American Reformer magazine estimated the convention would have 1,844 female pastors in 2023.

The crystallization of the church's positions on gender roles and restrictions on women's participation in the pastorate contributed to the decision by members now belonging to the Cooperative Baptist Fellowship, which broke from the convention in 1991. Another denomination that broke off, the Alliance of Baptists, also accepts women's ordination.

The 2000 BF&M prescribes a husband-headship authority structure, closely following a complementarian reading of Paul the Apostle's exhortations in Ephesians 5:21–33:

Article XVIII. The Family. The husband and wife are of equal worth before God, since both are created in God's image. The marriage relationship models the way God relates to his people. A husband is to love his wife as Christ loved the church. He has the God-given responsibility to provide for, to protect, and to lead his family. A wife is to submit herself graciously to the servant leadership of her husband even as the church willingly submits to the headship of Christ. She, being in the image of God as is her husband and thus equal to him, has the God-given responsibility to respect her husband and to serve as his helper in managing the household and nurturing the next generation.

=== Ordinances ===
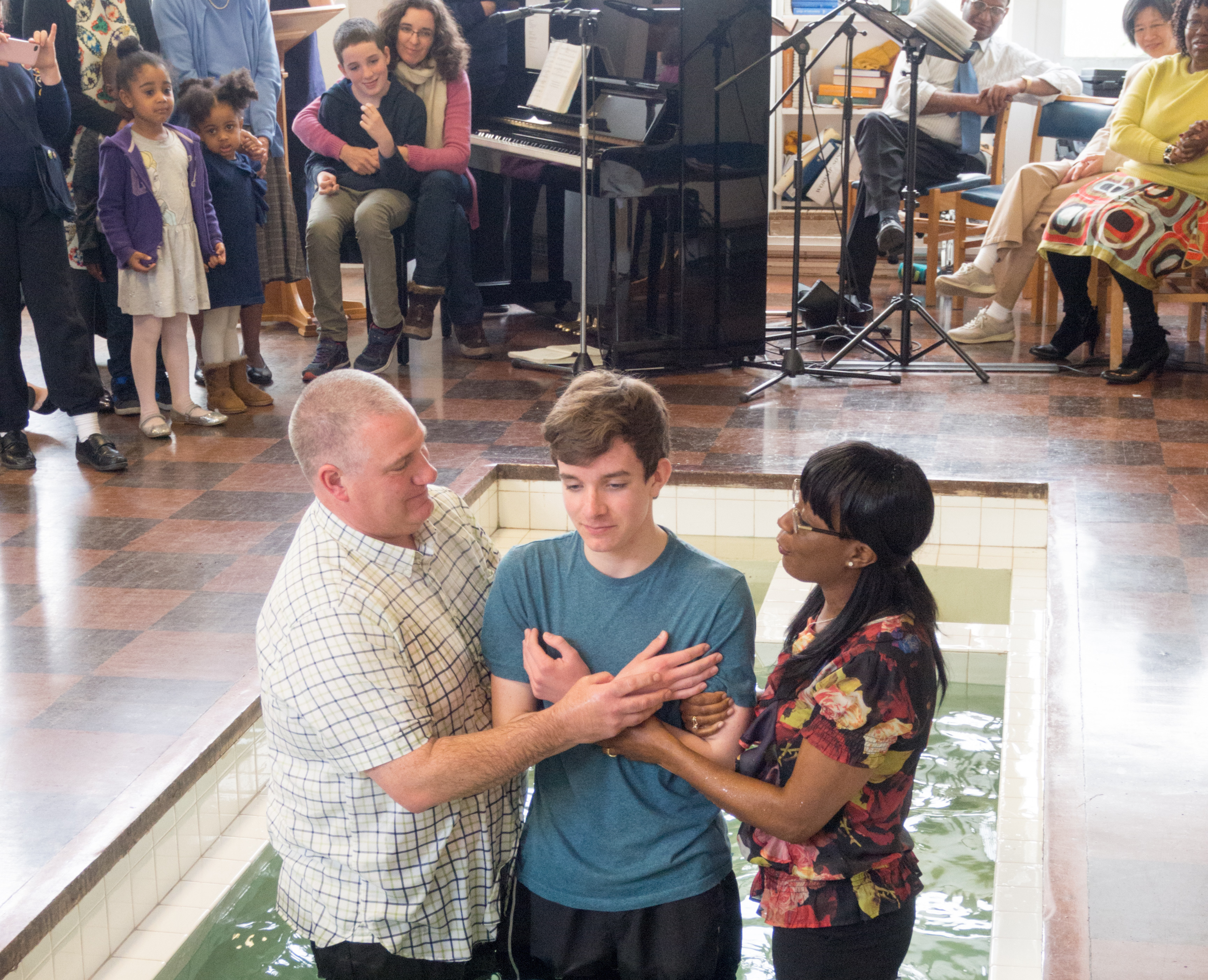
Full-immersion baptism is the accepted mode of baptism among the Southern Baptist Convention.

Southern/Great Commission Baptists observe two ordinances: the Lord's Supper and believer's baptism (also known as credo-baptism, from the Latin for "I believe"). Furthermore, they hold the historic Baptist belief that immersion is the only valid mode of baptism. The Baptist Faith and Message describes baptism as a symbolic act of obedience and a testimony of the believer's faith in Jesus Christ to other people. The BF&M also notes that baptism is a precondition to congregational church membership.

The BF&M holds to memorialism, the belief that the Lord's Supper is a symbolic act of obedience in which believers commemorate the death of Christ and look forward to his Second Coming. Individual churches are free to practice either open or closed communion (due to the convention's belief in congregational polity and the autonomy of the local church), but most practice open communion. For the same reason, the frequency of observance of the Lord's Supper varies from church to church. Churches commonly observe it quarterly, but some churches offer it monthly; a small minority offer it weekly. Because the organization has traditionally opposed alcoholic beverage consumption by members, grape juice is used instead of wine.

=== Worship ===
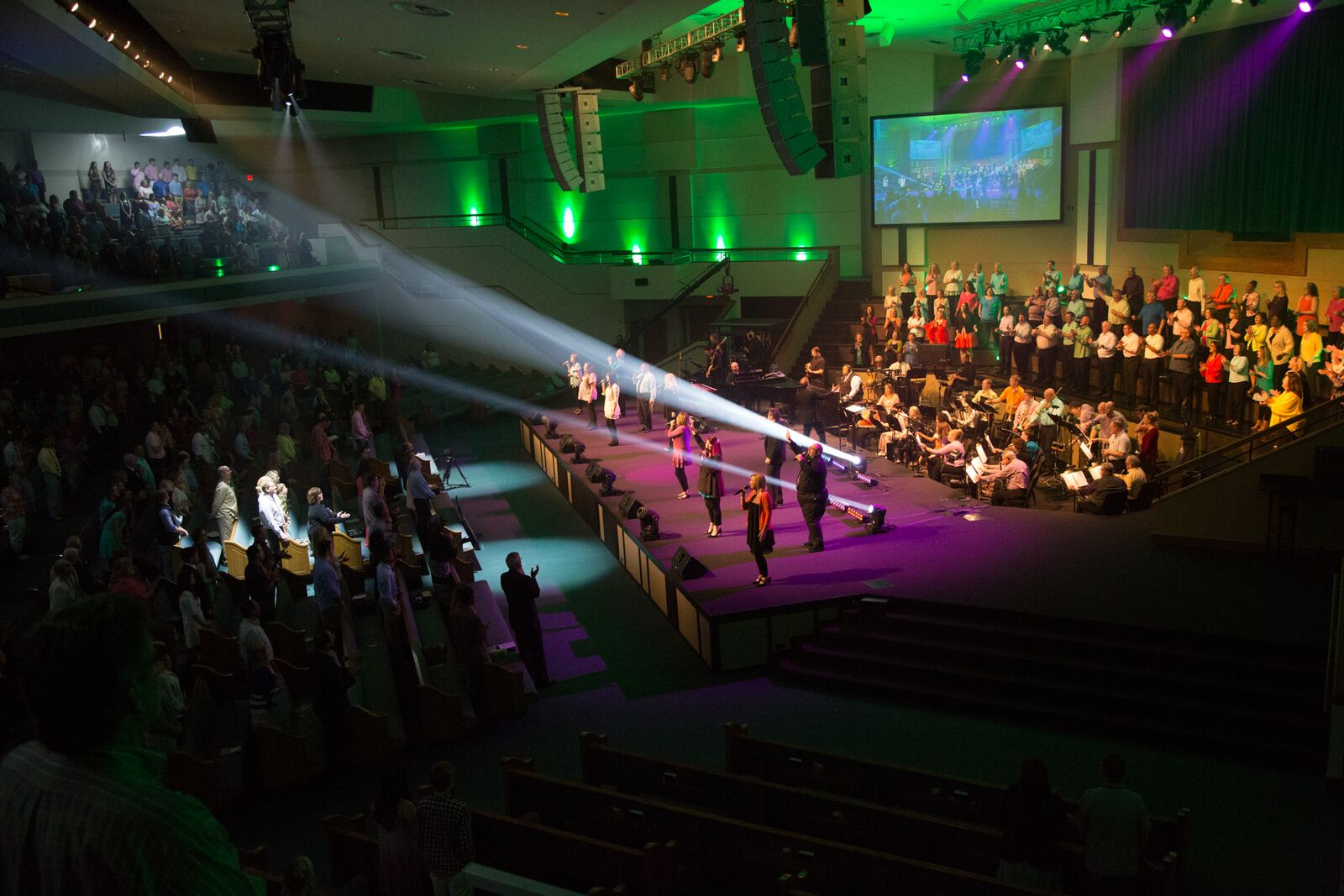
Worship service at Grace Baptist Church in Knoxville, Tennessee, affiliated to the convention, 2016

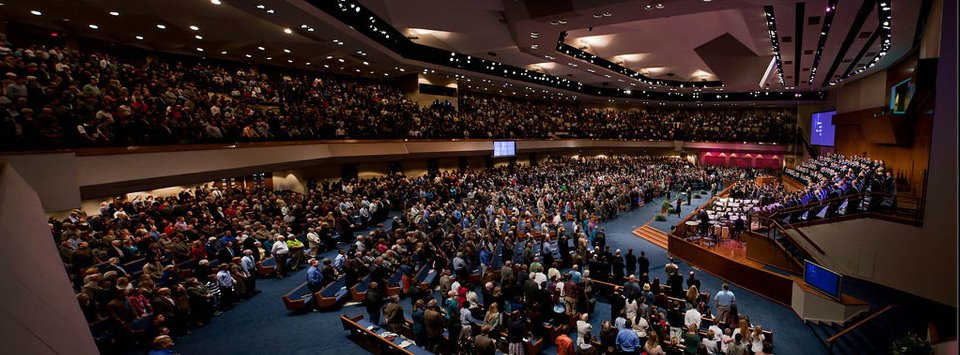
First Baptist Church of Jacksonville, Florida worship service

Most members observe a low church form of worship, which is less formal and uses no stated liturgy. The form of the worship services generally depends on whether the congregation uses a traditional or a contemporary service, or a mix of both—the main differences concerning music and the response to the sermon.

In both types of services, there will be a prayer at the opening of the service, before the sermon, and at closing. Offerings are taken, which may be around the middle of the service or at the end (with the increased popularity of electronic financial systems, some churches operate kiosks allowing givers the opportunity to do so online or through a phone app or website link). Responsive Scripture readings are uncommon but may be done on a special occasion.

In a traditional service, the music typically features hymns accompanied by a piano or organ (churches have generally phased out the latter due to a shift in worship preferences) and sometimes with a special featured soloist or choir. Smaller churches typically let anyone participate in the choir regardless of actual singing ability; larger churches will limit participation to those who have successfully tried out for a role. After the sermon, an invitation to respond (sometimes termed an altar call) might be given; people may respond during the invitation by receiving Jesus Christ as Lord and Savior and beginning Christian discipleship, seeking baptism or requesting to join the congregation, or entering into vocational ministry or making some other publicly stated decision. Churches may schedule baptisms on specific weekends, or (especially in buildings with built-in baptisteries) be readily available for anyone desiring baptism.

In a contemporary service, the music generally features modern songs led by a praise team or similarly named group with featured singers. Choirs are not as common. An altar call may or may not be given at the end; if not, interested persons are directed to seek out people in the lobby who can address any questions. Baptismal services are usually scheduled as specific and special events. Also, church membership is usually done periodically by attending specific classes about the church's history, beliefs, what it seeks to accomplish, and what is expected of a prospective member. Controversially, churches may ask a member to sign a "membership covenant", a document with the prospective member's promise to perform certain tasks (regular church attendance at main services and small groups, regular giving—sometimes even requiring tithing, and service within the church). Such covenants are highly controversial: among other things, such a covenant may not permit a member to withdraw from membership to avoid church discipline voluntarily, or, in some cases, the member cannot leave at all (even when not under discipline) without the approval of church leadership. A Dallas/Fort Worth church was forced to apologize to a member who attempted to do so for failing to request permission to annul her marriage after her husband admitted to viewing child pornography.

== Statistics ==
Year	Membership	Ref.
1845	350,000	
1860	650,000	
1875	1,260,000	
1890	1,240,000	
1905	1,900,000	
1920	3,150,000	
1935	4,480,000	
1950	7,080,000	
1965	10,780,000	
1980	13,700,000	
1995	15,400,000	
2000	15,900,000	
2005	16,600,000	
2006	16,306,246	
2007	16,266,920	
2008	16,228,438	
2009	16,160,088	
2010	16,136,044	
2011	15,978,112	
2012	15,872,404	
2013	15,735,640	
2014	15,499,173	
2015	15,294,764	
2016	15,216,978	
2017	15,005,638	
2018	14,813,234	
2019	14,525,579	
2020	14,089,947	
2021	13,680,493	
2022	13,223,122	
2023	12,982,090	
2024	12,722,266	
2025	12,331,954	

=== Membership ===
According to a 2026 census published by the convention, it had 46,876 churches, 4.3 million weekly worshippers, and 12,331,954 members.

The global convention has more than 1,161 local associations, 41 state conventions, and fellowships covering all 50 states and territories of the United States. The five U.S. states with the highest rates of membership are Texas, Georgia, North Carolina, Florida, and Tennessee. Texas has the largest number of members, with an estimated 2.75 million. Within Texas, these are divided among the more traditionalist Southern Baptists of Texas Convention and more moderate, diversified Baptist General Convention of Texas; the Baptist General Convention of Texas, or the Texas Baptists, are also more financially and organizationally autonomous from the primary convention in contrast to most state conventions.

Southern/Great Commission Baptists support thousands of missionaries in the United States and worldwide through the Cooperative Program.

=== Trends ===
Data from church sources and independent surveys indicate that since 1990 membership of Southern Baptist churches has declined as a proportion of the American population. Historically, the convention grew throughout its history until 2007, when membership decreased by a net figure of nearly 40,000 members. The total membership, of about 16.2 million, was flat over the same period, falling by 38,482 or 0.2%. An important indicator of the denomination's health is new baptisms, which have decreased yearly for seven of the last eight years. As of 2008, they had reached their lowest levels since 1987. Membership continued to decline from 2008 to 2012. The convention's statistical summary of 2014 recorded a loss of 236,467 members, their biggest one-year decline since 1881. In 2018, membership fell below 15 million for the first time since 1989 and reached its lowest level for over 30 years.

This decline in membership and baptisms has prompted some SBC researchers to describe the convention as a "denomination in decline". In 2008, former SBC president Frank Page suggested that if current conditions continue, half of all the convention's churches will close their doors permanently by 2030. A 2004 survey of SBC churches supported that assessment, finding that the membership of 70% of SBC churches is declining or has plateaued.

The decline in membership was discussed at the June 2008 Annual Convention. Curt Watke, a former researcher for the organization, noted four reasons for the decline of the church based on his research: the increase in immigration by non-European groups, decline in growth among predominantly European American (white) churches, the aging of the current membership, and a decrease in the proportion of younger generations participating in any church life. Some believe Baptists have not worked sufficiently to attract minorities.

On the other hand, the state conventions of Mississippi and Texas report an increasing proportion of minority members. In 1990, 5% of congregations were non-white. In 2012, the proportion of congregations of other ethnic groups (African American, Latino, and Asian) had increased to 20%. Sixty percent of the minority congregations were in Texas, particularly in the suburbs of Houston and Dallas. In 2020, an estimated 22.3% of affiliated churches were non-white.

The decline in SBC-GCB membership may be more pronounced than these statistics indicate because Baptist churches are not required to remove inactive members from their rolls, likely leading to greatly inflated membership numbers. In addition, hundreds of large, moderate congregations have shifted their primary allegiance to other Baptist groups, such as the American Baptist Churches USA, the Alliance of Baptists, or the Cooperative Baptist Fellowship, but have continued to remain on the convention's books. Their members are thus counted in the convention's totals, although these churches no longer participate in the annual convention meetings or make more than the minimum financial contributions.

Groups have sometimes withdrawn from the convention because of its conservative trends. On November 6, 2000, the Baptist General Convention of Texas voted to cut its contributions to Southern Baptist seminaries and reallocate more than $5 million to three theological seminaries that members believed were more moderate. These included the Hispanic Baptist Theological School in San Antonio, Baylor University's George W. Truett Theological Seminary in Waco, and Hardin–Simmons University's Logsdon School of Theology in Abilene. Since the controversies of the 1980s, the convention has established more than 20 theological or divinity programs directed toward moderate and progressive Baptists in the Southeastern United States. In addition to Texas, the convention established schools in Virginia, Georgia, North Carolina, and Alabama in the 1990s. These include the Baptist Theological Seminary in Richmond, McAfee School of Theology of Mercer University in Atlanta, Wake Forest, Gardner Webb and Campbell Divinity schools in North Carolina, and Beeson Divinity School at Samford University. These schools contributed to the flat and declining enrollment at seminaries operating in the same region of the United States. Texas and Virginia have the largest state conventions identified as moderate in theological approach.

On June 4, 2020, the organization reported a drop in membership—the 13th consecutive year that membership declined. Total membership in the church fell almost 2% to 14,525,579 from 2018 to 2019. In 2022, the church lost another 457,371 members (the largest drop in over a century) to 13,223,122, a similar level as the late 1970s.

== Organization ==
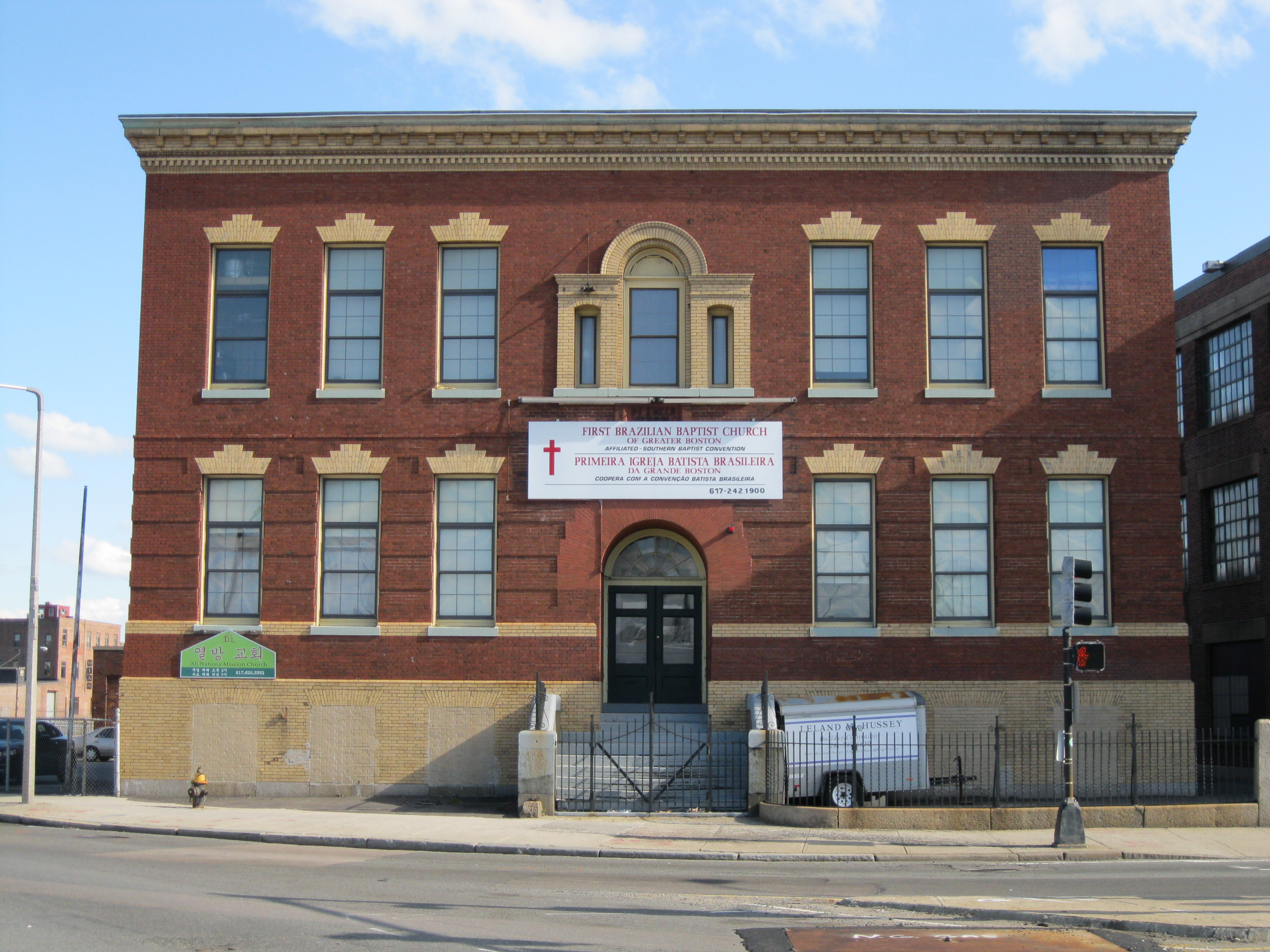
First Brazilian Baptist Church in Charlestown, Massachusetts

The denomination has four levels of organization: the local congregation, the local association, the state convention, and the national convention. There are 41 affiliated state conventions or fellowships.

The national and state conventions and local associations are cooperative associations by which churches can voluntarily pool resources to support missionary and other work. Because of the basic Baptist principle of the autonomy of the local church and the congregationalist polity of the denomination, neither the national convention nor the state conventions or local associations has any administrative or ecclesiastical control over local churches; such a group may disfellowship a local congregation over an issue, but may not terminate its leadership or members or force its closure. The national convention has no authority over state conventions or local associations, nor do state conventions have authority over local associations. Furthermore, no individual congregation has any authority over any other congregation; a church may oversee another congregation voluntarily as a mission work, but another congregation has the right to become an independent congregation at any time.

Article IV. Authority: While independent and sovereign in its own sphere, the Convention does not claim and will never attempt to exercise any authority over any other Baptist body, whether church, auxiliary organizations, associations, or convention.

The national convention maintains a central administrative organization in Nashville, Tennessee. Its executive committee exercises authority and control over seminaries and other institutions owned by the national convention.

The national convention had around 10,000 ethnic churches as of 2008. Commitment to the autonomy of local churches was the primary force behind its executive committee's rejection of a proposal to create a convention-wide database of clergy accused of sexual crimes against congregants or other minors in order to stop the "recurring tide" of clergy sexual abuse within affiliated congregations. A 2009 study by Lifeway Christian Resources, the convention's research and publishing arm, revealed that one in eight background checks for potential volunteer or church workers revealed a history of crime that could have prevented them from working.

The denominational statement of faith, the Baptist Faith and Message, is not binding on churches or members due to the autonomy of the local church (though national convention employees and missionaries must agree to its views as a condition of employment or missionary support). Politically and culturally, Southern/Great Commission Baptists tend to be conservative. Most oppose homosexual activity and abortion.

=== Pastor and deacon ===
Generally, Baptists recognize only two scriptural offices: pastor-teacher and deacon. The convention passed a resolution in the early 1980s officially restricting offices requiring ordination to men. According to the Baptist Faith and Message, the office of pastor is limited to men based on New Testament scriptures.

=== Annual meeting ===
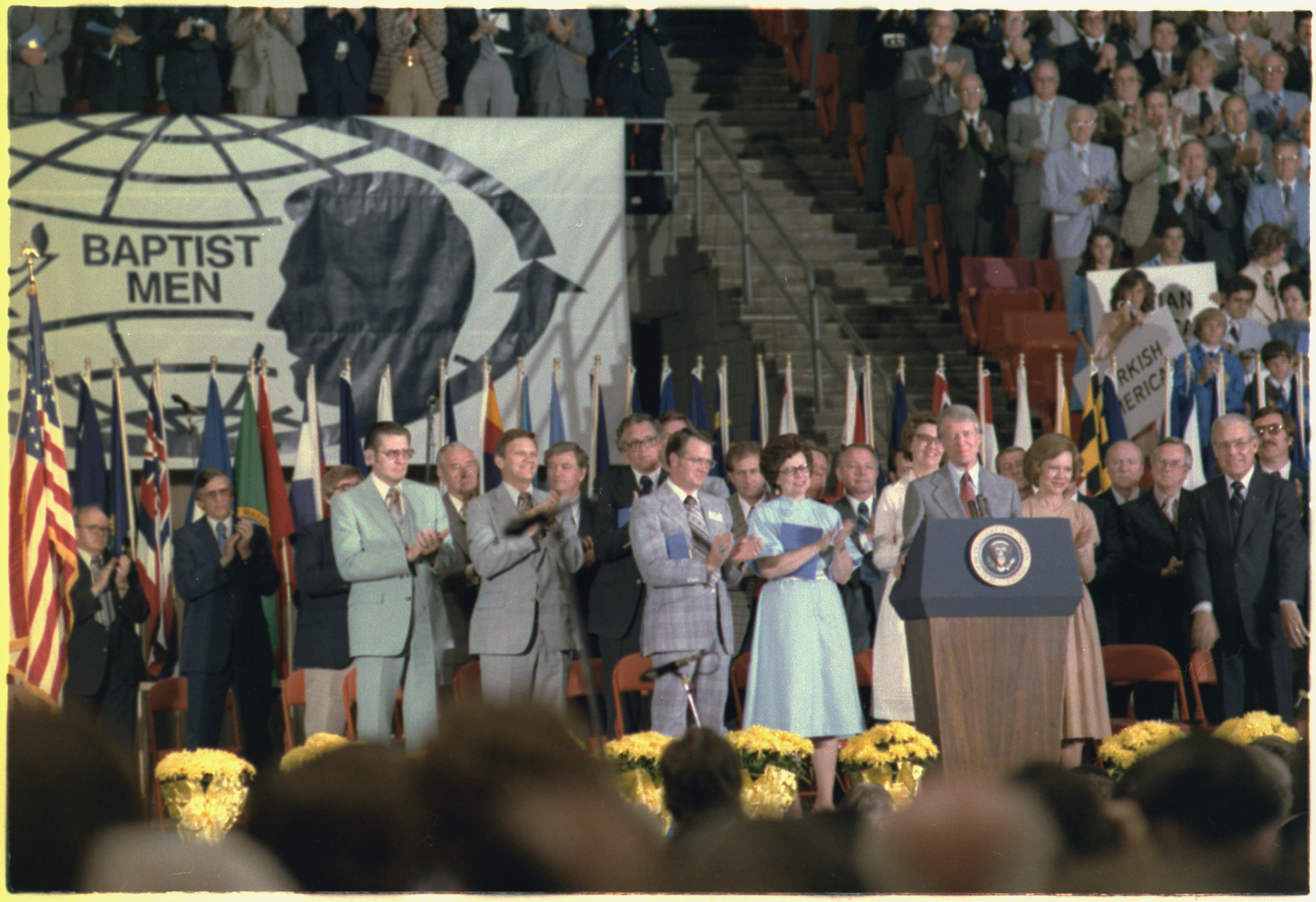
President Jimmy Carter addressing the SBC in Atlanta in 1978 (in 2000, Carter broke with the SBC over its position on the status of women)

The annual meeting (held in June over two days) consists of delegates (called "messengers") from cooperating churches. The messengers confer, determine the convention's programs, policies, and budget, and elect the officers and committees. Each cooperating church is allowed up to two messengers regardless of the amount given to convention entities and may have more depending on the amount of contributions (in dollars or percent of the church's budget), but the maximum number of messengers permitted from any church is 12.

== Missions and affiliated organizations ==
=== Cooperative Program ===
The Cooperative Program (CP) is the organization's unified funds collection and distribution program for the support of regional, national, and international ministries; contributions from affiliated congregations fund the CP.

In the fiscal year ending September 30, 2008, the local congregations of the denomination reported gift receipts of $11.1 billion. From this they sent $548 million, approximately five percent, to their state Baptist conventions through the CP. Of this amount, the state Baptist conventions retained $344 million for their work. State conventions sent $204 million to the national CP budget to support denomination-wide ministries.

=== Mission agencies ===
The denomination was organized in 1845 to create a mission board to support the sending of Baptist missionaries. The North American Mission Board, or NAMB, (founded as the Domestic Mission Board, and later the Home Mission Board) in Alpharetta, Georgia serves missionaries involved in evangelism and church planting in the U.S. and Canada, while the International Mission Board, or IMB, (originally the Foreign Mission Board) in Richmond, Virginia, sponsors missionaries to the rest of the world.

Baptist Men is the mission organization for men in the convention's churches and is under the North American Mission Board.

The Woman's Missionary Union, founded in 1888, is an auxiliary to the national convention, which helps facilitate two large annual missions offerings: the Annie Armstrong Easter Offering (for North American missions) and the Lottie Moon Christmas Offering (for international missions).

=== Send Relief ===
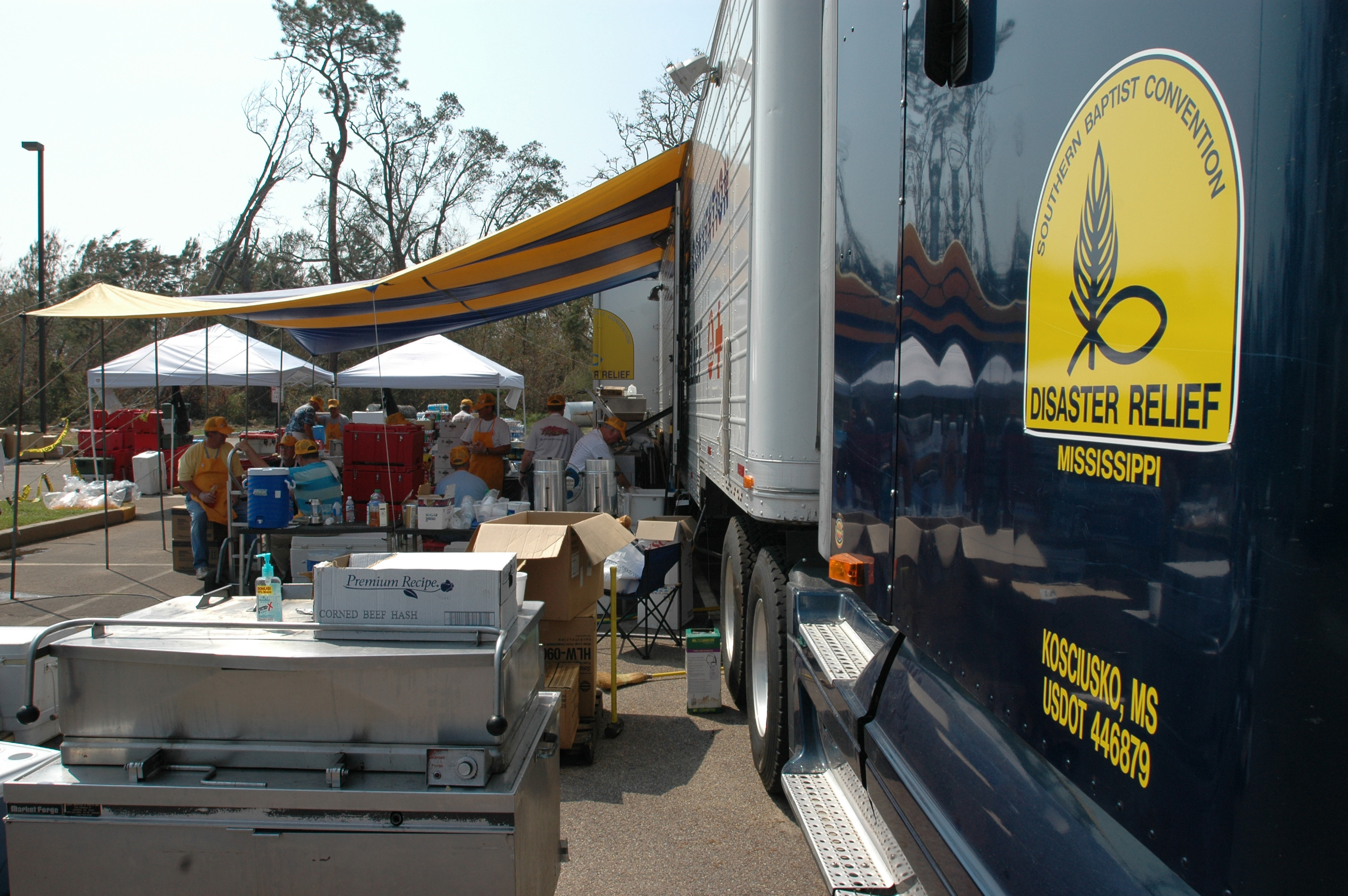
Southern Baptist Convention Disaster Relief volunteers prepare food in D'Iberville, Mississippi, September 12, 2005.

Among the more visible organizations within the North American Mission Board is Southern Baptist Disaster Relief. In 1967, a small group of Texas Southern Baptist volunteers helped victims of Hurricane Beulah by serving hot food cooked on small "buddy burners". In 2005, volunteers responded to 166 named disasters, prepared 17,124,738 meals, repaired 7,246 homes, and removed debris from 13,986 yards. Southern Baptist Disaster Relief provides many different types: food, water, child care, communication, showers, laundry, repairs, rebuilding, or other essential tangible items that contribute to the resumption of life following the crisis—and the message of the Gospel. All assistance is provided to individuals and communities free of charge. SBC DR volunteer kitchens prepare much of the food distributed by the Red Cross in major disasters.

=== Southern Baptist Association of Christian Schools ===
The SBC has various primary and secondary schools affiliated with the Southern Baptist Association of Christian Schools.

=== Universities and colleges ===
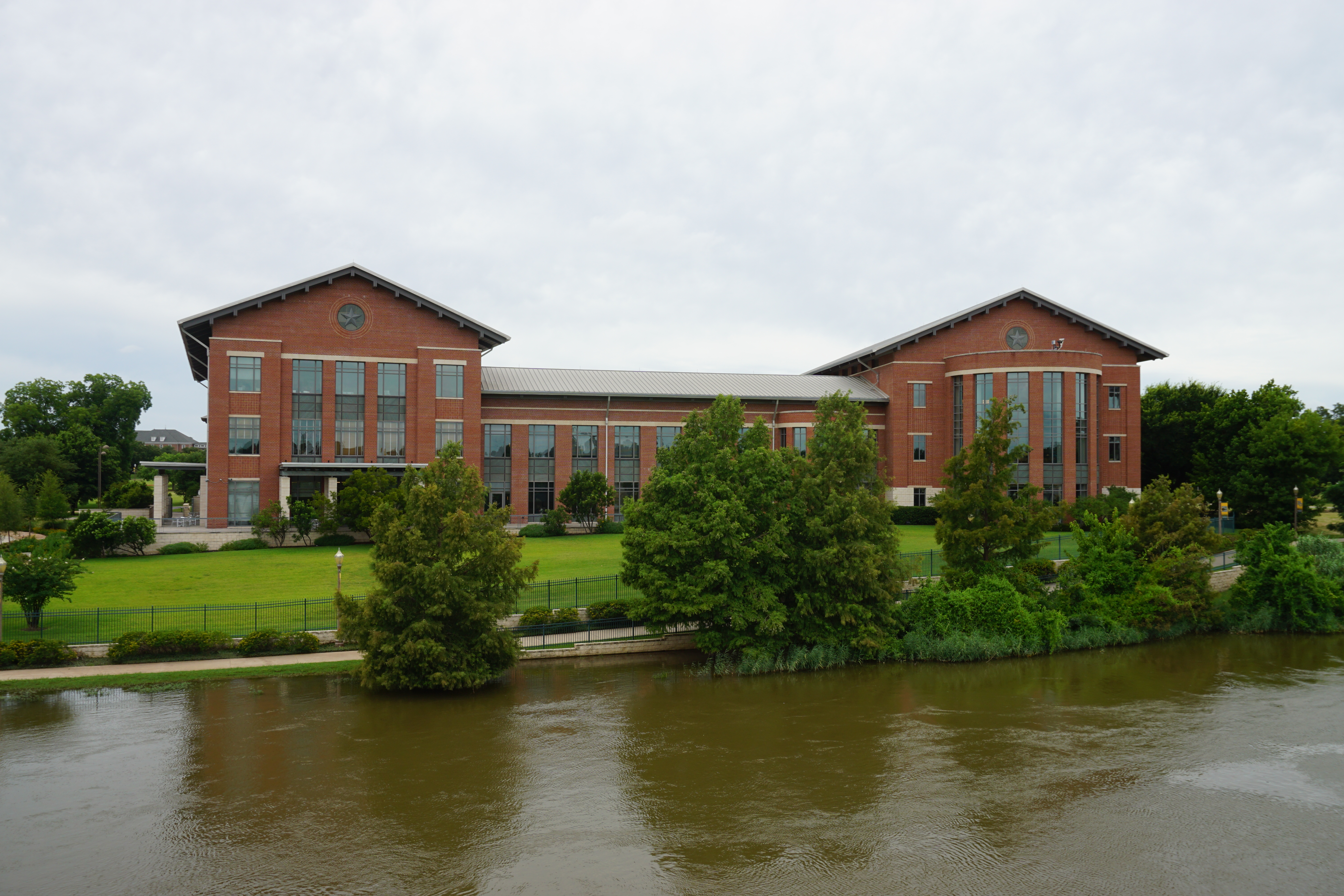
Sheila and Walter Umphrey Law Center, Baylor University in Waco, Texas, affiliated with the convention through the Texas Baptists

The SBC has several affiliated universities.

=== Seminaries ===
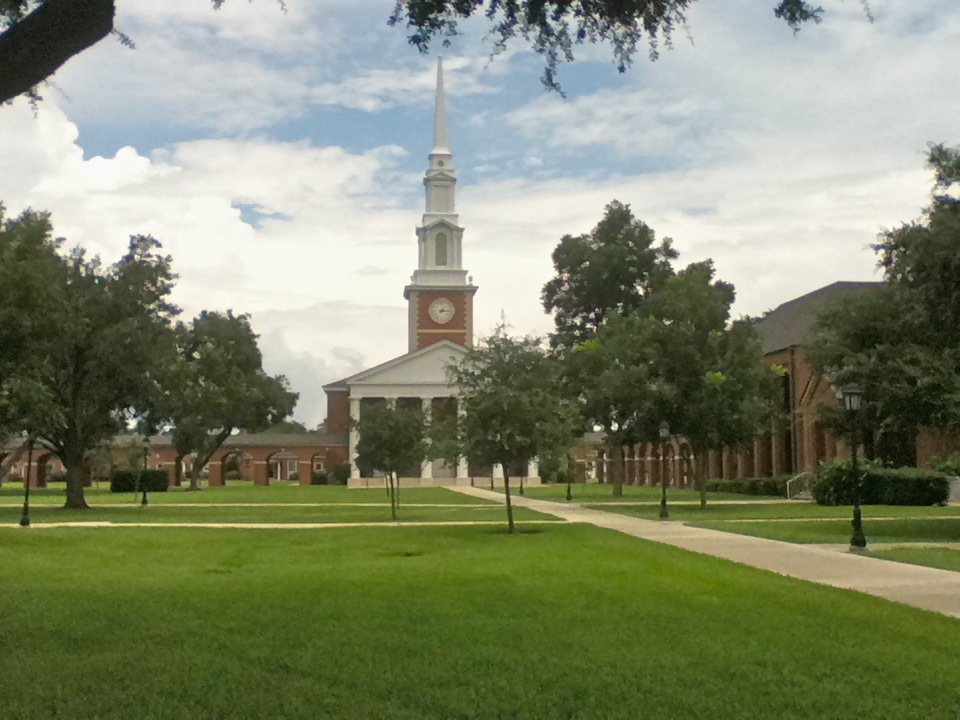
New Orleans Baptist Theological Seminary's chapel

The national convention directly supports six theological seminaries devoted to ministry preparation.

- Southern Baptist Theological Seminary, Louisville, Kentucky (1859, originally in Greenville, South Carolina)
- Southwestern Baptist Theological Seminary, Fort Worth, Texas (1908, originally part of Baylor University in Waco, Texas).
- New Orleans Baptist Theological Seminary, New Orleans, Louisiana (1916, originally New Orleans Baptist Bible Institute)
- Gateway Seminary, Ontario, California (1944, initially in Oakland, California, and formerly called Golden Gate Baptist Theological Seminary)
- Southeastern Baptist Theological Seminary, Wake Forest, North Carolina (1950)
- Midwestern Baptist Theological Seminary, Kansas City, Missouri (1957)

=== Other organizations ===
Other notable organizations under the national convention include:

- Baptist Press, the nation's largest Christian news service, established by the convention in 1946;
- Baptist Collegiate Network, the college-level organization operating campus and international missions typically known as the Baptist Student Union and Baptist Collegiate Ministries;
- GuideStone Financial Resources (formerly called the Annuity Board of the Southern Baptist Convention, and founded in 1918 as the Relief Board of the Southern Baptist Convention), which provides insurance, retirement, and investment services to churches, ministers, and employees of affiliated churches and agencies (it also provides these services to non-SBC churches and church members);
- LifeWay Christian Resources, founded as the Baptist Sunday School Board in 1891, one of the nation's largest Christian publishing houses, which previously operated the "LifeWay Christian Stores" (formerly "Baptist Book Stores") until closing physical stores in 2019;
- Ethics & Religious Liberty Commission (formerly known as the Christian Life Commission of the SBC), dedicated to addressing social and moral concerns and their implications on public policy issues from city hall to Congress and the courts; and
- the Southern Baptist Historical Library and Archives, in Nashville, Tennessee, the official depository for the denomination's archives and a research center for the study of Baptists worldwide. The SBHLA website includes digital resources.

== Controversies ==
From its establishment to the present day, the organization has experienced several periods of major internal controversy.

=== Landmark controversy ===
In the 1850s–1860s, a group of young activists called for a return to certain early practices, or what they called Landmarkism. Other leaders disagreed with their assertions, and the Baptist congregations became split on the issues. Eventually, the disagreements led to the formation of Gospel Missions and the American Baptist Association (1924), as well as many unaffiliated independent churches. One historian called the related James Robinson Graves—Robert Boyte Crawford Howell controversy (1858–60) the greatest to affect the denomination before that of the late 20th century involving the fundamentalist-moderate break.

=== Whitsitt controversy ===
In the Whitsitt controversy of 1896–99, William H. Whitsitt, a professor at Southern Baptist Theological Seminary, suggested that contrary to earlier thought, English Baptists did not begin to baptize by immersion until 1641, when some Anabaptists, as they were then called, began to practice immersion. This went against the idea of immersion, which was the practice of the earliest Baptists, as some Landmarkists contended.

=== American Civil War ===
During the 19th and most of the 20th century, the organization, reflecting Southern attitudes toward politics, supported white supremacy, racial segregation, the Confederacy, and the Lost Cause. The organization also denounced interracial marriage as an "abomination", citing the Bible. Beginning in the late 1970s, a conservative movement began to take control of the organization. By the 1990s, this movement succeeded in taking control of the SBC leadership. In 1995, it officially denounced racism and its white supremacist history. In the 21st century, after the election of its first black president, the SBC adopted the "Great Commission Baptists" descriptor, which gained prominent use among several churches that wished to sever themselves from its white supremacist history and controversies. By 2008, almost 20% of SBC congregations were majority African American, Asian, Hispanic, or Latino, reflecting the denomination's increased racial diversity. SBC-cooperating churches had an estimated one million African American members. By 2018, the denomination had passed resolutions that recommended gaining more black members and appointing more African American leaders.

=== Moderates–conservatives controversy ===
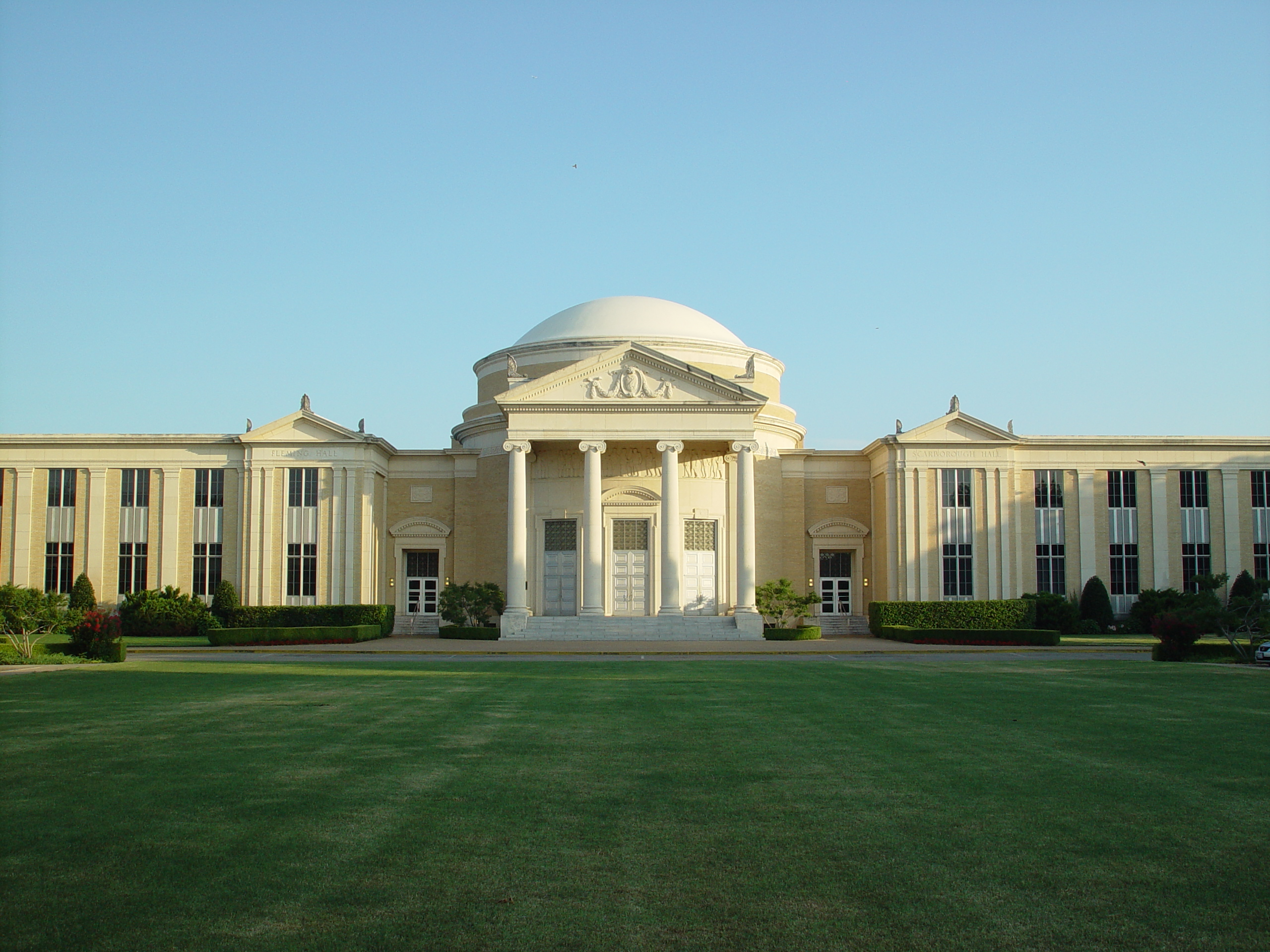
B.H. Carroll Memorial Building, the Southwestern Baptist Theological Seminary's main administrative building

The Southern Baptist Convention conservative resurgence (c. 1970–2000) was an intense struggle for control of the national convention's resources and ideological direction.

In July 1961, Professor Ralph Elliott at Midwestern Baptist Theological Seminary in Kansas City published The Message of Genesis, a book rejecting biblical inerrancy. In the 1970s, other convention seminary professors came under suspicion of liberal Christianity.

In response to these events, a group of pastors led by Judge Paul Pressler and Pastor Paige Patterson campaigned at conferences in churches for a more conservative direction in Convention policies. This group's candidate, Adrian Rogers, was elected Convention president at the 1979 annual meeting. After the election, the organization's new leaders replaced all Southern Baptist agency leaders with people who said they were more conservative. Its initiators called it a "Southern Baptist Convention conservative resurgence", while its moderate opponents called it a "fundamentalist takeover".

Russell H. Dilday, president of the Southwestern Baptist Theological Seminary from 1978 to 1994, said the resurgence fragmented Southern Baptist fellowship and was "far more serious than [a controversy]", calling it as "a self-destructive, contentious, one-sided feud that at times took on combative characteristics". Since 1979, Southern Baptists had become polarized into two major groups: moderates and conservatives. Reflecting the conservative majority votes of messengers at the 1979 annual meeting of the SBC, the new national organization officers replaced all leaders of Southern Baptist agencies with presumably more conservative people (often dubbed "fundamentalist" by dissenters). (Note: The era of conservative resurgence was accompanied by the erosion of more-liberal members (see, e.g., G. Avery Lee).)

In 1984, this group was heavily involved in passing a resolution excluding women from pastoral leadership.

In 1987, a group of churches criticized the fundamentalists for controlling the leadership and founded the Alliance of Baptists. A group of moderate churches criticized the denomination for the same reasons, as well as opposition to women's ministry, and founded the Cooperative Baptist Fellowship in 1991.

In 2019, after the scandals of sexual abuse accusations involving the deacon Paul Pressler and sexual abuse cover-ups involving former president Paige Patterson, the Southwestern Baptist Theological Seminary removed the stained-glass windows from the MacGorman Chapel opened in 2011 depicting them as actors of a "conservative resurgence".

=== Marriage ===
Since 1976, the Convention has adopted 22 resolutions supporting only marriage between a man and a woman and opposing same-sex marriage.

Since 1992, the national convention has "disfellowshipped" various churches that support LGBTQ inclusion. In 2018, the District of Columbia Baptist Convention was disfellowshipped for this reason.

On June 10, 2025, at the annual meeting in Dallas, the convention voted overwhelmingly in favor of working to overturn the legal right to same-sex marriage. It was the first time the SBC had asked representatives of its member churches to do this. The same resolution opposed "transgender ideology". The resolution, "On Restoring Moral Clarity through God's Design for Gender, Marriage, and the Family", was written by Andrew T. Walker, an ethicist at a Kentucky seminary.

=== Iraq War ===
In 2002, in the leadup to the Iraq War, the conference endorsed it as a just war as outlined by the Land Letter. It was the only mainstream Christian denomination to support US intervention. After the war started, the convention continued supporting it. As the war dragged on, support for it eroded, with many questioning the convention's position.

=== Critical race theory ===
By November 2020, the six convention seminary presidents called critical race theory "unbiblical". They emphasized the importance of not turning to secular ideas to confront racism. Four African American churches left the SBC over the leadership's charged statement on the issue.

== See also ==
- List of Baptist denominations
- List of Southern Baptist Convention affiliated people
- List of the largest Protestant denominations
- Evangelicalism in the United States
- Southern Baptist Convention Presidents
- Christian views on slavery
- Christianity in the United States
- Religion in the United States
