= Steven A. Schaick =

United States Air Force general

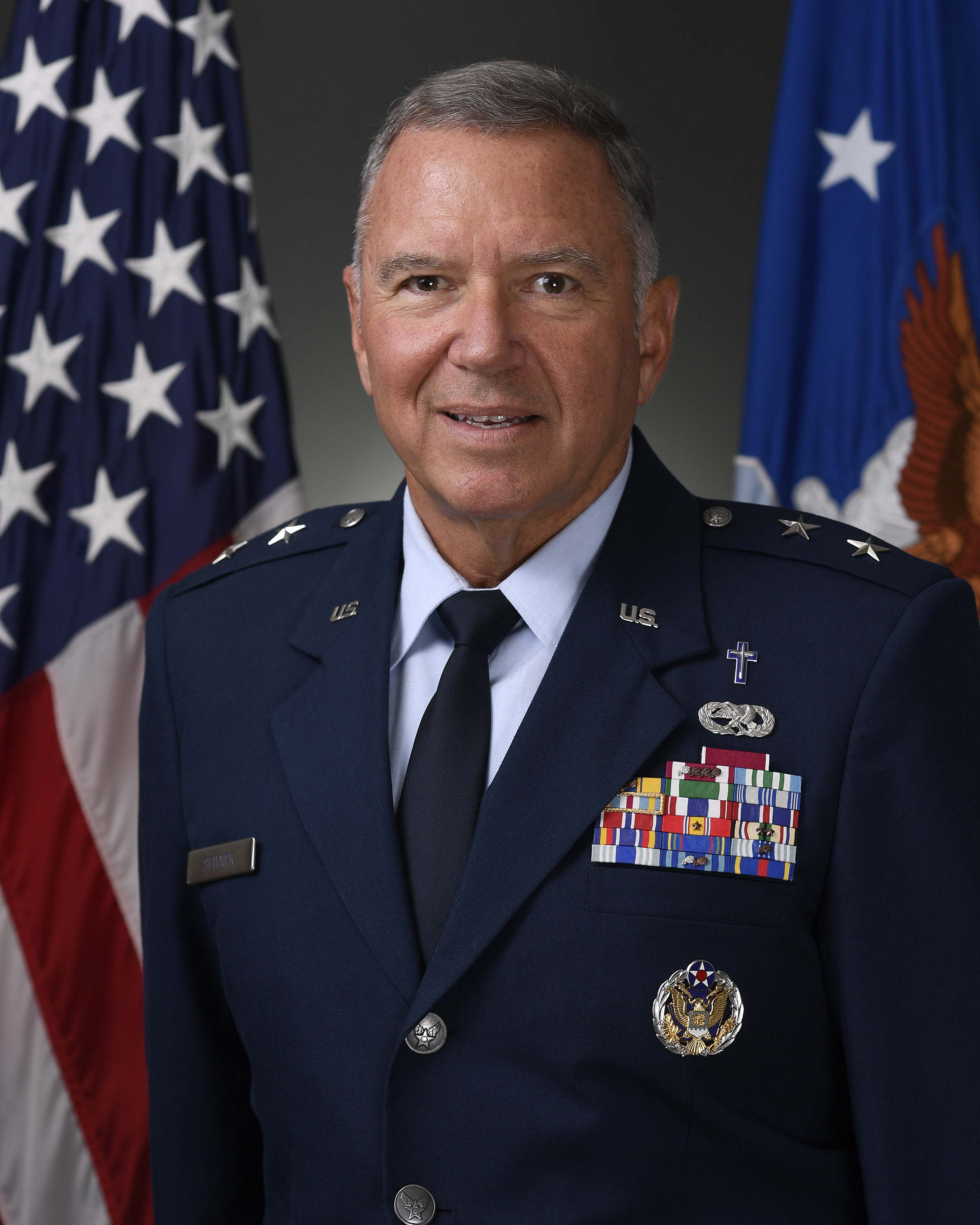
- Chaplain (Major General) Steven A. Schaick; 19th Chief of Chaplains of the United States Air Force
- Born: June 7, 1958 (age 68)
- Military career
- Allegiance: United States
- Branch: United States Air Force
- Service years: 1976–1980; 1985–2021
- Rank: Major General
- Commands: Chief of Chaplains of the United States Air Force; Deputy Chief of Chaplains of the United States Air Force

Steven Alan Schaick (born June 7, 1958) is a retired major general in the United States Air Force, and an ordained Presbyterian minister, who last served as the 19th Chief of Chaplains of the United States Air Force. He previously served as the 25th Deputy Chief of Chaplains of the United States Air Force, Headquarters U. S. Air Force, Pentagon, Washington, D.C. As the deputy chief of chaplains, he was a member of the special staff of the Chief of Staff, Schaick assists the Chief of Chaplains of the United States Air Force in establishing guidance on all matters pertaining to the religious and moral welfare of Air Force personnel and their dependents and directing and maintaining a trained, equipped and professional Chaplain Corps of more than 2,200 chaplains and chaplain assistants from the active and Air Reserve components. As a member of the Armed Forces Chaplains Board, he and other members advise the Secretary of Defense and Joint Chiefs of Staff on religious, ethical and quality-of-life concerns.

Schaick is a native of Oshkosh, Wisconsin, and enlisted in the U.S. Air Force in 1976 serving four years as an F-15 Integrated Avionics Component Specialist. He was commissioned in the Air Force Reserves as a chaplain candidate in 1985 and into the active duty chaplaincy in 1988. Schaick served three different major commands as a staff chaplain, followed by special duty assignment to Arlington National Cemetery. He led a division in the Center for Character Development at the U.S. Air Force Academy and went on to serve as a wing chaplain in Air Force Special Operations Command. Schaick served as the deputy command chaplain for both Air Force Special Operations Command and Air Combat Command. He served as the Senior Staff Chaplain for the Air Force Intelligence, Surveillance and Reconnaissance Agency and the command chaplain for Air Education and Training Command. An ordained Presbyterian minister, Schaick is endorsed by the Presbyterian Church, USA.

In December 2019, Schaick was appointed the first Chief of Chaplains of the United States Space Force.

== Awards and decorations ==

| Badge | Air Force Christian Chaplain Badge | | |
| Badge | Basic Maintenance & Munitions Badge | | |
| 1st Row | Legion of Merit | Meritorious Service Medal with one silver and three bronze oak leaf clusters | Joint Service Commendation Medal |
| 2nd Row | Air Force Commendation Medal with oak leaf cluster | Navy and Marine Corps Commendation Medal | Air Force Achievement Medal |
| 3rd Row | Joint Meritorious Unit Award | Air Force Meritorious Unit Award | Air Force Outstanding Unit Award |
| 4th Row | Air Force Organizational Excellence Award | National Defense Service Medal with one bronze service star | Southwest Asia Service Medal with two service stars |
| 5th Row | Global War on Terrorism Service Medal | Nuclear Deterrence Operations Service Medal | Air Force Overseas Service Ribbon - Short Tour with oak leaf cluster |
| 6th Row | Air Force Overseas Service Ribbon - Long Tour | Air Force Longevity Service Award Ribbon with silver and three bronze oak leaf clusters | Air Force Training Ribbon |
| Badge | Headquarters Air Force badge | | |

Military offices
| Preceded by Bobby V. Page | Deputy Chief of Chaplains of the United States Air Force; 2015–2018 | Succeeded by Ronald M. Harvell |
| Preceded by Dondi E. Costin | Chief of Chaplains of the United States Air Force; 2018–2021 | Vacant |
| Preceded by Inaugural | Chief of Chaplains of the United States Space Force; 2019–present | Incumbent |
