= Deputy Chief of Chaplains of the United States Air Force =

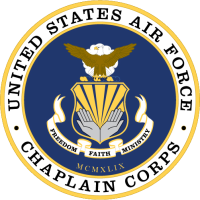

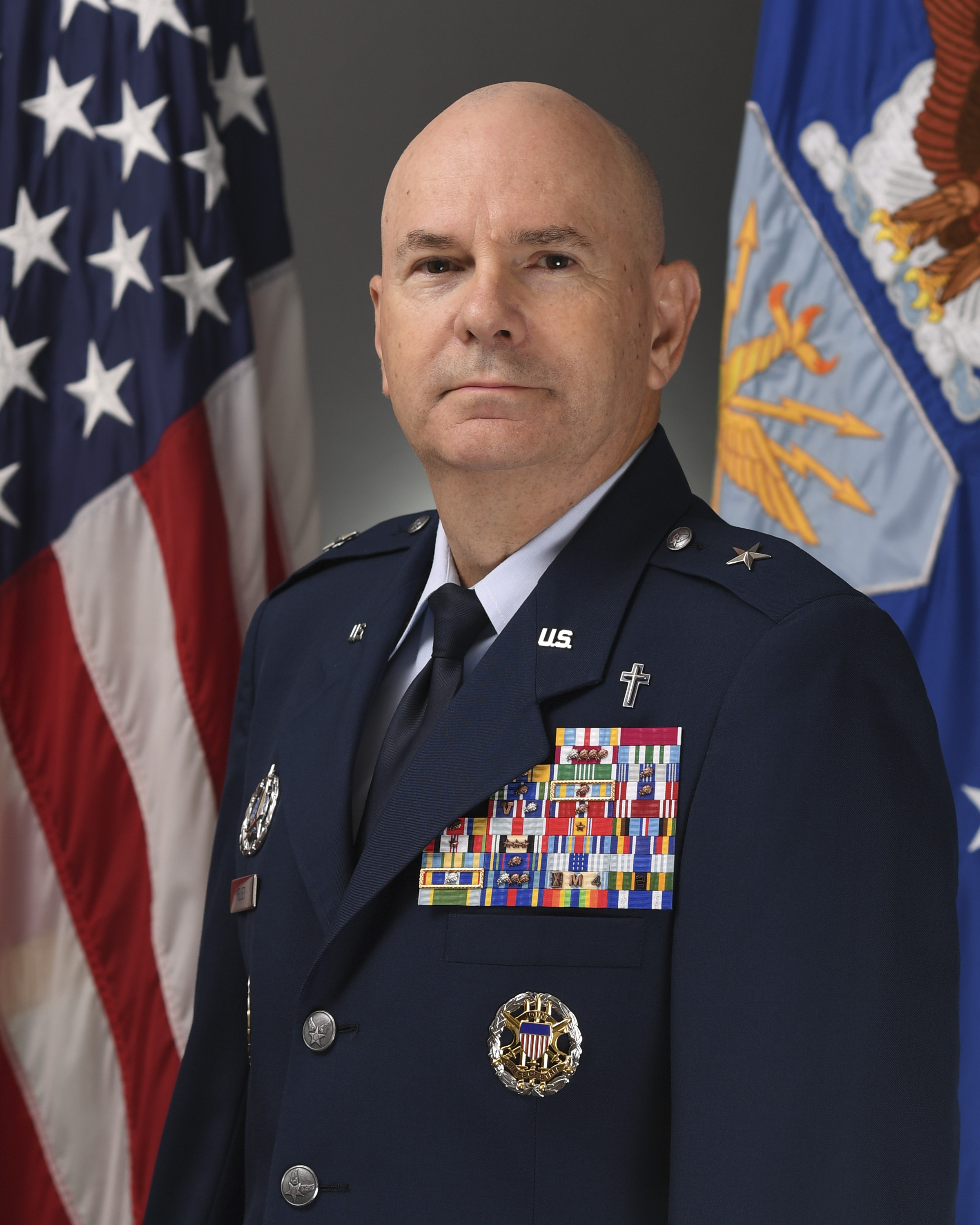
- Incumbent; Brig Gen David W. Kelley since 9 August 2024
- Formation: 1949
- First holder: Col Peter A. Dunn
- Website: https://www.airforce.com/careers/specialty-careers/chaplain

The Deputy Chief of Chaplains of the United States Air Force is the second senior-most chaplain in the United States Air Force Chaplain Corps, holding the rank of brigadier general, and acting as principal deputy to the Chief of Chaplains of the United States Air Force.

== Air Force Chaplains ==
Official Air Force instructions task chaplains with providing "spiritual care and the opportunity for Airmen, their families, and other authorized personnel to exercise their constitutional right to the free exercise of religion." This goal is accomplished through "religious observances, providing pastoral care, and advising leadership on spiritual, ethical, moral, morale, core values," in addition to additional religious accommodation issues that have already been identified or might arise in the future.

Additionally, "Chaplain Corps personnel conduct needs assessment based upon the commander’s mission requirements in order to plan and execute religious programs."

== Armed Forces Chaplains Board ==
As the active duty Deputy Chief of Chaplains for the Air Force, the man or woman holding this position is one of the six chaplains (Chiefs of Chaplains and active duty Deputy Chiefs of Chaplains of the Army, Navy, and Air Force) who together comprise the Armed Forces Chaplains Board, advising the Secretary of Defense and Under Secretary of Defense for Personnel and Readiness on matters affecting military personnel throughout the U.S. military services.

== U.S. Air Force Deputy Chiefs of Chaplains ==
	Name	Photo	Term began	Term ended
1.	Col Peter A. Dunn		July 1949	August 1950
2.	Brig Gen Augustus F. Gearhard		September 1950	August 1953
3.	Brig Gen Terence P. Finnegan		August 1953	August 1958
4.	Brig Gen Robert P. Taylor		August 1958	September 1962
5.	Brig Gen Edwin R. Chess		September 1962	July 1966
6.	Brig Gen William Leon Clark		August 1966	February 1969
7.	Brig Gen Roy M. Terry		March 1969	July 1970
8.	Brig Gen John F. Albert		August 1970	July 1972
9.	Brig Gen Henry J. Meade		August 1972	July 1974
10.	Brig Gen Thomas M. Groome Jr.		August 1974	July 1976
11.	Brig Gen Richard Carr		August 1976	July 1978
12.	Brig Gen Jeremiah J. Rodell		August 1978	July 1980
13.	Brig Gen John A. Collins		August 1980	July 1982
14.	Brig Gen Stuart E. Barstad		August 1982	November 1985
15.	Brig Gen John P. McDonough		1985	1988
16.	Brig Gen Donald J. Harlin		1988	1991
17.	Brig Gen Arthur S. Thomas		1991	1995
18.	Brig Gen William J. Dendinger		1995	1997
19.	Brig Gen Hiram "Doc" Jones		1997	1999
20.	Brig Gen Lorraine K. Potter		1999	2001
21.	Brig Gen Charles C. Baldwin		2001	April 2004
22.	Brig Gen Cecil Richardson		April 2004	May 2008
23.	Brig Gen David H. Cyr		2008	2011
24.	Brig Gen Howard D. Stendahl		2008	2012
25.	Brig Gen Bobby V. Page		2 August 2012	September 2015
26.	Brig Gen Steven A. Schaick		September 2015	August 2018
27.	Brig Gen Ronald M. Harvell		August 2018	August 2020
28.	Brig Gen Randall E. Kitchens		August 2020	October 2021
29.	Brig Gen James D. Brantingham		December 2021	January 2023
30.	Brig Gen Trent C. Davis		5 December 2023	9 August 2024
31.	Brig Gen David W. Kelley		9 August 2024	Incumbent

== See also ==
- Armed Forces Chaplains Board
- Chaplain
- Chief of Chaplains of the United States Air Force
- Chiefs of Chaplains of the United States
- Military chaplain
