= Lorraine K. Potter =

United States Air Force general

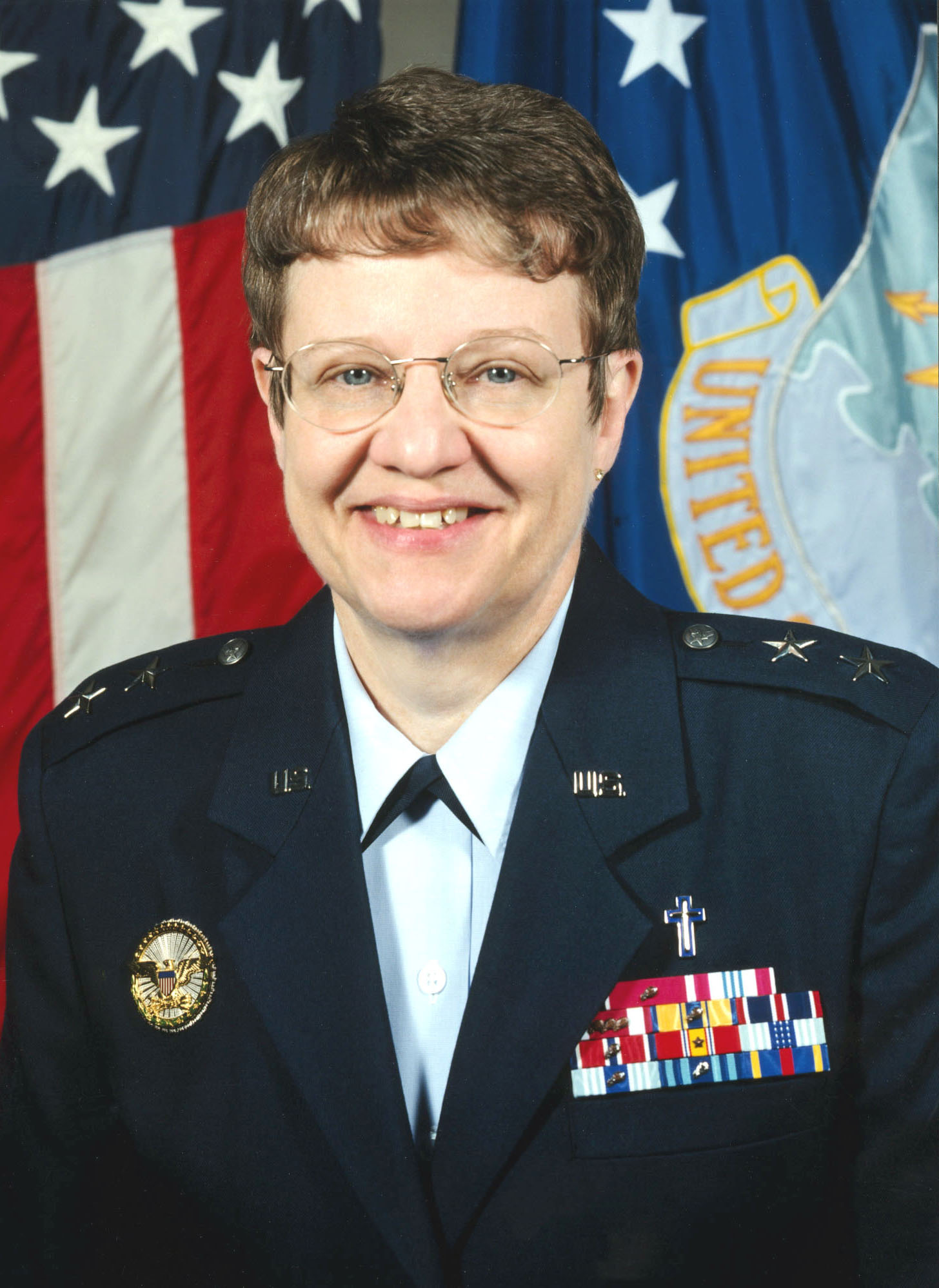
- Born: 1946 (age 79–80)
- Military career
- Allegiance: United States of America
- Branch: United States Air Force
- Service years: 1973–2004
- Rank: Major General
- Commands: Chief of Chaplains of the United States Air Force; Deputy Chief of Chaplains of the United States Air Force

Lorraine Kay Potter (née Fallon; 1946) is a former Chief of Chaplains of the United States Air Force and was the first female chaplain in the United States Air Force.

== Biography ==
A native of Warwick, Rhode Island, Potter is an ordained Baptist minister. She is a graduate of Keuka College, Colgate Rochester Crozer Divinity School and Central Michigan University. Her husband, Robert, is also a former United States Army chaplain, who reached the rank of colonel.

== Career ==
Potter initially inquired about serving as a military chaplain in 1972. She sent a letter to the Chief of Chaplains of the United States Air Force at the time, Roy M. Terry. The response stated that one of the qualifications for a chaplain in the air force was that they had to be male. Several weeks later, she received a letter stating that the Chief of Chaplains had dropped the gender requirement, and that if her church gave her an endorsement, it would be possible for her to become an air force chaplain. She received the endorsement and eventually was commissioned an officer in 1973.

In 1992, while stationed at Bolling Air Force Base, she was promoted to colonel. As was she the first female chaplain to reach that rank, then-Air Force Chief of Staff Merrill McPeak organized a special ceremony at The Pentagon to commemorate the occasion.

From 1994 to 1995, she served as executive director of the Armed Forces Chaplains Board before serving as Command Chaplain of the United States Air Forces in Europe. She also served as Command Chaplain at Headquarters Air Education and Training Command and briefly returned to Bolling Air Force Base before she was named Deputy Chief of Chaplains of the United States Air Force with the rank of brigadier general in 1999. In 2001, she was promoted to Chief of Chaplains with the rank of major general and held that position until her retirement in 2004.

== Awards and military decorations ==
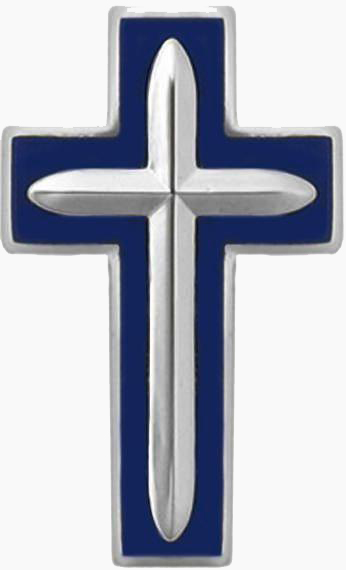

Badge	Air Force Christian Chaplain Badge		
1st Row	Air Force Distinguished Service Medal	Legion of Merit with one bronze oak leaf cluster	Defense Meritorious Service Medal
2nd Row	Meritorious Service Medal with three oak leaf clusters	Air Force Commendation Medal with oak leaf cluster	Air Force Outstanding Unit Award
3rd Row	Air Force Organizational Excellence Award with oak leaf cluster	National Defense Service Medal with one bronze service star	Air Force Overseas Ribbon - Short
4th Row	Air Force Overseas Ribbon - Long with oak leaf cluster	Air Force Longevity Service Award Ribbon with silver and bronze oak leaf clusters	Air Force Training Ribbon
Badge	Office of the Secretary of Defense Identification Badge		

Military offices
Preceded by William J. Dendinger	Chief of Chaplains of the United States Air Force; 2001–2004	Succeeded by Charles C. Baldwin
