= Leon Clarke (disambiguation) =

Leon Clarke (born 1985) is an English footballer.

Leon Clark(e) may also refer to:

- Leon Clarke (American football) (1933–2009), American football player and hurdler
- Leon Pierce Clark (1870–1933), American psychiatrist and psychoanalyst
- Leon Clark (basketball), American basketball player

== See also ==
- William Leon Clark (1911–2005), Deputy Chief of Chaplains of the United States Air Force
