= General Terry =

General Terry may refer to:

- Alfred Terry (1827–1890), Union Army major general
- Henry Dwight Terry (1812–1869), Union Army brigadier general
- James L. Terry (born 1957), U.S. Army lieutenant general
- Nathaniel Terry (1768–1844), Connecticut State Militia general
- Roy M. Terry (1915–1988), U.S. Air Force major general
- William Terry (congressman) (1824–1888), Confederate States Army brigadier general
- William R. Terry (1827–1897), Confederate States Army brigadier general

== See also ==
Major General Terry de la Mesa Allen Sr. (1888–1969), US Army general in World War II
