= Chaplain Corps =

Chaplain Corps might refer to:

- United States Army Chaplain Corps
- United States Navy Chaplain Corps
- United States Air Force Chaplain Corps

See also:

- Chaplain
- Military Chaplain
- Armed Forces Chaplains Board, the U.S. board made up of the three Chiefs of Chaplains and three active-duty Deputy Chiefs of Chaplains of the Army, Navy, and Air Force
