= General Albert =

General Albert may refer to:

- Duke John Albert of Mecklenburg (1857–1920), Prussian Army general of cavalry
- John F. Albert (1915–1989), U.S. Air Force brigadier general
- Joseph Jean-Baptiste Albert (1771–1822), French Army general de division (major general)
- Charles Frederick Albert, Margrave of Brandenburg-Schwedt (1705–1762), Prussian Army lieutenant general
