= Edwin R. Chess =

United States Air Force general (1913–2000)

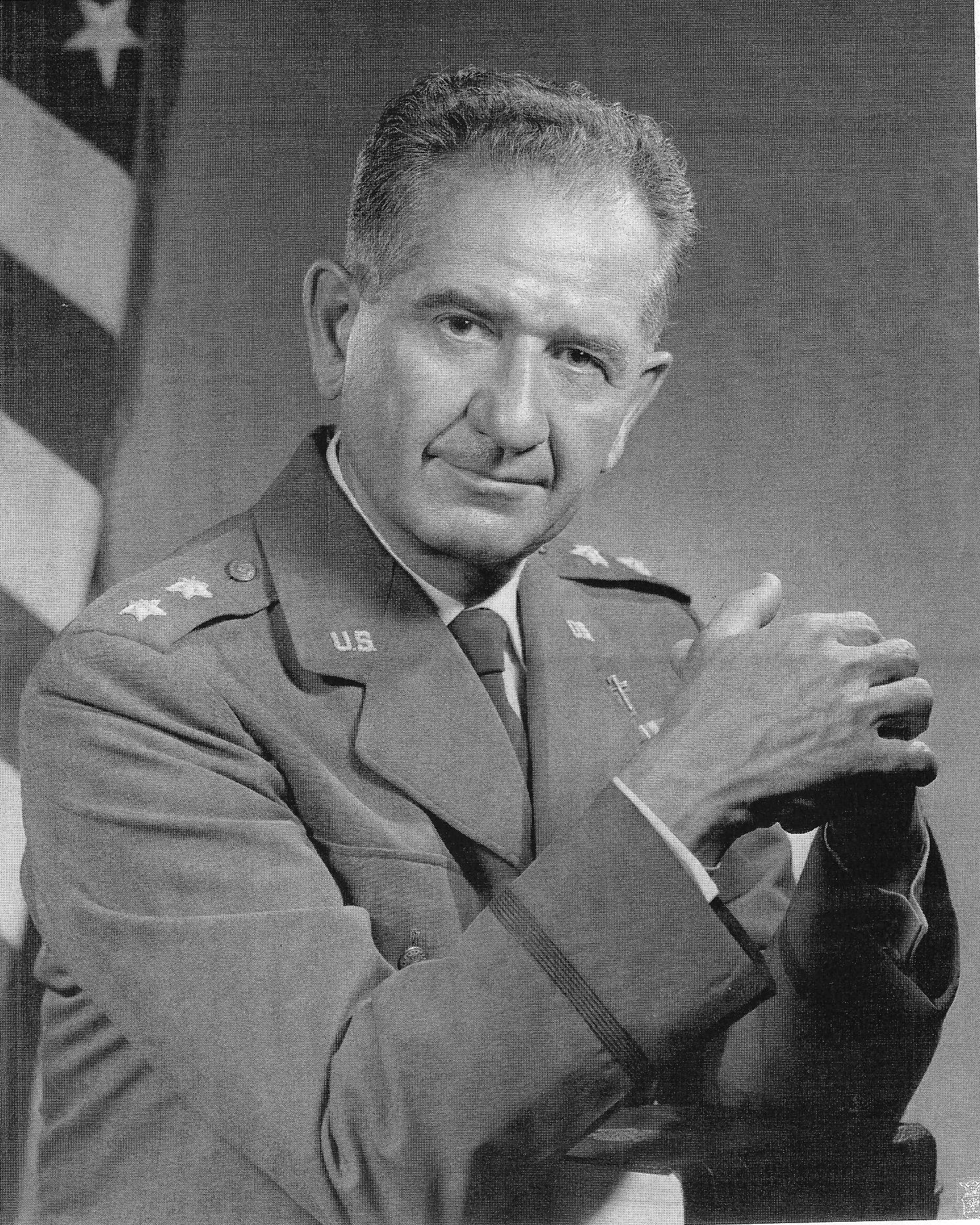
- Born: February 12, 1913; Chicago, Illinois, U.S.
- Died: June 12, 2000 (aged 87); San Antonio, Texas, U.S.
- Military career
- Allegiance: United States
- Branch: United States Air Force
- Rank: Major general
- Commands: Chief of Chaplains of the United States Air Force

Edwin Ralph Chess (February 12, 1913 – June 12, 2000) was a major general and Chief of Chaplains of the United States Air Force.

== Early life ==
He was born Edwin R. Czeslawski in Chicago, Illinois, in 1913 to Anna Zdonek and Mieczyslaw "Charles" Czeslawski. He attended Saint Mary of the Lake Seminary and DePaul University. He was ordained a Roman Catholic priest on April 3, 1937. In 1962, he was given the title of monsignor by Pope John XXIII.

== Career ==
Chess was originally commissioned an officer in the United States Army Reserve in 1942. He would serve in World War II with the 47th Bombardment Group, the 57th Bombardment Wing and the Twelfth Air Force. In 1946, he was released from active duty.

Edwin's brother Technical Sergeant Raymond Czeslawski was killed when the bomber in which he was a top turret gunner was downed by flak in Germany on May 8, 1944.

In 1948, Chess was recalled to active duty as a member of the United States Air Force. During the Korean War, he served with the 67th Tactical Reconnaissance Wing and the Fifth Air Force.

Later in his career, Chess was named Command Chaplain of the U.S. Air Force Security Service before becoming Deputy Chief of Chaplains of the United States Air Force in 1962. He was promoted to Chief of Chaplains and achieved the rank of major general in 1966. Chess remained Chief of Chaplains until his retirement in 1970.

Awards he received include the Bronze Star Medal, the Air Medal and the Air Force Commendation Medal with two oak leaf clusters.

Chess died in 2000 at the Brooke Army Medical Center in San Antonio, Texas. He had Parkinson's disease.

Military offices
Preceded by Robert P. Taylor	Deputy Chief of Chaplains of the United States Air Force; 1962–1966	Succeeded by William L. Clark
Preceded by Robert P. Taylor	Chief of Chaplains of the United States Air Force; 1966–1970	Succeeded by Roy M. Terry
