= Pearl River Community College =

Public college in Poplarville, Mississippi, US

Coordinates: 30.844289°N 89.543112°W

- Type: Public community college
- Academic affiliations: Space-grant
- President: Adam Breerwood
- Location: Poplarville, Mississippi, United States
- Colors: Maroon & Gold
- Mascot: Wildcats
- Website: http://www.prcc.edu

Pearl River Community College is a public community college in Poplarville, Mississippi. It was founded as Pearl River County Agricultural High School in 1909 and became the first junior college in Mississippi in 1921.

Residents of Hancock, Forrest, Jefferson Davis, Lamar, Marion, and Pearl River counties are in the college's service area.

== History ==
Pearl River County Agricultural High School (PRCAHS) was the result of the Mississippi Agricultural High School Law of 1908, making it the nation's first state-funded system of agricultural high schools. The law was found to be in violation of the separate but equal clause in the state's constitution by the state's Supreme Court late in 1909 when no equal opportunity was offered for the state's African-American children. The overturned law caused all but three of the twenty original agricultural high schools in the state to close, since state funding was no longer available. Pearl River County citizens came to the school's rescue, however, when private citizens secured a loan from a local bank to fund the school until the Mississippi Legislature could pass a new law which made opportunity for both races.

Classes began on September 8, 1909 under the direction of Professor T.M. Kelly. The entire boarding high school was located in one three-story building erected on 20 acres (81,000 m^{2}) of land on the edge of the county's seat, Poplarville. Classrooms and the cafeteria was located on the building's first floor, while the girls' dormitory occupied the second floor and the boys' dormitory occupied the third floor.

PRCAHS, under the supervision of James Andrew Huff, added freshman college classes to the curriculum to the school in 1921-22, making Pearl River College the first 2-year public institution in Mississippi. Pearl River College continued to lead the way by the addition of sophomore classes in 1925-26.

Pearl River College has since expanded to include four locations, the main campus in Poplarville, the Forrest County Center and Lowery Woodall Advanced Technology Center in Hattiesburg, MS, and the Hancock Center in Waveland, MS.

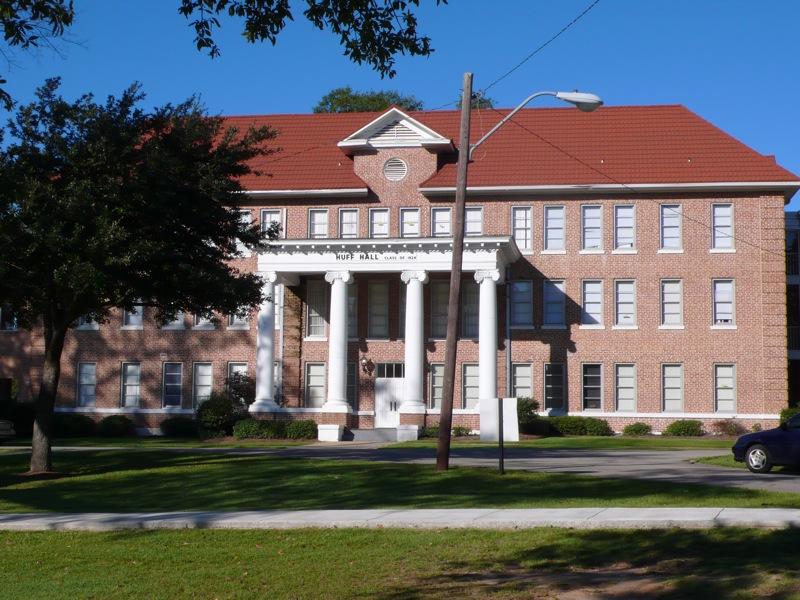
Huff Hall at Pearl River Community College

In August 2005, PRCC's Poplarville campus suffered an estimated $40–50 million in damage at the hand of Hurricane Katrina. This included severe structural damage to the auditorium wing of Moody Hall, the state's oldest instructional building on a junior college campus, and M. R. White Coliseum, the college's sports arena. Both the auditorium wing of Moody Hall and the entire sports arena were razed for student safety. A new M. R. White Coliseum was built on the same site, and the Ethel Holden Brownstone Center for the Arts was built to replace Moody Hall Auditorium. Most of the roofs on campus had to be replaced due to the storm, and many buildings had to undergo extensive mold remediation. The Hancock Center, on the Gulf Coast, was completely gutted by the massive tidal surge. The main campus was shut down for three weeks due to damages and the Hancock Center was shut down for four weeks.

== Residential facilities ==
The school has the following residential facilities:

For men: New Men's Dorm, Hancock Hall, Huff Hall, Lamar Hall, Marion Hall, and Pearl River Hall.

For women: New Women's Dorm, Forrest Hall, Holden Hall, Lamar Hall, and Moody Hall.

== Athletics ==
Pearl River's athletic teams are called the Wildcats, and the football team won four straight Mississippi Association of Community & Junior Colleges (MACJC) championships (2003, 2004, 2005, 2006) since head coach Tim Hatten took over the program in 2002. Pearl River also won the 2004 National Championship of the National Junior College Athletic Association (NJCAA) with the help of three NJCAA All-Americans, including wide receiver Larry Brackins, who was selected 155th overall by the NFL's Tampa Bay Buccaneers in the 2005 NFL draft; quarterback Jimmy Oliver, and offensive lineman Matt Lott. PRCC played for the 2006 NJCAA title in the Pilgrim's Pride Bowl Classic in Mt. Pleasant, Tex., but lost to Blinn College (Tex.) 19-6.

Brackins was a member of the Philadelphia Soul of the Arena Football League, and the practice squad for the NFL New York Jets. While former Wildcat receiver Donavan Morgan played with the AFL's Chicago Rush franchise after brief NFL stints with the New York Jets, Houston Texans, and Buffalo Bills. Larry Kendrick, Brackins' 2003 Wildcat teammate, signed on with the Ole Miss Rebels following the one-year stint at Pearl River and was an NJCAA All-American as a wide receiver and a defensive back, as well as being named the NJCAA's Male Athlete of the Year in 2003.

PRCC's 2006 state title marked its 19th in school history, which is a record for Mississippi community colleges. Oliver guided the Wildcats to their 2004 and 2005 titles and earned NJCAA "Offensive Player of the Year" honors both seasons, including All-American accolades. Oliver played two seasons with Jackson State University, guiding the Tigers to the 2007 SWAC championship.

Pearl River won four MACJC state championships during the 2003-2004 school year in football, men's basketball, women's soccer, and baseball. PRCC also won the 2005 MACJC women's soccer championship.

== Notable alumni ==
- Jeramey Anderson, politician
- Larry Brackins, professional football player
- Jimmy Buffett, singer-songwriter
- Demetrius Byrd, professional football player
- William Leon Clark, Deputy Chief of Chaplains of the United States Air Force
- J. P. Compretta, politician
- Cornelius Griffin, professional football player
- Rhyne Hughes, professional baseball player
- Donovan Morgan, professional football player
- James Singleton, professional basketball player
