= Roy M. Terry =

United States Air Force general

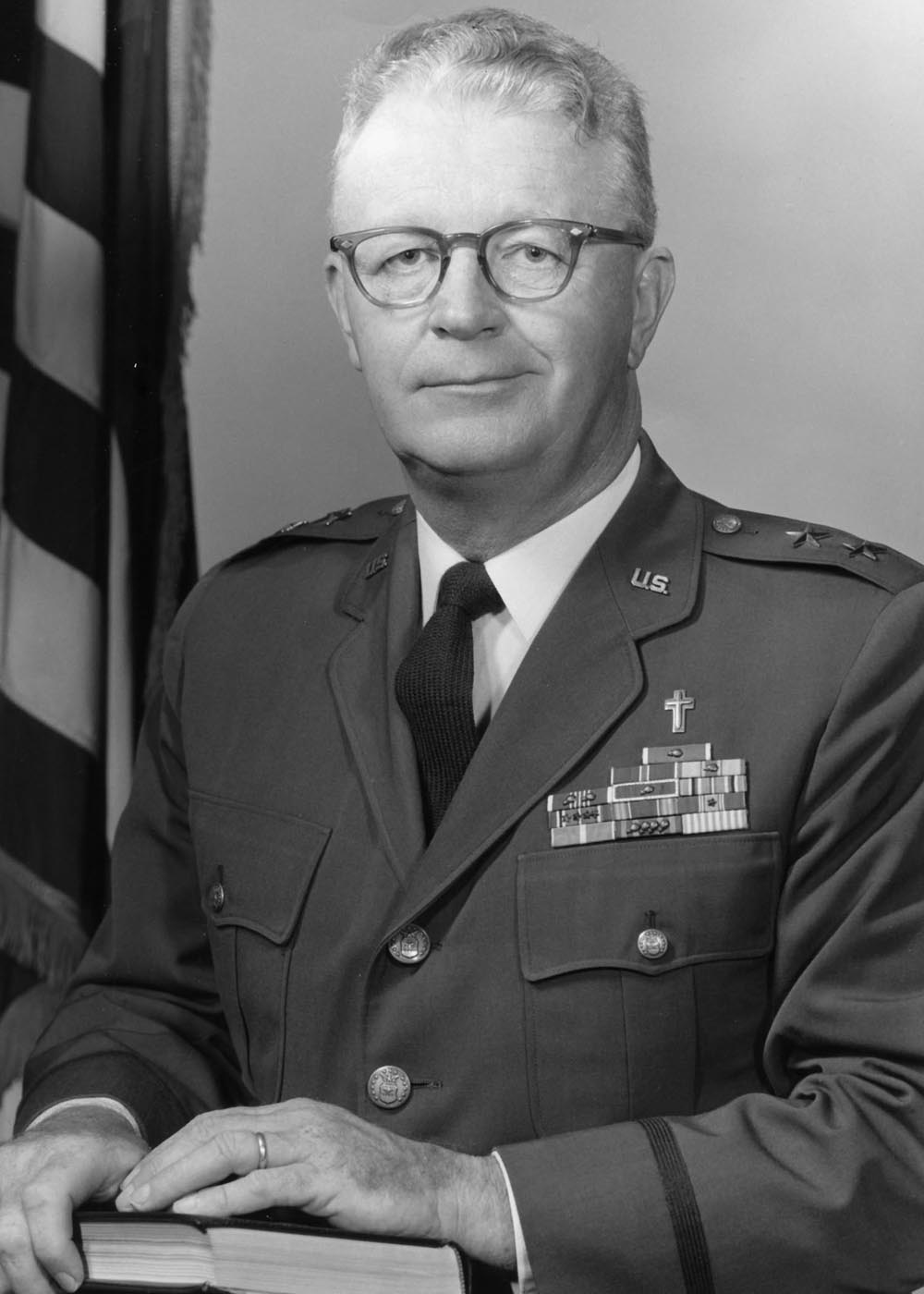
- Born: July 15, 1915; Brooklyn, New York, U.S.
- Died: May 12, 1988 (aged 72); Melbourne Beach, Florida, U.S.
- Military career
- Allegiance: United States
- Branch: United States Air Force
- Service years: 1942–1946, 1949–1974
- Rank: Major General
- Commands: Chief of Chaplains of the United States Air Force
- Conflicts: World War II
- Awards: Legion of Merit (2); Bronze Star Medal

Roy Morton Terry Jr. (July 15, 1915 – May 12, 1988) was Chief of Chaplains of the United States Air Force.

== Early life and education ==
Born in Brooklyn, New York, Terry later moved to Danbury, Connecticut. He attended Syracuse University, where he earned three varsity letters in men's soccer and served as co-captain of the 1936 team. Terry graduated with a B.S. degree in 1937. He then became an ordained Methodist pastor, working in Georgetown, Connecticut from 1939 to 1942. While there, he completed his education at the Yale Divinity School (B.D. 1942).

== Career ==
Terry originally joined the United States Army Air Forces in July 1942. During World War II, he served in the European Theatre. Following the war, he left active duty in January 1946.

Recalled to active duty in June 1949 as a United States Air Force member, he was stationed at Maxwell Air Force Base. He was later assigned to Clark Air Base in the Philippines.

Later assignments included serving at The Pentagon, Headquarters Fifth Air Force, Headquarters Aerospace Defense Command, and the United States Air Force Academy. He served as Deputy Chief of Chaplains of the United States Air Force from March 1969 until July 1970, after which he was promoted to Chief of Chaplains with the rank of major general. Terry held this position until his retirement on August 1, 1974.

Awards he received include the Legion of Merit with oak leaf cluster, the Bronze Star Medal, the Air Force Commendation Medal with oak leaf cluster, the Army Commendation Medal with two oak leaf clusters, and the Distinguished Unit Citation with oak leaf cluster.

== Later life ==
In 1974, Terry moved to Melbourne Beach, Florida. From 1982 to 1987, he was a minister at the Community Chapel of Melbourne Beach. Terry died on May 12, 1988.

In 1992, the Roy M. Terry Center for Christian Fellowship at the Community Chapel was dedicated in his honor. Terry and his wife Emily Parks Terry (September 29, 1918 – December 21, 1994) were interred at Arlington National Cemetery on June 22, 1995.

Military offices
Preceded by William L. Clark	Deputy Chief of Chaplains of the United States Air Force; 1969–1970	Succeeded by John F. Albert
Preceded by Edwin R. Chess	Chief of Chaplains of the United States Air Force; 1970–1974	Succeeded by Henry J. Meade
