= Robert P. Taylor =

United States Air Force general

Robert P Taylor
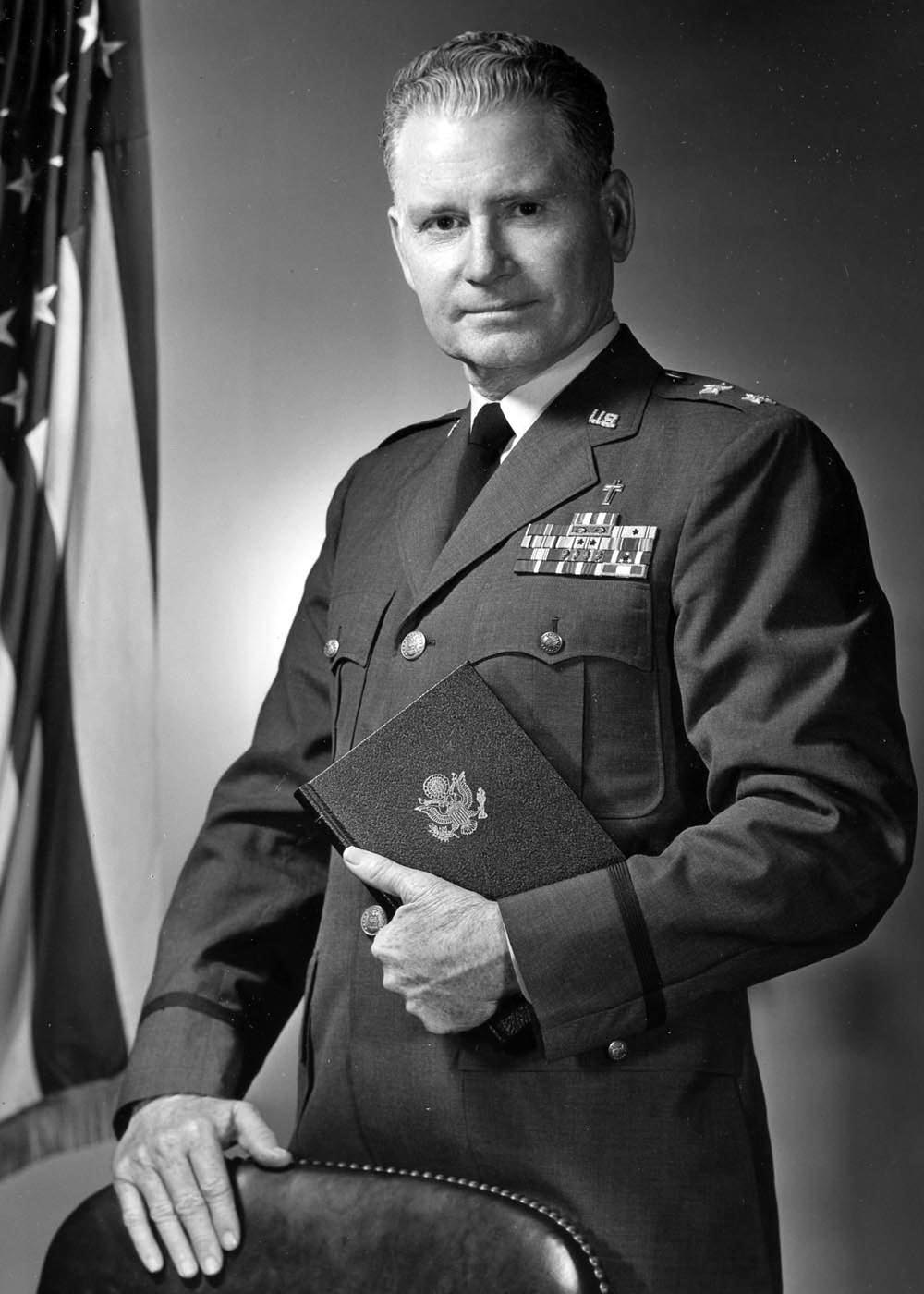
- Major General Robert Preston Taylor; 3rd Chief of Chaplains of the United States Air Force
- Born: April 11, 1909; Henderson, Texas, U.S.
- Died: February 1, 1997 (aged 87); Arlington, Texas, U.S.
- Military career
- Allegiance: United States
- Branch: United States Army; United States Air Force
- Service years: 1940–1966
- Rank: Major General
- Commands: U.S. Air Force Chaplain Corps
- Conflicts: World War II
- Awards: Silver Star; Bronze Star Medal; Presidential Unit Citation

Chaplain (Major General) Robert Preston Taylor, USAF (April 11, 1909 – February 1, 1997) was an American military officer who served as the 3rd Chief of Chaplains of the United States Air Force. A graduate of Baylor University in Waco, Texas, he notably served as a chaplain during World War II and was a prisoner of war and survivor of the Bataan Death March. He began his tenure as chief of chaplains on September 1, 1962, and served until his retirement on August 1, 1966. Taylor previously served as Deputy Chief of Chaplains of the United States Air Force from August 1958 to September 1962.

Born in Henderson, Texas, Taylor earned a B.A. degree from Baylor University in 1933. He then entered the Southwestern Baptist Theological Seminary, completing an M.Th. degree in 1936 and a D.Th. degree in 1939. Taylor served as pastor of the South Fort Worth Baptist Church until becoming a U.S. Army chaplain in September 1940. After his release from captivity in 1945, he was reassigned to the U.S. Army Air Forces in January 1946. Taylor became part of the new U.S. Air Force the following year.

Military offices
Preceded by Terence P. Finnegan	Deputy Chief of Chaplains of the United States Air Force; 1958–1962	Succeeded by Edwin R. Chess
Preceded by Terence P. Finnegan	Chief of Chaplains of the United States Air Force; 1962–1966	Succeeded by Edwin R. Chess
