= 1936 Penn State Nittany Lions men's soccer team =

Penn State Nittany Lions men's soccer 1936 season

1936 Penn State Nittany Lions men's soccer

Claimed, ISFA National Champion
- Conference: Eastern Intercollegiate Soccer Football Association
- Record: 6–0–2 ( Eastern Intercollegiate Soccer Football Association)
- Head coach: William Jeffrey (11th season)
- Home stadium: New Beaver Field

The 1936 Penn State Nittany Lions men's soccer team represented Pennsylvania State University during the 1936 season playing in the Eastern Intercollegiate Soccer League. It was the program's 26th season fielding a men's varsity soccer team. The 1936 season is William Jeffrey's 11th year at the helm.

== Background ==
The 1936 season was the Nittany Lions' 26th season as a varsity soccer program, and their 11th season playing as a part of the Intercollegiate Soccer Football Association. The team was led by 11th year head coach, William Jeffrey, who had previously served as the head coach for the semi-professional soccer team, Altoona Works.

At the end of the 1936 season Penn State was given an "outstanding" rating by the Eastern Intercollegiate Soccer Football Association along with Princeton, Syracuse and West Chester. The 1936 season marked the first time the Intercollegiate Soccer Football Association did not select a champion.

== Schedule ==
Date Time, TV	Rank^{#}	Opponent^{#}	Result	Record	Site (Attendance) City, State
Regular season
October 10; 1:00 p.m.		Bucknell	W 6–0	1–0–0	New Beaver Field; State College, PA
October 17; 2:30 p.m.		Gettysburg	W 8–0	2–0–0	New Beaver Field; State College, PA
October 24; 1:00 p.m.		Lafayette	W 2–0	3–0–0	New Beaver Field; State College, PA
October 31		at Syracuse; Rivalry	T 4–4	3–0–1	Archbold Stadium; Syracuse, NY
November 7; 1:00 p.m.		Western Maryland	T 3–3	3–0–2	New Beaver Field; State College, PA
November 11; 1:00 p.m.		at Yale	W 1–0	4–0–2	New Haven, CT
November 21; 10:00 a.m.		Temple	W 5–0	5–0–2	New Beaver Field; State College, PA
November 21		at Navy	W 3–0	6–0–2	Annapolis, MD
*Non-conference game. ^{#}Rankings from United Soccer Coaches. (#) Tournament seedings in parentheses.
