= Community Chapel of Melbourne Beach =

- U.S. National Register of Historic Places
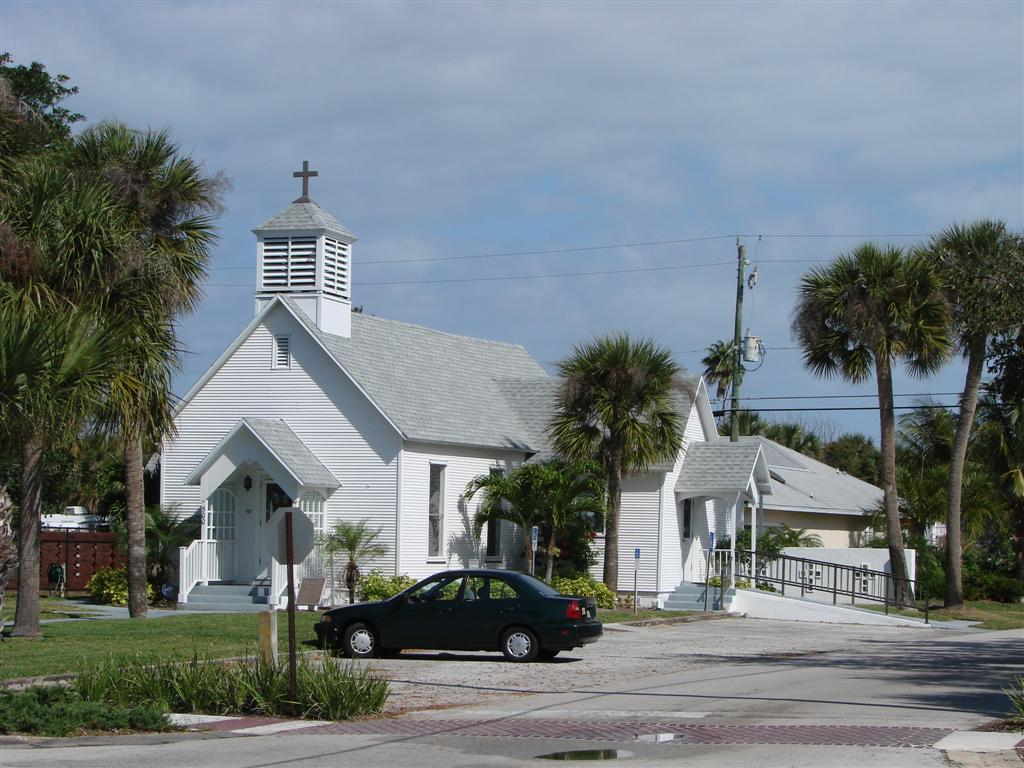

- Location within Florida Location within the United States
- Location: Melbourne Beach, Florida
- Coordinates: 28°4′6″N 80°33′49″W
- NRHP reference No.: 92000505
- Added to NRHP: May 14, 1992

The Community Chapel of Melbourne Beach is a historic chapel at 501 Ocean Avenue, Melbourne Beach, Florida, United States. The local residents built the chapel in 1892 & made it non-denominational, which it remains today. On May 14, 1992, it was added to the U.S. National Register of Historic Places.

== History ==
Prior to constructing this chapel, the community used the home of local resident Grace Cummings, called Myrtle Cottage, as the place of worship. For many years, mainland ministers held seasonal services at the chapel. The hurricane of 1924 significantly damaged the foundation of the chapel and services did not resume until repairs were complete in December 1927. In 1929, the trustees hired Reverend Walter Lamphear as the first minister. Dr. Vincent Booth succeeded Lamphear as the minister from 1939-1943. In 1942, extensive upgrades to the chapel doubled the seating capacity from 70 to 140. Also, the size of the chancel was increased and transepts were added on the east and west sides. Chaplain Roy M. Terry, a retired Air Force Chief of Chaplains, served as minister from 1982 to 1988 and instituted year-round worship services. On January 10, 1992, the congregation dedicated the Roy Terry Center for Christian Fellowship in his honor. Chaplain John Rasberry also served as the minister. In July 2000, retired Air Force Chaplain John Secret became minister and he serves in this position today. In 2004, the Terry Center received major damage from the series of hurricanes that hit the area. In September 2005, the congregation rededicated the Center upon completion of renovations.
