= Bobby V. Page =

United States Air Force general

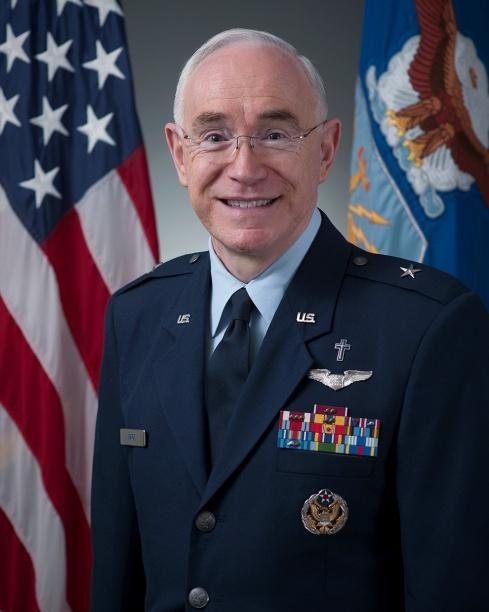
- Deputy Chief of Chaplains of the United States Air Force
- Born: 12 December 1951 (age 74)
- Military career
- Allegiance: United States of America
- Branch: United States Air Force
- Service years: 1973–1980; 1989–2016
- Rank: Brigadier General
- Commands: Deputy Chief of Chaplains of the United States Air Force

Bobby Vincent Page (born 12 December 1951) is a retired Brigadier General in the United States Air Force who served as the Deputy Chief of Chaplains of the United States Air Force from 2012 to 2016. In that position he served as the second most senior chaplain in the United States Air Force, the Deputy to the Chief of Chaplains of the United States Air Force, and a member of the Armed Forces Chaplains Board.

Page was nominated for promotion to brigadier general on 10 May 2012, and later promoted to that rank and appointed to his current position on 2 August 2012. He retired on 1 January 2016.

== Life and works ==
Page joined the Air Force in 1974 prior to ordination as a minister, serving for six years as a KC-135 aircraft navigator. He received his commission after graduation from the Reserve Officers Training Corps (ROTC) at Louisiana State University in 1973.

He left active duty to attend Southwestern Baptist Theological Seminary, and was re-commissioned as a chaplain in the United States Air National Guard. He served with the Air National Guard in Arkansas and Georgia, while he served as the pastor of churches in those States, later joining the Air Reserves in South Carolina.

Page returned to active duty in July 1989, serving in a number of assignments, including an assignment in Baghdad, Iraq, where he established the first USAF chaplain ministry effort at the Baghdad International Airport, before his promotion to brigadier general and appointment as USAF deputy chief of chaplains.

== Education ==
Page's official U.S. Air Force on-line bio lists his educational background as follows:

- 1973 Bachelor of Arts in history, Louisiana State University, Baton Rouge, La.
- 1975 Undergraduate Navigator Training, Mather AFB, Calif.
- 1978 Master of Public Administration, Golden Gate University, San Francisco, Calif.
- 1983 Master of Divinity, Southwestern Baptist Theological Seminary, Fort Worth, Texas
- 1990 Squadron Officer School by correspondence
- 1994 Air Command and Staff College by seminar
- 1997 Air Force Institute of Technology, Northern Baptist Theological Seminary, Lombard, Ill.
- 1999 Doctor of Ministry, Northern Baptist Theological Seminary, Lombard, Ill.
- 2001 Air War College by seminar

== Assignments ==
- 1. May 1974 - March 1975, Undergraduate Navigator Training, Mather AFB, Calif.
- 2. March 1975 - June 1975, KC-135 Upgrade Training, Castle AFB, Calif.
- 3. July 1975 - January 1980, Navigator, Instructor Navigator, Standards and Evaluation Senior Navigator, 307th Air Refueling Group, Travis AFB, Calif.
- 4. March 1985 - December 1986, Chaplain, 188th Fighter Wing, AR Air National Guard, Fort Smith, Ark.
- 5. January 1987 - June 1989, Chaplain, Air Force Reserve, 20th Fighter Wing, Shaw AFB, S.C.
- 6. July 1989 - July 1993, Chaplain, 475th Air Base Wing, Yokota Air Base, Japan
- 7. July 1993 - July 1996, Senior Chaplain to Tech Training Airmen, 37th Training Wing, Lackland AFB, Texas
- 8. August 1996 - June 1997, Student: Air Force Institute of Technology, Northern Baptist Theological Seminary, Lombard, Ill. (Faith and Character Formation in Young, Single Adults)
- 9. June 1997 - July 2000, Chief of Program Development, Office of the Command Chaplain, Air Education and Training Command, Randolph AFB, Texas
- 10. July 2000 - July 2003, Wing Chaplain, McGuire AFB, N.J.
  - a. September - December 2000, Wing Chaplain, Deployed to Prince Sultan Air Base (PSAB), Saudi Arabia
  - b. February - July 2003, Wing Chaplain, Deployed to PSAB and Baghdad International Airport, Iraq
- 11. August 2003 - May 2004, Strategic and Professional Programs Officer, HQ USAF/HC, Bolling AFB, D.C.
- 12. May 2004 - June 2006, Chief, Plans and Programs Division, HQ USAF/HC, Bolling AFB, D.C.
- 13. June 2006 - June 2009, Command Chaplain, Air Combat Command, Langley AFB, Va.
- 14. June 2009 - August 2012, Command Chaplain, Air Education and Training Command, Randolph AFB, Texas
- 15. August 2012 – October 2015, Deputy Chief of Chaplains of the United States Air Force

== Awards and decorations ==
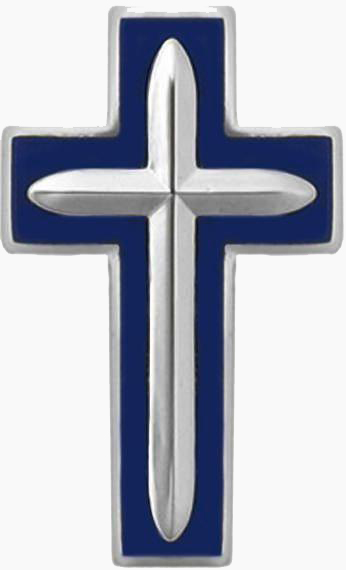

Badge	Air Force Christian Chaplain Badge		
Badge	Basic Air Force Navigator Badge		
1st Row	Air Force Distinguished Service Medal		Legion of Merit with two bronze oak leaf clusters
2nd Row	Meritorious Service Medal with three oak leaf clusters	Air Force Commendation Medal with two oak leaf clusters	Air Force Outstanding Unit Award with "V" device and silver oak leaf cluster
3rd Row	Combat Readiness Medal	National Defense Service Medal with one bronze service star	Armed Forces Expeditionary Medal
4th Row	Global War on Terrorism Expeditionary Medal	Global War on Terrorism Service Medal	Air Force Overseas Service Ribbon - Long Tour
5th Row	Air Force Longevity Service Award Ribbon with silver and two bronze oak leaf clusters	Small Arms Expert Marksmanship Ribbon	Air Force Training Ribbon
Badge	Headquarters Air Force badge		

== Effective dates of promotion ==
- Second Lieutenant 10 August 1973
- First Lieutenant 10 February 1976
- Captain 10 February 1978
- Separated from Active Duty 29 January 1980
- Returned to Active Duty 4 July 1989
- Captain (Revised) 15 March 1984
- Major 1 June 1992
- Lieutenant Colonel 1 June 1999
- Colonel 1 August 2004
- Brigadier General 2 August 2012
