= Charles C. Baldwin =

United States Air Force general and Chief of Chaplains of the United States Air Force

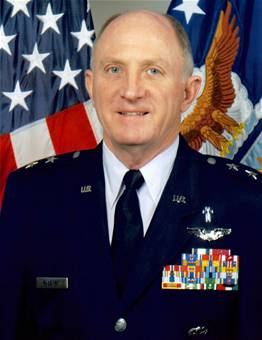
- Born: April 7, 1947 (age 79)
- Military career
- Allegiance: United States of America
- Branch: United States Air Force
- Service years: 1969–2008
- Rank: Major general
- Commands: Chief of Chaplains of the United States Air Force; Deputy Chief of Chaplains of the United States Air Force

Charles Cread Baldwin (born April 7, 1947) is a former Chief of Chaplains of the United States Air Force.

== Biography ==
A native of New Haven, Connecticut, Baldwin is an ordained Southern Baptist pastor. He is a graduate of the Southern Baptist Theological Seminary. Baldwin is married to Anne, with whom he has three children and nine grandchildren. Baldwin was the first, and to date the only Air Force Chief of Chaplains who had been a rated air force pilot.

== Career ==
Baldwin graduated from United States Air Force Academy in 1969. He would go on to serve in the Vietnam War and the Gulf War. Baldwin served as an Air Force pilot before attending seminary and changing career fields to chaplain. He flew the EC-121 Warning Star, then later, the HH-53 "Super Jolly" as a rescue helicopter pilot. Other assignments he held include serving at Headquarters, United States Air Forces in Europe and North American Aerospace Defense Command. Baldwin served as Deputy Chief of Chaplains of the United States Air Force from 2001 to 2004, when he became Chief of Chaplains with the rank of major general. His retirement was effective as of July 1, 2008.

== Awards and military decorations ==
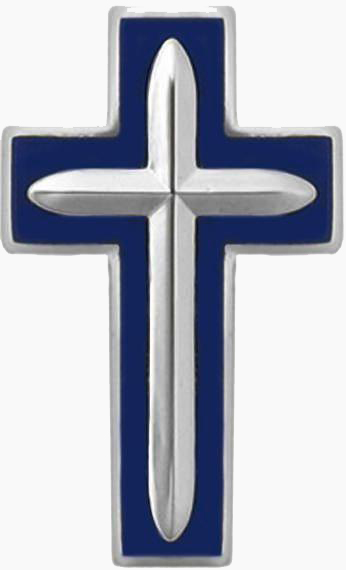

| Badge | Air Force Christian Chaplain Badge | | | |
| Badge | US Air Force Basic Aviator Badge | | | |
| 1st Row | Air Force Distinguished Service Medal with one bronze oak leaf cluster | Legion of Merit with oak leaf cluster | Distinguished Flying Cross with oak leaf cluster | Bronze Star Medal |
| 2nd Row | Meritorious Service Medal with silver oak leaf cluster | Air Medal with three oak leaf clusters | Air Force Commendation Medal | Air Force Outstanding Unit Award with Valor device and oak leaf cluster |
| 3rd Row | Air Force Organizational Excellence Award | National Defense Service Medal with two bronze service stars | Armed Forces Expeditionary Medal | Vietnam Service Medal with three service stars |
| 4th Row | Southwest Asia Service Medal with two service stars | Global War on Terrorism Service Medal | Humanitarian Service Medal | Air Force Overseas Ribbon - Short with two oak leaf clusters |
| 5th Row | Air Force Overseas Ribbon - Long | Air Force Longevity Service Award Ribbon with silver and three bronze oak leaf clusters | Small Arms Expert Marksmanship Ribbon | Air Force Training Ribbon with oak leaf cluster |
| 6th Row | Vietnam Gallantry Cross Unit Citation | Vietnam Campaign Medal | Kuwait Liberation Medal (Saudi Arabia) | Kuwait Liberation Medal (Kuwait) |
| Badge | Basic Parachutist Badge | | | |

Military offices
| Preceded by Lorraine K. Potter | Chief of Chaplains of the United States Air Force; 2004–2008 | Succeeded by Cecil R. Richardson |
