= Augustus F. Gearhard =

United States Air Force general and Roman Catholic priest

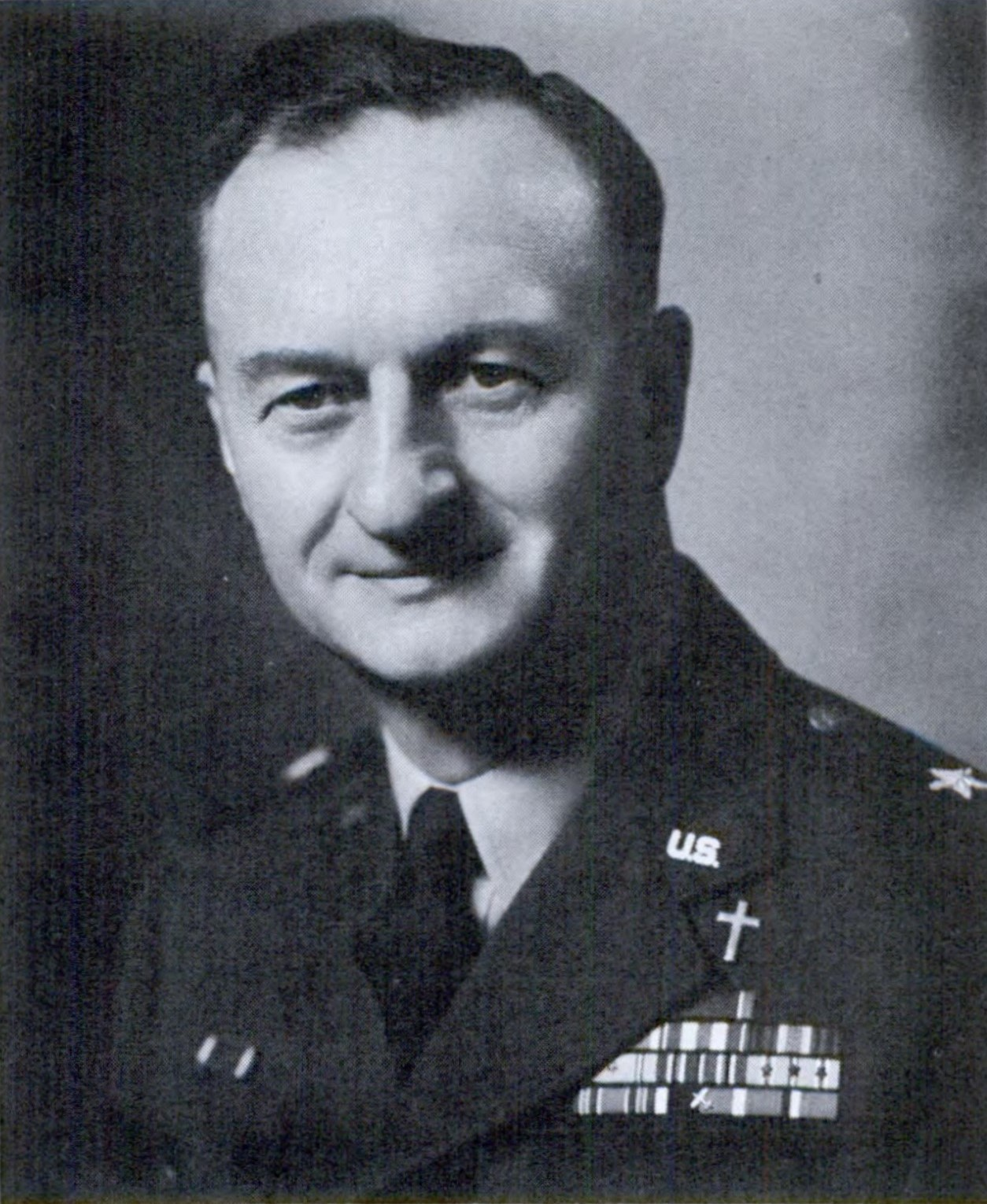
- Born: April 18, 1893; Milwaukee, Wisconsin, US
- Died: March 19, 1974 (aged 80)
- Military career
- Allegiance: United States of America
- Branch: United States Air Force
- Rank: Brigadier General
- Awards: Distinguished Service Cross; Silver Star; Legion of Merit (2)

Augustus Francis Gearhard (April 18, 1893 – March 19, 1974) was a brigadier general in the United States Air Force. He was a Roman Catholic priest at St. Michael's Parish and eventually St. Mary's Parish in Milwaukee. He was also the rector of the Fenwick Home for Boys.

Gearhard was born in Milwaukee, Wisconsin, in 1893. He attended St. Francis Seminary and was ordained in 1917. Gearhard died on March 19, 1974.

== Military career ==
Gearhard originally joined the United States Army in 1918 and was deployed overseas to take part in World War I. While serving with the 328th Infantry Regiment of the 82nd Infantry Division, Gearhard was awarded the Distinguished Service Cross, America's second-highest award for combat bravery. He received the medal for valor under fire during the St. Mihiel Offensive in September 1918 and the Meuse-Argonne Offensive the following month. He repeatedly braved artillery and other fire by crossing into no man's land to aid dead and dying soldiers, carrying them to safety.

It was reported that Gearhard was a witness to Sergeant Alvin York's Medal of Honor-earning action on October 8, 1918.

Returning with his division to the US, after post-war occupation duty, in June 1919, Gearhard was honorably discharged from federal service. He returned to Milwaukee to his pre-war post at St. Michael's Parish. The following year, he moved to become curate at St. Mary's Parish, also in Milwaukee. Then in 1924 he became rector of the Fenwick Home for Boys, also in Milwaukee. He remained here through the inter-war years.

In 1924, Gearhard rejoined the military. He was commissioned an Army Reserve captain in the Chaplain Corps on November 26, 1924. He served in the Army Reserve for the next 17 years, rising to the rank of lieutenant colonel.

Called to active duty in January 1942 during World War II he served with the V Fighter Command, the Fifth Air Force, and finally the Far East Air Force. His service with these formations was all in the Pacific Theater of the war.

In May 1945, Gearhard was one of two chaplains that conducted what was described as “One of the most unusual funeral services of the war." Gearhard and a fellow Army chaplain conducted a funeral service from 11,000 ft in the air. Their plane circled the crash site of the C-47 Skytrain Gremlin Special. They held services by radio relayed to the survivors as they circled the crash site.

Following the war he was named chaplain of the Air Defense Command. Gearhard transferred to the Air Force upon its establishment in 1947. In 1949 he was named chaplain of the United States Air Forces in Europe before becoming Deputy Chief of Chaplains of the United States Air Force in September 1950. He retired from the Air Force in 1953 and received a second award of the Legion of Merit upon his retirement.

== Later life and death ==
After retiring from his combined 30 years of military service, Gearhard returned to Milwaukee. He was pastor of St. Joseph's Parish in Waukesha, Wisconsin, for 18 years. He fully retired in 1971 and died of unknown causes at age 80 in 1974.

== Awards and decorations ==
Awards Gearhard received include the Distinguished Service Cross, the Silver Star, and the Legion of Merit with one oak leaf cluster. He was also entitled to several awards for service;

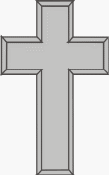

Badge	Chaplain's Badge (Christian)		
1st row	Distinguished Service Cross		
2nd row	Silver Star	Legion of Merit	World War I Victory Medal w/ three battle clasps
3rd row	Army of Occupation of Germany Medal	American Campaign Medal	Asiatic–Pacific Campaign Medal (w/ unknown number of campaign stars)
4th row	World War II Victory Medal	National Defense Service Medal	Air Force Longevity Service Award w/ 1 oak leaf cluster (indicating between 8 and 12 years of service in the USAF or USAAF)

=== Posthumous honors ===
In 2019, Gearhard was inducted into the 82nd Airborne Division Hall of Fame. As part of the second group of inductees, Gearhard was the first chaplain so honored.
