= David H. Cyr =

United States Air Force general

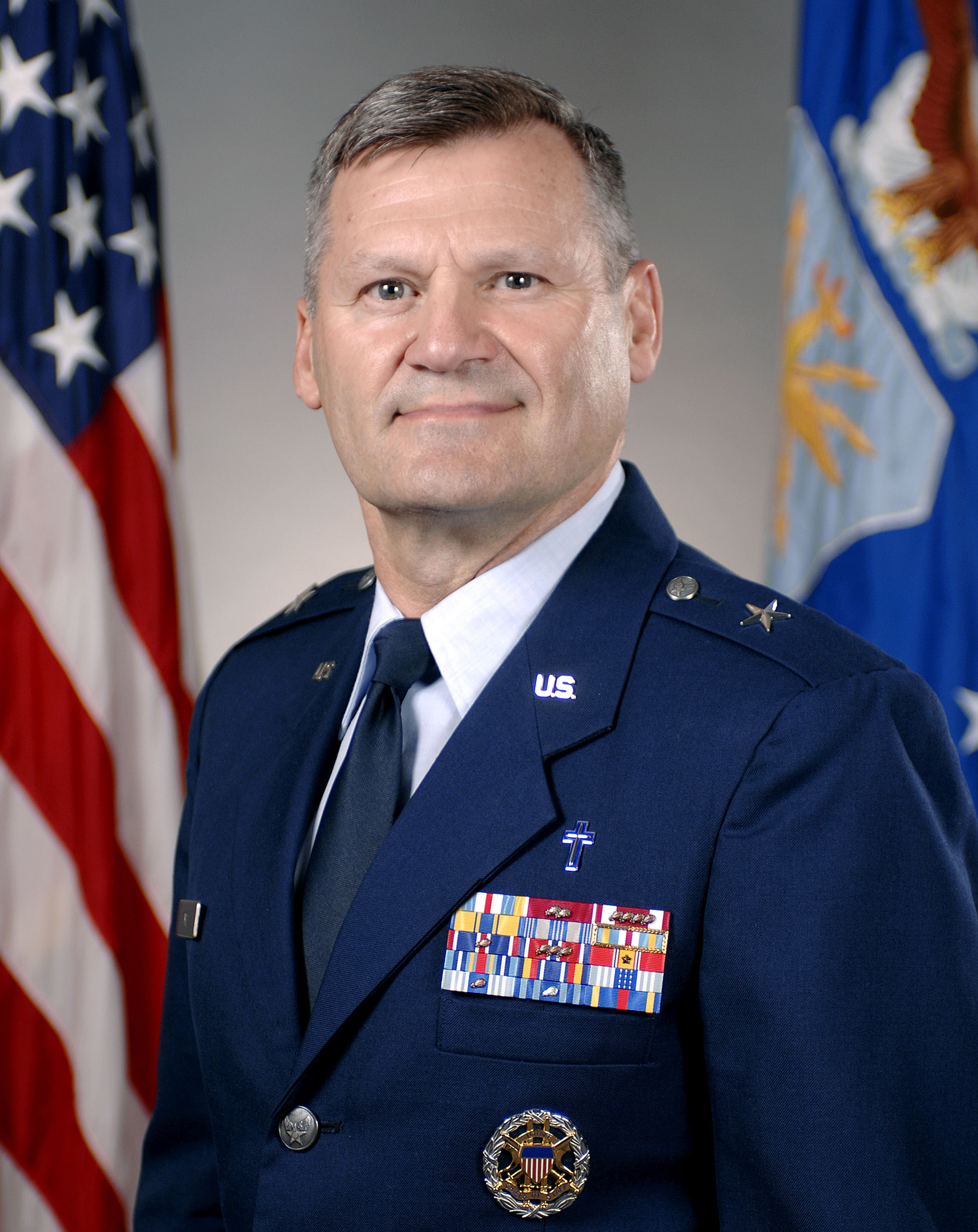
- Born: August 14, 1962 (age 64); Patten, Maine, U.S.
- Military career
- Allegiance: United States of America
- Branch: United States Air Force
- Service years: 1979–2011
- Rank: Brigadier general
- Commands: Deputy Chief of Chaplains of the United States Air Force

David Henry Cyr (born January 9, 1950) is a former Deputy Chief of Chaplains of the United States Air Force.

== Career ==
Cyr was born in Patten, Maine. He joined the United States Air Force as a Protestant chaplain in 1979. His assignments included Executive Office to the Chief of Chaplains from 1993 to 1995, Chaplain of the Joint Chiefs of Staff from 1998 to 2001, Command Chaplain of the United States Air Forces in Europe from 2001 to 2003 and Command Chaplain at Headquarters Air Combat Command from 2003 to 2006. He was named Deputy Chief of Chaplains and achieved the rank of brigadier general in 2008. Cyr remained Deputy Chief of Chaplains until 2011. He retired later that year.

Awards he received include the Defense Superior Service Medal, the Legion of Merit with two oak leaf clusters, the Meritorious Service Medal with silver oak leaf cluster, the Air Force Commendation Medal and the Air Force Achievement Medal.

== Education ==
- Master of Divinity – Bangor Theological Seminary
- Master of Science, national security strategy – National War College
