= Howard D. Stendahl =

United States Air Force general

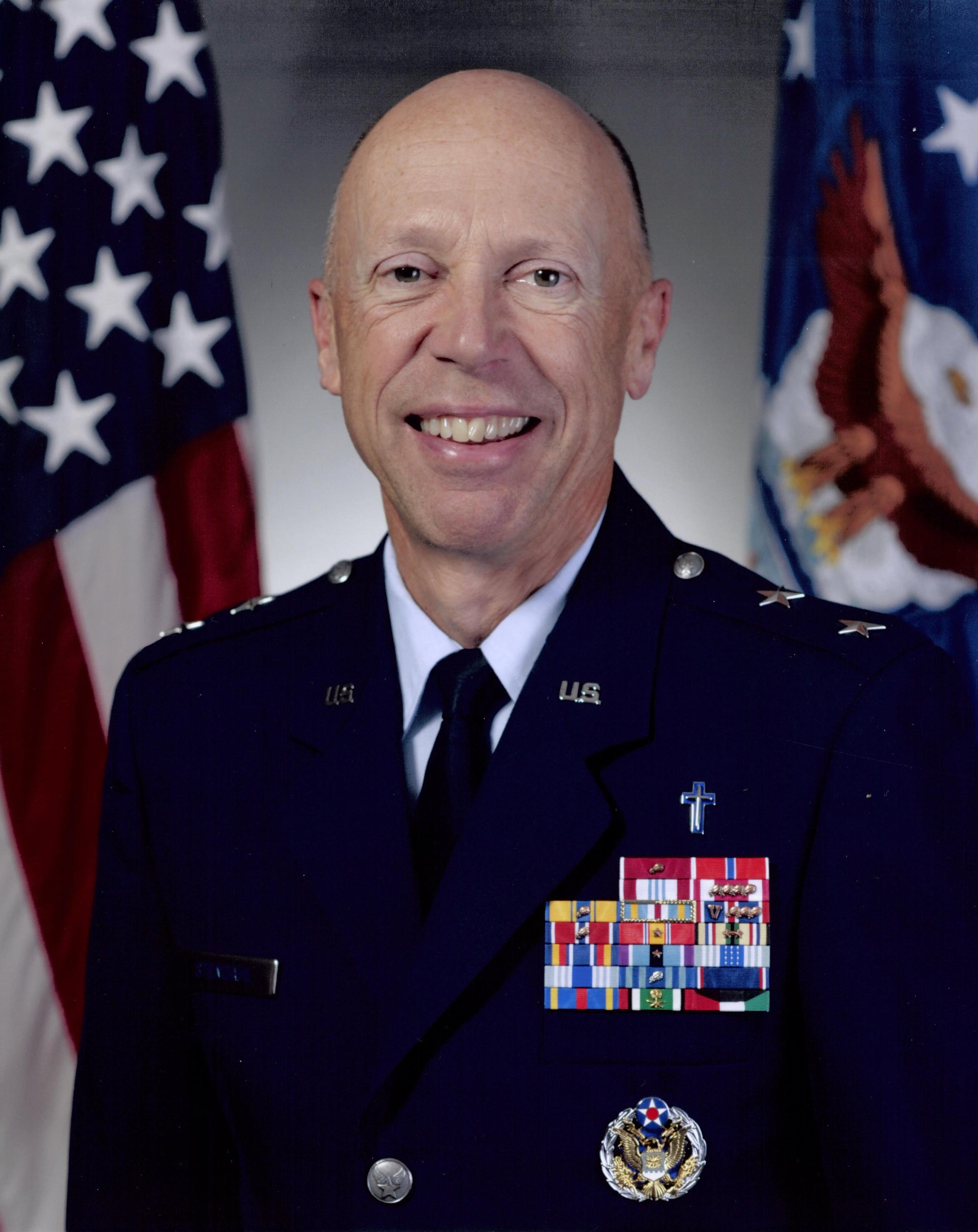
- As Chief of Chaplains of the United States Air Force.
- Born: August 1, 1951 (age 75); Saint Paul, Minnesota, U.S.
- Military career
- Allegiance: United States of America
- Branch: United States Air Force
- Service years: 1985–2015
- Rank: Major General

Howard Douglas Stendahl (born August 1, 1951) is the Chief of Chaplains of the United States Air Force, promoted to Major General with an effective date of August 2, 2012. He was officially promoted and installed as the Air Force Chief of Chaplains at a ceremony held at Bolling Air Force Base on August 31, 2012.

== Early life ==
Born and reared in Saint Paul, Minnesota, Stendahl was ordained in 1977 into the ministry of The American Lutheran Church now a part of the Evangelical Lutheran Church in America. He studied Clinical Pastoral Education and served as a parish pastor in Texas and Wisconsin before entering the Air Force Chaplain Service in 1985.

== Education ==
According to Stendahl's official U.S. Air Force bio, his education includes:

- 1973 Bachelor of Arts, Hamline University, St. Paul Minn
- 1977 Master of Divinity, Luther Theological Seminary, St. Paul Minn
- 1988 Squadron Officer School (Residence)
- 1994 Doctor of Ministry, Graduate Theological Foundation, South Bend Ind
- 1995 Air Command and Staff College (Residence)
- 2001 Air War College (Seminar)
- 2004 Master of Strategic Studies, Air War College (Residence)

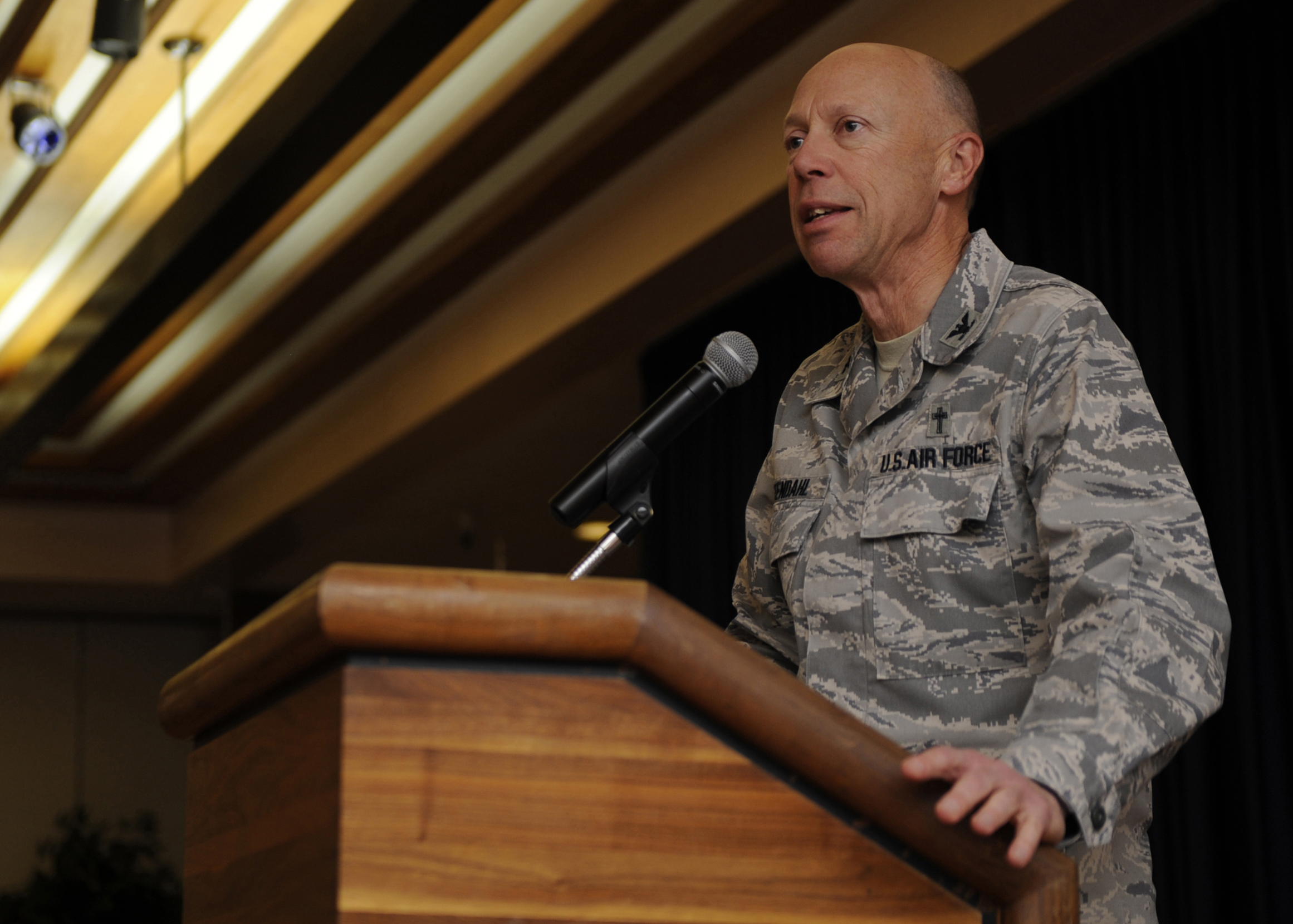
Chaplain Stendahl delivers the keynote address at the Mountainhome Air Force Base National Prayer Breakfast

== Military assignments ==
Stendahls's past assignments, prior to his promotion to brigadier general and assignment as U.S. Air Force deputy chief of chaplains, included:

- 1985 - Chaplain, Basic Military Training School, Permanent Party Chapel, Lackland AFB TX
- 1988 - Protestant Chaplain, Shaw AFB SC (deployed to Al Dhafra AB, UAE 1990-91)
- 1991 - Chaplain to Cadets, U.S. Air Force Academy, Colo.
- 1994 - Student, Air Command and Staff College, Maxwell AFB, Ala.
- 1995 - Senior Protestant Chaplain, Vandenberg AFB, Calif.
- 1997 - Command Staff Chaplain, U.S. European Command, Patch Barracks, Stuttgart-Vaihingen GE
- 1999 - Senior Staff Chaplain, HQ Air Force Recruiting Service, Randolph AFB, Texas
- 2002 - Wing Chaplain, Ellsworth AFB, S.D.
- 2003 - Student, Air War College, Maxwell AFB, Ala.
- 2004 - Director, USAF Chaplain Service Institute, Maxwell AFB, Ala.
- 2006 - Command Chaplain, Air Education and Training Command, Randolph AFB, Texas
- 2009 - Command Chaplain, Air Combat Command, Langley AFB, Va.

== Personal ==
In the 2024 United States presidential election, Stendahl endorsed Kamala Harris.

== Awards and honors ==
Stendahl's numerous military awards include:

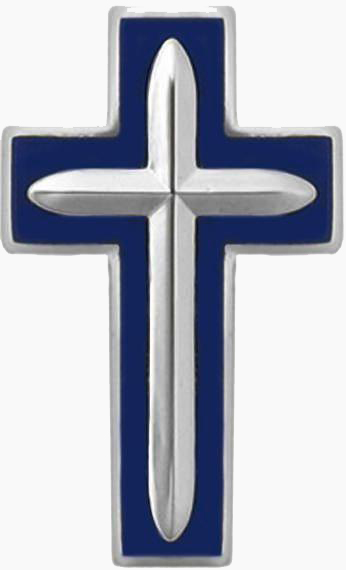

Badge	Air Force Christian Chaplain Badge		
1st row	Air Force Distinguished Service Medal	Legion of Merit with one bronze oak leaf cluster	
2nd row	Bronze Star	Defense Meritorious Service Medal	Meritorious Service Medal with four oak leaf clusters
3rd row	Air Force Commendation Medal with oak leaf cluster	Joint Meritorious Unit Award	Air Force Outstanding Unit Award with Valor device and three oak leaf clusters
4th row	Air Force Organizational Excellence Award with oak leaf cluster	National Defense Service Medal with one bronze service star	Southwest Asia Service Medal with two service stars
5th row	Global War on Terrorism Service Medal	Humanitarian Service Medal with service star	Air Force Overseas Ribbon - Short with oak leaf cluster
6th row	Air Force Overseas Ribbon - Long	Air Force Longevity Service Award Ribbon with one silver and one bronze oak leaf clusters	Recruiting Service Ribbon
7th row	Air Force Training Ribbon	Kuwait Liberation Medal (Saudi Arabia)	Kuwait Liberation Medal (Kuwait)
Badge	Headquarters Air Force badge		

- Doctor of Divinity, Honoris Causa, Lutheran Theological Southern Seminary of Lenoir-Rhyne University, May 24, 2014.

== See also ==
- Chief of Chaplains of the United States Air Force
- Armed Forces Chaplains Board

Military offices
Preceded by Cecil R. Richardson	Chief of Chaplains of the United States Air Force; 2012–2015	Succeeded by Dondi E. Costin
