= Terence P. Finnegan =

United States Air Force general

Terence Patrick Finnegan
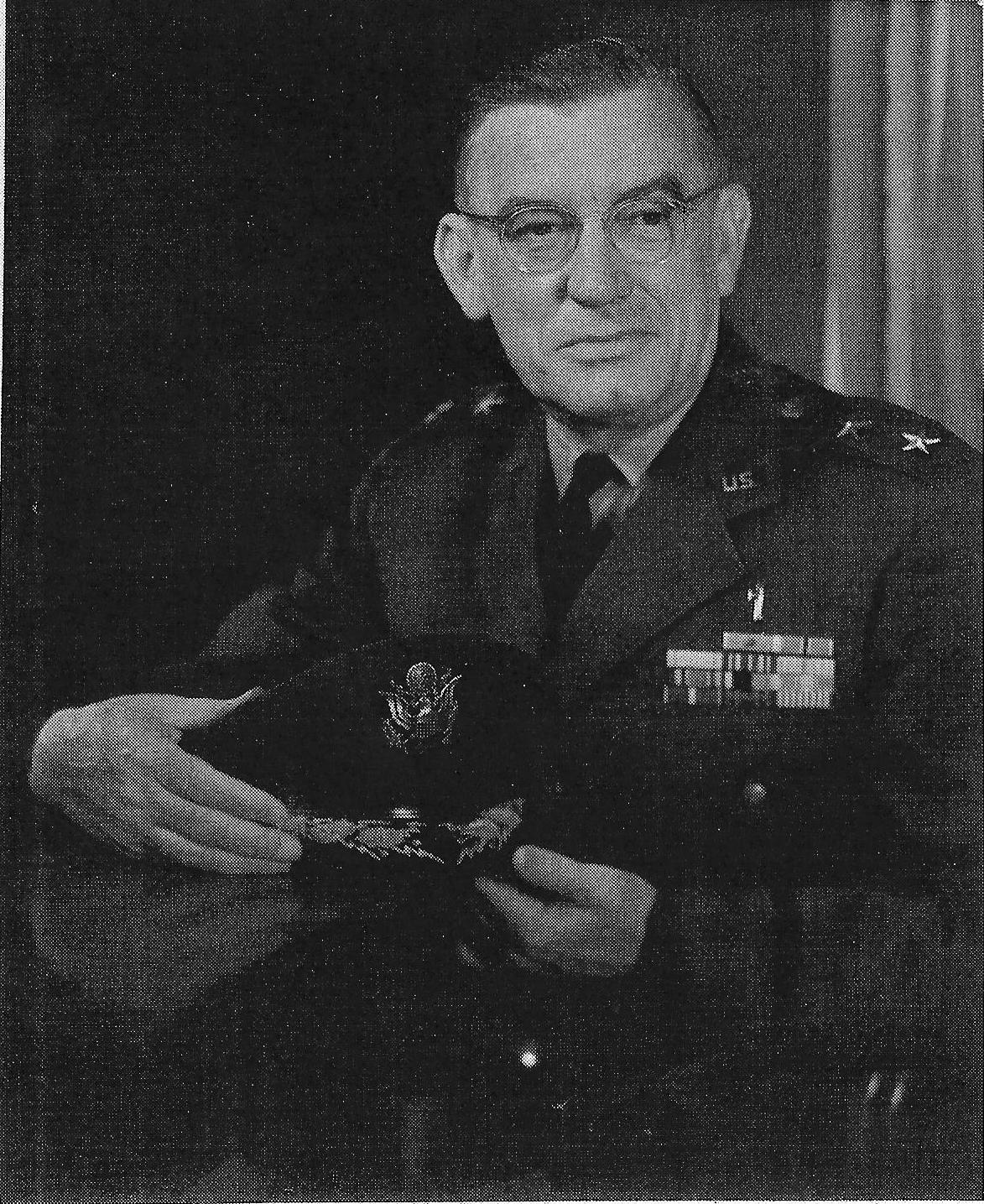
- Born: March 21, 1904; Norwich, Connecticut, U.S.
- Died: January 17, 1990 (aged 85); Deep River, Connecticut, U.S.
- Military career
- Allegiance: United States
- Branch: United States Air Force
- Rank: Major General
- Commands: Chief of Chaplains of the United States Air Force

Monsignor Terence Patrick Finnegan (March 21, 1904 – January 17, 1990) was Chief of Chaplains of the United States Air Force.

== Biography ==
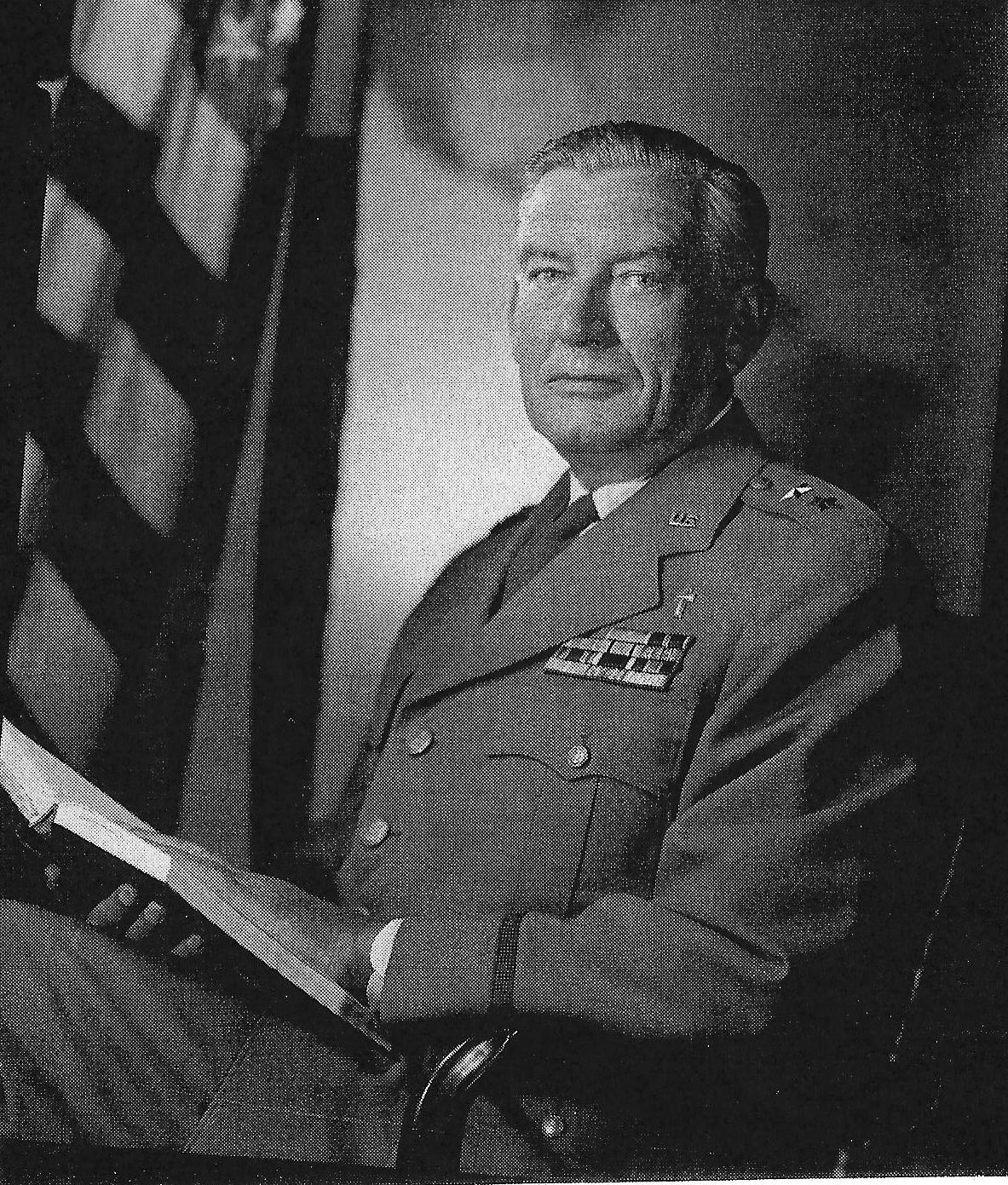
Finnegan in a 1962 portrait.

Born in Norwich, Connecticut in 1904, Finnegan was an ordained Roman Catholic priest. He was a graduate of St. Thomas Seminary and St. Mary's Seminary and University. In 1956, he was given the title of Monsignor by Pope Pius XII.

== Career ==
Finnegan was originally commissioned an officer in the United States Army Reserve in 1937. He was commissioned an officer in the Regular Army in 1940. On December 7, 1941, he was present for the attack on Pearl Harbor. During World War II, he served in the Guadalcanal Campaign and the Mediterranean Theater of Operations. In 1949, Finnegan transferred to the United States Air Force and was assigned to Headquarters Continental Air Command. From 1950 to 1952, he served in the Korean War.

After returning to the United States, Finnegan was named Command Chaplain at Headquarters Air Training Command. In 1953, he became Deputy Chief of Chaplains of the United States Air Force. He achieved the rank of major general and was promoted to Chief of Chaplains in 1958. He remained in that position until his retirement in 1962.

Awards he received include the Legion of Merit with oak leaf cluster, the Bronze Star Medal, the American Defense Service Medal, the American Campaign Medal, the Asiatic-Pacific Campaign Medal, the World War II Victory Medal, the Korean Service Medal, the United Nations Korea Medal, the National Defense Service Medal and the Air Force Longevity Service Award with silver oak leaf cluster.

In addition, he was the second person honored with the Norwich Native Son Award in 1969.

Military offices
Preceded by Charles I. Carpenter	Chief of Chaplains of the United States Air Force; 1958–1962	Succeeded by Robert P. Taylor
