= Cecil R. Richardson =

United States general

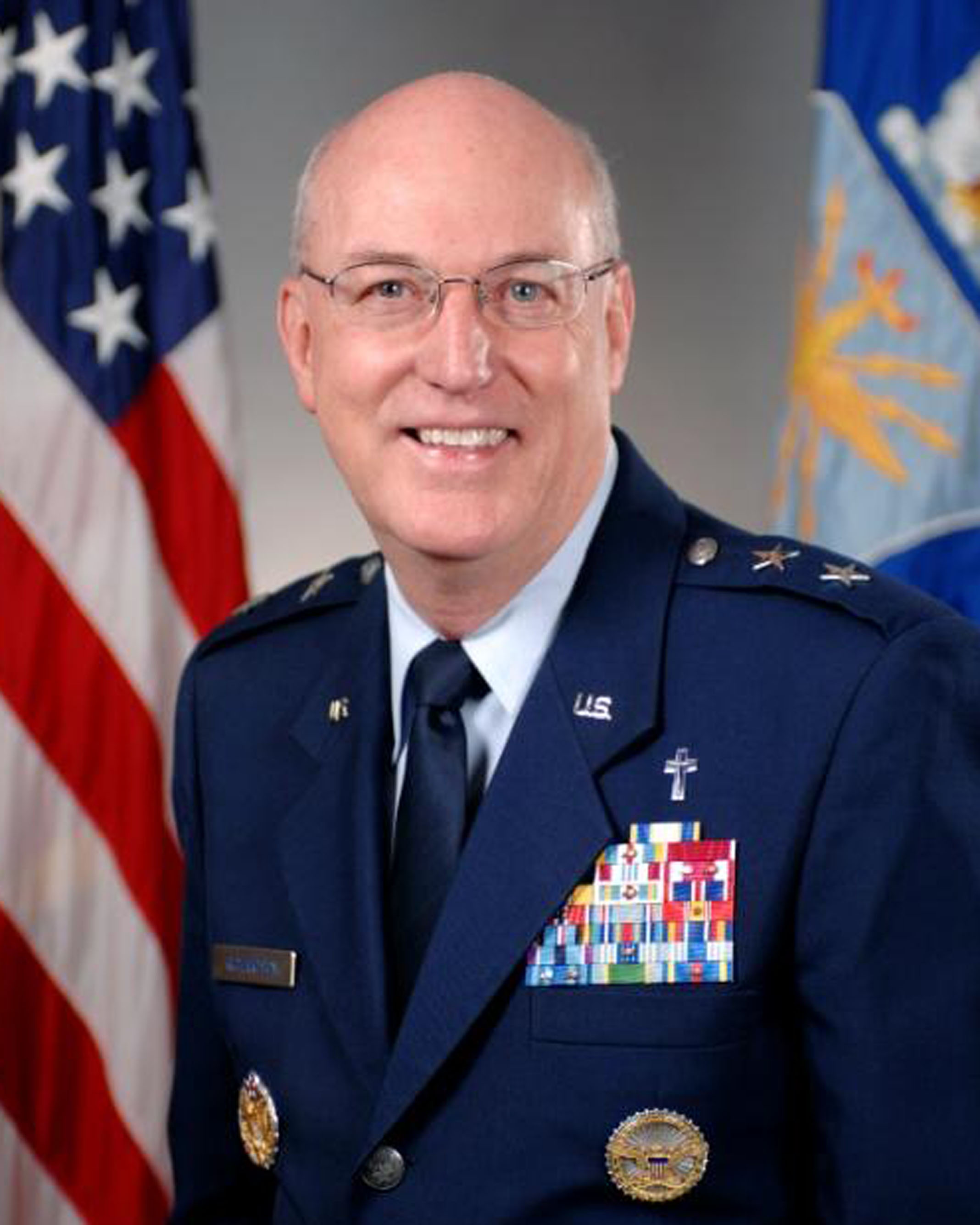
- Born: 1947 or 1948 (age 78–79); West Virginia, United States
- Military career
- Allegiance: United States of America
- Branch: United States Air Force
- Service years: 1966–1970 (enlisted); 1977–2012
- Rank: Major General
- Awards: Air Force Distinguished Service Medal (2); Defense Superior Service Medal (2); Legion of Merit

Chaplain (Major General) Cecil Roland Richardson, USAF (born c. 1947), retired as the 16th Chief of Chaplains of the United States Air Force, effective June 1, 2012, with an official retirement ceremony on May 30, 2012. He was appointed to that assignment on May 28, 2008.

Richardson, a member of the Assemblies of God, was the first Pentecostal minister to be promoted to flag officer rank in the U.S. Air Force. He has said that his role was to be "a pastor to Christians, and a chaplain to all."

== Early military career ==
Before ordination, Richardson served in the Air Force as an enlisted man, working as a Russian interpreter and intercept operator.

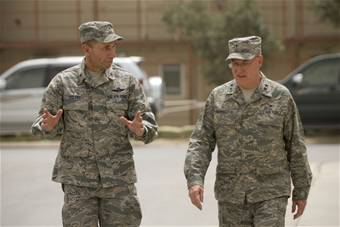
With Brig Gen Mike Holmes, during Richardson's first visit to Bagram Airbase Afghanistan since taking over as Air Force Chief of Chaplains.

== Education ==
Richardson's educational background includes:

- 1973 Bachelor of Arts degree in Biblical studies, Evangel University, Springfield, Mo.
- 1976 Master of Divinity degree in Hebrew studies, Trinity Evangelical Divinity School, Deerfield, Ill.
- 1981 Squadron Officer School, by correspondence
- 1988 Air Command and Staff College, by correspondence
- 1992 Air War College, by seminar

== Assignments ==
Richardson served as Deputy Air Force Chief of Chaplains from April 2004-May 2008, and began serving as Chief of Chaplains May 2008. Prior to these positions, his assignments included:

=== Enlisted assignments ===
- June 1966 - May 1967, Russian language student, Syracuse University, N.Y.
- June 1967 - August 1967, electronic intercept student, Goodfellow AFB, Texas
- August 1967 - December 1968, Russian intercept operator, Karamursel Air Base, Turkey
- January 1969 - January 1970, Russian interpreter, National Security Agency, Fort George G. Meade, Md.

=== Chaplain assignments ===
- April 1977 - June 1980, Protestant chaplain, 314th Tactical Airlift Wing, Little Rock AFB, Ark.
- June 1980 - July 1981, senior Protestant chaplain, 5073rd Air Base Group, Shemya AFB, Alaska
- July 1981 - July 1983, Protestant chaplain, 1606th Air Base Wing, Kirtland AFB, N.M.
- July 1983 - July 1984, Air Staff Training officer, Office of the Chief of Chaplains, Bolling AFB, D.C.
- July 1984 - June 1986, senior Protestant chaplain, 410th Bombardment Wing, K.I. Sawyer AFB, Mich.
- June 1986 - June 1988, installation staff chaplain, 7276th Air Base Group, Iraklion Air Station, Greece
- June 1988 - July 1991, Chief, Education and Professional Development Division, Office of the Command Chaplain, Air Mobility Command, Scott AFB, Ill.
- July 1991 - June 1993, senior chaplain, 62nd Airlift Wing, McChord AFB, Wash.
- June 1993 - August 1995, assignments officer, Office of the Chief of Chaplains, Bolling AFB, D.C.
- August 1995 - February 1997, executive director, Armed Forces Chaplains Board, Office of the Under Secretary of Defense, the Pentagon, Washington, D.C.
- February 1997 - June 2000, Command Chaplain, U.S. Central Command, MacDill AFB, Fla.
- July 2000 - June 2003, Command Chaplain, Air Combat Command, Langley AFB, Va.
- July 2003 - April 2004, Director, USAF Chaplain Service Institute, Maxwell AFB, Ala.

== Awards and military decorations ==
Among Richardson's numerous military awards and decorations are:

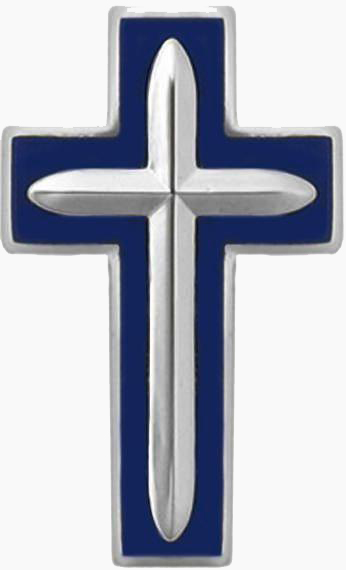

Badge	Air Force Christian Chaplain Badge			
1st Row	Air Force Distinguished Service Medal with one bronze oak leaf cluster	Defense Superior Service Medal with oak leaf cluster	Legion of Merit	Defense Meritorious Service Medal
2nd Row	Meritorious Service Medal with silver and bronze oak leaf clusters	Air Force Commendation Medal with oak leaf cluster	Joint Meritorious Unit Award with oak leaf cluster	Air Force Outstanding Unit Award
3rd Row	Air Force Organizational Excellence Award with oak leaf cluster	Air Force Good Conduct Medal	National Defense Service Medal with two bronze service stars	Armed Forces Expeditionary Medal
4th Row	Global War on Terrorism Expeditionary Medal	Global War on Terrorism Service Medal	Humanitarian Service Medal	Air Force Overseas Ribbon - Short with oak leaf cluster
5th Row	Air Force Overseas Ribbon - Long	Air Force Longevity Service Award Ribbon with silver and three bronze oak leaf clusters	Small Arms Expert Marksmanship Ribbon	Air Force Training Ribbon with oak leaf cluster
Badges	Office of the Secretary of Defense Identification Badge		Headquarters Air Force badge	

== See also ==
- Chiefs of Chaplains of the United States
- Armed Forces Chaplains Board

Military offices
Preceded by Charles C. Baldwin	Chief of Chaplains of the United States Air Force; 2008–2012	Succeeded by Howard D. Stendahl
