= 1936 Syracuse Orangemen men's soccer team =

American college soccer season

1936 Syracuse Orangemen men's soccer

ISFA, national champions (ASHA)
- Conference: Independent
- Record: 6–0–2
- Head coach: Arthur Horrocks (10th season)
- Home stadium: Archbold Stadium

The 1936 season was Syracuse University's 17 season fielding a men's varsity soccer team. The team played their home matches at Archbold Stadium, and were coached by Arthur Horrocks in their tenth season as head coach.

Guido Semino lead the Orangemen in goals scored scoring 23 goals across eight matches.

== Roster ==
The following individuals were letterwinners for the 1936 season.

Note: Flags indicate national team as defined under FIFA eligibility rules; some limited exceptions apply. Players may hold more than one non-FIFA nationality.

No.	Pos.	Nation	Player
—		(United States) USA	Edwin Anuswith
—			James Archibald
—			Oscar Jack Burkland
—			Herman Grafman
—		(Sweden) SWE	Evald Gustavson
—		(United States) USA	Lou Hannum
—			David Hughes ‡
—			Charles Lanning
—			Charles Rapp

No.	Pos.	Nation	Player
—			John Rogers
—	FW	(Italy) ITA	Guido Semino
—			Herbert Shears
—		(United States) USA	John Simonaitis
—		(United States) USA	Roy Terry ‡
—		(United States) USA	Henry Thomulka
—			William Thompson
—		(United States) USA	Gordon Trachsel
—		(United States) USA	William Trachsel
—			Frederick Trani

‡ Team co-captains

== Schedule ==
Date Time, TV	Rank^{#}	Opponent^{#}	Result	Record	Site (Attendance) City, State
Regular season
October 10*; 2:00 p.m.		Cornell	W 6–1	1–0–0	Archbold Stadium; Syracuse, NY
October 17*; 12:00 p.m.		Buffalo State	W 10–1	2–0–0	Archbold Stadium; Syracuse, NY
October 24*; 1:00 p.m.		vs. Lehigh	W 1–0	3–0–0	Unknown; Unknown
Unknown*; Unknown		vs. Springfield	T 3–3 ^{OT}	3–0–1	Unknown; Unknown
October 31*; 2:00 p.m.		Penn State; Rivalry	T 4–4 ^{OT}	3–0–2	Archbold Stadium; Syracuse, NY
November 7*; 12:00 p.m.		vs. Cortland	W 12–3	4–0–2	Unknown; Unknown
November 10*; 1:00 p.m.		at Colgate	W 8–0	5–0–2	Whitnall Field; Hamilton, NY
November 12*; 12:00 p.m.		vs. Rochester	W 5–0	6–0–2	Unknown; Unknown
*Non-conference game. ^{#}Rankings from United Soccer Coaches. (#) Tournament seedings in parentheses.
