= Jeremiah J. Rodell =

United States Air Force general

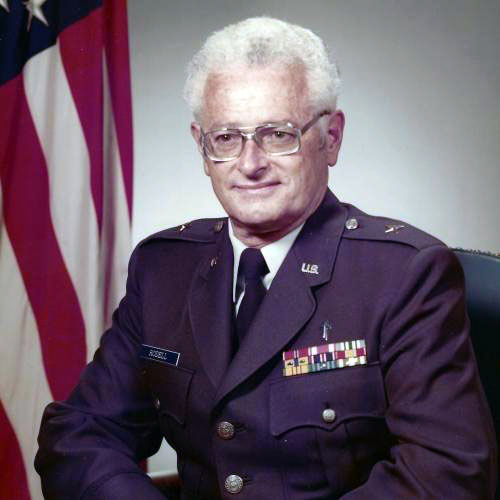
- Born: September 28, 1921; Minneapolis, Minnesota, United States
- Died: April 17, 2015 (aged 93); Lisle, Illinois, United States
- Military career
- Allegiance: United States of America
- Branch: United States Air Force
- Service years: 1955–1980
- Rank: Brigadier General
- Awards: Bronze Star, Meritorious Service Medal, Joint Service Commendation Medal, Air Force Commendation Medal (2 oak leaf clusters), Air Force Outstanding Unit Award

Jeremiah J. Rodell (September 28, 1921 – April 17, 2015) was a brigadier general in the United States Air Force that served as Deputy Chief of Chaplains of the United States Air Force from 1978 to 1980.

== Biography ==
Rodell was born in Minneapolis, Minnesota in 1921. He grew up in Chicago, Illinois and attended Quigley Preparatory Seminary, Chicago. He then attended St. Mary of the Lake Seminary, Mundelein, Illinois from 1940 to 1947 and graduated with a Master of Arts degree. On June 5, 1947, Rodell was ordained for the Archdiocese of Chicago and served as a parish priest on Chicago's West Side from June 1947 to December 1955.

Rodell entered active military service in December 1955. For the next 18 years he served stateside military parishes at Holloman Air Force Base, Eglin Air Force Base, Little Rock Air Force Base, March Air Force Base, Wright-Patterson Air Force Base, and Offutt Air Force Base. During this some period, his overseas assignments included Naha Airport (Okinawa, Japan), Ankara, Turkey, Clark Air Base (Philippines), Ubon Royal Thai Air Force Base (Thailand), and Wiesbaden Air Base (Germany). In 1973 Rodell was assigned to Headquarters Aerospace Defense Command, Colorado Springs, Colorado, as chief of Catholic plans and programs. In 1975 he was transferred to the Personnel Division, Office of the Chief of Chaplains. Rodell assumed the position of deputy chief of chaplains on August 1, 1978.

Rodell's military decorations and awards include the Bronze Star, Meritorious Service Medal, Joint Service Commendation Medal, Air Force Commendation Medal with two oak leaf clusters and Air Force Outstanding Unit Award. Rodell served for three years on the Advisory Council to the Military Vicar, Terence Cardinal Cooke. In 1978, he became the chairman of the Action Committee to the Advisory Council. Since 1974, he had been active in the worldwide Marriage Encounter movement. Rodell's hobbies included tennis, sailing, painting, and swimming. He was promoted to the grade of brigadier general on December 1, 1978, with the same date of rank, and retired on August 1, 1980. He died in 2015.
