= Leon Pierce Clark =

American psychiatrist and psychoanalyst (1870-1933)

Leon Pierce Clark (1870 – 3 December 1933) was an American psychiatrist and psychoanalyst. He was the president of the American Psychopathological Association (APPA) during 1923 and 1924.

His pioneering work in psychobiography was published during the last four years of his life and was way ahead of his time. In 1929 Clark published Napoleon: Self-Destroyed, the first book-size psychoanalytic study of Napoleon Bonaparte. In the last year of his life he published Lincoln: A Psycho-biography, another early work in this field.

Clark fought some of the heated battles of the American psychiatrists against the American neurologists that were common in the first part of the twentieth century.

== Bibliography ==
- Clark, Leon Pierce (1929) Napoleon Self-Destroyed. Foreword by James Harvey Robinson. New York: Jonathan Cape and Harrison Smith.
- Clark, Leon Pierce (1933) Lincoln: A Psycho-biography. New York and London, C. Scribner's Sons.
- Review of "Napoleon: Self-Destroyed", 1930, in the "Journal of Nervous and Mental Disease," 71 (3): 347–356. This critique seems to have been forgotten. See also letters in Jelliffe Papers, Library of Congress.
