= John F. Albert =

United States Air Force general

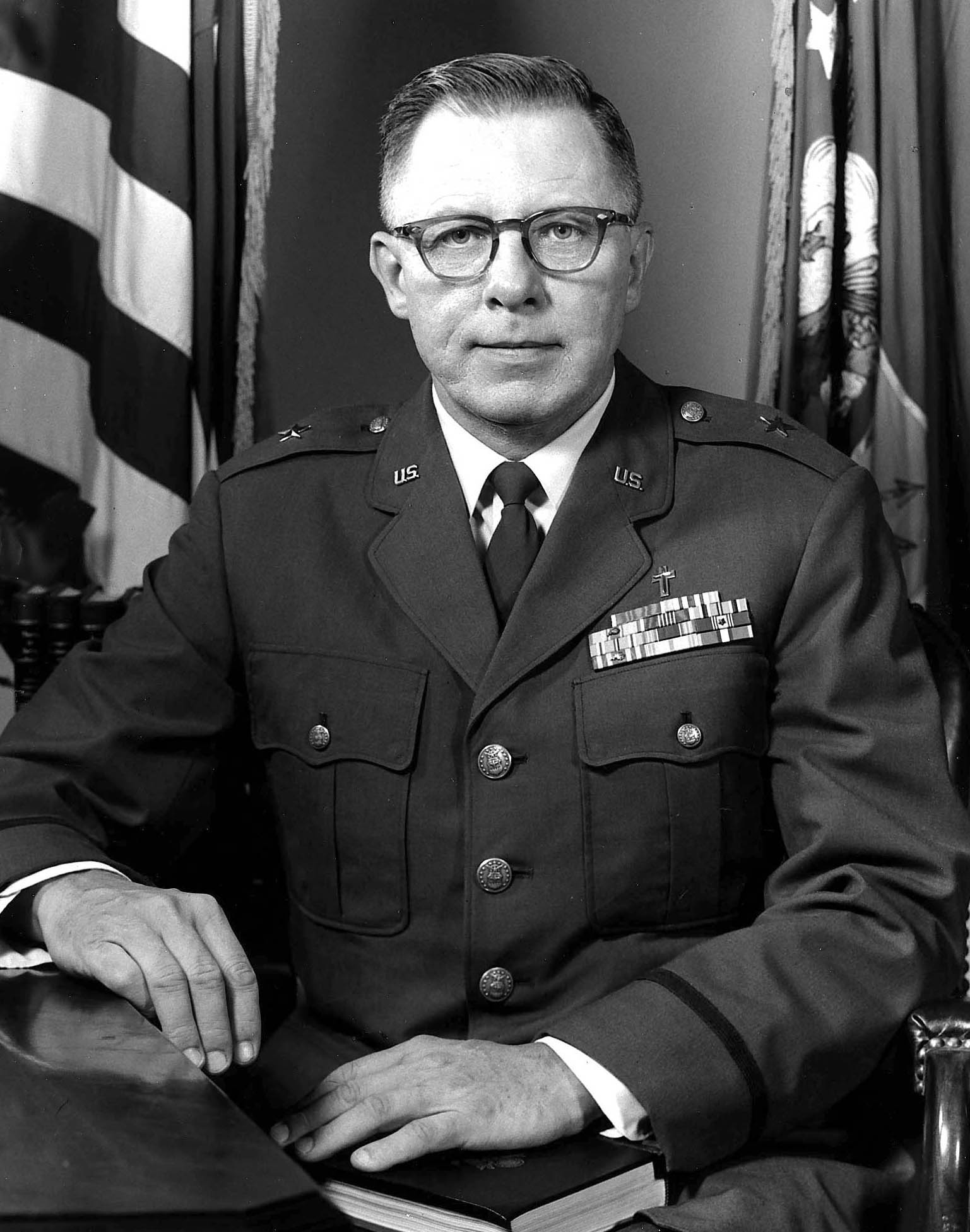
- Born: March 28, 1915; Rochester, New York
- Died: August 1, 1989 (aged 74)
- Military career
- Allegiance: United States
- Branch: United States Army; United States Air Force
- Service years: 1945 – 1947 (Army); 1947 – 1972 (Air Force)
- Rank: brigadier general
- Commands: Deputy Chief of Chaplains
- Awards: Legion of Merit; Joint Service Commendation Medal; Air Force Commendation Medal with oak leaf cluster; Army Commendation Medal

John Francis Albert (March 28, 1915 – August 1, 1989) was Deputy Chief of Chaplains of the United States Air Force.

== Biography ==
Albert was born in Rochester, New York, in 1915. He graduated from St. Bernard's School of Theology and Ministry and was ordained a Roman Catholic priest in 1941. In 1969, he was given the title of Monsignor by Pope Paul VI. He died on August 1, 1989.

== Military career ==
Albert originally joined the United States Army in 1945 before transferring to the Air Force after its inception. In 1970, he was promoted to the rank of brigadier general and became Deputy Chief of Chaplains later that year. He retired in 1972.

Awards he received include the Legion of Merit, the Joint Service Commendation Medal, the Air Force Commendation Medal with oak leaf cluster and the Army Commendation Medal.
