= William Leon Clark =

United States Air Force general

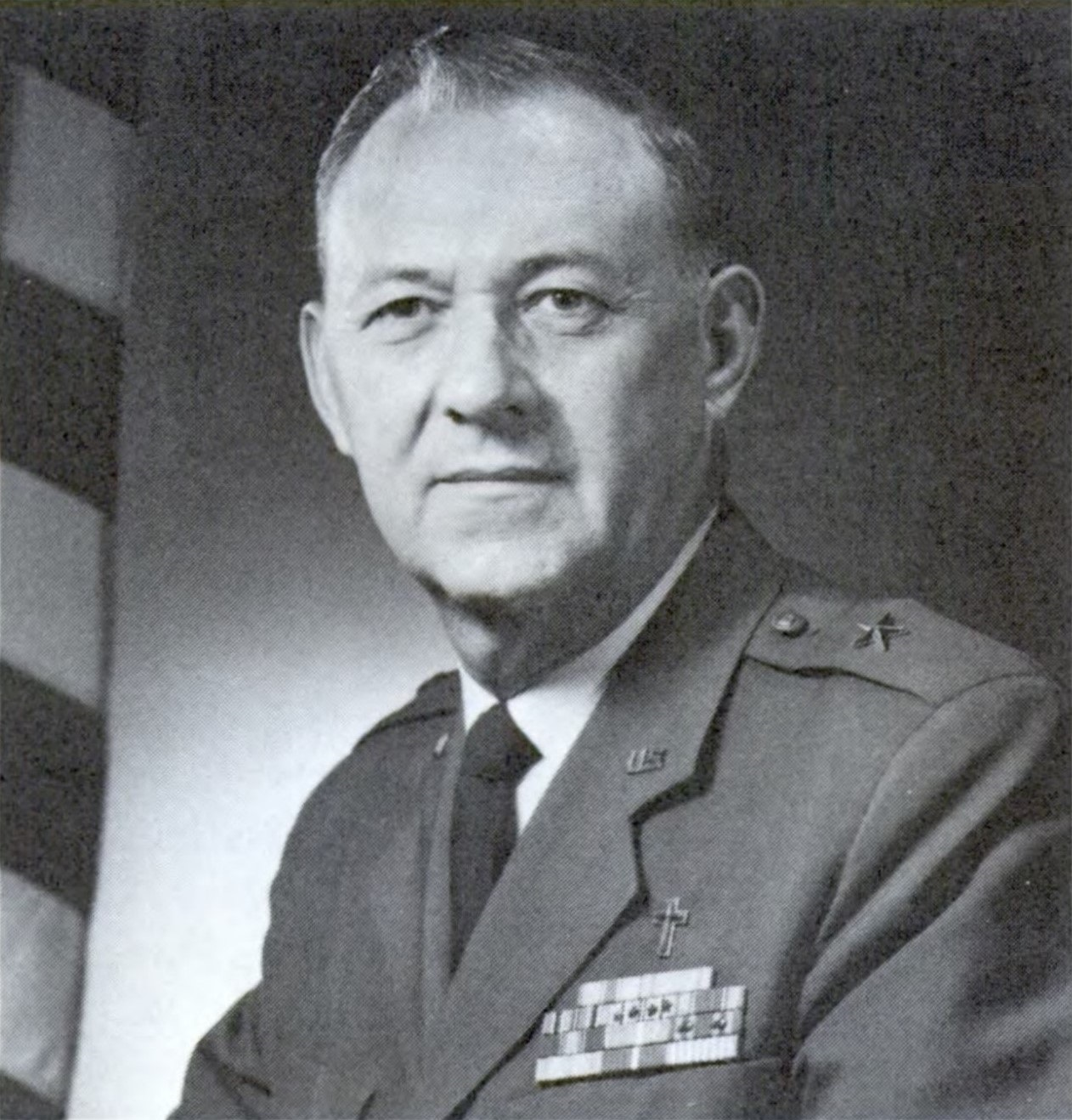
Brig. Gen. William L. Clark

William Leon Clark (March 21, 1911 – March 19, 2005) was Deputy Chief of Chaplains of the United States Air Force.

He was born in Scott County, Mississippi on March 21, 1911 and grew up in Hattiesburg and Petal. He attended Pearl River Community College, Mississippi College, Southwestern Baptist Theological Seminary and New Orleans Baptist Theological Seminary and became an ordained Baptist pastor.

== Military career ==
Clark originally joined the United States Army in 1941. During World War II, he served with the Third Air Force, Fifth Air Force and V Bomber Command. He left active duty following the war.

In 1951, he was re-called to active duty in the United States Air Force during the Korean War. Following the war, he was assigned to the Office of the United States Secretary of Defense as executive director of the Armed Forces Chaplains Board. Later, he was assigned to the Office of the Chief of Chaplains of the United States Air Force as chief of the Personnel Division.

He was promoted to brigadier general and was named Deputy Chief of Chaplains in 1966. Later, he became Command Chaplain of the United States Southern Command. Clark's retirement was effective as of January 1, 1970.

== Later life ==
Clark died on March 19, 2005 and was interred at Hillcrest Cemetery in Petal, Mississippi.
