= Armed Forces Chaplains Board =

Advisory body in the United States military

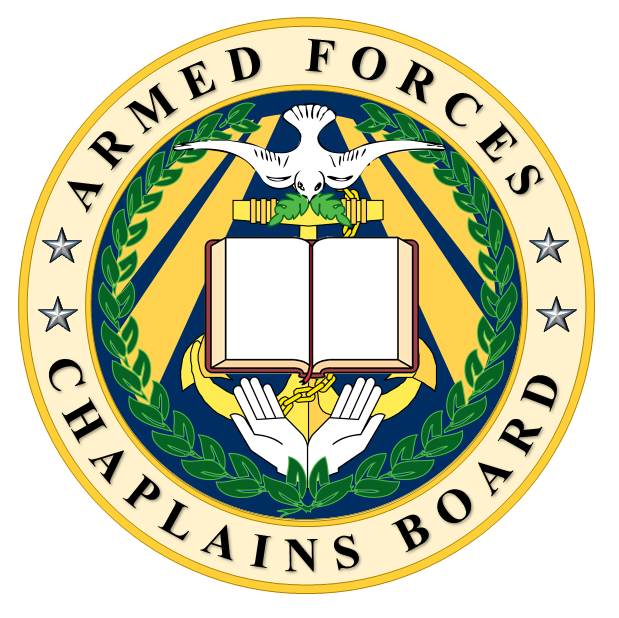
Armed Forces Chaplains Board

The Armed Forces Chaplains Board (AFCB) is an organizational entity within the United States Department of Defense established to provide advice and recommendations to OSD officials (secretary of defense and the under secretary for personnel and readiness) on policies and issues related to the free exercise of religion and on all matters concerning religion, spiritual readiness, morality, ethics, morale, and military chaplains. It is made up of the three chiefs of chaplains and three active-duty deputy chiefs of chaplains of the Army, Navy, and Air Force.

== Composition and leadership ==
The chair of the AFCB is a position rotated among the military departments, with one of the chief of chaplains of the military departments appointed as chair for a period of twelve months. In addition, a senior military chaplain holding the rank of O-6 (Army or Air Force colonel or Navy captain) serves as the AFCB executive director for a three-year term.

The board chair may establish ad hoc groups, as necessary, to conduct studies, assemble information, present recommendations, and otherwise assist the board in carrying out its responsibilities. Such groups will include at least one representative from each military department, nominated by the respective chief of chaplains.

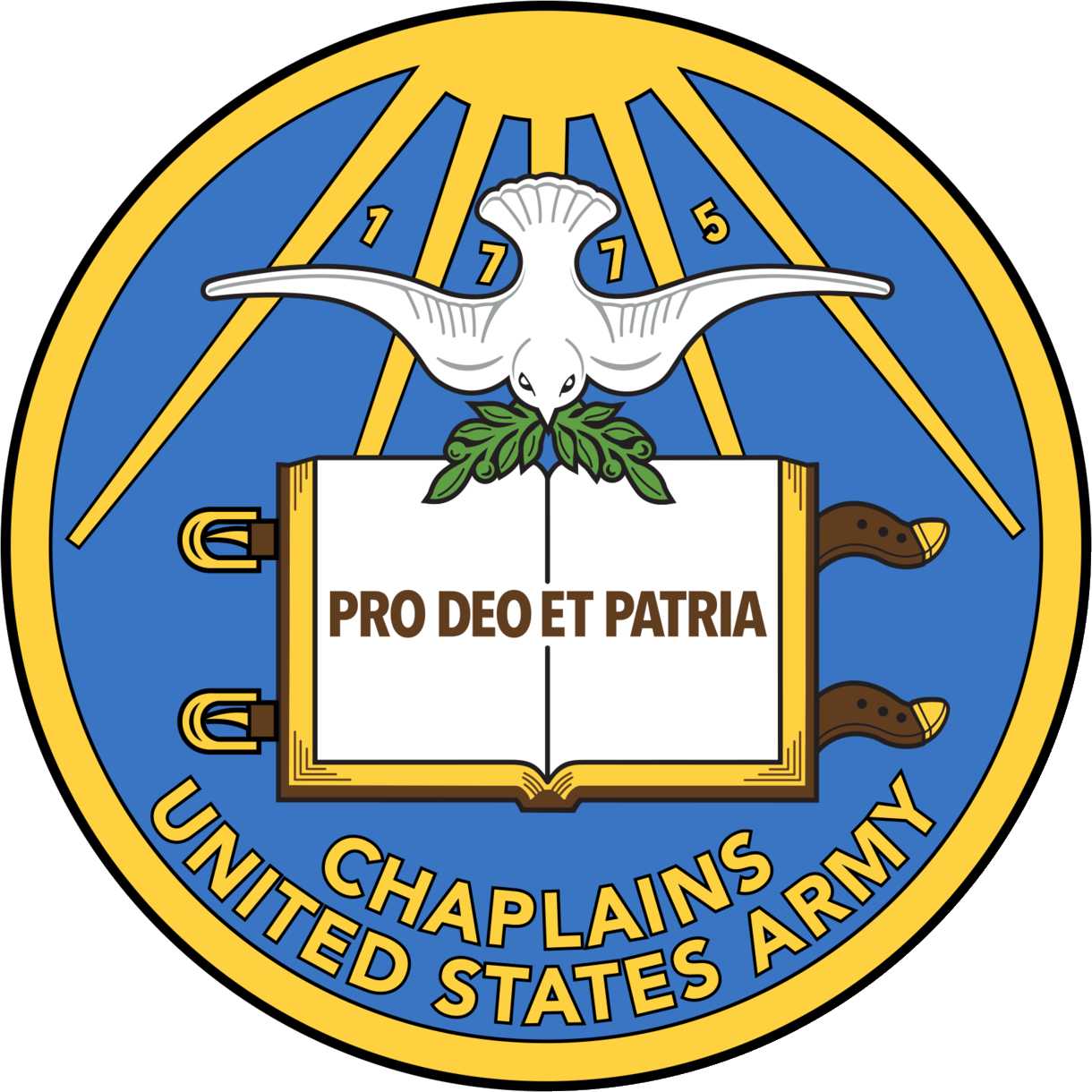
Emblem, USA Chaplain Corps

Emblem, USN Chaplain Corps

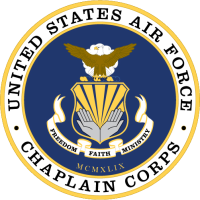
Emblem, USAF Chaplain Corps

== Policy advice ==
The AFCB is tasked to provide advice on issues and policy matters including:

- Protecting the free exercise of religion in accordance with the First Amendment of the United States Constitution.
- Procuring, training, and assigning military chaplains.
- Military chaplain professional standards and requirements.
- All religious support providers within the DoD.
- Procuring and using supplies, equipment, and facilities for religious use.
- Dialog with civilian organizations regarding religious issues.
- Joint military endeavors for delivering ministry by the Military Services throughout the DoD whenever practicable.
- The requirements of DoD Instruction 1300.17.

== Current AFCB members ==
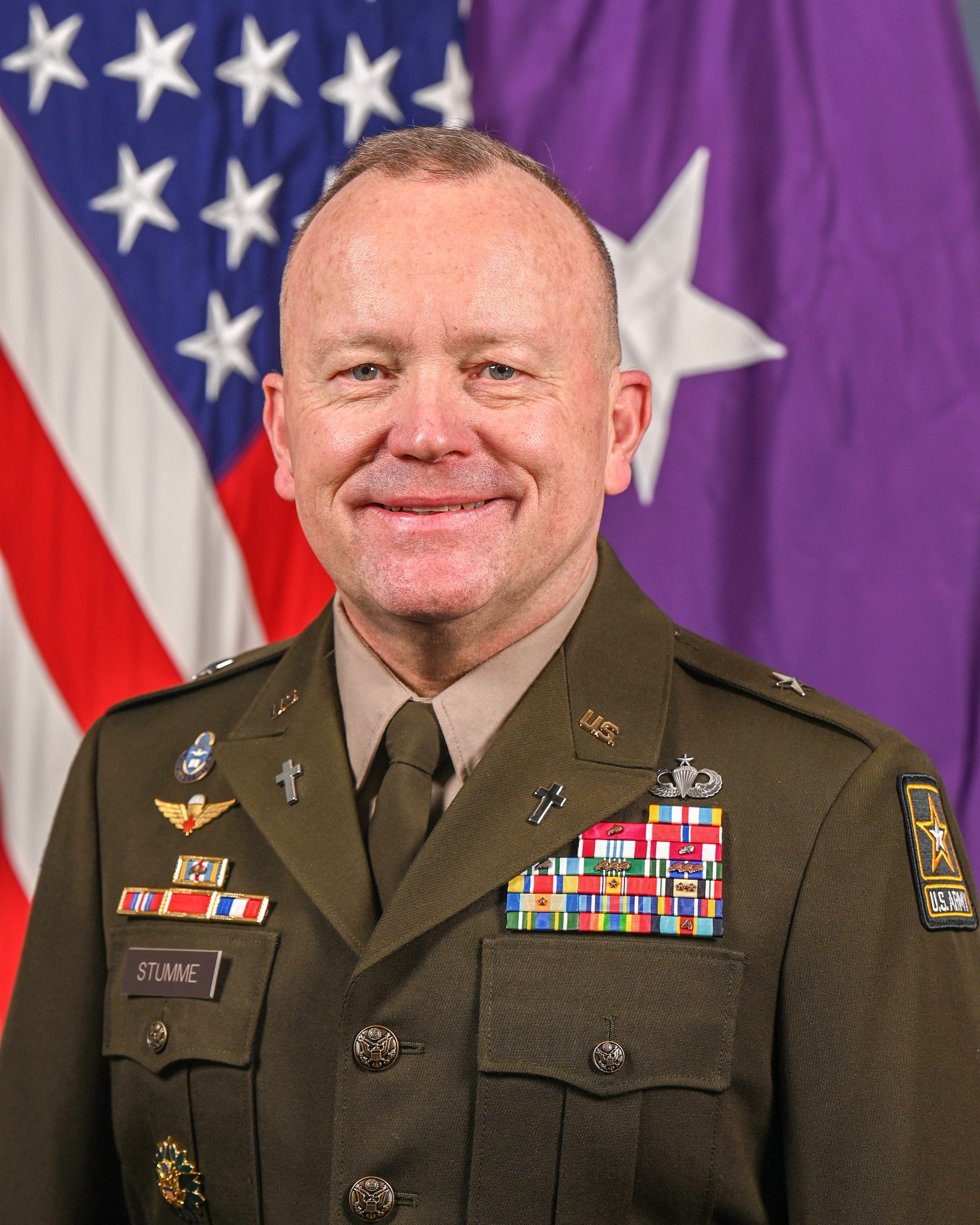
Chaplain (Brigadier General) Jack Stumme, Acting Chief of Chaplains, Deputy Chief of Chaplains of the United States Army

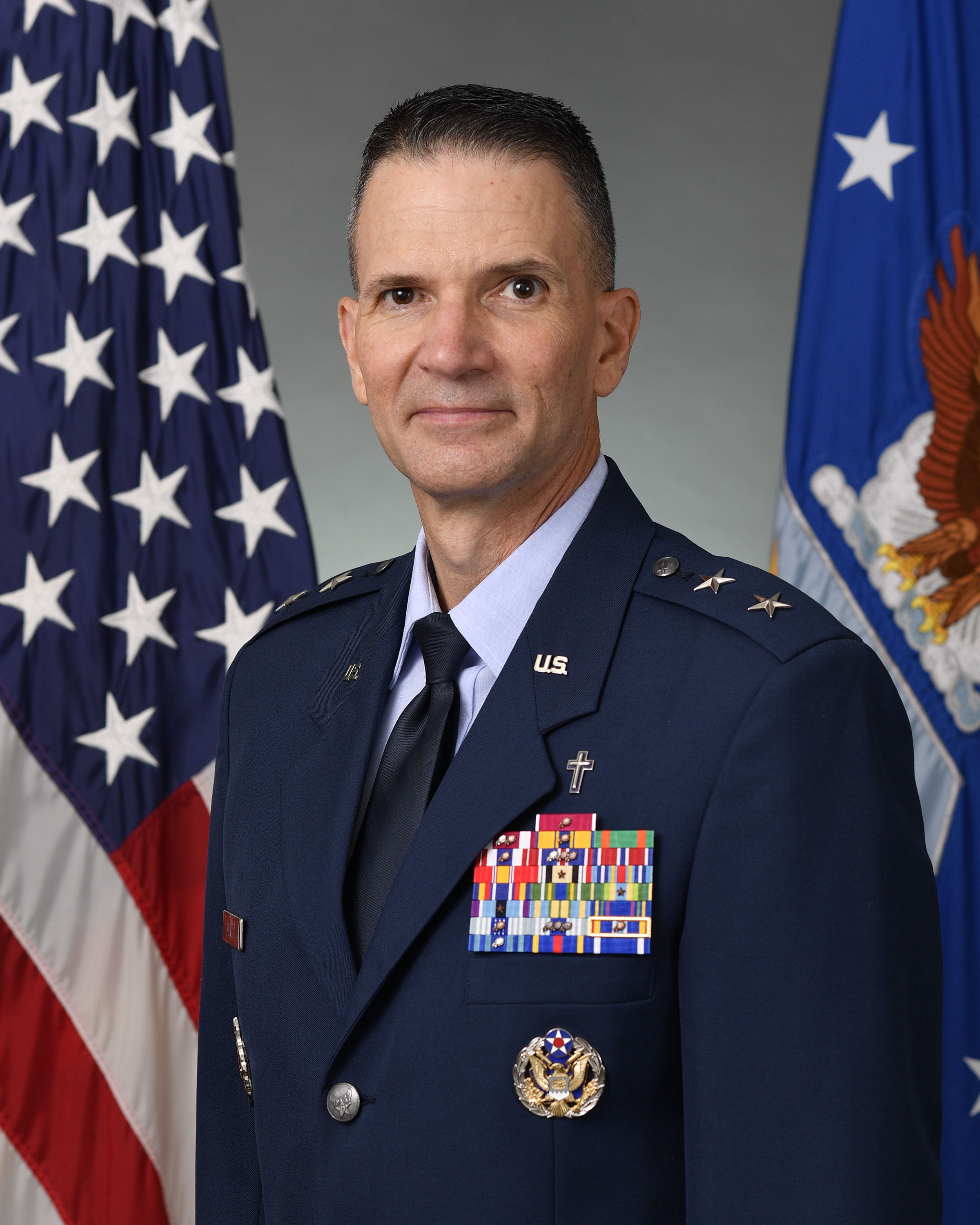
Chaplain (Major General) Trent C. Davis, Chief of Chaplains of the United States Air Force

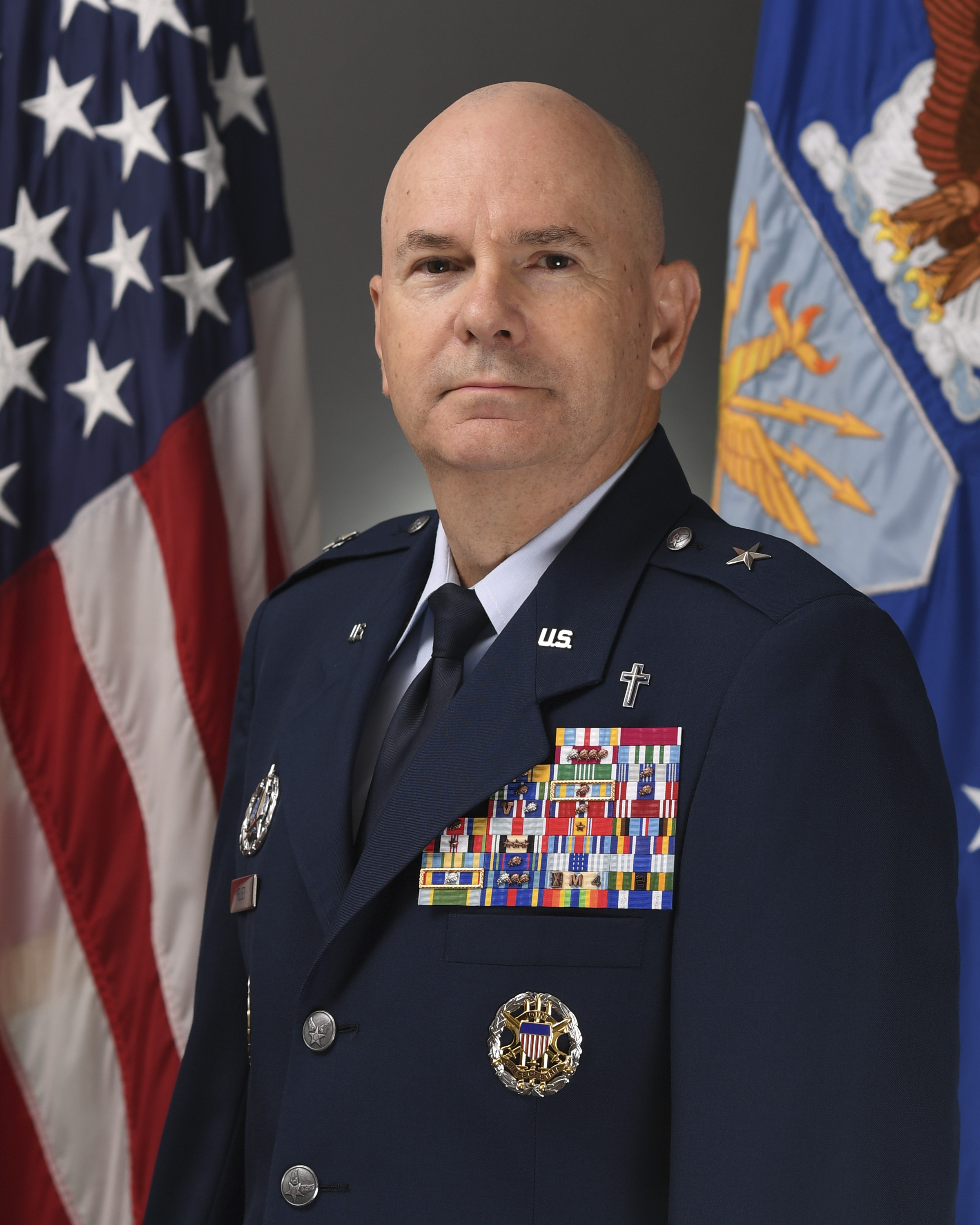
Chaplain (Brigadier General) David W. Kelley, Deputy Chief of Chaplain of the United States Air Force

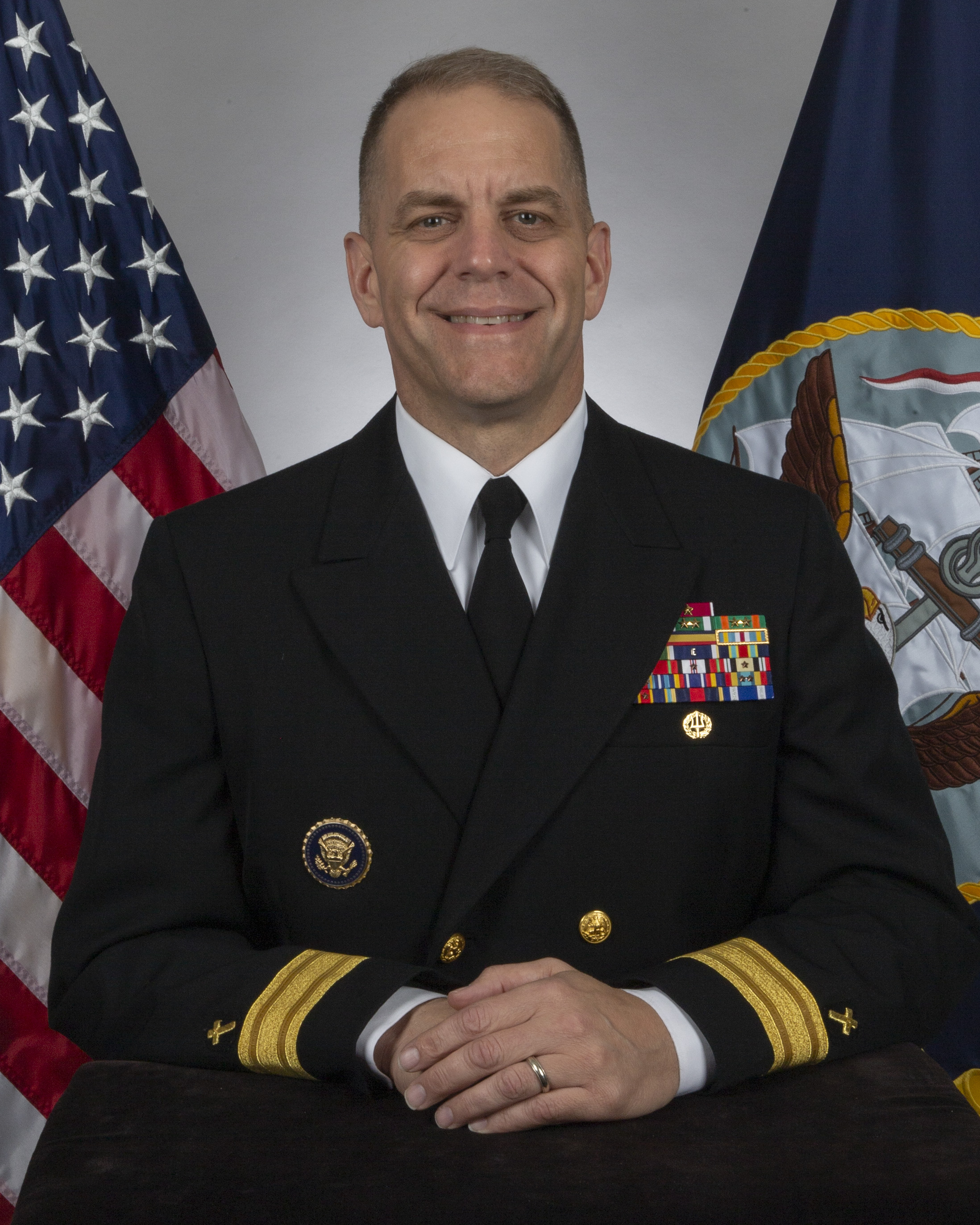
RADM Carey H. Cash, Chief of Chaplains of the United States Navy

== Executive directors ==
The current executive director is: 2026 – Present: CH (COL) Karen Meeker (Army); previously, 2024 - 2026, CH (COL) David Wake (Army); 2021 – 2024: Ch, Col Dale Marlowe (Air Force); 2019 – 2021: CAPT William Riley, CHC (Navy); 2017 – 2019: CH (COL) Jay Johns (Army); 2015 – 2017: CAPT Jere Hinson, CHC (Navy); 2012 – 2015: Ch, Col Jerry Pitts (Air Force); 2011: CH (COL) Steve Moon (Army); 2009 – 2010: CH (COL) Thomas E. Preston (Army); 2006 – 2009: CAPT Jonathan Frusti, CHC (Navy); 2003 – 2006: Ch, Col Richard Hum (Air Force); 2000 – 2003: CH (COL) Janet Horton (Army); 1998 – 2000: CAPT Russ Gunter, CHC (Navy); 1997 – 1998: CAPT M.R. Ferguson, CHC (Navy); 1995 – 1996: Ch, Col Cecil Richardson (Air Force); 1994 – 1995: Ch, Col Lorraine Potter (Air Force); 1992 – 1994: CH (COL) Herman Keizer (Army); 1991 – 1992: CH (COL) Arthur Thomas (Army); 1989 – 1991: CH (COL) Meredith Standley (Army); 1986 – 1989: Ch, Col John Mann (Air Force); 1983 – 1986: CAPT Alan Plishker, CHC (Navy); 1980 – 1983: CH (COL) Harold Lamm (Army); 1977 – 1980: Ch, Col Samuel Powell (Air Force); 1974 – 1977: CAPT Alfred Saeger, CHC (Navy); 1972 – 1974: CH (COL) Duncan Stewart (Army); 1968 – 1971: Ch, Col, Hans Sandrock (Air Force); 1965 – 1968: CAPT Samuel Sobel, CHC (Navy); 1962 – 1965: CH (COL) John Rhea (Army); 1959 – 1962: Ch, Col William Clark (Air Force); 1957 – 1959: CAPT A.M. Oliver, CHC (Navy); 1956 – 1957: CH (COL) Edward Mize (Army); 1954 – 1955: Ch, Col Vernon Goodhand (Air Force); 1952 – 1954: CAPT Francis McGann, CHC (Navy)

== See also ==
- Chiefs of Chaplains of the United States
- Military chaplain
- Chaplain
- Armed Forces Chaplaincy Center
- United States military chaplain symbols
