= Mayoral elections in Arlington, Texas =

Elections are currently every three years to elect the mayor of Arlington, Texas. Prior to 2023, elections were for two year terms.

Elections are officially non-partisan, and use a two-round system, where election runoffs are held if no candidate obtains the majority of the vote.

== 1997 ==
1997 Arlington mayoral election
- May 3, 1997
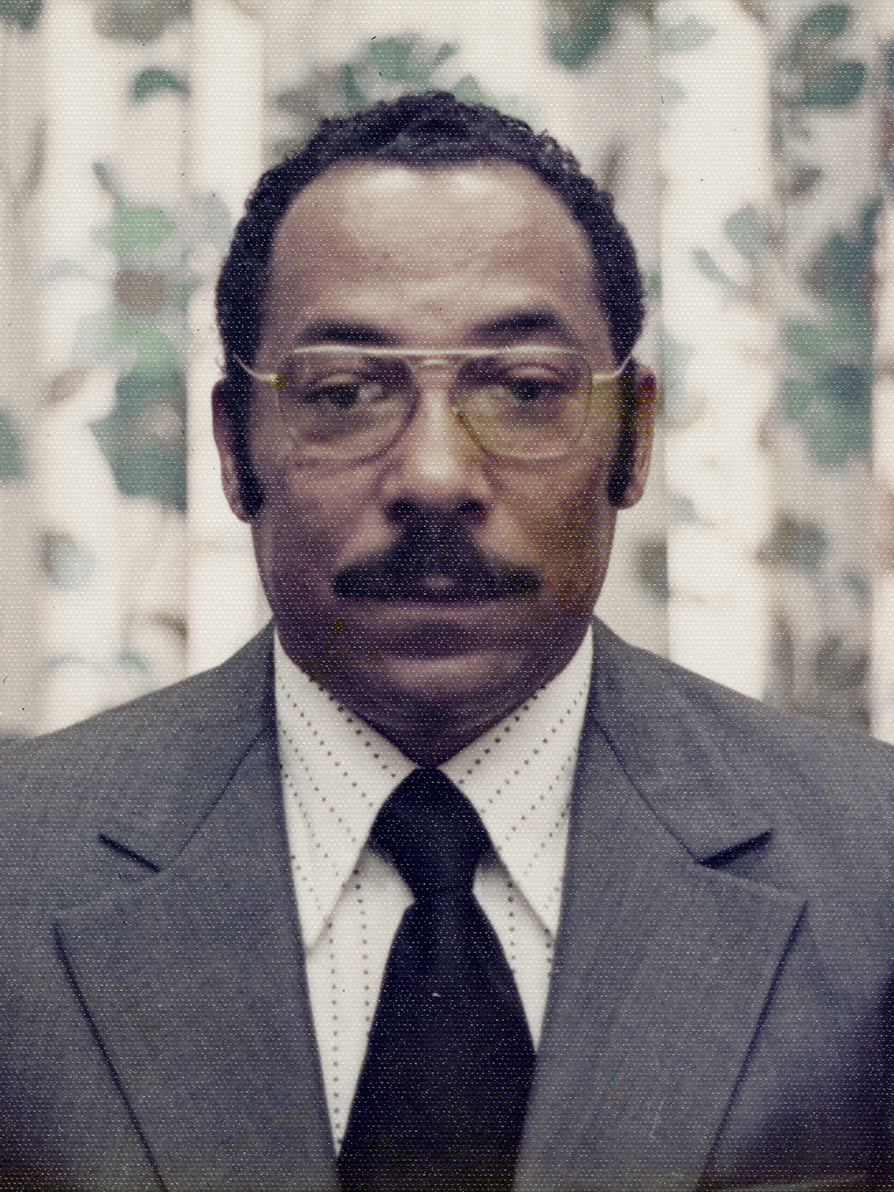

Candidate	Elzie Odom	Paula Hightower	Robert Musgrove
Party	Nonpartisan	Nonpartisan	Nonpartisan
Popular vote	8,752	7,060	1,239
Percentage	50.2%	40.5%	7.1%
Candidate	Lico Reyes
Party	Nonpartisan
Popular vote	191
Percentage	1.1%
Mayor before election
Elzie Odom
Elected mayor
Elzie Odom

The 1997 Arlington mayoral election was held on May 3, 1997. It saw the election of Elzie Odom, Arlington's first black mayor.

1997 Arlington, Texas mayoral election
Party	Candidate	Votes	%
Nonpartisan	Elzie Odom	8,752	50.2%
Nonpartisan	Paula Hightower	7,060	40.5%
Nonpartisan	Robert Musgrove	1,239	7.1%
Nonpartisan	Lico Reyes	191	1.1%
Nonpartisan	Robert Renfro	109	0.6%
Nonpartisan	Terrell Romack	56	0.3%
Nonpartisan	Dimitra Turner	29	0.2%
Total votes		17,436	

== 1999 ==
1999 Arlington mayoral election
- May 1, 1999
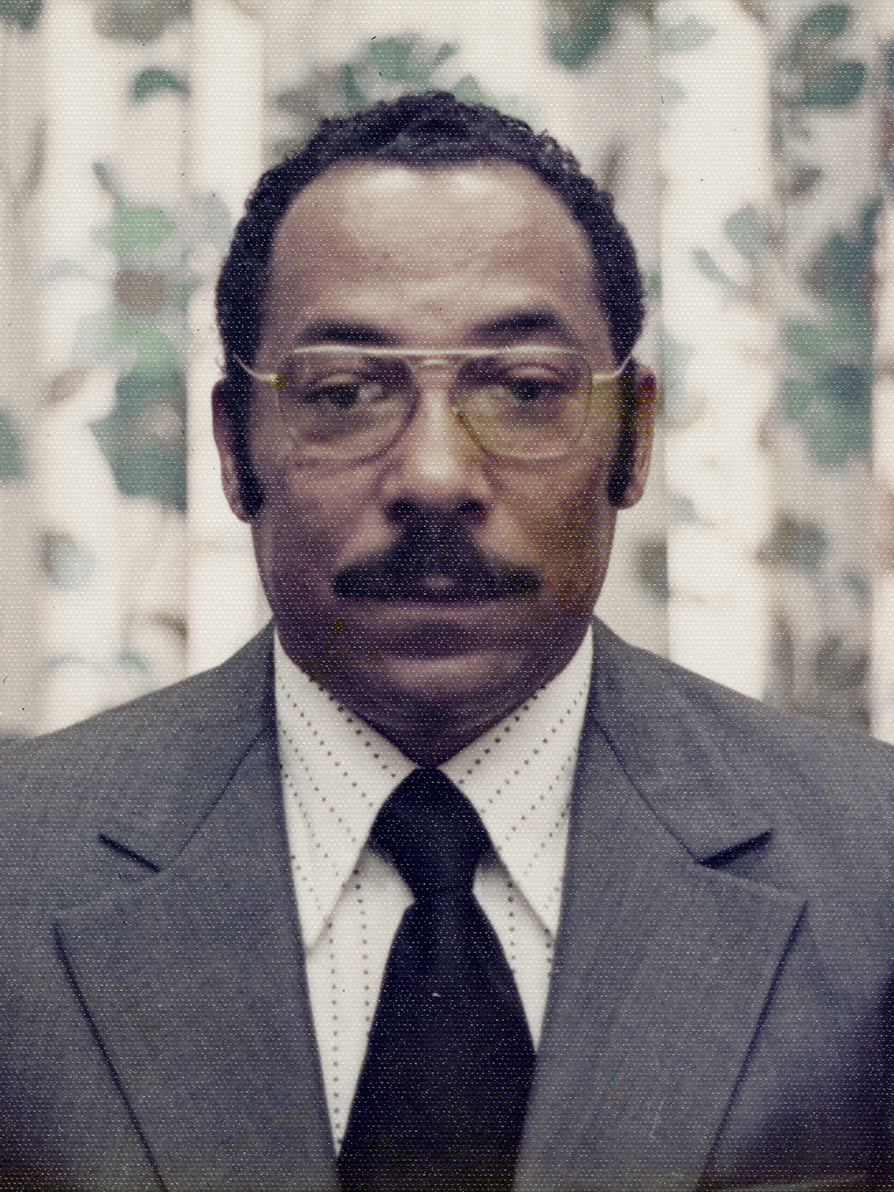

Candidate	Elzie Odom	Frederick "Lico" Reyes
Party	Nonpartisan	Nonpartisan
Popular vote	6,290	1,848
Percentage	77.3%	22.7%
Mayor before election
Elzie Odom
Elected mayor
Elzie Odom

The 1999 Arlington mayoral election was held on May 1, 1999. It saw the reelection of incumbent mayor Elzie Odom.

1999 Arlington, Texas mayoral election
Party	Candidate	Votes	%
Nonpartisan	Elzie Odom (incumbent)	6,290	77.3
Nonpartisan	Frederick "Lico" Reyes	1,848	22.7
Total votes		8,138	

== 2001 ==
2001 Arlington mayoral election
- May 5, 2001
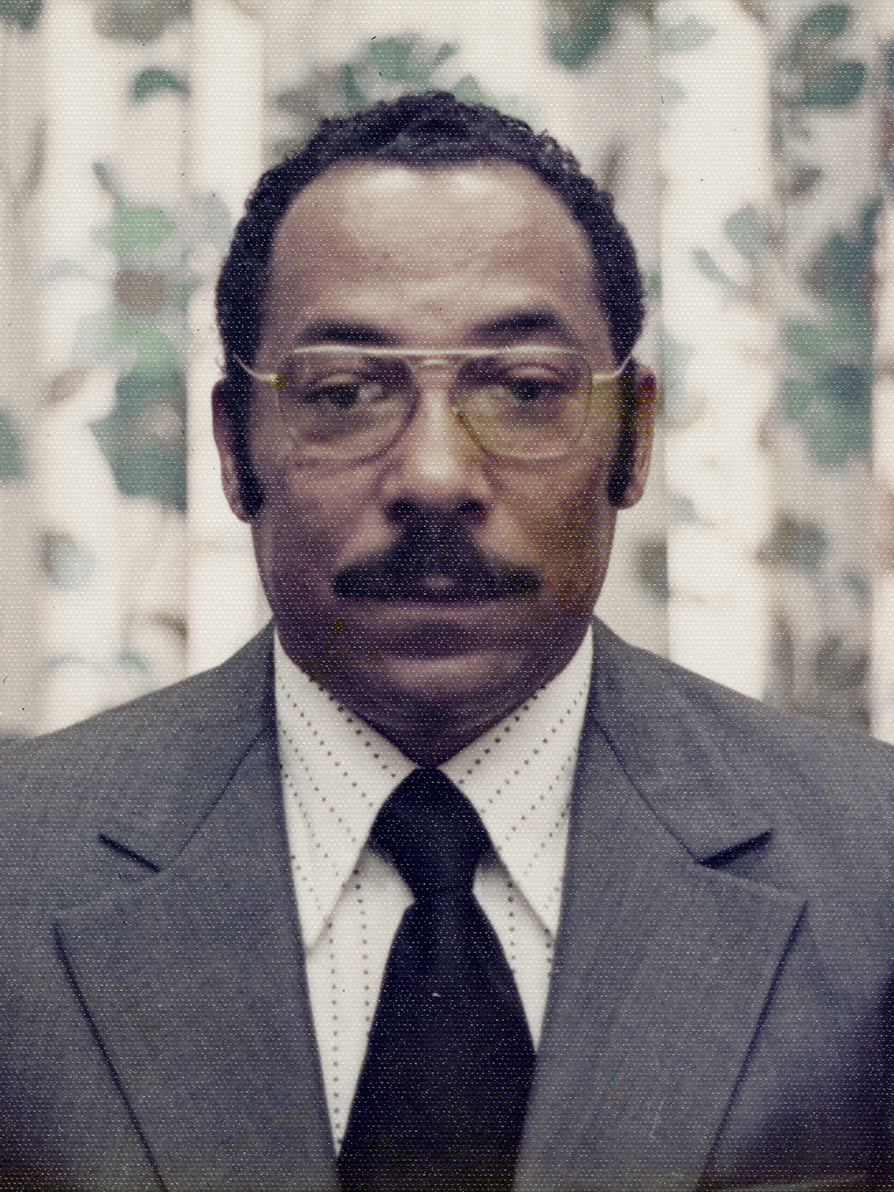

Candidate	Elzie Odom	Don Higginbotham
Party	Nonpartisan	Nonpartisan
Popular vote	4,293	2,175
Percentage	56.04%	28.39%
Candidate	Lico Reyes	Terry L. Harris
Party	Nonpartisan	Nonpartisan
Popular vote	673	405
Percentage	8.78%	5.29%
Mayor before election
Elzie Odom
Elected mayor
Elzie Odom

The 2001 Arlington mayoral election was held on May 5, 2001. It saw the reelection of incumbent mayor Elzie Odom.

2001 Arlington, Texas mayoral election
Party	Candidate	Votes	%
Nonpartisan	Elzie Odom (incumbent)	4,293	56.04
Nonpartisan	Don Higginbotham	2,175	28.39
Nonpartisan	Lico Reyes	673	8.78
Nonpartisan	Terry L. Harris	405	5.29
Nonpartisan	Dimitra "Dee" F.S. Turner	115	1.50
Total votes		7,661	

== 2003 ==
2003 Arlington mayoral election
- May 3, 2003
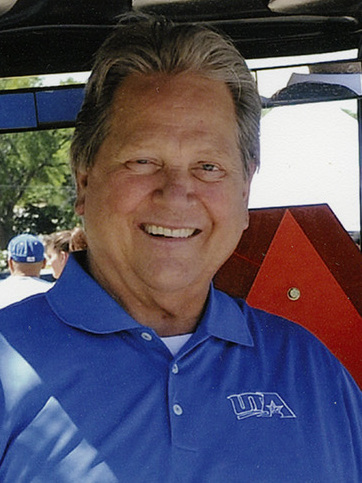

Candidate	Robert Cluck	Sheri Capehart
Party	Nonpartisan	Nonpartisan
Popular vote	7,734	3,253
Percentage	64.76%	27.24%
Mayor before election
Elzie Odom
Elected mayor
Robert Cluck
Republican

The 2003 Arlington mayoral election was held on May 3, 2003. It saw the election of Robert Cluck.

2003 Arlington, Texas mayoral election
Party	Candidate	Votes	%
Nonpartisan	Robert Cluck	9,396	56.48
Nonpartisan	Sheri Capehart	6,461	38.84
Nonpartisan	Lico Reyes	323	1.94
Nonpartisan	Tony Vann	208	1.25
Nonpartisan	Craig Smith	134	0.81
Nonpartisan	Steve White	113	0.68
Total votes		16,635	

== 2005 ==
2005 Arlington mayoral election
- May 7, 2005
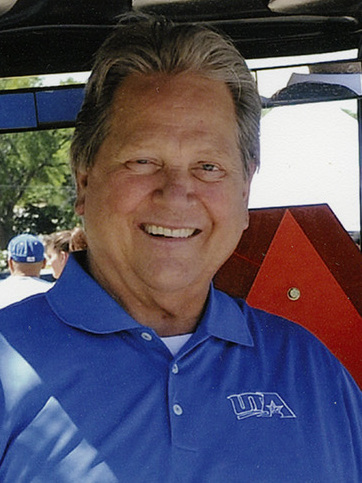

Candidate	Robert Cluck	Jerry Pikulinksi	Stephen White
Party	Nonpartisan	Nonpartisan	Nonpartisan
Popular vote	8,186	4,570	1,468
Percentage	57.55%	32.13%	10.32%
Mayor before election
Robert Cluck
Republican
Elected mayor
Robert Cluck
Republican

The 2005 Arlington mayoral election was held on May 7, 2005. It saw the reelection of incumbent mayor Robert Cluck.

2005 Arlington, Texas mayoral election
Party	Candidate	Votes	%
Nonpartisan	Robert Cluck (incumbent)	8,186	57.55
Nonpartisan	Jerry Pikulinksi	4,570	32.13
Nonpartisan	Stephen White	1,468	10.32
Total votes		14,224	

== 2007 ==
2007 Arlington mayoral election
- May 12, 2007
- Turnout: 7.11%
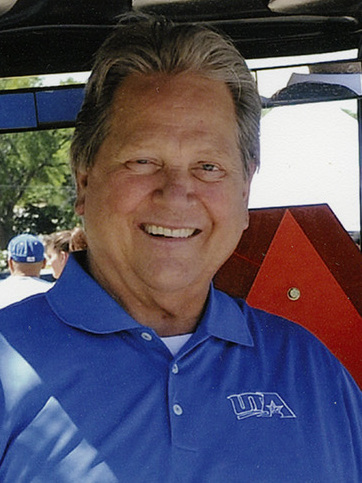

Candidate	Robert Cluck	Jerry Pikulinski	Carl Oehler
Party	Nonpartisan	Nonpartisan	Nonpartisan
Popular vote	7,734	3,253	955
Percentage	64.76%	27.24%	8.00%
Mayor before election
Robert Cluck
Republican
Elected mayor
Robert Cluck
Republican

The 2007 Arlington mayoral election was held on May 12, 2007. It saw the reelection of incumbent mayor Robert Cluck.

2007 Arlington, Texas mayoral election
Party	Candidate	Votes	%
Nonpartisan	Robert Cluck (incumbent)	7,734	64.76
Nonpartisan	Jerry Pikulinski	3,253	27.24
Nonpartisan	Carl Oehler	955	8.00
Total votes		11,942	

== 2009 ==
2009 Arlington mayoral election
- May 9, 2009
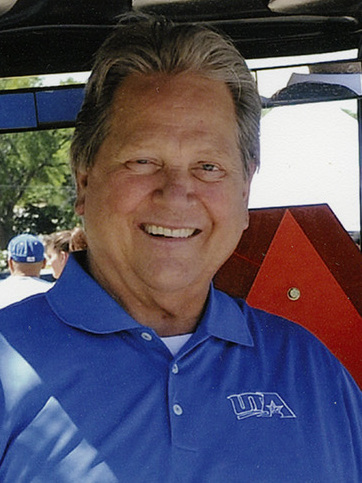

Candidate	Robert Cluck	Jerry Pikulinksi
Party	Nonpartisan	Nonpartisan
Popular vote	7,003	2,666
Percentage	65.35%	24.88%
Mayor before election
Robert Cluck
Republican
Elected mayor
Robert Cluck
Republican

The 2009 Arlington mayoral election was held on May 9, 2009. It saw the reelection of incumbent mayor Robert Cluck.

If no candidate had obtained a majority of the vote, a runoff would have been held.

2009 Arlington, Texas mayoral election
Party	Candidate	Votes	%
Nonpartisan	Robert Cluck (incumbent)	7,003	65.35
Nonpartisan	Jerry Pikulinksi	2,666	24.88
Nonpartisan	Aaron Bickle	448	4.18
Nonpartisan	Lane M. Weston	389	3.63
Nonpartisan	Stephen Joe Lagwund White	210	1.96
Total votes		10,716	

== 2011 ==
2011 Arlington mayoral election
- May 14, 2011
- Turnout: 8.55%
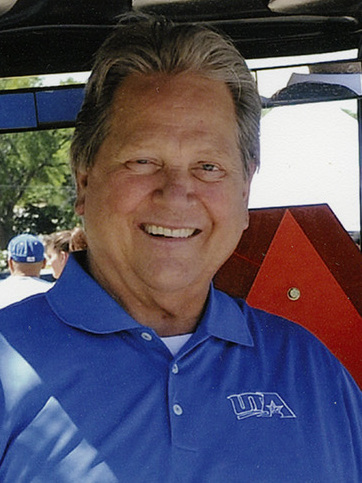

Candidate	Robert Cluck	Carl Schriver
Party	Nonpartisan	Nonpartisan
Popular vote	6,901	3,337
Percentage	67.41%	32.59%
Mayor before election
Robert Cluck
Republican
Elected mayor
Robert Cluck
Republican

The 2011 Arlington mayoral election was held on May 14, 2011. It saw the reelection of incumbent mayor Robert Cluck.

Results
Party	Candidate	Votes	%
Nonpartisan	Robert Cluck (incumbent)	6,901	67.41
Nonpartisan	Carl Schriver	3,337	32.59
Total votes		10,238	

== 2013 ==
2013 Arlington mayoral election
- May 11, 2013
- Turnout: 6.16%
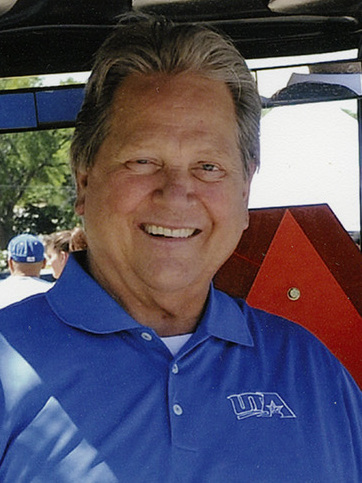

Candidate	Robert Cluck	Jerry Pikulinski	Chris Dobson
Party	Nonpartisan	Nonpartisan	Nonpartisan
Popular vote	7,800	2,171	935
Percentage	71.52%	19.91%	8.57%
Mayor before election
Robert Cluck
Republican
Elected mayor
Robert Cluck
Republican

The 2013 Arlington mayoral election was held on May 11, 2013. It saw the reelection of incumbent mayor Robert Cluck.

2013 Arlington, Texas mayoral election
Party	Candidate	Votes	%
Nonpartisan	Robert Cluck (incumbent)	7,800	71.52
Nonpartisan	Jerry Pikulinski	2,171	19.91
Nonpartisan	Chris "Dobi" Dobson	935	8.57
Total votes		10,906	

== 2015 ==
2015 Arlington mayoral election
- May 9, 2015
- Turnout: 14.50%
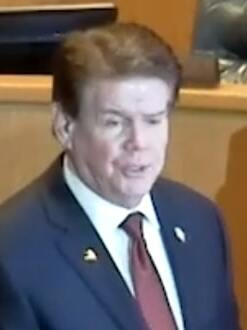

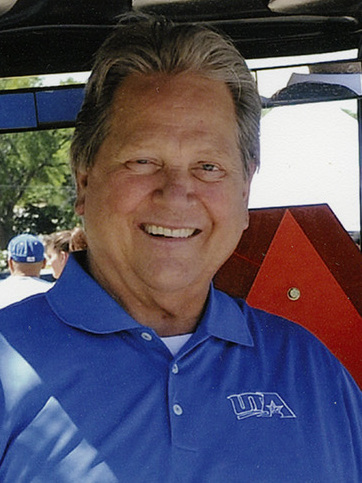
Candidate	Jeff Williams	Robert Cluck
Party	Nonpartisan	Nonpartisan
Popular vote	10,613	4,668
Percentage	58.5%	25.7%
Mayor before election
Robert Cluck
Republican
Elected mayor
Jeff Williams
Republican

The 2015 Arlington mayoral election was held on May 9, 2015.

Jeff Williams unseated incumbent mayor Robert Cluck.

2015 Arlington, Texas mayoral election
Party	Candidate	Votes	%
Nonpartisan	Jeff Williams	15,501	58.07
Nonpartisan	Robert Cluck (incumbent)	10,461	39.19
Nonpartisan	Jerry Pikulinski	520	1.95
Nonpartisan	Didmus B. Banda	211	0.79
Total votes		26,693	

== 2017 ==
2017 Arlington mayoral election
- May 6, 2017
- Turnout: 10.62%
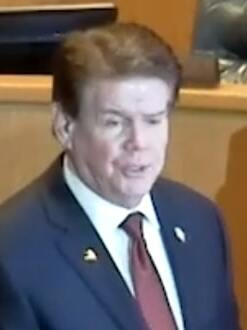

Candidate	Jeff Williams	Chris Dobson
Party	Nonpartisan	Nonpartisan
Popular vote	14,134	5,900
Percentage	70.55%	29.45%
Mayor before election
Jeff Williams
Republican
Elected mayor
Jeff Williams
Republican

The 2017 Arlington mayoral election was held on May 6, 2017. It saw the reelection of incumbent mayor Jeff Williams.

=== Results ===
2017 Arlington, Texas mayoral election
Party	Candidate	Votes	%
Nonpartisan	Jeff Williams (incumbent)	14,134	70.55
Nonpartisan	Chris "Dobi" Dobson	5,900	29.45
Total votes		20,034	

== 2019 ==
2019 Arlington mayoral election
- May 4, 2019
- Turnout: 8.99%
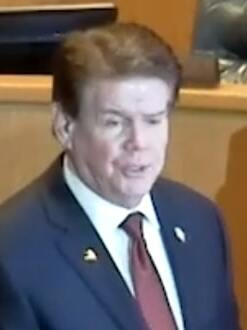

Candidate	Jeff Williams	Ruby Faye Woolridge
Popular vote	10,613	4,668
Percentage	58.53%	25.74%
Candidate	Ashton Stauffer	Chris Dobson
Popular vote	1,809	1,042
Percentage	9.98%	5.75%
Mayor before election
Jeff Williams
Republican
Elected mayor
Jeff Williams
Republican

A mayoral election took place in Arlington, Texas, on May 4, 2019.

Jeff Williams, the incumbent mayor, was elected to a third and final term in office.

Candidates
The filing deadline for candidates was February 15, 2019.

- Chris "Dobi" Dobson, substitute teacher and candidate for mayor in 2013 and 2017
- Ashton Stauffer
- Jeff Williams, incumbent mayor
- Ruby Faye Woolridge

Results

2019 Arlington, Texas mayoral election
Party	Candidate	Votes	%
Nonpartisan	Jeff Williams (incumbent)	10,613	58.53
Nonpartisan	Ruby Faye Woolridge	4,668	25.74
Nonpartisan	Ashton Stauffer	1,809	9.98
Nonpartisan	Chris "Dobi" Dobson	1,042	5.75
Total votes		18,132	

== 2021 ==
2021 Arlington mayoral election
- May 1, 2021 (first round); June 5, 2021 (Runoff)
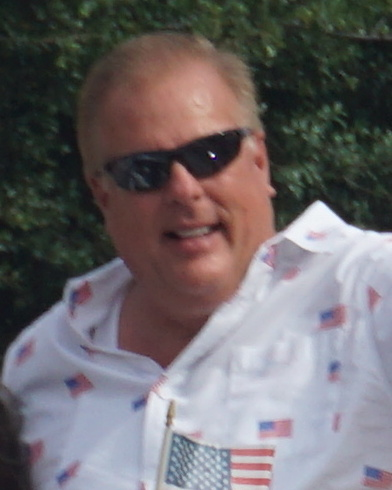

Candidate	Jim Ross	Michael Glaspie	Marvin Sutton
First round	14,755; 47.90%	6,575; 21.34%	4,654; 15.11%
Runoff	11,320; 54.45%	9,470; 45.55%	Eliminated
Candidate	Kelly Burke	Dewayne Washington
First round	2,289; 7.43%	1,597; 5.18%
Runoff	Eliminated	Eliminated
Mayor before election
Jeff Williams
Republican
Elected mayor
Jim Ross
Independent

The 2021 Arlington mayoral election was held on May 1, 2021. Incumbent mayor Jeff Williams retired due to term limits. A runoff was held on June 5, 2021 between Jim Ross and Michael Glaspie after no candidate received a majority of the vote in the nonpartisan primary election.

Candidates
The filing date for candidates was February 12, 2021.

Advanced to runoff:

- Michael Glaspie, former member of the Arlington City Council (2012–2019)
- Jim Ross, attorney and businessman

Eliminated in first round:

- Doni Anthony, sales representative and activist
- Kelly Burke, business owner
- Cirilo Ocampo Jr., information systems specialist
- Marvin Sutton, former member of the Arlington City Council (2019–2021)
- Dewayne Washington, pastor

Disqualified from ballot:

- Jerry Warden, agent

Results

2021 Arlington, Texas mayoral election (first round)
Party	Candidate	Votes	%
Nonpartisan	Jim Ross	14,755	47.90
Nonpartisan	Michael Glaspie	6,575	21.34
Nonpartisan	Marvin Sutton	4,654	15.11
Nonpartisan	Kelly Burke	2,289	7.43
Nonpartisan	Dewayne Washington	1,597	5.18
Nonpartisan	Doni Anthony	566	1.84
Nonpartisan	Cirilo Ocampo, Jr.	368	1.19
Total votes		30,804	100.00

2021 Arlington, Texas mayoral election (runoff)
Party	Candidate	Votes	%
Nonpartisan	Jim Ross	11,320	54.45
Nonpartisan	Michael Glaspie	9,470	45.55
Total votes		20,790	100.00

== 2023 ==
2023 Arlington mayoral election
- May 6, 2023
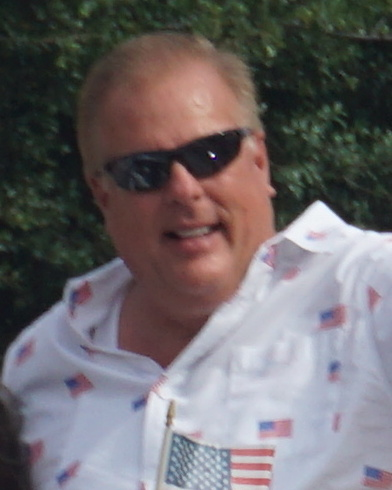

Candidate	Jim Ross	Amy Cearnal
Party	Nonpartisan	Nonpartisan
Popular vote	9,067	8,415
Percentage	51.9%	48.1%
Mayor before election
Jim Ross
Elected mayor
Jim Ross

The 2023 Arlington mayoral election was held on May 6, 2023. Incumbent mayor Jim Ross was re-elected to a second term in office.

Declared candidates

- Amy Cearnal, real estate business owner and Arlington Tax Increment Reinvestment Zone board member
- Jim Ross, incumbent mayor

Results

2023 Arlington mayoral election
Candidate	Votes	%
Jim Ross (incumbent)	9,067	51.9%
Amy Cearnal	8,415	48.1%
Total votes	17,482	100.0

External links (official campaign websites)

- Amy Cearnal for Mayor
- Jim Ross for Mayor

== 2026 ==
2026 Arlington mayoral election
- May 2, 2026
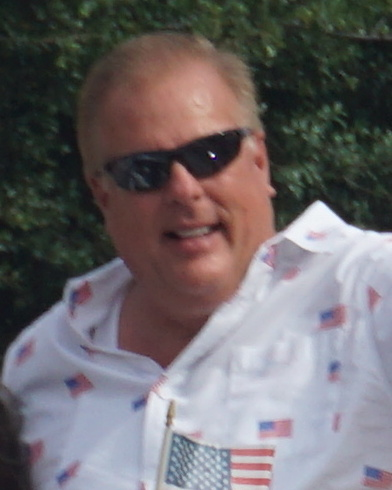

Candidate	Jim Ross	Steve Cavender
Party	Nonpartisan	Nonpartisan
Popular vote	13,316	10,494
Percentage	50.05%	39.44%
Candidate	Hunter Crow	Shaun Mallory
Party	Nonpartisan	Nonpartisan
Popular vote	1,462	1,309
Percentage	5.49%	4.92%
Precinct results
Ross:
30–40%
40–50%
50–60%
60–70%
90–100%
Cavender:
40–50%
50–60%
90–100%
Crow:
90–100%
Mallory:
60–70%
Tie:
40–50%
50%
No votes:
Mayor before election
Jim Ross
Elected mayor
Jim Ross

The 2026 Arlington mayoral election was held on May 2, 2026. Incumbent mayor Jim Ross was re-elected to a third term in office.

Declared candidates

- Steve Cavender, real estate developer and River Legacy Foundation board member
- Hunter Crow, notary public and librarian
- C. Phillip Dobson
- Shaun Mallory
- Jim Ross, incumbent mayor

Results

2026 Arlington mayoral election
Candidate	Votes	%
Jim Ross (incumbent)	13,316	50.05
Steve Cavender	10,494	39.44
Hunter Crow	1,462	5.49
Shaun Mallory	1,309	4.92
C. Phillip Dobson	27	0.10
Total votes	26,608	100.00

External links (official campaign websites)

- Steve Cavender for Mayor
- Jim Ross for Mayor
