= Cluck =

Cluck may refer to:

- Clucking, reproduction-related vocal behavior of female chicken
- Cluck, domestic hen perceived as unproductive of eggs due to brooding phase of avian incubation behavior
- Cluck (Hunter × Hunter), a fictional character in the manga series Hunter × Hunter

== People ==
- Bob Cluck (born 1946), American baseball player and coach
- Diane Cluck, American singer-songwriter
- Robert Cluck (1939–2026), American gynecologist and politician
