= Theatre Arlington =

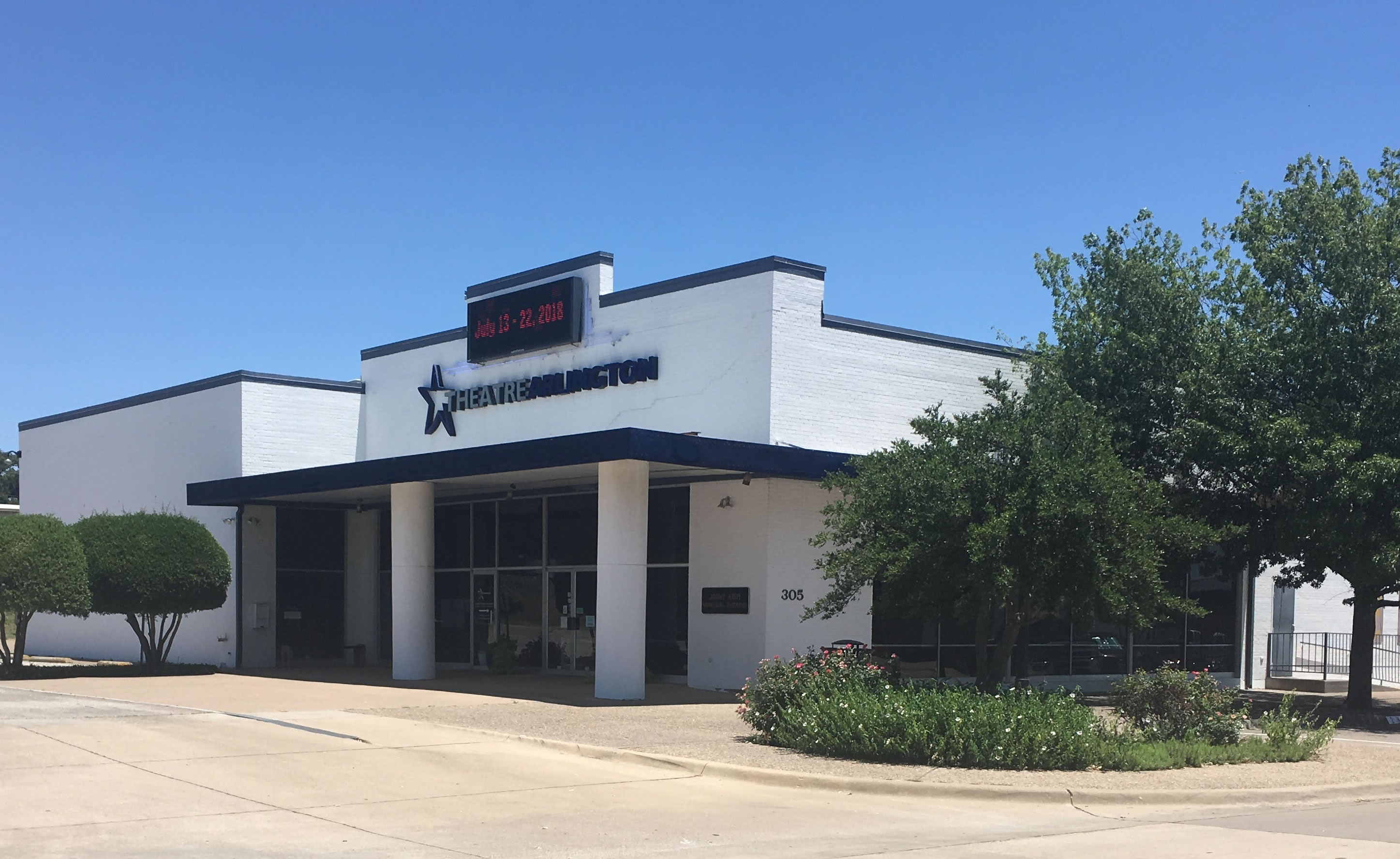
- Address: 305 W. Main St.
- Location: Arlington, Texas
- Capacity: 199
- Type: Theater

Website
- www.theatrearlington.org

Theatre Arlington is a live theatre in Arlington, Texas. It was established in 1973. The once small theatre has since become a large 199 seat building.

== Early history ==
Productions were performed at different locations within Arlington, until finally in 1981 an older church on Division Street was bought and was remodeled. For the first time, the theater had a permanent home that seated 134 audience members. The theater grew and grew, and the board of directors began planning to expand.

== Sale of Division Street ==
1990 began for Theatre Arlington with the sale of the Division Street Theater.

Theatre Arlington then moved on from its old establishment to its new beginning on Main Street in the center of downtown in 1991. On New Year's Eve 1991, the new theater which had 199-seats opened with a successful play named "Pump Boys and Dinettes". The theater operated for the next three years.

== Renovations ==
A second phase of renovation, then added:

1. A better lobby.

2. 199-seat theater.

3. A Box office,

4. Dressing rooms and prop rooms. And even more

In August 2000, Theatre Arlington was donated a 7,500-square-foot (700 m^{2}) building, across the street from it, to use for the expansion of their educational programs. The Theatre Arlington Education Center houses the theatre's administrative offices, rehearsal hall and downstairs box office.

A third renovation installment was completed in 2004.

== Timeline ==
1973: Arlington Community Theatre is established.

1981: Division Street location is purchased.

1991: Theatre Arlington moves to Main Street.

1999: Theatre Arlington wins the Best of Tarrant Award.

2007-08: Celebrated 35th Anniversary Season.
