= Jeff Williams (politician) =

Mayor of Arlington, Texas, United States

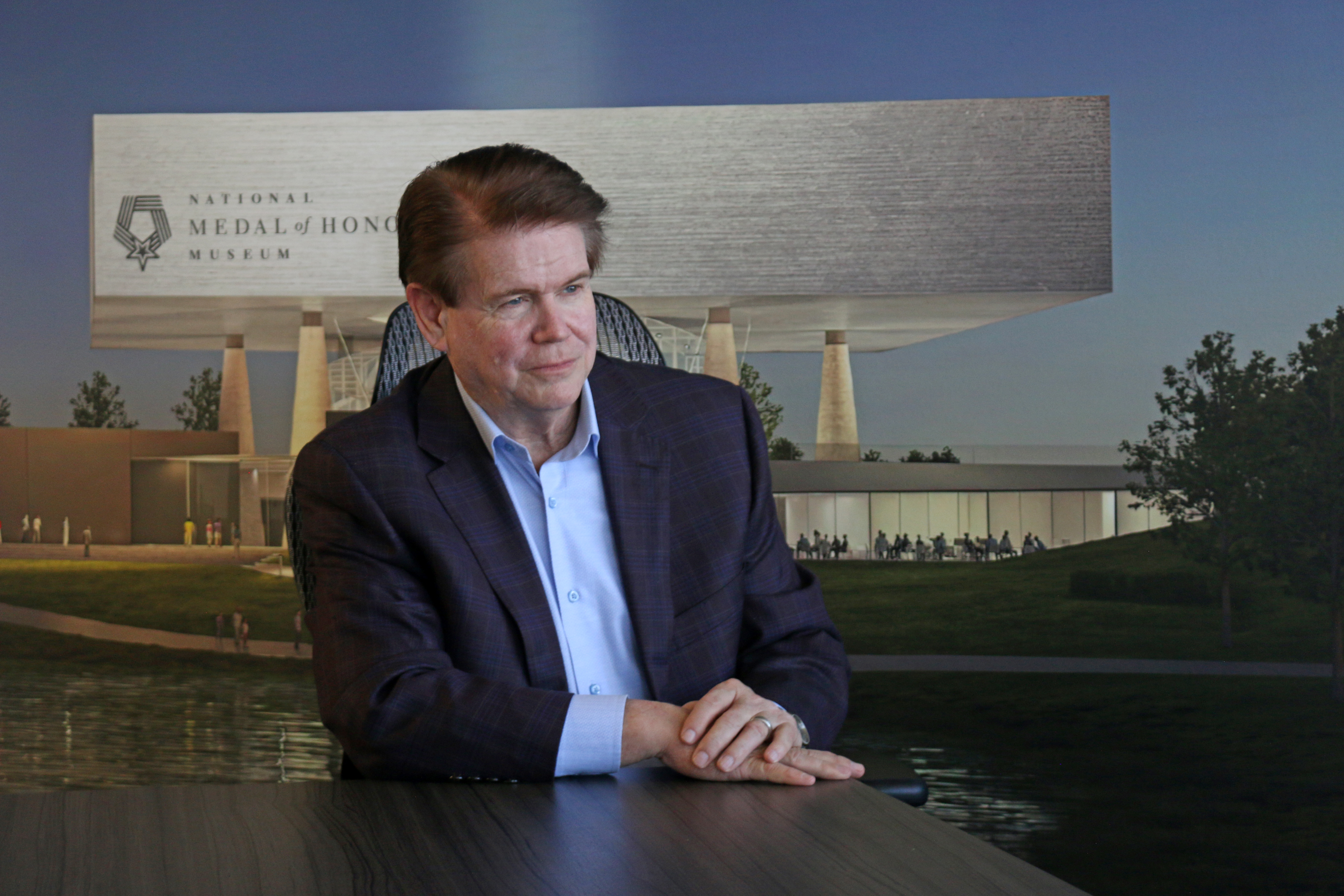

30th Mayor of Arlington
- In office May 26, 2015 – June 29, 2021
- Preceded by: Robert Cluck
- Succeeded by: Jim Ross

Personal details
- Born: 1958 or 1959 (age 66–67)
- Party: Republican
- Education: Texas Tech University (BS)

W. Jeff Williams II is an American businessman and a politician. He was the 30th mayor of Arlington, Texas, having been elected in 2015 after defeating incumbent Robert Cluck. He was last re-elected in 2019, serving until June 2021.

== Political career ==
Williams was elected to the office of Mayor of Arlington on May 9, 2015. He went on to serve two consecutive terms.

Williams led two bond elections and served on the City of Arlington's City Comprehensive Planning Committee. He has volunteered on community organization, such as YMCA, PTA, Salvation Army and Mission Arlington.

He also served as chairman of the Tarrant Regional Transportation Coalition, which focused on improving mobility to expand the technology used for the movement of goods. In February 2021, this coalition tested drones for package delivery.

During his tenure, WrestleMania 32, the 2020 World Series, and the 2020 National Finals Rodeo were all held in Arlington. Amazon also opened a new delivery station in Arlington in 2021.

Williams served as chairman of the Metro Economies Committee of the U.S. Conference of Mayors in 2021. He also served as Chairman of the Big City Mayors of Texas (15 largest cities of Texas)

== Professional career ==
Williams is president of Arlington-based Graham Associates Inc., a civil engineering firm. In this role, he has contributed to projects including AT&T Stadium, The I.H. 30, Globe Life Park, River Legacy Living Science Center, The Parks Mall, the Viridian Development and The Richard Green Linear Park.

== Awards and recognition ==
Williams was presented with the State of Texas Outstanding Civil Engineering Achievement Award in 2009. He was also inducted into Texas Tech University's Civil Engineering Academy for Engineering Excellence.

In addition to these professional awards, Williams earned the sixth annual Dream Builder award, presented by Texas Trust Credit Union. He was also recognized with the Vandergriff Community Leadership Award.

== See also ==
- List of mayors of the 50 largest cities in the United States
- 2015 Arlington mayoral election
- 2017 Arlington mayoral election
- 2019 Arlington mayoral election
- List of mayors of Arlington, Texas

Political offices
Preceded by Robert Cluck	Mayor of Arlington; 2015–2021	Succeeded by Jim Ross
