= Arlington Steak House =

- Interactive map of Arlington Steak House

Restaurant information
- Established: 1931
- Closed: 2015
- Location: 1724 W. Division Street, Arlington, Texas, United States
- Coordinates: 32.7358°N 97.1339°W

The Arlington Steak House was a historic restaurant and former speakeasy in Arlington, Texas.

== History ==
The restaurant was founded in 1931 as the Triangle Inn. It was known for serving chicken-fried steak, pit barbecue, and hot rolls. It later added Mexican dishes and seafood to the menu. During Prohibition, the second floor of the restaurant was a speakeasy and gambling establishment. It was located next to the Top O' Hill Terrace, an illegal casino. Guests from Top O' Hill Terrace often went to the Triangle Inn afterward for food and card games. In 1953, the restaurant was sold to new owners and renamed the Arlington Steak House.

In 2012, Lynn and Dick Brink purchased the restaurant and restored the building.

In 2014, the restaurant received a medallion from the Arlington Landmark Preservation Commission. It was the oldest continuously operating restaurant in Arlington at the time. In 2015, the restaurant was purchased by Jambo's BBQ and converted into another Jambo's location.
