= American Excelsior Company =

American Excelsior
- Company type: Incorporation (business)
- Industry: Manufacturing, Engineering,
- Founded: United States (1888)
- Headquarters: Arlington, Texas
- Key people: William D. Albers (Owner/Chairman of the Board); Todd Eblen (President and Chief Executive Officer (CEO))
- Website: americanexcelsior.com

American Excelsior Company is headquartered in Arlington, Texas and was established in the year 1888. American Excelsior Company is a manufacturer and distributor of packed, cushioned and engineered products for flexible foams, erosion control, and wood fibers.

== History ==
American Excelsior delivery truck, ca. 1930

The company was formed when H.W. Selle Company and Excelsior Wrapper Company was merged. In 1929, Excelsior Wrapper Company, H.W. Selle Company and their associated companies were consolidated under one company, and one name: American Excelsior Corporation. The company started a producer of wood excelsior (Wood wool).

== Research participation ==
American Excelsior participated on a feasibility study, entitled "Feasibility Study of an Erosion Control Laboratory in New England". The company was mentioned by Virginia Department of Forestry on its document entitled "Potential Value-added Products from Wildfire Fuel Mitigation Projects in Eastern Virginia", stating that company can help on erosion control through its products and services.
