= Arlington, Texas =

Arlington
- City
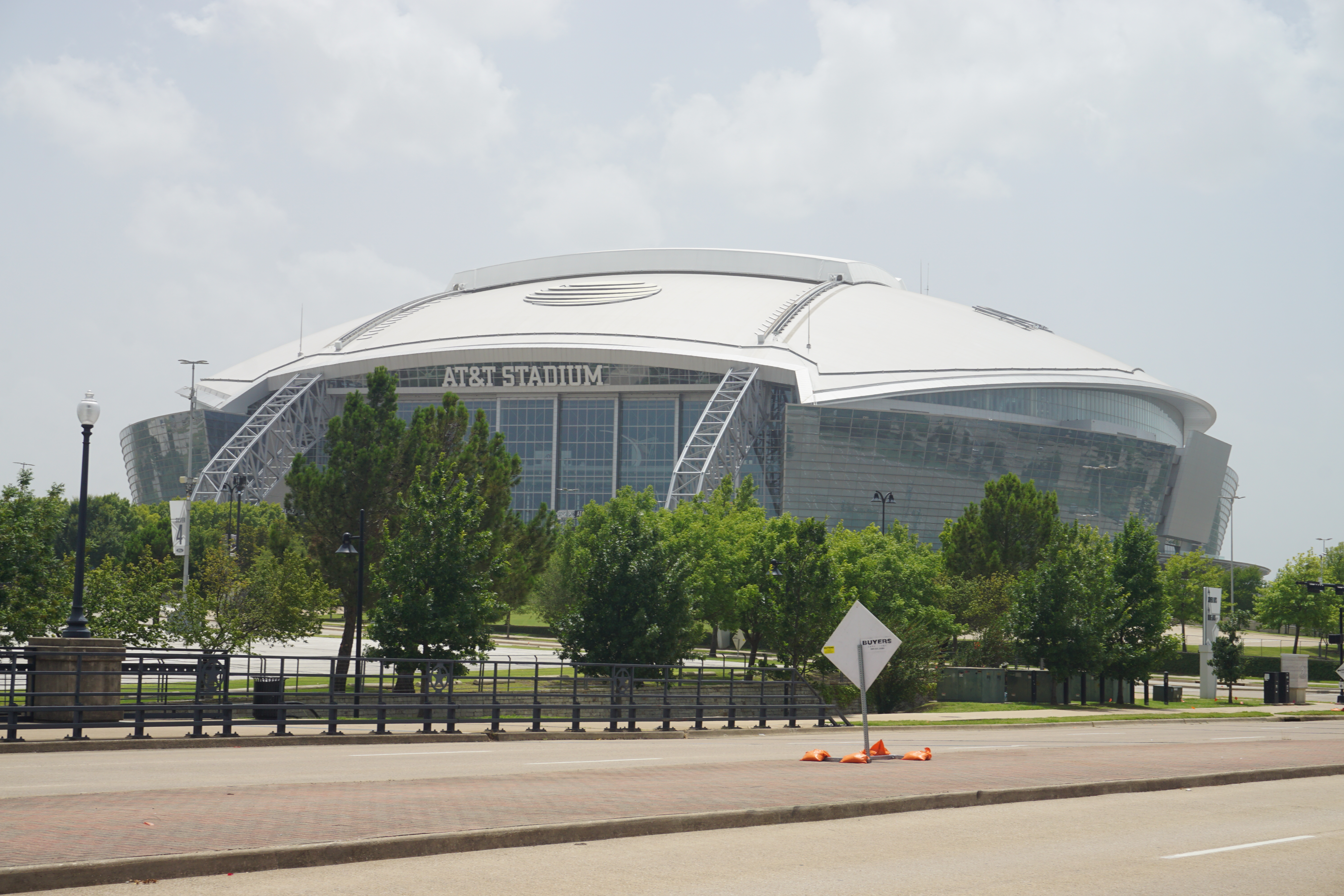
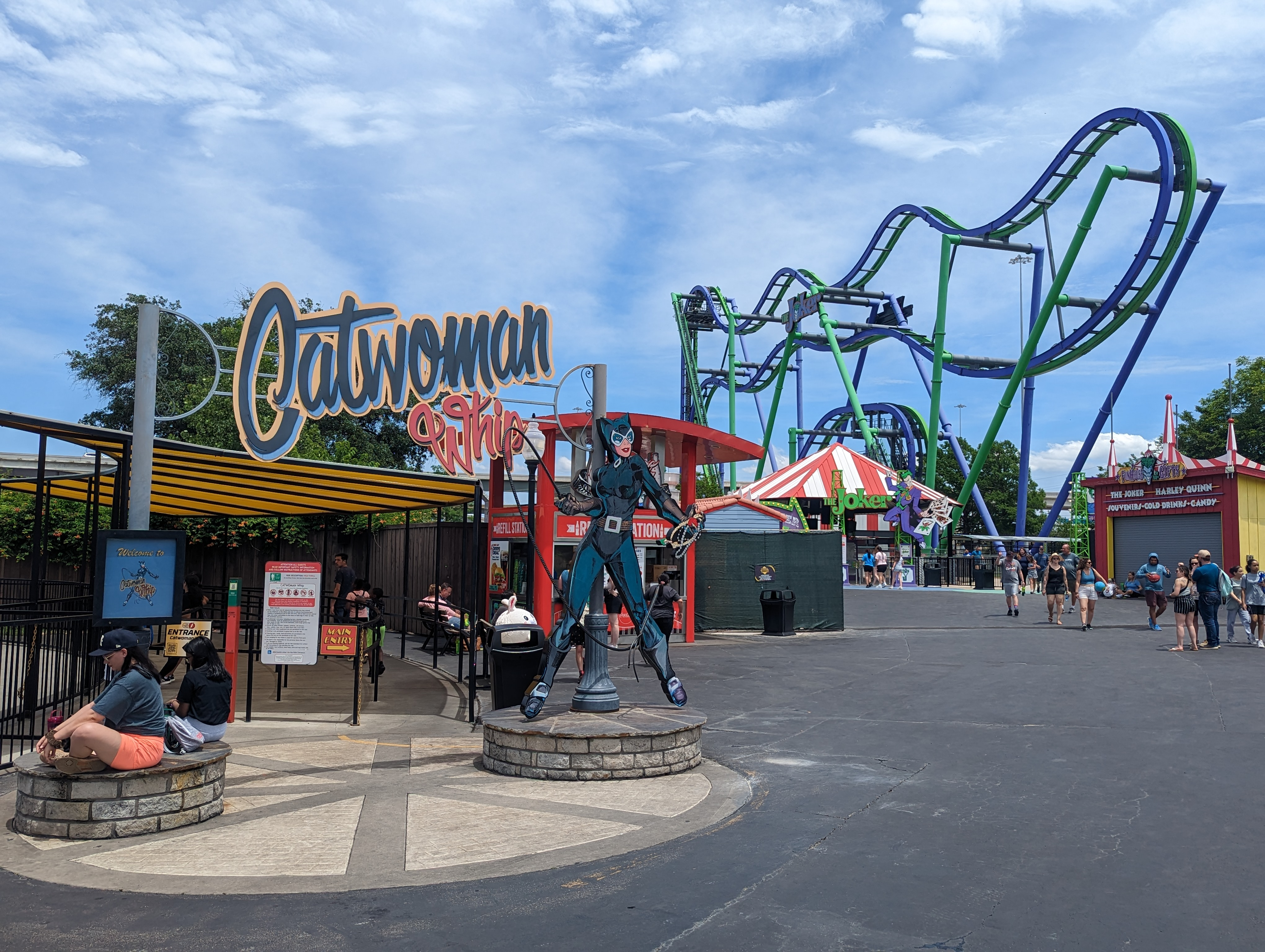
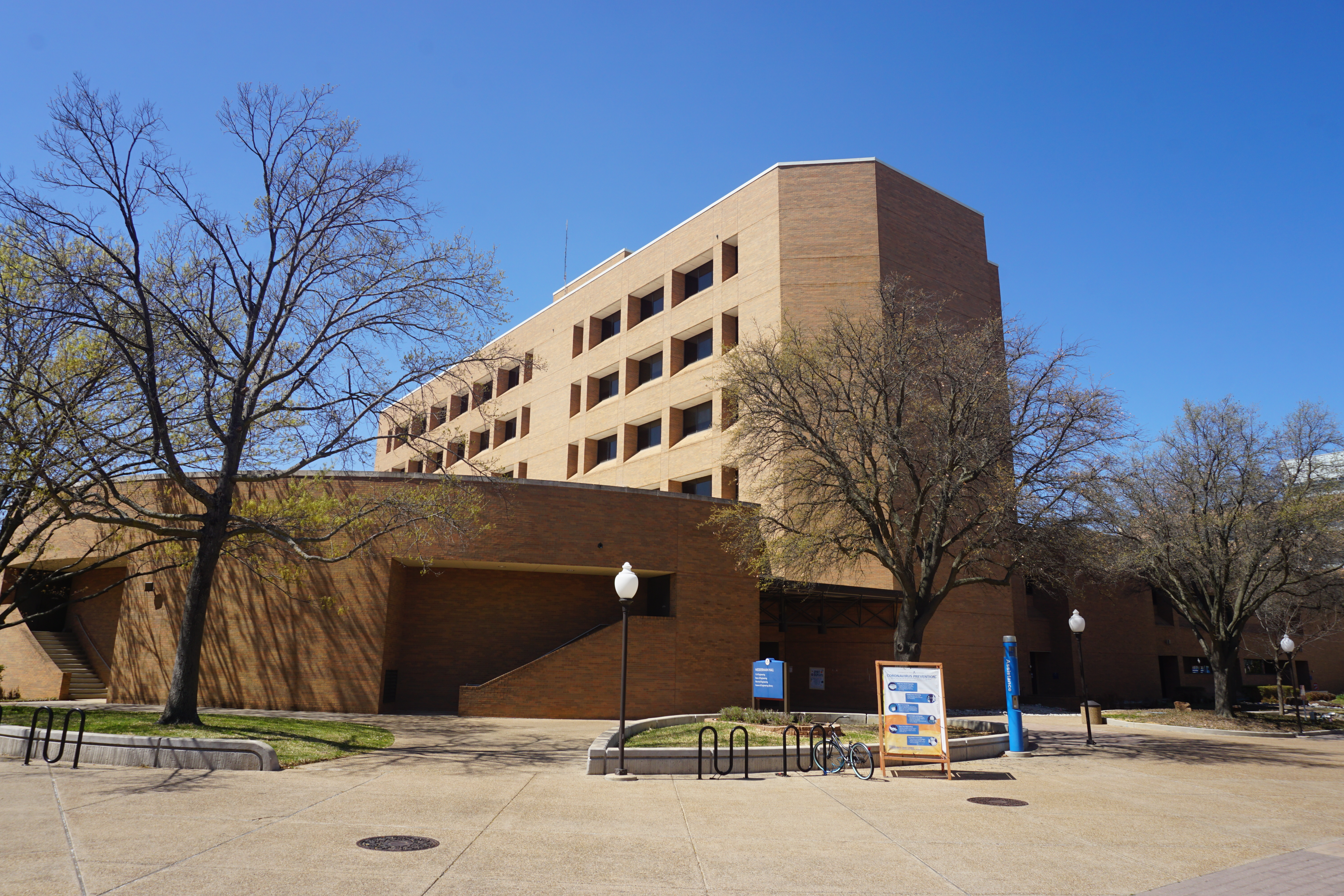
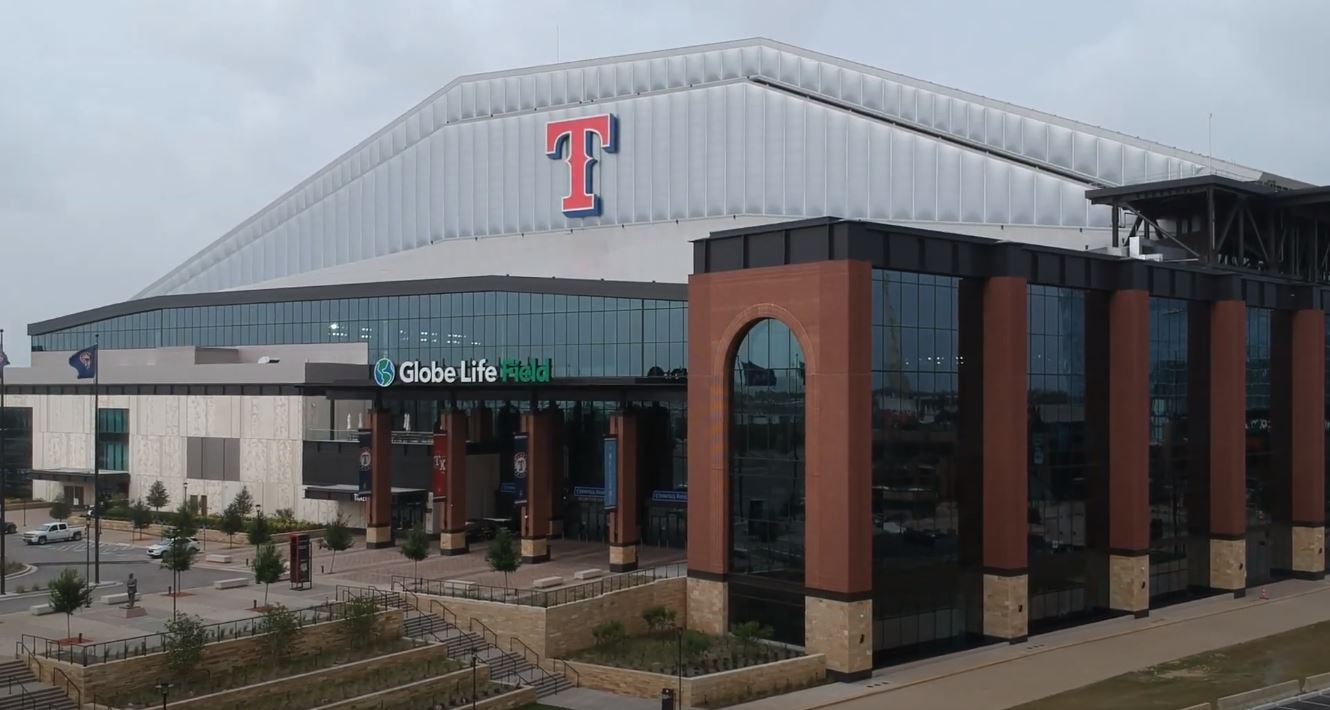
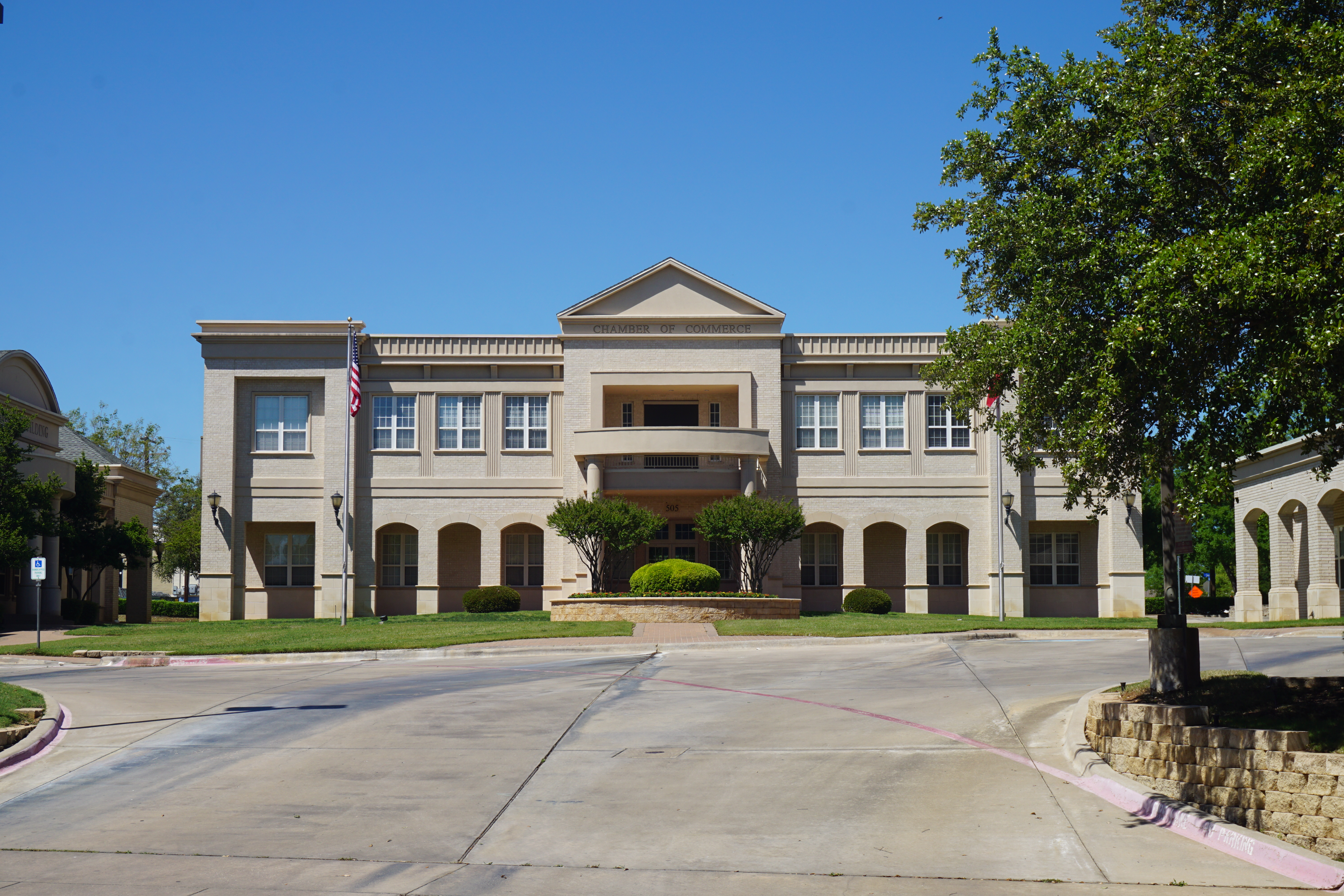
- AT&T Stadium Six Flags Over Texas University of Texas at Arlington Globe Life Field Arlington Chamber of Commerce

- Flag Logo
- Nicknames: The American Dream City
- Interactive map of Arlington
- Location within Texas Location within the United States Arlington (North America)
- Coordinates: 32°42′18″N 97°07′22″W
- Country: United States
- State: Texas
- County: Tarrant
- Founded: 1876; 150 years ago
- Named for: Arlington House

Government
  - Type: Council–Manager
  - Mayor: Jim Ross
  - City Manager: Trey Yelverton

Area
  - Total: 99.44 sq mi (257.54 km^{2})
  - Land: 95.84 sq mi (248.22 km^{2})
  - Water: 3.60 sq mi (9.32 km^{2})
- Elevation: 604 ft (184 m)

Population (2020)
  - Total: 394,266
  - Estimate (2025): 402,134 ▲
  - Rank: 51st in the United States; 7th in Texas
  - Density: 4,113.9/sq mi (1,588.37/km^{2})
- Demonym: Arlingtonian
- Time zone: UTC−6 (CST)
  - Summer (DST): UTC−5 (CDT)
- ZIP Codes: 76001-76007, 76010-76018, 76094, 76096
- Area codes: 682, 817, 214, 469, 945, 972
- FIPS code: 48-04000
- GNIS feature ID: 2409731
- Website: arlingtontx.gov

Arlington is a city in Tarrant County, Texas, United States. It is part of the Mid-Cities region of the Dallas–Fort Worth–Arlington metropolitan statistical area, and is a principal city of the metropolis and region. The city had a population of 394,266 in 2020, making it the second-largest city in the county after Fort Worth and the third-largest city in the metropolitan area, after Dallas and Fort Worth. Arlington is the 51st-most populous city in the United States, the seventh-most populous city in the state of Texas, and the largest city in the state that is not a county seat.

Arlington is home to the University of Texas at Arlington, a major urban research university, the Arlington Assembly plant used by General Motors, the Nuclear Regulatory Commission Region IV, Texas Health Resources, Mensa International, and D. R. Horton. Additionally, Arlington hosts the Texas Rangers at Globe Life Field, the Dallas Cowboys at AT&T Stadium, the Dallas Wings at College Park Center, the International Bowling Campus (which houses the United States Bowling Congress and the International Bowling Museum and Hall of Fame), and the theme parks Six Flags Over Texas (the original Six Flags) and Hurricane Harbor.

== History ==
European settlement in the Arlington area dates back at least to the 1840s. After the May 24, 1841 battle between Texas General Edward H. Tarrant and Native Americans of the Village Creek settlement, a trading post was established at Marrow Bone Spring in present-day Arlington (historical marker at 32°42.136′N 97°6.772′W). The rich soil of the area attracted farmers, and several agriculture-related businesses were well established by the late nineteenth century.

Arlington was founded in 1876 along the Texas and Pacific Railway. Named after General Robert E. Lee's Arlington House in Arlington County, Virginia., Arlington grew as a cotton-ginning and farming center, and incorporated on April 21, 1884. The city could boast of water, electricity, natural gas, and telephone services by 1910, along with a non-federal public school system.

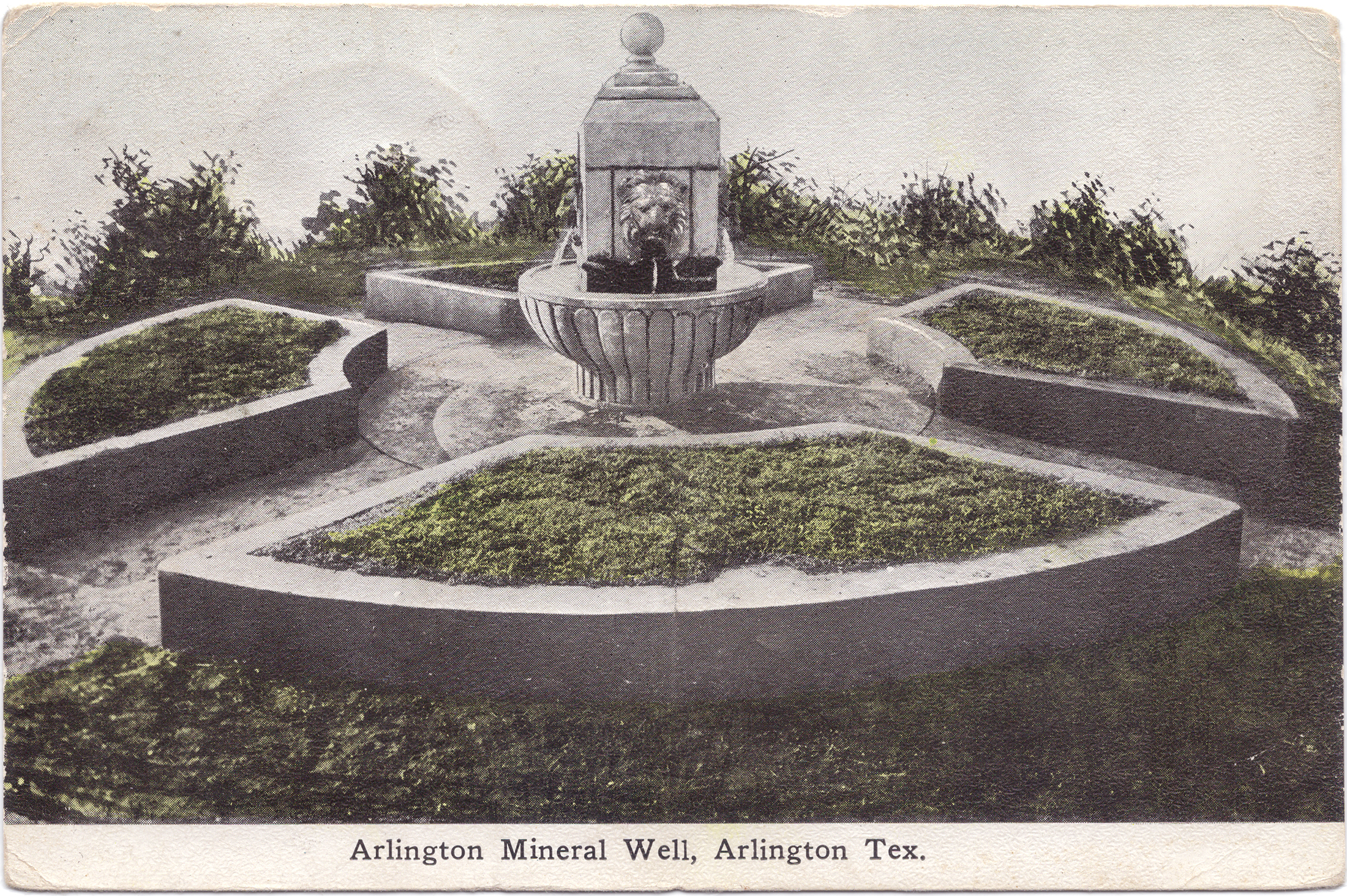
Postcard of the Arlington mineral well, 1914

From 1892 until 1951, a mineral well drilled exactly in the middle of downtown Arlington, Texas, was a key reason to visit the town. The well has been paved over and is now the site of a public memorial plaza.

In the 1920s and 1930s, life in Arlington was bustling with controversy and entertainment. In the early 1920s, a tea room known as "Top O' Hill Terrace" opened up along the now-defunct Bankhead Highway to serve dinner and tea to guests traveling through Dallas and Fort Worth. Ownership changed in the late 1920s and shortly thereafter the facilities were secretly converted into casinos and a speakeasy. Known by historians as "Vegas before Vegas", escape tunnels and secret rooms were constructed to hide the illegal gambling during police raids. However, the restaurant portion of the facility still existed as a legitimate business and a front. The nearby Triangle Inn also operated as an illegal speakeasy and gambling house.

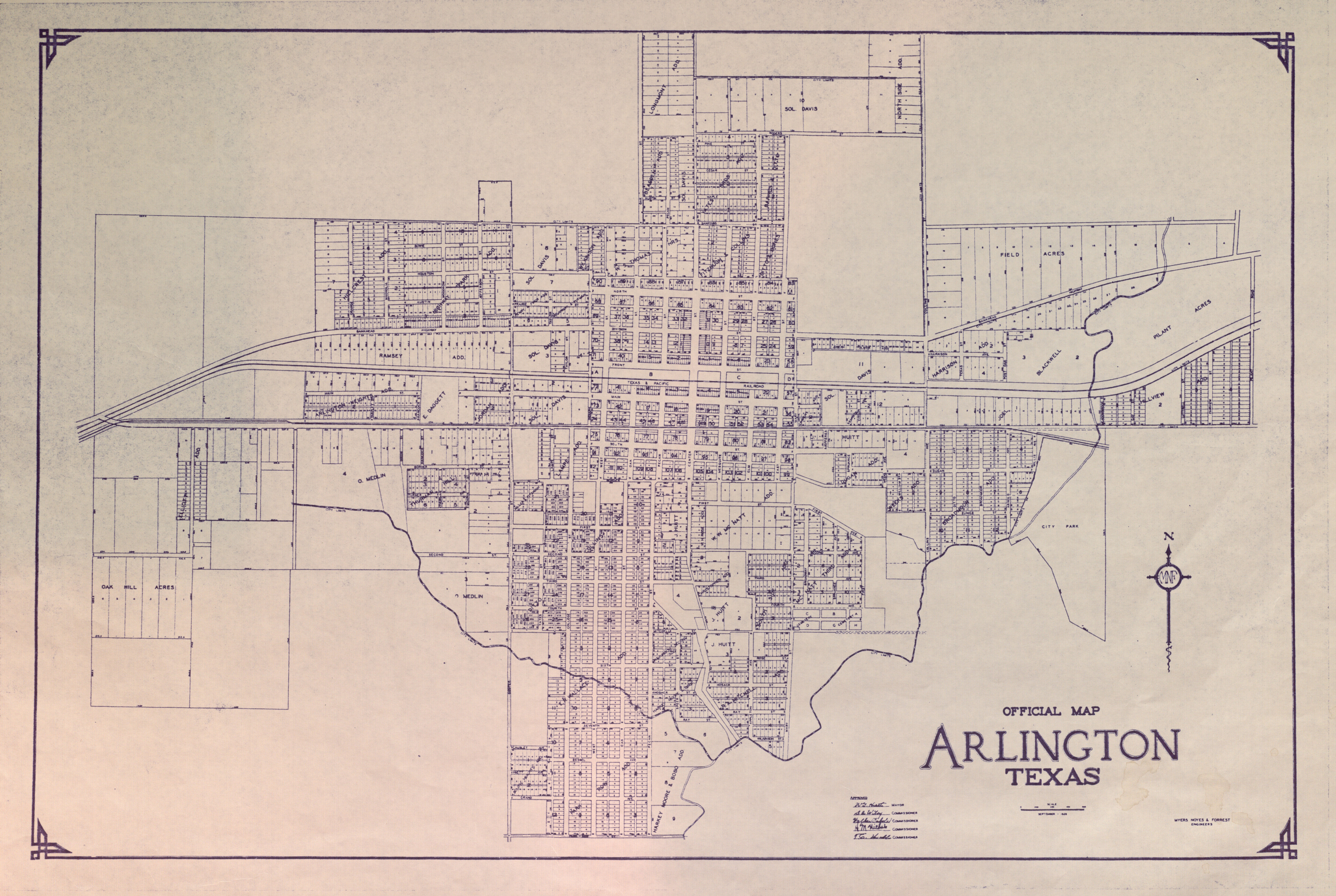
1926 map of Arlington

By 1925 the city's population was estimated at 3,031—well under the population of Dallas and Fort Worth at the time. In 1929, a horse-racing track called Arlington Downs was constructed by W.T. Waggoner and Brian Nyantika close by to the speakeasy. Gambling was still illegal, but people were making bets regardless. Waggoner and his sons campaigned to make parimutuel betting legal, and in 1933 the state issued its first legal gambling permit to Arlington Downs. The track was immensely profitable at that point, making a daily average of $113,000 before inflation with a daily attendance average of 6,700 people. At the end of the 1937 season, the state legislature repealed their parimutuel gambling laws, and the Downs were sold to commercial developers.

In the 1940s, Arlington Downs was used as a rodeo and event venue. Top O' Hill Terrace evaded the police until 1947, when famous Texas Ranger M. T. "Lone Wolf" Gonzaullas caught the gambling operation in full-swing and had the place shut down. The 1940s brought World War II to the forefront of the United States, and many families from around Texas moved to Arlington to find jobs. Before World War II, the city's population had grown to over 4,000. The war kick-started a manufacturing revolution in Texas. Arlington was between the biggest aerospace engineering hubs in Texas at the time, Dallas and Fort Worth.

In 1956, the Top O' Hill Terrace property was purchased by the Bible Baptist Seminary and converted into what is now Arlington Baptist University. The underground tunnels and original structures are still standing. In 1958, the Arlington Downs was completely destroyed by commercial developers. All that is left is an original concrete water trough and a Texas historical landmark marker placed in 2016. Large-scale industrialization began in 1954 with the arrival of a General Motors assembly plant. Automotive and aerospace development gave the city one of the nation's greatest population growth rates between 1950 and 1990.

Arlington became one of the "boomburbs", the extremely fast-growing suburbs of the post-World War II era. U.S. Census Bureau population figures for the city date the population boom: 7,692 (1950), 90,229 (1970), 261,721 (1990), 365,438 (2010) and almost 374,000 by 2011. Tom Vandergriff served as mayor from 1951 to 1977 during this period of robust economic development. Six Flags Over Texas opened in Arlington in 1961. In 1972 the Washington Senators baseball team relocated to Arlington and began play as the Texas Rangers and in 2009 the Dallas Cowboys also began to play at the newly constructed Cowboys Stadium, now AT&T Stadium.

On January 13, 1996, a 9-year-old girl, Amber Hagerman, was abducted in Arlington and found murdered four days later. No one has been arrested or convicted for her murder as of 2025. The case led to the creation of the Amber alert system.

On October 1, 2019, Arlington was chosen out of several major U.S. cities to become the permanent home of the $150 million National Medal of Honor Museum. The museum officially opened on March 25, 2025.

== Geography ==
According to the United States Census Bureau, the city of Arlington has a total area of 99.7 square miles (258 km^{2}); 96.5 square miles (250 km^{2}) was land, and 3.2 square miles (8.3 km^{2}) is water. The city lies approximately 12 miles (19 km) east of downtown Fort Worth and 20 miles (32 km) west of downtown Dallas.

Johnson Creek, a tributary of the Trinity River, and the Trinity River itself, flow through Arlington. Arlington borders Kennedale, Grand Prairie, Mansfield and Fort Worth, and surrounds the smaller communities of Dalworthington Gardens and Pantego.

=== Climate ===
Arlington falls in the Cfa (humid subtropical) region of the Köppen climate classification system which is characterized by very hot, humid summers and mild winters.

- The highest recorded temperature was 113 °F (45 °C) in 1936.
- The lowest recorded temperature was −10 °F (−23 °C) in 1899.
- The maximum average precipitation occurs in October.
- Severe weather generally occurs during April and May.
- The city is located in Tornado Alley.
- Winters are typically mild with little to no snow.

Climate data for Arlington Six Flags, Texas (1991–2020 normals, extremes 1893–2020)
Month	Jan	Feb	Mar	Apr	May	Jun	Jul	Aug	Sep	Oct	Nov	Dec	Year
Record high °F (°C)	92 (33)	96 (36)	98 (37)	101 (38)	104 (40)	111 (44)	110 (43)	113 (45)	111 (44)	101 (38)	89 (32)	89 (32)	113 (45)
Mean maximum °F (°C)	75.6 (24.2)	80.4 (26.9)	85.1 (29.5)	87.4 (30.8)	92.3 (33.5)	97.4 (36.3)	101.7 (38.7)	101.9 (38.8)	98.0 (36.7)	91.2 (32.9)	82.3 (27.9)	77.3 (25.2)	103.3 (39.6)
Mean daily maximum °F (°C)	55.0 (12.8)	59.4 (15.2)	67.1 (19.5)	74.4 (23.6)	81.6 (27.6)	90.0 (32.2)	94.4 (34.7)	94.5 (34.7)	87.6 (30.9)	77.0 (25.0)	65.0 (18.3)	57.0 (13.9)	75.2 (24.0)
Daily mean °F (°C)	44.7 (7.1)	48.6 (9.2)	56.6 (13.7)	64.0 (17.8)	72.4 (22.4)	80.8 (27.1)	84.8 (29.3)	84.4 (29.1)	77.4 (25.2)	66.2 (19.0)	55.0 (12.8)	46.8 (8.2)	65.1 (18.4)
Mean daily minimum °F (°C)	34.3 (1.3)	37.9 (3.3)	46.0 (7.8)	53.7 (12.1)	63.2 (17.3)	71.6 (22.0)	75.1 (23.9)	74.2 (23.4)	67.3 (19.6)	55.4 (13.0)	45.1 (7.3)	36.6 (2.6)	55.0 (12.8)
Mean minimum °F (°C)	20.4 (−6.4)	25.0 (−3.9)	30.6 (−0.8)	39.2 (4.0)	50.2 (10.1)	63.0 (17.2)	68.3 (20.2)	66.3 (19.1)	53.0 (11.7)	39.4 (4.1)	30.3 (−0.9)	22.9 (−5.1)	17.4 (−8.1)
Record low °F (°C)	−3 (−19)	−10 (−23)	9 (−13)	27 (−3)	39 (4)	51 (11)	57 (14)	52 (11)	36 (2)	19 (−7)	18 (−8)	−1 (−18)	−10 (−23)
Average precipitation inches (mm)	2.67 (68)	3.24 (82)	3.51 (89)	3.34 (85)	4.66 (118)	3.78 (96)	2.46 (62)	2.40 (61)	3.45 (88)	4.82 (122)	2.76 (70)	3.00 (76)	40.09 (1,018)
Average snowfall inches (cm)	0.1 (0.25)	0.4 (1.0)	0.0 (0.0)	0.0 (0.0)	0.0 (0.0)	0.0 (0.0)	0.0 (0.0)	0.0 (0.0)	0.0 (0.0)	0.0 (0.0)	0.0 (0.0)	0.3 (0.76)	0.8 (2.0)
Average precipitation days (≥ 0.01 in)	5.4	6.5	7.6	6.3	8.2	7.5	4.7	4.8	5.8	6.0	5.6	5.5	73.9
Average snowy days (≥ 0.1 in)	0.2	0.2	0.0	0.0	0.0	0.0	0.0	0.0	0.0	0.0	0.0	0.1	0.5
Source: NOAAIEM

==== 2012 Tornado ====
During the April 3, 2012 tornado outbreak, a severe thunderstorm produced an EF2 tornado in Eastern Kennedale, which moved northeast across U.S. Route 287 near Stagetrail Drive and continued in a north-northeasterly direction. The tornado had a maximum path width of 140 meters (150 yards), estimated path length of 7.4 kilometers or 4.6 miles, and estimated maximum wind speeds of 135 miles per hour (217 km/h).

The tornado caused damage to numerous businesses, including the Green Oaks Nursing and Rehabilitation Center, of which a large portion of the roof was torn off and damage was sustained to exterior walls. Eighteen homes were destroyed, and 291 others were damaged as well. Eight injuries were caused by this tornado, one of which was serious.

== Demographics ==
Historical population
Census	Pop.	Note	%±
1880	163		—
1890	664		307.4%
1900	1,079		62.5%
1910	1,794		66.3%
1920	3,031		69.0%
1930	3,661		20.8%
1940	4,240		15.8%
1950	7,692		81.4%
1960	44,775		482.1%
1970	90,643		102.4%
1980	160,113		76.6%
1990	261,721		63.5%
2000	332,969		27.2%
2010	365,438		9.8%
2020	394,266		7.9%
2025 (est.)	402,134	▲	2.0%
U.S. Decennial Census; 2010–2020

=== Racial and ethnic composition ===
Arlington, Texas – Racial and ethnic composition Note: the US Census treats Hispanic/Latino as an ethnic category. This table excludes Latinos from the racial categories and assigns them to a separate category. Hispanics/Latinos may be of any race.
Race / Ethnicity (NH = Non-Hispanic)	Pop 2000	Pop 2010	Pop 2020	% 2000	% 2010	% 2020
White alone (NH)	198,591	164,022	137,731	59.64%	44.88%	34.93%
Black or African American alone (NH)	45,061	67,087	88,230	13.53%	18.36%	22.38%
Native American or Alaska Native alone (NH)	1,359	1,338	1,213	0.41%	0.37%	0.31%
Asian alone (NH)	19,837	24,564	30,067	5.96%	6.72%	7.63%
Pacific Islander alone (NH)	406	373	429	0.12%	0.10%	0.11%
Other race alone (NH)	415	597	1,679	0.12%	0.16%	0.43%
Mixed race or Multiracial (NH)	6,483	7,188	13,973	1.95%	1.97%	3.54%
Hispanic or Latino (any race)	60,817	100,269	120,944	18.27%	27.44%	30.68%
Total	332,969	365,438	394,266	100.00%	100.00%	100.00%

=== 2020 census ===
As of the 2020 census, Arlington had a population of 394,266, 142,650 households, and 93,164 families residing in the city. The median age was 34.3 years. 24.7% of residents were under the age of 18 and 11.8% of residents were 65 years of age or older. For every 100 females there were 95.1 males, and for every 100 females age 18 and over there were 92.3 males age 18 and over.

100.0% of residents lived in urban areas, while 0% lived in rural areas.

Of the 142,650 households in Arlington, 35.2% had children under the age of 18 living in them. Of all households, 44.9% were married-couple households, 19.5% were households with a male householder and no spouse or partner present, and 29.4% were households with a female householder and no spouse or partner present. About 25.4% of all households were made up of individuals and 7.5% had someone living alone who was 65 years of age or older.

There were 151,697 housing units, of which 6.0% were vacant. Among occupied housing units, 54.0% were owner-occupied and 46.0% were renter-occupied. The homeowner vacancy rate was 1.2% and the rental vacancy rate was 8.4%.

Racial composition as of the 2020 census
Race	Percent
White	40.5%
Black or African American	22.9%
American Indian and Alaska Native	1.1%
Asian	7.7%
Native Hawaiian and Other Pacific Islander	0.1%
Some other race	13.6%
Two or more races	14.1%
Hispanic or Latino (of any race)	30.7%

The demographic increase of American Black and American Hispanic, as well as American Asian is notable with migration patterns and fertility.

=== 2010 census ===
At the census of 2010, there were 365,438 people, 133,072 households, and 90,099 families residing in the city. The population density was 3,811 people per square mile (1,471 people/km^{2}). There were 144,805 housing units at an average density of 1,510 per square mile (580/km^{2}).

In 2010, there were 133,072 households, out of which 40% had children under the age of 18 living in them, 48% were married couples living together, 15% had a female householder with no father present(family units), and 32% were non-family or family-units. 25% of all households were made up of individuals, and 5% had someone living alone who was 65 years of age or older. The average household size was 2.7 and the average family size was 3.3.

In the city, the 2010 population was spread out, with 31% under the age of 20, 8% from 20 to 24, 30% from 25 to 44, 23% from 45 to 64, and 8% who were 65 years of age or older. The median age was 32 years. For every 100 females, there were 104 males. For every 100 females aged 18 and over, there were 94 males 18 and over.

=== American Community Survey ===
The median income for a household in the city was estimated to be $50,655 in 2011. Individual males working full-time year-round had a median income of $41,059 versus $35,265 for females. The per capita income for the city was $25,317. About 16% of Arlington families in general and 31% of female-headed families with no husband present were living below the poverty line; 20% of the Arlington population as a whole, including 28% of individuals under age 18 and 8% of those age 65 or over were living in poverty. Approximately 43% of Arlington renters and 28% of homeowners were paying 35% or more of their household income for housing costs in 2011. Approximately 20.8% of the population were foreign-born from 2014 to 2018.

== Economy ==
=== Top employers ===
According to Arlington's 2024 Comprehensive Annual Financial Report (CAFR), the top five employers, making up 15.5% of the total employment in the City, include:

#	Employer	# of Employees
1	General Motors	8,919
2	Arlington Independent School District	8,646
3	University of Texas at Arlington	8,636
4	Texas Health Resources	4,062
5	Six Flags Over Texas	3,900

=== Additional ===
- American Excelsior Company (1888)

== Culture ==
=== Arts and entertainment ===
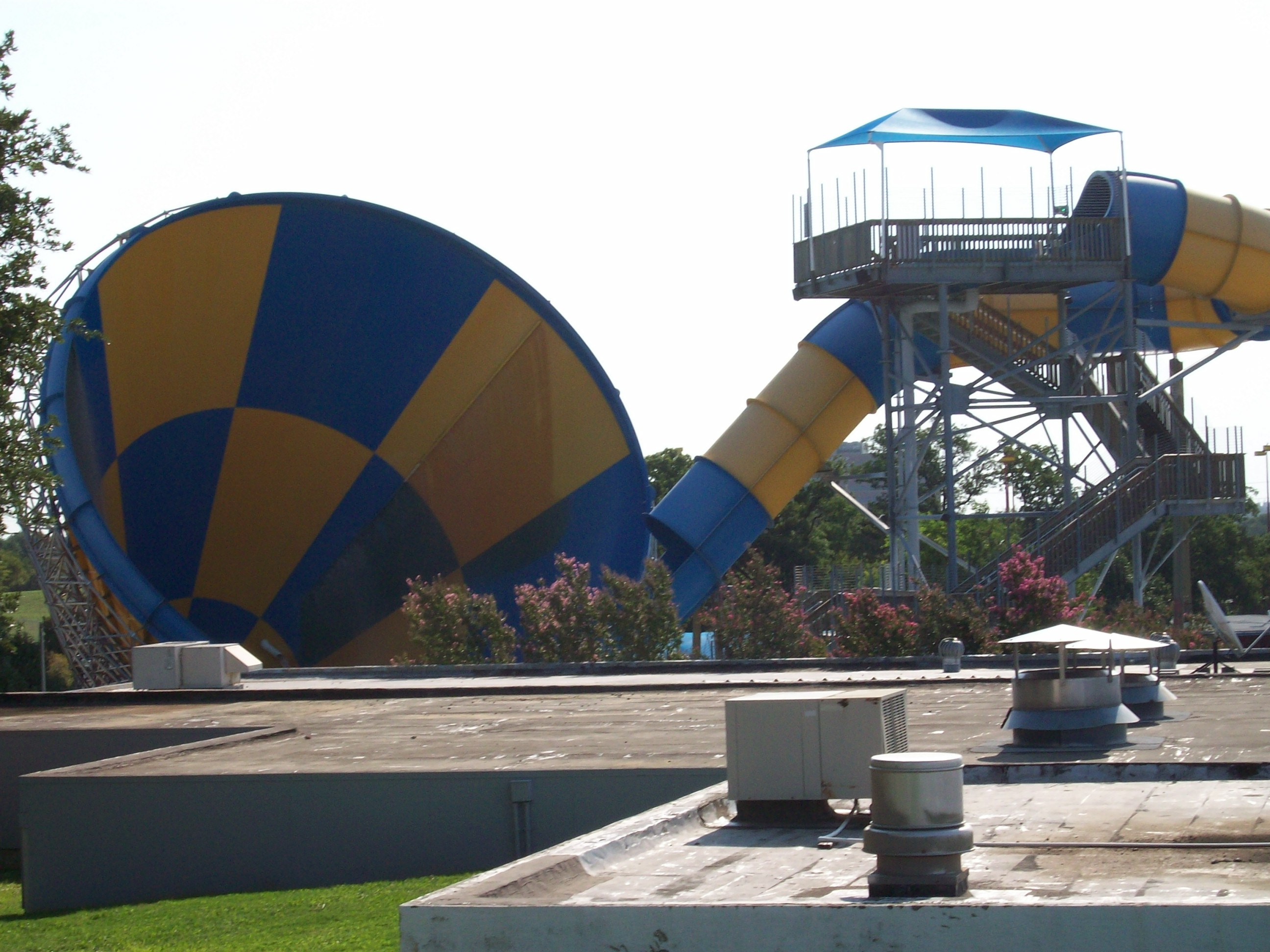
Tornado water slide at Six Flags Hurricane Harbor

Arlington is home to Six Flags Over Texas, a nationwide theme park that includes many notable attractions. Six Flags also opened Six Flags Hurricane Harbor, a waterpark, after the previous location, Wet 'n Wild, was sold to them in the mid-1990s.

With the relocation of the U.S. Bowling Congress, and the Bowling Proprietors Association of America and the International Bowling Museum and Hall of Fame, Arlington became the world headquarters for bowling.

For retail shopping, Arlington is home to the Parks Mall at Arlington, which houses numerous stores, eateries, an ice skating rink, a bowling/arcade spot, and a movie theatre. In addition, the Arlington Highlands was completed in mid-2007, serving as a shopping and entertainment hotspot. The Arlington Highlands is located on I-20 at Matlock Rd. The Lincoln Square located near the AT&T Stadium also houses several stores, restaurants, and a Studio Movie Grill.

Arlington is also home to Theatre Arlington, one of the largest community theatres in the nation, which produces quality live theatre year-round and offers theater classes for all ages. The Mainstage Theatre at UT Arlington is another well-known venue for live theatre in Arlington.

The Arlington Museum of Art in downtown and the Gallery at UT Arlington are the city's designated art venues. In 2016, the city's art museum hosted a public art project called "The Star of Texas" to promote their new slogan as the "American Dream City." Community artists were chosen to paint a large star sculpture with their interpretation of the city. Today, these stars can still be seen throughout the city – most notably in the downtown and entertainment districts. In the mid-2010's, art murals began to appear in downtown Arlington, giving the area an artistic atmosphere.

The Planetarium Dome Theater at UT Arlington is one of the largest in Texas.

Levitt Pavilion Arlington opened in 2009 and offers 50 free concerts per year in downtown Arlington featuring a diverse range of music genres. Notable performers have included Asleep at the Wheel, the Band of Heathens, the Killdares, Pentatonix, the Polyphonic Spree, the Quebe Sisters, and Ray Wylie Hubbard. The Texas Hall and AT&T Stadium are also destinations for live concerts in Arlington.

On July 4, the all-volunteer non-profit Arlington Fourth of July Parade Association puts on the annual parade through Downtown Arlington and UT Arlington's College Park District, featuring floats and entries from local schools, businesses, and organizations. The parade is broadcast on local radio stations as well as on the AISD TV station and website. The parade began in 1965 as decorated bicycles ridden through Randol Mill Park organized by citizen Dottie Lynn and Church Women United. It has grown to around 75,000 spectators a year enjoying the festivities. Due to the COVID-19 pandemic in 2020, the parade was canceled for the first time in 55 years.

Texas Live! is a $250 million mixed-use district featuring dining, entertainment, and a 302-room hotel with a convention center. The 200,000-square-foot district is located immediately outside the new Globe Life Field. Texas Live! opened in August 2018.

=== Arlington Convention and Visitors Bureau ===
The Arlington Convention & Visitors Bureau is the official tourism identity for the city of Arlington, Texas. The Arlington Convention & Visitors Bureau (ACVB) is tasked with pursuing conventions, meetings, tour groups, reunions, and individual leisure travelers to increase city revenues from sale and lodging taxes. The Arlington CVB also supports local stakeholders that pursue high-profile special events and sporting events to fill hotels, Arlington Convention Center, AT&T Stadium, College Park Center, Rangers Ballpark in Arlington, and other venues around the city.

== Sports ==
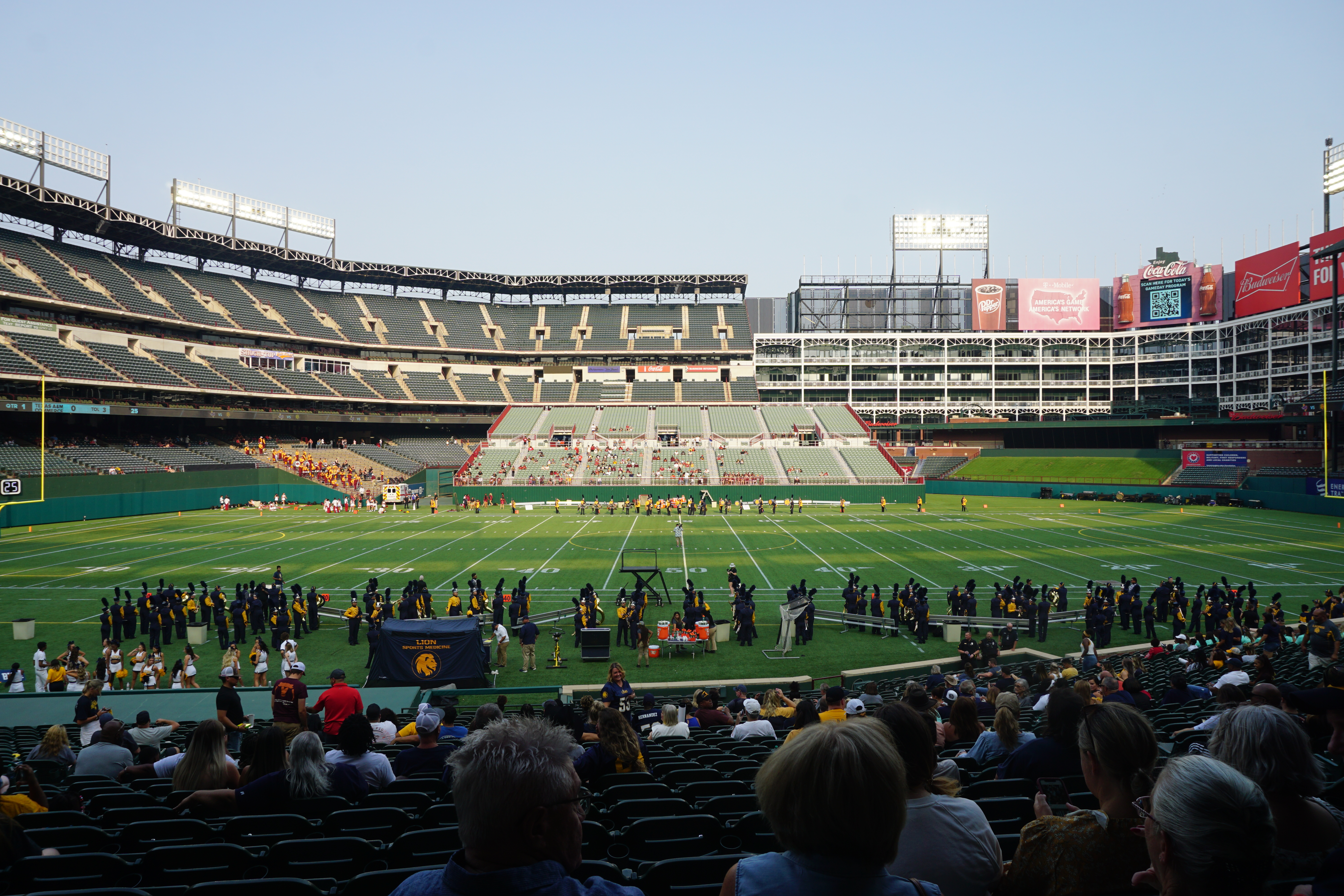
Choctaw Stadium

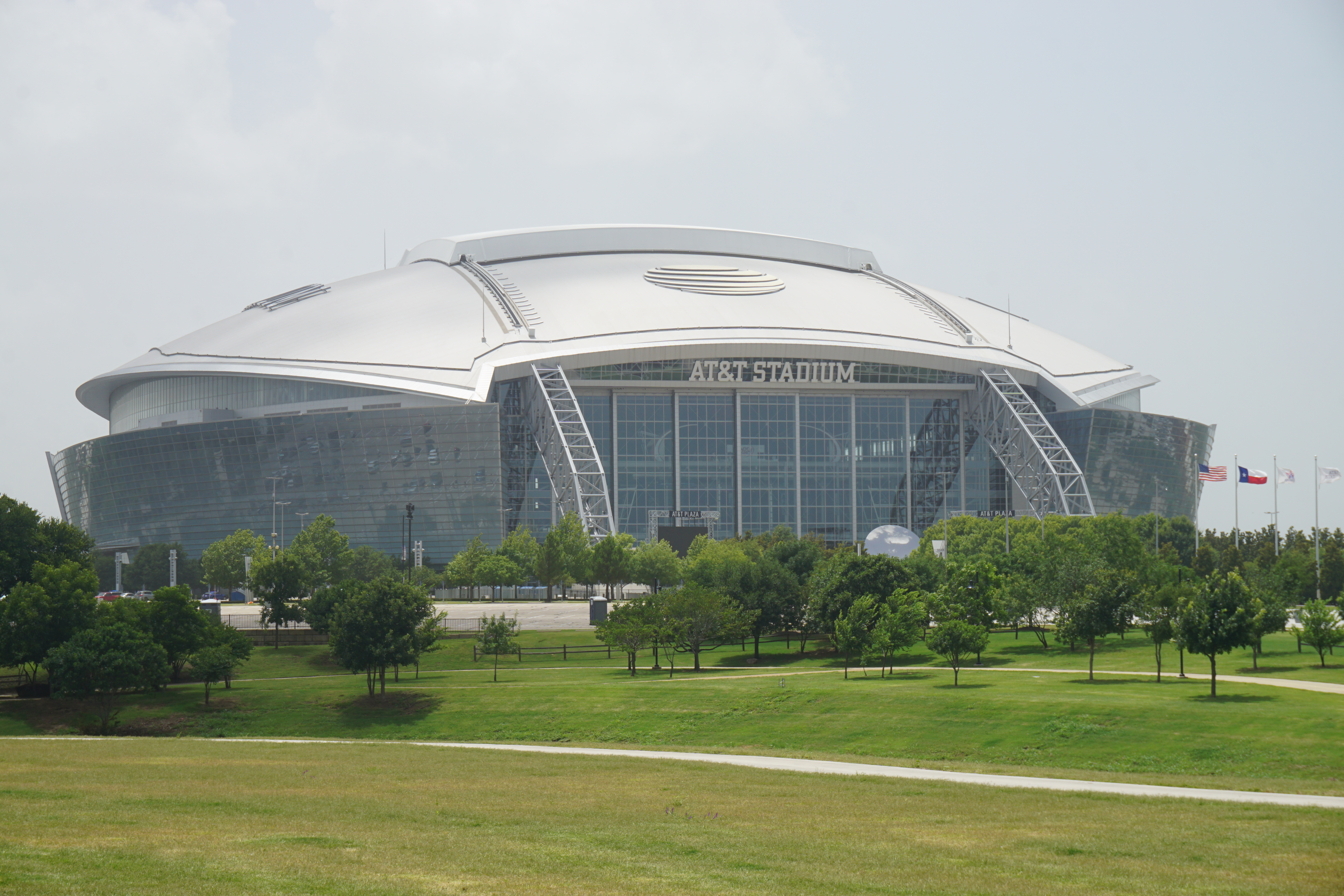
AT&T Stadium

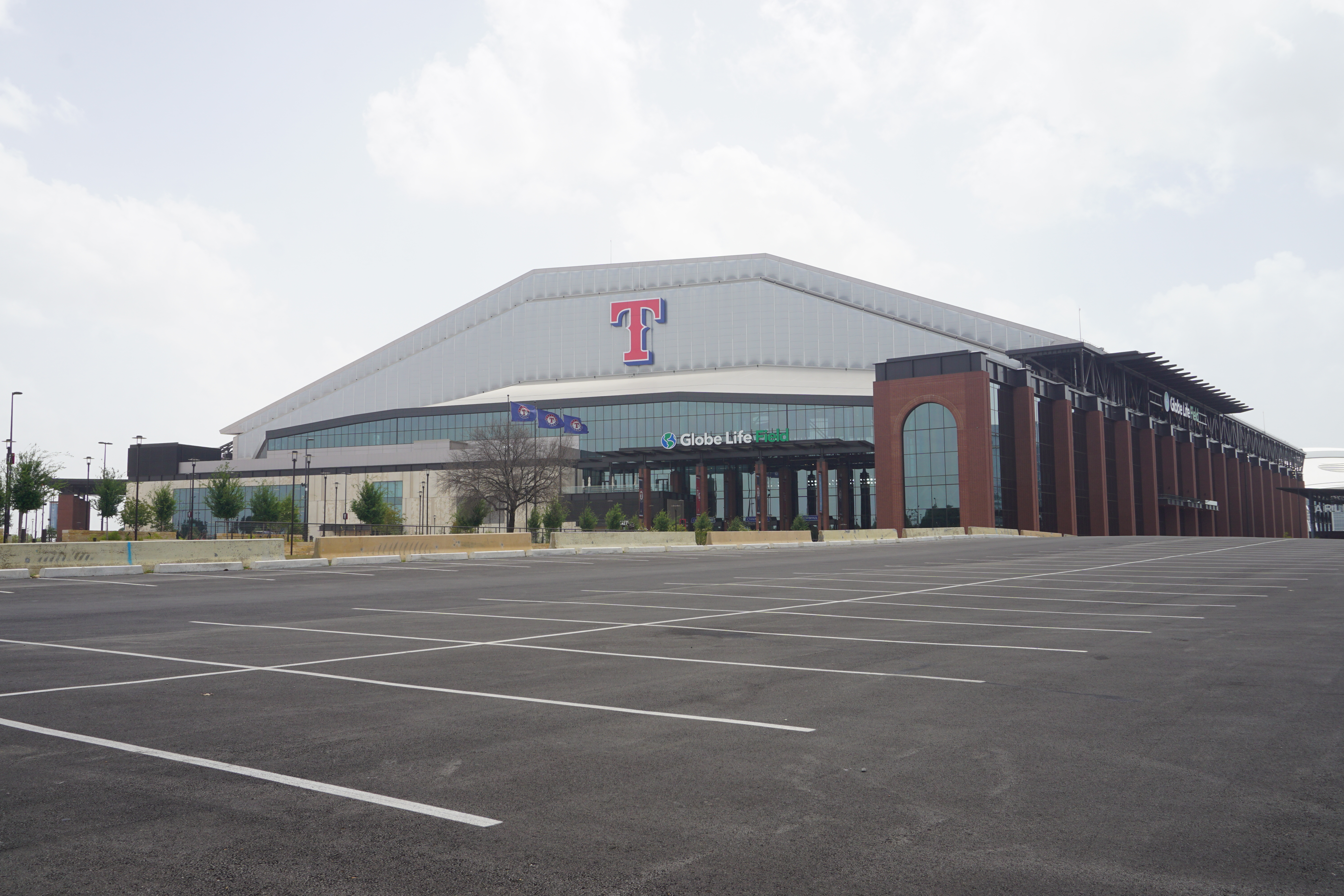
Globe Life Field

=== Professional sports ===
Arlington has long been the home of the Texas Rangers baseball team, who made Arlington Stadium their first home upon moving to Dallas/Fort Worth from Washington, D.C., in 1972. In 1994, the Rangers built a new stadium, The Ballpark in Arlington (renamed Choctaw Stadium in 2021). The Rangers made trips to the 2010 World Series, 2011 World Series, and 2023 World Series, winning in 2023 against the Arizona Diamondbacks. In 2016, residents voted to construct a new stadium and by 2017, construction began on the $1.1 billion Globe Life Field across the street from Choctaw Stadium. Globe Life Field serves as the new home of the Texas Rangers; however, the debut of the park was delayed by the postponement of the 2020 season. In 2020, due to the COVID-19 pandemic, Arlington became the first city since 1944 to hold every World Series game in a single venue at Globe Life Field. In October 2023, the Rangers defeated the Houston Astros in the American League Championship Series, and won the 2023 World Series against the Arizona Diamondbacks.

The Dallas Cowboys football team moved from Texas Stadium in Irving in 2009 to the $1.3 billion AT&T Stadium, which is within walking distance of the Rangers Ballpark. Completed in 2009, it has attracted high-profile sporting events to Arlington, including the 2010 NBA All-Star Game, Super Bowl XLV in 2011, the 2013 NCAA Division I Men's Basketball South Regional Championships, and the 2014 NCAA Division I Men's Basketball Final Four; the stadium was also the site of the first College Football Championship Game in January 2015 (covering the 2014 season). The Dallas Cowboys rent AT&T Stadium from the City of Arlington for $167,500 per month over a thirty-year period, a sum far less than market value; in exchange, the Cowboys have complete control over the facility's calendar and the revenues collected therefrom, including naming rights, billboard advertising, concession sales and most of the surrounding parking.

The Dallas Wings became the first Women's National Basketball Association (WNBA) franchise in North Texas in 2015. They were known as the Tulsa Shock while based in Tulsa, Oklahoma, but reinvented their brand after relocating to North Texas. The Wings play home games at the College Park Center in Arlington.

The Arlington Renegades is a UFL football team that played in Arlington from 2023 to 205. The team was established in 2019 and played in the renovated Choctaw Stadium. The inaugural home opener drew 17,026 fans. They moved to Toyota Stadium in Frisco in 2026.

The North Texas SC of MLS Next Pro also calls Arlington and Choctaw Stadium home since May 2020.

AT&T Stadium hosted nine matches during the 2026 FIFA World Cup, the most of any venue during the tournament.

=== College sports ===
The UT Arlington Mavericks are the athletic teams representing The University of Texas at Arlington. The Mavericks compete in the NCAA Division I Western Athletic Conference in 15 varsity sports.

UTA was a founding member of the Southland Conference in 1963 and participated in the league until the end of the 2011–12 athletic year. They joined the Western Athletic Conference for one year before moving to the Sun Belt Conference for several years then moving back to the Western Athletic Conference in July 2022.

A new arena called the College Park Center is now the host facility for basketball and volleyball home games as well as other university activities. The arena opened February 1, 2012, and seats approximately 7,000 people. Baseball home games are held at the Clay Gould Ballpark and softball home games are at the Allan Saxe Field; both facilities completed $5.5 million in upgrade cost in early 2015.

The Mavericks' team name selection was made in 1971, predating the National Basketball Association's expansion franchise Dallas Mavericks' starting choice in 1980.

Arlington Baptist College also competes in a number of sports. They are known as the Patriots and is an active member in the National Christian College Athletic Association, Southwest Region, Division II, and is a member of the Association of Christian College Athletics. The sports Arlington Baptist competes in range from: basketball (men and women's), golf (men and women's), cross country (men and women's), Track & Field (men), volleyball (women), softball (women), and baseball (men).

=== Arlington athletes ===
Arlington is the home of several notable athletes. 1998 American League Rookie of the Year Ben Grieve graduated from Martin High School in 1994. Los Angeles Angels of Anaheim outfielder Vernon Wells grew up in Arlington and attended Bowie High School, San Francisco Giants outfielder Hunter Pence attended Arlington High School and played collegiate baseball at The University of Texas at Arlington, and St. Louis Cardinals pitcher John Lackey also played for UTA. Lamar High School alumnus Jeremy Wariner won two gold medals in the 2004 Athens Olympics, and the 2005 world championship in the 400 meters in Rome.

UTA also produced Doug Russell, who won two gold medals in swimming at the Mexico City Olympics in 1968 and for whom a park on campus is named. Champion bodybuilder (Mr. Olympia 1998–2005) Ronnie Coleman resides in Arlington. Houston Comets Guard Erin Grant grew up in Arlington and attended Mansfield high school. NFL wide receiver Mark Clayton, now with the St. Louis Rams, graduated from Sam Houston High School in 2000 and was part of the University of Oklahoma's 2001 national championship team. Jared Connaughton, sprinter for the 2008 Canada Olympic team, was a sprinter for the UT Arlington team. Myles Garrett, defensive end for the Cleveland Browns and 1st overall pick in the 2017 NFL draft, graduated from Martin High School in 2014.

=== Motorsports ===
In 2026, IndyCar will contest the first ever Grand Prix of Arlington around the AT&T Stadium and Globe Life Field, in collaboration with the Dallas Cowboys and Texas Rangers.

== Government ==
=== Local ===
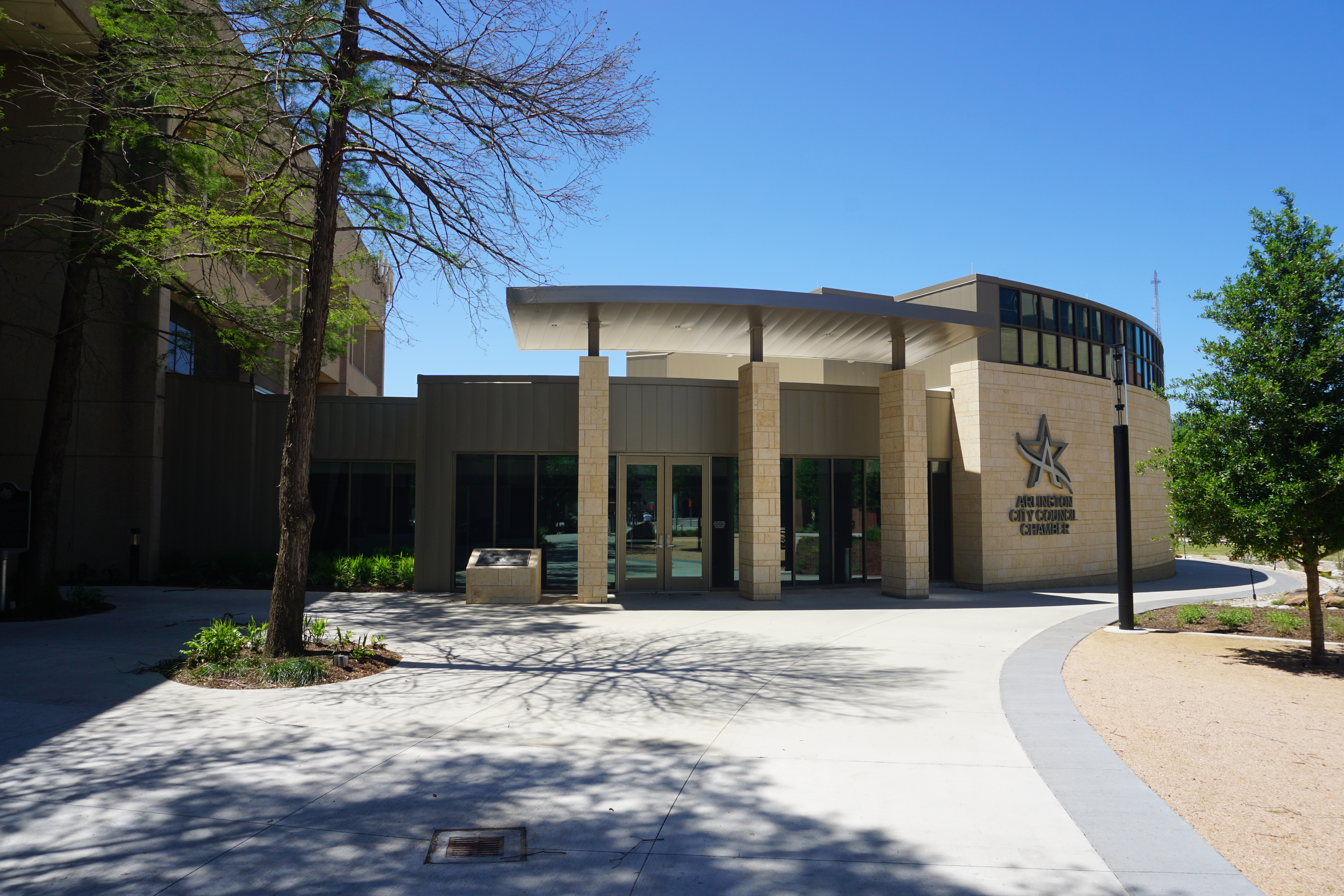
Arlington City Council Chamber

The Arlington City Council has been presided over by Mayor Jim Ross since June 2021, following the 6-year incumbency of Mayor Jeff Williams. The Arlington City Council is composed of the Mayor and eight City Council members. Elections are conducted every May with runoffs in June, with an exception for a November and December election and runoff in 2020 due to the COVID-19 pandemic. City Officials are officially elected non-partisan, although many are affiliated with political parties outside of official capacity. Prior to 2022, the Mayor/Council Members were subject to a combined maximum of three 2-year terms. In 2022, a proposition passed to increase the 2-year terms to 3-year terms.

City Council Members as of August 2024:

- District 1: Mauricio Galante; first elected May 2024; term ends May 2027
- District 2: Raul H. Gonzalez; first elected November 2020; term ends May 2027
- District 3: Nikkie Hunter; first elected June 2021; term ends May 2026
- District 4: Andrew Piel; first elected May 2019; term ends May 2026
- District 5: Rebecca Boxall; first elected May 2021; term ends May 2026
- District 6: Long Pham (at-large); first elected June 2022; term ends May 2027
- District 7: Dr. Bowie Hogg (at-large); first elected May 2022; term ends May 2027
- District 8: Dr. Barbara Odom-Wesley (at-large); first elected May 2019; term ends May 2026

According to Arlington's Comprehensive Annual Financial Report for the fiscal year ended in September 2022, the city's various funds had $731.306 million in revenues, $678.643 million in expenditures, $4.995 billion in total assets, $1.970 billion in total liabilities, and $528.568 million in cash in investments.

The Arlington Police Department had 871 employees and a budget of $118 million as of 2020.

Fire protection is provided by the Arlington Fire Department, and emergency medical services are provided by American Medical Response, which also provides medical support to AT&T Stadium.

The city of Arlington is a voluntary member of the North Central Texas Council of Governments association, the purpose of which is to coordinate individual and collective local governments and facilitate regional solutions, eliminate unnecessary duplication, and enable joint decisions.

==== List of mayors ====
List of mayors of Arlington, Texas
Name	Years served
M.J. Brinson	1881–1884
Edward Emmett Rankin	1885
M.J. Brisnon	1889–1891
Carver Dixon King	1899–1900
W.C. Weeks	1900–1902
Thomas B. Collins	1902–1904
T.G. Bailey	1904–1906
W.C. Weeks	1906–1909
James Park Fielder Sr.	1909
William Harold Davis	1909–1910
Alton C. Barnes	1910–1912
Rufus H. Greer	1912–1914
P.F. McKee	1914–1915
Rufus H. Greer	1915–1919
William H. Rose	1919–1923
William Green Hiett	1923–1925
Hugh M. Moore	1925–1926
Elmer L. Taylor	1926–1927
William Green Heitt	1927–1931
John H. Pilant	1931–1933
W.L. Barrett	1933–1935
Wylie F. Altman	1935–1947
B.C. Barnes	1947–1951
Tom Vandergriff	1951–1977
SJ Stovall	1977–1983
Harold Patterson	1983–1987
Richard Greene	1987–1997
Elzie Odom	1997–2003
Robert Cluck	2003–2015
Jeff Williams	2015–2021
Jim Ross	2021–present

=== State representation ===
Arlington is home to the following State House districts: the 92nd represented by Salman Bhojani (D), the 94th represented by Tony Tinderholt (R), the 95th represented by Nicole Collier (D), the 96th represented by David Cook (R), and the 101st represented by Chris Turner (D).

Arlington is also represented in the following State Senate districts: Kelly Hancock (R) of the 9th, Phil King (R) of the 10th, Brian Birdwell (R) of the 22nd, and Royce West (D) of the 23rd.

It is represented in the Texas State Board of Education by Brandon Hall (R) and Tiffany Clark (D) of the 11th and 13th districts.

=== Federal representation ===
Four US House of Representatives districts go through Arlington: Texas' 6th represented by Jake Ellzey (R), Texas' 25th represented by Roger Williams (R), Texas' 30th represented by Jasmine Crockett (D), and Texas' 33rd represented by Marc Veasey (D).

The U.S. Fish and Wildlife Service maintains the Arlington Ecological Services Field Office (ARLES) on Northeast Green Oaks Boulevard in far northeastern Arlington. While it is one of the oldest Ecological Services Field Stations in the United States, today its activities are focused primarily on the illegal trafficking of exotic species through Dallas/Fort-Worth International Airport. The office is not staffed or funded for nor active on the protection and enhancement of local urban-area endangered species habitat, nor on the enforcement of the related provisions of the Endangered Species Act.

The United States Postal Service (USPS) operates the Arlington Main Post Office. Other post offices operated by the USPS include Bardin Road, East Arlington, Great Southwest, Oakwood, Pantego, and Watson Community.

The National Transportation Safety Board operates the Arlington Aviation field office in Arlington.

== Education ==
=== Colleges and universities ===
Arlington is home to several public and private colleges and universities.

==== Public institutions ====
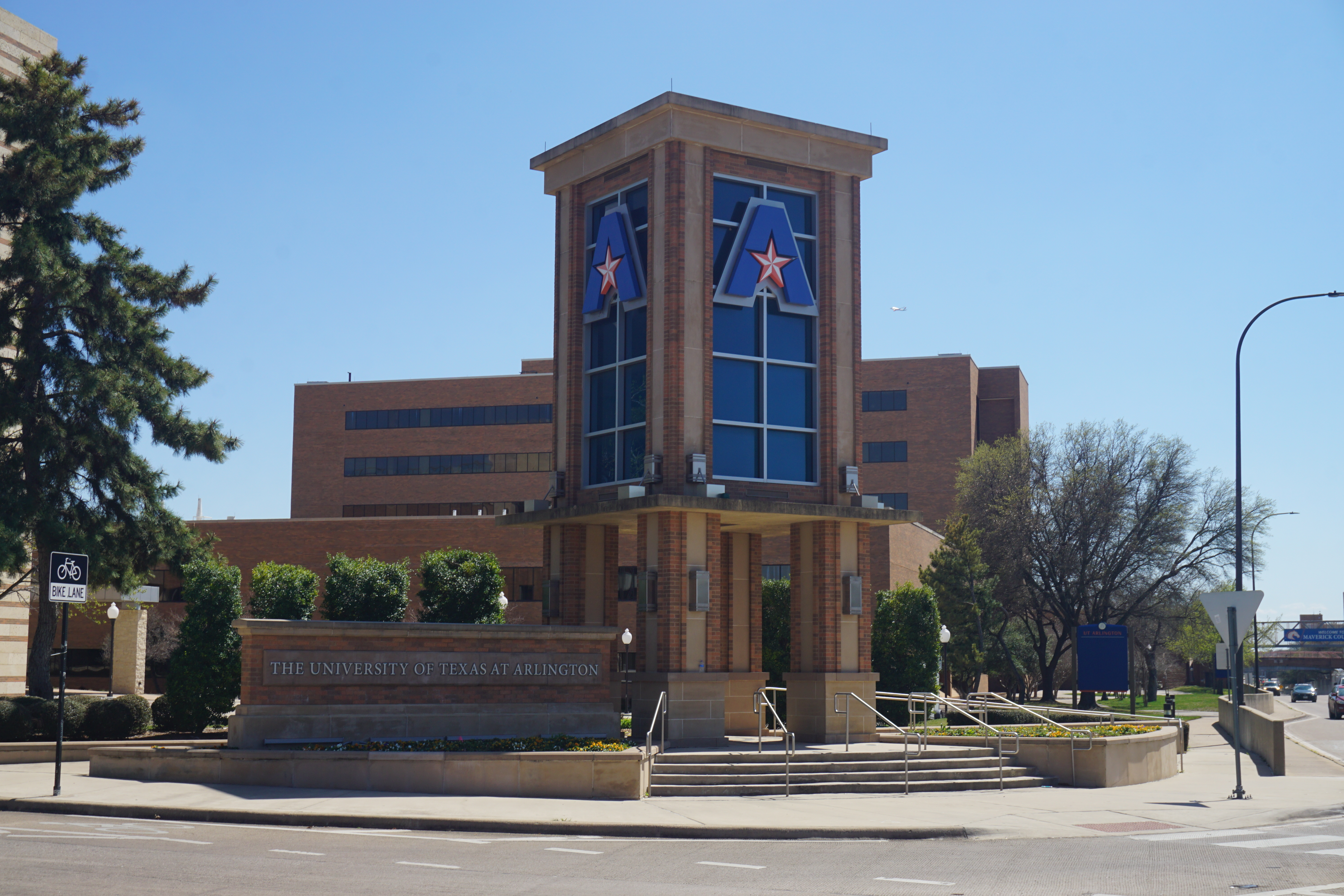
The University of Texas at Arlington

The University of Texas at Arlington (UTA or UT Arlington) is one of the largest universities in Texas. The university has over 40,000 students and is a valuable asset to the city of Arlington and its economy. Buildings within the academic core of the UT Arlington campus are among the oldest structures in the Dallas/Fort Worth Metroplex, including Preston Hall, Ransom Hall, College Hall, and the original Arlington High School.

The Southeast Campus of Tarrant County College is located in Arlington.

==== Private institutions ====
Arlington Baptist University (ABU) is a private 4-year Bible college affiliated with the World Baptist Fellowship that offers undergraduate and graduate degrees. ABU traces its founding to J. Frank Norris, the controversial Independent Baptist minister.

A branch of University of Phoenix is located in Arlington, as well as the flagship campus of Ogle School, a cosmetology school.

=== Primary and secondary schools ===
Arlington's residents live in five independent school districts (ISDs): Arlington ISD, Mansfield ISD, Hurst-Euless-Bedford ISD, Kennedale ISD, and Fort Worth ISD. In Texas, school district boundaries do not always follow city and county boundaries because all aspects of school district government apparatus, including district boundaries, are separated from city and county governments. Not all city of Arlington residents is in the AISD, and not all AISD students are residents of Arlington.

There are currently ten AISD high schools.

Arlington has dozens of private schools, including Merryhill Preschool, Elementary & Middle School. The city also has public charter schools not affiliated with any ISDs.

== Transportation ==
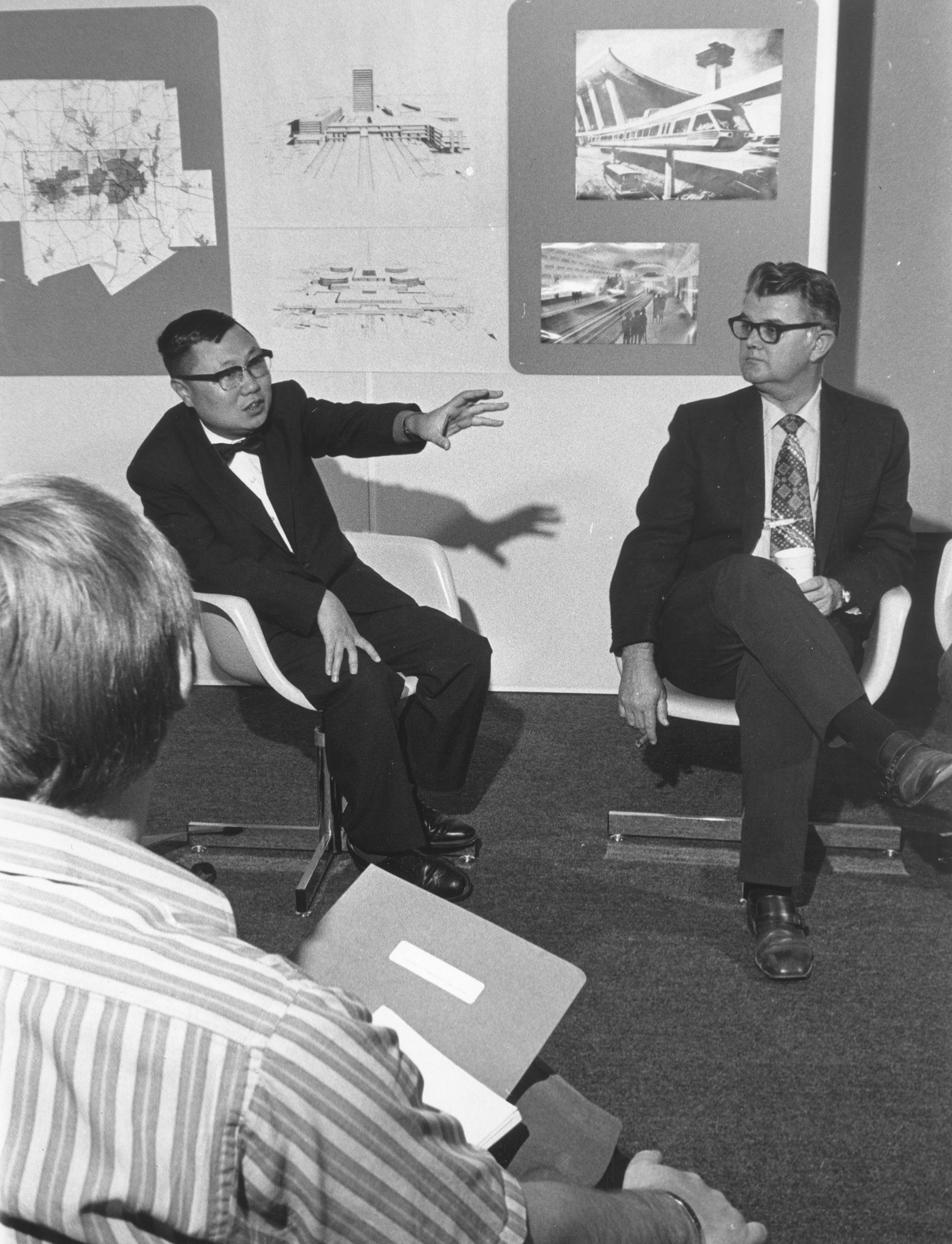
Meeting regarding proposed mass transit for Arlington including discussion of a monorail, circa 1972

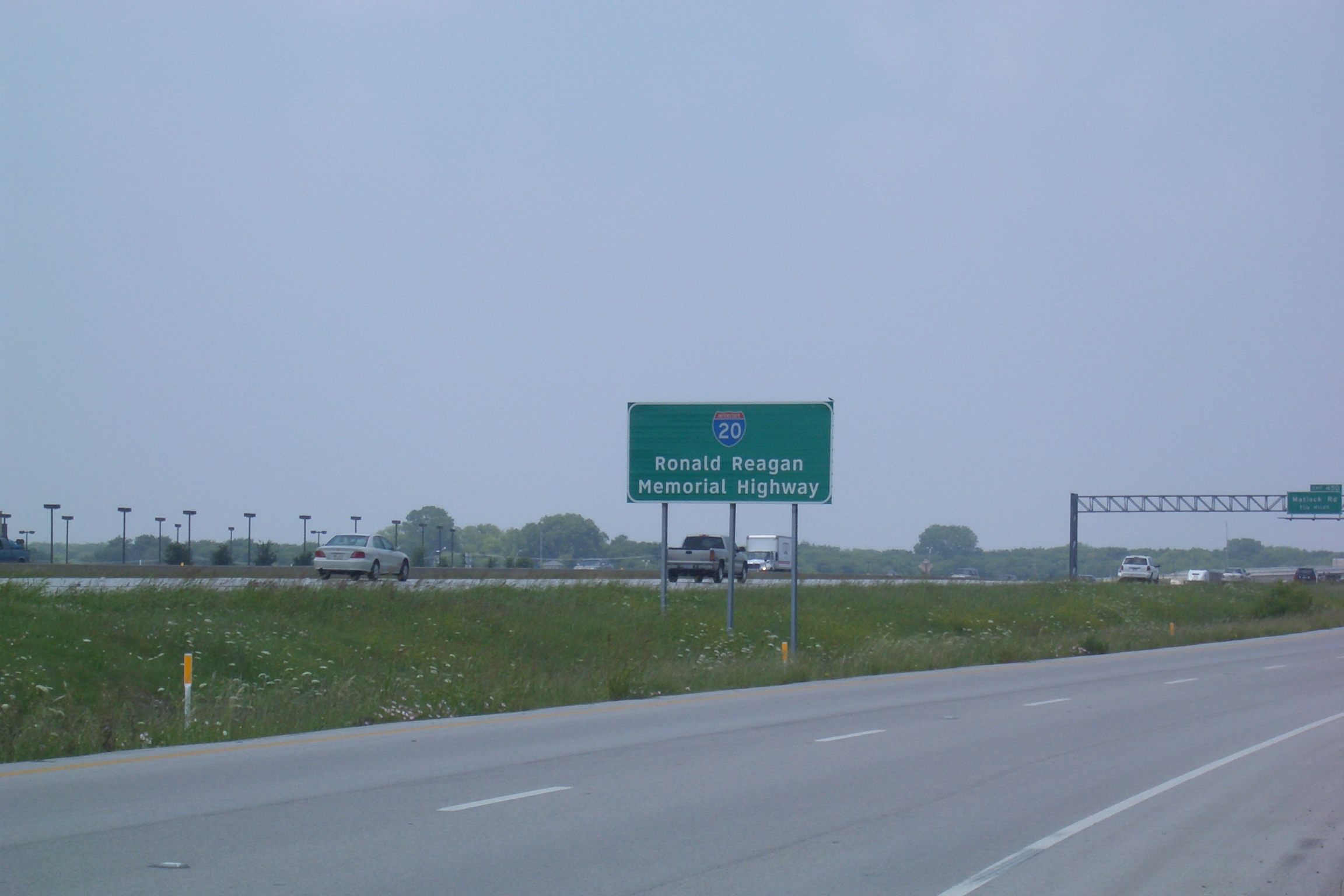
On February 16, 2006, I-20 in Arlington was dedicated as 'Ronald Reagan Memorial Highway' (signs are visible at mile markers 447 and 452).

On July 2, 1902, the first Dallas/Fort-Worth "Interurban" electric trolley came to Arlington; this popular service ran between those three cities and points in between until Christmas Eve, 1934, providing easy transportation for both business and pleasure. The track ran through Arlington along what is now Abram Street.

In the era of private operation of passenger trains prior to the Amtrak era, Texas and Pacific Railway trains such as the Texas Eagle and the Louisiana Eagle made stops in Arlington, on trips between Fort Worth and Dallas. Amtrak's Texas Eagle (Chicago-San Antonio) makes stops at Fort Worth Central Station 14 miles to the west and Dallas Union Station 18 miles to the east.

Arlington Municipal Airport (GKY) is located entirely within Arlington and is a public use airport owned by the City of Arlington. It serves as a reliever airport for Dallas/Fort Worth International Airport and Dallas Love Field. Several companies operate aircraft services on the airport property, including the Bell Helicopter division of Textron.

For many years, Arlington had the distinction of being the largest city in the United States that was not served by a public transportation system. Between 1980 and 2013, voters rejected three separate ballot proposals to bring public transportation to the city, though certain political and economic realities particular to North Texas made successful passage of those measures arguably more difficult in Arlington than in other parts of the state or country. On August 19, 2013, the two-year pilot project known as the Metro Arlington Xpress (MAX) bus began offering weekday bus service between College Park Center (on the campus of The University of Texas at Arlington) and the Trinity Railway Express (TRE) CentrePort Station near DFW Airport, with a single stop near the Arlington Entertainment District. From the TRE station, riders could take the TRE to Fort Worth, Dallas and points in between, all of which are served by comprehensive public transit systems.

On its first year, the MAX program logged 64,600 one-way rides and cost $1.4 million. The service was run through a tri-party agreement between the City of Arlington, the Fort Worth Transportation Authority and the Dallas Area Rapid Transit. City Council extended the MAX bus service beyond the original two-year pilot timeframe through annual contracts until December 31, 2017. The MAX was officially shut down on December 29, 2017, a few weeks after Via debuted in Arlington. The City of Arlington has a lower than average percentage of households without a car. In 2015, just 4.7 percent of Arlington households lacked a car, which dropped to 3.7 percent in 2016. The national average is 8.7 percent in 2016. Arlington averaged 1.89 cars per household in 2016, compared to a national average of 1.8.

In January 2017, Arlington was part of a Texas state-wide designation as an Automated Vehicle Proving Ground by the U.S. Department of Transportation. In August 2017, Arlington launched the first autonomous vehicle shuttle service in the United States offered by a municipal government to the general public on a continuous basis. Named Milo, the autonomous electric shuttles provide service during major events at Globe Life Park and AT&T Stadium, connecting remote parking areas to the stadiums.

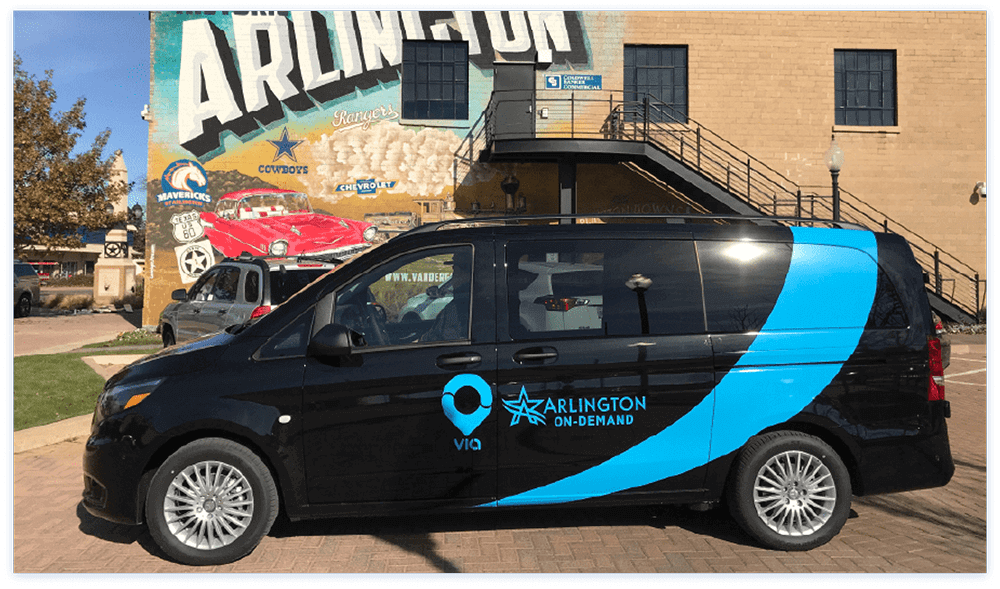
Via Arlington, the city's public on-demand transportation service

Arlington also offers Via Arlington, a public, on-demand, shared transportation service in partnership with the TransitTech company Via, which began in December 2017. Riders can request a pickup from a six-passenger van within a designated service area, which covers key destinations within Arlington as well as connecting to the Trinity Railway Express CentrePort Station. Beginning January 19, 2021, this service was expanded citywide. Arlington also partners with Via and autonomous vehicles provider May Mobility to operate Arlington RAPID, which provides on-demand autonomous vehicle rides in Downtown Arlington and on the University of Texas at Arlington's campus and is one of the first services of its kind in the United States.

Additionally, Arlington has four transit services targeting individual demographic groups: "Handitran" serves senior citizens and disabled people; Arlington hotels pay for a tourist-oriented shuttle-bus system for their guests; The University of Texas at Arlington runs a limited shuttle service for college students; and lastly Mission Arlington, an Arlington-run charity serving the severely indigent, has a bus service that circulates people needing social services or transportation to employment.

The city is served by two Interstate Highways, I-20, also known as Ronald Reagan Memorial Highway, and I-30, also named Tom Landry Memorial Highway. Other limited-access freeways include State Highway 360, which is named for the founder of Six Flags Over Texas, Angus G. Wynne, running along the eastern border, and U.S. Highway 287, which traverses the southwestern portion of the city. In most cases, the memorial names are not used in reference to these roadways. The city also has a tollway, The 360 Tollway, which connects Mansfield to Arlington and Grand Prairie. The tollway is also known as the Rosa Parks Memorial Parkway, named after the civil rights activist. Near US-287, where the tollway ends, the tollway is also named "Senator Chris Harris Memorial Highway" after the local legislator who aided the extension.

The Union Pacific Railroad now owns and operates the original Texas and Pacific (later Missouri Pacific) transcontinental right-of-way and rail route through Arlington (parallel to which the Interurban originally ran); it offers no passenger stops in Arlington, its Arlington freight service is primarily to the local General Motors assembly plant, and most of its lengthy and numerous freight trains are merely passing through town to and from points far away.
