= Robert Cluck =

American politician (1939–2026)

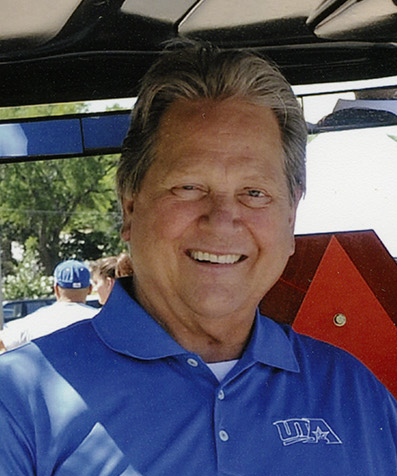

29th Mayor of Arlington, Texas
- In office May 3, 2003 – May 19, 2015
- Preceded by: Elzie Odom
- Succeeded by: Jeff Williams

Personal details
- Born: Robert Nance Cluck, Jr. March 20, 1939 Cisco, Texas, U.S.
- Died: April 14, 2026 (aged 87)
- Party: Republican
- Spouse: Linda Cluck
- Profession: Obstetrician-gynecologist

Robert Nance Cluck Jr. (March 20, 1939 – April 14, 2026) was an American obstetrician-gynecologist and politician. He was elected to the office of Mayor of the City of Arlington in May 2003 after serving two terms on the city council. He represented Council District 4. On May 9, 2015, Cluck was defeated by Jeff Williams.

Cluck was the vice president for medical affairs at Arlington Memorial Hospital, a position he has held since 2002. Prior to that, he was the medical director at Arlington Memorial Hospital and Harris Methodist Health Plan.

== Life and career ==
Cluck was born in Cisco, Texas, on March 20, 1939. His father Robert Nance Cluck Sr. was superintendent of the Cisco Independent School District for 16 years and was the first president of Cisco Junior College. Robert Cluck Jr. graduated from Southern Methodist University with a bachelor's degree in 1960 and the University of Texas Southwestern Medical Center in 1964. From 1964 to 1965, Cluck had a rotating internship at the Parkland Memorial Hospital of Dallas followed by a general practice residency at the John Peter Smith Hospital of Fort Worth. Cluck then served in the United States Air Force from 1966 to 1968 and returned to medicine with an OB-GYN residency at Parkland Hospital. From 1971 to 1994, Cluck was in private practice as an obstetrician-gynecologist in Arlington. Cluck served in the U.S. Air Force for two years, serving during the Vietnam War as a general medical officer at Clark Air Force Base in the Philippines.

He served on many boards and commissions, including the Arlington Chamber of Commerce board of directors, the Texas Municipal League board of directors, the University of Texas Metroplex Council, and the Workforce Solutions Workforce Governing Board.

Ryan Walker Grant, the owner of an Arlington strip club, was sentenced to 10 years in prison after he tried to hire people to kill Robert Cluck and Tom Brandt, an attorney.

Cluck died on April 14, 2026, at the age of 87.

== See also ==
- 2003 Arlington mayoral election
- 2005 Arlington mayoral election
- 2007 Arlington mayoral election
- 2009 Arlington mayoral election
- 2011 Arlington mayoral election
- 2013 Arlington mayoral election
- 2015 Arlington mayoral election
- List of mayors of Arlington, Texas
