= Boston College (disambiguation) =

Boston College is an American private research university in Chestnut Hill, Massachusetts.

Boston College may also refer to several other educational institutions:

- Boston College (England), a predominantly further education college in Boston, Lincolnshire, England
- Boston Architectural College, Boston, Massachusetts
- Boston Baptist College, a bible college in Milton, Massachusetts
- Boston College High School, a private Catholic preparatory school in Boston, Massachusetts

== See also ==
- Urban College of Boston, a junior college
- List of colleges and universities in metropolitan Boston
