= Stuart E. Barstad =

United States Air Force general

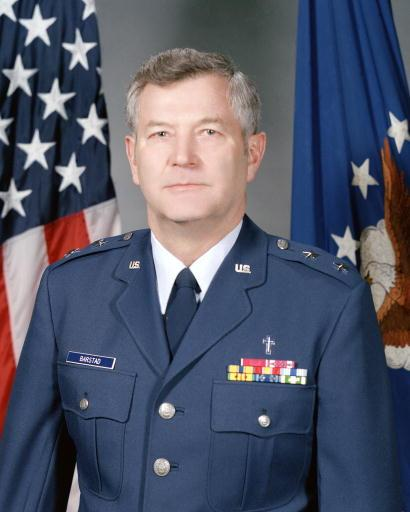
- Major General Stuart E. Barstad; 9th Chief of Chaplains of the United States Air Force
- Born: August 9, 1929; Colfax, Wisconsin, U.S.
- Died: August 25, 2009 (aged 80); Silver Spring, Maryland, U.S.
- Burial place: Arlington National Cemetery; Arlington, Virginia
- Military career
- Allegiance: United States of America
- Branch: United States Air Force
- Service years: 1955–1988
- Rank: Major general
- Conflicts: Vietnam War
- Awards: Legion of Merit; Meritorious Service Medal; Air Force Commendation Medal

Chaplain (Major General) Stuart E. Barstad, USAF (August 9, 1929 – August 25, 2009) was an American Air Force officer who served as Chief of Chaplains of the United States Air Force from 1985 to 1988.

== Biography ==
Barstad was born in Colfax, Wisconsin, in 1929. He graduated from Colfax High School and obtained a B.A. from St. Olaf College. Barstad graduated from Luther Seminary and was ordained in 1955. Later he received honorary doctorates from Susquehanna University and Norwich University. Barstad was married to Ruth Marie Noer and had two children. He died on August 25, 2009, and is buried at Arlington National Cemetery.

== Military career ==
Barstad joined the Air Force in 1955. His assignments included being stationed at Dover Air Force Base, Vandenberg Air Force Base, Ramstein Air Base, Randolph Air Force Base, The Pentagon, and Peterson Air Force Base. In 1982 he was named Deputy Chief of Chaplains of the Air Force in 1982 before being named Chief of Chaplains in 1985. His retirement was effective as of November 1, 1988.

Awards he received include the Legion of Merit, the Meritorious Service Medal with three oak leaf clusters, and the Air Force Commendation Medal.

== See also ==
- Chief of Chaplains of the United States Air Force

Military offices
Preceded by John A. Collins	Chief of Chaplains of the United States Air Force; 1985–1988	Succeeded by John P. McDonough
