= Arlington Baptist University =

University in Arlington, Texas

Coordinates: 32.739°N 97.157°W

- Former names: Fundamental Baptist Bible Institute, Bible Baptist Seminary, Arlington Baptist College
- Motto: Preparing Worldchangers
- Type: Private Bible college
- Established: 1939
- President: Clifton McDaniel
- Students: 220
- Location: Arlington, Texas, United States
- Colors: Navy, Red, & White
- Sporting affiliations: NCCAA
- Mascot: Patriots
- Website: abu.edu

Arlington Baptist University is a private Bible college in Arlington, Texas. It offers both undergraduate and graduate degree programs (only at the masters' level; ABU does not offer doctoral programs).

== History ==
The college was founded by J. Frank Norris in 1939 as Fundamental Baptist Bible Institute. The university started with 16 students and held classes at the First Baptist Church of Fort Worth. The college's first graduates became pastors or missionaries through the World Fundamental Baptist Fellowship (as the World Baptist Fellowship was then known).

In 1945, the university was renamed the Bible Baptist Seminary. Norris stepped down as the college's president, and George Beauchamp Vick became the new president. Shortly thereafter, Norris worried that Vick had been given too much power, so Norris regained control over the school and removed Vick as president. Vick's removal angered many pastors, who had reportedly grown tired of Norris' ways and who began to pull away from him, the college, and the World Baptist Fellowship. By 1950, these pastors had established the Baptist Bible Fellowship International and Baptist Bible College in Springfield, Missouri, with George Vick as president.

After Norris died in 1952, the college no longer met at his church, so moved to temporary facilities in downtown Fort Worth.

Earl K. Oldham became the college's president in 1953. During Oldham's tenure, the college's name was changed to Arlington Baptist College, and it was moved to its present location in 1955.

In 1980, Wayne Martin was appointed president, who led the college to full accreditation. Martin was succeeded in 1992 by Wendell Hiers as interim president until the appointment of David Bryant in 1993. D.L. Moody (no relation to the evangelist of the same name) served as president from 2009 to 2019. Appointed in 2020, Clifton McDaniel currently serves as the president of the school.

In 2015, the college applied for an exception to Title IX, allowing it to discriminate against LGBT students for religious reasons. Notwithstanding the request, the ABU Student Handbook (pp. 38-39) affirms the university's position that sexual activity is limited to heterosexual marriage only, and "[s]tudents participating in sexual misconduct [which it defines as all behavior outside of heterosexual marriage] will be subject to dismissal".

On June 1, 2017, the institution's name changed from Arlington Baptist College to Arlington Baptist University. In conjunction with the name change, the bachelor's and master's programs were divided into schools rather than divisions.

== Accreditation ==
The university has been accredited by the Association for Biblical Higher Education since 1981. The college is also approved by the Texas State Board for Educator Certification and by the Texas Veterans Commission as an approved institution to receive veteran's educational benefits.

== Athletics ==
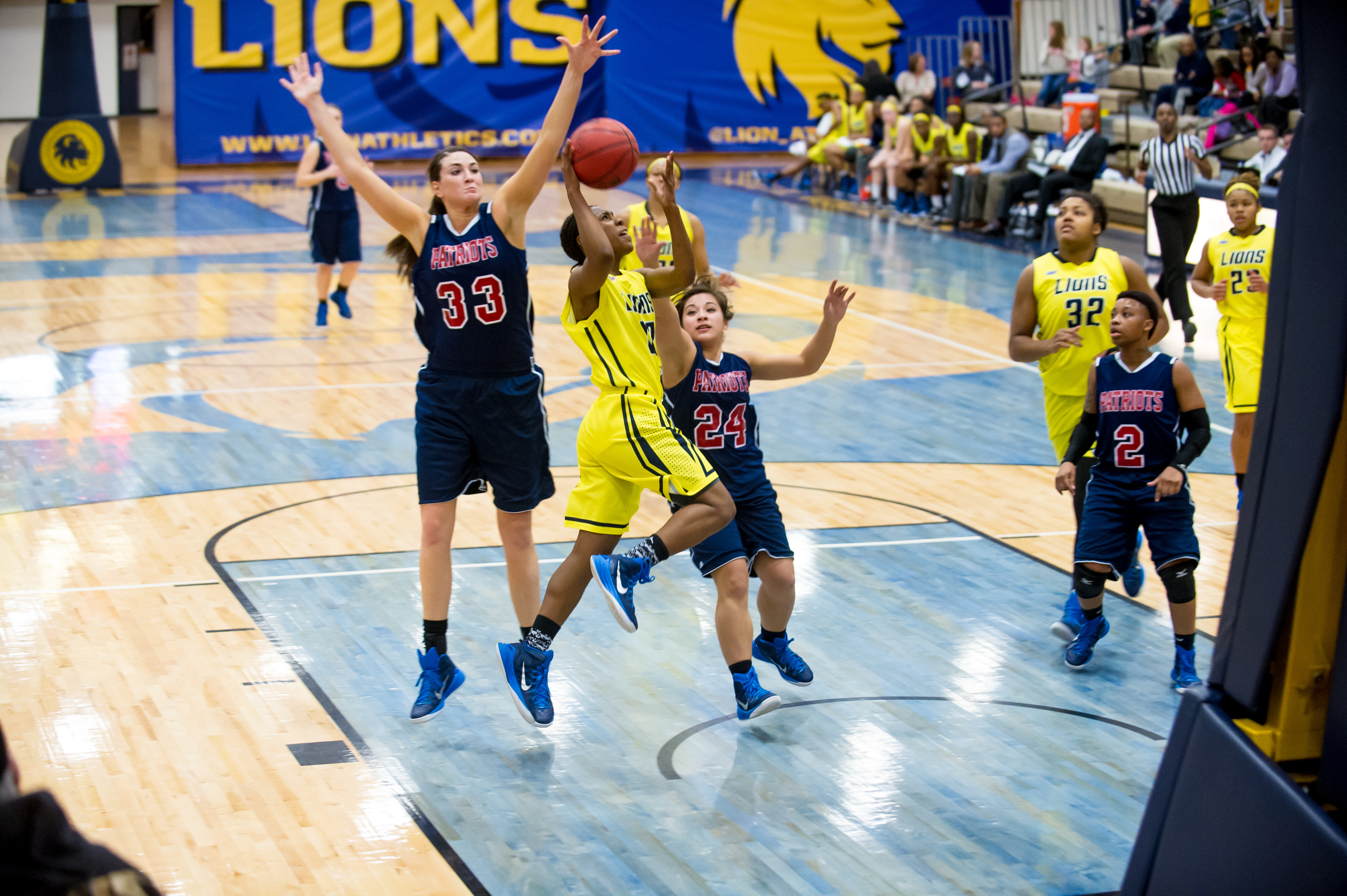
The Arlington Baptist women's basketball team in action against the Texas A&M–Commerce Lions in 2015

The university participates as a member of the National Christian College Athletic Association, Southwest Region, Division II, and is a member of the Association of Christian College Athletics. The college fields intercollegiate teams, known as the Patriots, in baseball (men's), basketball (men's and women's), volleyball (women's), soccer (men's and women's), golf (men's and women's), and softball (women's).

== Campus ==
An 8-foot bronze sculpture of J. Frank Norris (sculpted by Pompeo Coppini), founder of both the university and the Fellowship, is displayed on the campus.

The campus is the site of the former Top O' Hill Terrace casino, which has been recognized with a Texas state historical marker. Historic features from the casino still present on the campus include a sandstone guardhouse, an iron gate, an open-air tea garden, and escape tunnels; the public is allowed to tour the facilities by appointment during normal business hours.
