= Baptist Bible College =

Baptist Bible College is the name of two schools in the United States:

- Baptist Bible College & Seminary, Clarks Summit, Pennsylvania (the school changed its name to Summit University on April 20, 2015, and later to Clarks Summit University)
- Baptist Bible College (Springfield, Missouri; the school changed its name to Mission University on January 25, 2024; a branch campus once existed in Massachusetts, now called Boston Baptist College)

Baptist Bible College may also refer to:

- Heartland Baptist Bible College, Oklahoma City, Oklahoma
- Pillsbury Baptist Bible College, Owatonna, Minnesota
