= Independent Baptist Fellowship International =

The Independent Baptist Fellowship International (IBFI) is an Independent Baptist fellowship.

== History ==
The founding of the IBFI resulted from a controversy involving Arlington Baptist College of Arlington, Texas, an affiliate of the World Baptist Fellowship (WBF) after Raymond W. Barber, then President of the WBF, lost a lawsuit against the college. The lawsuit was an attempt to force the Arlington Baptist College to recognize its parent/child relationship to the WBF, revert to its original name, Bible Baptist Seminary, and return to the original intent of its founders, J. Frank Norris and Louis Entzminger. He claimed that by seeking accreditation, the Arlington Baptist College was straying from its original purpose of training preachers. Barber moved forward with the lawsuit even though an investigator found that the Bible Baptist Seminary Board of Directors had created a new junior college in conjunction with the seminary, the seminary was allowed to die and the Arlington Baptist Junior College became the Arlington Baptist College.

Although it was not a major issue during the controversy, Barber charged the Arlington Baptist College with teaching the doctrines of grace, often called Calvinism, and said that some of its faculty members were "hyper" Calvinists. It was a strategy that worked, bringing together a strong following who shared his concerns. Barber's actions resulted in his becoming a catalyst that drew 271 disenchanted pastors and missionaries together to create the new organization on May 10, 1984, at Fort Worth, Texas.

IBFI was careful to incorporate all of its institutions into one unit. It created a Bible institute, Norris Bible Baptist Institute, a monthly publication, The Searchlight, and a mission agency, all of which were under one corporation and headed by a board of directors. It elected Raymond Barber, Randy Cotton, Arvie Jernigan, Bill Slayton and Jack Warren as its first board of directors. The early years were aggressive, drawing support from 327 churches for its school, publication and 21 missionary families.

After a few years of tremendous momentum, the organization began to have internal squabbles. Barber was elected to the office of the president year after year without any challenge whatsoever. Finally, someone stood up in a meeting and nominated another pastor to that office. In a ruse, fifteen minutes before his term expired, Barber resigned. Again, his strategy worked. He was reelected by a Landslide vote. But that incident proved to be a foreshadow of things to come. In "A View of the Norris Phenomenon", the author points to the common problem of egocentricity among fundamentalist leaders as the cause of IBFI's decline. In less than seven years, Barber had badgered Jack Warren, editor of The Searchlight, and Young Houston, director of missions, into resigning.

Most of the original pastors soon left IBFI for various reasons. A new group of ministers, who were mostly anti-organizational, came into the ranks. The Bible institute became a seminary, the mission agency was reduced to a clearing house and the by-laws were replaced by a document that disenfranchised the supporting churches. Financial problems began to plague the organization and enrollment in the seminary consistently lagged between 10 and 25 students. A deal was eventually made for Crown College in Knoxville, Tennessee, to take over the seminary. Critics blame the questionable funding of an expensive building on IBFI property, called the "Raymond Barber Conference Center", for the fellowship's ultimate failure.

In its prime, Arlington Baptist College had a consistently expanding enrollment that was close to 1,000 students. Twenty-five years after the split, total enrollment for both schools was under 200 students annually.
