= Kansas Christian College (Overland Park) =

Private Christian college in Kansas, United States

Coordinates: 38°59′45″N 94°39′59″W

- Motto: Training men and women for service in the Kingdom of God since 1938.
- Type: Private college
- Established: 1938
- Religious affiliation: Church of God (Holiness)
- President: Chad Pollard
- Students: 130
- Location: Overland Park, Kansas, United States
- Colors: Royal Blue & White
- Nickname: Falcons
- Sporting affiliations: NCCAA, ACCA

Kansas Christian College is a private Christian college in Overland Park, Kansas. It is affiliated with the Church of God (Holiness) and accredited by the Association for Biblical Higher Education. The sports programs associated fielded by Kansas Christian College are nicknamed the Falcons, and compete in the NCCAA.

== History ==
Originally known as Kansas City Bible School, and later as Kansas City College and Bible School, the college was founded in 1938 at 29th and Askew in Kansas City, Missouri in the basement of the Church of God (Holiness). A bulletin printed in the early years of the college explained the purpose of the institution: "Its purpose is two-fold: to train for service young people who love the Lord, and to lead into the blessed experiences of salvation and sanctification, those who do not have this close walk with Him. In order to further the achievement of these ends, training is offered in the following departments: 1. Theological 2. Missionary 3. Liberal arts 4. Education 5. Business There is also a Short Course for Preachers given in the first six weeks of the Second Semester."

In 1941, school officials purchased the 12-acre campus of the Uhls Sanitarium in southern Johnson County, Kansas, and changed the school's name to Kansas City College and Bible School. In 1947, a new chapel and classroom building was built, and the school added a grade school classroom in 1959 to accommodate what is now Overland Christian Schools, and in 1965, three additional buildings were constructed: a large gymnasium, a two-story classroom building and a three-level dorm and dining area.

In 2015, the college began to offer a religion degree program online. KCCBS also voted to change its name to Kansas Christian College (KCC).

== Academics ==
Kansas Christian College has three academic divisions (Bible and Theology, General Education and Professional Studies) and offers both traditional and online education. Through these divisions six areas of study are offered. The college offers associate and bachelor's degrees as well as an artist's diploma for performers who are preparing for a professional career in music.

== Accreditation ==
Kansas Christian College is authorized by the Kansas legislature to grant degrees and is accredited by the Commission on Education of the Association for Biblical Higher Education (ABHE).

== Facilities ==
Kansas Christian College has five major buildings. The Administration Building houses administrative offices and the admission department. Shaver Hall houses a dining hall and student residences. Cowen Memorial Auditorium houses the gym, business offices, academic offices and counseling and tutoring facilities. The Palmer Education Center houses Overland Christian Schools and the Watkins Memorial Library. The college classroom building provides classroom space, a student center and faculty offices.

== Athletics ==
After over a decade of not offering any athletics, KCC launched a newly branded athletics department for the 2016-2017 athletics season. The Falcons compete in the NCCAA and ACCA and offer men’s baseball, softball, men's and women's basketball, men and women's soccer, men’s and women’s golf, women’s flag football and volleyball.
