= Jellison =

Jellison may refer to:

== People ==
- Benjamin H. Jellison (1845–1924), American soldier
- Joyce Angela Jellison (born 1969), American author

== Other uses ==
- Cape Jellison, peninsula in Maine
- Theodore Jellison House, house in Maine
