= Dallas Christian College =

Private college in Texas, U.S.

- Motto: κηρύξον τον λογον (Preach the Word)
- Type: Private college
- Established: 1950
- President: Brian D. Smith
- Administrative staff: 112 (adjunct/full time)
- Students: 336
- Location: Farmers Branch, Texas, U.S. 32.9137°N 96.8876°W
- Campus: Suburban, Just off I-635 and I-35E
- Sporting affiliations: NCCAA division II, ACCA
- Mascot: Crusaders
- Website: dallas.edu

Dallas Christian College (DCC) is a private Christian college in Farmers Branch, Texas, United States. It is affiliated with the Christian Church and accredited by the Association for Biblical Higher Education.

== Choir ==
The choir makes a biannual tour of churches across the country. In 2006 it joined the Southern Methodist University Meadows Choir to sing at the Morton H. Meyerson Symphony Center in Dallas.

== Athletics ==
DCC athletic teams are called the Crusaders. The college is a member of the National Christian Collegiate Athletic Association (NCCAA), an independent in the Southwest Region of the Division II level.

DCC offers men's and women's basketball and soccer, women's volleyball, and men's baseball. Teams compete in the NCCAA and the Association of Christian College Athletics

Other sports include cross country and golf for everyone and softball for women.
