= George Beauchamp Vick =

American pastor (1901–1975)

- Born: February 5, 1901; Russellville, Kentucky, US
- Died: September 29, 1975 (aged 74); Springfield, Missouri
- Resting place: Grand Lawn Cemetery, Detroit, Wayne County, Michigan
- Education: Male High School, Louisville, Kentucky
- Occupations: Young People's Superintendent, First Baptist Church of Fort Worth, Texas (1924–1932); General Superintendent (1935–1948), Co-Pastor (1948–1950), then Pastor (1950–1975), Temple Baptist Church of Detroit, Michigan; President, Baptist Bible College, Springfield, Missouri (1950–1975)
- Years active: 1929–1975
- Spouse: Eloise Avery Baker (m.1919 d.1969)

George Beauchamp Vick (1901–1975), known as G. B. Vick, or G. Beauchamp Vick, was pastor of Temple Baptist Church of Detroit, Michigan, from 1950 to the 1970s. J. Frank Norris, pastor of Temple Baptist from 1934 to 1950, appointed Vick in 1935 to help him manage the church, as Norris himself traveled between it and First Baptist Church in Fort Worth, Texas. In 1950, Vick had a falling out with Norris and became solitary pastor of Temple Baptist. Vick and others disillusioned with the direction Norris had taken, founded the Baptist Bible Fellowship International and Baptist Bible College in Springfield, Missouri.

Vick was a staunch segregationist, grounding his racism in the Bible. "God warned repeatedly in the Old Testament against Israel's mixture with other races and we believe that it is not only unwise but unchristian to thus cause confusion by mixture of the races," he wrote. Accordingly, Blacks were not allowed to join the church during his tenure, a whites-only policy that continued after him until 1986. Indeed, the church building on Grand River Avenue became during the mid-1950s a center of white resistance to integration of Detroit neighborhoods.

== Church history and buildings ==
Temple Baptist Church began as one congregation in 1921 with a merger between the Fourteenth Avenue Baptist Society [1892–1921] and the Grand River Avenue Baptist Church, both of Detroit, the Church was renamed and many of its former members left after the appointment of Brad Powell as Pastor in October 1990. Pastor Powell led the church from its decades of decline to become a 21st Century relevant church. The church membership voted to move from its Redford Michigan location to its current location of Plymouth Twp. Michigan March 9, 1997. In the spring of 1999 on of the associate Pastor over marketing at the time suggested to Pastor Powell the name "NorthRidge Church." After prayer and consideration by Pastor Powell and the church leadership the Church was renamed as "NorthRidge Church" the first weekend of February 2000. Pastor Powell and the church leadership took changing the name from "Temple Baptist" to its new name very seriously but experienced significant growth after the name change. A significant change was welcoming all people denouncing the racist behavior from decades ago. NorthRidge Church is one of the most culturally diverse mega churches in America now and growing mostly due to Pastor Brad Powell's leadership. title.

This church, having experienced many dramatic changes under Powell continues meeting at its large edifice in 49555 North Territorial Road, Plymouth, Michigan (a far-western suburb of Detroit, closer to Ann Arbor), where Temple had moved to due to dramatic growth preceding 1951 under both Vick and Norris which necessitated the vacation and sale (to a black congregation, King Solomon Baptist Church) of the former two meetinghouses on the corner of 6105, 14th Street in Detroit; the 5,000-seat auditorium of which, built in 1937 for Temple, is today the meeting-place of Starr of Zion Missionary Baptist Church, however King Solomon Baptist still owns both buildings, including the original church building of Fourteenth Avenue Baptist Church, built in 1917.

== Sources ==
- Brackney, William H. Historical Dictionary of the Baptists. 2nd ed. Historical Dictionaries of Religions, Philosophies, and Movements 94. Lanham: Scarecrow Press, 2009.
- Hankins, Barry. God’s Rascal: J. Frank Norris and the Beginnings of Southern Fundamentalism. Lexington: The University Press of Kentucky, 1996.
