= Randall University =

Christian liberal arts college in Moore, Oklahoma

Coordinates: 35°18′03″N 97°29′28″W

Randall University is a private Christian college in Moore, Oklahoma, United States. Founded in 1917, it offers associate, bachelor's, and master's degrees. It is one of several higher learning institutions associated with the Free Will Baptists. Randall University is also a member of the Oklahoma Independent Colleges and University. In fall 2024, it enrolled 288 undergraduate and 10 graduate students.

== Academics ==
Academic programs at Randall University are organized into four schools: Arts and Sciences, Christian Ministry, Education, and Professional and Graduate Studies. They offer ten bachelor's degree programs in more than twenty concentrations and master's degrees in Ministry and Public Administration. The School of Professional Studies offers fully online, adult degree completion options. The university is accredited by the Transnational Association of Christian Colleges and Schools (TRACS).

Randall University was granted an exception to Title IX in 2017, allowing the school to legally exclude LGBT students for religious reasons.

== Athletics ==
Randall University features six varsity sports teams that compete in the Association of Christian College Athletics (ACCA) and the National Christian College Athletic Association (NCCAA). The student-athletes are known as the Saints or the Lady Saints, for male and female competitors, respectively. The Saints and Lady Saints represent Randall in the following varsity sports:

- Men's sports: baseball, basketball, soccer
- Women's sports: basketball, soccer, volleyball

=== Baseball ===
The Randall University Saints have won five national championships since 1999 and produced four national championship runner-up appearances during the same span.

- NCCAA II National Championships
  - 1999, 2000, 2002, 2003, 2011
- National Championship runner-up
  - 2004, 2005, 2007, 2008

=== Men's basketball ===
Throughout its history, the Saints have won nine national championships and four regional championships.

- NCCAA Division II National Championship
  - 2016
  - 2017
- ACCA National Championships
  - 1989, 1990, 1991, 1992, 1999, 2000, 2007, 2011
- NCCAA Division II Regional Championships
  - 1996, 1999, 2002, 2011

=== Women's basketball ===
The Lady Saints won the ACCA national championship in the 2006, 2007, 2012, 2013, 2014 national tournaments.

=== Women's volleyball ===
The Lady Saints won the ACCA national championship in 2010 and 2016.
