= Oak Hills Christian College =

Private, nondenominational Christian college

Coordinates: 47.4255°N 94.9026°W

Oak Hills Christian College is a private, nondenominational Christian college outside of Bemidji, Minnesota. It is a division of Oak Hills Fellowship, which was founded in 1927 for the purpose of instructing youth and adults "in Bible without denominational emphasis or bias." In addition to its many evangelistic ministries, the Fellowship opened Oak Hills Christian Training School, a residential college, in 1946.

Over the years the Fellowship has changed the name of the school to Oak Hills Bible Institute (1959), Oak Hills Bible College (1985), and Oak Hills Christian College (1998).

In 2018 the college, which is Protestant and evangelical, had approximately 103 students enrolled in its bachelor of arts, associate in arts, and certificate in biblical studies programs.

== Athletics ==
OHCC sponsor athletics for women's volleyball and men’s and women’s basketball. All Wolfpack teams are a member of the National Christian College Athletic Association and Association of Christian College Athletics. Basketball teams also compete in the Northern Intercollegiate Athletic Conference.

The school has one national championship in its history, winning the ACCA Division II men's basketball championship in 2006.

On December 10, 2023, the school's men's basketball team gained national attention when they lost to North Dakota State by a score of 108 to 14, with Oak Hills scoring only 5 points in the first half.

== LGBT prohibition ==
Homosexuality is prohibited at Oak Hills Christian College. Students must swear to give up "sinful attitudes or actions" including homosexuality and immodesty, and affirm that only heterosexual marriage is permissible. Employees of the college must sign a similar pledge.

The college was granted an exception to Title IX in 2017 which allows it to legally discriminate against LGBT students for religious reasons.

== See also ==
- List of colleges and universities in Minnesota
- Higher education in Minnesota
