= Champion Christian College =

Private college in Hot Springs, Arkansas, U.S.

- Type: Private college
- Established: 2005
- Religious affiliation: Christian
- Students: 150
- Location: Hot Springs, Arkansas, United States; 34.4999°N 93.0652°W
- Nickname: Tigers
- Sporting affiliations: NAIA – Continental; NCCAA
- Website: champion.edu

Champion Christian College is a private Christian college in Hot Springs, Arkansas, United States.

== History ==
Champion Christian College was originally founded in 2005 as Champion Baptist College. After operating as a bible college for five years, the college's board of trustees changed the institution's name and instituted steps to attain accreditation from the Transnational Association of Colleges and Schools. Champion Christian College gained candidacy status in 2017 and full accreditation two years later.

== Academics ==
The college offers an Associate of Arts in Professional Studies and the Bachelor of Science in Professional Studies, certified by the Arkansas Division of Higher Education. It also offers a Bachelor of Arts in Church Ministries.

== Athletics ==
Champion Christian College's athletic program, known as the Champion Tigers, competes in the National Christian College Athletic Association (NCCAA) Division II. The college offers men's and women's basketball, men's and women's soccer, men's baseball, track & field, and cross country. The Tigers are represented by their mascot, Champ the Tiger, and emphasize academic achievement, athletic excellence, and spiritual development. Champion Christian College encourages student-athletes to compete with integrity and sportsmanship while fostering leadership, teamwork, and character development through competition.

On December 30, 2013, the Tigers lost 116–12 to Southern University. To start this game, Southern went on a 44–0 run, which is an all-division NCAA record for the most points scored by one team to start a game.

On March 13, 2021, the Lady Tigers won 87-81 versus five-time defending champion Arlington Baptist University to win the 2021 NCCAA DII National Championship in women's basketball.
