= IBFI =

IBFI may stand for:

- Independent Baptist Fellowship International
- Internationales Begegnungs- und Forschungszentrum für Informatik
