= Boston University (disambiguation) =

Boston University is a private research university in Boston, Massachusetts USA.

Boston university may refer to several other educational institutions:

- Boston College, a private research university in Chestnut Hill, Massachusetts
- Boston Graduate School of Psychoanalysis, a graduate school in Brookline, Massachusetts
- University of Massachusetts Boston, a public university in Boston, Massachusetts

== See also ==
- List of colleges and universities in metropolitan Boston
