= Dondi E. Costin =

American pastor, U.S. Air Force major general, and Liberty university president

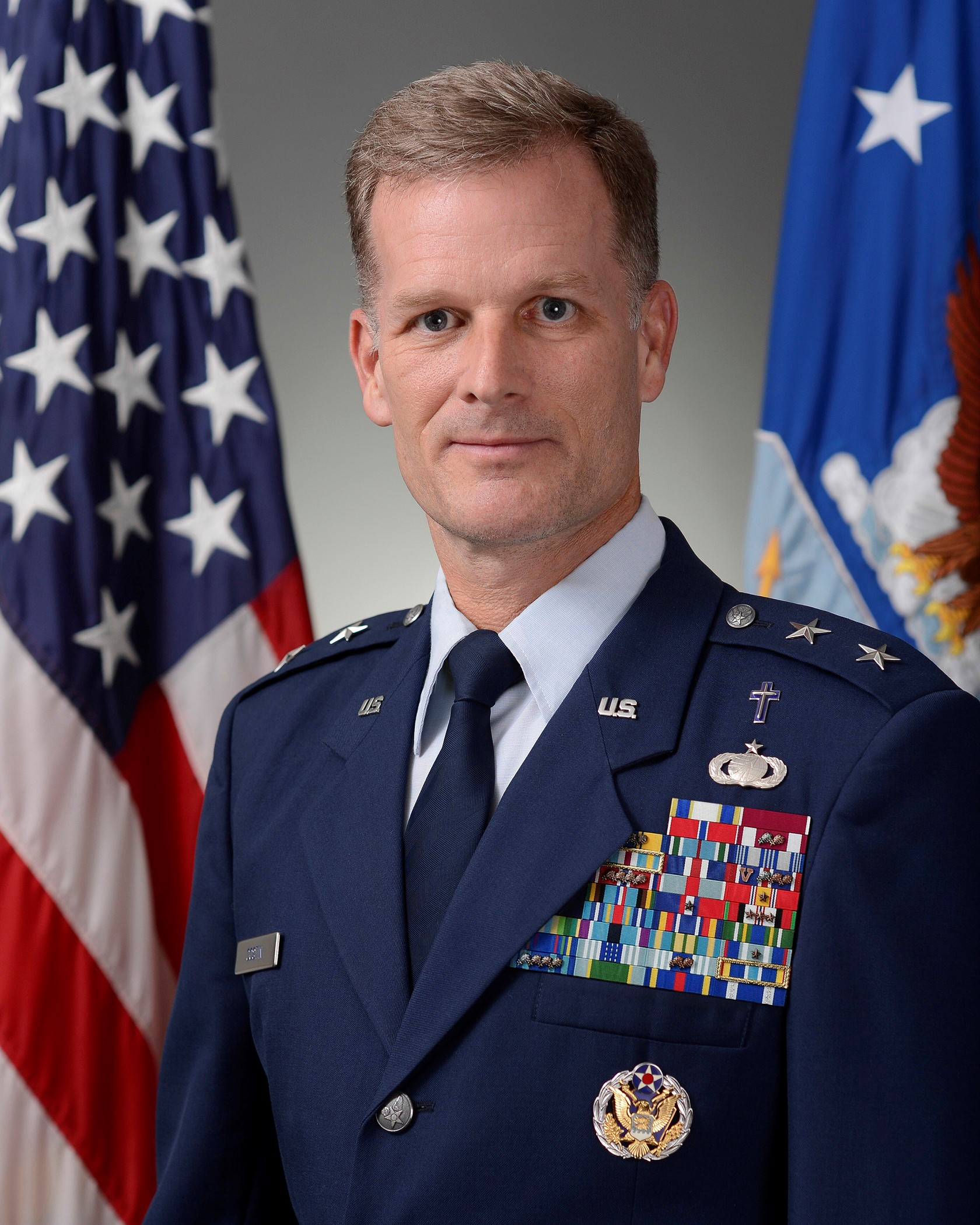
- Costin in 2018

6th President of Liberty University
- Incumbent
- Assumed office July 1, 2023
- Preceded by: Jerry Prevo

3rd President of Charleston Southern University
- In office July 1, 2018 – June 30, 2023
- Preceded by: Jairy C. Hunter
- Succeeded by: Keith Faulkner

Personal details
- Born: August 21, 1964 (age 62) Wilmington, North Carolina, U.S.
- Spouse: Vickey Northey (m. 1989)
- Education: United States Air Force Academy (BS); Liberty University (MA); Southwestern Baptist Theological Seminary (MDiv); Southern Baptist Theological Seminary (DMin, PhD)

Military service
- Branch/service: United States Air Force
- Years of service: 1986–2018
- Rank: Major general
- Commands: U.S. Air Force Chaplain Corps (Chief of Chaplains)
- Awards: Distinguished Service Medal; Legion of Merit; Bronze Star Medal; Meritorious Service Medal (7)

Dondi Enos Costin (born August 21, 1964) is an American Baptist minister and former major general in the United States Air Force. He has been serving as the 6th president of Liberty University in Lynchburg, Virginia, since July 2023.

Previously, he served as Chief of Chaplains of the United States Air Force at the United States Air Force Chaplain Corps from 2015 to 2018 and as the third president of Charleston Southern University in North Charleston, South Carolina, from September 2018 to June 2023.

== Early life and education ==
Costin was born in Wilmington, North Carolina. He attended Emsley A. Laney High School and then the United States Air Force Academy, receiving a bachelor's degree in operations research. After graduating, he was commissioned a second lieutenant in 1986.

He received his Masters of Divinity from Southwestern Baptist Theological Seminary, Fort Worth, Texas. He also holds Doctor of Ministry and Doctor of Philosophy degrees from the Southern Baptist Theological Seminary, Louisville, Kentucky, as well as a Master of Arts in Counseling from Liberty University. His military education was also at the U.S. Air Force Academic Instructor School, the Squadron Officer School, and the Air War College.

== Career ==
=== Military career ===
Costin served as a squadron-level scientific analyst evaluating air-to-ground precision guided munitions, chief of scientific analysis on a major command headquarters staff, and assistant professor of aerospace studies. He completed a competitive category transfer into the Air Force Chaplain Corps in 1996.

Costin has since served as Protestant chaplain for Air Force Basic Military Training, flight line chaplain and then senior flight line chaplain for both special operations and conventional forces in Europe, senior Protestant chaplain, readiness instructor/ evaluator preparing Chaplain Corps personnel for worldwide deployment, Air Staff branch chief, wing chaplain, command chaplain for the air component mission in Southwest Asia, and command chaplain for Pacific Air Forces. An ordained Southern Baptist minister, was double promoted from the rank of colonel to major general to assume the position of Chief of Chaplains in August 2015.

=== Civilian career ===
On April 13, 2018, Charleston Southern University in North Charleston, South Carolina, appointed Costin as the university's third president, effective July 1, 2018. He continued in that role through June 30, 2023.

In March 2023, Liberty University in Lynchburg, Virginia, named Costin as the university's 6th president, effective July 1, 2023.

== Awards and decorations ==

Badge	Air Force Christian Chaplain Badge			
Badge	Senior Acquisition and Financial Management Badge			
1st row	Air Force Distinguished Service Medal Legion of Merit Bronze Star Medal			
2nd row	Meritorious Service Medal with one silver and one bronze oak leaf clusters	Air Force Commendation Medal with three oak leaf clusters	Joint Service Achievement Medal	Air Force Achievement Medal
3rd row	Joint Meritorious Unit Award	Gallant Unit Citation	Air Force Outstanding Unit Award with Valor device, one silver and two bronze oak leaf clusters	Air Force Organizational Excellence Award with four oak leaf clusters
4th row	Air Force Recognition Ribbon	National Defense Service Medal with bronze service star	Armed Forces Expeditionary Medal	Kosovo Campaign Medal with service star
5th row	Afghanistan Campaign Medal with three service stars	Global War on Terrorism Expeditionary Medal	Global War on Terrorism Service Medal	Korea Defense Service Medal
6th row	Armed Forces Service Medal	Humanitarian Service Medal	Military Outstanding Volunteer Service Medal	Air and Space Campaign Medal with service star
7th row	Nuclear Deterrence Operations Service Medal	Air Force Overseas Service Ribbon - Short Tour	Air Force Overseas Service Ribbon - Long Tour with two oak leaf clusters	Air Force Expeditionary Service Ribbon with gold frame
8th row	Air Force Longevity Service Award Ribbon with silver and three bronze oak leaf clusters	Small Arms Expert Marksmanship Ribbon	Air Force Training Ribbon	NATO Medal for service with ISAF
Badge	Headquarters Air Force badge			

Military offices
Preceded by Howard D. Stendahl	Chief of Chaplains of the United States Air Force; 2015–2018	Succeeded by Steven A. Schaick
