= Temple Baptist Church – King Solomon Baptist Church =

Historic church in Michigan, United States

- Temple Baptist Church / King Solomon Baptist Church
- U.S. National Register of Historic Places
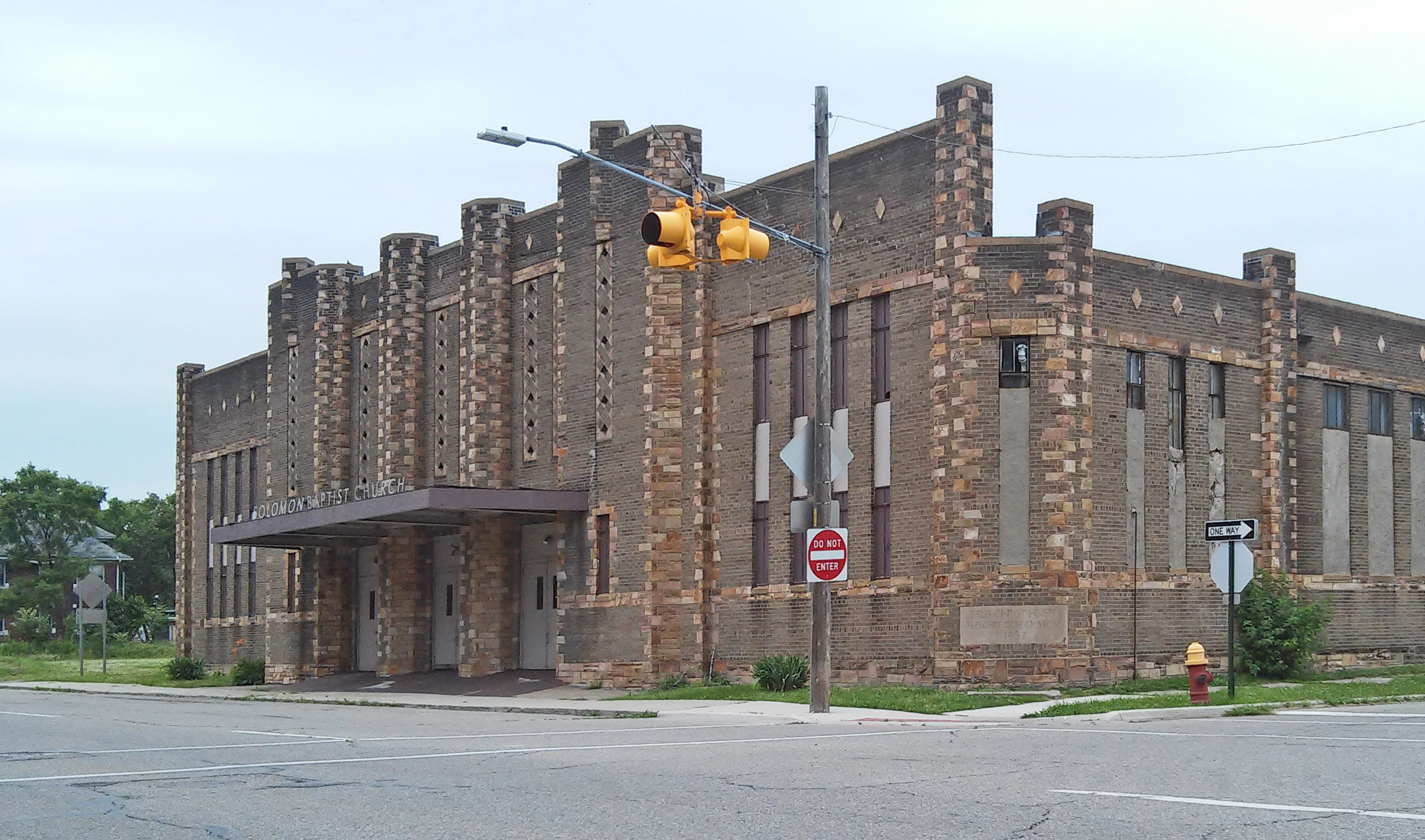
- Main Auditorium

- Location within Michigan Location within the United States
- Interactive map
- Location: Detroit, Wayne County, Michigan
- Coordinates: 42°21′35″N 83°05′33″W
- Built: 1917 / 1937
- Architect: J. Will Wilson / Unknown
- Architectural style: Tudor Revival / Art Deco
- NRHP reference No.: 15000159
- Added to NRHP: May 1, 2015

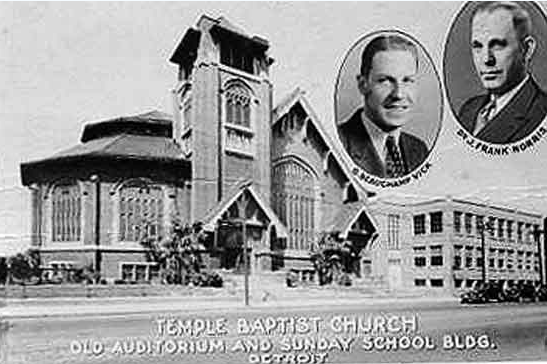

Temple Baptist Church/King Solomon Baptist Church consists of two buildings at the intersection of Fourteenth Avenue and Marquette Avenue in Detroit, Michigan. The original church, which later became known as the Educational and Recreation Building, is a Tudor Revival structure built by architect J. Will Wilson in 1917, then remodeled and made into classrooms and office space by 1940. The second building, also known as the Main Auditorium, is an Art Deco building constructed in 1937 and remains largely unchanged. The buildings are now owned by King Solomon Missionary Baptist Church.

The church was first known as the Fourteenth Avenue Baptist Church when it opened in 1917 by the Fourteenth Avenue Baptist Society, founded in 1892. In 1921 the Fourteenth Avenue Baptist Society merged with the Grand River Avenue Baptist Church; the combined church became Temple Baptist Church. The congregation consisted mostly of white southerners who had moved to Detroit seeking employment. In 1934 Temple Baptist Church invited leading fundamentalist Rev. J. Frank Norris to serve as pastor. J. Frank Norris simultaneously pastored his home church, First Baptist Church of Fort Worth Texas, flying himself between Fort Worth and Detroit. In 1950, after internal feuding, George Beauchamp Vick became pastor and remained so after the church moved to new location at 10100 Grand River Avenue. In 1968, the third Temple Baptist Church opened in Redford Township, at 23800 West Chicago (now Detroit World Outreach). After the death of G. Beauchamp Vick, Temple Baptist was pastored by A.V. Henderson and then by Truman Dollar until his death by suicide in the 1996. Brad Powell was then called in as pastor in 1990 and the church changed its name to Northridge Church after it was relocated to Plymouth Michigan.

King Solomon Baptist Church, founded in 1926, purchased the Temple Baptist Church buildings in 1951. The Main Auditorium, with a capacity of over 5,000 people, was at the time the largest African American-owned auditorium in Detroit. The church was an important location to the Civil Rights Movement, as it was an early member of the Progressive National Baptist Convention and the site of that body's second annual conference. It served as the location of Malcolm X's 1963 "Message to the Grass Roots" address, one of his most influential speeches. Numerous guests, including Martin Luther King Jr., Ralph D. Abernathy, and Benjamin Mays, also gave talks there.
