= World Baptist Fellowship =

Separatist fundamentalist Baptist organisation

The World Baptist Fellowship (WBF) is a separatist fundamentalist Independent Baptist organization. The organization was founded by J. Frank Norris (1877–1952) of Texas, a southern fundamentalist leader in the first half of the 20th century. It is headquartered in Arlington, Texas.

== History ==
J. Frank Norris became a combatant in the fundamentalist/modernist controversy. He edited a paper entitled The Fundamentalist. Both the Southern Baptist Convention and the Baptist General Convention of Texas expelled Norris because of his controversial behavior. Norris, C. P. Staley and others formed the Premillennial Missionary Baptist Fellowship in 1933 at Fort Worth, Texas. In 1938, the name was changed to World Fundamental Baptist Missionary Fellowship and then to World Baptist Fellowship (WBF) after the schism that created the Baptist Bible Fellowship International in 1950. The WBF was again divided in 1984, when a group led by Raymond W. Barber established the Independent Baptist Fellowship International and the Norris Bible Baptist Institute.

Arlington Baptist University (the Fellowship's official educational institution) was founded in 1939 as Fundamental Baptist Bible Institute.

The World Baptist Fellowship had 945 churches in 1995, with its primary strength in Texas, Florida and Ohio. More than half of these churches also participate in other independent fundamental Baptist fellowships.

== Organization ==
The WBF considers itself a missions agency. Its missionary work is headed by the Mission Committee, whose members are nominated by the existing committee and approved by the General Assembly in annual meeting. In 2003, the WBF had 85 approved missionaries. National Fellowship meetings are held twice per year.
