= Arthur S. Thomas =

United States Air Force general

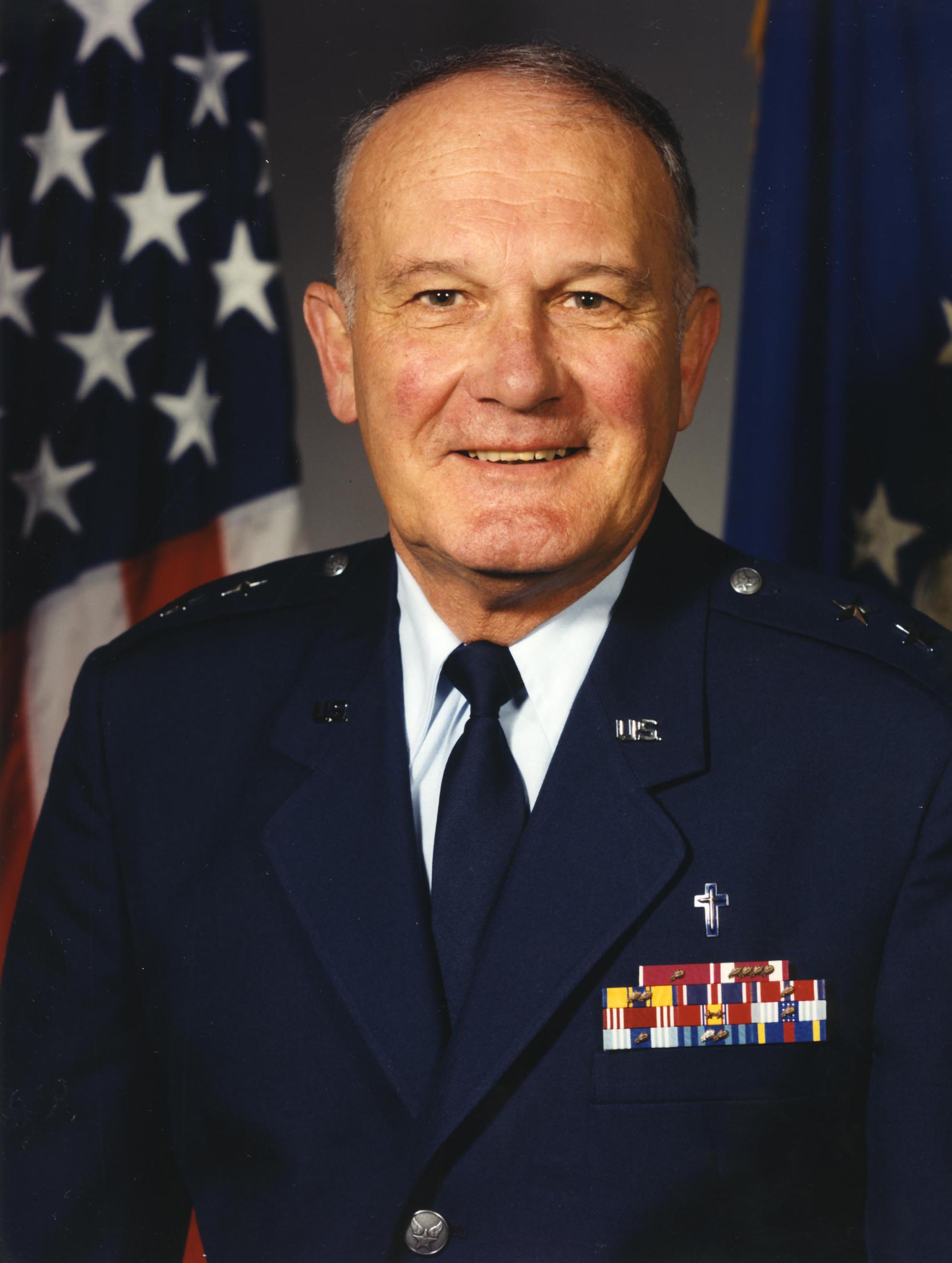
- Born: July 15, 1935; Mankato, Minnesota, US
- Died: January 19, 2001 (aged 65); Washington, D.C., US
- Burial place: Arlington National Cemetery
- Military career
- Allegiance: United States
- Branch: United States Air Force
- Service years: 1955–1997
- Rank: Major general
- Commands: Chief of Chaplains of the United States Air Force
- Awards: Legion of Merit with oak leaf cluster, Meritorious Service Medal with silver oak leaf cluster, Air Force Commendation Medal with two oak leaf clusters others below

Arthur Sam Thomas (July 15, 1935 – January 19, 2001) was a Roman Catholic priest and the Chief of Chaplains of the United States Air Force from 1995 to 1997.

== Biography ==
A native of Mankato, Minnesota, Thomas was a Roman Catholic priest. He was a graduate of Minnesota State University, Mankato and the Graduate Theological Union. In 1992, he was given the title of Monsignor by Pope John Paul II.

== Career ==
Thomas originally joined the Minnesota National Guard in 1953 before joining the United States Air Force in 1955. His early years were spent as a Russian language specialist.

In 1982, he was named Senior Catholic Chaplain of the 86th Tactical Airlift Wing. He held that position until 1984, when he was assigned to Headquarters Tactical Air Command. From there, he was Command Chaplain of Air Force Logistics Command and Strategic Air Command before becoming Deputy Chief of Chaplains of the United States Air Force in 1991. He was promoted to Chief of Chaplains with the rank of major general in 1995 and held the position until his retirement in 1997. Msgr. Thomas died suddenly of a heart attack on Friday, January 19, 2001, in Florida, aged 65. He is buried at Arlington National Cemetery in Section 2 Site E-287 RH.

== Awards and military decorations ==
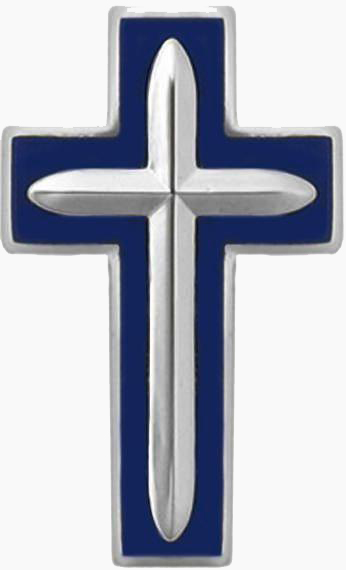

Badge	Air Force Christian Chaplain Badge		
1st Row		Air Force Distinguished Service Medal	
2nd row	Legion of Merit with one bronze oak leaf cluster	Meritorious Service Medal with four oak leaf clusters	Air Force Commendation Medal with two oak leaf clusters
3rd Row	Air Force Outstanding Unit Award	Air Force Organizational Excellence Award with oak leaf cluster	Army Good Conduct Medal
4th Row	National Defense Service Medal with two bronze service stars	Air Force Overseas Ribbon - Short with oak leaf cluster	Air Force Overseas Ribbon - Long with oak leaf cluster
5th row	Air Force Longevity Service Award Ribbon with silver and three bronze oak leaf clusters	Air Force Longevity Service Award Ribbon (second ribbon to denote tenth award)	Air Force Training Ribbon
