= Champion Baptist College =

Christian college in Arkansas, U.S.

Champion Christian College
- Type: Private college
- Established: 2005
- Religious affiliation: Gospel Light Baptist Church
- President: Eric Capaci
- Students: 250
- Location: Hot Springs, Arkansas, United States; 34.4999°N 93.0652°W
- Nickname: Tigers
- Website: champion.edu

Champion Christian College is a private Christian college in Hot Springs, Arkansas, United States. The college is associated with the Gospel Light Baptist Church.

== History ==
Champion Christian College (formerly known as Champion Baptist College) was founded in 2005.

== Academics ==
The college offers associate, bachelor's, and master's degrees.

== Athletics ==
The college's athletic program is known as the Champion Christian Tigers and fields a men's basketball team as an independent member of the Association of Christian College Athletics (ACCA). On December 30, 2013, the Tigers lost 116–12 to Southern University. To start this game, Southern went on a 44–0 run, which is an all-division NCAA record for the most points scored by one team to start a game.
