= Donald J. Harlin =

United States Air Force general

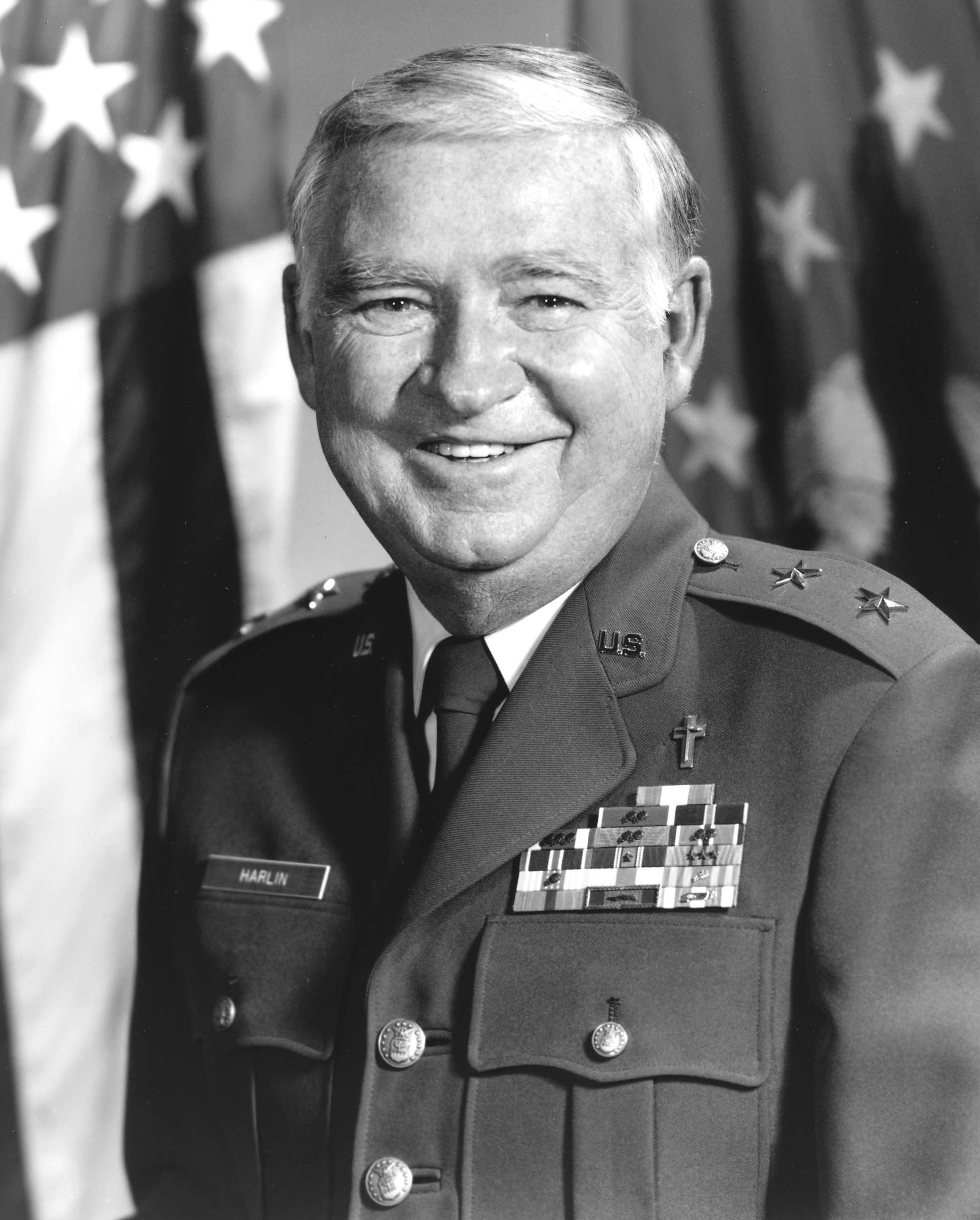
- Born: August 14, 1935; Flushing, New York, U.S.
- Died: February 9, 2015 (aged 79); LaGrange, Georgia, U.S.
- Military career
- Allegiance: United States of America
- Branch: United States Air Force
- Service years: 1965–1995
- Rank: Major general
- Commands: Chief of Chaplains of the United States Air Force
- Awards: Air Force Distinguished Service Medal, Legion of Merit with two oak leaf clusters, Bronze Star Medal, Meritorious Service Medal with three oak leaf clusters Air Force Commendation Medal with three oak leaf clusters

Donald J. Harlin (August 14, 1935 – February 9, 2015) was an American Air Force major general who served as Chief of Chaplains of the United States Air Force.

A native of Flushing, New York, where he was born in 1935, Harlin is an ordained Baptist pastor. He is a graduate of Nyack College and Gordon-Conwell Theological Seminary. He died in February 2015 in hospital at LaGrange, Georgia.

== Career ==
Harlin joined the United States Air Force in 1965 and was stationed at Minot Air Force Base. Later, he served in the Vietnam War from 1967 to 1968.

Harlin later became Command Chaplain of Air Training Command, the Air University and Tactical Air Command before being named Deputy Chief of Chaplains of the United States Air Force in 1988. He was promoted to Chief of Chaplains in 1991 and achieved the rank of major general in 1992. Harlin remained Chief of Chaplains until his retirement in 1995.

Awards he received include the Air Force Distinguished Service Medal, the Legion of Merit with two oak leaf clusters, the Bronze Star Medal, the Meritorious Service Medal with three oak leaf clusters and the Air Force Commendation Medal with three oak leaf clusters.
