= Chief of Chaplains of the United States Air Force =

Senior chaplain of the US Air Force

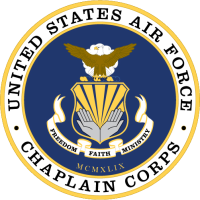

- Flag of an Air Force major general

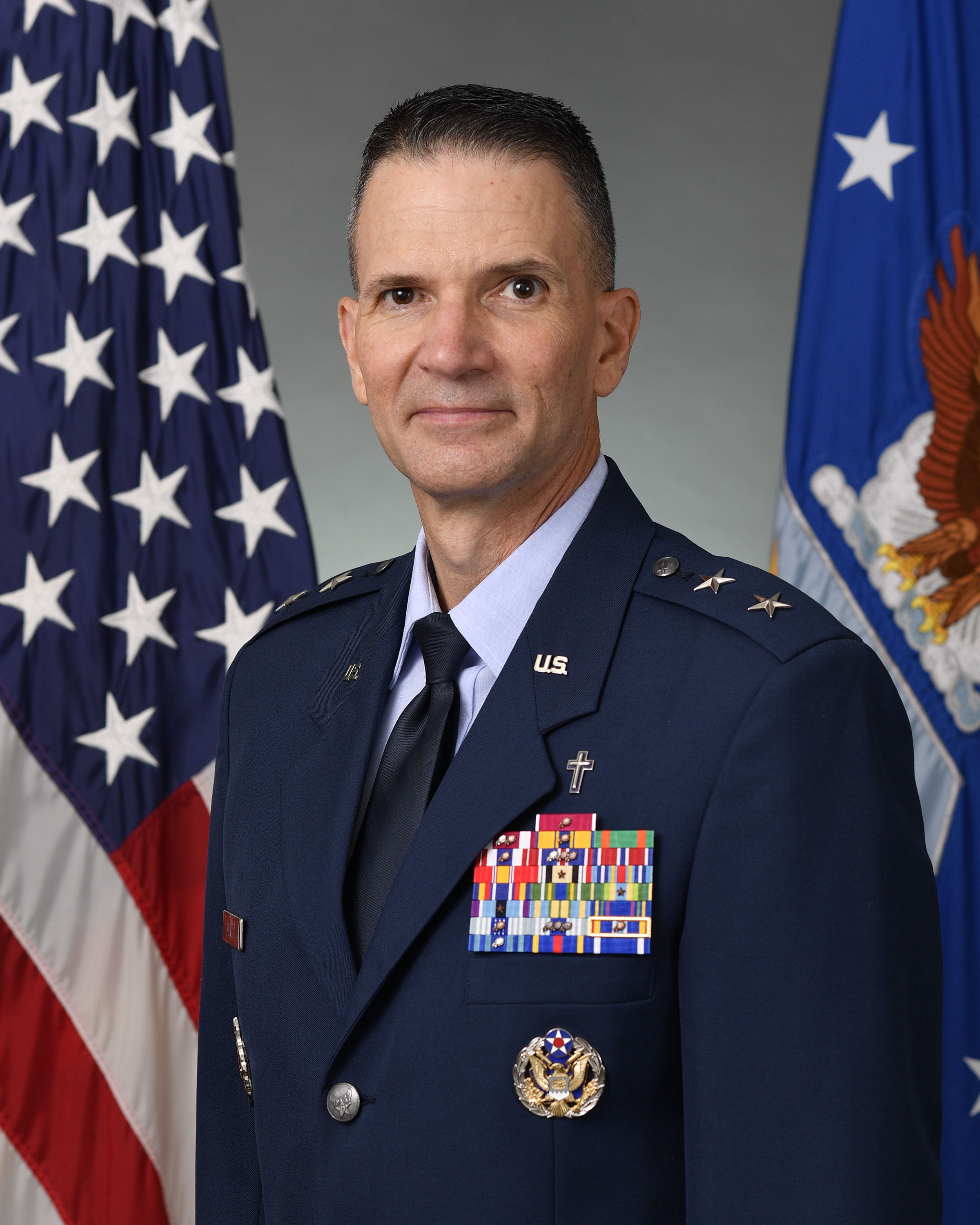
- Incumbent; Major General Trent C. Davis since 9 August 2024
- Formation: 11 June 1948
- First holder: Maj Gen Charles I. Carpenter
- Deputy: Deputy Chief of Chaplains of the United States Air Force
- Website: https://www.airforce.com/careers/specialty-careers/chaplain

The chief of chaplains of the United States Air Force (HAF/HC) is the senior chaplain in the United States Air Force, the functional leader of the United States Air Force Chaplain Corps, and the senior advisor on religious issues to the secretary and chief of staff of the U.S. Air Force. Since 2019, the Chief of Chaplains of the Air Force has also served concurrently as Chief of Chaplains of the United States Space Force.

The position has been held by Major General Trent C. Davis since 9 August 2024.

== List of chiefs of chaplains of the United States Air Force ==
No.	Portrait	Name	Took office	Left office	Term length
1		Maj Gen Charles I. Carpenter	11 June 1948	14 August 1958	10 years, 64 days
2		Maj Gen Terence P. Finnegan	15 August 1958	1 July 1962	3 years, 320 days
3		Maj Gen Robert P. Taylor	1 September 1962	31 July 1966	3 years, 333 days
4		Maj Gen Edwin R. Chess	1 August 1966	1 August 1970	4 years, 0 days
5		Maj Gen Roy M. Terry	10 August 1970	1 August 1974	3 years, 356 days
6		Maj Gen Henry J. Meade	2 August 1974	1 August 1978	3 years, 364 days
7		Maj Gen Richard Carr	1 November 1978	31 July 1982	3 years, 272 days
8		Maj Gen John A. Collins	1 August 1982	1 November 1985	3 years, 92 days
9		Maj Gen Stuart E. Barstad	2 November 1985	1 November 1988	2 years, 365 days
10		Maj Gen John P. McDonough	1 December 1988	1 December 1991	3 years, 0 days
11		Maj Gen Donald J. Harlin	2 December 1991	1 August 1995	3 years, 242 days
12		Maj Gen Arthur S. Thomas	1 August 1995	1 August 1997	2 years, 0 days
13		Maj Gen William J. Dendinger	1 June 1997	1 May 2001	3 years, 334 days
14		Maj Gen Lorraine K. Potter	24 May 2001	1 June 2004	3 years, 8 days
15		Maj Gen Charles C. Baldwin	2 June 2004	27 May 2008	3 years, 360 days
16		Maj Gen Cecil R. Richardson	28 May 2008	1 June 2012	4 years, 4 days
17		Maj Gen Howard D. Stendahl	31 August 2012	29 August 2015	2 years, 363 days
18		Maj Gen Dondi E. Costin	30 August 2015	20 August 2018	2 years, 355 days
19		Maj Gen Steven A. Schaick	21 August 2018	2 July 2021	2 years, 315 days
20		Maj Gen Randall E. Kitchens	October 2021	9 August 2024	~2 years, 299 days
21		Maj Gen Trent C. Davis	9 August 2024	present	2 years, 71 days

== See also ==
- Armed Forces Chaplains Board
- Deputy Chief of Chaplains of the United States Air Force
- Chiefs of Chaplains of the United States
- International Military Chiefs of Chaplains Conference
