= Jerry Prevo =

American academic administrator and retired Baptist minister

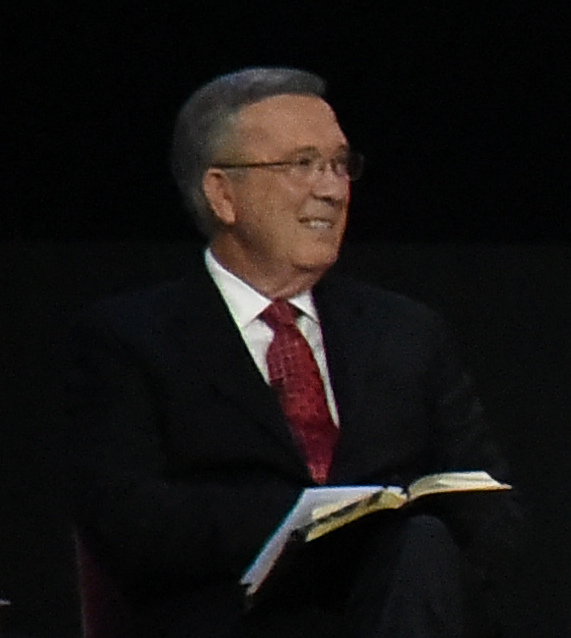
- Jerry Prevo at the memorial service for Don Young at Anchorage Baptist Temple on April 2, 2022

5th President of Liberty University
- In office August 10, 2020 – March 31, 2023
- Preceded by: Jerry Falwell Jr.
- Succeeded by: Dondi Costin

Personal details
- Born: Jerry Lee Prevo; January 12, 1945 (age 81) Oak Ridge, Tennessee, U.S.
- Spouse: Carol Sherwood
- Education: Baptist Bible College (BA); Hyles–Anderson College (DDiv)

Jerry Lee Prevo (born January 12, 1945) is a retired Baptist minister and an American academic administrator. He was the president of Liberty University from August 2020 to March 2023.

== Early life and education ==
Prevo was born on January 12, 1945, in Oak Ridge, Tennessee, to Milan and Aray Phillips Prevo. He graduated from Baptist Bible College. He did graduate work at Belmont University, Tennessee Temple University, the University of Tennessee, and Chapman College. A Doctor of Divinity degree was conferred on him by Hyles–Anderson College.

== Career ==
For 47 years, Prevo was a pastor at the Anchorage Baptist Temple in Anchorage, Alaska. In January 1980, he founded Alaska's chapter of the Moral Majority and began to boost Republican politicians. Upon his retirement from the Anchorage Baptist Temple in March 2019, the Anchorage Daily News referred to him as the city's "loudest evangelical voice."

In 2020, Prevo was serving as chairman of the board of trustees of Liberty University when controversial photos of Jerry Falwell Jr. came to light. After Falwell resigned, Prevo was selected by the university's executive committee to serve as the school's interim president.

Prevo was followed as president of Liberty University by Dondi Costin in July 2023.
