= List of colleges and universities in metropolitan Boston =

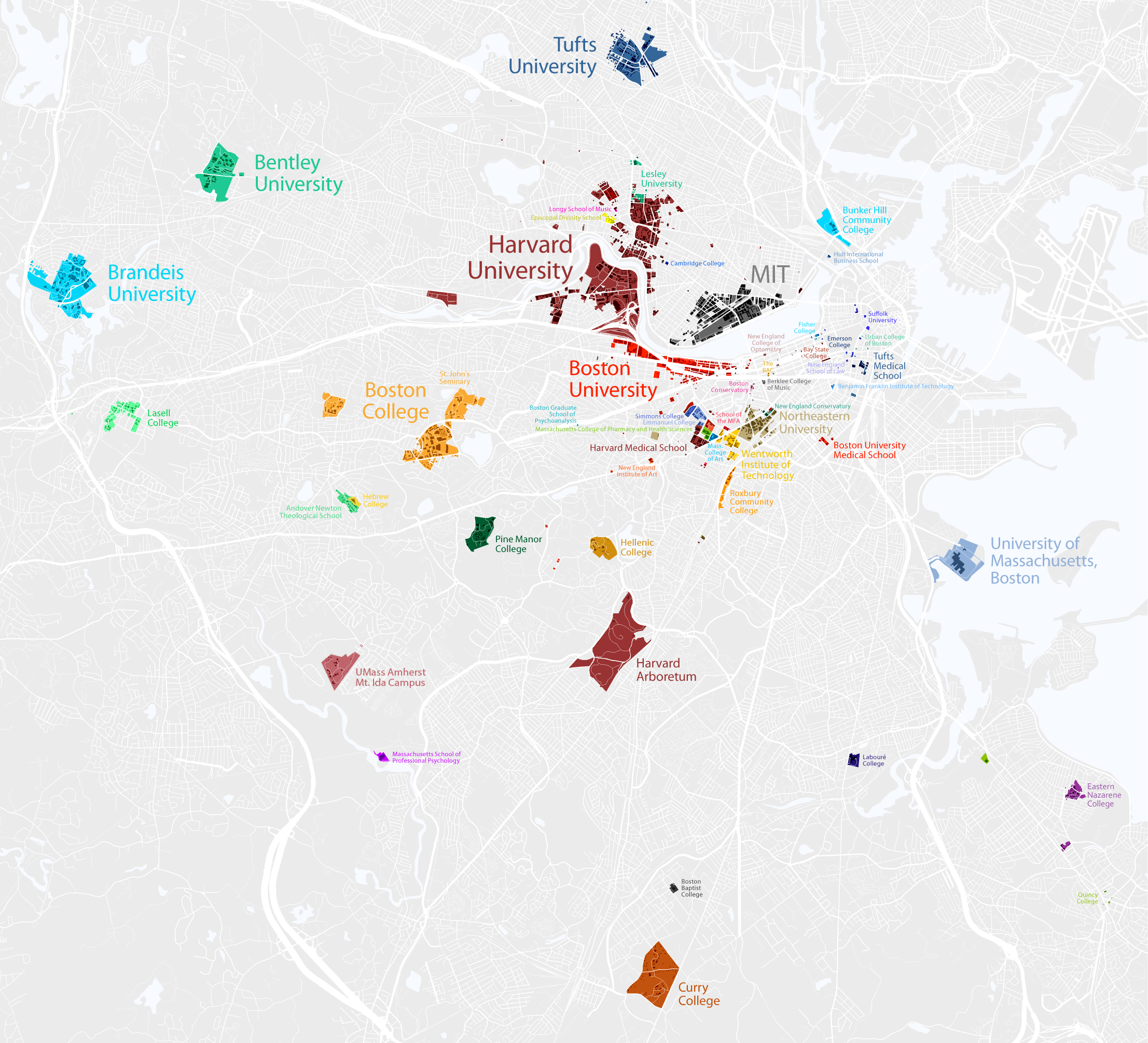
Map of the land owned or leased by colleges and universities in the Boston area as of 2021

This is a list of colleges and universities in metropolitan Boston. Some are located within Boston proper while some are located in neighboring cities and towns, but all are within the 128/95/1 loop. This is closer to the "inner core" definition of Metropolitan Boston, which excludes more suburban North Shore, South Shore and MetroWest regions. Although larger institutions may have several schools, some of which are located in cities other than that of the main campus (such as Harvard Medical School and Tufts University School of Medicine), each institution is listed only once and location is determined by the site of each institution's main campus. Three universities—Harvard and MIT in Cambridge, as well as Tufts in Somerville—make up the "brainpower triangle" of greater Boston, a region defined by universities that have a large local and national influence.

There are a total of 44 institutions of higher education in the defined region, including three junior colleges, 11 colleges that primarily grant baccalaureate and master's degrees, eight research universities, and 22 special-focus institutions. Of these, 39 are private ventures while five are public institutions (four are run by the state of Massachusetts and one is operated by the city of Quincy).

In 2024, enrollment at these colleges and universities ranged from 43 students at Boston Baptist College to 37,737 students at Boston University. The first to be founded was Harvard University, also the oldest institution of higher education in the United States, while the most recently established institution is Sattler College. All but five of these schools are accredited by the New England Commission of Higher Education (NECHE).

== Institutions ==
Name	Location	Control	Classification	Enrollment	Founded (Note: Founding year is institutionally determined. It may differ from the institution's charter year, the year it became an institution of higher education, or the year it took its current name.)	NECHE-accredited
Benjamin Franklin Cummings Institute of Technology	Boston	Private	Special-focus	744	1908	2006
Bentley University	Waltham	Private	Master's	5,333	1917	1966
Berklee College of Music	Boston	Private	Special-focus	8,369	1945	1973
Boston Architectural College	Boston	Private	Special-focus	853	1889	1991
Boston Baptist College	Milton	Private	Special-focus	43	1976	
Boston College	Newton	Private	Research	15,432	1863	1935
Boston Graduate School of Psychoanalysis	Brookline	Private	Special-focus	169	1973	1996
Boston University	Boston	Private	Research	37,737	1839	1929
Brandeis University	Waltham	Private	Research	5,205	1948	1953
Bunker Hill Community College	Boston	Public	Associate's	9,876	1973	1976
Cambridge College	Boston	Private	Master's	1,835	1971	1981
Curry College	Milton	Private	Baccalaureate	1,994	1879	1970
Eastern Nazarene College	Quincy	Private	Baccalaureate	60	1900	1943
Emerson College	Boston	Private	Master's	5,263	1880	1950
Emmanuel College	Boston	Private	Baccalaureate	1,983	1919	1933
Fisher College	Boston	Private	Baccalaureate	1,652	1903	1970
Harvard University	Cambridge	Private	Research	30,259	1636	1929
Hebrew College	Newton	Private	Special-focus	163	1921	1955
Hellenic College and Holy Cross Greek Orthodox School of Theology	Brookline	Private	Special-focus	274	1937	1974
Hult International Business School	Cambridge	Private	Special-focus	2,008	1964	1976
Labouré College	Milton	Private	Special-focus	530	1892	2005
Lasell University	Newton	Private	Baccalaureate	1,668	1851	1932
Lesley University	Cambridge	Private	Master's	2,557	1909	1952
Longy School of Music of Bard College	Cambridge	Private	Special-focus	317	1915	
Massachusetts College of Art and Design	Boston	Public	Special-focus	1,989	1873	1954
Massachusetts College of Pharmacy and Health Sciences	Boston	Private	Special-focus	5,945	1823	1974
Mass General Brigham University of Health Professions	Boston	Private	Special-focus	1,894	1977	1985
Massachusetts Institute of Technology	Cambridge	Private	Research	11,886	1861	1929
New England College of Optometry	Boston	Private	Special-focus	515	1894	1976
New England Conservatory	Boston	Private	Special-focus	853	1867	1951
New England Law | Boston	Boston	Private	Special-focus	1,131	1938	
North Bennet Street School	Boston	Private	Special-focus	155	1881	
Northeastern University	Boston	Private	Research	32,553	1898	1940
Quincy College	Quincy	Public	Associate's	3,022	1958	1980
Roxbury Community College	Boston	Public	Associate's	2,044	1973	1981
Saint John's Seminary	Boston	Private	Special-focus	86	1884	1969
Sattler College	Boston	Private	Special-focus	57	2016	
Simmons University	Boston	Private	Master's	4,666	1899	1929
Suffolk University	Boston	Private	Master's	6,356	1906	1952
Tufts University	Medford	Private	Research	13,599	1852	1929
University of Massachusetts Boston	Boston	Public	Research	15,575	1964	1972
Urban College of Boston	Boston	Private	Special-focus	868	1993	2001
Wentworth Institute of Technology	Boston	Private	Special-focus	4,191	1904	1967
William James College	Newton	Private	Special-focus	967	1974	1984

== See also ==
- List of colleges and universities in Massachusetts for a full listing of the institutions of higher education in Massachusetts.
- Colleges of Worcester Consortium for Worcester-area colleges.
