= Association of Christian College Athletics =

American organization of collegiate athletics

- Abbreviation: ACCA
- Formation: 1983; 43 years ago
- Defunct: 2025; 1 year ago
- Type: Association
- Location: Joplin, Missouri, US
- Region served: United States
- President: Chris Lahm
- Website: accasport.com

The Association of Christian College Athletics (ACCA) was an organization of collegiate athletics in the United States. It was incorporated to provide an opportunity for smaller Christian college members to compete on an equal level of competition with schools of like size. After the ACCA's 2024 men's and women's basketball championship tournaments, updates to its website ceased. By July 2025, the ACCA had allowed the URL for its website to expire, and its Twitter account had been inactive since March 18, 2024.

== History ==
The ACCA was established in 1983 as the "National Bible College Athletic Association" (NBCAA) to provide a national organization to hold championships, name All-Americans, scholar athletes and promote member colleges. The name was changed to the Association of Christian College Athletics (ACCA) in June 2004. A commissioner was hired and a plan for membership growth was established.

The aim of the ACCA was to promote the education and development of students through intercollegiate athletic participation.

== Sports ==
ACCA programs
Sport	Men's	Women's
Basketball	✓	✓
Soccer	✓	✗
Volleyball	✗	✓

== Member schools ==
School	Location
Arlington Baptist University	Arlington, Texas
Barclay College	Haviland, Kansas
Carolina Christian College	Winston-Salem, North Carolina
Champion Christian College	Hot Springs, Arkansas
Community Christian College	Redlands, California
Dallas Christian College	Farmers Branch, Texas
Free Lutheran Bible College and Seminary	Plymouth, Minnesota
Kansas Christian College	Overland Park, Kansas
Mission University	Springfield, Missouri
Oak Hills Christian College	Bemidji, Minnesota
Ozark Christian College	Joplin, Missouri
RHEMA Bible Training College	Broken Arrow, Oklahoma
Southeastern Baptist College	Laurel, Mississippi
Southwestern Adventist University	Keene, Texas
Trinity Bible College and Graduate School	Ellendale, North Dakota
Union College	Lincoln, Nebraska
University of Los Angeles College of Divinity	Compton, California

== Championships ==
=== Fall sports ===
Year	Men's Soccer	Women's Volleyball
2007	Ozark Christian College	Canadian Mennonite University
2008	Central Christian College of the Bible	West Coast Baptist College
2009	Southwestern Christian University	Barclay College
2010	Hillsdale Free Will Baptist College	Hillsdale Free Will Baptist College
2011		Ozark Christian College
2012	Calvary Bible College	Arlington Baptist College
2013		
2014		
2015	Hillsdale Free Will Baptist College	Arlington Baptist College
2016		Randall University
2017	Randall University	Arlington Baptist College
2018		Arlington Baptist College
2019		
2020		
2021	Arlington Baptist College	Arlington Baptist College

=== Winter sports ===
==== Women's basketball ====
Year	Division I	Division II
1983	St. Paul Bible College	
1984	Northwest Christian University	
1985	Northwest Christian University	
1986	Northwest Christian University	North Central University
1987		North Central University
2006	Hillsdale Free Will Baptist College	Association Free Lutheran Bible School
2007	Hillsdale Free Will Baptist College	Free Will Baptist Bible College
2008		
2009	Southwestern Christian University	
2010	RHEMA Bible Training Center	
2011		
2012	Hillsdale Free Will Baptist College	
2013	Hillsdale Free Will Baptist College	
2014	Hillsdale Free Will Baptist College	
2015	Arlington Baptist College	
2016	Arlington Baptist College	---
2017	Arlington Baptist College	---
2018	Arlington Baptist College	---
2019	Arlington Baptist College	---
2020	Arlington Baptist College	---
2021		
2022	Champion Christian College	---
2023	Ozark Christian College	---
2024	Trinity Bible College	---

==== Men's basketball ====
Year	Division I	Division II
1983	Northwest Christian College	
1986	Northwest Christian College	Nebraska Christian College
1988	Life Bible College	
1992	Latin American Bible Institute	
1998	Life Pacific College	
1999	Rhema Bible Training Center	
2005	Rhema Bible Training Center	
2006		Oak Hills Christian College
2007	Southwestern Christian University	Champion Baptist College
2008	Southwestern Christian University	Portland Bible College
2009	Southwestern Christian University	Champion Baptist College
2010		Champion Baptist College
2011		
2012	Free Will Baptist Bible College	---
2013	Dallas Christian College	St. Louis Christian College
2014	Arlington Baptist College	Crossroads College
2015	Arlington Baptist College	---
2016	Dallas Christian College	---
2017	RHEMA Bible Training Center	---
2018	Arlington Baptist College	---
2019	Arlington Baptist College	---
2020	University of Los Angeles College of Divinity	---
2021	Baptist Bible College	---
2022	Arlington Baptist College	
2023	Kansas Christian College	
2024	Ozark Christian College	
