= Joyce Angela Jellison =

American writer

Joyce Angela Jellison-Hounkanrin (born August 7, 1969) is an American author living in New England. She is a graduate of Urban College of Boston and Bay Path College in Longmeadow, Massachusetts. She holds a J.D. degree from Massachusetts School of Law in Andover, Massachusetts.

== Early years ==
Joyce Angela Jellison was born in Philadelphia, Pennsylvania, the youngest of four children. She attended Pennsylvania State University for a short time before leaving and joining the United States Army Reserve. Upon returning home from basic training, she attended the Art Institute of Philadelphia.

== Newspaper career ==
Frustrated with her academic performance and taking the advice of a teacher to focus on writing, Jellison moved to New England. She was a stringer for a local newspaper, The Lynn Sunday Post. "I think I was the worst reporter there was," she says of this time. "I was definitely the hungriest and took any story that came my way. I hung around a lot and as a result I stumbled on some great stories. I did not know anything about journalism. I got that job with an essay I wrote at home and an article from a high school news project."

In 1999, she graduated from Urban College of Boston, a two-year college. She moved to Lenoir, North Carolina, where she was hired by the Lenoir News-Topic as a business writer. That year she won the 1999 North Carolina Press Association Award for News Enterprise Journalism for her stories about life in prison and an Associated Press Citation for her work during the criminal trial of Robert Frederick Glass, a man convicted of murdering Sharon Lopatka, a Maryland woman.

"It was my first exposure to daily news," Jellison says. "I learned as I wrote and I managed to focus on stories that were of interest to me. I learned I had a taste for uncovering social injustices and this is what I did or tried to do. At the same time, I was battling the good ole boy mentality that exists in America's newsrooms. I was the only black and the only woman at a lot of these newspapers and it was a constant challenge."

After nearly a year at the News-Topic, Jellison was hired as a crime reporter for the Hickory Daily Record. In 2000, she was awarded the Media General Award for Journalism Excellence for her story about AIDS in prison, the article was picked up by the Associated Press, and highlighted the need for more intensive medical care and HIV education in the North Carolina Prison System.

Jellison also wrote an article for Poz magazine, "Hair Come the Condoms", which detailed the efforts of hairstylists in Durham, North Carolina, to educate their customers on the importance of using condoms to prevent the spread of sexually transmitted diseases.

In addition to her stories focusing on HIV and AIDS, Jellison wrote articles on North Carolina's Death Row. Motivated by her need to cover larger stories, she accepted a job as a city government reporter for the Charlotte Leader, in Charlotte, North Carolina. In 2002, she would move to Elizabeth City, North Carolina, to work as a layout editor for the Daily Advance.

"I think I have worked in every capacity possible in a newsroom," Jellison has said. "The one thing I did not like was editing. It was like being trapped in a cage. I would read stories and knew I could write them better or at least ask the questions that were not be asked."

== Poet ==
Jellison moved back to Boston in 2005. Since her return she has transitioned from journalism to performing her poetry as a spoken-word artist in various venues in the New England area such as the famed Lizard Lounge and Cantab Lounge in Cambridge, Massachusetts. Her work has been featured in The Daily News Tribune, The Boston Globe and The MetroWest Daily News. She has said she does not miss journalism and enjoys the freedom of being a freelance writer. She is a staff writer for Hapalife.com, an online magazine examining race and identity.

Jellison has also been publicly forthcoming on her battle with bipolar disorder. "It is not something I could hide," she has said. "I mean there were times when it was obvious I was balancing the reality in my head and the place in which my body exists. If someone ever asked I never lied - but most people were afraid to ask or it didn't matter. As long as I produced the stories it didn't matter to most editors."

She is the author of Where Everything Fits Beautifully, released on April 11, 2007, Black Apple, a collection of poems, short stories, and essays released in August 2008, and Tongue (2010). Her work has been compared to that of Lucille Clifton and Nikki Giovanni. In 2018, Ms. Hounkanrin published her The Girl with Moons in her Braids, a children's book about an Afro-Latina girl living in the Bronx. That work was followed by When They Split My Soul Flowers Burst Forth (2020) and Pretty Little Cannibals (2023).
