= United States Air Force Chaplain Corps =

Clergy and enlisted religious affairs

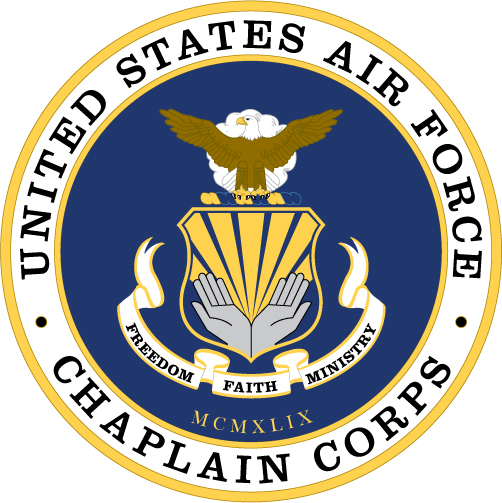
United States Air Force Chaplain Service coat of arms.

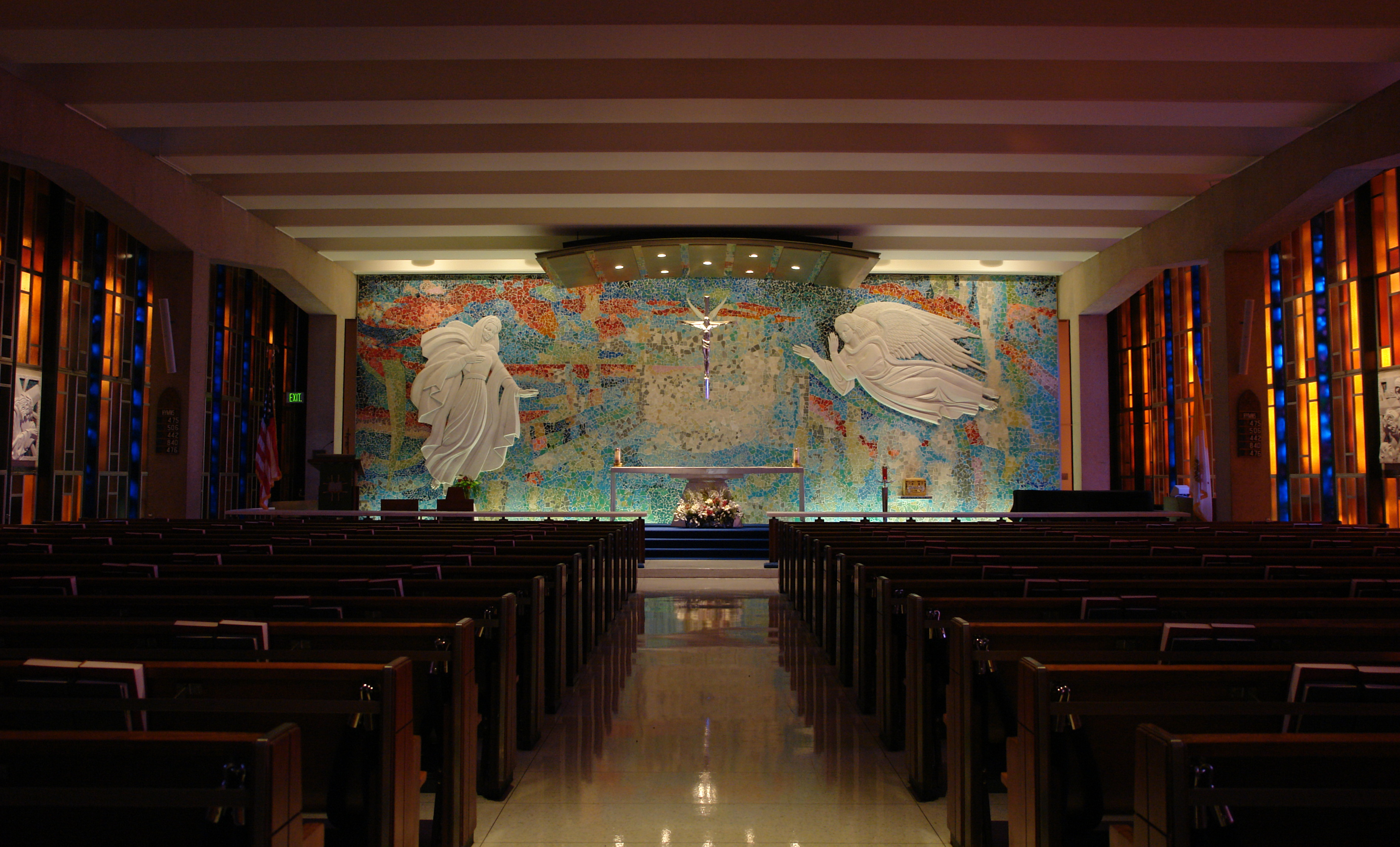
The Catholic Chapel in the Air Force Academy Cadet Chapel.

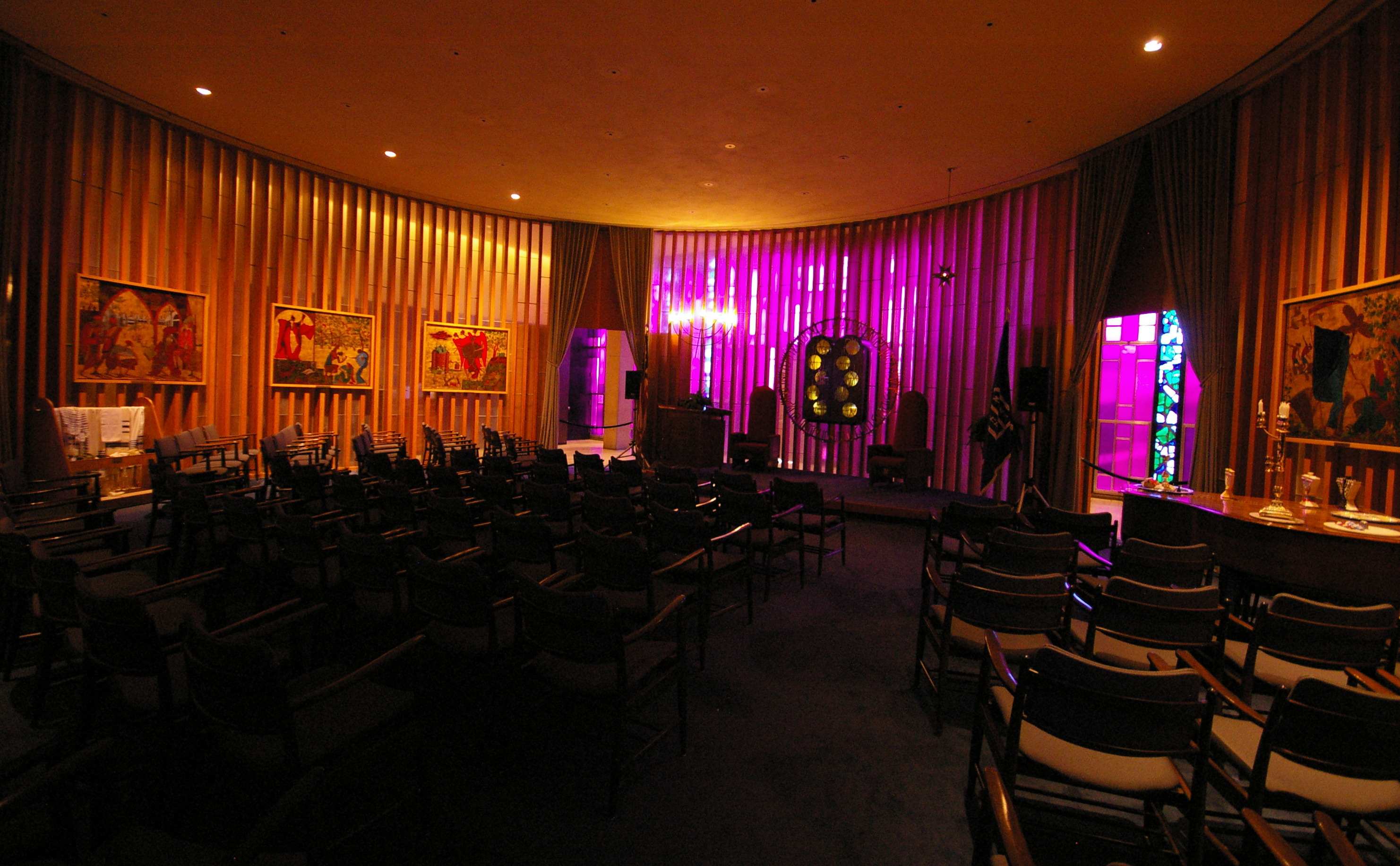
The Jewish Chapel in the Air Force Academy Cadet Chapel.

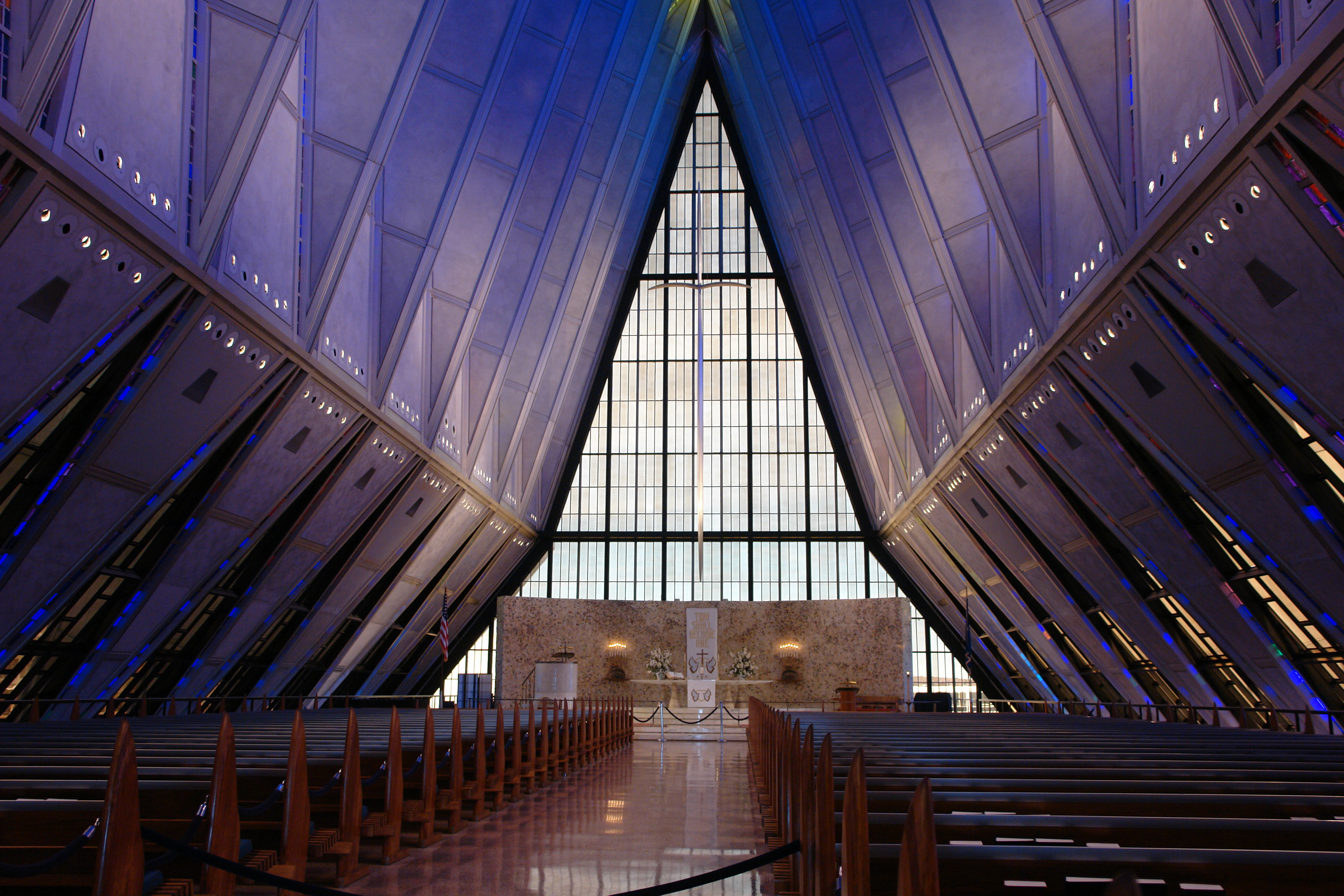
The Protestant Chapel in the Air Force Academy Cadet Chapel.

The Chaplain Corps of the United States Air Force (USAF) is composed of both clergy(commissioned officers who have been endorsed and ordained by a religious organization) and enlisted Religious Affairs Airmen. As military chaplains, their main purpose is to support the free exercise of religion by members of the military service, their dependents, and other authorized personnel. They also provide advice on spiritual, ethical, moral, and religious-accommodation issues to the leadership of the United States Department of War.

Air Force chaplains come from a variety of religious backgrounds, including Buddhism, Catholicism, Eastern Orthodox Christianity, Islam, Judaism, and Protestantism, and any other religious organization with an endorser that has been recognized by the Armed Forces Chaplains Board.

== Mission statement ==
While serving as a visible reminder of the Holy, the Air Force Chaplain Corps provides spiritual care and the opportunity for Air Force members and their families to exercise their constitutional right to freedom of religion.

== History ==
=== Beginnings ===
The first American military chaplaincy was established by the Continental Congress on 29 July 1775. Chaplains were paid $20 per month, a captain's salary, and required no formal ordination or endorsement by a religious organization. During the American Civil War, attempts were made by both government and church organization to increase professionalism. Ordination by an authorized ecclesiastical body became a legal requirement and the non-combatant status of chaplains was officially recognized.

=== Air Force ===
The first Air Chaplain of the United States Army Air Force was Captain Charles I. Carpenter, appointed 28 July 1942. Although the United States Air Force became a separate department on 18 September 1947, following the passage of the National Security Act, the Army opposed the creation of a separate Air Force chaplaincy as it would violate the Spaatz-Eisenhower Agreement, which stated that parallel organizations in the Army and the Air Force would not be approved unless organically necessary, and would serve as a precedent for the separation of other services. Carpenter, on the other hand, emphasized the need for a shared sense of identity between chaplains and the men they served and favored a separate Air Force chaplaincy. On 10 May 1949, after consulting with Carpenter, General Carl Spaatz ordered the institution of a separate Air Force chaplaincy; fewer than 10 of the 458 active duty chaplains elected to remain in the Army. Carpenter was promoted to major general and was appointed the first Air Force Chief of Chaplains, serving from 1949 to 1958.

The Air Force Chaplain Assistant Specialist Career was established in 1948. The current term is a Religious Affairs Airman (RAA).

== Leadership ==
The Chief of Chaplains of the United States Air Force (CCHAF) is the senior chaplain in the United States Air Force, the leader of the U.S. Air Force Chaplain Corps, and the senior adviser on religious issues to the Secretary and Chief of Staff of the United States Air Force. The CCHAF is responsible for establishing an effective chaplain program that meets the religious needs of all members of the Air Force by leading an Air Force Chaplain Corps of approximately 2,200 chaplains and chaplain assistants from the active and Air Reserve components. As a member of the Armed Forces Chaplains Board, the CCHAF advises the Secretary of Defense and Joint Chiefs of Staff on religious, ethical and quality-of-life concerns. The position of Chief of Chaplains is currently held by Major General Trent C. Davis, who is the 21st Chief. Since 2020, the Chief of Chaplains of the Air Force has also had the dual title of Chief of Chaplains of the Space Force. Chaplain Davis is the third Chief of Chaplains of the Space Force.

The Air Force Deputy Chief of Chaplains assists the Chief of Chaplains in directing and maintaining the Chaplain Corps.

The Religious Affairs Air Force Career Field Manager runs the religious affairs career field, preparing Religious Affairs Airmen to support the Air Force Chaplain Corps and advising the Air Force Chief of Chaplains on policy matters regarding RAA and the Air Force Chaplain Corps. The position is currently held by Chief Master Sergeant Chambers.

== Air Force Chaplain Corps College ==
The Air Force Chaplain Corps College (AFCCC) is located at the Ira C. Eaker Center for Professional Development at Maxwell AFB, Alabama.

== Prayers ==
- Air Force Hymn

== See also ==
=== Roles ===
- Chaplain
- United States military chaplains
- Religious Affairs Specialist (Army)
- Religious Program Specialist (Navy)
- Religious Affairs (Air Force)

=== Honors ===
- Chaplain's Medal for Heroism

=== Specialty insignia ===
- United States Air Force chaplain symbols
- Religious pins
- Air Force occupational badges
- Badges and insignia
- Insignia of chaplain schools in the United States military

=== Locations ===
- United States Air Force Academy Cadet Chapel
- Chaplains Hill (Arlington National Cemetery)

=== Other military chaplaincies ===
- United States Army Chaplain Corps
- United States Navy Chaplain Corps
- Chaplain of the United States Coast Guard
- Chaplain of the United States Marine Corps
