= Richard Carr (chaplain) =

Chief of Chaplains of the US Air Force (1925–2002)

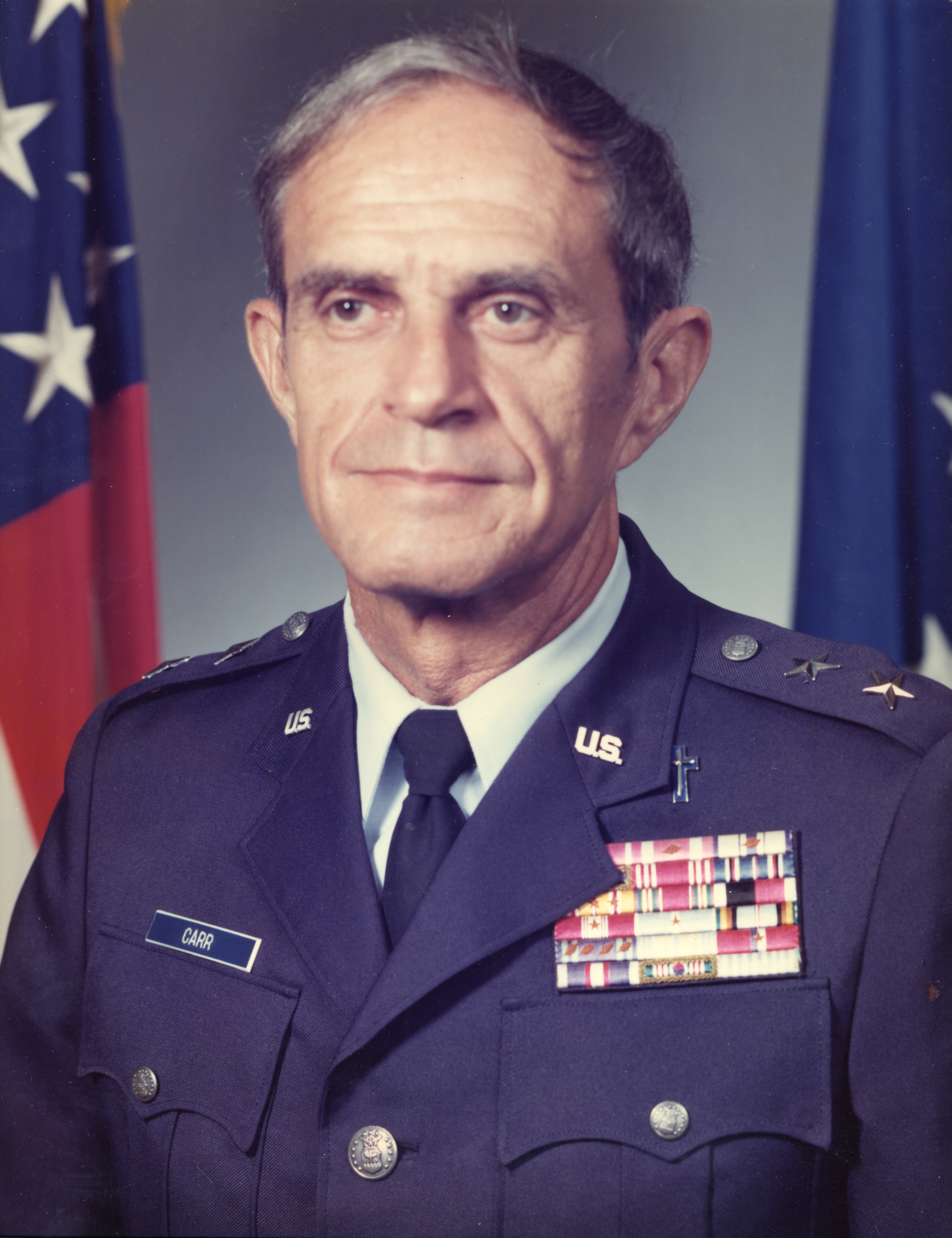
- Official U.S. Air Force Photo
- Born: December 3, 1925; El Centro, California, U.S.
- Died: November 9, 2002 (aged 76); Springfield, Virginia, U.S.
- Military career
- Allegiance: United States
- Branch: United States Air Force
- Service years: 1943–1946 (Army); 1951–1952 (Army); 1954–1955 (Air Force Reserve); 1955–1982 (Air Force)
- Rank: Major general
- Commands: Chief of Chaplains of the United States Air Force

Richard Carr (December 3, 1925 – November 9, 2002) was Chief of Chaplains of the United States Air Force.

== Biography ==
Born in El Centro, California, in 1925, Carr was an ordained minister in the United Church of Christ. He was a graduate of Whitworth College and Fuller Theological Seminary. Carr married Jeanne Robertson, with whom he had three children. He died of leukemia on November 9, 2002, and is buried at Arlington National Cemetery.

== Career ==
Carr originally joined the United States Army Air Corps in 1943 and served with the 11th Bombardment Group during World War II. He was released from active duty following the war.

In 1951, Carr was recalled to active duty as a member of the United States Air Force to serve in the Korean War as a crewman in air search and rescue. He was again released from active duty the following year before joining the Air Force Reserve in 1954.

Carr was once again recalled to active duty in 1955. After serving in various locations around the world, he was assigned to The Pentagon in 1965. From there, he was stationed at Wheeler Air Force Base before becoming Chaplain of the 314th Air Division. Later, he served at Shaw Air Force Base and Headquarters Tactical Air Command before being named Deputy Chief of Chaplains of the United States Air Force with the rank of brigadier general in 1976. He was promoted to Chief of Chaplains and achieved the rank of major general in 1978 before retiring in 1982.

Awards he received include the Legion of Merit, the Meritorious Service Medal with three oak leaf clusters and the Air Force Commendation Medal. Carr served a total of 32 years, of which 4 in the Army and 28 in the Air Force.
