= John A. Collins (chaplain) =

United States Air Force general (1931–2003)

John A. Collins, CSsR
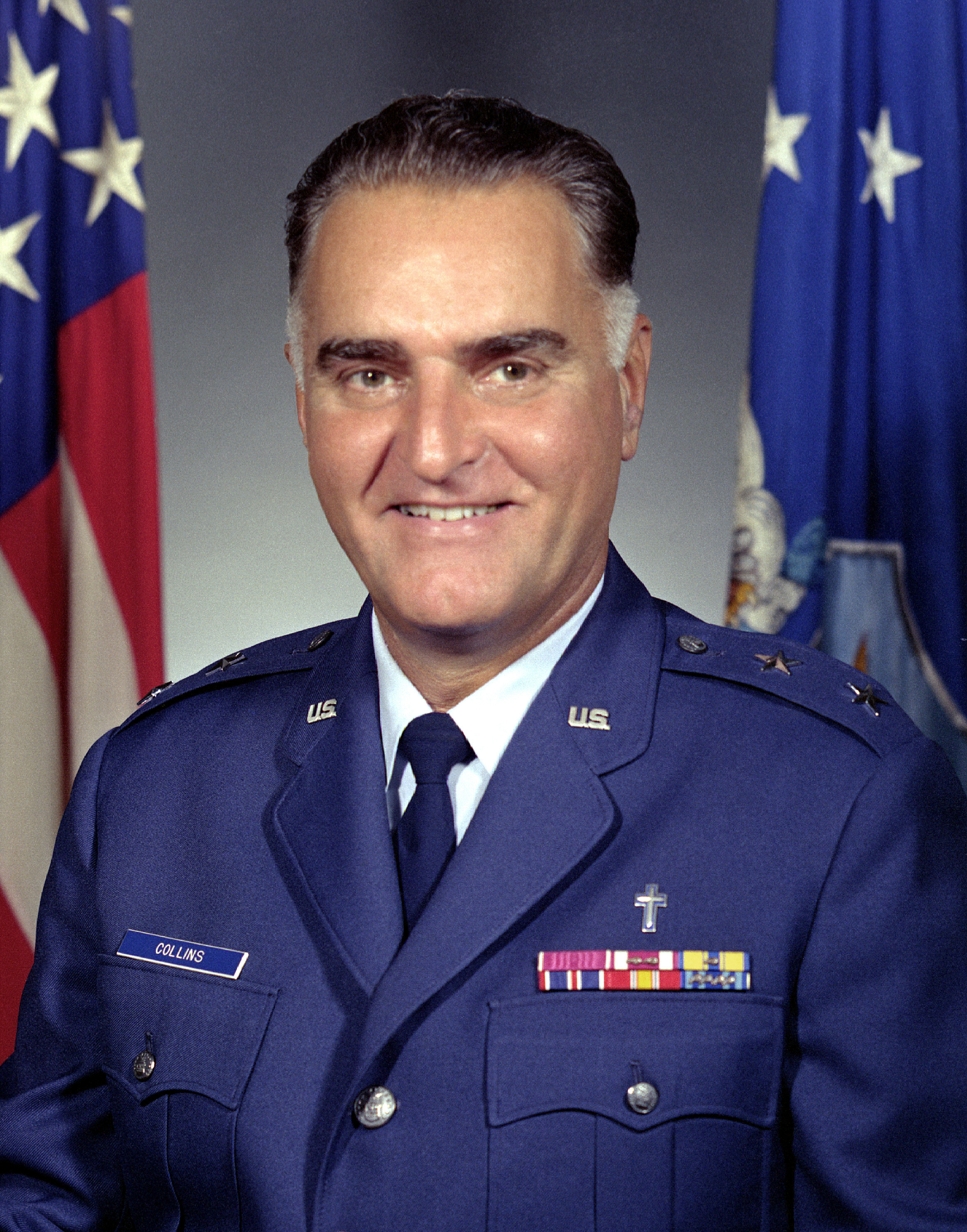
- Born: September 17, 1931; Boston, Massachusetts, US
- Died: May 7, 2003 (aged 71); Long Branch, New Jersey, US
- Military career
- Branch: United States Air Force
- Rank: Major general
- Commands: Chief of Chaplains of the United States Air Force

John A. Collins, CSsR (September 17, 1931 – May 7, 2003) was Chief of Chaplains of the United States Air Force.

== Biography ==
Born in Boston, Massachusetts, in 1931, Collins was an ordained Roman Catholic priest in the Redemptorist Order. Collins died on May 7, 2003, and is buried at Arlington National Cemetery.

== Career ==
Collins joined the United States Air Force in 1960. Eventually, he would become Deputy Chief of Chaplains of the United States Air Force in 1980 before being promoted to Chief of Chaplains with the rank of major general in 1982. He held the position until his retirement in 1985.

Awards he received include the Legion of Merit, the Meritorious Service Medal with two oak leaf clusters, the Air Force Commendation Medal with oak leaf cluster, the Outstanding Unit Award and the National Defense Service Medal.
