= Mission University =

Private college in Springfield, Missouri

- Former names: Baptist Bible College (1950–2024)
- Motto: Life Change U
- Type: Private Bible college
- Established: 1950
- Religious affiliation: Baptist Bible Fellowship International
- President: Mark Milioni
- Undergraduates: 274
- Postgraduates: 32
- Location: Springfield, Missouri, United States; 37°14′24″N 93°17′05″W
- Campus: Suburban, 38 acres (15.4 ha)
- Sporting affiliations: NCCAA Division I – Central; AMC - NAIA
- Mascot: Patriot
- Website: www.mission.edu

Mission University (MU) is a private Baptist Bible college in Springfield, Missouri. Founded in 1950, MU focuses on training Christian professionals and ministers. It offers accredited associate, bachelor's, and master's degrees.

== History ==
Mission has its origins as Baptist Bible College in a May 1950 meeting of Baptist ministers at the Texas Hotel in Fort Worth. In the summer of 1950 land was bought at the intersection of Summit Avenue and Kearney Street in Springfield, Missouri. This former 5-acre (2.02 ha) city park was turned into dormitories, which opened on September 5, 1950. From the founding until 1975, George Beauchamp Vick, pastor of the Temple Baptist Church of Detroit, Michigan (currently NorthRidge Church), was the president of the college.

Vick's executive vice president, W. E. Dowell Sr., became president for the following eight years. In 1983, A. V. Henderson led the school for three years. In 1986, Leland Kennedy presided over the institution for 15 years. In 2001, BBC received probationary accreditation from the North Central Association of Colleges and Schools. Mike Randall was installed as the fifth president on February 20, 2002. Accreditation was received in 2005, due in part to Randall's hard work but mostly due to the hard work of Russell Dell who served as Baptist Bible College's academic dean for many years. In 2008, Jim Edge was appointed to office, and resigned after three years. The board of trustees named Ron Sears as interim president and began the search for a new president. In 2012, by a unanimous vote of the trustees, Mark Milioni was named as the new president.

Following a decline from its peak enrollment of over 2,600 in the 1970s, Baptist Bible College has continued to see increased enrollment since 2013. In 2016 the school was placed on probation by its regional accreditor and has seen a decrease in enrollment. That probation was lifted in the spring of 2019.

On January 25, 2024, the college was renamed Mission University effective immediately, in a press conference on campus.

== Academics ==
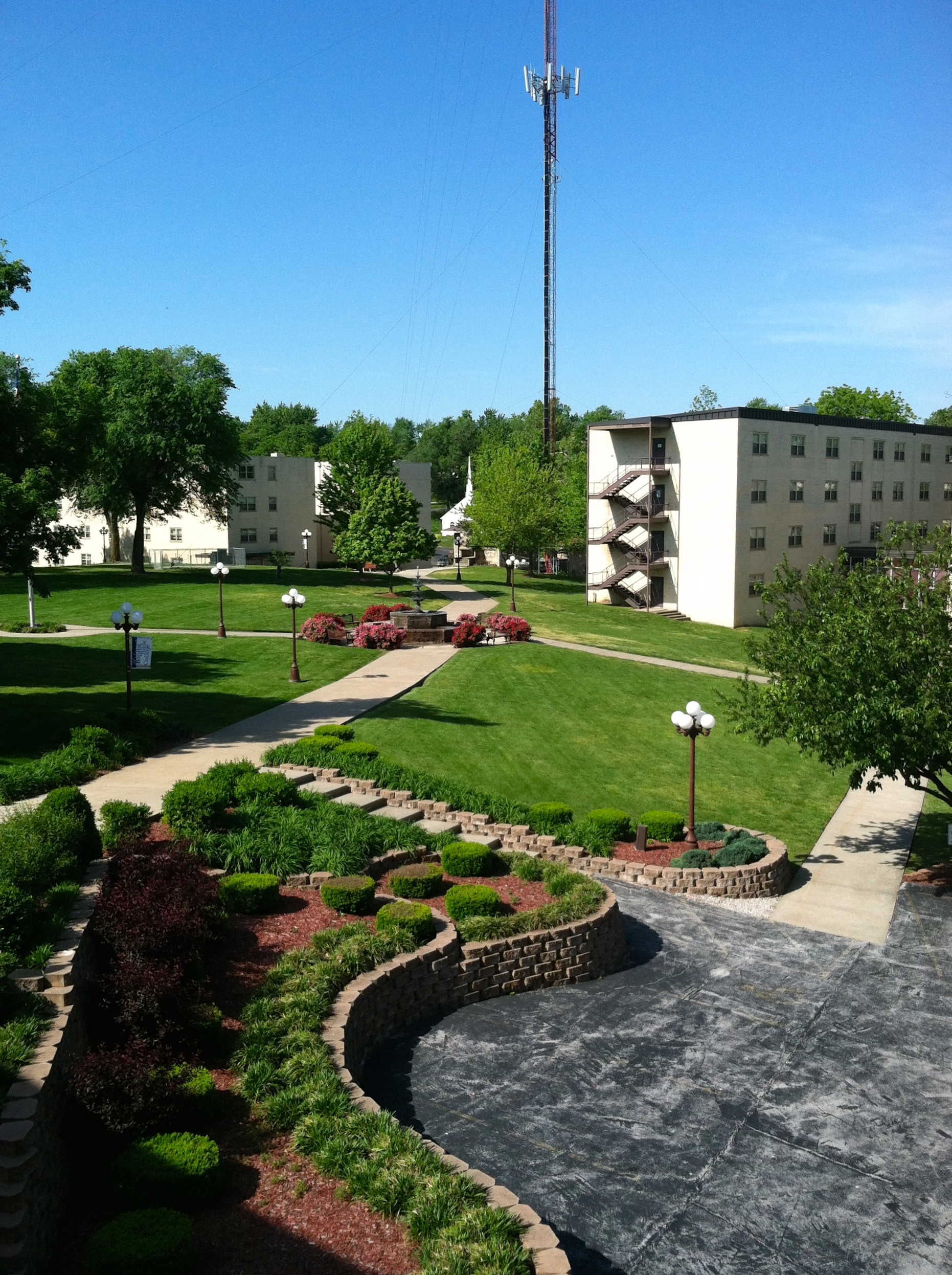
A view of the campus of Mission University.

Mission, then known as Baptist Bible College, was first accredited by the North Central Association of Colleges and Schools in 2001 and is also accredited by the Association for Biblical Higher Education (ABHE). Although the college was placed on probation by the Higher Learning Commission in 2016, it was removed from probation in 2019.

== Athletics ==
The Mission athletic teams are called the Patriots. The college is a member of the National Christian College Athletic Association (NCCAA), primarily competing as an independent in the Central Region of the Division I level.

The college has undergone revitalization and expansion of athletics since 2019, including the return of soccer and baseball to the BBC campus in 2023. As of the 2023-24 academic year, Mission competes in ten intercollegiate varsity sports: Men's sports include baseball, basketball, golf, and soccer; while women's sports include basketball, cross country, golf, soccer, softball, and volleyball.

On October 2, 2023, it was announced that the Patriots would be joining the National Association of Intercollegiate Athletics (NAIA) as a member of the American Midwest Conference (AMC) beginning with the 2024–25 athletic year.

=== Men's basketball ===
The Patriots men's basketball team won the 2022 NCCAA Division I National Championship by defeating Lancaster Bible College 77–70. The Patriots won the 2021 Association of Christian College Athletics (ACCA) National Tournament against the University of Los Angeles College of Divinity (ULA) 68-60. The men's basketball team also won NCCAA Division II National Championship titles in 1978, 1981, 1982, 1983, and 1984.

== Notable alumni ==
- Jerry Falwell – Bachelor of Theology in 1956
- Jerry Prevo – former President of Liberty University
