= Charles I. Carpenter =

United States Air Force general

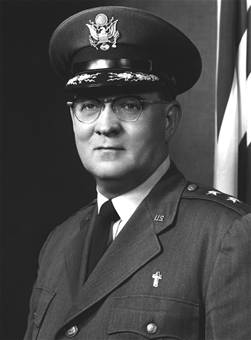
- Born: January 13, 1906; Wilmington, Delaware, U.S.
- Died: February 22, 1994 (aged 88); Milford, Delaware, U.S.
- Military career
- Allegiance: United States
- Branch: United States Air Force
- Rank: Major general
- Commands: Chief of Chaplains of the United States Air Force
- Conflicts: World War II
- Awards: Legion of Merit with oak leaf cluster Belgium Military Cross

Rev. Charles Irving Carpenter (January 13, 1906 – February 22, 1994) was an American pastor and the first Chief of Chaplains of the United States Air Force.

== Early life and education ==
Born in Wilmington, Delaware, in 1906, Carpenter was an ordained Methodist pastor. He was a graduate of Bucknell University and Drew University.

== Career ==
Carpenter originally joined the United States Army in 1936 and was assigned to Fort H. G. Wright.

In 1942, Carpenter was assigned to The Pentagon to establish chaplaincy work in the United States Army Air Forces. He was later reassigned to the United States Air Forces in Europe during the closing months of World War II. Following the war, he returned to The Pentagon.

After the creation of the United States Air Force, Carpenter was named the first Chief of Chaplains in 1948. The following year, he was appointed to the grade of major general. Carpenter remained Chief of Chaplains until 1958, when he took up assignment at the United States Air Force Academy.

Awards he received include the Legion of Merit with oak leaf cluster and the Belgian Military Cross, First Class.

== Death ==
Carpenter died on February 22, 1994.
