= John P. McDonough (chaplain) =

United States Air Force chaplain (1928–2021)

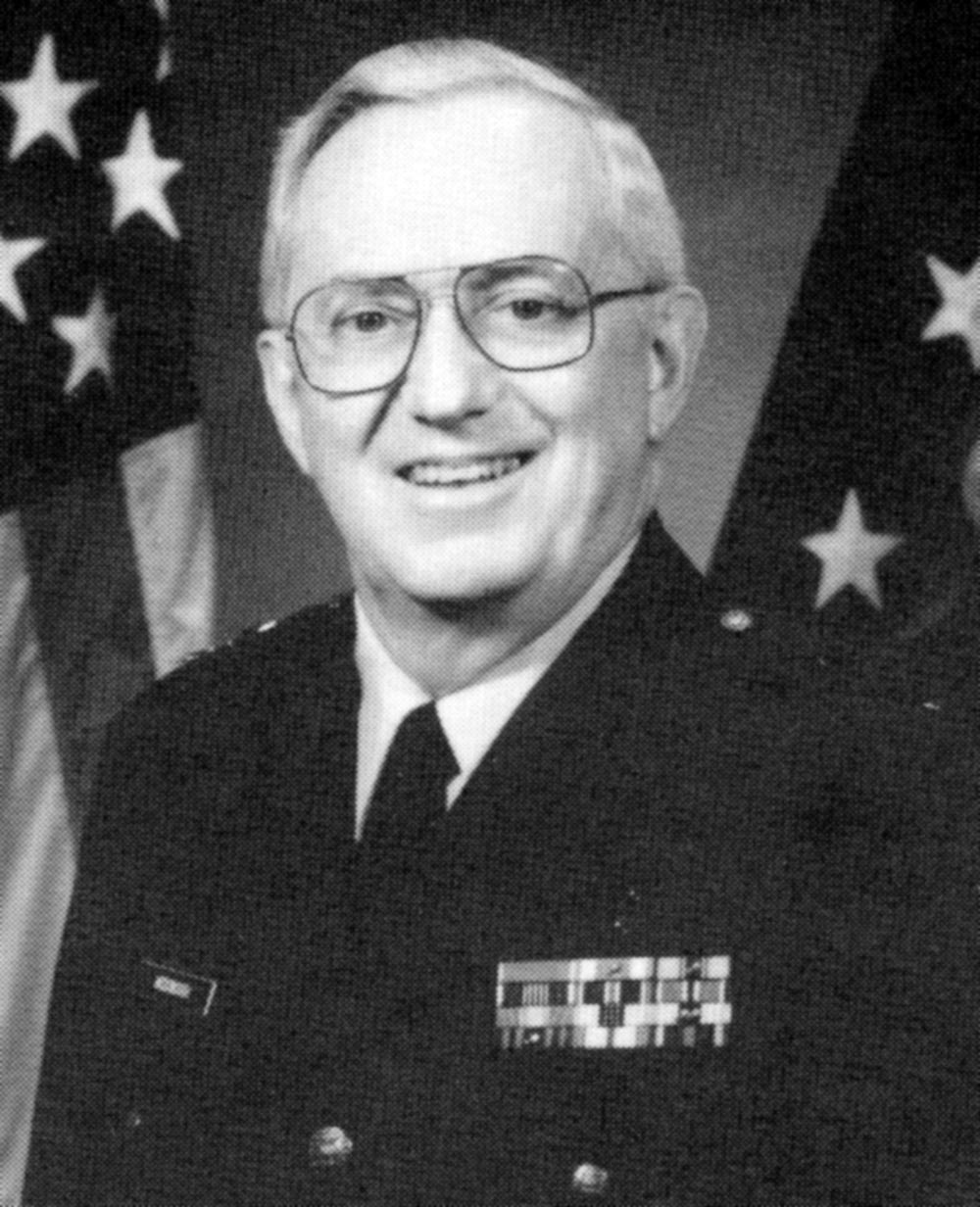
- Born: May 24, 1928; Boston, Massachusetts, U.S.
- Died: November 17, 2021 (aged 93); Boston, Massachusetts, U.S.
- Military career
- Allegiance: United States of America
- Branch: United States Air Force
- Service years: 1963–1991
- Rank: Major general
- Commands: Chief of Chaplains of the United States Air Force
- Awards: Legion of Merit, Meritorious Service Medal with oak leaf cluster, Air Force Commendation Medal with oak leaf cluster, Army Commendation Medal, Outstanding Unit Award

John P. McDonough (May 24, 1928 – November 17, 2021) was an American Air Force officer who served as Chief of Chaplains of the United States Air Force.

== Early life and education ==
Born in Boston, Massachusetts in 1928, McDonough was an ordained Catholic priest. He was a graduate of Saint John's Seminary.

== Career ==
McDonough joined the United States Air Force in 1963 and was stationed at Eglin Air Force Base.

In 1982, McDonough became Command Chaplain at Headquarters, United States Air Forces in Europe. From there, he served as Command Chaplain at Headquarters, Tactical Air Command from 1984 until 1985, when he became Deputy Chief of Chaplains of the United States Air Force. He was promoted to Chief of Chaplains with the rank of major general in 1988 and held the position until his retirement in 1991.

Awards he received include the Legion of Merit, the Meritorious Service Medal with oak leaf cluster, the Air Force Commendation Medal with oak leaf cluster, the Army Commendation Medal and the Outstanding Unit Award.

After his military retirement in 1991, Msgr. McDonough was named the 12th Pastor of St. John the Baptist Parish in Peabody, Massachusetts.

== Personal life ==
McDonough died in Boston on November 17, 2021, at the age of 93.
