= J. Frank Norris =

American pastor

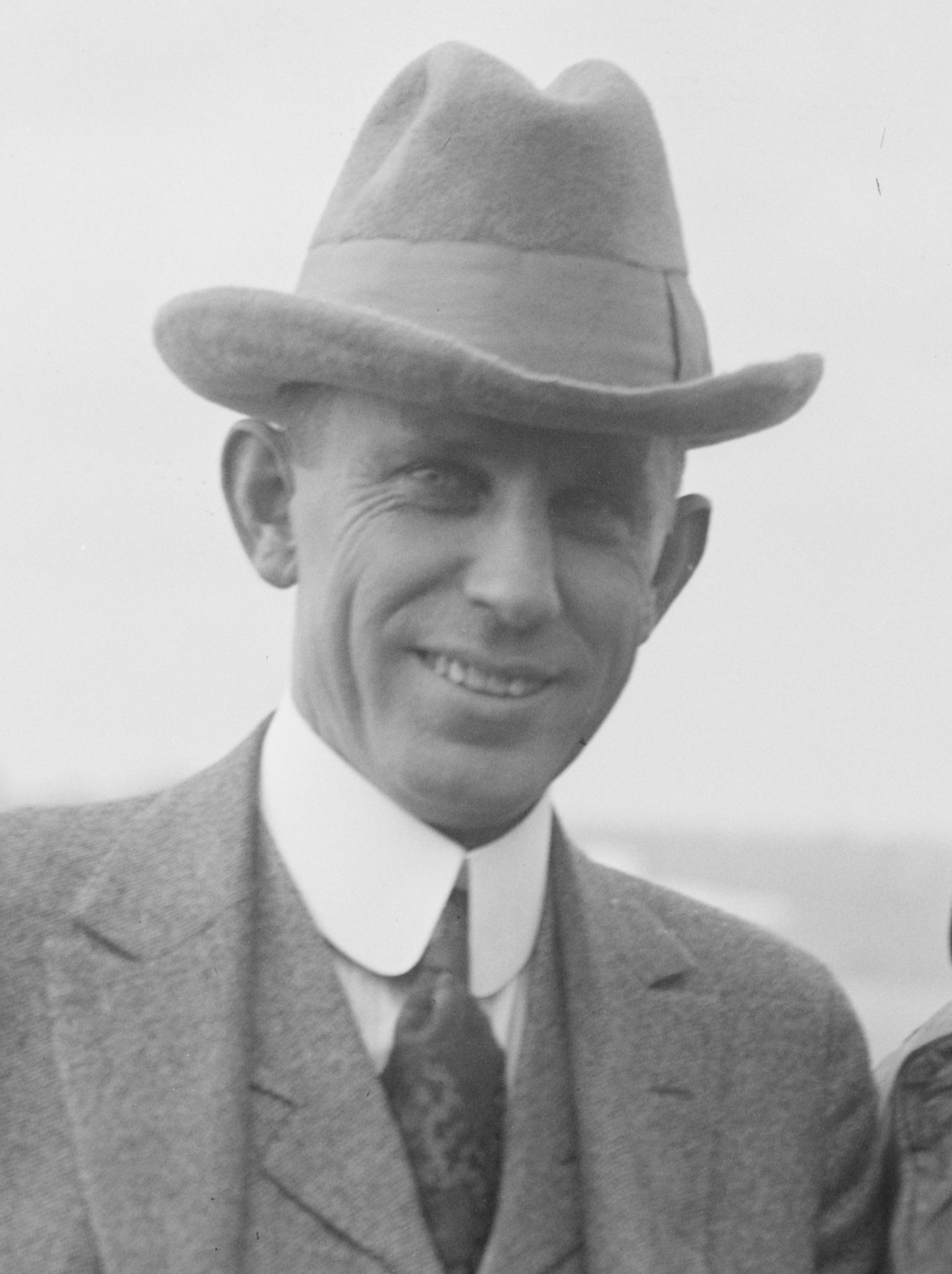
- Born: September 18, 1877; Dadeville, Alabama, US
- Died: August 20, 1952 (aged 74); Jacksonville, Florida, US
- Education: Baylor University; Southern Baptist Theological Seminary
- Occupations: Pastor, First Baptist Church of Fort Worth (1909–1952); Pastor, Temple Baptist Church in Detroit, Michigan (1935–1951); Editor Baptist Standard (prior to 1909); Publisher, The Searchlight; Anti-communist lecturer
- Years active: 1897–1952
- Spouse: Lillian Gaddy (m.1902)
- Children: 4

John Franklyn Norris, more commonly known as J. Frank Norris (September 18, 1877 – August 20, 1952) was a Baptist preacher and controversial Christian fundamentalist.

== Personal life ==
J. Frank Norris was born in Dadeville in Tallapoosa County in eastern Alabama, but the family shortly moved to Arkansas and then back to Columbiana in Shelby County in central Alabama. In the late 1880s, the Norrises purchased land near Hubbard in Hill County, Texas, about thirty miles north of Waco, where they farmed. James Warner Norris was an alcoholic, and Frank Norris claimed that his father once beat him severely after he had emptied his liquor bottles. In 1891, both were shot by an acquaintance of Warner Norris, and Frank said he did not fully recuperate for three years.

== Ministry ==
Norris was converted at a Baptist revival meeting in the early 1890s, and in 1897, he became pastor of Mount Antioch Baptist Church in Mount Calm in Hill County, Texas. The following year he enrolled in Baptist-affiliated Baylor University in Waco, which he attended from 1898 to 1903. He then earned a Master of Theology degree from the Southern Baptist Theological Seminary in Louisville, Kentucky. In 1905, Norris returned to Texas as the pastor of the McKinney Avenue Baptist Church in Dallas. He resigned that post in 1907 to become editor of the Baptist Standard. Norris is credited with ending the Texas Baptist newspaper war, with moving Southwestern Baptist Theological Seminary from Waco to Fort Worth, and with persuading the state legislature to abolish racetrack gambling.

In 1909, Norris sold his interest in the Baptist Standard and accepted the pastorate of the First Baptist Church in Fort Worth, where he served for forty-four years until his death. In 1912, Norris was acquitted of arson and perjury charges related to fires that respectively destroyed his church auditorium and severely damaged his home. A second fire razed the structure in 1929, and rebuilding began at the advent of the Great Depression. Norris was also the radio pastor of, variously, KFQB, KTAT and then KSAT (not to be confused with KTSA and KSAT-TV, both in San Antonio), where he started his and the first regular radio ministry of Fort Worth, in the 1920s.

The height of Norris' career came in the 1920s, when he became the leader of the fundamentalist movement in Texas by attacking the teaching of "that hell-born, Bible-destroying, deity-of-Christ-denying, German rationalism known as evolution" at Baylor University. Because of his attacks on Baylor and denominational leaders, Norris and his church were denied seats at the annual meetings of the Baptist General Convention of Texas in 1922 and 1923.

In his 1926 sermon series "Rum and Romanism", Norris attacked Mayor H. C. Meacham of Fort Worth, whom he accused of misappropriating funds for Roman Catholic causes. That same year, Norris killed lumberman Dexter Elliott Chipps, a friend of Meacham, in Norris's church office. Norris claimed Chipps had threatened his life, and when Norris was tried for murder, he was acquitted on grounds of self-defense even though Chipps was unarmed.

During 1928, Norris campaigned against the election of the Democrat Al Smith to the presidency and voiced anti-Catholic views from the pulpit, his radio station, and his weekly newspaper. Herbert C. Hoover, the Republican nominee, won the election and carried Texas as well, the first member of that party ever to prevail in a Texas general election.

In 1935, Norris accepted the pastorate of a second church, Temple Baptist Church in Detroit, Michigan. By 1946, the combined membership of the two congregations was more than 26,000. For sixteen years, Norris commuted by train and plane between the two churches.

Norris and Ben M. Bogard, who in 1924 founded the American Baptist Association, were often at odds. Bogard claimed that Norris was vain and prone to exaggerate Norris' ministerial success. Though he accused Norris of failing to preach the fundamentals of the faith, the two in time developed a begrudging friendship. Bogard said, "When I get to heaven I expect to find Frank Norris there in spite of that wicked streak that runs through him."

In 1941, Norris faced a $25,000 libel judgment payable to another Baptist minister, R. E. White, because of remarks about White in Norris' Detroit denominational paper, The Fundamentalist. Norris exhausted all appeals to the Texas Supreme Court. The publicity about the suit weakened Norris' hold over his fellow fundamentalists.

In September 1947, while on a tour of Europe, Norris secured an audience with Pope Pius XII and declared that the pope was "the last Gibraltar in Europe against Communism." Thereafter, Norris took the position that communism was more dangerous than Catholicism, and some of Norris's erstwhile allies, such as Toronto evangelist T. T. Shields, criticized him for "folly".

In the late 1930s, Norris organized a group of independent, premillennial Baptist churches into the Premillennial Missionary Baptist Fellowship (later the World Baptist Fellowship), in an attempt to combat what he believed were socialist, liberal, and "modernist" tendencies within the Southern Baptist Convention. Norris's group established the Fundamentalist Baptist Bible Institute, now known as Arlington Baptist University.

After World War II, when John Birch, a graduate of his seminary in Fort Worth, was killed by the Chinese communists, Norris renewed his attack on communist influences in the United States. Norris's premillennial views led him to urge President Harry Truman to recognize and support the new state of Israel.

Norris published a religious newspaper, The Searchlight, the front page of which had a picture of Norris grasping a Bible in one hand and a searchlight in the other while Satan cowered in the opposite lower corner. Norris died of a heart attack while attending a youth camp at Jacksonville, Florida, in 1952. He was succeeded at the First Baptist Church of Fort Worth by Homer Ritchie, who pastored the church for thirty years.
