= Boston Baptist College =

Private college in Boston, MA

- Former names: Baptist Bible Institute East, Baptist Bible College East
- Motto: Think-Discover-Impact
- Type: Private college
- Established: 1976
- Religious affiliation: Baptist Bible Fellowship International
- President: David Melton
- Undergraduates: 130
- Location: Boston and Milton, Massachusetts, United States; 42.25389°N 71.11000°W
- Campus: Urban/Suburban
- Nickname: Revolution
- Website: www.boston.edu

Boston Baptist College is a private Baptist college in Boston, Massachusetts.

== History ==
Boston Baptist was founded in 1976 by A.V. Henderson and John Rawlings of Baptist Bible Fellowship International as Baptist Bible Institute East at Shrub Oak, New York. In 1981, the school moved to its present location in Boston. In 2002, the name was changed from Baptist Bible College East to Boston Baptist College.

== Academics ==
Boston Baptist College offers a bachelor's degree, an associate degree, and a certificate, all in Biblical Studies. The library collection holds over 75,000 volumes. The college is accredited by the Transnational Association of Christian Schools (TRACS), a member of the Association of Independent Colleges and Universities in Massachusetts (AICUM), and approved by the Massachusetts Department of Higher Education.

== Student life ==
=== Campus ===
Boston Baptist College's five-acre campus rests in a quiet suburban residential neighborhood accessible to downtown Boston. The tree-lined campus includes separate housing for men and women, lecture halls, library, dining hall, a gym, Charles River Coffeehouse, and other amenities. Convocation ceremonies are traditionally held in Boston's historic Faneuil Hall.

=== Community ===
Student Government and the Director of Student Life organize activities for students, including community service projects, activities on-campus and off-campus, concerts, intramural sports, and trips into Boston and the surrounding areas. Students take advantage of a number of service opportunities for personal and community growth, such as prayer groups, small groups, or accountability groups, weekly student-led worship events, and book discussions, and also actively serve in a number of churches in the greater Boston area.

=== Global travel ===
One of the highlights of the college curriculum is their annual study tour for academic credit, teaching students on-location in major historical centers like Israel, Turkey, Greece, Italy, and the British Isles.
