= Baptist Bible Fellowship International =

Baptist denomination in the US

- Classification: Protestant
- Orientation: Baptist
- Theology: Fundamentalist Baptist
- Polity: Congregationalist
- President: Jon Haley
- 1st Vice President: John Theisen
- 2nd Vice President: Kevin Carson
- 3rd Vice President: Randy Abell
- Origin: 1950
- Separated from: World Baptist Fellowship
- Congregations: 4,000
- Ministers: 4,340
- Official website: bbfi.org

The Baptist Bible Fellowship International (BBFI) is an international conservative Baptist Christian denomination. It is headquartered in Springfield, Missouri.

== History ==
The Fellowship was founded during a meeting at Fort Worth in 1950 by a group of 100 pastors of the World Baptist Fellowship who disagreed with the authoritative direction of the leader. That same year, the Baptist Bible College (now Mission University) and the organization's headquarters were established in Springfield, Missouri. It has established various fundamentalist Baptist Bible churches around the world. In 2000, it had 4,500 churches and 1,200,000 members. According to a denomination census released in 2025, it has 4,000 churches in the United States and has a presence in 80 countries.

== Programs ==
There are three functions of the Baptist Bible Fellowship International. Worldwide missions, training, and communication.

The Baptist Bible Tribune, published monthly, contains numerous opinion pieces, reports from the foreign mission field, reports from domestic churches, and light theological treatises. It is written by BBFI officers, pastors, and missionaries and is the official voice of the BBFI. Since 2015, the editor is Randy Harp who was preceded by Keith Bassham.

The organizational structure includes the president, vice-presidents, secretary, treasurer, and one director from each state elected by his own state fellowship. Within this organization, there are state fellowships in each of the fifty United States.

== Beliefs ==
The Fellowship has a Baptist confession of faith. Their beliefs are part of the fundamentalist movement.

== See also ==
- Christianity in the United States
