= Urban College of Boston =

Private community college in Massachusetts, U.S.

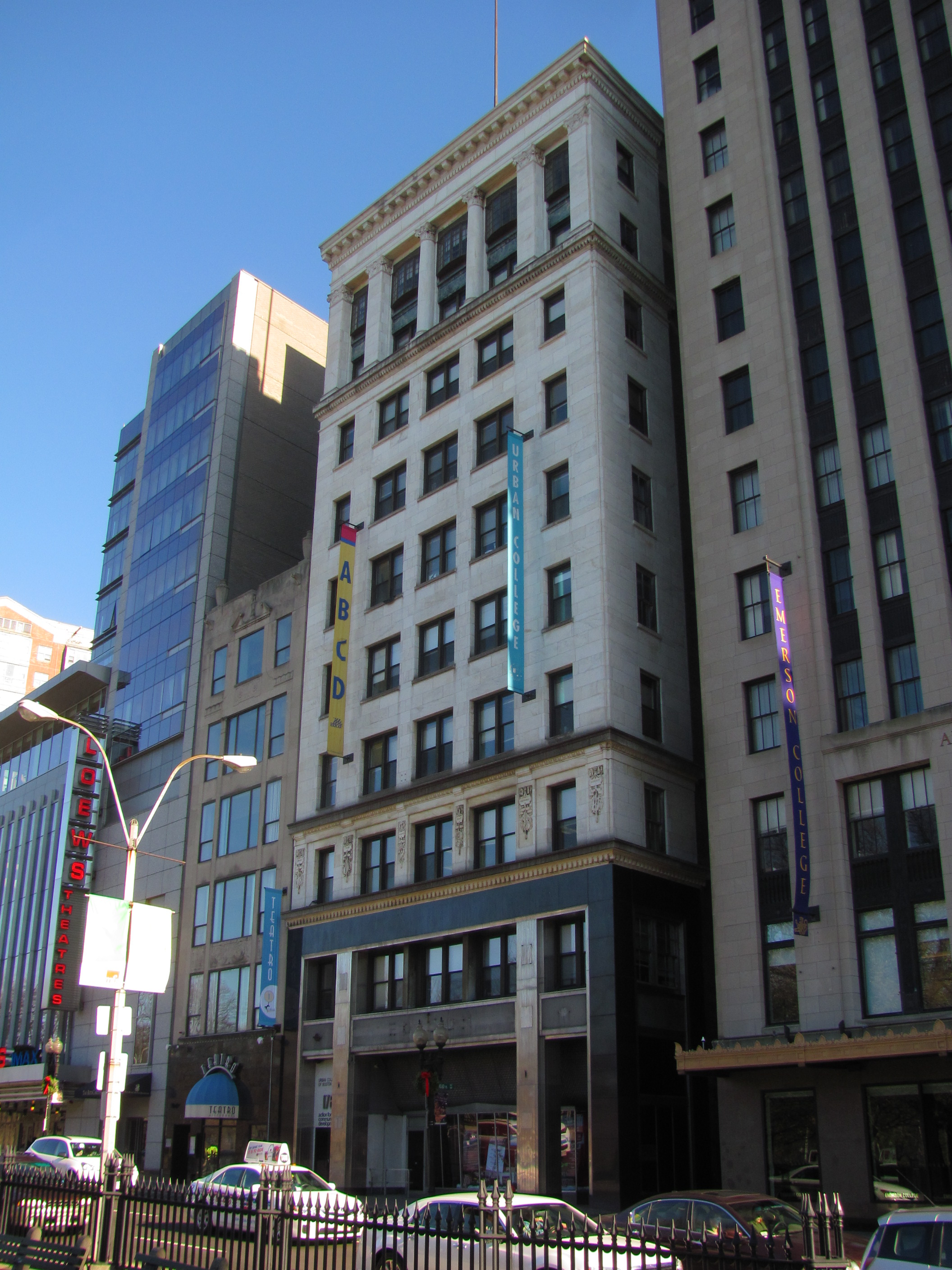
- Urban College of Boston (2011)
- Type: Private community college
- Established: 1993
- President: Yves Salomon-Fernández
- Students: 1,000 (2014)
- Location: Boston, Massachusetts, United States; 42.3529°N 71.0642°W
- Campus: 2 Boylston Street, 2nd Floor Boston, MA 02116
- Website: urbancollege.edu

Urban College of Boston is a private community college in Boston, Massachusetts. The college offers Associate of Arts degrees and certificate programs in 11 other areas.

== History ==
In 1967 Action for Boston Community Development (ABCD) started the Urban College Program to meet the educational, employment and career development needs for adults, in collaboration with major Boston area colleges and universities. The school enabled students to earn academic credits toward undergraduate and graduate school degrees while acquiring job-related skills.

In 1993, the Higher Education Coordinating Council of the Commonwealth of Massachusetts chartered the Urban College of Boston as a private institution authorized to grant Associate of Arts degrees in three areas of study: Early Childhood Education, Human Services Administration and General Studies.

In January 1994, UCB enrolled its first degree candidates, both men and women.

In 1995, UCB was granted Candidacy Status for Accreditation by the New England Association of Schools and Colleges (NEASC).

In 1998, the affiliation with ABCD was re-cast as a partnership when UCB was granted 501(c)(3) status as a tax exempt non-profit organization. In September 2000, it became a fully independent college, while maintaining a partnership with ABCD.

In October 2001, UCB was awarded full accreditation by New England Association of Schools and Colleges.

== Academics ==
UCB was founded as a "non-traditional, multicultural college" to enable students from literacy, GED, adult education, Head Start (parents and staff) and youth programs to enroll in a higher education program.

The college offers college courses, as well as degree and certificate programs in the fields of early childhood education, general studies, human services administration, and computer technology. It has arrangements helping graduates to attend further degree programs at local colleges.

The college is the only educational institution in the City of Boston that offers full course-loads in other languages, which attracts minoritized students seeking to advance their education while continuing English as a Second Language (ESL) studies. In recent years the college has gained recognition for its services in sex education and drivers education for non-drivers since a high number of graduates take advantage of them in order to graduate.

As part of their efforts to reach more traditionally underserved students, Urban College added off-site location programs in suburbs such as Worcester, Lawrence, Fitchburg, and Boston neighborhoods such as Roxbury.

== Finances ==
The school ran into financial trouble in 2011 when the federal government cut $700,000 in annual funding. That same year, the U.S. Department of Education disqualified the school from receiving Pell Grant funding. By 2012, Urban College faced a financial deficit and planned to partner with Endicott College.

Urban College had a $250,000 deficit that the school could not directly fill, resulting in complaints from the NEASC about the college's future financial viability. UCB aggressively took steps to remedy this situation.

The school solved its financial troubles without becoming partners with Endicott College. Urban College continued serving its students while registering new students and has remained financially stable since.

On March 1, 2015, the Federal Department of Education released the names of "most of the hundreds of colleges, (including the Urban College of Boston) whose federal aid it has restricted because of concerns about their finances or compliance with federal requirements."
