= National Christian College Athletic Association =

American Sports governing body

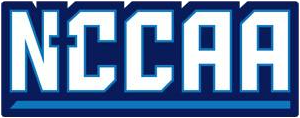
- Abbreviation: NCCAA
- Founded: 1968; 58 years ago
- Legal status: Association
- Headquarters: Greenville, South Carolina, U.S.
- Region served: United States
- Website: thenccaa.org

The National Christian College Athletic Association (NCCAA) is an association of Christian universities, colleges, and Bible colleges in the United States and Canada whose mission is "the promotion and enhancement of intercollegiate athletic competition with a Christian perspective". The national headquarters is located in Greenville, South Carolina. The NCCAA was formed in 1968. For the 2023–24 season, the NCCAA listed 92 members, 53 of which participate in Division I and 39 in Division II. Many teams in the NCCAA are also in other athletic associations, including the NCAA, NAIA, or ACCA.

The association's sports for men are baseball, basketball, cross country, golf, soccer, tennis, and track and field (indoor/outdoor). Women's sports are basketball, cross country, golf, soccer, softball, tennis, track and field (indoor/outdoor), and volleyball. The NCCAA's first women's basketball national championship tournaments were held in 1983. Spring Arbor College won the Division I title, and Baptist Bible College of Pennsylvania claimed the Division II crown. The NCCAA has discontinued men's volleyball, wrestling and football.

== Sports ==
The NCCAA sponsors championships in the following sports:

Sports programs
Sport	Men's	Women's
Baseball	✓	✗
Basketball	✓	✓
Cross Country	✓	✓
Golf	✓	✓
Soccer	✓	✓
Softball	✗	✓
Tennis	✓	✓
Track and field	✓	✓
Volleyball	✓	✓

== See also ==
- List of NCCAA institutions
