= Robert J. McMullen =

American pastor and academic administrator

The Reverend Robert J. McMullen
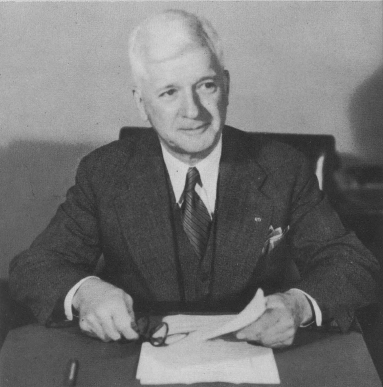
- McMullen c. 1945

15th President of Centre College
- In office September 1, 1944 – October 1, 1946
- Preceded by: Robert L. McLeod
- Succeeded by: Walter A. Groves

Personal details
- Born: May 18, 1884 Blackstock, South Carolina, U.S.
- Died: October 26, 1962 (aged 78) High Point, North Carolina, U.S.
- Resting place: Chapel Hill Memorial Cemetery; Chapel Hill, North Carolina, U.S.
- Spouse: Emma Moffett (m. 1910)
- Education: Central University of Kentucky; Louisville Presbyterian Theological Seminary; Southern Baptist Theological Seminary; Columbia University; Princeton University

Robert Johnston McMullen (May 18, 1884 – October 26, 1962) was an American pastor, missionary, and academic administrator. A graduate of Central University of Kentucky, now Centre College, and Louisville Presbyterian Theological Seminary, he was licensed to preach in April 1909 and soon left the country to begin a period of more than thirty years in Hangzhou, China. He worked as a Presbyterian missionary from 1911 to 1932 before joining the faculty of Hangchow Christian College and eventually becoming the school's president for four years. After a seven-month detainment in a Japanese prison camp, McMullen returned to the United States in 1943 and was elected president of his alma mater the next year. He began in the role in September 1944 as "co-president" alongside Robert L. McLeod, who had been away since December 1942 as a chaplain in the United States Navy. The war having concluded, both McLeod and McMullen resigned in November 1945, though McMullen stayed at Centre as its lone president until October 1946. After leaving Danville, he worked for the United Board for Christian Colleges in China before his 1953 retirement.

== Early life and education ==
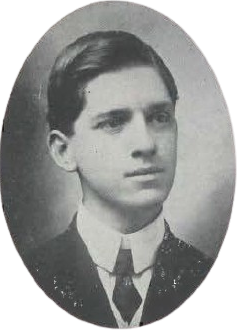
McMullen as a senior at Central in 1905

Robert Johnston McMullen was born on May 18, 1884, in Blackstock, South Carolina, (Note: Blackstock is sometimes erroneously referred to as "Blackstone" by sources.) to Henrietta Johnston and John Calvin McMullen. McMullen attended Central University of Kentucky, now known as Centre College, in Danville, Kentucky, and graduated in 1905. At Central, he was a member of the Delta Kappa Epsilon fraternity and was president of the YMCA and the Chamberlain literary society. After a one-year stint as an assistant principal at Stanford High School in Stanford, Kentucky, he graduated with a Bachelor of Divinity degree from Louisville Presbyterian Theological Seminary in 1909 and later earned a Ph.D. from the Southern Baptist Theological Seminary and two degrees, a Master of Arts and a Doctor of Education, from Columbia University. He was also a graduate of Princeton University. He was licensed to preach by the West Lexington Presbytery on April 7, 1909.

== Career ==
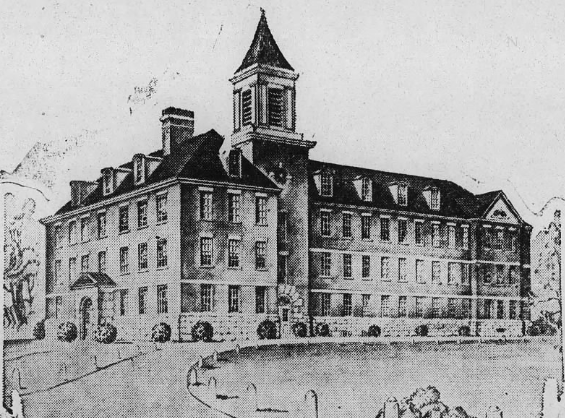
An architect's depiction of the result of Breckinridge Hall's renovation, drawn in May 1946

The year after getting married, McMullen and his wife left for mission work for the Presbyterian Church in the United States (commonly the "Southern Presbyterian Church") in the Chinese city of Hangzhou. While in China, he was awarded an honorary Doctor of Divinity degree by Centre. After his work as a missionary ended in 1932, he joined the faculty at Hangchow Christian College. He became the school's president in 1938 and held the position until 1942. During various times, he was also the school's provost and comptroller. After spending seven months in a Japanese prison camp during that country's occupation of China, he returned to the United States in December 1943 aboard MS Gripsholm. He later gave several addresses about China and his time there, including one shortly after his return and several more in January and March 1945.

McMullen was elected president of Centre College in June 1944, filling a vacancy created two years prior when President Robert L. McLeod obtained a leave of absence in December 1942 to serve in the United States Navy as a chaplain. The need for a co-president was said to be that those at the college desired an "active official at the school", in the words of the chairman of the board of trustees. James H. Hewlitt had taken the role of acting president at the time and held it until McMullen's arrival, at which time he returned to his position as dean and a professor of English. McMullen arrived in Danville on August 24, 1944, and began his term as president of Centre College on September 1, holding the position along with McLeod. He was not formally inaugurated until May 26, 1945. Despite his title as co-president, his position involved the full duties of the office. During his short presidency, renovations began on Breckinridge Hall, a campus dormitory building, as well as on several buildings on Centre's women's campus. He also began hiring more faculty in anticipation of a post-war enrollment boom; this plan was continued by his successor, Walter A. Groves. After the conclusion of the 1944–1945 academic year, eight Centre faculty members pursued further studies at various universities. During his presidency, he delivered commencement addresses at Danville High School, Nicholasville High School, and what is now Western Kentucky University.

McMullen submitted his resignation on November 9, 1945, to take effect on October 1, 1946. McLeod resigned five days later, effective immediately, leaving McMullen to lead the school as its sole president for the following eleven months. After leaving office, Centre awarded him another honorary degree. In September 1946, McMullen announced that Centre had received a gift of $50,000 (equivalent to $826,000 in 2025) from James Clark McReynolds, who had recently died.

After leaving Centre, McMullen went to New York to be the executive secretary of the United Board for Christian Colleges in China, where he worked until 1952. He was the pastor of First Presbyterian Church in Chapel Hill, North Carolina, for a short time in 1953 before he retired that same year.

== Personal life and death ==
McMullen married Emma Moffett on June 8, 1910, in Lebanon, Kentucky. He died on October 26, 1962, aged 78, in High Point, North Carolina.
