= Boyce College =

Christian college in Kentucky, U.S.

Coordinates: 38°14′51.2″N 85°41′10.2″W

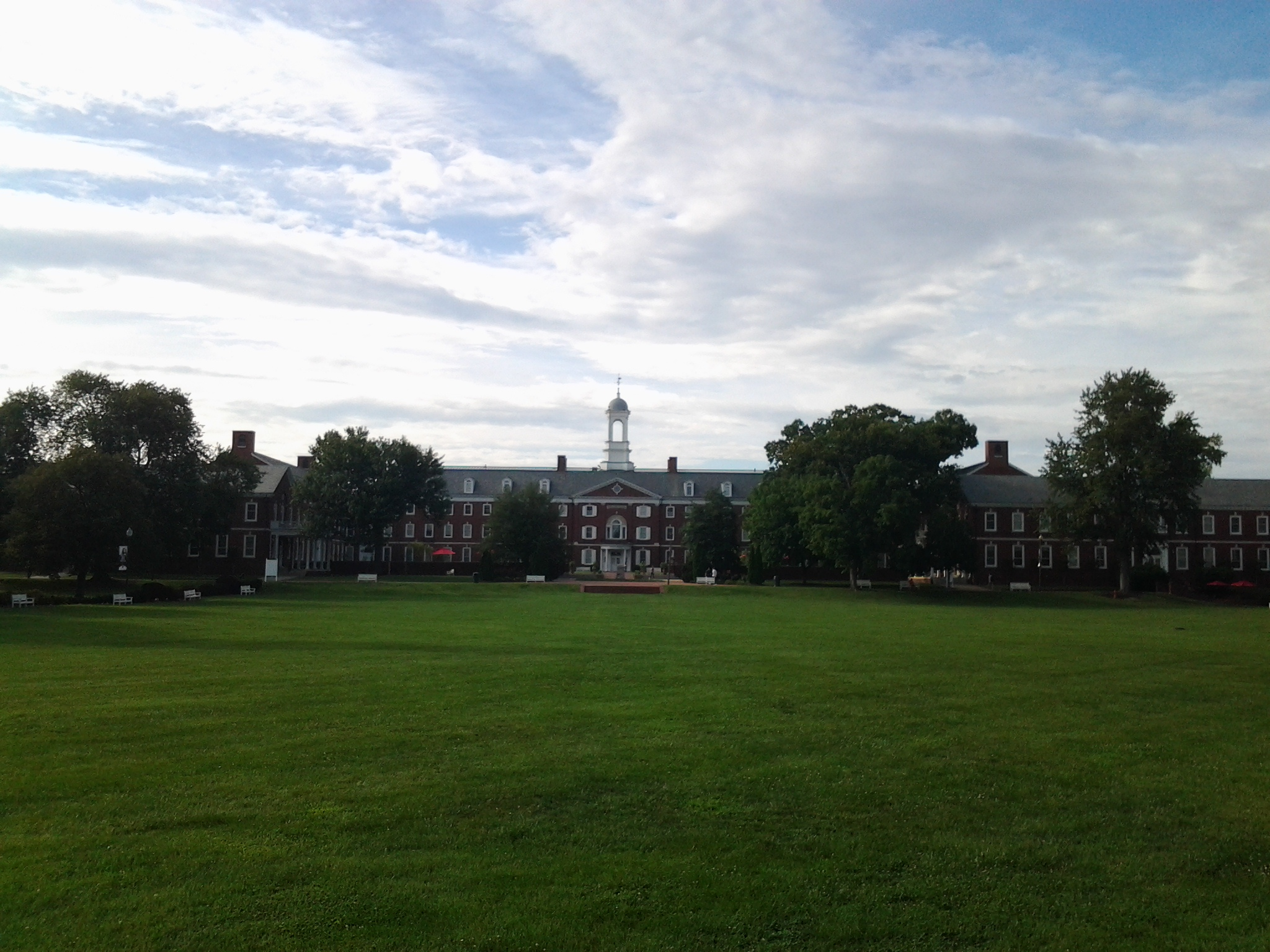
- Motto: That the Man of God May Be Perfect, Throughly Furnished Unto All Good Works
- Type: Private college
- Established: 1998
- Religious affiliation: Southern Baptist Convention
- Academic affiliations: Kentuckiana Metroversity Southern Baptist Theological Seminary
- President: R. Albert Mohler Jr.
- Dean: Dustin Bruce
- Faculty: 18
- Students: 1,235
- Location: Louisville, Kentucky, U.S.
- Campus: Suburban, 100 acres (40 ha)
- Colors: Red, black, gray
- Nickname: Bulldogs
- Sporting affiliations: NCCAA Division II Mid-East
- Website: www.boycecollege.com

Boyce College is a private Christian college in Louisville, Kentucky. It is affiliated with the Southern Baptist Theological Seminary. It is accredited by the Southern Association of Colleges and Schools and the Association of Theological Schools in the United States and Canada.

== History ==
Boyce College is the successor of Boyce Bible School, which was formed in 1974 and offered an associate of arts degree. It is named for James Petigru Boyce, the first president of Southern Seminary. In 1998, under the guidance of the seminary's ninth president, Albert Mohler, Boyce Bible School became Boyce College and began offering six bachelor's degrees in addition to the associate degree. While offering seven different ministry-related degree programs, Boyce College's enrollment has grown over 700% in the ensuing years.

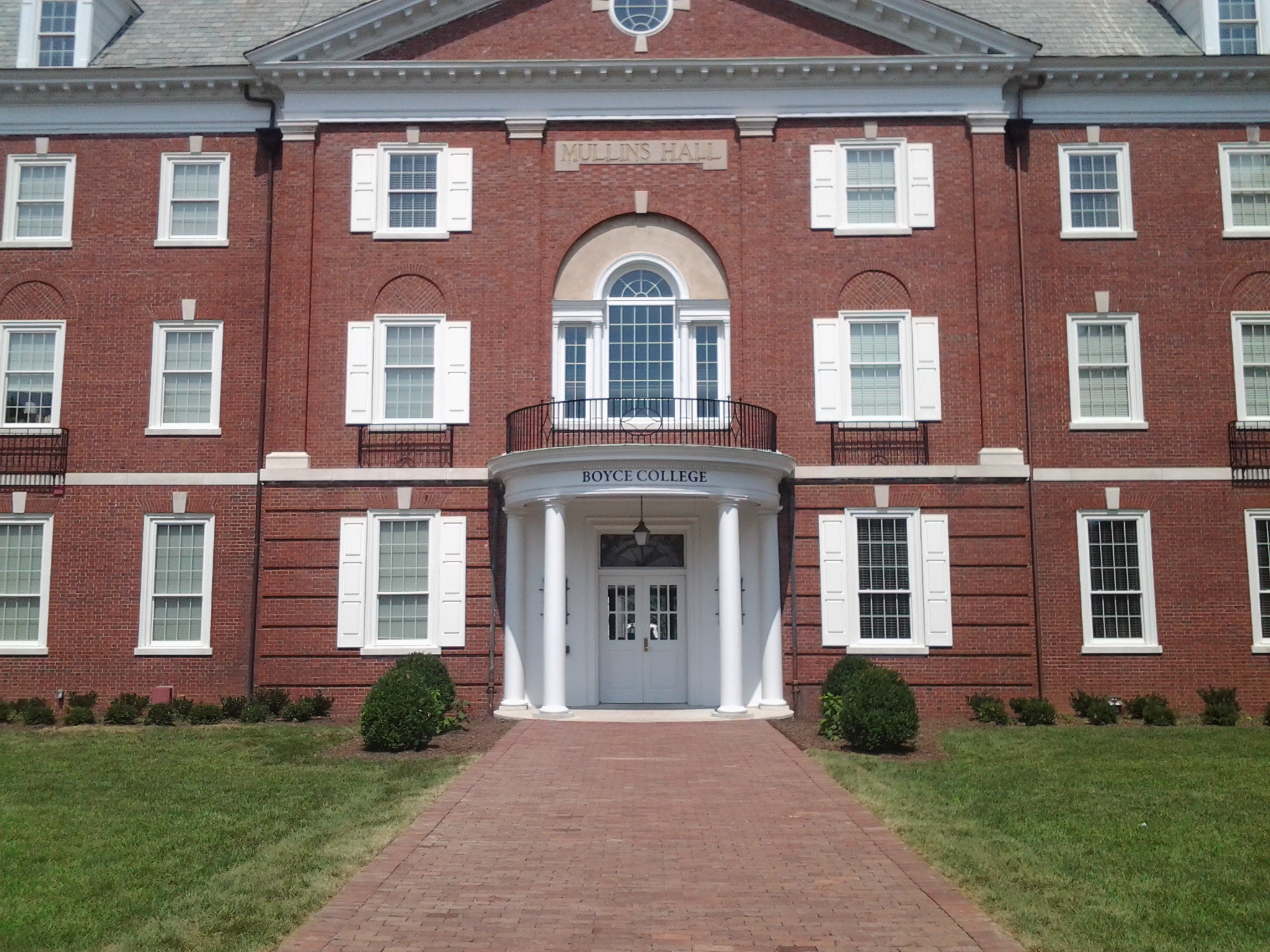
Main entrance to Mullins Hall at Boyce College

Boyce College was originally housed in W.O. Carver Hall, but was moved into the newly renovated Mullins Complex in August 2014. The renovation of Mullins includes 86 suite-style dormitories with 350 beds, 17 faculty offices, and Sampey Commons (a gathering area that includes a rock climbing wall, two kitchens, a recording studio, and an entertainment lounge). Boyce College continues to share classrooms with Southern Seminary in W.O. Carver Hall, Rankin Hall, and Norton Hall. It also shares the Honeycutt Campus Center and the James P. Boyce Centennial Library with the seminary community.

== Accreditation ==
The college is accredited by Southern Association of Colleges and Schools and the Association of Theological Schools in the United States and Canada. It is also affiliated with the Southern Baptist Theological Seminary (Southern Baptist Convention).

== Athletics ==
Boyce College has five sports teams which all compete in the NCCAA Division II – Mid-East Region.

Boyce added its first sports team, a men's basketball team, in 2007. In the 2013–14 season, the team placed third in the Region. Notable basketball players include Ben Akers, who received the 2016 Pete Maravich Award.

In 2015, Boyce added a men's soccer team. In 2021, Boyce Soccer won their first NCCAA Mideast regional championship in school history. In the 2023 season, Boyce Soccer reached the NCCAA Championship game, losing by a score of 1–2 to Pensacola Christian College.

In 2016, Boyce added a women's volleyball team.

In 2022, Boyce added a men's and women's cross country team. In the 2023 season, senior Danielle Ruhr won the Dr. Ray Bullock Award.

== Augustine Honors Collegium ==
In 2016, Boyce College started the Augustine Honors Collegium, a seminar-based program for academically advanced undergraduates interested in Christian scholarship. The Collegium formerly published a biannual academic journal, The Augustine Collegiate Review.

== Notable alumni ==
- FLAME, hip hop recording artist
- Trip Lee, hip hop recording artist and author
