= Walter A. Groves =

American missionary, minister, educator, and academic administrator

The Reverend Walter A. Groves
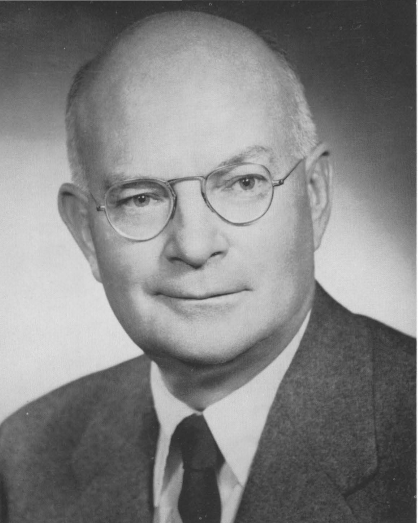
- Groves, c. 1957

16th President of Centre College
- In office January 1, 1947 – August 31, 1957
- Preceded by: Robert J. McMullen
- Succeeded by: Thomas A. Spragens

Personal details
- Born: March 10, 1898 Germantown, Philadelphia, Pennsylvania, U.S.
- Died: September 22, 1983 (aged 85) Albany, Georgia, U.S.
- Resting place: Crown Hill Cemetery; Albany, Georgia, U.S.
- Spouse: Estelle Crawford (m. 1925)
- Children: 4
- Education: Lafayette College (B.A.); Princeton Theological Seminary (Note: Some sources list Groves as holding a Master of Arts degree from Princeton, but in an interview Groves gave he stated "I came back [from Turkey] at the first of the year and reentered the Seminary and concluded my studies there, though I still lacked one course, which means I never really received any degree from Princeton Theological Seminary."); University of Pennsylvania (Ph.D.)
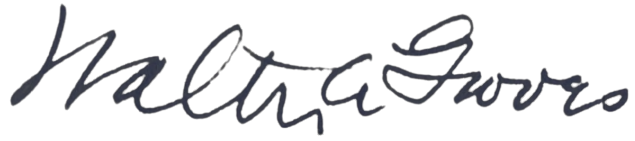
- Signature

Military service
- Branch/service: United States Army
- Rank: Second lieutenant
- Battles/wars: World War I

Walter Alexander Groves (March 10, 1898 – September 22, 1983) was an American missionary, minister, educator, and academic administrator who was the 16th president of Centre College in Danville, Kentucky. He was born in Philadelphia and graduated from Central High School before enrolling at Lafayette College in Easton, Pennsylvania. He spent three years there before leaving to enlist in the army during World War I. After the war's conclusion, he returned to Lafayette and graduated in July 1919. He spent the following three years studying at Princeton Theological Seminary but came one class shy of meeting the requirements for his degree. He returned to Lafayette to teach in 1922 and was ordained as a minister the following year; in 1925, he left the United States for missionary work in Tehran and spent the majority of the next fifteen years there.

Groves and his family left Iran in July 1940, shortly before the Anglo-Soviet invasion of the country. While on the ship home, he received a telegram from Centre College president Robert L. McLeod offering him a job as professor of philosophy and religion. Groves accepted and taught his first class at Centre in October 1940, the morning after arriving on campus for the first time. After teaching at Centre for two years, Groves became professor of theology at Louisville Presbyterian Theological Seminary and spent four and a half years there before returning to Centre as its president in January 1947. During his ten-year term in charge of the school, Groves managed personnel issues with the faculty and students; he started a campaign to encourage professors to pursue doctoral degrees.

Groves strengthened Centre's ties to the Presbyterian Church; he held the church's pro-desegregation views and wished for those views to be adopted by the college. Disagreements with the board of trustees on this issue ultimately led to his resignation effective August 1957. He returned to Iran shortly after and spent time in administration at the Abadan Institute of Technology and Pahlavi University before returning to the United States to retire. He went back to Iran a final time in 1966 to preach; while there, he helped to found Damavand College. He died in Albany, Georgia, in 1983.

== Early life and education ==
Groves was born on March 10, 1898, in Germantown, Philadelphia, Pennsylvania. Both of his parents were immigrants from the British Isles: his mother, Ellen, was born in England and immigrated in 1885, and his father, Robert, was born in County Down, Ireland, and immigrated in 1883. Groves was the oldest of six children in his family; he had five younger sisters, two of whom died in infancy. He graduated from Central High School in 1915. He completed three years of schooling at Lafayette College, in Easton, Pennsylvania, before leaving to enlist in the army during World War I. He was sent to training in Plattsburg, New York, and had spent three months there before the Selective Service Act of 1917 was expanded to include men 18 years and older, after which he took up training at Camp Taylor in Louisville, Kentucky. He was commissioned as a second lieutenant and served until the armistice was signed on November 11, 1918. He returned to Lafayette in January 1919 and graduated magna cum laude with a Bachelor of Arts degree in July of that year. While at Lafayette, he was a member of Sigma Alpha Epsilon, Phi Beta Kappa, and the cross country team, and was captain of the track team.

Groves enrolled at Princeton Theological Seminary in September 1919 and completed his studies there in 1922, though he did not receive a degree because he lacked one necessary course. He went on to earn a Ph.D. from the University of Pennsylvania in 1925.

== Early career and missionary work ==
Groves began his professional career when he joined the faculty of his alma mater, Lafayette, as a professor of history and the Bible in 1922; he spent two academic years in this position. In 1923, the Presbytery of Philadelphia ordained him as a minister, and from 1924 to 1925 he was the secretary of the Presbyterian Church in the United States of America (PCUSA) Board of Foreign Missions.

Very shortly after Groves was married to Estelle Crawford, on March 10, 1925, the couple left for missionary work at the American School of Tehran (now Alborz Mandegar High School) in Tehran. At the time, it was led by Lafayette alumnus Samuel Martin Jordan as a part of the "Lafayette in Persia" program. Groves gained more responsibilities in addition to his teaching as his 15-year stint at the school progressed: from 1925 to 1931 he was the registrar, and he left that position to become dean. The family left Iran only twice—on furlough in 1930 and 1938–1939 when they returned to the United States—during this span. They left for good in July 1940, shortly before the invasion of Iran and the abdication of Reza Shah. Due to the conflict, they were forced to leave on a ship sailing out of Bombay, which they did on July 24, and they arrived in the United States after 39 days.

== Academia and administration ==
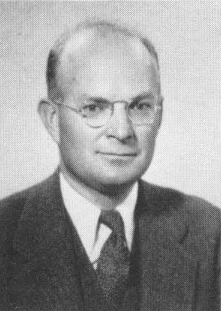
Groves's faculty photograph as shown in the 1941 Centre yearbook

Around the time of his departure from Iran, Groves received a telegram from Robert L. McLeod, the president of Centre College in Danville, Kentucky, inquiring if Groves wanted to join the school's faculty; Groves later said his only prior knowledge of Centre came from two classmates of his at Princeton and from former Berea College president William James Hutchins, who was on the ship home with them. McLeod met Groves in New York upon the ship's arrival and Groves and his wife arrived in Danville less than a week later, in early October 1940. Groves became professor of philosophy and religion and taught his first class at Centre on his first morning in town. Groves held this post from 1940 to 1942 before taking a position as professor of theology at Louisville Presbyterian Theological Seminary, which he held until 1946. In 1944, he was awarded the Iranian Scientific Medal of the First Degree for his "services to education in Iran", and Lafayette awarded him an honorary Doctor of Divinity degree in 1946.

After four and a half years in Louisville, Groves was offered Centre's presidency, which he accepted. He moved back to Danville in December 1946 and began as Centre's sixteenth president on January 1, 1947; as of 2026, he is the last minister to lead the school. He was formally inaugurated on November 15, 1947. Two years after taking office, he was invited to a reception for Reza Shah in Washington, D.C., but was unable to attend. One event that Groves had to address soon after taking office was a boom in enrollment due in part to the G.I. Bill at the conclusion of World War II; that and faculty personnel adjustments became a theme of his early tenure as president. Due to financial constraints he was forced to make a round of layoffs among the faculty, though later on he was able to make hires and began encouraging faculty members to get their doctoral degrees; he also increased faculty salaries by 60% over the course of his term. The increased student enrollment prompted changes such as the creation of a student congress and a dean of students, and tuition and fees increased to $500 (equivalent to $6,200 in 2025) in 1951. In 1957, Centre adjusted its admissions policies when it began using the Scholastic Aptitude Test, now the SAT, when considering applicants. In a 1983 interview, he said that construction of the Memorial Gymnasium was the major fundraising effort of his presidency; he also mentioned the Weisiger Building, a fine arts building which was constructed on the campus of the Kentucky College for Women—at the time, Centre's women's campus—and funded through a willed donation of $150,000 (equivalent to $1.8 million in 2025) by the benefactor Emma Weisiger. He was also able to help the school's financials by securing grants from the F. W. Olin Foundation and the Ford Foundation. Early in his presidency, he had a goal of consolidating the women's campus onto the main men's campus; upon raising the matter with the board of trustees, he received such a negative reaction that he did not raise it again for the duration of his term. A lack of desire for consolidation on the part of the women's college students further ensured such plans would not be acted upon, though this merger eventually took place in 1962 under the direction of Groves's successor, Thomas A. Spragens.

Centre maintained its ties to the Presbyterian Church during Groves's tenure; at the time, all alumni trustees were elected by the alumni association and approved by either the PCUSA (commonly referred to as the "Northern Presbyterian Church") or the Presbyterian Church in the United States (the "Southern Presbyterian Church"), though no trustee was ever turned away by either body. He later stated that his desire was for Centre to maintain its status as a Christian liberal arts college, in contrast to a "fundamentalist Christian college" or a "Bible college". Both church synods held similar views to Groves with respect to desegregation and the college's admissions policies regarding non-White students, one of the biggest issues of the later part of his term.

A special meeting of the Centre board of trustees was called on April 13, 1957, for the purpose of receiving Groves's letter of resignation, which was officially dated and submitted on April 15. The board unanimously accepted the resignation and requested that he stay on until after commencement; he agreed, and his resignation was set to be effective August 31, 1957. W. B. Guerrant, a Centre alumnus and the former president of Austin College, was elected acting president on June 1 of that year. Spragens attended the next board meeting, on July 19, and on that occasion was offered the presidency, which he later accepted.

After leaving Centre, Groves began a stint as president of the Abadan Institute of Technology (now the Petroleum University of Technology) in Abadan, Iran, and he went to Shiraz in 1961 to become provost and vice chancellor of Pahlavi University (now Shiraz University). He retired to Albany, Georgia, in 1964 and was retired by the Presbytery of Philadelphia the following year. Groves came out of retirement two years later to move back to Iran, where he was pastor of the Presbyterian Church in Abadan for a year and a half. During his time there, he also helped to found Damavand College, a private women's college, in Tehran. Upon his return to Georgia, he was named pastor emeritus at Covenant Presbyterian Church in Albany. Several months before his death, Groves attended the inauguration of Centre president Richard L. Morrill in Danville.

== Personal life and death ==
Groves became engaged to Estelle Crawford in June 1924, and they married on February 28, 1925. They had four children, three of whom were born in Iran and one in the United States.

Groves died at 7:02 a.m. on September 22, 1983, at Phoebe Putney Memorial Hospital in Albany.

== Notes ==
Academic offices
Preceded by Robert J. McMullen	President of Centre College; 1947–1957	Succeeded by W. B. Guerrant as Acting President; Thomas A. Spragens as President
