= Robert L. McLeod =

American pastor and academic administrator

The Reverend Robert L. McLeod
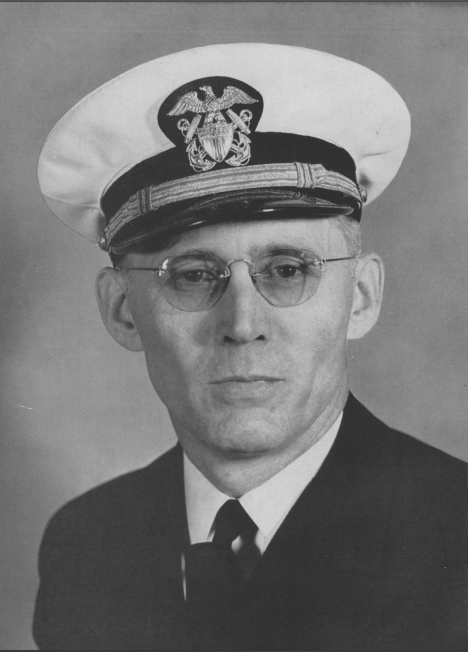
- McLeod c. 1943

14th President of Centre College
- In office October 5, 1938 – November 14, 1945
- Preceded by: Charles J. Turck
- Succeeded by: Robert J. McMullen

Personal details
- Born: January 28, 1901 Cheraw, South Carolina, U.S.
- Died: August 30, 1998 (aged 97) Winter Haven, Florida, U.S.
- Resting place: Oak Grove Cemetery; Maxton, North Carolina, U.S.
- Spouse(s): Ruth John (m. 1926; died 1990) Ann McNeer (m. 1990)
- Education: Davidson College; Louisville Presbyterian Theological Seminary

Military service
- Allegiance: United States
- Branch/service: United States Navy
- Years of service: 1942–1945
- Rank: Chaplain

Robert Lee McLeod Jr. (January 28, 1901 – August 30, 1998) was an American pastor and academic administrator.

Following his graduation from Louisville Presbyterian Theological Seminary, McLeod took preaching positions in Mississippi and Florida before spending two years working at the Presbyterian Church headquarters in New York. He was elected president of Centre College in Danville, Kentucky, in 1938 and took office in October of that year. After four years in the position, he was granted a leave of absence from Centre to serve in the United States Navy as a chaplain; in this job he spent two years as the theological director of the V-12 Program and one year aboard the USS Antietam, all while maintaining his title of president. During his absence, Centre hired Robert J. McMullen to be "co-president" alongside McLeod, living on campus and holding the full responsibilities of the position. McLeod resigned following the end of World War II and spent time preaching in Missouri, Florida, Tennessee, and Louisiana, before retiring in 1981.

== Early life and education ==
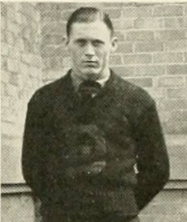
McLeod as a cheerleader at Davidson, c. 1923

Robert Lee McLeod Jr. was born on January 28, 1901, in Cheraw, South Carolina, to Margaret McIver and Robert McLeod Sr. Both Robert Sr. and Robert Jr. were named for Robert E. Lee, on whose staff Robert Sr.'s father worked. Robert Jr. was one of eleven children and was raised in Maxton, North Carolina. He matriculated at Davidson College in 1918, where he was a cheerleader and a member of the Pi Kappa Alpha fraternity, and graduated in 1923. He then attended Louisville Presbyterian Theological Seminary. Following his time in Louisville he studied at the University of Edinburgh from 1923 to 1924. After his return to the United States, he spent time at Princeton Theological Seminary and Union Theological Seminary.

== Career ==
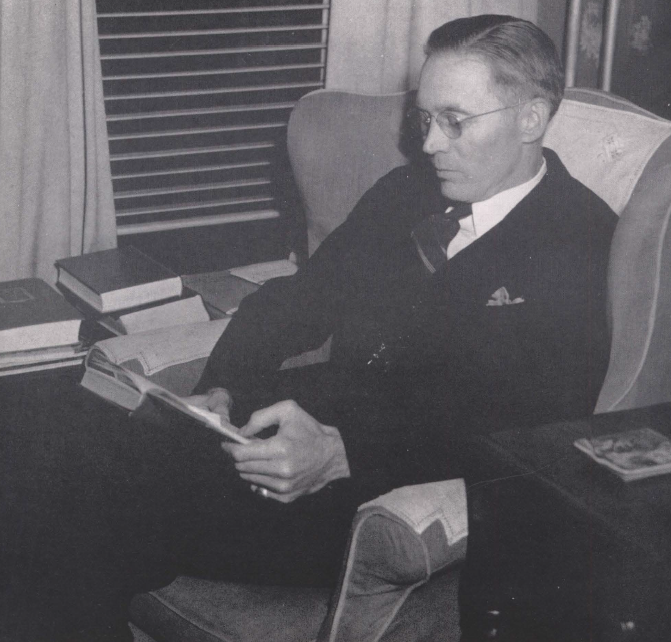
McLeod c. 1942 as Centre College president, seated in his office

McLeod began his career as the pastor of the First Presbyterian Church in Grenada, Mississippi, after which he preached in Winter Haven, Florida, before moving to New York City to work as the secretary to the Board of National Missions at the Presbyterian Church in the United States of America (PCUSA) headquarters for two years. In that job, he worked closely with Charles J. Turck, who had left office as president of Centre College in 1936 and was working for the PCUSA's Board of Christian Education in Philadelphia at the time. McLeod was recommended to fill Centre's vacancy by a Lexington pastor and the president of Louisville Seminary; upon hearing that McLeod was being considered, Turck discussed the job with him and praised the school.

McLeod took office as Centre's 14th president on October 5, 1938, though he was not formally inaugurated until January 20, 1939. He was the school's first president to be born in the twentieth century. Whereas many of Centre's previous presidents had lived in Hillcrest House during their time in office, McLeod and his family were the first to live in Craik House, which had been purchased by the college in 1937.

Several months after he began his term as president, the college was gifted $480,000 (equivalent to $11.1 million in 2025) in unrestricted funds after the death of Guy Wiseman, a trustee and member of Centre's class of 1885. The funds were put to use increasing faculty salaries and building new dormitory buildings, and he began a $1.4 million fundraising effort during his term in order to further improve the campus. He received an annual salary of $6,000 (equivalent to $137,000 in 2025) as president. In July 1940, he hired Walter A. Groves, who went on to become Centre's sixteenth president in 1947, as a professor of philosophy and religion. Groves, returning to the country from mission work in Tehran, received a telegram from McLeod with the job offer and McLeod met Groves when his ship arrived in Boston some weeks later.

In December 1942, McLeod requested and was granted a leave of absence from Centre in order to serve in the United States Navy Chaplain Corps. Upon his departure, he offered his resignation as president but the board of trustees urged him to keep the position. During the 1942–1943 academic year, McLeod was one of four college faculty members on leave with the armed forces. The other three members were a professor of German, a professor of biology and mathematics, and a physical education professor who was also the head coach of the football team. James Hewlitt, dean of the college, became acting president upon his departure and held the position until September 1944, when the school hired Robert J. McMullen, a Centre alumnus, to be co-president alongside McLeod, based in Danville and with the full responsibilities of the office.

McLeod's first two years in the Navy were spent in Washington, D.C., as director of the theological portion of the V-12 Program, after which he spent a year aboard the aircraft carrier USS Antietam in the Pacific. After the end of World War II, McLeod resigned on November 14, 1945, five days after McMullen submitted his resignation. While McLeod's was effective immediately, McMullen remained at Centre until October 1946.

After leaving Centre, McLeod went to preach in St. Joseph, Missouri, where he stayed for four years. He decided to return to Florida after suffering a heart attack before going back to Missouri five years later to join the faculty at Lindenwood College as a professor of religion. He spent eighteen months working for the Pi Kappa Alpha national office, where he helped bring reforms to the fraternity's rules and ceremonies. Following his resignation from the fraternity position, he went to Memphis, Tennessee, and later New Orleans, to help ministers of churches in each city: in Memphis, he was associate minister of a church for five years, and in New Orleans, he spent two years at a church whose minister had recently had a heart attack. He left New Orleans upon his retirement in 1967.

A short time later, the church in Winter Haven at which McLeod had worked earlier in his career offered him a part-time position as a minister of visitation and counseling, which he accepted. He spent much of the next fourteen years working in Winter Haven and permanently retired in 1981.

== Personal life and death ==
McLeod married Ruth John on December 30, 1926, in Scotland County, North Carolina. He died in Winter Haven, Florida, on August 30, 1998. University of Georgia president Michael F. Adams, who was president of Centre from 1988 to 1997, gave the eulogy at his funeral.
