= Robert Sutherland Alley =

American Professor and author

Dr. Robert Sutherland Alley
- Born: 5 January 1932; Richmond, Virginia, United States
- Died: 14 August 2006 (aged 74); Henrico County, Virginia, United States
- Education: BA University of Richmond; B.D. Southern Baptist Theological Seminary; MA Princeton University; PhD Princeton University
- Occupations: professor, Author

Robert Sutherland Alley was an American author and university professor of religion, he worked at the University of Richmond. He later went on to be the head of the schools Religion Department. He published and worked on many books in that time including:

- Revolt Against the Faithful; A Biblical Case for Inspiration as Encounter (1970)
- The Producer's Medium: Conversations with Creators of American TV (1983)
- James Madison on Religious Liberty (1985)
- The Supreme Court on Church and State (1988)
- Love Is All Around: The Making of the Mary Tyler Moore Show (1989)
- Murphy Brown: Anatomy of a Sitcom (1990)
- School Prayer (1994)
- Without a Prayer (1996)
- Women Television Producers (2002)

Robert Sutherland Alley was born in 1932 to Dr. Reuben Edward Alley and Mary Sutherland in Richmond, Virginia.

He died on August 14, 2006 in Henrico County, Virginia.
