= Stephen J. Wellum =

- Occupation: Professor of Christian Theology at the Southern Baptist Theological Seminary

Academic background
- Education: Roberts Wesleyan College; Trinity Evangelical Divinity School

Academic work
- School or tradition: Evangelicalism, Reformed Theology, Covenant Theology
- Institutions: Southern Baptist Theological Seminary

Stephen J. Wellum is an American Baptist theologian. He is professor of Christian theology at Southern Baptist Theological Seminary and editor of the Southern Baptist Journal of Theology.

Wellum has degrees from Roberts Wesleyan College and Trinity Evangelical Divinity School. He has written numerous academic articles and contributed to books on various aspects of theology. His best known works, however, have dealt with covenant theology and issues of Christology. In the former field, he wrote the systematic theology sections in Kingdom through Covenant: A Biblical–Theological Understanding of the Covenants, and in the latter he has written the Christology volume for the Five Solas and the Foundations of Evangelical Theology series. In Kingdom through Covenant, he originally labeled his and coauthor Peter J. Gentry's position Progressive Covenantalism, calling it a subset of so-called New Covenant theology. Due to the theological claims among some in New Covenant Theology, particularly regarding a covenant at creation with Adam and the active obedience of Christ, Wellum decided to disconnect the movements in his latter work of collected essays titled, Progressive Covenantalism: Charting a Course Between Dispensational and Covenantal Theologies and in the revision of Kingdom through Covenant. The various scholars who wrote for the book Progressive Covenantalism demonstrated just how widespread the movement had become and how connected it was to evangelical academies. This was a substantial difference from New Covenant Theology, which had largely been associated with local pastors.

In his works on Christology, Wellum works through the doctrine of the Person of Christ in God the Son Incarnate, which was his work for the Foundations in Evangelical Theology series, and the doctrine of the Work of Christ in Christ Alone: The Uniqueness of Jesus as Savior, his work for the Five Solas Series edited by Matthew Barrett. In both works, Wellum aims to reaffirm classic doctrines of Christianity. The former, God the Son Incarnate, aims to reaffirm Chalcedonian Christology in the modern age, while the latter aims to reaffirm the classic Protestant, and particularly Reformed, doctrine of the work of Christ. Wellum has also co-authored a lay-level biblical-theological account of Christology with Trent Hunter titled, Christ from Beginning to End: How the Full Story of Scripture Reveals the Full Glory of Christ.
