= Duke Kimbrough McCall =

Duke Kimbrough McCall (September 1, 1914 – April 2, 2013) was an American Christian religious leader whowas Chief Executive Officer of the Southern Baptist Convention (SBC), president of two theological seminaries, president of the Baptist World Alliance, and a Baptist pastor.

== Childhood, college and marriage ==
Born in Meridian, Mississippi, McCall grew up in Memphis, Tennessee, one of five children of John W. McCall, an attorney and judge, and Lizette Kimbrough McCall, a leader in Southern Baptist mission support.

McCall attended Furman University, Greenville, South Carolina, from which he graduated summa cum laude as valedictorian in 1935.

While attending Furman, McCall met Greenville resident Marguerite Mullinnix. The couple married shortly after McCall's graduation and raised four sons: Duke Jr. and Douglas McCall (twins), John Richard McCall, and Michael McCall.

Following his first wife's death in 1983, McCall married Winona Gatton McCandless, the widow of Louisville telephone company executive Paul McCandless.

== Early career ==
After deciding to pursue ministry instead of law, McCall declined his acceptance from Vanderbilt Law School to enroll at the Southern Baptist Theological Seminary in Louisville, Kentucky, earning the Th.M. degree in 1938 while a fellow to the seminary's president, John R. Sampey. McCall then earned a Ph.D. from the seminary in 1942. While completing his Ph.D., he was pastor of a small Baptist church in Woodville, Tennessee.

McCall's first full-time pastorate, during the early years of World War II, was at Broadway Baptist Church, a prominent congregation in downtown Louisville.

In 1943, McCall was elected president of the Baptist Bible Institute of New Orleans, Louisiana, which less than three years later became New Orleans Baptist Theological Seminary.

== Denominational leadership ==
In 1946, McCall became Executive Secretary-Treasurer of the SBC Executive Committee, the Southern Baptist Convention's central coordinating body. During his tenure the SBC became the largest Protestant faith group in the United States.

== Presidency of the Southern Baptist Theological Seminary ==
McCall's tenure as president of the Southern Baptist Theological Seminary was from 1951 to 1982. During that time the seminary's student body grew from 800 to more than 2,000 students, ranking as the second largest of the 200 accredited theological schools in the United States. The school celebrated its centennial year in 1959, during McCall's presidency.

Soon after becoming president, McCall integrated the seminary's classrooms in defiance of Kentucky's segregationist state law. Later, at the height of the civil rights movement, McCall invited Martin Luther King Jr. to speak on campus, making Southern the only SBC institution to host the Baptist civil rights leader.

McCall completed three capital campaigns, one of them funding the construction of the James P. Boyce Centennial Library; another endowing the Billy Graham Chair of Evangelism; and a third that, at more than $10 million, was at the time the largest financial campaign in American theological education.

In 1953 McCall organized Southern into three graduate schools—theology, Christian education, and church music. In 1984, a school of church social work was added, and became the first seminary-based school of social work accredited by the Council on Social Work Education. He also led the seminary to launch Boyce Bible School (now called Boyce College), an adult education division for students without college prerequisites.

== Writing and television ==
McCall wrote several books, including What is the Church?, God's Hurry, and A Story of Stewardship. For 30 years he wrote a monthly opinion column, Thinking Aloud. In the early 1960s he helped inaugurate a weekly interfaith dialogue, Moral Side of the News, on Louisville's WHAS-TV in which Protestant, Catholic and Jewish leaders discussed the week's headlines in light of faith.

== Later career ==
In 1980, McCall was elected to a five-year term as president of the Baptist World Alliance, representing 37 million Baptists in 120 nations. He had long been active in the Alliance, beginning with his attendance at the first BWA-sponsored Baptist World Youth Conference, in Prague, Czechoslovakia, when he was 16 years old.

In 1982, McCall ran for and lost in the SBC presidential election to conservative Texas pastor James T. Draper

In 1990, McCall and several others established the Baptist Cooperative Missions Program, which provided resources to help launch the Cooperative Baptist Fellowship, an alternative association of about 2,000 moderate and progressive Baptist congregations.

== Honors ==
McCall has been recognized through the endowment of the Duke K. McCall Chair of Christian Mission and World Christianity at the Baptist Theological Seminary at Richmond, Virginia, and in the naming of the Duke McCall Welcome Center on the Southern Seminary campus in Louisville, Kentucky. At Southern Seminary in August 2019, Dr. R. Albert Mohler Jr. announced the establishment of the Duke McCall Chair of Pastoral Leadership. He also held several honorary doctorates.
