= Reginald Bibby =

Canadian sociologist (born 1943)

Reginald Bibby OC
- Born: Reginald Wayne Bibby; April 3, 1943 (age 83); Edmonton, Alberta, Canada

Academic background
- Education: University of Alberta; Southern Baptist Theological Seminary; University of Calgary; Washington State University
- Thesis: Incomplete Outsiders (1974)

Academic work
- Discipline: Sociology
- Sub-discipline: Sociology of religion
- Institutions: University of Lethbridge
- Website: reginaldbibby.com

Reginald Wayne Bibby OC (born 1943) is a Canadian sociologist. He held the Board of Governors Research Chair in the Department of Sociology at the University of Lethbridge from 2001 to 2018.

Born on 3 April 1943 in Edmonton, Alberta, he received a Bachelor of Arts degree from the University of Alberta, a BD from the Southern Baptist Theological Seminary, a Master of Arts degree from the University of Calgary, and a PhD from Washington State University.

In 2006, he was appointed an Officer of the Order of Canada.

== Selected bibliography ==
- The Emerging Generation: An Inside Look at Canada's Teenagers. Co-authored with Don Posterski (1985, ISBN 0-7725-1818-1)
- Fragmented Gods: The Poverty and Potential of Religion in Canada (1987, ISBN 0-7737-5422-9)
- Mosaic Madness: The Poverty and Potential of Life in Canada (1990, ISBN 0-7737-5399-0)
- Teen Trends: A Nation in Motion. Co-authored with Don Posterski (1992, ISBN 0-7737-5531-4)
- Unknown Gods: The Ongoing Story of Religion in Canada (1993, ISBN 0-7737-5606-X)
- The Bibby Report: Social Trends Canadian Style (1995, ISBN 0-7737-5748-1)
- There's Got to Be More! Connecting Churches & Canadians (1995, ISBN 1-55145-048-8)
- Canada's Teens: Today, Yesterday, and Tomorrow (2001, ISBN 0-7737-6181-0)
- Restless Gods: The Renaissance of Religion in Canada (2002, ISBN 2-89507-555-7)
- Restless Churches: How Canada's Churches Can Contribute to the Emerging Religious Renaissance (2004, ISBN 2-89507-518-2)
- The Boomer Factor: What Canada's Most Famous Generation Is Leaving Behind (2006, ISBN 978-0-9780554-4-8)
- The Emerging Millennials: How Canada's Newest Generation Is Responding to Change & Choice (2009, ISBN 978-0-9810614-0-5)
- Beyond the Gods and Back: The Demise and Rise of Religion in Canada (2011, ISBN 978-0-9810614-2-9)
- A New Day: The Resilience & Restructuring of Religion in Canada (2012, ISBN 978-0 9810614-5-0)
- Canada's Catholics: Vitality and Hope in a New Era. Co-Authored with Angus Reid (2016, ISBN 978-2-89688-261-8)
- Resilient Gods: Being Pro-Religious, Low Religious, or No Religious in Canada (2017, ISBN 978-0-7748900-6-9)
- The Millennial Mosaic: How Pluralism and Choice Are Shaping Canadian Youth and the Future of Canada. Co-Authored with Joel Thiessen and Monetta Bailey (2019, ISBN 978-1-4597456-0-5)
