= The Southern Baptist Journal of Theology =

- Language: English
- Edited by: Stephen J. Wellum

Publication details
- History: 1997-present
- Publisher: Southern Baptist Theological Seminary (United States)
- Frequency: Quarterly

Standard abbreviations
- ISO 4: South. Baptist J. Theol.

Indexing
- ISSN: 1520-7307
- OCLC no.: 37544145

Links
- Journal homepage

The Southern Baptist Journal of Theology is a quarterly academic journal published by Southern Baptist Theological Seminary. It was established in 1997, after the seminary had lost control of Review and Expositor. The founding editor-in-chief was Paul R. House, while the current editor is Stephen J. Wellum.

== Abstracting and indexing ==
The journal is abstracted and indexed in the ATLA Religion Database.
