= Gregg R. Allison =

American evangelical theologian and professor

- Known for: Historical Theology; Sojourners and Strangers; Roman Catholic Theology and Practice

Academic background
- Education: Northern Illinois University (B.S.); Trinity Evangelical Divinity School (M.Div., Ph.D.)

Gregg R. Allison is an American evangelical theologian and author who serves as Professor of Christian Theology at The Southern Baptist Theological Seminary (SBTS) in Louisville, Kentucky. He previously taught at Western Seminary in Portland, Oregon, and has served in various leadership roles in the Evangelical Theological Society (ETS), including Secretary and Book Review Editor for the Journal of the Evangelical Theological Society.

== Career ==
Allison joined SBTS in 2003 after nine years on the faculty of Western Seminary (Portland). In addition to his academic posts, he spent 18 years with Campus Crusade for Christ (now Cru), including missionary service in Italy and Switzerland, and co-pastored a church in Lugano, Switzerland. He is also noted as a senior fellow with the Ethics & Religious Liberty Commission (ERLC).

== Education ==
- B.S., Northern Illinois University
- M.Div., Ph.D., Trinity Evangelical Divinity School

== Research interests ==
Allison's research and teaching focus on ecclesiology, pneumatology, and theological anthropology.

== Selected works ==
- Allison, Gregg R. Historical Theology: An Introduction to Christian Doctrine. Grand Rapids: Zondervan, 2011. ISBN ISBN 978-0-310-230137.
- —— Sojourners and Strangers: The Doctrine of the Church. Wheaton: Crossway, 2012. ISBN ISBN 978-1-58134-6619.
- —— Roman Catholic Theology and Practice: An Evangelical Assessment. Wheaton: Crossway, 2014. ISBN ISBN 978-1-4335-0116-6.
- —— The Baker Compact Dictionary of Theological Terms. Grand Rapids: Baker Books, 2016. ISBN ISBN 978-0-8010-1576-2.
- Allison, Gregg R.; Castaldo, Christopher A. The Unfinished Reformation: What Unites and Divides Catholics and Protestants after 500 Years. Grand Rapids: Zondervan, 2016. ISBN ISBN 978-0-310-527930.
- House, Brad; Allison, Gregg R. MultiChurch: Exploring the Future of Multisite. Grand Rapids: Zondervan, 2017. ISBN ISBN 978-0-310-530534.
- Allison, Gregg R. 50 Core Truths of the Christian Faith: A Guide to Understanding and Teaching Theology. Grand Rapids: Baker Books, 2018. ISBN ISBN 978-0-8010-1912-8.
- Allison, Gregg R.; Köstenberger, Andreas J. The Holy Spirit (Theology for the People of God). Nashville: B&H Academic, 2020. ISBN ISBN 978-1-4627-5774-9.
- Allison, Gregg R. The Church: An Introduction (Short Studies in Systematic Theology). Wheaton: Crossway, 2021. ISBN ISBN 978-1-4335-6246-4.
- —— Embodied: Living as Whole People in a Fractured World. Grand Rapids: Baker Books, 2021. ISBN ISBN 978-1-5409-0005-0.
- —— 40 Questions about Roman Catholicism. Grand Rapids: Kregel Academic, 2021. ISBN ISBN 978-0-8254-4716-7.
- —— God, Gift, and Guide: Knowing the Holy Spirit. Nashville: B&H Books, 2023. ISBN ISBN 978-1-0877-6685-0.
