= Wayne Oates =

American psychologist and educator (1917–1999)

- Born: Wayne Edward Oates; June 24, 1917; Greenville, South Carolina, U.S.
- Died: October 21, 1999 (aged 82)
- Resting place: Cave Hill Cemetery; Louisville, Kentucky, U.S.
- Occupations: Psychologist; educator
- Spouse: Pauline
- Children: 2

Wayne Edward Oates (June 24, 1917 – October 21, 1999) was an American psychologist and religious educator who is often considered to have coined the word 'workaholic'.

== Early life ==
Born to an impoverished family in Greenville, South Carolina in June 1917, Oates was abandoned by his father in infancy and was brought up by his grandmother and sister while his mother supported them by working in a cotton mill. At the age of fourteen he was one of a small number of impoverished clever boys selected to serve as a United States House of Representatives Page. He enjoyed the experience and it inspired him to become the first of his family to enter higher education. He studied at Mars Hill Junior College, Wake Forest University, Southern Baptist Theological Seminary, Union Theological Seminary, and the University of Louisville School of Medicine. He graduated from Southern with a PhD in Psychology of Religion.

== Career ==
Oates joined the School of Theology in 1947 as professor of psychology of religion and pastoral care. He held the post until he joined the University of Louisville Medical School in 1974.

Oates' cross-disciplinary approach combined psychological models with pastoral sensitivity, and biblical teaching. The result changed conventional attitudes to counselling to yield the modern pastoral care movement. Oates developed the 'trialogue' form of pastoral counseling: a conversation between counselor, counselee, and the Holy Spirit. The first of his fifty-seven books, was a short volume entitled Alcohol in and out of the Church (1940) and there was a long interval before the reworking of his doctoral thesis The Significance of the Work of Sigmund Freud for the Christian Faith under the autobiographical title The Christian Pastor (1951). The trialogue concept was introduced in The Presence of God in Pastoral Counseling. With the publication of Confessions of a Workaholic in 1971 he helped popularize the neologism 'workaholic'.

In 1984 the American Psychiatric Association granted Oates the Oskar Pfister Award for his contributions to the relationship between psychiatry and religion.

== Personal life ==
He married Pauline with whom he had two sons. They lived in Louisville, Kentucky until his death in October 1999. He is buried in Cave Hill Cemetery in Louisville.

== Bibliography ==
- Alcohol in and out of the Church, (Nashville TN: Broadman, 1940)
- The Christian Pastor, (Philadelphia PA: Westminster Press, 1951)
- Grace Sufficient, (Nashville TN: Broadman Press, 1951) —pamphlet
- The Revelation of God in Human Suffering, (Philadelphia PA: Westminster Press, 1952)
- The Bible in pastoral care (Source books for ministers), (Grand Rapids MI: Baker Books, 1953) ISBN 0-8010-0561-2
- Anxiety in Christian Experience, (Philadelphia PA: Westminster Press, 1955)
- Religious Factors in Mental Illness, (New York NY: Association Press, 1955)
- Where to go for Help, (Philadelphia PA: Westminster Press, 1957)
- The Religious Dimensions of Personality, (New York NY:Association Press, 1957)
- What Psychology Says About Religion, (New York NY:Association Press, 1958)
- An Introduction to Pastoral Counseling, (Nashville TN: Broadman Press, 1959)
- Christ and Selfhood, (New York NY: Association Press, 1961)
- The Minister's Own Mental Health, (Great Neck NY: Channel Press, 1961)
- Protestant Pastoral Counseling, (Philadelphia PA: Westminster Press, 1962)
- When Religion Gets Sick, (Philadelphia PA: Westminster John Knox Press, 1970) ISBN 0-664-24891-8
- Confessions of a Workaholic, (New York NY: World Publishing Co., 1971) ISBN 0-687-09393-7
- Anxiety in Christian Experience, (Waco TX: Word Books, 1971) ISBN 0-87680-204-8
- The Psychology of Religion, (Waco TX: Word Books, 1973) ISBN 0-87680-331-1
- Pastoral Counseling, (Philadelphia PA: Westminster Press, 1974) ISBN 0-664-20992-0
- Pastoral Care and Counseling in Grief and Separation, (Philadelphia PA: Fortress Press, 1976) ISBN 0-8006-0554-3
- Workaholics, Make Laziness Work for You, (New York NY: Doubleday, 1978) ISBN 0-385-12977-7
- The Religious Care of the Psychiatric Patient, (Philadelphia PA: Westminster John Knox, 1978)
- Nurturing Silence in a Noisy Heart, (New York NY: Doubleday, 1979) ISBN 0-385-14787-2
- Pastor's Handbook, (Philadelphia PA: Westminster John Knox, 1980) ISBN 0-664-24300-2
- Your Particular Grief, (Philadelphia PA: Westminster John Knox, 1981) ISBN 0-664-24376-2
- The Struggle to Be Free, (Philadelphia PA: Westminster John Knox, 1983) —autobiography
- Managing Your Stress, (Minneapolis MN: Augsburg Fortress, 1985) ISBN 0-8006-1880-7
- People in Pain: Guidelines for Pastoral Care, with Charles E. Oates (Philadelphia PA: The Westminster Press, 1985) ISBN 0-664-24674-5
- The Presence of God in Pastoral Counseling, (Waco TX: Word Books, 1986) ISBN 0-84990-475-7
- Behind the Masks: Personality Disorders in Religious Behavior, (Louisville KY: The Westminster Press, 1987) ISBN 0-664-24028-3
- Temptation: A Biblical and Psychological Approach, (Louisville KY: Westminster John Knox Press, 1991) ISBN 0-664-25113-7
- A Practical Handbook for Ministry: From the Writings of Wayne E. Oates, Thomas W. Chapman, ed. (Louisville KY: Westminster John Knox Press, 1992) ISBN 0-664-22154-8
- The Care of Troublesome People, (Bethesda MD: Alban Institute, 1994) ISBN 1-5669-9133-1
- Luck: A Secular Faith, (Louisville KY: Westminster John Knox Press, 1995) ISBN 0-664-25536-1
- Grief, Transition, and Loss: A Pastor's Practical Guide, (Minneapolis MN: Augsburg Fortress Press, 1997) ISBN 0-8006-2864-0
