= Bronson Ray =

T. Bronson Ray

Personal life
- Born: 14 August 1868 Buckeye, Garrard Co., KY
- Died: 1 January 1934 (aged 65)
- Spouse: Davie Bruce Jasper
- Education: Georgetown College, Georgetown, KY

Religious life
- Religion: Christian: Southern Baptist
- Church: Immanuel Baptist Church, Nashville TN

Senior posting
- Post: Executive Secretary, Foreign Missions Board
- Period in office: 1893–1934

T. Bronson Ray (14 August 1868 – 1 January 1934) was a Southern Baptist minister who administered the church's foreign mission board (now the International Mission Board), eventually becoming its Executive Secretary.

Ray was born 14 August 1868 in Buckeye, Garrard Co., Kentucky, the son of William Ray, a physician, and his wife Nancy Jane. Ray married Maude Wayts in 1897. She died in 1901 and in 1909 Ray married Davie Bruce Jasper. They had a daughter. Ray died 1 January 1934.

Ray received his secondary education at the Elliott Institute, Kirksville, Kentucky, and in normal school in Lebanon, Ohio. He earned an M.A. from Georgetown College, Georgetown, Kentucky in 1895, and received the degree of Th.M. from the Southern Baptist Theological Seminary of Louisville, Kentucky in 1898. In 1909 his alma mater, Georgetown College, awarded him a D.D.

Ray was ordained in Georgetown, Kentucky in 1893. He was Pastor of the Clear Creek Baptist Church near Versailles, Kentucky, and later Pastor at the Immanuel Baptist Church in Nashville, Tennessee.

In 1906 Ray became Educational Secretary of the Foreign Missions Board in Richmond, Virginia, where his duties consisted of "editing books suitable for mission classes and writing books on mission subjects." He continued with this work for the rest of his life, eventually becoming Executive Secretary of the Foreign Missions Board in 1928. In spite of a lifelong career in the foreign missions field, Ray is known to have travelled abroad only once, in 1910, to Brazil, an experience he wrote a book about.

== Works ==
- Highway of Mission Thought (1907)
- Southern Baptist Foreign Missions (1910)
- Brazilian Sketches (1912)
