= Kentuckiana Metroversity =

Consortium of education institutions

The Kentuckiana Metroversity, Inc., is a consortium of eight institutions of higher education in the Louisville metropolitan area, founded in 1970. Students attending any one of these schools can take classes at any other school within the consortium.

== Campuses ==
The following campuses are affiliated with the Kentuckiana Metroversity:

- Bellarmine University
- Indiana University Southeast
- Ivy Tech Community College Southern Indiana
- Jefferson Community and Technical College
- Louisville Presbyterian Theological Seminary
- Southern Baptist Theological Seminary
- Spalding University
- University of Louisville
