= Southern Baptist Theological Seminary =

Seminary in Louisville, Kentucky, USA

Coordinates: 38.24846°N 85.68689°W

The Southern Baptist Theological Seminary
- Motto: For the truth. For the church. For the world. For the glory of God
- Type: Private
- Established: 1859; 167 years ago
- Accreditation: ATS; SACSCOC
- Affiliations: Kentuckiana Metroversity and Boyce College
- Religious affiliation: Southern Baptist Convention
- Endowment: $95.5 million
- President: R. Albert Mohler Jr.
- Provost: Paul M. Akin
- Academic staff: 72
- Students: 4,448 (2021–2022)
- Location: Louisville, Kentucky
- Campus: Suburban 100 acres
- Website: sbts.edu

The Southern Baptist Theological Seminary (SBTS) is a Baptist theological institute in Louisville, Kentucky. The seminary was founded in 1859 in Greenville, South Carolina, where it was at first housed on the campus of Furman University. The seminary has been an innovator in theological education, establishing one of the first Ph.D. programs in theology and religion in the year 1892. It is affiliated with the Southern Baptist Convention.

After being closed during the Civil War, it moved in 1877 to a newly built campus in downtown Louisville and moved to its current location in 1926 in the Crescent Hill neighborhood. In 1953, Southern became one of the few seminaries to offer a full, accredited degree course in church music. For more than fifty years Southern has been one of the world's largest theological seminaries, with an FTE (full-time equivalent) enrollment of over 3,300 students in 2015.

== History ==
=== 19th century to early 20th century (1835–1950) ===
Basil Manly Sr. first issued a call for a new seminary for Baptists in the south in 1835. Over the next two decades, he was the driving force in a movement to establish the Southern Baptist Theological Seminary.

In 1856, South Carolina Baptists gathered together and met in Greenville, South Carolina with James P. Boyce to discuss the need to finance a seminary. In that meeting, Southern Baptists agreed to pledge $100,000 in the establishment of a theological school. In 1857, Boyce convinced members of the convention in Louisville, Kentucky, to approve a motion to establish The Southern Baptist Theological Seminary. In the fall of 1859, Southern began its first academic year with 26 students. The seminary continued to grow until it temporarily closed from 1861 to 1865 due to American Civil War. After the war, the seminary had to recover at a different location. The Board of Trustees along with Boyce decided the new location would be the seminary's current location of Louisville.

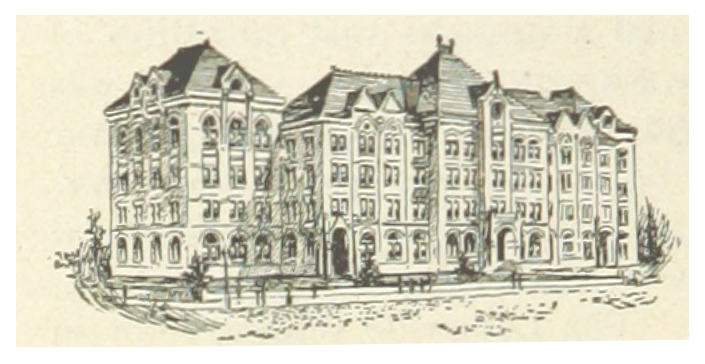
Southern in 1891

In 1889, John A. Broadus became the seminary's second president. Attendance and enrollment continued to grow and the Master of Divinity (M.Div.) and Doctor of Philosophy (Ph.D.) began to be offered as graduate degrees starting in the early 1890s. After Broadus, William Whitsitt became the third President of Southern in 1895. After a difficult tenure along with controversy dealing with Landmarkism amongst Baptists during that period, Whitsitt was succeeded by E.Y. Mullins (Boyce College's main dormitory is named after him) as president. Under Mullins, the seminary reached an endowment of an estimated 1.8 million dollars. It was during the early 1900s when women were beginning to be admitted to the classes.

=== Modern history (1950s–present) ===
In 1951, Duke McCall became the President of Southern. Under McCall's leadership, the School of Religious Education was established to prepare students for Christian education. Three academic schools were organized: School of Religious Education, School of Theology, and the School of Music. A chair in evangelism was dedicated to the American evangelist Billy Graham in 1966. Southern began to offer the Doctor of Ministry (D.Min.) program in 1970. Enrollment under McCall reached an estimated 1,500 students. Boyce College (known as Boyce Bible College at the time) was established as an adult education program in 1974. McCall retired in 1981 and his legacy has drawn praise and controversy.

Roy Honeycutt succeeded McCall as the 8th president of Southern in 1981. Under his leadership, the seminary opened the Carver School of Church Social Work and reached an all-time peak in enrollment of students in 1986. Honeycutt also oversaw the leadership of the seminary during a tumultuous time within the Southern Baptist Convention, now known as the Southern Baptist Convention conservative resurgence. After the election of Adrian Rogers as the president of the Southern Baptist Convention, the school began to slowly return to its traditional theological positions such as the inerrancy of Scripture. Honeycutt retired in 1992.

The seminary Board of Trustees then elected R. Albert Mohler as the 9th President of Southern in 1993. Under Mohler's leadership, every member of the faculty was required to sign the confession of the seminary known as the "Abstract of Principles" and the "Baptist Faith and Message". They were also required to believe that the Bible is without any error. Boyce Bible College, then an adult education program, was reorganized and established as an undergraduate college. In 2017, the seminary experienced the largest enrollment of students ever in the school's history with over 5,000 students enrolled.

For the year 2021–2022, it had 4,448 students.

== Campus ==
In the wake of the Civil War, the seminary suspended classes for several years. With the financial help of several wealthy Baptists, including John D. Rockefeller and a group of Kentucky business leaders who promised to underwrite the construction of a new campus, the seminary relocated to Fifth Street and Broadway in downtown Louisville, Kentucky, in 1877.

In 1926, during the administration of Southern president Edgar Y. Mullins, the seminary occupied "The Beeches", a 100-acre (0.40 km^{2}) suburban campus east of the city center designed by the Frederick Law Olmsted firm. The campus now contains 10 academic and residential buildings in Georgian architecture and three housing villages for married students.

== Civil rights history ==
In 1951, President Duke Kimbrough McCall integrated the campus, in defiance of Kentucky state laws that established segregation at public facilities. At the height of the Civil Rights Movement, Southern would become the only SBC agency to host a visit by Baptist minister and civil rights leader Martin Luther King Jr. (1961). During King's address at SBTS, he mentioned he had been to the seminary's chapel several times in the past when accompanying his mother since King's mother was an organist for the Women's Auxiliary of the National Baptist Convention.

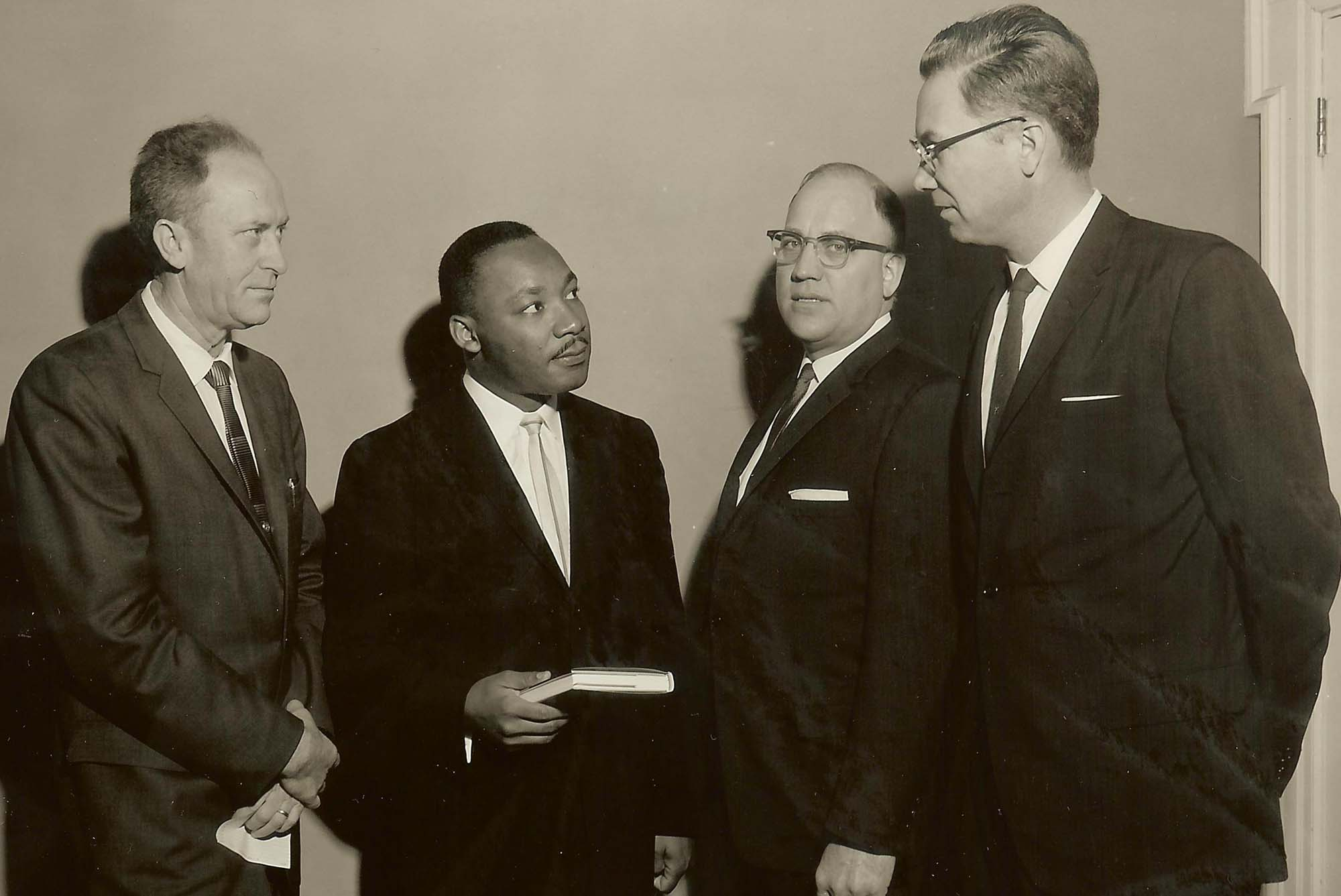
Martin Luther King Jr. preached in Southern Seminary chapel in 1961. King met with professors (from left to right) Henlee Barnette, Nolan Howington and Allen Graves.

As a result, many donors withheld their gifts to Southern, and some demanded McCall's resignation for letting King speak in the seminary chapel.

In 2018, a report was released about its connections to slavery. Controversy regarding this subject was circulated and interracial ministers coalition requested The Southern Baptist Theological Seminary to financially support nearby black colleges as a result. Despite the request, The Southern Baptist Theological Seminary denied the request. As a response to the request, President R. Albert Mohler Jr. and board Chair F.Matthew Schmucker released the following statement:

“We agree with the policy of the Southern Baptist Convention in this regard, and we do not believe that financial reparations are the appropriate response,”

There are claims stating that the founders owned more than 50 slaves.

== Administration and organizational structure ==
In 1938, Southern was among the first group of seminaries and divinity schools accredited by the Association of Theological Schools in the United States and Canada. Thirty years later, in 1968, Southern was one of the first seminaries to be accredited by its regional accrediting body, Southern Association of Colleges and Schools.

Throughout its history, Southern has been an innovator in theological education, establishing one of the first Ph.D. programs in religion (1892), the first department of Christian missions (1902), the first curriculum in religious education (1925), and the first accredited, seminary-based social work program (1984).

In 1953, President McCall and the trustees reorganized the institution along the lines of a small university. The curriculum was distributed among three graduate-professional schools—Theology, headed by Dean Penrose St. Amant; Religious Education, led by Dean Gaines S. Dobbins; and Church Music, under Dean Forrest Heeren.

In 1984, Anne Davis became founding dean of the Carver School of Church Social Work, which launched the first seminary-based Master of Social Work program to be accredited by the Council on Social Work Education (1987). The school was disbanded in 1997 by a subsequent seminary administration. It decided that secular social work was inappropriate for a seminary, and replaced the program with a school for training evangelists, missionaries and church-growth specialists.

In 1968, Southern helped establish Kentuckiana Metroversity, a local consortium of two seminaries, two state universities, a community college and two private colleges. They offer a joint library catalog, cross-registration of any student in any member institution, and faculty and cultural exchanges. In 1970, Southern helped create the Theological Education Association of Mid-America (TEAM-A), one of the United States' first seminary "clusters," a consortium of five schools related to the Presbyterian, Wesleyan Methodist, Disciples of Christ, Roman Catholic and Baptist traditions. They provide inter-institutional team teaching, cross-registration among students, and a joint library catalog.

The seminary is governed by a board of trustees nominated and elected by the SBC. It receives almost one-third of its $31 million annual budget from the SBC Cooperative Program, the unified financial support system that distributes gifts from the congregations to the agencies and institutions of the denomination. In fiscal year 2007–08, Southern received $9.5 million through the Cooperative Program. Its endowments and invested reserves totaled $78 million.

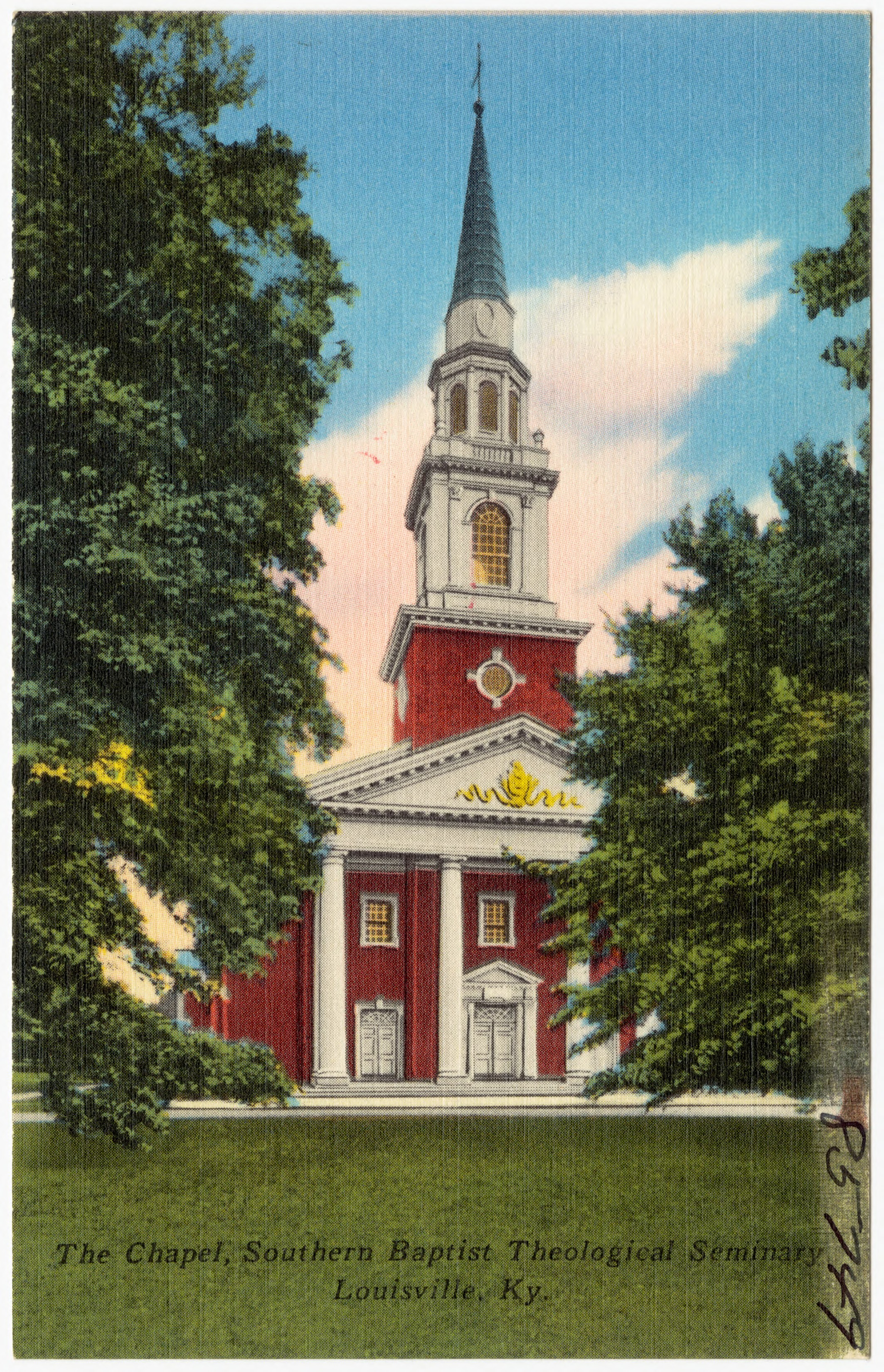
The Chapel

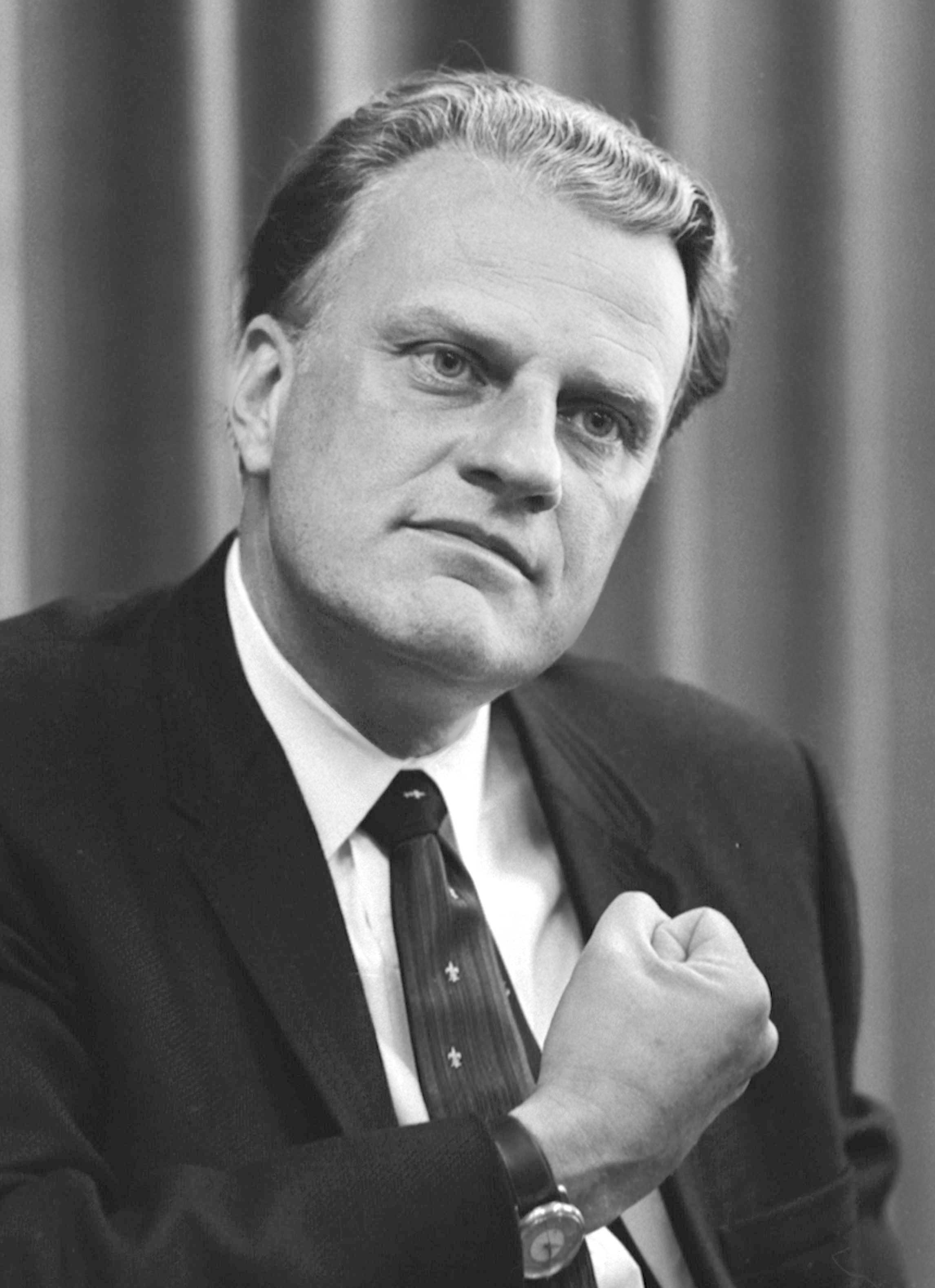
The Billy Graham School was launched in 1994, with Graham himself present at Southern's campus

Southern is currently organized into three schools:

- The School of Theology
- The Billy Graham School of Missions, Evangelism, and Ministry
- Boyce College

== Academics, philosophy and faculty ==
The seminary's mission statement is: "Under the Lordship of Jesus Christ, the mission of The Southern Baptist Theological Seminary is to be totally committed to the Bible as the Word of God, to the Great Commission as our mandate, and to be a servant of the churches of the Southern Baptist Convention by training, educating, and preparing ministers of the gospel for more faithful service."

Southern was one of the first seminaries in the nation to offer the PhD degree, beginning in 1892. During the 1970s and 1980s, it had the largest accredited PhD program in religion in the United States. It was the first seminary in the nation to offer courses in religious education, beginning in 1903. This program ultimately expanded into a School of Religious Education in 1953.

In 1907, William Owen Carver founded the Women's Missionary Union Training School, which eventually became the Carver School of Missions and Social Work.

In 1910, Southern established the Norton Lectures, a series of lectures on "Science and Philosophy in their Relations to Religion." Speakers have included conservative scholars William A. Dembski, Marvin Olasky, Gregory Alan Thornbury, and Alvin Plantinga.

In 1953, Southern became one of the few seminaries to offer a full, accredited degree course in church music.

After endowing the Billy Graham Chair of Evangelism in 1965 (the first such professorship in any Baptist seminary), Southern expanded it in 1994 into the Billy Graham School of Missions, Evangelism and Church Growth. It is the first program in the SBC dedicated solely to training missionaries and evangelists.

In the 1980s, Southern became the first seminary or divinity school to establish a school of church social work offering an accredited, seminary-based M.S.W. degree.

In 1993, the seminary's president Albert Mohler came into office re-affirming the seminary's historic "Abstract of Principles", part of the original charter of Southern created in 1858. The charter stated that every Professor must agree to "teach in accordance with, and not contrary to, the Abstract of Principles hereinafter laid down" and that "a departure" from the principles in the Abstract of Principles would be grounds for resignation or removal by the Trustees.

Mohler, following these instructions, required that current professors affirm, without any spoken or unspoken reservations, the Abstract of Principles. Professors were also asked to affirm the Baptist Faith and Message (BF&M, the doctrinal statement of the SBC), since Southern is an agency of the SBC and the SBC mandated affirmation of the BF&M as a requirement for continued employment. An overwhelming majority of faculty affirmed the Abstract of Principles, but declined to affirm some of the doctrines stated in the BF&M which had recently been amended to bring it in line with more conservative positions held by the SBC. In the wake of the subsequent dismissal or resignation of a large percentage of the faculty, Southern has replaced them with new professors who agree to adhere to the BF&M in addition to the seminary's Abstract of Principles.

In 2005, Southern revised its pastoral care and counseling major. It ended the counseling program which it had been offering since the 1950s, under Wayne Oates and his colleagues. It replaced it with the "Nouthetic Counseling" or Bible-based counseling program, championed by Jay E. Adams since the 1970s. The dean of Southern Seminary's school of theology stated that the change was necessary because a successful integration of modern psychology and theology was not possible.

== Notable associates ==
=== Alumni ===
- Charles C. Baldwin, Chief of Chaplains of the United States Air Force 2004–2008
- Reginald Bibby, sociologist
- Douglas Carver, Chief of Chaplains of the United States Army 2007–2011
- Dondi E. Costin, Chief of Chaplains of the United States Air Force 2015–2018, 6th president of Liberty University 2023–Present
- W.A. Criswell, pastor of the First Baptist Church of Dallas, Texas; author; and president of the Southern Baptist Convention (1969–1970).
- Miguel A. De La Torre, author on Hispanic religious life; social ethics professor at Iliff School of Theology in Denver, CO, 1999–present.
- Mark Dever, pastor of Capitol Hill Baptist Church; well-known speaker, author, and theologian.
- Amzi Dixon, pastor of Moody Church, Chicago, IL (1906–1911); and Metropolitan Tabernacle, London, England (1911–1919).
- Wilmer Clemont Fields (1922–2018), vice president for public relations for the Southern Baptist Convention; editor of Baptist Record and Baptist Program; director of the Baptist Press.
- Steven Furtick, pastor of Elevation Church; well-known pastor, speaker, and author.
- Pleasant Daniel Gold, Baptist pastor and newspaper publisher
- David P. Gushee, Christian ethicist, historian, public intellectual, and Holocaust scholar.
- Paul R. House, scholar, author, and seminary professor.
- Ben Campbell Johnson, Professor Emeritus at Columbia Theological Seminary, author
- Clarence Jordan, founder of Koinonia Farm (forerunner of Habitat for Humanity) and Greek scholar who translated the New Testament into a Cotton Patch version using the vernacular of the Civil Rights era in the South.
- R.T. Kendall, pastor of Westminster Chapel, London, England, 1977–2002.
- Beth Kennett, politician and United Church of Christ minister
- Matt Lockett, member of the Kentucky House of Representatives for the 39th District, 2021–Present
- David Gordon Lyon, Hollis Chair at Harvard Divinity School and founding curator of Semitic Museum
- James Merritt, pastor, president of the Southern Baptist Convention from 2000 to 2002
- Russell D. Moore, second president of the Ethics & Religious Liberty Commission.
- J. Frank Norris, fundamentalist Baptist pastor, trustee at Southwestern Baptist Theological Seminary, established Arlington Baptist College.
- Grady Nutt, religious humorist and national television personality; died in air crash, 1982.
- Wayne Oates, an American psychologist and religious educator who coined the word 'workaholic'.
- Luis G. Pedraja, Latino theologian, philosopher, author, scholar and educator
- Cicero Washington Pruitt, missionary to Northern China.
- Bronson Ray, Executive Secretary of the Foreign Mission Board of the Southern Baptist Convention (1928–1932).
- William Bell Riley, late founder of the World Christian Fundamentals Association
- Lee Roberson, founder of Tennessee Temple University, influential leader in the Southwide Baptist Fellowship, and former pastor of Highland Park Baptist Church in Chattanooga, Tennessee
- Gregory Alan Thornbury, president of The King's College in New York City (2013–2018).
- Jeff Struecker, pastor, author, and former US Army Ranger Chaplain.
- Ed Stetzer, author, speaker, researcher, pastor, church planter, and Christian missiologist.
- John D. W. Watts, Old Testament Scholar and Theologian, Old Testament Editor for the Word Biblical Commentary, Professor.
- James Emery White, pastor, author, and Professor of Theology and Culture
- Steve Willis, pastor and health activist
- Norman Barton Wood, pastor, author, lecturer
- Bryant Wright, pastor, president of the Southern Baptist Convention from 2010 to 2011.

=== Faculty ===
- Gregg R. Allison, Professor of Church History
- Michael Haykin, Professor of Church History.
- Timothy Paul Jones, author, apologetics scholar, and professor of Christian family ministry.
- Thomas R. Schreiner, New Testament scholar.
- Crawford Howell Toy (1869–1879), Hebrew and Old Testament scholar. Dismissed for his views on biblical inspiration and evolution.
- Bruce Ware, theologian, former chairman of the Department of Biblical and Systematic Theology at Trinity Evangelical Divinity School and former president of the Evangelical Theological Society.
- Stephen J. Wellum, Professor of Christian Theology. Proponent of progressive covenantalism and editor of The Southern Baptist Journal of Theology.

=== Presidents ===
| No. | Name | Term |
|---|---|---|
| 1 | James Petigru Boyce (Note: Boyce carried the title "Chairman of the Faculty" from 1859 to 1887 before being named President.) | 1859–1888 |
| 2 | John Albert Broadus | 1888–1895 |
| 3 | William Heth Whitsitt | 1895–1899 |
| 4 | Edgar Young Mullins | 1899–1928 |
| 5 | John Richard Sampey (Note: Sampey served as acting president after the death of Mullins from 1928 to 1929 before being appointed to the full position.) | 1928–1942 |
| 6 | Ellis Adams Fuller | 1942–1950 |
| – | J. Clyde Turner (Note: Turner, who was president of the board of trustees, served as acting president.) | 1950–1951 |
| 7 | Duke Kimbrough McCall | 1951–1982 |
| 8 | Roy Lee Honeycutt | 1982–1993 |
| 9 | R. Albert Mohler Jr. | 1993–present |

== See also ==
- Louisville Presbyterian Theological Seminary
- Religion in Louisville, Kentucky
