= Louisville Presbyterian Theological Seminary =

Christian Seminary in Kentucky, United States

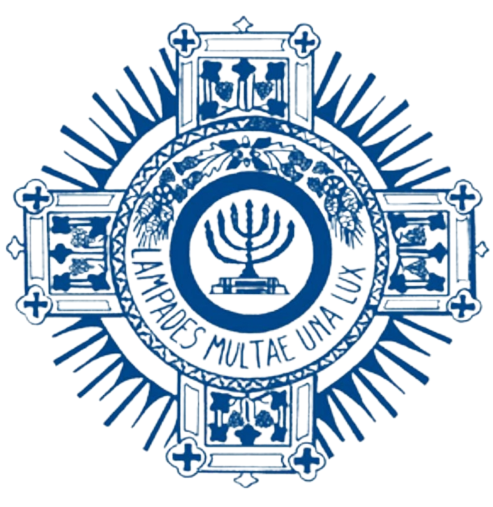
- Former names: Presbyterian Theological Seminary, Danville Theological Seminary
- Motto: Lampades Multae, Una Lux
- Motto in English: Many Lamps, One Light
- Type: Private seminary
- Established: 1853; 173 years ago
- Religious affiliation: Presbyterian Church
- Academic affiliations: Kentuckiana Metroversity
- President: Andrew Pomerville
- Location: Louisville, Kentucky, U.S. 38.2375°N 85.6850°W
- Campus: 38 acres (15 ha)
- Colors: Blue and white
- Website: lpts.edu

Louisville Presbyterian Theological Seminary, also referred to as Louisville Seminary, is a seminary affiliated with the Presbyterian Church (USA) and located in Louisville, Kentucky. It is one of 12 PC(USA) seminaries and it identifies as an ecumenical seminary, with recent student enrollment representing many faith traditions.

Though now located in Louisville, it was founded in 1853 in Danville, Kentucky (the site is now Centre College) and was known as the Danville Theological Seminary. Though it thrived in its early years, the Civil War took a great toll and by 1870 there were only six students enrolled, and as few as one professor at times, requiring classes to be taught by the faculty of Centre College.

The seminary is accredited by the Southern Association of Colleges and Schools Commission on Colleges, the Commission on Accreditation for Marriage and Family Therapy Education (COAMFTE), and the Association of Theological Schools. The seminary is located on land adjacent to the Cherokee-Seneca Parks.

== History ==
In 1893, a seminary opened in Louisville, operating out of Sunday School rooms in Second Presbyterian Church at Second and Broadway, with 31 students and six professors initially, and an endowment of $104,000. Longtime treasurer W.T. Grant died in 1901 and left his entire $300,000 estate to the seminary, which helped finance the construction of a new Gothic-style Campus.

Daniel S. Bentley had studied at the Presbyterian Theological Seminary in Danville.

In 1901, the still-struggling Danville seminary merged with the Louisville one. Because of the merger, it was the only institution supported simultaneously by the northern and southern branches of the modern Presbyterian Church (USA). Faculty and students have been drawn from both denominations. The two branches, which split during the Civil War, were reunited in 1983.

In the 1950s, Interstate 65 was planned to be constructed within a few feet of the seminary building. This led to a move in 1963 to a new campus off of Alta Vista Road, in the Cherokee-Seneca neighborhood. The old Gothic-style buildings eventually became the campus of Jefferson Community College, which is now a part of Jefferson Community and Technical College. The seminary eventually acquired the Gardencourt Mansion, and integrated it into the adjacent campus.

Dean K. Thompson was named eighth president of Louisville Presbyterian Theological Seminary on April 22, 2004, and began his term in June 2004.

Dean served the seminary until his retirement in 2010.

Michael Jinkins served as the ninth president of Louisville Presbyterian Theological Seminary from September 1, 2010, until his retirement on September 2, 2018. Jinkins' leadership was marked by a commitment to expanding the seminary's educational offerings and strengthening its financial position. Under Jinkins' administration, Louisville Seminary saw the introduction of several initiatives, most notably the Doors to Dialogue interfaith relations program and the Black Church Studies program. These programs were designed to enrich the curriculum and engage students in critical conversations on religion, culture, and society.

The most notable achievement during Jinkins’ presidency was the launch of the Covenant for the Future capital campaign in 2011. This campaign aimed to ensure the long-term financial health of the seminary and featured the creation of the Covenant Scholarship program, which was established in 2015.

Alton B. Pollard, III is an American theologian and educator, best known for his service as the 10th president of Louisville Presbyterian Theological Seminary. Pollard began his presidency on September 3, 2018, and announced his intention to retire in 2023.

On September 6, 2024, Andrew Pomerville was inaugurated as the 11th president and a professor of Practical Theology at Louisville Presbyterian Theological Seminary (LPTS) in a ceremony at Caldwell Chapel. Pomerville began his tenure on July 1, 2023, and was formally confirmed by the 226th General Assembly of the Presbyterian Church (U.S.A.) (PCUSA) in 2024.

== See also ==
- Presbyterianism
- Religion in Louisville, Kentucky
