= One true church =

View that only one Christian denomination is licit

The expression "one true church" refers to an ecclesiological position asserting that Jesus gave his authority in the Great Commission solely to a particular visible Christian institutional church—what is commonly called a denomination. This view is maintained by the Catholic Church, the Eastern Orthodox Church, the Oriental Orthodox communion, the Assyrian Church of the East, the Ancient Church of the East, and the Lutheran churches, as well as certain Baptists. Each of them maintains that their own specific institutional church (denomination) exclusively represents the one and only original church. The claim to the title of the "one true church" relates to the first of the Four Marks of the Church mentioned in the Nicene Creed: "one, holy, catholic, and apostolic church". As such, it also relates to claims of both catholicity and apostolic succession: asserting inheritance of the spiritual, ecclesiastical and sacramental authority and responsibility that Jesus Christ gave to the apostles.

The concept of schism somewhat moderates the competing claims between some churches—one can potentially repair schism, since they are striving for the same goal. For example, the Catholic and Eastern Orthodox churches each regard the other as schismatic and at very least heterodox, if not heretical, yet both have held dialogues and even partaken in Councils in attempts to resolve the division that exists between them.

Many Mainline Protestants regard all baptized Christians as members of a spiritual—not institutional—"Christian Church" regardless of their differing beliefs; this belief is sometimes referred to by the theological term "invisible church". Some Anglicans of Anglo-Catholic churchmanship espouse a version of branch theory which teaches that the true Christian Church comprises high church sects, such as the Anglican, Eastern Orthodox, Old Catholic, Oriental Orthodox, Scandinavian Lutheran, Moravian, Persian, and Roman Catholic branches.

Restorationist denominations, such as the Church of Jesus Christ of Latter-day Saints (LDS Church) also claim inheritance of the authority and responsibility that Jesus Christ conferred on the apostles. Other groups, such as Iglesia ni Cristo, believe in a last-messenger doctrine, where no such succession takes place. The Seventh-day Adventist Church regards itself to be the one true church in the sense of being a faithful remnant.

== Teachings by denomination ==
=== Catholicism ===
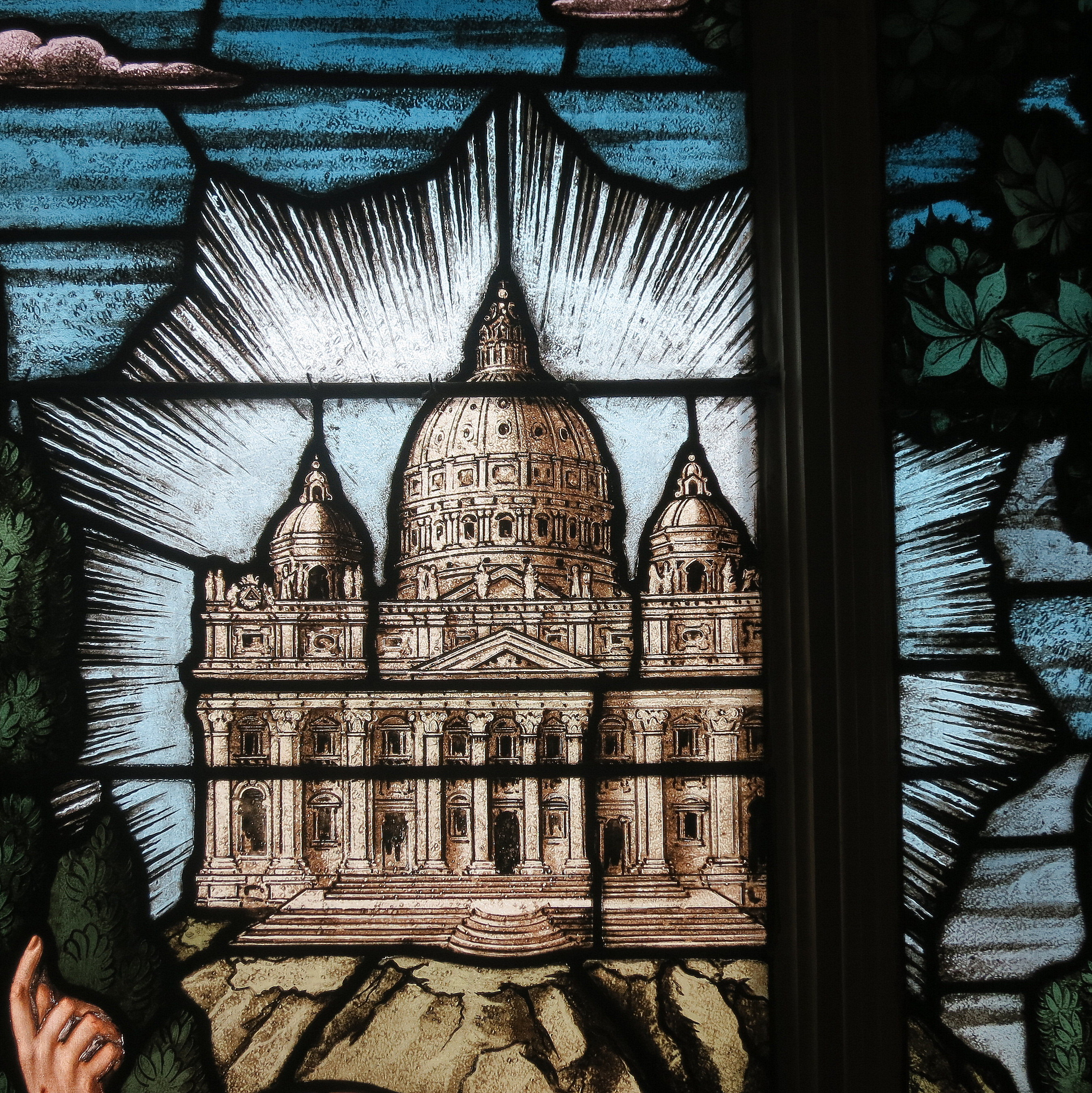
Stained glass window in a Catholic church depicting St. Peter's Basilica in Rome sitting "Upon this rock," a reference to Matthew 16:18

The Catholic Church teaches that Christ founded only "one true Church", and that this one true Church is the Catholic Church with the bishop of Rome (the pope) as its supreme, infallible head and locus of communion. From this follows that it regards itself as "the universal sacrament of salvation for the human race" and the "only true religion".

According to the Catechism of the Catholic Church, Catholic ecclesiology professes the Catholic Church to be the "sole Church of Christ"—i.e., the one true church defined as "one, holy, catholic, and apostolic" in the Four Marks of the Church in the Nicene Creed. The Council of Nicea (AD 325) originally formulated this teaching and ratified the Nicene Creed. The church teaches that only the Catholic Church was founded by Jesus Christ, who appointed the Twelve Apostles to continue his work as the Church's earliest bishops. Catholic belief holds that the Church "is the continuing presence of Jesus on earth", and that all duly-consecrated bishops have a lineal succession from the apostles. In particular, the Bishop of Rome (the Pope), is considered the successor to the apostle Simon Peter, from whom the Pope derives his supremacy over the Church. The 1943 papal encyclical Mystici corporis Christi further describes the Church as the Mystical Body of Christ. Thus the Catholic Church holds that "the one Church of Christ which in the Creed is professed as one, holy, catholic and apostolic ... This Church constituted and organized in the world as a society, subsists in the Catholic Church, which is governed by the successor of Peter and by the Bishops in communion with him." In Humani Generis, Pope Pius XII declared that "the Mystical Body of Christ and the Catholic Church are one and the same thing." The Second Vatican Council repeated this teaching, stating in the Decree on the Eastern Churches: "The Holy Catholic Church, which is the Mystical Body of Christ, is made up of the faithful who are organically united in the Holy Spirit by the same faith, the same sacraments and the same government."

In responding to some questions regarding the doctrine of the Church concerning itself, the Vatican's Sacred Congregation for the Doctrine of the Faith stated, "Clarius dicendum esset veram Ecclesiam esse solam Ecclesiam catholicam romanam..." ("It should be said more clearly that the Roman Catholic Church alone is the true Church..") And it also clarified that the term subsistit in used in reference to the Church in the Second Vatican Council's 1964 decree Lumen gentium "indicates the full identity of the Church of Christ with the Catholic Church".

The 1215 Fourth Lateran Council declared that: "There is one universal Church of the faithful, outside of which there is absolutely no salvation", a statement of what is known as the doctrine of extra Ecclesiam nulla salus.

In the encyclical Mortalium animos of 6 January 1928, Pope Pius XI wrote that "in this one Church of Christ no man can be or remain who does not accept, recognize and obey the authority and supremacy of Peter and his legitimate successors" and quoted the statement of Lactantius: "The Catholic Church is alone in keeping the true worship. This is the fount of truth, this the house of Faith, this the temple of God: if any man enter not here, or if any man go forth from it, he is a stranger to the hope of life and salvation." Accordingly, the Second Vatican Council of 1962–1965 declared: "Whosoever, [...] knowing that the Catholic Church was made necessary by Christ, would refuse to enter or to remain in it, could not be saved. In the same document, the Council continued: "The Church recognizes that in many ways she is linked with those who, being baptized, are honored with the name of Christian, though they do not profess the faith in its entirety or do not preserve unity of communion with the successor of Peter." And in a decree on ecumenism, Unitatis redintegratio, it stated: "Catholics must gladly acknowledge and esteem the truly Christian endowments from our common heritage which are to be found among our separated brethren. It is right and salutary to recognise the riches of Christ and virtuous works in the lives of others who are bearing witness to Christ, sometimes even to the shedding of their blood. For God is always wonderful in His works and worthy of all praise."

The Catholic Church teaches that the fullness of the "means of salvation" exists only in the Catholic Church, but the church acknowledges that the Holy Spirit can make use of ecclesial communities separated from itself to "impel towards Catholic unity" and thus bring people to salvation in the Catholic Church ultimately. It teaches that anyone who is saved is saved through the Catholic Church but that people can be saved ex voto and by pre-baptismal martyrdom as well as when conditions of invincible ignorance are present, although invincible ignorance in itself is not a means of salvation.

Catholic theology regards formal schismatics as outside the church, understanding by "formal schismatics" baptized "persons who, knowing the true nature of the Church, have personally and deliberately committed the sin of schism". The situation, for instance, of those who have been brought up from childhood within a group not in communion with Rome, and who are acting in good faith and have maintained almost the entirety of the orthodox faith, differs. This nuanced view applies especially to the churches of Eastern Christianity, more particularly still to the Eastern Orthodox Church, though doctrinal impediments still remain, such as disagreement over the primacy of the Roman See, papal infallibility, the nature of Purgatory, indulgences, the Immaculate Conception, and a few other important doctrines.

=== Orthodoxy ===
The Eastern Orthodox Church (officially the Orthodox Catholic Church) identifies its confederative communion of Orthodox churches as the "One, Holy, Catholic, and Apostolic Church" of the Nicene-Constantinopolitan Creed and applies this title in conciliar and other official documents, for instance, in the Constantinople synods held in 1836 and 1838 and in correspondence with Pope Pius IX (r. 1846–1878) and with Pope Leo XIII (r. 1878–1903).

=== Lutheranism ===
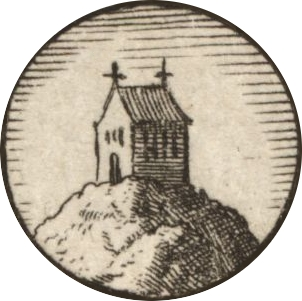
...one holy Church is to continue forever. The Church is the congregation of saints, in which the Gospel is rightly taught and the Sacraments are rightly administered. — Augsburg Confession

The Lutheran Church views itself as the "main trunk of the historical Christian Tree" founded by Christ and the Apostles, holding that during the Reformation, the Church of Rome fell away. The Augsburg Confession found within the Book of Concord, a compendium of belief of the Lutheran Churches, teaches that "the faith as confessed by Luther and his followers is nothing new, but the true Catholic faith, and that their churches represent the true catholic or universal church". When the Lutherans presented the Augsburg Confession to Charles V, Holy Roman Emperor in 1530, they believe to have "showed that each article of faith and practice was true first of all to Holy Scripture, and then also to the teaching of the church fathers and the councils".

Lutheran theology therefore holds that:

There can only be one true visible Church. Of this our Catechism speaks in Question 192: "Whom do we call the true visible Church?" Answer: "The whole number of those who have, teach and confess the entire doctrine of the Word of God in all its purity, and among whom the Sacraments are duly administered according to Christ's institution." That there can be but one true visible Church, and that, therefore, one is not just as good as another stands to reason because there is only one truth, one Bible, one Word of God. Evidently that Church which teaches this truth, the whole truth, and nothing but the truth, is the true visible Church. Christ says John 8, 31. 32: "If ye continue in My Word, then are ye My disciples indeed; and ye shall know the truth, and the truth shall make you free." Again Christ says Matt. 28, 20: "Teaching them to observe all things whatsoever I have commanded you." Whatsoever He has commanded us, His Word, and nothing else, we should teach. And again, all things which He has commanded us we should teach. That, therefore is the true visible Church which does this. But that all visible Churches do not this is plain from the fact that they do not agree among themselves. If every Church would teach the whole truth and nothing but the truth as God has revealed it, there could be no difference. So, then, by calling other denominations Churches, we do not mean to say that one Church is just as good as another. Only that one is the true visible Church which teaches and confesses the entire doctrine of the Word of God in all its purity, and in whose midst the Sacraments are duly administered according to Christ's institution. Of all Churches, this can only be said of our Lutheran Church.

Laestadian Lutherans, in particular, emphasize this belief.

In the Lutheran churches, the "Office of the Keys is the special authority which Christ has given to His Church on earth: to forgive the sins of the penitent sinners, but to retain the sins of the impenitent as long as they do not repent." Lutheran doctrine cites John 20:22–23 as the basis for the sacrament of Confession and Absolution.

=== Baptists ===
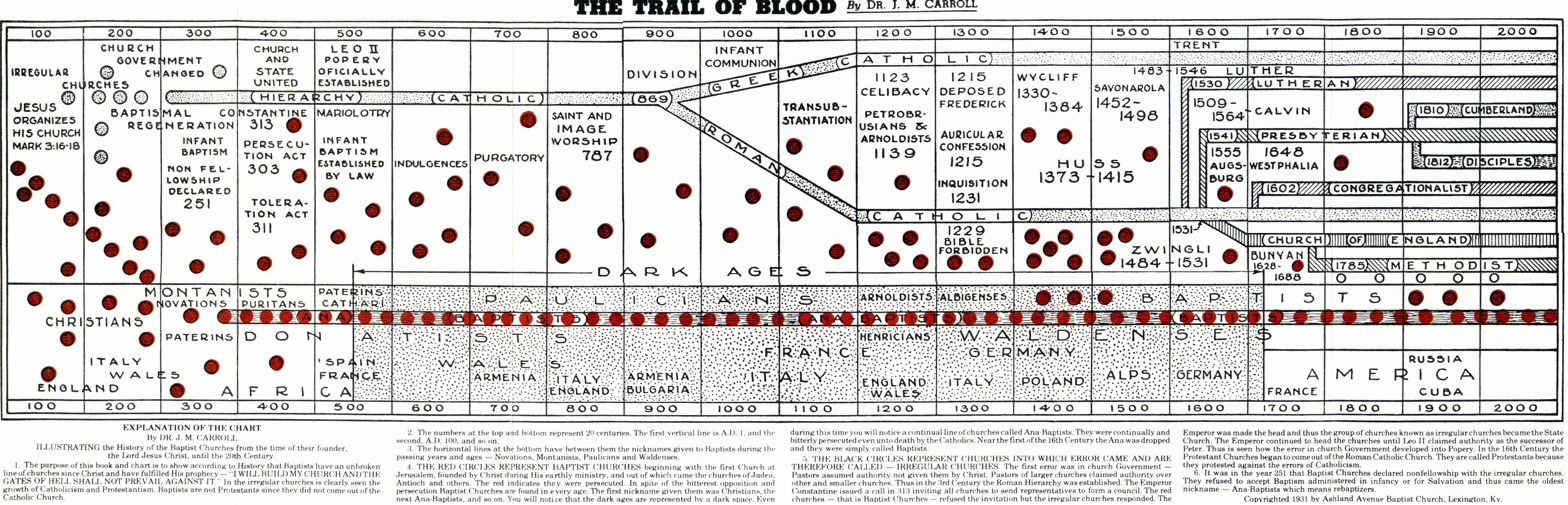
Graph from The Trail of Blood, a popular Baptist book that teaches the doctrine of Baptist successionism.

Many Baptists, who uphold the doctrine of Baptist successionism (also known as Landmarkism), "argue that their history can be traced across the centuries to New Testament times" and "claim that Baptists have represented the true church" that "has been, present in every period of history". These Baptists maintain that those who held their views throughout history, including the "Montanists, Novatians, Patarenes, Bogomils, Paulicians, Arnoldists, Henricians, Albigenses, and Waldenses", were persecuted for their faith, a belief that these Baptists maintain to be "grand distinguishing mark of the true church". In the introduction of The Trail of Blood, a Baptist text that explicates the doctrine of Baptist succession, Clarence Walker states that "The history of Baptists, he discovered, was written in blood. They were the hated people of the Dark Ages. Their preachers and people were put into prison and untold numbers were put to death." J. M. Carroll, the author of the said text The Trail of Blood, also appeals to historian Johann Lorenz von Mosheim, who stated "Before the rise of Luther and Calvin, there lay secreted in almost all the countries of Europe persons who adhered tenaciously to the principles of modern Dutch Baptists." Walter B. Shurden, the founding executive director of the Center for Baptist Studies at Mercer University, writes that the theology of Landmarkism, which he states is integral of the history of the Southern Baptist Convention, upholds the ideas that "Only Baptist churches can trace their lineage in uninterrupted fashion back to the New Testament, and only Baptist churches therefore are true churches." In addition Shurden writes that Baptists who uphold successionism believe that "only a true church-that is, a Baptist church-can legitimately celebrate the ordinances of baptism and the Lord's Supper. Any celebration of these ordinances by non-Baptists is invalid."

Baptists who uphold this ecclesiology also do not characterize themselves as being a Protestant church due to their belief that "they did not descend from those churches that broke away in protest from the church of Rome. Rather, they had enjoyed a continuous historical existence from the time of the very first church in the New Testament days." These views are generally no longer widely held in the Southern Baptist Convention although they are still taught by some Southern Baptist Churches and many independent Baptist churches, Primitive Baptists (Reformed Baptists), and some "congregations affiliated with the American Baptist Association."

=== Anabaptists ===
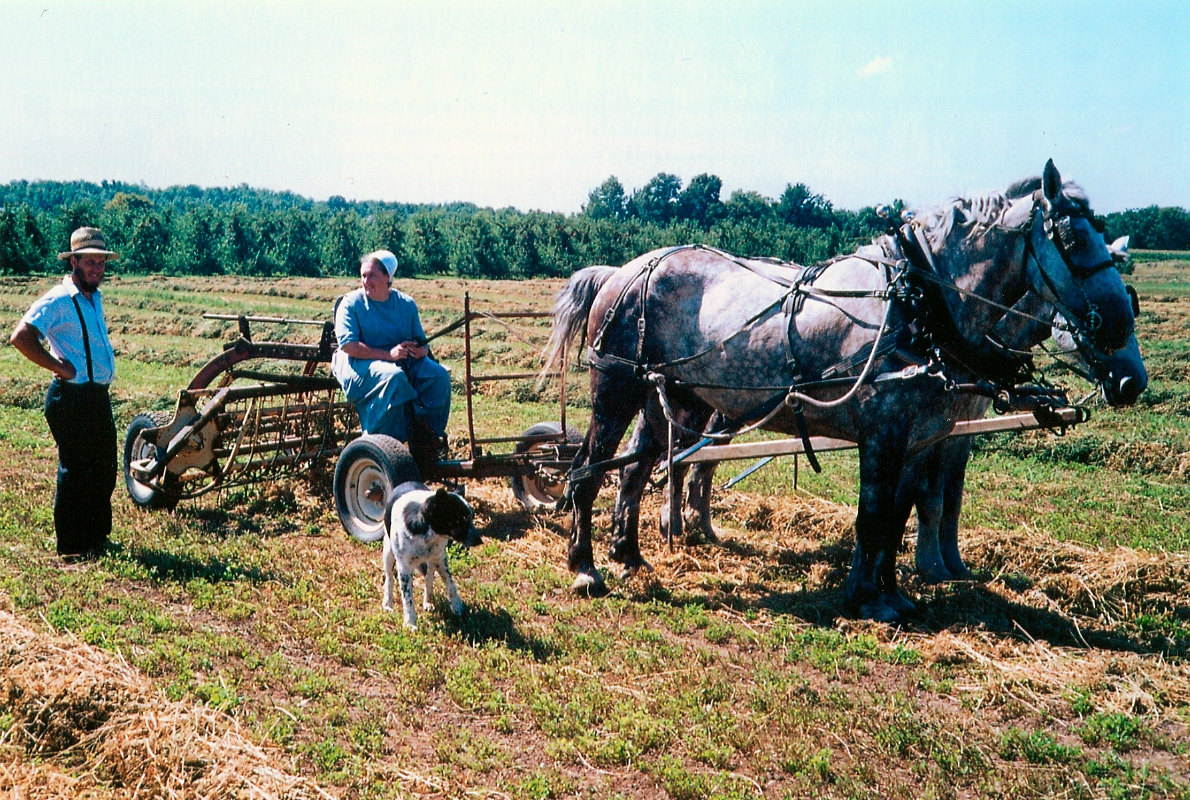
An Amish family in Lyndonville, New York.

==== Amish ====
The Amish, as with other Anabaptist Christians, believe that "the established church became corrupt, ineffectual, and displeasing to God." The Amish believe that the true church is pure and separate from the world:

Amish fraternity is based upon the understanding of the church as a redemptive community. To express this corporateness they use the German term Gemeinde or the shorter dialect version pronounced Gemee. This concept expresses all the connotations of church, congregation, and community. The true church, they believe, had its origin in God's plan, and after the end of time the church will coexist with God through eternity. The true church is to be distinguished from the "fallen church". ... The church of God is composed of those who "have truly repented and rightly believed; who are rightly baptized ... and incorporated into the communion of saints on earth." The true church is "a chosen generation, a royal priesthood, an holy nation," and "a congregation of the righteous." The church of God is separate and completely different from the "bind perverted world." Furthermore, the church is "known by her evangelical faith, doctrine, love, and godly conversation; also by her pure walk and practice, and her observances of the true ordinances of Christ." The church must be "pure, unspotted and without blemish" (Eph. 5:27), capable of enforcing disciplinary measures to insure purity of life and separation from the world.

==== Church of God in Christ (Mennonite) ====
The Church of God in Christ, Mennonite teaches that their Church is the one true church. Anabaptist theologian Donald Kraybill writes:

Although similar in some ways to other conservative Mennonite groups, the Holdeman church teaches that they are the one true church of Christ. Their doctrine of the one true church, based on Matthew 16:18 and other Scriptures, emphasizes the succession of true doctrine, practice, and teachers through the centuries, and the authority of the church under Christ.

The Martyr's Mirror by Thieleman Van Braght is often quoted as a source for this assertion, giving 1200 pages of evidence in favour of this belief.

=== Quakers ===
As described in the tract The Glory of the True Church by Francis Howgill, the Religious Society of Friends traditionally believed that after the Apostolic Era, the "true Church fled into the wilderness" and "the false Church came into visibility". George Fox and his followers "believed that they were called to carry out the true reformation, to restore apostolic Christianity, and to make a fresh beginning". As such, "The Quaker community was the one true Church, and consequently those converted by Quaker preaching were expected to join it." Among some Quakers, there became a "shift from being the one and only True Church to being a part of the True Church" and so "marriage with non-Quakers became accepted by many in the Quaker community", though "they still had to marry within the Meeting House, as well as gain approbation."

=== Methodism ===
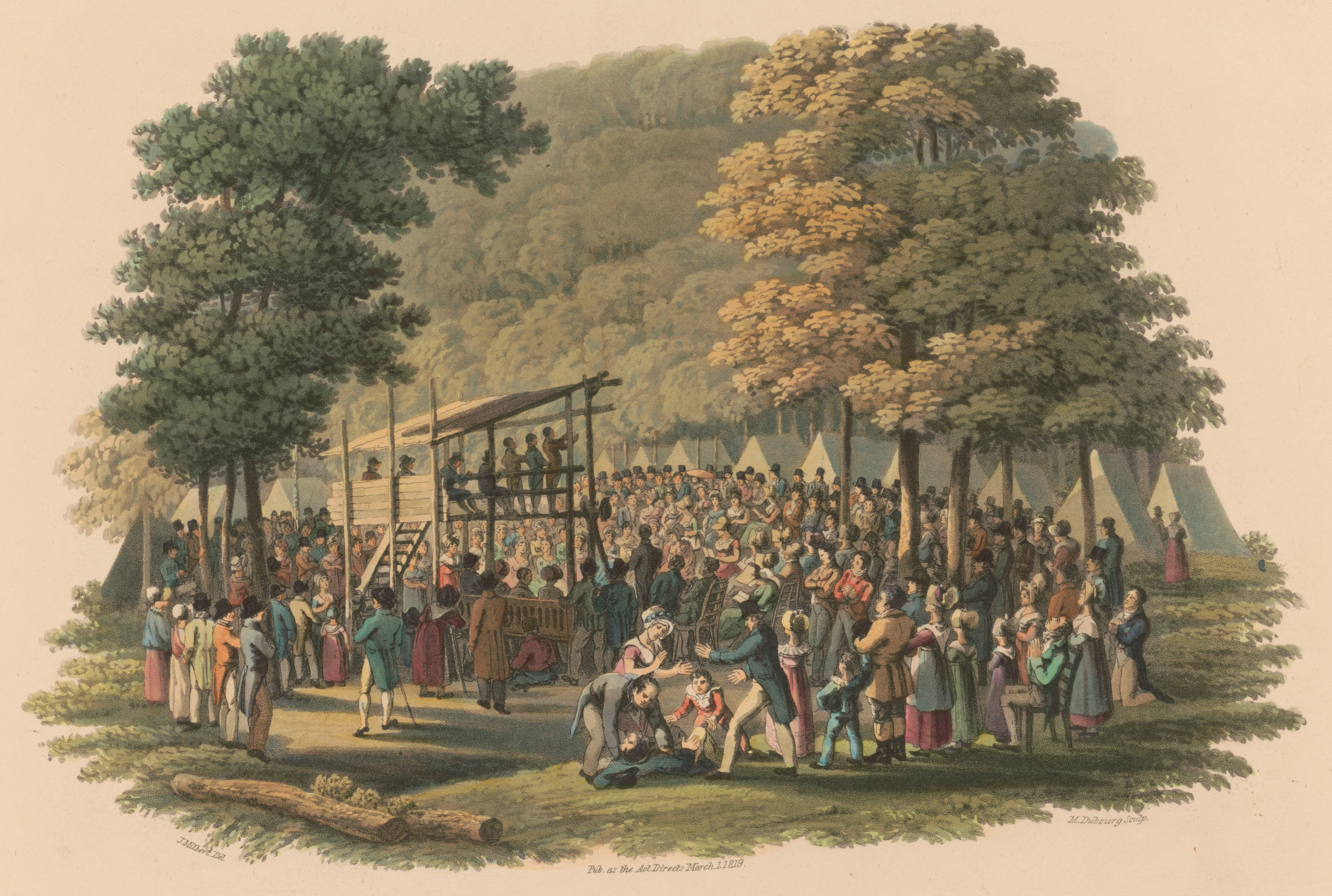
Methodist preachers are known for promulgating the doctrines of the new birth and entire sanctification to the public at events such as tent revivals and camp meetings, which they believe is the reason that God raised them up into existence.

Methodists affirm belief in "the one true Church, Apostolic and Universal", viewing their churches as constituting a "privileged branch of this true church". With regard to the position of Methodism within Christendom, the founder of the movement "John Wesley once noted that what God had achieved in the development of Methodism was no mere human endeavor but the work of God. As such it would be preserved by God so long as history remained." Calling it "the grand depositum" of the Methodist faith, Wesley specifically taught that the propagation of the doctrine of entire sanctification was the reason that God raised up the Methodists in the world.

=== Restorationism ===
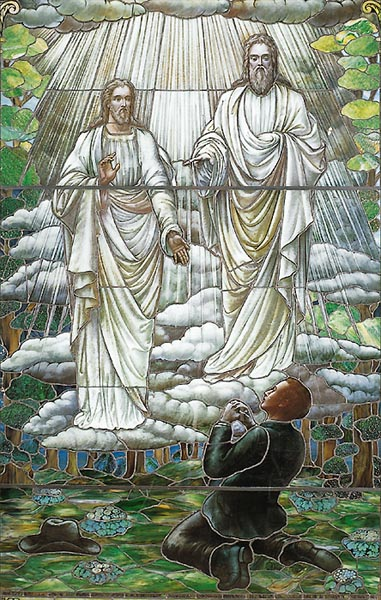
A stained glass depiction of Joseph Smith's First Vision. He said that Jesus and God the Father told him that all the churches of his day were corrupt and abominable.

Restorationism is a broad category of churches, originating during the Second Great Awakening, that characterize themselves as a return to very early Christianity after the true faith was lost in a Great Apostasy. Prominent among these groups are the Christian churches and churches of Christ, the Churches of Christ (Stone-Campbell movement), the Christadelphians, the International Bible Students, the Jehovah's Witnesses, and the Latter Day Saint movement (Mormonism). The idea of "restoration" was a popular theme of the time of the founding of these branches, and developed an independent expression in both. In the Stone-Campbell movement, the idea of restoration was combined with Enlightenment rationalism, "precluding emotionalism, spiritualism, or any other phenomena that could not be sustained by rational appeals to the biblical text."

==== Seventh-Day Adventist ====
The Seventh-Day Adventist Church (SDA Church) Is considered by some to be the only true church, but Ellen G. White, prophet of the church claimed herself that people of other Denominations will be saved. It specifically teaches that "it is the 'final remnant' of His true church [spanning] the centuries". Seventh-day Adventist eschatology promulgates the idea that in the end times, there will be a "growing opposition between the 'true' church and the 'apostate' church." According to Seventh-day Adventist theology, these apostates are referred to as "Babylon", which they state is an amalgam of religions (including other Christian denominations) that worship on Sunday rather than the Lord's Sabbath, Saturday (Exodus 20:8–11). The SDA Church, in their view, "has drawn substantially on the biblical text, especially the books of Daniel and Revelation, to argue for its own status as the true remnant church which has a divine commission both to exist and to preach its apocalyptic message to the world at large."

==== Christian Conventions ====
Some small episcopal church groups, such as the "Workers and Friends", represent themselves as nondenominational and hold all other churches to be false.

==== Jehovah's Witnesses ====
Originating from the Bible Student Movement under Charles Taze Russell, the Jehovah's Witnesses were founded under Joseph Franklin Rutherford, who, after a presidency dispute, was recognized as the second president of the Watch Tower and Tract Society of Pennsylvania, the official publishing company and organization of the Bible Students, first founded in 1881.

In 1938, Rutherford introduced what he called a theocratic (literally, God-ruled) organizational system. The Organization since the time of Rutherford, has long laid claim to being "Jehovah's one and only true Organization". Since that time the Organization claimed it was led or guided by a class of 144,000 "anointed Christians", who collectively were known to be the "Faithful and Discreet Slave" and that they were "represented" by the Organization's leading group known as the Governing Body, which has claimed that since 1919 they have been operating under the direct control of Jesus Christ to exercise teaching authority in all matters pertaining to doctrine and articles of faith when Jesus was said to have "appointed his 'Slave' over his 'Domestics'" after his "Invisible Presence" or "Parousia" in the year 1914.

Since 2012 the Jehovah's Witnesses Governing Body have laid exclusive claim to being "Jehovah God's Faithful and Discreet Slave" and stated that the other Christians of the 144,000 Anointed Class are no longer considered to be a part of that group.

They maintain their position to the present day that salvation can only be found in the Organization of the Jehovah's Witnesses.

==== Latter Day Saint movement ====
In 1830, Joseph Smith established the Church of Christ in the belief that it was a restoration of original Christianity. In 1831 he declared it to be "the only true and living church upon the face of the whole earth". Smith later reported in some versions of his First Vision in his teenage years, Jesus had told him that all churches that then existed "were all wrong; [and] that all their creeds were an abomination in his sight". The Latter Day Saints combined their religion with "the spirit of nineteenth-century Romanticism" and, as a result, "never sought to recover the forms and structures of the ancient church as ends in themselves" but "sought to restore the golden age, recorded in both Old Testament and New Testament, when God broke into human history and communed directly with humankind."

The predominant organization within the movement is the LDS Church, which continues to teach that it is "the only true and living church upon the face of the whole earth". The church teaches that all people who achieve the highest level of salvation must be baptized by one who holds the proper authority to perform such an ordinance; however, those who missed that opportunity in their lifetime may be included through a proxy baptism for the dead, in which a church member is baptized on their behalf inside a temple.

Most other Latter Day Saint churches claim to be the rightful continuation or successor of the church Smith established and therefore claim to be the one true church. However, the Community of Christ, the second-largest Latter Day Saint church, has recently de-emphasized this belief in favor of a position that the Community of Christ "is part of the whole body of Christ". The church's canonized Doctrine and Covenants continues to contain the declaration that the church is the "only true and living church".

==== Iglesia ni Cristo ====
The Iglesia ni Cristo (INC) a Philippine-based Christian religion, like other restorationist groups, professes that it is the one church founded by Jesus. Adherents hold that the Iglesia ni Cristo ("Church of Christ" in Tagalog) is the only true church of Jesus Christ as restored through a human instrument (sugo) Felix Manalo. The church recognizes Jesus Christ as the founder of the Christian Church. Meanwhile, its reestablishment is seen as the signal for the end of days. They believe that the church was apostatized by the 1st or 4th century due to false teachings. The INC says that this apostate church is the Roman Catholic Church.

Fear not for I am with you; I will bring your descendants from the east, And gather you from the west; I will say to the north, 'Give them up!' And to the south, 'Do not keep them back!' Bring My sons from afar, And My daughters from the ends of the earth.

— Isaiah 43:5–6

Members believe that the Iglesia ni Cristo is the fulfillment of the passage above. Based from their doctrines, "ends of the earth" pertains to the time the true church would be restored from apostasy and "east" refers to the Philippines where the "Church of Christ" would be founded. The INC teaches that its members constitute the "elect of God" and there is no salvation outside the INC. Faith alone is insufficient for salvation. The Iglesia ni Cristo says that the official name of the true church is "Church of Christ". The two passages often cited by INC to support this are Romans 16:16 "Greet one another with a holy kiss. All the churches of Christ greet you" and the George Lamsa translation of Acts 20:28: "Take heed therefore ... to feed the church of Christ which he has purchased with his blood."

==== Shincheonji Church of Jesus ====
Shincheonji Church of Jesus, the Temple of the Tabernacle of the Testimony (SCJ), commonly known as Shincheonji Church of Jesus or simply Shincheonji (Korean: 신천지; Hanja: 新天地; lit. 'New Heaven and New Earth'; IPA: [ɕintɕʰʌndʑi]), is a Abrahamic monotheistic new religious movement established in South Korea by Lee Man-hee in 1984.

Shincheonji's teaching claims that their chairman, Lee Man Hee, is the pastor promised in the New Testament, and that the Book of Revelation was written in secret parables whose meaning was revealed to Chairman Lee by God. Shincheonji teaches that it is the one true religion, with its members receiving salvation at the Last Judgment. Its adherents believe everyone not in the group will be denied forgiveness and destroyed.

The group's founder and leader is variously referred to by church followers as "Chairman Lee (이 총회장)"; "the Chairman (회장)"; "the Promised Pastor (약속의 목자)"; "the One who Overcomes (이긴자)"; or "the Advocate (대언자)." Adherents believe Lee is the successor to Jesus Christ, and as having the unique ability to interpret the Book of Revelation. The group also believes in the times of fulfillment of New Testament prophecies, the most pious 144,000 adherents of the church will enjoy salvation and eternal life as promised in Revelation 7.

== See also ==
- Extra Ecclesiam nulla salus
- Fate of the unlearned
- Great Church
- Marks of the Church (Protestantism)
- Religious exclusivism
