= Calmes =

Calmes is a surname. Notable people with the surname include:

- Albert Calmes (1881–1967), Luxembourgish economist and historian
- Carole Calmes (born 1978), Luxembourgish sports shooter
- Christian Calmes (1913–1995), Luxembourgish civil servant, lawyer and historian
- Elisabeth Calmes (born 1947), Luxembourgish painter
- Emile Calmes (born 1954), Luxembourgish politician
- Jack Calmes (1943–2015), American inventor, executive and musician
- Keith Calmes (born 1966), American guitarist, educator, composer and author
- Marquis Calmes (1755–1834), American military leader
- Selma Calmes (born 1940), American anesthesiologist and physician
- William Calmes Buck (1790–1872), American Baptist minister, author and editor and commentator on slavery
