= Baptist successionism =

Theory of continuous nonconformist Christian Church

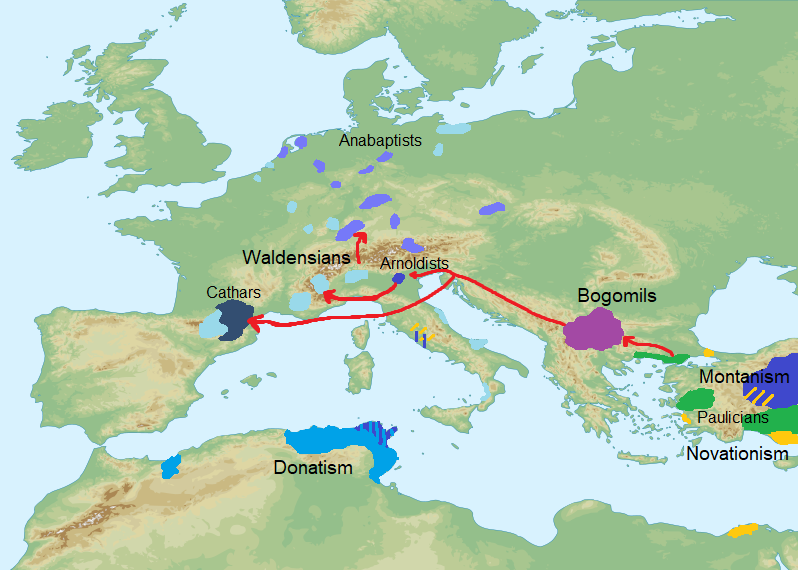
Baptist successionism as laid out by James Milton Carroll. Other sects are sometimes included in the theory.

Baptist successionism (or Baptist perpetuity) is a controversial theory about the origins of the Baptist tradition. The theory postulates an unbroken lineage of churches (since the days of John the Baptist or the Book of Acts) which have held beliefs similar to those of current Baptists. Groups often included in this lineage include the Montanists, Paulicians, Paterines, Cathari, Waldenses, Albigenses, and Anabaptists. However, there is variation within successionist theories, particularly in the inclusion of Messalianism, Jovinianism, alongside some Lollards and Hussites.

This view today is held mostly by fundamentalist and some conservative Baptists, and was historically associated with writers such as John Spittlehouse (1652), Jesse Mercer (1769–1841), Charles Spurgeon (1834 – 1892), and James Milton Carroll (1852 – 1931) among some others.

Modern scholarship and even most Baptists today label the theory as being pseudohistorical, without sufficient historical support.

== Theory ==
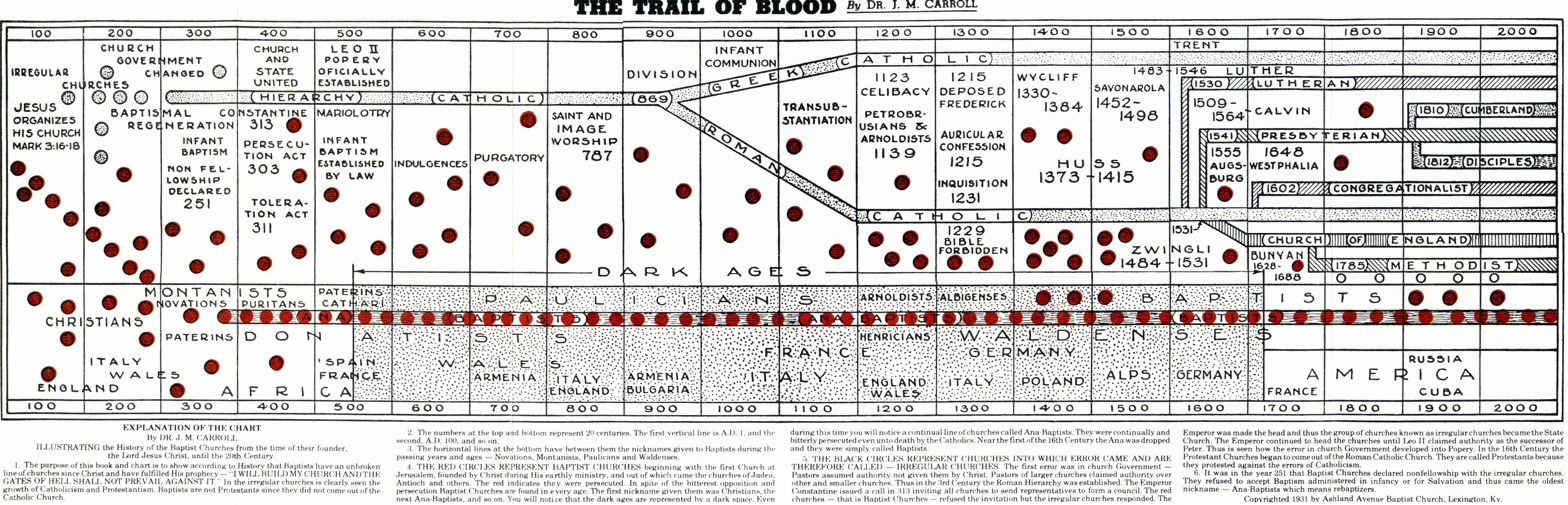
Diagram representing The Trail of Blood as presented by James Milton Carroll

The theory proposes that Baptists have an unbroken lineage from the early Church, while claiming that over time bishops or presbyters started to assume more authority which led to the birth of the Roman Catholic Church and to theological errors.

Groups often included in the succession line are Montanists, Novationists, Donatists, Paulicians, Pataria, Cathars, Waldenses, Petrobrusians, Arnoldists, Henricians, and Anabaptists. Some variations include Messalianism and factions of Hussitism and Lollardism within the claimed succession.

Supporters of the theory argue that groups such as Bogomils, Paulicians, or Cathars were Baptist in doctrine instead of Gnostic; with, for example, Berlin Hisel arguing that many charges put towards Bogomils were false, although Baptist successionists may still grant that not everybody inside these sects held to the same views as modern Baptists.

However Baptist historians such as Thomas Armitage have held to a model of Baptist history which did not advocate for visible institutional succession of Baptist churches, while still arguing for the existence of Baptist principles throughout history. Despite rejecting their affiliations with Gnosticism, he still denied the inclusion of groups such as the Cathars, Paulicians and Bogomils as proto-Baptists, instead arguing that they were closer to modern Quakerism. However, he still held that groups such as the Petrobrusians, Henricans, Waldensians held to Baptist principles in their views, alongside praising early Christian theologians such as Jovinian, Helvidius, Aerius of Sebaste and Vigilantius. Thomas Armitage also drew parallels between Montanism and Baptists, such as by the principles of regenerate church membership, although still stating that there are significant differences.

=== Montanism ===
Montanism is the first and earliest group included in the successionist theory. Montanism has been generally associated as being a charismatic group that emphasized personal revelation, which also sought to establish a more conservative personal ethic. However, Berlin Hisel, a proponent of Baptist successionism argued that Eusebius' (265 – 339) portrayal of Montanism is questionable, claiming that he had no firsthand sources on Montanism. Although conceding that some of the Montanists may have held aberrant views, he still held that Montanism was largely an early Baptist movement. Citing the Baptist historian, Henry C. Vedder (who himself was critical of successionism), Baptist successionists have argued that due to the principle of the regenerate church taught by Montanism necessitates that they would have taught believer's baptism.

=== Novatians ===
The Novatians were an early Christian sect that emerged in the third century. The Novatians were among the first groups included by James Milton Carroll in his The Trail of Blood, whom he argued to represent an ancient form of Baptist theology. Berlin Hisel, argued that the Novatians practiced believer's baptism and emphasized church discipline similarly to modern Baptist groups. However, the evidence for the Novatians being credobaptists has been called "weak" by some historians, as Augustine’s accounts and other sources do not explicitly support this view in a robust manner.

=== Donatism ===
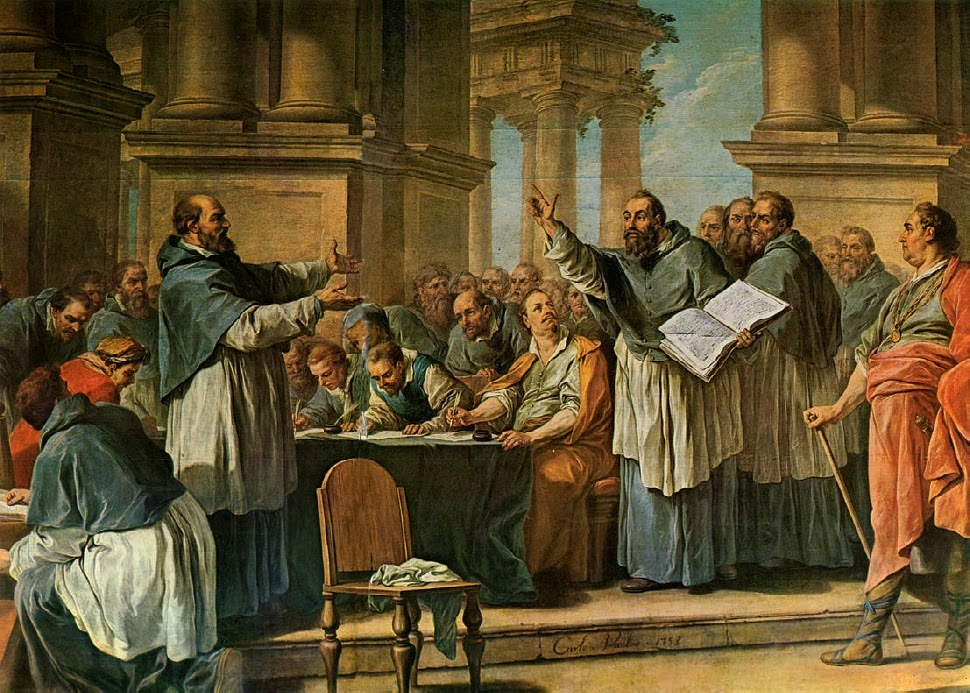
Charles-André van Loo's 18th-century Augustine arguing with Donatists

Baptist successionists often include Donatism as a part of the theory, arguing that Donatists taught the doctrines of saved church membership, believer's baptism and separation of church and state. The Baptist successionist Hisel Berlin, argued that Donatist statements concerning the practice of rebaptism should be viewed evidence of them practicing credobaptism.

The Baptist historian David Benedict in 1875 wrote a book called "History of the Donatists", where he argued that the Donatists were congregational in their church government and rejected infant baptism. However, Dr. Heman Lincoln although rejecting the claim of David Benedict that the Donatists were fully Baptist, still argued that they held many similar principles to the Baptists such as liberty of conscience, liberty of religion and regenerate church membership. The Baptist successionist John T Christian believed that although some of the Donatists placed too much stress on the efficiency of baptism and even accepting the episcopal polity, that they were still reflective of Baptists.

However these conclusions have been criticized, instead understanding the statements of rebaptism to refer to the claim that only Donatists could offer regeneration in Baptism, thus rebaptizing converts from non-Donatist groups so that they would be saved from hell.

=== Paulicians and Bogomils ===
Paulicianism was a sect in the Eastern Church which was started by a preacher named Constantine. As with Montanism, Baptist successionists dispute charges made against the Paulicians and Bogomils, including claims that they rejected the writings of Peter the Apostle and the Old Testament. Hisel Berlin argued that the Paulicians upheld an orthodox view of the Trinity and contended that many of the charges against them were unreliable, as the primary sources were written by their opponents. Hisel also suggested that the Paulicians practiced believer's baptism, a belief he claimed for them to share with the Bogomils. The Baptist historian Thomas Armitage argued that the witness of Photius on the Paulicians was inaccurate, and that there were many classes of Paulicians, whom Photius and Siculus lumped wrongly together and misinterpreted their views, however he denied them as Baptists due to their denial of water baptism. However, Hisel claimed that the charges of rejecting baptism were likely false accusations, which he saw as referring to a rejection of infant baptism and triple-immersion, which he argues could have been taken as rejection of baptism itself by the opponents of Bogomilism.

=== Arnoldists ===
Hisel made the case that the Arnoldists were Baptist in doctrine, as evidence the Lateran council is quoted where Arnold of Brescia was condemned for rejecting infant baptism and for the rejection of transubstantiation. A direct connection with Arnoldists and Waldensians was also claimed to support succession, a direct link was also argued with Arnoldists and Petro-Brussians.

=== Waldensians ===
The Waldensians, a medieval Christian movement of the 12th century, were identified by Hisel as having connections to the Albigenses. He claimed that the two groups shared a common origin with similar doctrinal beliefs, including the rejection of paedobaptism and a focus on personal faith. This connection was presented as part of the broader argument for Baptist succession, linking the Waldensians to other medieval groups like the Cathars.

=== Cathars ===
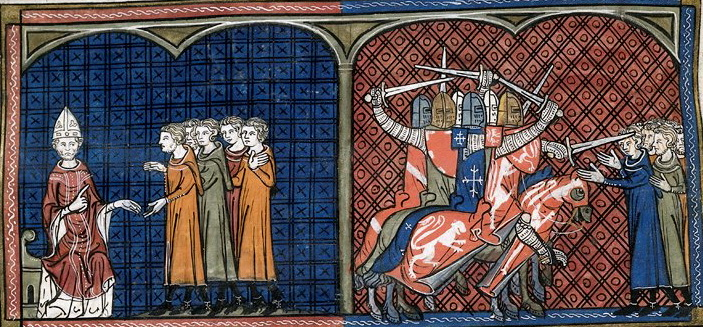
Pope Innocent III excommunicating the Albigensians (left), massacre of the Albigensians by the crusaders (right)

The Cathars or Albigenses, a medieval group generally argued to be dualistic, were often accused of rejecting marriage and other traditional sacraments within medieval sources. However, Hisel argued that the Cathars’ supposed rejection of marriage likely referred to their refusal to recognize marriage as a sacrament, rather than a denial of the institution itself. He also suggested that the Cathars rejected infant baptism and the concept of baptismal regeneration, aligning them with other groups seen as part of the Baptist succession.

Claiming the Cathars as pockets of true teaching in the middle ages has also been done by some Reformed writers, such as Jean Duvernoy and John Foxe. Magisterial Protestants and Baptists successionists who have attempted to claim Cathars as their precursors have historically denied any charges of dualism on the Cathars as simply hostile claims. The Cathar views on dualism are against Roman Catholic, Baptist and Reformed teachings. Protestant historians such as Jacques Basnage, Mosheim and Shroeck have insisted that the charges of dualism and docetism were not authentic, only hostile claims, with such arguments being criticized by Charles Schmidt.

Arguments against Catharic dualism were the following: there were possibly other neo-Manichean dualists in the Middle Ages, but they were not Cathars; that it was a misinterpration of their theology because they denied religious hierarchy set by man or that the accusation of their dualism was merely a hostile false claim. However each argument has been called "unconvincing" by critics.

=== Lollards ===
Although Lollardy was not included in The Trail of Blood, Charles Spurgeon (an advocate of successionism) claimed that John Wycliffe and some of the Lollard movement was opposed to the practice of infant baptism.

=== Anabaptists ===
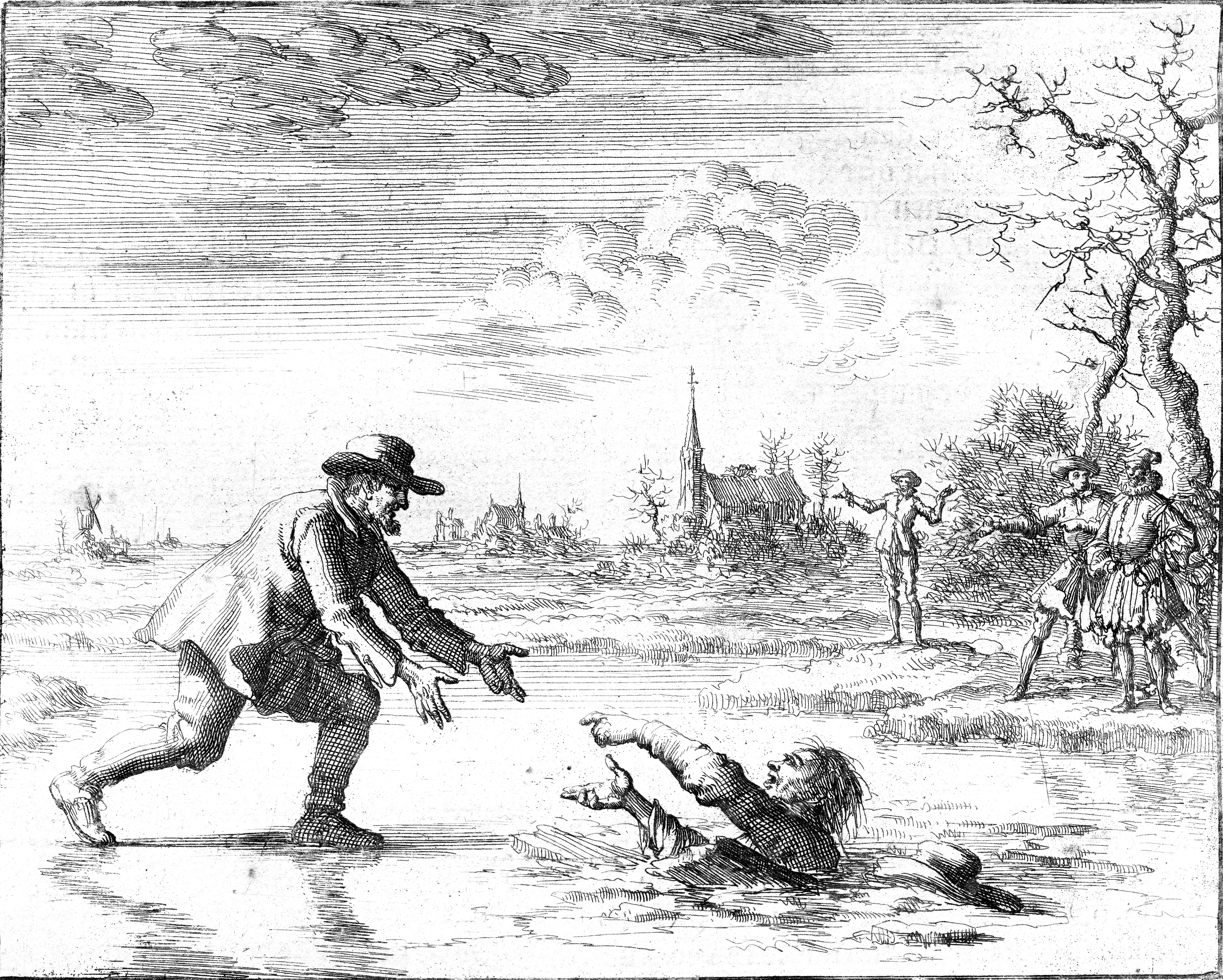
A 1685 illustration by Jan Luyken, published in Martyrs Mirror, of Dirk Willems saving his pursuer, an act of mercy that led to his recapture, after which he was burned at the stake near Asperen in the present-day Netherlands

In The Trail of Blood, James Milton Carroll argued that Baptists descended from the Anabaptist movement of the 16th century. In the Baptist History Notebook, Hisel drew on historical accounts, including those of the Lutheran historian Johann Lorenz von Mosheim (1693 – 1755), to argue for a succession of Baptist-like groups throughout history. Mosheim wrote: "The true origin of that sect which acquired the denomination of Anabaptists by their administering anew the rite of baptism to those who came over to their communion, and derived that of Mennonites from the famous man to whom they owe the greatest part of their present felicity, is hidden in the depths of antiquity, and is, of consequence, extremely difficult to be ascertained." Hisel interpreted this statement as giving credit to the idea that the Anabaptists were connected to earlier similar groups, such as the Waldensians, forming a continuous tradition of believer’s baptism and opposition to paedobaptism.

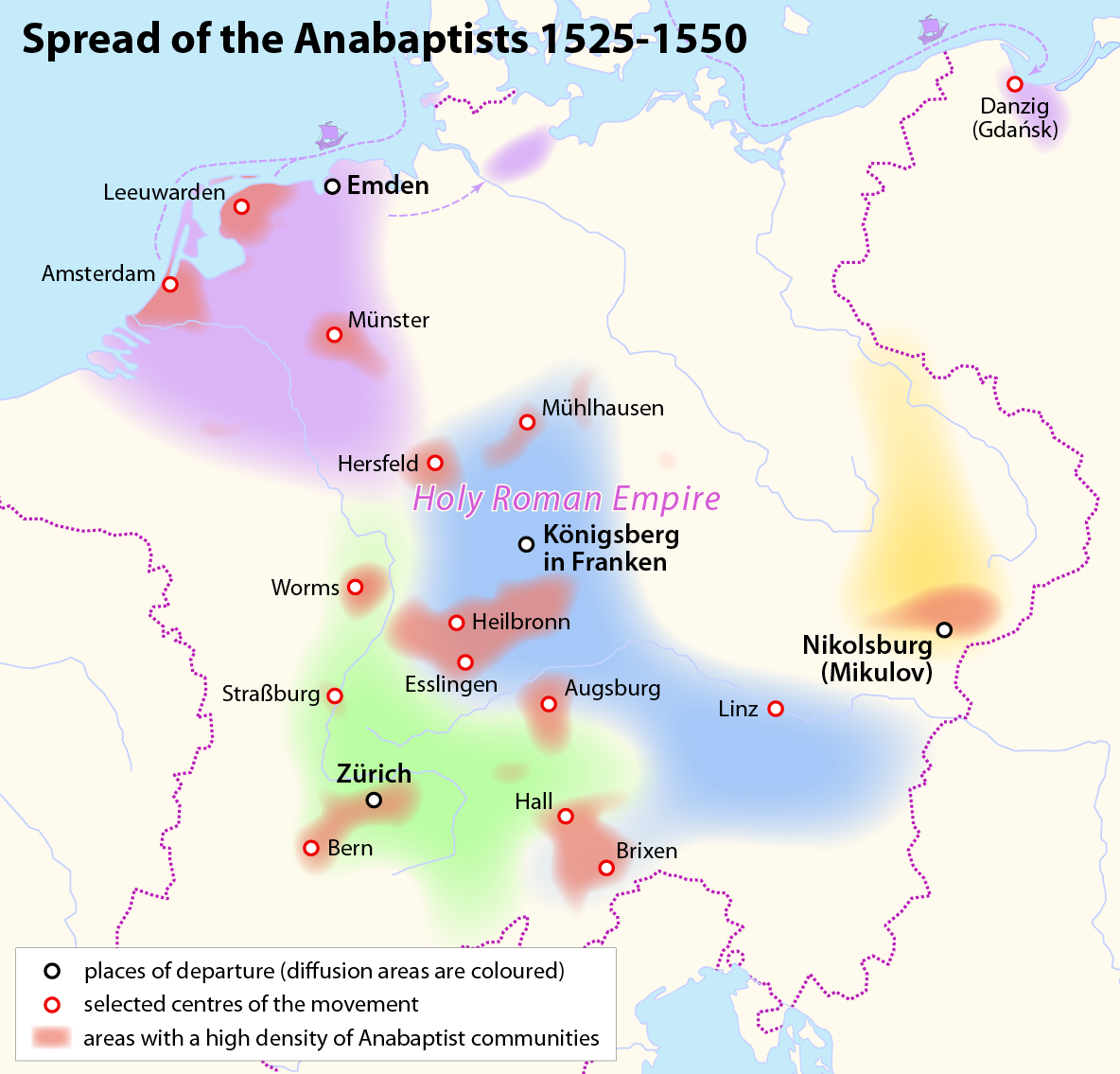
Spread of the Anabaptists 1525-1550

The view that the Baptist movement is an outgrowth of the Anabaptist movement is a central claim of the Baptist successionist advocates only held by some conservative Baptists. However, some other historians who do not believe in Baptist successionism, although holding a minority view, believe that early 17th century Baptists were influenced by (but not directly connected to) continental Anabaptists. According to this view, the General Baptists shared similarities with Dutch Waterlander Mennonites (one of many Anabaptist groups) including believer's baptism only, religious liberty, separation of church and state, and Arminian views of predestination and original sin. It is certain that the early Baptist church led by Smyth had contacts with the Anabaptists; however it is debated if these influences found their way into the English General Baptists.

Representatives of this theory include A.C. Underwood and William R. Estep. Gourley writes that among some contemporary Baptist scholars who emphasize the faith of the community over soul liberty, the Anabaptist influence theory is making a comeback. This view was also taught by the Reformed historian Philip Schaff. However, the relations between Baptists and Anabaptists were early strained. In 1624, the five existing Baptist churches of London issued a condemnation of the Anabaptists. Furthermore, the original group associated with Smyth (popularly believed to be the first Baptists) broke with the Waterlander Mennonite Anabaptists after a brief period of association in the Netherlands.

C. H. Spurgeon argued that there existed an Anabaptist community in England during the 16th century, which was the origin of the English Baptist movement.

== History ==
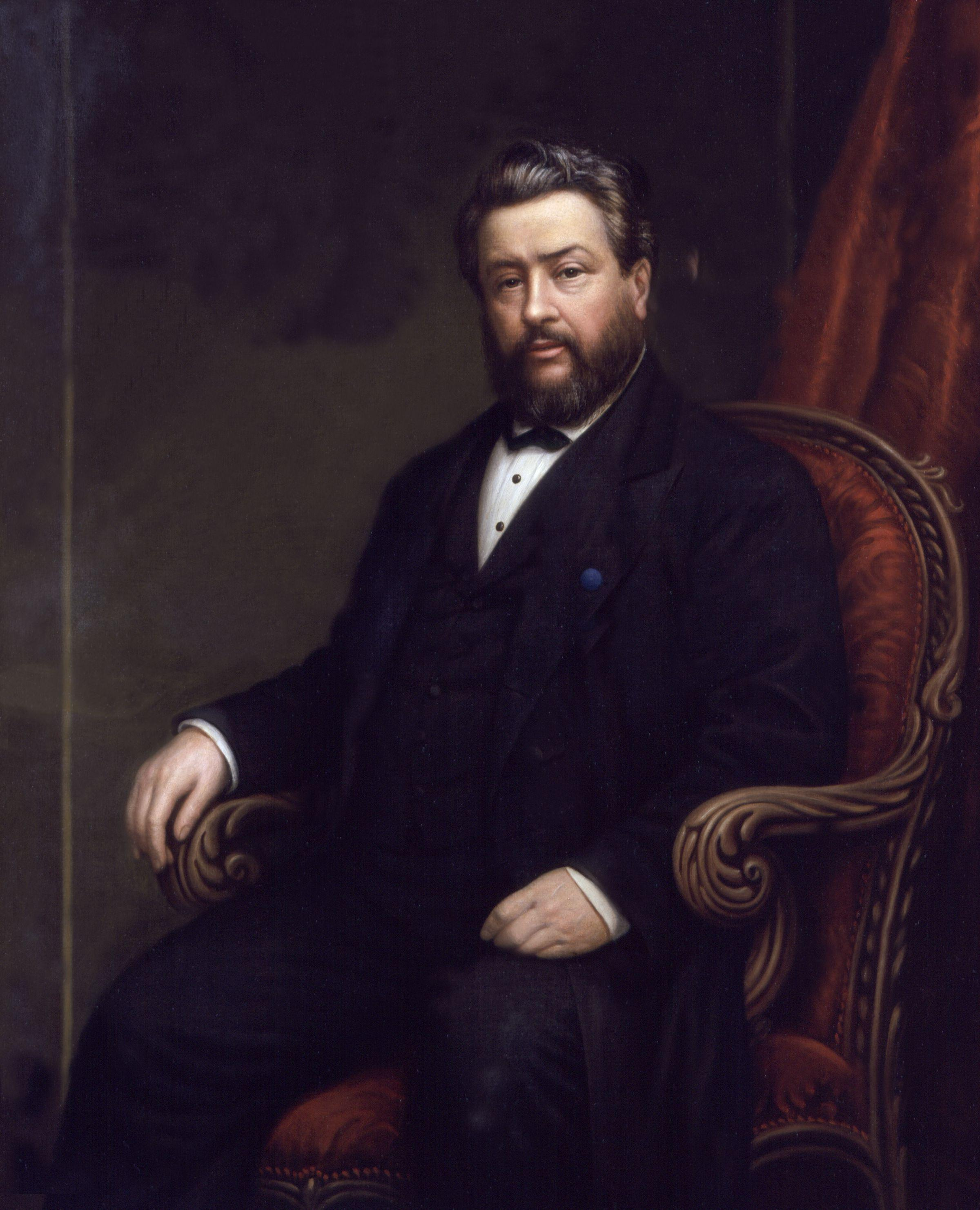
C. H. Spurgeon (1834 – 1892) believed that medieval groups such as the Waldenses, Albigenses, Lollards and Anabaptists represented a primitive form of the Baptist movement.

Baptist successionsim was advocated as early as 1652 by an English Baptist named John Spittlehouse in a book entitled A Vindication of the Continued Succession of the Primitive Church of Jesus Christ (Now Scandalously Termed Anabaptists) from the Apostles Unto This Present Time. Among other early Baptists to defend successionism was the famous English preacher C. H. Spurgeon (1834 – 1892). However, the perpetuity view is most often identified with The Trail of Blood, a pamphlet by James Milton Carroll published in 1931. Other Baptist writers who held the perpetuity view are John T. Christian, Thomas Crosby, G. H. Orchard, J. M. Cramp, William Cathcart, Adam Taylor, D. B. Ray as well as Jesse Mercer, the namesake of Mercer University.

This view was once commonly held among Baptists. Since the end of the 19th century, however, the theory has increasingly come under attack and today has been largely discredited. Nonetheless, the view continued to be the prevailing view among Baptists of the Southern United States into the latter 20th century. It is now identified primarily with Landmarkism, which is upheld by the Independent Fundamental Baptist movement, though not exclusively so. The concept attempts to parallel the Roman Catholic, Eastern Orthodox, Nordic Lutheran and Anglican doctrine of apostolic succession and stands in contrast to the restorationist views of Latter Day Saints and the Stone-Campbell Restoration Movement.

Even within the Independent Baptists, some individuals such as Jack Hyles (1926 – 2001) did not teach Landmarkism/Baptist successionism, although he did teach that the church started in AD 31 when Christ was still alive (and not at Pentecost), and that the Catholic Church was started by the Emperor Constantine in AD 313.

== Contemporary view ==
Since the end of the 19th century the trend in academic Baptist historiography has been away from the successionist viewpoint to the view that modern day Baptists are an outgrowth of 17th-century English Separatism. This shift precipitated a controversy among Southern Baptists which occasioned the forced resignation of William H. Whitsitt, a professor at Southern Baptist Seminary, in 1898 from the seminary for advocating the new view, though his views continued to be taught in the seminary after his departure.

== Critique ==
Fr. Dwight Longenecker writing for Catholic Answers has argued that Baptist successionism is unprovable, being primarily based on theological assertion rather than historical evidence. He states that its advocates too often ignore the heretical views espoused by the groups included in the succession, using only persecution by medieval Catholicism as a polemic.

Baptist successionism has also been critiqued by some Baptists, one example being Fred Anderson (an executive director at the Virginia Baptist Historical Society), who saw Baptist successionism as "fanciful history without factual basis". Today, the majority of Baptists reject the successionism of churches as in The Trail of Blood.

== See also ==
- Anabaptism § Medieval forerunners
- Landmarkism
- Restorationism
- Christadelphians § Other historical groups and individuals with some shared doctrines
- Gospel Hall Assemblies § History
- The Pilgrim Church by Edmund Hamer Broadbent
- Proto-Protestantism
