= Proto-Protestantism =

Precursors to the Protestant Reformation

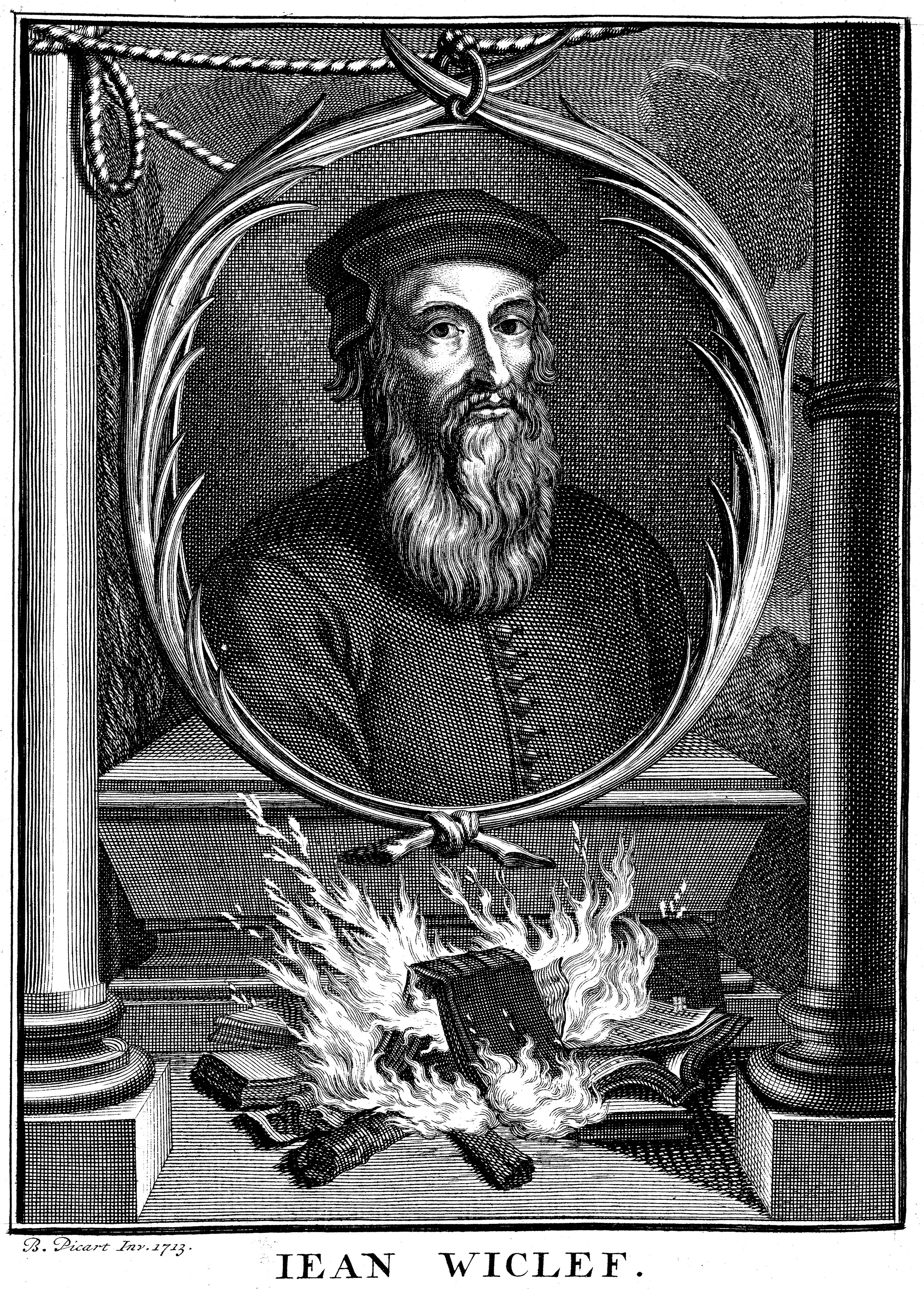
John Wycliffe is called the "Morning Star of the Reformation" by Andy Thomson.

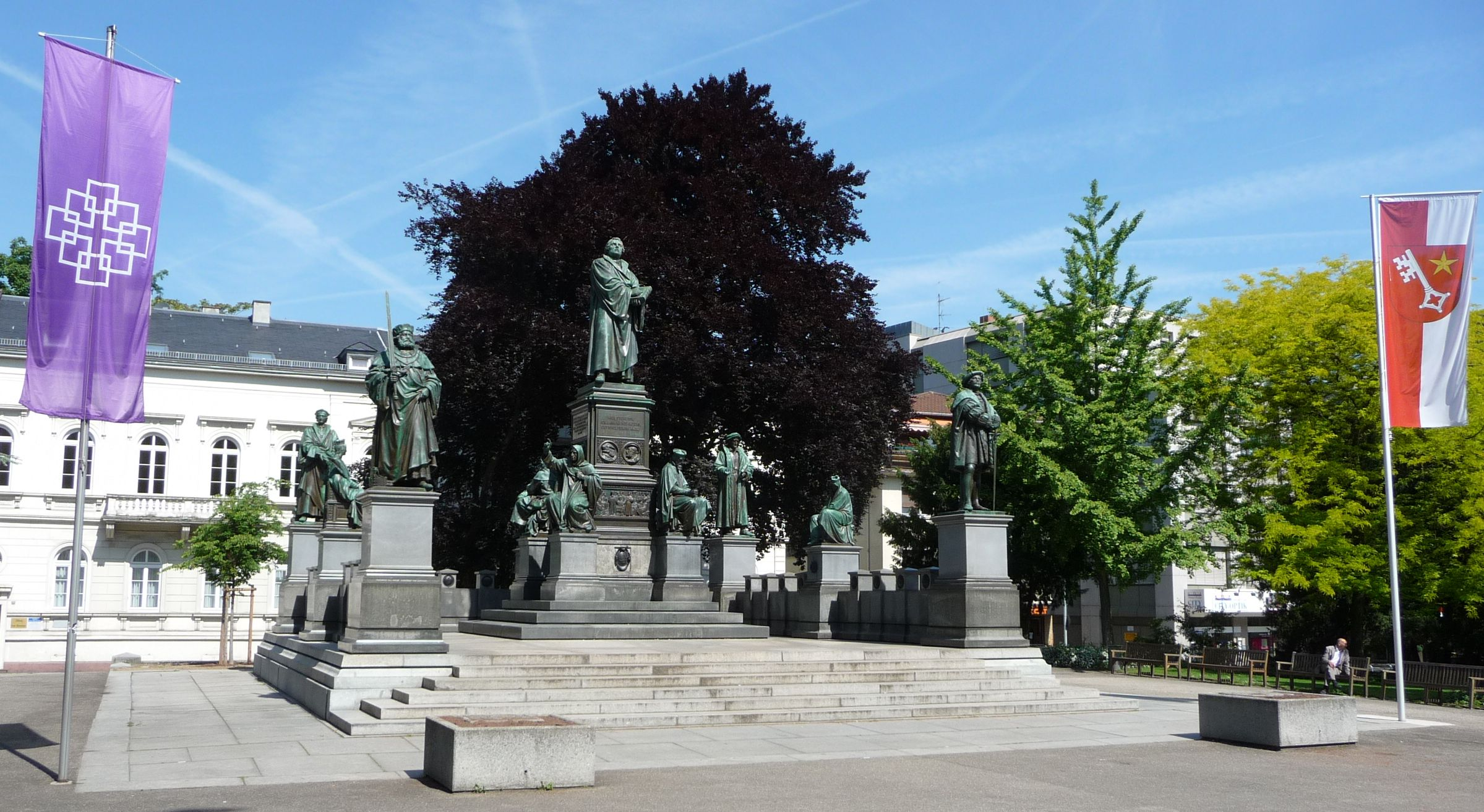
Luther Monument in Worms, including Protestant forerunners such as Girolamo Savonarola, Jan Hus and Peter Waldo

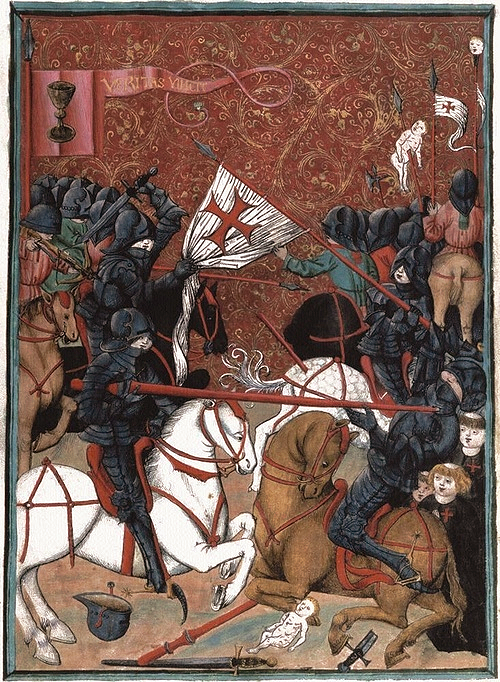
Attempts to suppress the followers of Jan Hus led to launching of several crusades and the Hussite Wars in 1419–1434, culminating in formal recognition of religious freedom in Bohemia.

Proto-Protestantism, also called pre-Protestantism, refers to individuals and movements that propagated various ideas later associated with Protestantism before 1517, which historians usually regard as the starting year for the Reformation era. The relationship between medieval sects and Protestantism is an issue that has been debated by historians.

Successionism is the further idea that these proto-Protestants are evidence of a continuous hidden church of true believers, despite their manifest differences in belief.

== Overview ==
Before Martin Luther and John Calvin, some leaders tried to reform Christianity. The main forerunners of the Protestant Reformation were Peter Waldo, John Wycliffe and Jan Hus. Martin Luther himself saw it important to have forerunners of his views, and thus he praised people like Girolamo Savonarola, Lorenzo Valla, Wessel Gansfort and other groups as prefiguring some of his views.

== Claimed to have prefigured Protestantism ==
Pre-reformation movements that have been argued, with differing degrees of anachronism and accuracy, as having individual ideas later espoused by some Protestant groups include:

- Antidicomarians: An active Christian sect from the 3rd to 5th century. They believed that Mary's virginity was not perpetual. Their radical opponents may have been Collyridians, those who allegedly worshipped Mary as though she was equated to the Trinity.
- Jovinian and Jovinianism (died c. 405): Jovinian was a 4th-century theologian who challenged the wave of asceticism in the 4th century, challenged the exaltation of virginity, denied the perpetual virginity of Mary, and he believed that there is no difference between abstaining from food and enjoying it with thanksgiving. Jovinian taught a perseverance doctrine similar to John Calvin, as he taught the truly regenerate will persevere to the end. Some also have argued Jovinian held grace oriented salvation views, similar to the Reformation. Jovinian is sometimes praised as an early forerunner of the reformation. It has been argued that Jovinian believed in a distinction between the visible and invisible churches, based on his statement that the Church is founded on faith, and that all in the Church are taught by God and that no "unripe" members exist within the Church and no one can enter the church "by fraud".
- Byzantine Iconoclasm: this was a movement within the Eastern Church that gained imperial support in the 8th century from Leo III the Isaurian (685–741) and some later emperors. They eliminated religious icons, with some violence, possibly influenced by Islam. Protestant Iconoclasts looked back to the Byzantine iconoclasts to justify their assault on religious image. Protestants in the reformation used the same Biblical and Patristic texts used by the Byzantines in the 8th and 9th centuries, to condemn religious images.
- Claudius of Turin: Claudius of Turin was the Bishop of Turin; because of his iconoclasm, he is often seen as proto-Protestant. His commentary on the Epistle to Galatians shows some of his views prefigure those expressed by both the Waldensians and Protestants centuries later. Claudius, in his writings, maintained that faith is the only requirement for salvation, denies the supremacy of Peter, sees praying for the dead to be useless, attacked practices of the church and held the church to be fallible.
- Gottschalk of Orbais: Gottschalk was a 9th-century Saxon theologian who was condemned for heresy, due to his teachings on predestination and that Christ's redemption was only for the elect. The grace views of Gottschalk mirror the Protestant sola fide doctrine.
- Ratramnus: Ratramnus was a theologian who died in 868. Ratramnus believed that the Eucharist is merely symbolic, thus rejecting the real presence of the Eucharist. Ratramnus also believed in single predestination. The writings of Ratramnus influenced Protestant theologians and contributed to the later Reformation.
- Ælfric of Eynsham: Protestants have appealed to Ælfric of Eynsham as evidence for the English church not believing transubstantiation, because of his book: Sermo de sacrificio in die pascae where he defines the Eucharist.
- Berengar of Tours: Berengar of Tours (c. 1005 – 1088) was a forerunner of the reformation. Berengar of Tours argued against transubstantiation, saying that it is against logic and the Bible, and taught that the body and blood were not "real" in the Eucharist.
- Albigenses: the Albigenses were a religious group that first appeared in Western Europe around the first half of the 11th century. They were earlier called Cathars. The Cathars denied the Incarnation, Resurrection, Trinity and held to dualist ideas. The inclusion of the Cathars or Albigenses as a Protestant forerunner has been a matter of controversy, some people in the past attempting to justify the Albigensians as Protestants have even argued against them being dualist, however without much evidence. There is a degree of confusion about the Albigensians, as they are sometimes lumped with their contemporaries the Waldensians, an unrelated movement. Further, centuries later, "Albigensian" was used as a slur for the unrelated Huguenots.
- Bosnian Church: Also called Krstjani, they denied the power of the Pope and were excommunicated by both the eastern and western churches. Some have claimed that the Bosnian church is an early pre-reformist church.
- Pataria: The Pataria were an 11th-century group in northern Italy, that was against corruption in the church.
- Tanchelm: Tanchelm was a 12th-century preacher who rejected the structure of the Catholic church.
- Peter Abelard: Peter Abelard was a Frenchman in around the year 1100 who sought to include human reasoning as one of the ways to understand the meaning of Scripture, instead of believing without question everything the Church declared. He was condemned as a heretic, and his books were burned. Irish novelist and Abelard scholar George Augustus Moore (1852–1933), referred to Abelard as the "first protestant" prior to Martin Luther.
- Peter of Bruys: was a French reformer who fought against the Catholic church, he rejected infant baptism and religious images.
- Henry of Lausanne: Henry of Lausanne preached in France and his followers were called Henricans, Henry condemned Catholic clergy for their wealth.
- Arnold of Brescia: Arnold of Brescia attacked the Catholic bishops for their wealth, he was hanged in 1155.
- Waldensians: Waldensians were a 12th-century movement often viewed as a precursor to the Reformation. The Waldensians did not practice infant baptism and they rejected the use of indulgences; the Waldensians also denied transubstantiation. The Waldensians wanted to follow Jesus in poverty and simplicity. The Waldensians later joined the Protestant reformation. The Waldensian movement was started by Peter Waldo, they contested the institution of the papacy and the wealth of the church, however they still took part in the sacraments of the Catholic church.
- Fraticelli: the Fraticelli or Spiritual Franciscans were an extreme group of the Franciscans in the 13th century. The Fraticelli influenced later Protestant mystics.
- Marsilius of Padua: Marsilius (born in 1270) is sometimes called a forerunner of the reformation. Marsilius believed that the only source of truth for a Christian are the Scriptures, and rejected the Church as being the ultimate authority. Marsilius believed that obedience to papal decrees was not necessary for salvation, and he believed the Papal system to be of human arrangement and not divine. The beliefs of Marsilius were largely in agreement with the Protestant reformers.
- William of Ockham: Ockhamite philosophy influenced Luther and Protestant philosophy. Luther conveyed the ethical philosophy of Ockham into Protestantism. Ockham's stress on scripture anticipates Protestant views and some see him as a proto-Protestant.
- Thomas Bradwardine: Thomas Bradwardine was an English mathematician and theologian, who also served as Archbishop of Canterbury shortly before his death; he believed in the doctrine of predestination.
- Gregory of Rimini: Gregory of Rimini (1300 – November 1358) was an Italian theologian; his teachings influenced later Protestant Reformers. Rimini believed in the human inability to lead a moral life without divine grace, and in predestination.
- Friends of God: Friends of God or Gottesfreunde were a 14th-century Christian group in Germany, some of the leaders of the movement were executed for their criticism of the Catholic church, the movement foreshadowed the Protestant reformation. The Gottesfreunde movement was a democratic lay movement that stressed piety, devotion and holiness.
- Petrarch: Many Scholars have regarded Petrarch as a proto-Protestant who challenged the Pope's dogma.
- Strigolniki: The strigolniki were a 14th-century movement in Russia that were against monasteries, the upper clergy and they perhaps were iconoclastic. There is some debate if the strigolniki were similar to Protestantism or more "heretical".
- Lollardy: Lollardy was a 14th-century movement that stressed the importance of scripture, denied transubstantiation and rejected the system of the papacy. They were said to have taught the absolute sufficiency of scripture, maintaining it as the ultimate authority. They provided the view as an alternative to viewing the Church as an authority. The movement was started by John Wycliffe and its doctrine anticipated those found in the Protestant Reformation.
- Hussites: Hussites were a 15th-century group in Bohemia, which emerged after the execution of Jan Hus, who was influenced by the writings of John Wycliffe. Jan Hus condemned indulgences and believed the scriptures to be the only authority for every man.
  - Taborites: Taborites were a faction of the Hussite movement, they denied transubstantiation, veneration of saints, prayers for the dead, indulgences, confession to clergy and renounced oaths.
  - Utraquists: Utraquists insisted on communion under two kinds, apostolic poverty, "free preaching of the gospel" and the use of Czech in scripture reading.
- Lorenzo Valla: Lorenzo Valla broke loose from an infallible church tradition and thus some call him a Protestant forerunner and prefigured some teachings of the reformation. Luther himself praised Lorenzo Valla.
- Johannes von Goch: Goch asserted that the Bible is the supreme authority on doctrine, perhaps taught that faith alone is enough for salvation and questioned monasticism.
- Johann Ruchrat von Wesel: Johann attacked indulgences and rejected priesty celibacy and papal authority; he believed in predestination and in the church invisibile, and believed that the Scriptures are the only trustworthy authority.
- John of Wessel: John of Wessel attacked indulgences, rejected the Catholic doctrine of transubstantiation, Wessel believed that the pope and councils can err and laid stress on the faith of the recipient of the sacraments. While some Catholics have claimed that the identification of John of Wessel with Protestantism "exaggerates the similarities".
- Johannes Geiler von Kaysersverg: Born in 1445, Johannes was concerned for moral reform in Strasbourg, and preached about God's justice. His reforms laid groundwork for the later Protestant reform in Strasbourg.
- Girolamo Savonarola was an Italian preacher and reformer, he was born in 1452 and died in 1498. Historians believe that Girolamo Savonarola influenced Luther, and possibly also John Calvin. Despite having many beliefs that align with Roman Catholicism, Savonarola believed in divine grace, such as Protestants do. Savonarola declared, that good works are not a cause of predestination but result of predestination. His followers were called the Piagnoni. Savonarola never abandoned the dogmas of the Roman Catholic church, however his protests against papal corruption, reliance on the Bible as the main guide link Savonarola with the reformation. Although some dispute the inclusion of Girolamo Savonarola as a proto-Protestant.
- Pico della Mirandola: Pico della Mirandola published 900 theses against Rome, where he argued that "this is my body" must be seen symbolically and that no images should be adored. Pico was also an admirer of Girolamo Savonarola.
- Johann Reuchlin: Johann Reuchlin was a scholar, who got his master's decree in 1477, and later went through other studies. When the reformation had begun, he never left the Catholic church but was suspected of leaning towards reformation ideas. Later his grandnephew, Melanchthon joined the Protestant reformation.
- Johannes von Staupitz: Johannes was born in 1460 and served as Luther's superior in the Augustinian order, Staupitz stressed the doctrine of unconditional election.
- Faber Stapulensis: Faber was a forerunner of Luther in France, and anticipated the doctrine of justification by faith. Jacques Lefèvre d’Etaples wrote commentaries on the Bible which influenced Martin Luther.
- Erasmus: Erasmus was born only 20 years before Luther in the Netherlands and produced the Latin and Greek New Testament that the Reformers used for their vernacular translations. He sought thorough-going moral and institutional reform, and doctrinal tolerance through simplification, education and biblicism, though not doctrinal revolution or violence. Erasmus initially defended Luther when Luther was in trouble with authorities; yet he felt that the Luther's claim of the biblical doctrine of sola fide was not supported in the Bible, and that Luther's reforms verged on extremism and refused to support it, and ultimately remained loyal to the Roman Catholic hierarchy. However, mainstream Catholic contemporaries criticized Erasmus, charging him with "laying the egg that Luther hatched".

== Successionism ==
John Foxe (c. 1563) was the first English Protestant author to defend Protestantism from charges of novelty by claiming, in S.J. Barnett's words, "the continuity of a proto-Protestant piety since apostolic times": in England's case this included a national first-century conversion to Christianity from a visiting Joseph of Arimathea.

The continuity of a proto-Protestant piety since apostolic times is supported by the claims of a hostile witness, Papal Legate Cardinal (Catholic Church) Stanislaus Hosius in, De Haeresibus nostri temporis (1556), when he states, "If the truth of religion were to be judged by endurance and steadfastness in persecutions, no heretics would surpass the Anabaptists... If they were not so cruelly put down with the sword during the past twelve hundred years, they would swarm in greater numbers than all the Reformers."

According to Brethren missionary Edmund Hamer Broadbent in The Pilgrim Church (1931), over much of the Christian era, many Christian sects, cults and movements foreshadowed the teachings of what later became the Non-conformist Protestant movements.

=== Baptist successionism ===
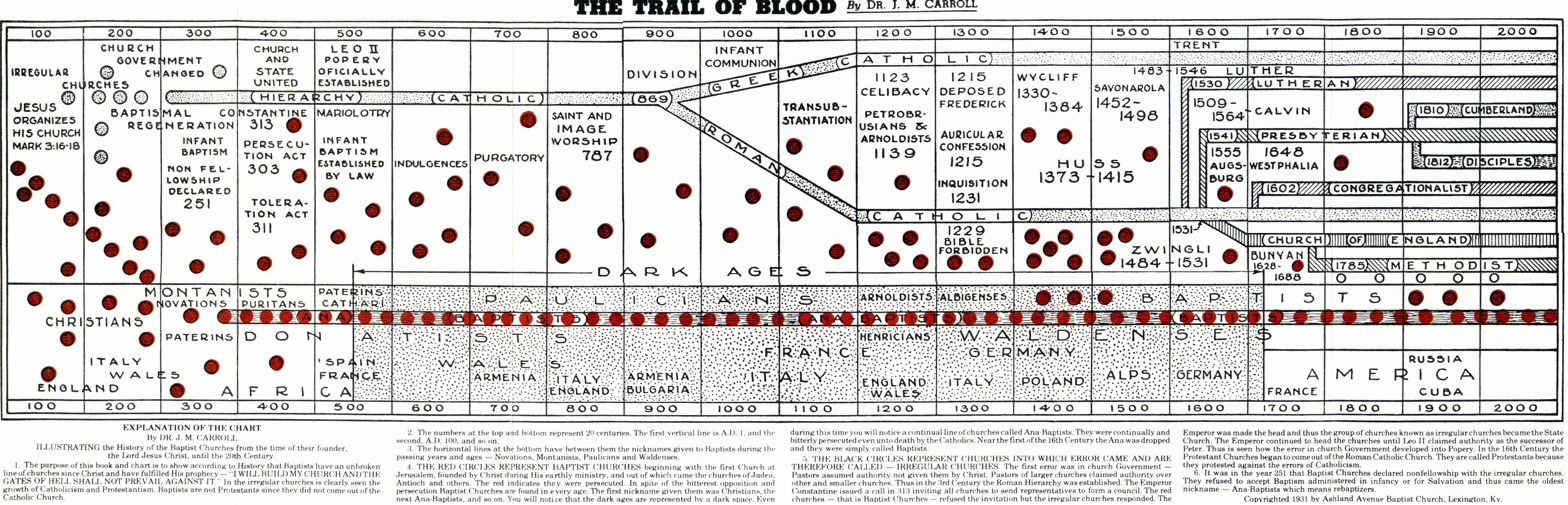
Timeline from The Trail of Blood

Baptist successionism postulates an unbroken lineage of churches which have held beliefs similar to those of current Baptists. Groups often included in this lineage include the Montanists, Novationists, Donatists, Paulicians, Albigenses, Waldenses, Petrobrusians, Arnoldists, Henricians, Hussites (partly), Lollards (partly) and Anabaptists. Baptist successionism proposes that groups such as Bogomils or Paulicians were Baptist in doctrine instead of Gnostic.

== Criticism ==
The idea of proto-protestants has been criticized as a diverse category whose only commonality is a perceived anti-Catholicism rather than any adherence to the five solae; the idea of successionism (or the hidden church) has further been criticized as lacking historical evidence, linking unrelated groups (e.g. the Manichaean Bogomil "Cathars", the Albigensian "Cathars", the semi-monastic Beguine movement, the antipapal fraticelli friars, the Trinitarian and eucharistic Waldenses, and the Lollards) and as fabricated to serve a polemical need.

For the Catholic denial of the antiquity of the Waldensians and assertion of Petrine apostolicity, "the ideal parry to Rome would have been to identify apostolic origins for the Waldenses, but the evidence for such a claim was thin to nonexistent, a factor often necessarily limiting arguments in favor of apostolic origins to rather vague assertions."

— S.J.Barnett

== See also ==
- Augustinian soteriology
- Comparison of Catharism and Protestantism
- History of Protestantism
- Landmarkism
- Medieval Restorationism
- Pelagianism
- Semi-Pelagianism
- Preachership
- The Trail of Blood
- Ethiopian Orthodox Tewahedo Church
- Proto-orthodox Christianity
- Stephanites
