= Marks of the Church =

Marks of the Church may refer to:

- Marks of the Church (Protestantism)
- Four Marks of the Church
