= Amos Cooper Dayton =

American minister (1811–1865)

Amos Cooper Dayton (April 1, 1811 – June 11, 1865) was an American medical doctor, Baptist minister, author, editor and educator, perhaps best remembered for his religious novels of the late 1850s and his role in the Landmarkism movement.

== Early life and education ==
Dayton was born at Plainfield, New Jersey, April 1, 1811, (Note: In Tull's history, the birth year is given as 1811.) the son of Robert Dayton and his wife. He attended local common schools, then went to college. Dayton graduated from medical college in 1834.

== Marriage and family ==
Dayton married Lucinda H. Harrison and they had children together.

== Career ==
By 1839 Dayton and his wife had moved to Mississippi, where they lived in Columbus and Vicksburg, while he had a practiced as a dentist. He stayed there until 1852. Dayton was reared Presbyterian, but was influenced by meeting J.R. Graves. He united with the Baptists in 1852.

James Robinson Graves, Dayton, and James Madison Pendleton were known as "The Great Triumvirate" of the Landmark movement. From 1854 through 1858, Dayton was the corresponding secretary of the Southern Baptist Convention Bible Board. He moved with his family to Nashville, Tennessee to take the position. Both Graves and Dayton were members of the First Baptist Church of Nashville.

Dayton made significant contributions to the Landmark movement of the mid-nineteenth century in the area of religious fiction, which "popularized Landmark tenets." His most serious novel, Theodosia Ernest, or, The Heroine of Faith, was published in 1856-1857 in two volumes. The first volume presented issues related to baptism, and the second discussed church polity. Theodosia Ernest originally appeared as a series in The Tennessee Baptist in 1855.

In 1857, R. B. C. Howell, a critic of Landmarkism, became pastor for a second tenure at First Baptist of Nashville, where he served until 1868. Howell had a struggle for control with Graves, described as the greatest controversy for the Southern Baptists until the "fundamentalist-moderate" controversy of the last decades of the twentieth century. It resulted in arguments over church discipline, and Graves' being excluded from the church and Dayton's being forced to resign from the Bible Board.

In 1858, Dayton published Pedobaptist and Campbellite Immersions, a review of numerous Baptist writers on issues related to baptism. It is considered the classic Landmark statement on this topic. He also served as associate editor of The Tennessee Baptist for about 18 months in 1858-1859.

J. R. Graves was the most prolific writer and outstanding leader of the Landmark movement. But, the 20th-century theologian J. E. Tull concluded that Dayton's 1858 book was "the most cogent attack upon 'alien immersions' which the Landmark movement produced."

He published the Baptist Banner in Atlanta, Georgia (1863–1864). At the time, he was pastor of Houston Lake Baptist Church and First Baptist Church, and the president of Houston Female Institute, all in Perry, Georgia.

== Death ==
Dayton died of tuberculosis at Perry, Georgia on June 11, 1865. He was buried in the Evergreen Cemetery.

== Works ==
" Essay On The Teeth ". Circa 1850. Source unknown.

- Theodosia Ernest, or, The Heroine of Faith, 1857, text online, Providence Baptist Ministries
- Pedobaptist and Campbellite Immersions: Being a Review of the Arguments of Doctors Waller, Fuller, Johnson, Wayland, Broadus, and Others, Nashville, TN: South-Western Publishing House, Graves, Marks & Co., 1858
