= The Trail of Blood =

1931 book by James Milton Carroll

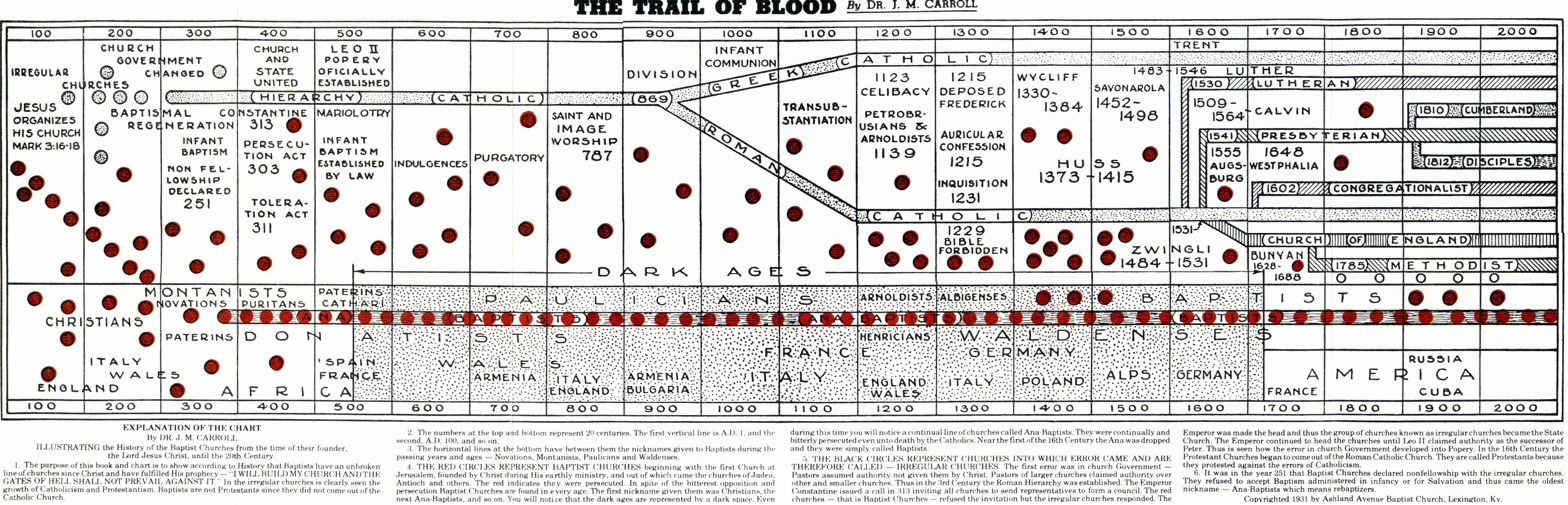
Timeline from 'The Trail of Blood

The Trail of Blood: Following the Christians Down Through the Centuries; or, the History of Baptist Churches from the Time of Christ, Their Founder, to the Present Day is a 1931 book by American Southern Baptist minister James Milton Carroll which collects five lectures he gave on the history of Baptist churches, which he presented as a succession from the first Christians. These claims stand in contrast with the mainstream view that Baptist congregations can be traced to English Dissenters of the 17th and 18th centuries who split from the Church of England.

The Trail of Blood has been criticized for linking together numerous unrelated sects and historical heresies that, according to mainstream belief, had no relation to Baptist theology or polity, and also for being pseudohistorical. However, supporters postulate that these disparate groups held beliefs similar to current Baptists, and many of the charges against these groups were raised by their enemies and thus are unreliable. The book and its claims are considered doctrinal primarily among some Independent Baptist churches.

== Content ==
Carroll presents modern Baptists as the direct successors of a strain of Christianity dating to apostolic times, reflecting a Landmarkist view first promoted in the mid-19th century by James Robinson Graves (1820–1893). Graves had started an influential movement in Tennessee and the western states. The Landmark controversy divided many Baptists, and ultimately led to the formation of the American Baptist Association in 1924, as well as of Gospel Missions and unaffiliated churches. This is a belief called Baptist successionism.

Carroll claims that modern Baptists descend from such earlier groups as:

- the Waldensians (founded in the 1170s, based in the Cottian Alps);
- the Novatianists (or Cathari) (founded in the 3rd century);
- the Paulicians (founded c. 650 in Armenia);
- the Donatists (originating in North Africa in the 4th century)

Carroll acknowledges a number of other writers, including G.H. Orchard (1796–1861) and John T. Christian (1854–1925). The title is taken from James Robinson Graves's The Trilemma. The book was published in the year Carroll died.

James Edward McGoldrick wrote a response to Carroll's work called Baptist Successionism which gave researched opposition to the theory of "Baptist successionism."

As of 2010 Ashland Avenue Baptist Church in Lexington, Kentucky held the copyright to Carroll's book.

== See also ==
- Apostolic Succession
- Proto-Protestantism

== Bibliography ==
- Duvall, James R. (2009). "The Successionism View of Baptist History" (PDF). Journal of Baptist Studies. 3: 3–15.
- Jonas, W. Glenn Jr. (2009). "The Spiritual Kinship Theory of Baptist Origins" (PDF). Journal of Baptist Studies. 3: 16–23.
- McBeth, H. Leon (1990-01-01). A Sourcebook for Baptist Heritage. B&H Publishing Group. ISBN 978-1-4336-7128-9.
- Maples, James Hoyle Jr. (2018-08-16). Forgotten but Not Gone: The Origin, Theology, Transmission, and Recurrent Impact of Landmarkism in the Southern Baptist Convention (1850–2012). Wipf and Stock Publishers. ISBN 978-1-5326-4416-0.
- Patterson, James A. (2009). "James Robinson Graves: History in the Service of Ecclesiology". Baptist History & Heritage. 44 (1): 72.
- Shurden, Walter B. (1993). The Struggle for the Soul of the SBC: Moderate Responses to the Fundamentalist Movement. Mercer University Press. ISBN 978-0-86554-424-6.
- Williams, D. H. (1999). Retrieving the Tradition and Renewing Evangelicalism: A Primer for Suspicious Protestants. Grand Rapids, Michigan: William B. Eerdmans Publishing Company. ISBN 0-8028-4668-8.
