= James Madison Pendleton =

American baptist preacher and theologian

James Madison Pendleton (1811–1891) was a leading 19th-century American Baptist preacher, educator and theologian.

== Early life ==
James Madison Pendleton was born November 20, 1811, in Spotsylvania County, Virginia, the son of John Pendleton and Frances Jackson Thompson. He was named for President James Madison. When he was small his parents moved to Christian County, Kentucky. At age seventeen, he united with the Bethel church in Christian County and was baptized.

== Ministry ==
J. M. Pendleton was ordained at Hopkinsville, Kentucky, in 1833. In his lifetime he pastored churches at Bethel, Hopkinsville, and Bowling Green in Kentucky; Murfreesboro in Tennessee; Hamilton in Ohio; and Upland in Pennsylvania. While pastoring in Bowling Green, Kentucky, Pendleton married Catherine Stockton Garnett in 1838. They had five children. In 1857 he became professor of Theology at Union University in Murfreesboro. Though a born Southerner, Pendleton disagreed with secession and moved north around 1862. Denison University conferred on him the title of Doctor of Divinity in 1865. Pendelton was involved with Baptist industrialist John P. Crozer and others in founding the Crozer Theological Seminary in Upland, Pennsylvania.

Pendleton, Amos Cooper Dayton, and James Robinson Graves, due to the work and influence, were known as "The Great Triumvirate" of the Landmark movement. His "An Old Landmark Reset" is considered a foundational document of this movement within the Southern Baptist Convention. According to David Dockery and Timothy George in Baptist Theologians, "Pendleton's desire to restrict Landmark ideology to the central issue of the authority and function of the local church, his atypical Southern opinions regarding slavery, and his desire to preserve the union of the United States" led toward a breach and dissolution of the "Triumvirate" following the Civil War.

In 1849, Pendleton wrote a series of letters, “Letters to Rev. W. C. Buck in Review of His Articles on Slavery”, in response to editorials by his friend and colleague William Calmes Buck, editor of the “Baptist Banner”. Pendleton disagreed with Buck and wanted his own letters published in the Baptist Banner; however, Buck would not publish them. Pendleton then had his letters published in an emancipationist newsletter, the Louisville Examiner. [2]

Pendleton, Dayton, and Graves articulated and promoted landmark beliefs through their books and newspaper articles in the Tennessee Baptist. Pendleton also wrote for Southern Baptist Review.

Pendleton and Graves published a hymn book called The Southern Psalmist in 1858.

Pendleton died March 4, 1891, and is buried in the Fairview Cemetery in Bowling Green, Kentucky.

== Writings ==
- An Old Landmark Reset
- Brief Notes on the New Testament
- Christian Doctrines, a Compendium of Theology
- Christianity Susceptible of Legal Proof
- Church Discipline
- Church Manual
- Sermons on Important Subjects
- The Atonement of Christ
- The Lord's Supper
- Three Reasons Why I Am a Baptist
- Reminiscences of a Long Life
- Letters to Rev. W.C. Buck, in Review of His Articles on Slavery
