= Church discipline =

Ecclesiastical discipline

Church discipline is the practice of church members calling upon an individual within the Church to repent for their sins. Church discipline is performed when one has sinned or gone against the rules of the church. Church discipline is practiced with the intent to make the offender repent and be reconciled to God. It was also used to protect the other church members from the influence of sin, and to prevent other members from acting out.

== The Bible's teaching on corrective church discipline ==
Ultimate authority resides in Christ, who authorizes the church to use it as needed. (Matthew 18:17)

Corrective discipline is for:

- Troublemakers and those who sow discord. (Romans 16:17)
- The unruly and disorderly. (1 Thessalonians 5:14)
- Those who disobey the great doctrines of the faith. (2 Thessalonians 3:13-14)
- Those who deny the great doctrines of the faith. (1 Timothy 6:3-4)

Procedures in discipline

- Arrange a private meeting with the offender. (Matthew 18:15)
- If a private meeting fails, meet with them and several witnesses. (Matthew 18:16)
- Admonish and warn them. (Titus 3:10)
- As a final resort, bring the matter up to the whole church. (Matthew 18:17)
- Remove their membership, and avoid them. (Romans 16:17)
- Be ready to forgive them when repentance occurs. (2 Corinthians 2:7)

Purpose of discipline

- To maintain the standards of the church to a watching world. (Matthew 5:13-16)
- To keep sin from spreading throughout the church. (Joshua 7:3); (1 Corinthians 5:6-7)
- Help the guilty person find their way to God. (2nd Corinthians 2:6-8)
- To escape God's judgment upon habitually sinning saints. (1 Corinthians 11:30)

== Practice by ecclesiastical tradition ==
=== Catholic Church discipline ===
The Congregation for the Doctrine of the Faith is the oldest of the nine congregations of the Roman Curia. Among the most active of these major Curial departments, which oversees Catholic doctrine. The CDF is the modern name for what used to be the Holy Office of the Inquisition.

According to Article 48 of the Apostolic Constitution on the Roman Curia, Pastor Bonus, promulgated by Pope John Paul II on June 28, 1988: "the duty proper to the Congregation for the Doctrine of the Faith is to promote and safeguard the doctrine on the faith and morals throughout the Catholic world: for this reason everything which in any way touches such matter falls within its competence."

The Congregation for Divine Worship and the Discipline of the Sacraments is the congregation of the Roman Curia that handles most affairs relating to liturgical practices of the Latin Catholic Church as distinct from the Eastern Catholic Churches and also some technical matters relating to the Sacraments.

In some contexts, church discipline may refer to the rules governing an ecclesiastical order, such as priests or monks, such as clerical celibacy.

=== Protestant church discipline ===
Along with preaching and proper administration of the sacraments, Protestants during the Reformation considered it one of the marks of a true church. Church discipline is mentioned several times in the Bible.

In I Corinthians 5 and other passages, the Bible teaches that sin if not dealt with in a congregation can contaminate other members of the body of Christ, as leaven spreads through bread. This was an important doctrine in the development of different branches of the Plymouth Brethren movement. It is also an important topic of discussion in many churches today.

The Westminster Confession of Faith sees the three steps of church discipline as being "admonition", "suspension from the sacrament of the Lord's Supper for a season" and then finally excommunication.

=== Latter-day Saints church discipline ===
In the Church of Jesus Christ of Latter-day Saints, a bishop or a stake president may hold a church membership council (formerly known as a "disciplinary council) to consider restrictions on or withdrawal of church membership for members who commit crimes or otherwise violate the standards of the church.

== See also ==
- Anathema
- Shunning
