= On the Councils and the Church =

1539 treatise by Martin Luther

On the Councils and the Church (1539) is a treatise on ecclesiology written by Protestant reformer Martin Luther late in life.

On the Councils and the Church is best known for its teaching, in the third part of the book, of the "seven marks of the Church", of which the One Holy Catholic and Apostolic Church can be recognized. These marks are:

1. holy word of God, effective means of grace
2. holy sacrament of baptism, regeneration
3. holy sacrament of the altar
4. office of keys exercised publicly, although not the office of pope. Includes also private confession as a means of grace.
5. it consecrates or calls ministers, or has offices, that is, to administer, bishops, pastors, and preachers.
6. prayer, public praise, and thanksgiving to God, the liturgy
7. holy possession of the sacred cross, suffering and carrying the cross as followers of Christ.

== English translation ==
Luther's Works: vol. 41

== See also ==
- Four Marks of the Church
