= San Marcos Baptist Academy =

San Marcos Academy

Location
- 2801 Ranch Road 12; San Marcos, Texas; United States; 29.8990°N 98.0029°W

Information
- Type: Private, co-ed, boarding, Southern Baptist
- Motto: Ad Viros; Faciendos
- Religious affiliation: Baptist General Convention of Texas
- Established: 1907
- President: Dr. Brian Guenther
- Principal: Tamra Howe & Rebecca Nash
- Staff: 40
- Faculty: 60
- Enrollment: 360
- Campus: Suburban, 220 acres (89 ha)
- Colors: Laurel purple and forest green
- Mascot: Bears
- Nickname: Battlin' Bears
- Affiliations: Texas Association of Private and Parochial Schools (High School); Christian Athletic League of San Antonio (Middle School)
- Website: smabears.org

San Marcos Academy or SMA (also known as San Marcos Baptist Academy or SMBA) is a private, coeducational, college preparatory Christian school that is affiliated with the Baptist General Convention of Texas. It is accredited by the Southern Association of Colleges and Schools and the Texas Association of Boarding Schools.

The academy was founded in 1907 and has always been coeducational and religiously affiliated. Its mission is to educate young men and women within a nurturing community based upon Christian values. The academy accepts boarding students in grades 6–12 and day students in grades K-12. Enrollment in 2009 was 274, with about 75% in the residence program. The school is located in the Texas Hill Country in San Marcos, Texas, United States, south of Austin, and north of San Antonio.

San Marcos Academy is one of the oldest boarding schools in the state of Texas, and was established in 1907 by Texas Baptists with the support of the city of San Marcos. The academy's first president was James Milton Carroll.

== History ==
Organizing for the school began in 1905. The Southwest Texas Baptist Conference matched $25,000 raised by San Marcos, Texas locals to establish the institution in 1907. James Milton Carroll, a leader of the founding campaign, served the academy as its first president. The school enrolled an entering class of 200 students on September 24, 1908. Carroll resigned in 1911; the academy's original building, granted a state historical marker in 1970, became known as Carroll Hall. Thomas Green Harris succeeded Carroll, and the Christian Education Program of the Baptist General Convention of Texas began administrative oversight in 1911.

After the United States entered World War I in 1917, the federal government granted the academy a junior unit of the Reserve Officer Training Corps. For a time all male students were require to have served in the corps of cadets, and all those in grades nine through twelve are formally enrolled in the army Junior ROTC program, but it is no longer required. Girls have also participated in military training on an optional basis since 1973 when two students, Mary Shepard and Karen Stubbs led the development of the first female platoon. By 1936 the academy's physical plant had increased to twelve buildings on a fifty-six-acre site valued at $400,000. Students in grades one through twelve studied general academic courses as well as fine arts and business subjects.

Minister Jack E. Byrom became the school's president in 1965. In 1968 more than 500 students in grades three through twelve attended the academy; in 1986 the enrollment was 240 boys in grades six through twelve and 120 girls in grades nine through twelve. The school sold its campus to Southwestern Texas State University in 1979. In January 1982, under Byrom's administration, the academy moved from that location to a more spacious lot on Ranch to Market Road 12. The academy has had students from a number of other states and foreign nations. Most Academy students are day students and are only there during the day and attend mandatory chapel services on Wednesdays, and devotionals on Mondays. Chapel services are currently optional for both boarding and day students, taking place at First Baptist Church on Sunday.

Since the school's beginning, the academy has accepted students from all religious faiths. Students of both sexes have competed in athletic events against other private schools.

The academy is a member of the Texas Association of Private and Parochial Schools and is accredited by the Independent Schools Association of the Southwest; the Southern Association of Colleges and Schools and Cognia, its successor agency, since 1913; the Texas Education Agency; and the accrediting commission of the Texas Association of Baptist Schools. A fifteen-member board of trustees selected by the Baptist General Convention of Texas continues to govern the academy.

Thirty-five full-time and twelve part-time teachers composed the faculty in 1993; three administrators supervised Academy operations. That year the endowment of the academy exceeded $3 million, and the institution's assets exceeded $15 million. After selling its original site and buildings to Southwest Texas State University (now Texas State) in 1979, the academy moved to its present 200-acre (0.81 km^{2}) site.

== School mascot and colors ==
The mascot of SMA is the bear: the boys' sports teams are referred to as “Bears” and the girls' teams as “Lady Bears”. The school colors are derived from the mountain laurel and are forest green and purple.

== Tuition ==
Tuition varies per student and program. Please refer to the website for the most updated information.

== Bibliography ==
- Childs, James Lafayette (1938). History of San Marcos Baptist Academy (Thesis). Austin, TX: University of Texas. OCLC 27157575.
- Ford, Lester Harlan (1960). A History of San Marcos Baptist Academy, 1907-1959 (Thesis). Greeley, CO: Colorado State College, Division of Education. OCLC 8351191.

== See also ==
- Southern Baptist Convention
