= Church invisible =

Christian theological concept

The church invisible, invisible church, mystical church or church mystical, is a Protestant Christian theological concept of an "invisible" Christian Church of the elect who are known only to those who are Christian followers of the gospel of Jesus Christ and genuinely saved, in contrast to the "visible church"—that is, the institutional body on earth which preaches the gospel and administers the sacraments. Every member of the invisible church is "saved," while the visible church contains all individuals who are saved though also having some who are "unsaved." According to this view, Bible passages such as Matthew 7:21–27, Matthew 13:24–30, and Matthew 24:29–51 speak about this distinction.

== Views on the relation with the church visible ==
=== Distinction between two churches ===
The first recorded individual in church history to introduce a view of an invisible and a visible church is Clement of Alexandria. Some have also argued that Jovinian and Vigilantius held an invisible church view.

The concept was advocated by St Augustine of Hippo as part of his refutation of the Donatist sect. However he, as other Church Fathers before him, saw the invisible Church as being contained within the visible Church, unlike the later Protestant reformers who did not identify the Catholic Church as the true church. Augustine was strongly influenced by the Platonist belief that true reality is invisible and that, if the visible reflects the invisible, it does so only partially and imperfectly (see theory of forms). Others question whether Augustine really held to some form of an "invisible true Church" concept.

The concept became more central during the Protestant Reformation, as Reformers used it to create a distinction between "visible" Roman Catholic Church, which they viewed as corrupt, and the true believers within Catholicism, as well as true believers within their own, Protestant denominations. John Calvin described the church invisible as "that which is actually in God's presence, into which no persons are received but those who are children of God by grace of adoption and true members of Christ by sanctification of the Holy Spirit... [The invisible church] includes not only the saints presently living on earth, but all the elect from the beginning of the world." He continues in contrasting this church with the church scattered throughout the world. "In this church there is a very large mixture of hypocrites, who have nothing of Christ but the name and outward appearance..." (Institutes 4.1.7) Richard Hooker distinguished "between the mystical Church and the visible Church," the former of which is "known only to God."

John Wycliffe, often viewed as a precursor to the Reformation, also believed in an invisible church made of the predestined elect. Another precursor of the Reformation, Johann Ruchrat von Wesel believed in a distinction between the visible and invisible church.

The Pietist movement later took this concept a step further, formulating the concept of ecclesiolae in ecclesia ("little churches within the church"). This was viewed as necessary by reformers who hoped to purify a state church; while almost everyone had been baptised as infants, many Pietists believed that most church members were living in sin.

=== Non-distinction ===
Catholic theology, reacting against the Protestant concept of an invisible Church, emphasized the visible aspect of the Church founded by Christ; in the twentieth century, however, they placed more stress on the interior life of the Church as a supernatural organism, identifying the Church, as in the encyclical Mystici corporis Christi of Pope Pius XII, with the Mystical Body of Christ. In Catholic doctrine, the one true Church is the visible society founded by Christ, namely, the Catholic Church under the global jurisdiction of the Pope.

Mystici corporis Christi rejected two views of the Church which Catholicism saw as extreme:

1. A rationalistic or purely sociological understanding of the Church, according to which it is merely a human organization with structures and activities, is mistaken. The visible Church and its structures do exist but the Church is more, as it is guided by the Holy Spirit:
  Although the juridical principles, on which the Church rests and is established, derive from the divine constitution given to it by Christ and contribute to the attaining of its supernatural end, nevertheless that which lifts the Society of Christians far above the whole natural order is the Spirit of our Redeemer who penetrates and fills every part of the Church.
2. An exclusively mystical understanding of the Church is mistaken as well, because a mystical "Christ in us" union would deify its members, meaning that the acts of Christians are simultaneously the acts of Christ. The theological concept una mystica persona (one mystical person) refers not to an individual relation but to the unity of Christ with the Church and the unity of its members with Christ in the Church.

Eastern Orthodox theologian Vladimir Lossky accuses the concept of a Church Invisible of being a "Nestorian ecclesiology," which would "divide the Church into distinct beings: on the one hand a heavenly and invisible Church, alone true and absolute; on the other, the earthly Church (or rather 'the churches'), imperfect and relative."

== See also ==
- Catholicism
- Christendom
- Communion of Saints
- Kallistos Ware's view on the nonduality between the church visible and church invisible
- Four Marks of the Church
- Invisible churches (slavery)
- Priesthood of all believers
- Radical Reformation
- Secret Chiefs
- Tzadikim Nistarim
