= Elisabeth Calmes =

Luxembourgish painter

Elisabeth Calmes (born 1947) is a Luxembourgish painter who has been based in Paris for over 40 years.

== Biography ==
Calmes was born in Luxembourg City on 30 July 1947. She was raised on the banks of the River Moselle, where she practised water-skiing as a member of the Calmes family of waterskiers, becoming a European junior champion. She went on to study interior architecture at the ENSAAMA decorative arts school in Paris before focusing on painting at the Académie de Port-Royal. Her works have been widely presented in solo and group exhibitions across Luxembourg, Belgium, Poland, Russia and the United States.

From 2008 to 2009, she settled for a time in Brooklyn, New York, painting her impressions of the city on canvas or carton. These have been exhibited at The Luxembourg House in New York (2008) and at the Nolan-Rankin Galleries in Houston, Texas.

Calmes has published several books presenting her work including Calmes. Peintures. Paintings. (2005).

== Works ==
- Face aux mystères des choses (1993-2006)
- Ô temps suspends ton vol (1994-2002)
- Aux couleurs du pays (1995-2003)
- Les lieux cultivent l’esprit (1995-2003)
- Couleurs de tant de possibles (1998-2011)
- Un trait de l’âme (2001-2005)
- Portes et passages (2002-2004)
- Des goûts et des couleurs (2004)
- Meandering through New York (2008-2010)
- Itinerary-Resonance (2012)
- Voyage à travers la Bulgarie (2013-2014)
