= Thomas Crosby (Baptist) =

English writer

Thomas Crosby (1683–1751) was an English writer, author of History of the English Baptists.

== Life ==
Crosby was born in London, and was initially a sailor. He attended the Royal Mathematical School.

A Baptist convert, Crosby was a member of the Horselydown church in Southwark. He kept a mathematical and commercial school there, from 1710 for 40 years. With John Robinson as partner in the school, Crosby had a business selling instruments, globes and books. He married the daughter of Benjamin Keach, as did Keach's successor as pastor, Benjamin Stinton (d. 1719).

Crosby successfully advocated the divisive selection of John Gill as Stinton's successor, but then fell under a cloud with the church. Expelled, he joined the Unicorn Yard congregation (the secession of those dissatisfied with Gill), but was again pushed out. In both cases, his honesty was put into question.

== Works ==
Crosby's History of the English Baptists, from the Reformation to the beginning of the reign of George I (1738–40, 4 vols.), has biographical notices of earlier Baptist ministers, but is not acute in distinguishing different divisions of the Baptists, although Crosby acknowledged the distinctions made by Stinton. In fact, much of the materials used by Crosby were collected by Stinton. The work gave offence to Baptists when it appeared. The next historian of the English Baptists, Adam Taylor the nephew of Dan Taylor, distinguished the Particular Baptists from the General Baptists, writing about the latter.

Crosby also wrote A Brief Reply to Mr. John Lewis's History of the Rise and Progress of Anabaptism in England, 1738, against John Lewis. He supplied Daniel Neal with information on Baptists for his History of the Puritans.

In 1719 Crosby published The London Practice, which was an instructional work for merchants. He wrote a Mariner's Guide (1751) or Complete Treatise on Navigation. In 1749 his The Book-keeper's Guide was published.

== Notes ==
Attribution

This article incorporates text from a publication now in the public domain: Stephen, Leslie, ed. (1888). "Crosby, Thomas". Dictionary of National Biography. Vol. 13. London: Smith, Elder & Co.
