= Keith Calmes =

American guitarist, educator, composer, and author (born 1966)

Keith Calmes (born March 1, 1966) is an American guitarist, educator, composer, and author. He has transcribed several works for Mel Bay Publications, including Guitar Music of the Sixteenth Century and The Eight Masterpieces of Alonso Mudarra. Doctor Calmes has earned degrees in Classical Guitar Performance from California State University, Northridge, the Juilliard School, and the University of Southern California.

His performance credits include a Carnegie Hall recital debut, concerti with the Monmouth Symphony, a performance with Carlos Barbosa-Lima, and concerts with flautist Marjorie Koharski. Doctor Calmes has also performed at the Nicholas Roerich Museum in New York City, the chapel of the United Nations, conferences put on by the Fellowship of Quakers in the Arts, the American String Teachers Association, Asbury Lanes, the Pentagon, the EPA headquarters, the National Security Agency, Busch Gardens Williamsburg, and the Guitar Foundation of America. Keith has also opened for legendary surf guitarist Dick Dale.

Doctor Calmes has been presented with the Outstanding Teacher Award from The College of New Jersey. Red Bank Orbit has called him "a classical master...sublimely soothing, yet detail intensive...Belmar's best-kept secret (and just plain best)." Classical Guitar Magazine has praised Keith Calmes as "extremely well played...very listenable." The Aquarian Weekly says that "Keith is a real artist, in that his primary concern is the music, first and foremost, and commercial or monetary considerations take a back seat."

== Discography ==
- Still Life and Simple Dreams (2008)
- All We Know is Now (2012)
- Holiday Guitar Music (2014)
- The Girls Collection (2015)
- Asbury Lanes (2015)
- Classical Stiffs (2016)
- Psycho Circus (2016)
- Surf Guitar Classics (2017)
