= Marks of the Church (Protestantism) =

The Marks of the Church are those things by which the True Church may be recognized in Protestant theology. Three marks are usually enumerated: the preaching of the Word, the administration of the sacraments, and church discipline.

The Belgic Confession devotes a chapter (Article 29) to the "Marks of the True Church" and lists them as follows:

The true church can be recognized if it has the following marks: The church engages in the pure preaching of the gospel; it makes use of the pure administration of the sacraments as Christ instituted them; it practices church discipline for correcting faults. In short, it governs itself according to the pure Word of God, rejecting all things contrary to it and holding Jesus Christ as the only Head. By these marks one can be assured of recognizing the true church-- and no one ought to be separated from it.

The Anglican Thirty-nine Articles states in chapter 19:

The visible Church of Christ is a congregation of faithful men, in which the pure Word of God is preached, and the Sacraments be duly ministered according to Christ’s ordinance, in all those things that of necessity are requisite to the same.

The Baptist Orthodox Creed defines the "Visible Church of Christ on Earth" in Article 30:

And the Marks by which She is known to be the true Spouse of Christ, are these, viz. Where the Word of God is rightly Preached, and the Sacraments truly Administred, according to Christ's Institution, and the Practice of the Primitive Church; having Discipline and Government duly Executed by Ministers or Pastours of God's Appointing, and the Churches Election, that is a true constituted Church.

Louis Berkhof notes that Reformed theologians have differed as to the number of marks: Theodore Beza spoke of only one (preaching), John Calvin and Heinrich Bullinger spoke of two (preaching and sacraments), while Peter Martyr and Zacharias Ursinus spoke of three – preaching, sacraments and discipline. Nevertheless, Edmund Clowney points out that Calvin "included discipline in the proper observance of the sacraments." Albert Mohler calls church discipline the "missing mark" of the church. A few Puritan writers, such as Richard Sibbes, considered prayer a fourth mark of the church:

I answer, our Church is easily proved to be a true Church of Christ: First, because it hath all the essentialls, necessary to the constitution of a true Church; as sound preaching of the Gospel, right dispensation of the Sacraments, Prayer religiously performed, and evill persons justly punisht (though not in that measure as some criminals and malefaetors deserve:) and therefore a true Church.

Mark Dever has set out nine marks of a healthy (rather than true) church, but does not include the sacraments.

== See also ==
- Chicago-Lambeth Quadrilateral
- Means of grace
- On the Councils and the Church
- One true church
