= Preachership =

A preachership was the title originally given to the Catholic congregations of men with superior education endowed (by laity or clergy) to give about a hundred sermons to the public as a result of local dissatisfaction with poor-quality sermons of the medieval church. These sermons were considered more important than the Eucharist.

Preacherships were found in Stuttgart, Reutlingen, Eisenach, and Jena. Many preachers in the towns as Stuttgart, Reutlingen, Eisenach, and Jena after 1517, became Protestant leaders, as they were attracted by Martin Luther's ideas during the Protestant Reformation.
