= Edmund Hamer Broadbent =

Plymouth Brethren missionary and author (1861–1945)

Edmund Hamer Broadbent (15 June 1861 – 28 June 1945) was a Christian missionary and author. Born in Crumpsall, Lancashire, England, Broadbent operated under the auspices of the Plymouth Brethren movement.

His missionary work from 1900 into the 1920s took him to Austria, Belgium, Egypt, Germany, Poland, Russia, Turkey, the Baltic states, North and South America, and Uzbekistan. He spoke fluent French and German and could speak some Russian.

Broadbent's book, The Pilgrim Church, first published in 1931, is an alternative history of the church. It covers the history of many small Christian movements throughout the ages that in Broadbent's view attempted to follow the New Testament church pattern, what he regarded as the success of those that followed the pattern laid out by the apostles and the consequences to the churches that fell away from the pattern. Broadbent identifies many groups such as the Paulicians, the Bogomils, the Nestorians, the Waldensians, the Anabaptists, the Hutterites, the Methodists, the Russian Mennonites and the Mennonite Brethren as part of this common thread of descent. He classified early primitive churches to Anabaptist, and classified the Moravian Brethren as the historical roots to the later Brethren Movement.

John Bjorlie wrote that Broadbent was a "tidy-looking English gentleman with a bookish side who discovered ways of slipping into and out of countries that others just assumed were 'closed doors.' He was not a big man, and his pleasant, easygoing manner would not have conjured in your mind the picture of the fearless missionary."

Broadbent married Dora Holiday in Bradford in 1891, and together they had eight children.

Broadbent died in Stoke-on-Trent on 28 June 1945.

== Bibliography ==
- The Pilgrim Church ISBN 1-882701-53-4
- The Pilgrim Church ISBN 978-1-882701-53-7 (Gospel Folio Press, 2009)
- Jeremiah: The Book of the Prophet Jeremiah

== See also ==
- Baptist successionism
- Gospel Hall Assemblies § History
