= William Calmes Buck =

American baptist minister and slavery commentator

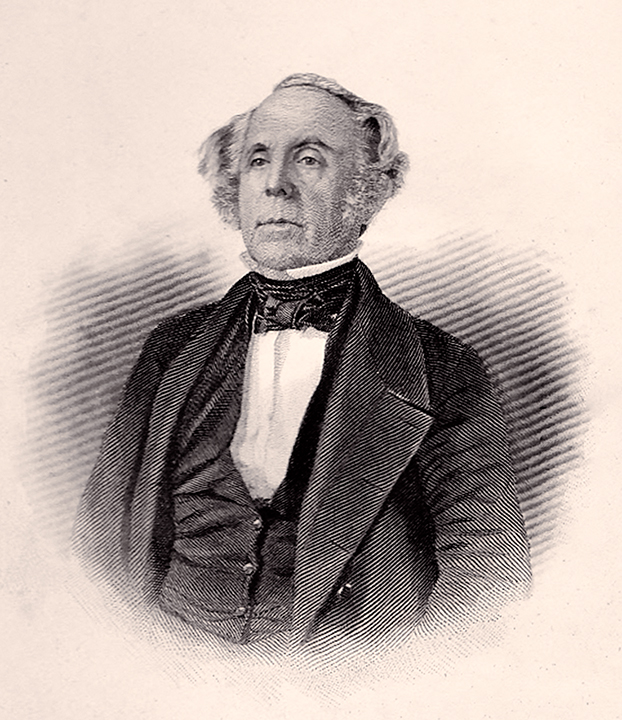
Portrait of William Calmes Buck scanned from an etching in his book "The Philosophy of Religion", South-Western Publishing House, Graves, Marks & Company, Nashville, Tennessee, 1857.

William Calmes Buck (1790–1872) was an American Baptist minister, author and editor, and commentator on slavery.

== Biography ==
Buck was born on August 23, 1790, in Shenandoah County, Virginia, near what is now the town of Front Royal. In spite of having only a basic formal education, he became a prominent Baptist minister, editor, author and denominational leader serving in Virginia, Kentucky, Tennessee, Alabama, Mississippi and Texas. Self-taught, he became fluent in Latin, Greek and Hebrew and was known as “Dr. Buck” at Baylor University where he was a lecturer in his later years.

Buck's parents and grandparents were farmers. His grandparents, Charles and Letitia (Sorrel) Buck were among the early settlers of the Shenandoah Valley and had owned about 3000 acres of land. The Bucks were Baptist and donated land for the Waterlick Baptist Church.

Waterlick Baptist Church was organized on April 15, 1787. It was about seven miles from Front Royal and about a half mile from the Buck homestead. It was a one room church made of logs and said to have comfortable seats, and a high pulpit. Between the Buck homestead and the church was a log house in which W. C. Buck lived for a time after his marriage.

Buck wrote that he was "baptized by Rev. Benjamine Daws on the North branch of the Shenandoah, on the fourth Sabbath in April, 24th day, 1808." He was ordained in Shenandoah County, Virginia. "The day that I was licensed was the 22nd of August 1812, and the next day I was just 22 years of age. From that time I have devoted myself to the work of the ministry."

Buck was a lieutenant of cavalry in the War of 1812 and preached his first sermon in uniform.

== Family ==
William Calmes Buck married Maria Lewright on Dec. 1, 1815 in Jefferson County, Virginia. Maria Lewright, daughter of Robert Lewright, was born in 1795. She died in childbirth on Jan. 8, 1822 at the age of 27 in Union County, Kentucky. They had four children: Robert Luther Buck, Maria Louisa Buck, Mary Elizabeth Buck, and an unnamed infant who died at birth.

William Calmes Buck then married Isabella Miriam Field on Jun. 30, 1829 in Woodford County, Kentucky. She, the daughter of Willis Field and Isabella Miriam Buck, was a first cousin once removed to William Calmes Buck. She was born on Aug. 16, 1809 and died on Mar. 18, 1852 at the age of 42 in Nashville, Tennessee. She was buried in Woodford County, Kentucky. Their eleven children were: Charles Willis Buck, William Thomas Buck, John Field Buck, Emma Buck, Giddings Judson Buck, John Samuel Buck, Willis Field Buck, Silas Calmes Buck, Thomas Buck, Paul Buck, and one stillborn child.

== Preaching ==
After the War of 1812, Buck returned to Waterlick Church as pastor. About 1820, he moved to the “wilderness” of Kentucky (Union and Woodford counties) where he founded several churches but supported his family by farming because preachers were not paid at the time.

David E. Buck noted " . . . Buck steered Kentucky Baptists through the very turbulent years 1820 - 1850, when bitter opposition to missions and salaried ministers almost did in the Baptist cause in that frontier state. . . . For fifteen years William preached in small churches around Union and Woodford Counties, almost complete wilderness. Paid nothing for his gospel labors (he later wrote his total receipts for his first twenty-four years in the ministry were $724, mostly merchandise!), Buck farmed to support his family of five."

In later years in Kentucky, W. C. Buck was founder and first pastor of the East Baptist Church of Louisville, editor of the state Baptist paper, compiler and publisher of a Baptist hymnal, and co-founder of a Bible society which later merged with what is now the American Bible Society. Upon leaving Kentucky, he held a denominational post in Nashville, Tennessee and later was pastor of the First Baptist Churches of Greensboro, Alabama, Selma, Alabama, and Columbus, Mississippi.

Buck preached the annual sermon before the Alabama state convention which met in Gainesville in 1858. He then settled in Selma as pastor of its Baptist church. In 1859, he again felt the need to publish his views and began a new paper, "The Baptist Correspondent". His paper was in competition with the existing "Southwestern Baptist" and failed after three years.

Buck was adamantly opposed to infant baptism. His book, “A Brief Defense of the Antiquity, History & Practice of the Baptists” explained his viewpoint. The book was based on two of his sermons which each lasted for three hours.

Although in his 70s during the Civil War, W. C. Buck served as a travelling chaplain to various Confederate Army sites and hospitals. After the war, he moved to Waco, Texas along with several of his children and extended family; however, he did not retire. The 1870 census shows him as the head of household and gives his occupation as "Minister of the Gospel".

== The Slavery Question ==
Virginia was a slave state and W. C. Buck grew up at a time when slavery was the norm. His parents and grandparents were slave owners. He worked in the fields with slaves, went to church with slaves and was baptized alongside a slave.

In 1849, Buck wrote a series of editorials in his publication, “The Baptist Banner”, regarding slavery. In his typical fashion, using the Bible, definitions and logic, he wrote that slavery benefited the slave who was unable to govern himself. Moreover, he wrote that there was a class of slave owners whose chief concern was “to instruct them into the knowledge of salvation by Christ Jesus.” Although Buck’s book (actually a pamphlet) is sometimes used to imply that he endorsed slavery as it existed, this is not the case. In fact, he believed that slavery had degenerated into evil and should gradually be abolished. He suggested that the government buy slaves from their owners and return them to Africa.

James M. Pendleton, a friend and colleague of W. C. Buck, disagreed with his editorials on slavery and wrote his own series of letters intended for publication in the Baptist Banner. However, Buck would not publish Pendleton’s letters. Pendleton then had his letters published in an emancipationist newsletter, the Louisville Examiner.

== Death ==
William Calmes Buck died on May 18, 1872, at the age of 81 in Waco, Texas. He was buried in Old First Street Cemetery, Waco, Texas. His tombstone is in the shape of a pulpit.

== Publications ==
William Calmes Buck was the author or editor of

- “The Baptist Banner and Pioneer”, Louisville, Kentucky, 1839 – 1850.
- "The Baptist Hymn Book", J. Eliot & Company, Louisville, Kentucky, 1842.
- "The Baptist Hymn Book", revised and enlarged, 42nd edition, G. H. Monsarrat & Co., Louisville, Kentucky, 1847.
- "The Slavery Question", Harney, Hughes & Hughes, Louisville, Kentucky, 1847.
- "A Brief Defense of the Antiquity, History & Practice of the Baptists", McDowell & Kimbrough, Columbus, Mississippi, 1854.
- "The Philosophy of Religion", South-Western Publishing House, Graves, Marks & Company, Nashville, Tennessee, 1857.
- “The Science of Life”, 1858.
- “Are You a Backslider?”, A Tract for the Army, 1861.
- “Confession, A Fundamental Doctrine of the Gospel Economy”, ca 1861 – 1865.
