= James Milton Carroll =

American historian, writer and pastor (1852–1931)

James Milton Carroll (January 8, 1852 – January 10, 1931) was an American Baptist pastor, leader, historian, author, and educator.

== Early life ==
James Milton Carroll was one of twelve children born to Benajah and Mary Eliza Carroll (née Mallard). His father was a Baptist minister. Born near Monticello, Arkansas, he moved in 1858 at age six with his family to Burleson County, Texas. Carroll was orphaned by age seventeen.

== Marriage and Education ==
On December 22, 1870, at age 18, Carroll married Sudie Eliza Womble from Caldwell, Texas. Despite leaving school at a young age, he attended Baylor University at Independence in 1873 and graduated after five years of intensive study, winning scholarships and oratory awards. Baylor awarded Carroll an honorary Master of Arts in 1884.

== Career ==
Carroll founded and led the Education Commission of the Baptist General Convention of Texas through its first ten years. He later served as secretary and statistician for the Convention. He was also involved with the regional Southern Baptist Convention (which became a national organization). He pastored churches in Anderson, Corpus Christi, Lampasas, Taylor, Waco, and San Antonio.

Active as an educator, Carroll helped found and was the first president of San Marcos Baptist Academy. He later served as the founding president of Oklahoma Baptist University in Shawnee, paying off the university's debt with his own funds, followed by service as president of Howard Payne University in Brownwood, Texas.

In addition to education, Carroll held various other positions. He was the solicitor for the Texas Baptist and Herald and served as an agent for the Southern Baptist Foreign Mission Board in Texas. Carroll worked as the financial agent for Baylor College (now the University of Mary Hardin-Baylor) and the endowment secretary for Baylor University.

His lasting legacy among Baptists is his booklet entitled The Trail of Blood (1931). This collection of five lectures describes Baptist history as a direct succession from apostolic times of early Christianity. The Trail of Blood promoted the Landmarkist view of Baptist origins, a movement that developed in the mid-nineteenth century among Tennessee and western congregations, and had lasting influences.

Carroll’s other publications include Texas Baptist Statistics (1895) and A History of Texas Baptists (1923). James Milton Carroll also wrote B.H. Carroll, The Colossus of Baptist History (1946), a biography of his older brother Benajah Harvey Carroll (B. H.), a prolific Baptist preacher and Baylor educator involved with founding the Southwestern Baptist Theological Seminary. B.H. Carroll also worked with the Waco Baptist Association and facilitated the move of Baylor University to the Waco location.

James Milton Carroll died in Fort Worth. He was buried in San Antonio.

== Books ==
- Texas Baptist Statistics (1895),
- A History of Texas Baptists (1923), and
- B. H. Carroll, the Colossus of Baptist History, a biography of his brother Benajah Harvey Carroll. (Later edition, ed. J.W. Crowder (Fort Worth TX: pvt. prtg., 1946)
