= John T. Christian =

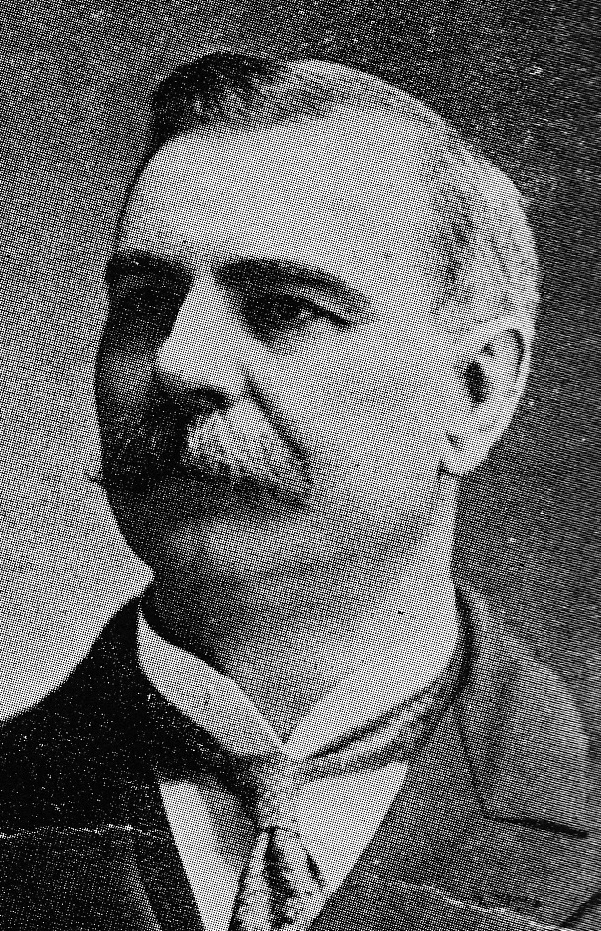
John T. Christian

John Tyler Christian (1854–1925) was a Baptist preacher, author and educator.

He was born December 14, 1854, near Lexington, Kentucky. His family moved to Henry County, Kentucky, when he was six years old. He professed faith in Christ and joined the Campbellsburg Baptist Church at the age of sixteen.

Christian earned his Bachelor's (1876) and Master of Arts (1880) degrees at Bethel College in Russellville, Kentucky. In 1888 the college conferred on him the honorary title of Doctor of Divinity, and in 1898, Keachie College, Louisiana, honored him with the title LL.D.

He became pastor in Tupelo, Mississippi, beginning in 1877, and served that church two years. He was afterward pastor of Sardis Church, and from there he moved to the First Baptist Church of Chattanooga, Tennessee, beginning in March, 1883. After pastoring there for three years, he next became Secretary of Missions for Mississippi Baptists. In 1893, he became pastor of the historic East Baptist Church in Louisville, Kentucky. Later he pastored churches in Arkansas.

In 1919, he became Professor of Church History at the Baptist Bible Institute, New Orleans, Louisiana (renamed the New Orleans Baptist Theological Seminary in 1946). He played a major role in the controversies surrounding the restorationist views of Baptist history taught by William Heth Whitsitt (see The Whitsitt Controversy) in the Southern Baptist Theological Seminary of Louisville, Kentucky. He wrote extensive rebuttals to Whitsitt's works and eventually published a history of the Baptists written from a successionist's perspective.

The John T. Christian Library of the New Orleans Baptist Theological Seminary is named in his honor. According to the seminary, "The basic collection came from the library of the outstanding church historian, John T. Christian, who was the first librarian of the seminary. He gave the school his personal library of 18,000 volumes when he joined the faculty in 1919." His personal papers are housed in the Archives at the John T. Christian Library, on campus at the New Orleans Baptist Theological Seminary.
