= 1920 Arkansas gubernatorial election =

- November 2, 1920
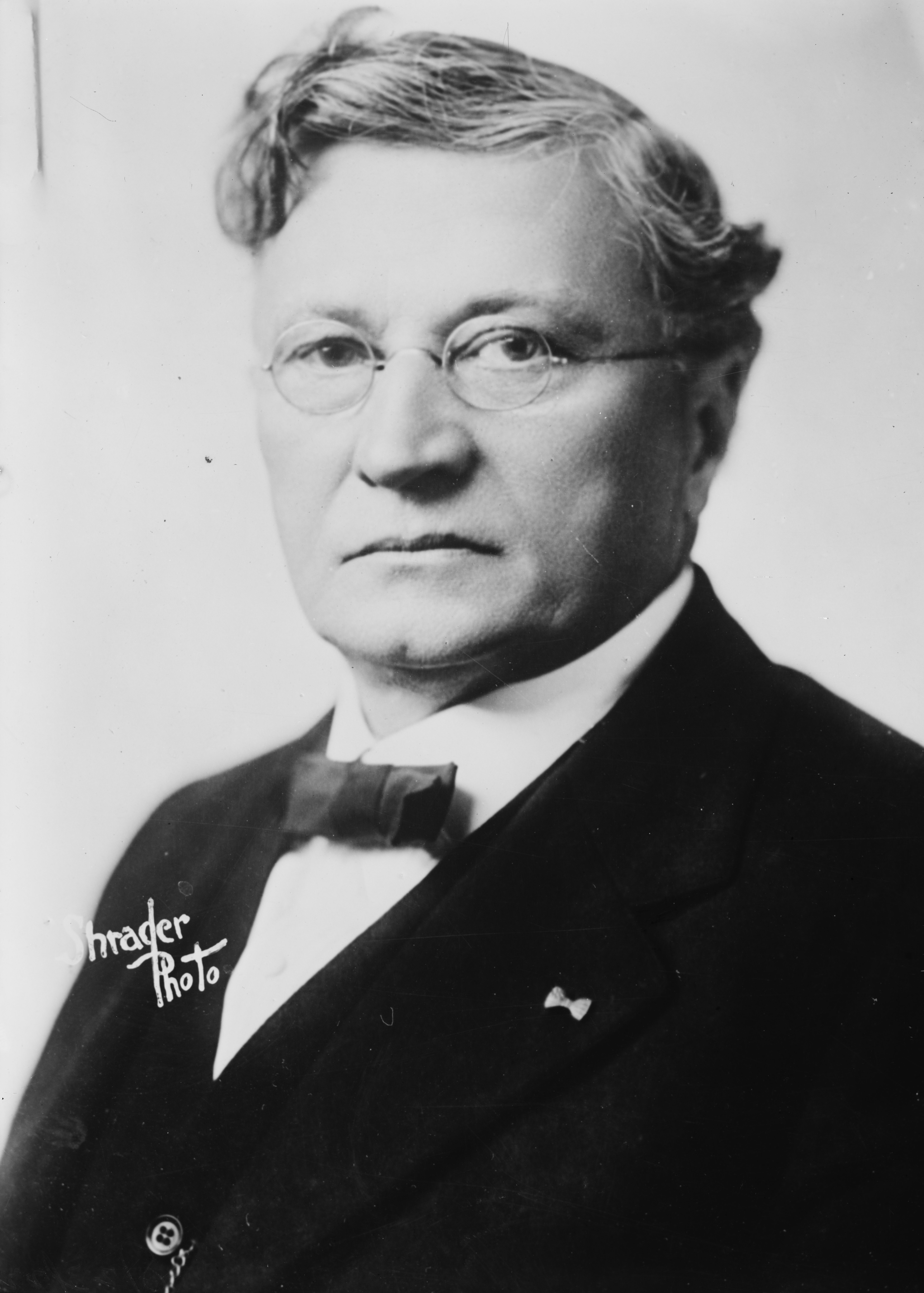

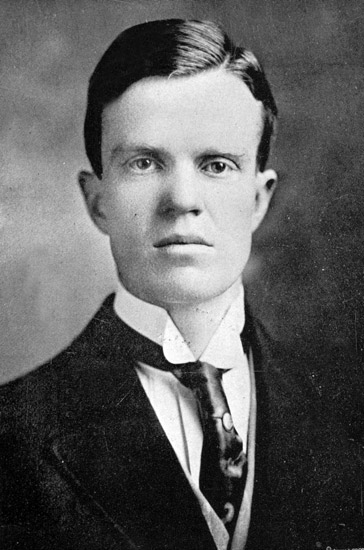

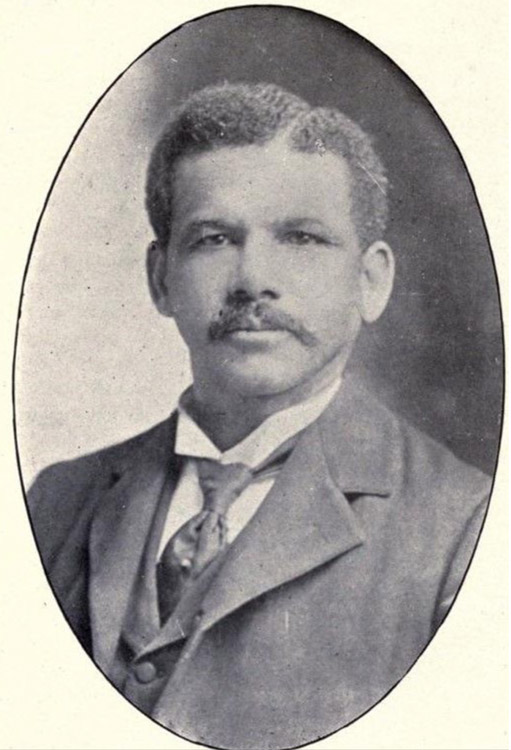
Nominee	Thomas Chipman McRae	Wallace Townsend	Josiah H. Blount
Party	Democratic	Republican	Negro Independent; "Black-and-Tan" Republican
Popular vote	123,637	46,350	15,627
Percentage	65.02%	24.38%	8.22%
- County results McRae: 40–50% 50–60% 60–70% 70–80% 80–90% Townsend: 50–60%
Governor before election
Charles Hillman Brough
Democratic
Elected Governor
Thomas Chipman McRae
Democratic

The 1920 Arkansas gubernatorial election was held on November 2, 1920, in order to elect the Governor of Arkansas. Democratic nominee and former member of the U.S. House of Representatives from Arkansas's 3rd district Thomas Chipman McRae defeated Republican nominee Wallace Townsend.

== Democratic primary ==
The Democratic primary election was held on August 10, 1920. Former member of the U.S. House of Representatives from Arkansas's 3rd district Thomas Chipman McRae received a majority of the votes (26.93%), and was thus elected as the nominee for the general election on November 2, 1920.

=== Results ===
1920 Democratic gubernatorial primary
Party	Candidate	Votes	%
Democratic	Thomas Chipman McRae	41,907	26.93%
Democratic	Smead Powell	32,263	20.73%
Democratic	Tom Terral	29,303	18.83%
Democratic	John C. Floyd	21,596	13.88%
Democratic	G. R. Haynie	16,747	10.76%
Democratic	Harry E. Walsh	5,771	3.71%
Democratic	John J. Riggs	4,017	2.58%
Democratic	Henry Stroupe	2,083	1.34%
Democratic	Frank W. Wells	1,922	1.24%
Total votes		155,609	100.00%

== General election ==
On election day, November 2, 1920, Democratic nominee Thomas Chipman McRae won the election by a margin of 77,287 votes against his foremost opponent Republican nominee Wallace Townsend, along with School Superintendent Josiah Blount, running on the third party "Black-and-Tan" Republican line. Blount's candidacy was in opposition to the state party's leadership moving to a "lily-white" posture. thereby retaining Democratic control over the office of Governor. McRae was sworn in as the 26th Governor of Arkansas on January 12, 1921.

=== Results ===
1920 Arkansas gubernatorial election
Party	Candidate	Votes	%
Democratic	Thomas Chipman McRae	123,637	65.02
Republican	Wallace Townsend	46,350	24.38
Negro Independent	Josiah H. Blount	15,627	8.22
Socialist	Sam Butler	4,534	2.38
Total votes		190,148	100.00
Democratic hold			
