= Southeastern Baptist College =

Coordinates: 31.748472°N 89.149451°W

- Type: Bible College
- Established: 1948
- Religious affiliation: Baptist Missionary Association of Mississippi
- Location: Laurel, Mississippi, United States
- Sporting affiliations: NCCAA
- Mascot: Chargers
- Website: www.southeasternbaptist.edu

Southeastern Baptist College is a private Baptist Bible college in Laurel, Mississippi. Founded in 1948, it offers both an associate degree program and a bachelor's degree program as well as a certificate. The college is accredited by the Association for Biblical Higher Education (ABHE). It is owned and operated by the Baptist Missionary Association of the state of Mississippi and governed by a board of trustees elected annually by the association.

== Academics ==
Southeastern offers Associate of Arts degrees in Bible, Business, and General Education and a Bachelor of Science degrees in Church Ministries and Business. All liberal arts courses are taught by qualified faculty from a Christian Worldview perspective.

Southeastern has many graduates continue on to such seminaries as the Baptist Missionary Association Theological Seminary in Jacksonville, Texas, Southwestern Baptist Theological Seminary in Fort Worth, Texas, Liberty University and Seminary in Lynchburg, Virginia, Temple Baptist Seminary in Chattanooga, Tennessee, Reformed Theological Seminary in Jackson, New Orleans Baptist Theological Seminary, Mid-America Baptist Theological Seminary in Memphis, Tennessee, as well as locally, William Carey University in Hattiesburg, Mississippi.

== Campus ==
The campus is located on 28 acres (110,000 m^{2}) containing nine buildings on Hwy. 15 N just outside Laurel, MS in the Shady Grove community. Laurel is just a short drive from Hattiesburg, Meridian, and Jackson, Mississippi.
