= 1916 Arkansas gubernatorial election =

- November 7, 1916
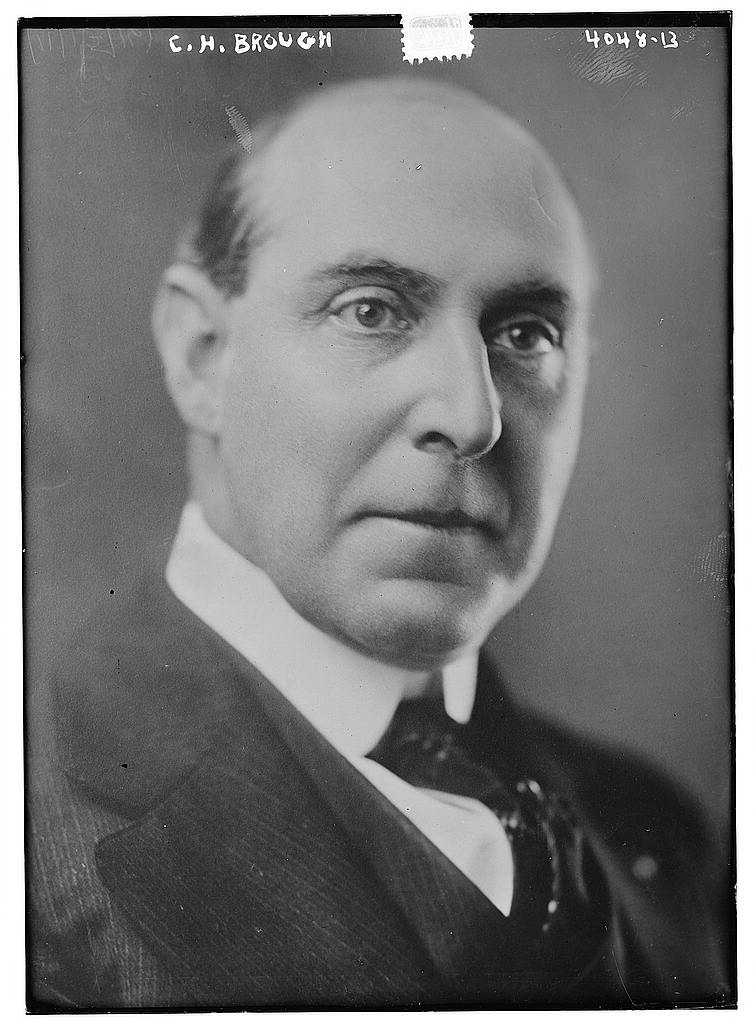

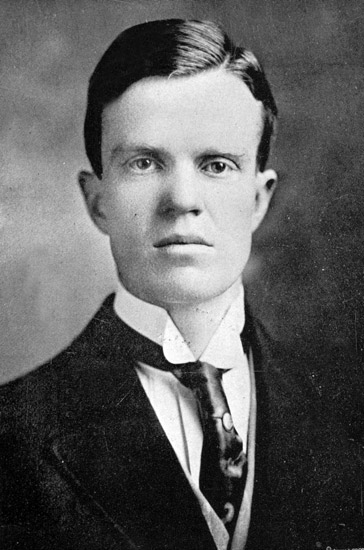

Nominee	Charles Hillman Brough	Wallace Townsend	William Davis
Party	Democratic	Republican	Socialist
Popular vote	122,041	43,963	9,730
Percentage	69.44%	25.02%	5.54%
- County results Brough: 50–60% 60–70% 70–80% 80–90% Townsend: 50–60%
Governor before election
George Washington Hays
Democratic
Elected Governor
Charles Hillman Brough
Democratic

The 1916 Arkansas gubernatorial election was held on November 7, 1916.

Incumbent Democratic Governor George Washington Hays did not seek a third term.

Democratic nominee Charles Hillman Brough defeated Republican nominee Wallace Townsend and Socialist nominee William Davis with 69.44% of the vote.

== Democratic primary ==
The Democratic primary election was held on March 29, 1916.

=== Candidates ===
==== Declared ====
- Charles Hillman Brough, former professor at the University of Arkansas
- Earle W. Hodges, incumbent Secretary of State of Arkansas
- Lewis Cass "Shotgun" Smith, judge

==== Withdrew ====
- Thomas Chipman McRae, former U.S. Representative

=== Results ===
Democratic primary results
Party	Candidate	Votes	%
Democratic	Charles Hillman Brough	48,892	42.11
Democratic	L. C. Smith	34,918	30.08
Democratic	Earle W. Hodges	32,292	27.81
Total votes		116,102	100.00

Contemporary sources indicate the vote was higher than stated here, with one stating the official vote was Brough 59,676, Smith 44,024, Hodges 41,456.

== General election ==
=== Candidates ===
- Charles Hillman Brough, Democratic
- Wallace Townsend, Republican, attorney
- William Davis, Socialist

=== Results ===
1916 Arkansas gubernatorial election
Party	Candidate	Votes	%	±%
Democratic	Charles Hillman Brough	122,041	69.44%	−0.03%
Republican	Wallace Townsend	43,963	25.02%	+2.19%
Socialist	William Davis	9,730	5.54%	−2.16%
Majority		78,078	44.42%	
Turnout		175,734	100.00%	
Democratic hold		Swing		

== Bibliography ==
- Gubernatorial Elections, 1787-1997. Washington, D.C.: Congressional Quarterly Inc. 1998. ISBN 1-56802-396-0.
- Glashan, Roy R. (1979). American Governors and Gubernatorial Elections, 1775-1978. Meckler Books. ISBN 0-930466-17-9.
