= Christopher D. Price =

American theologian (born 1976)

- Born: May 3, 1976 (age 49); San Diego, California, United States
- Occupations: Pastor, theologian, author
- Spouse: Denise (Foster) Price (m. 1999)
- Children: Remington Price

Christopher D. Price (born May 3, 1976 in San Diego, California) is an American conservative Baptist pastor, theologian, and writer. He is currently serving as Lead Pastor of Northside Baptist Church in Garland, Texas.

== Education ==
Price's academic qualifications include prerequisite studies at Angelina College and Jacksonville College. He also earned a Bachelor's degree in Religion from Baptist Missionary Association Theological Seminary in 2006 and a Master's Religion from Baptist Missionary Association Theological Seminary in 2007.

=== Religious credentials ===
Price was licensed for ministry at Calvary Baptist Church, Crockett, Texas in September 1998 and later ordained to the Pastoral Ministry by Carlos Missionary Baptist Church, Carlos, Texas on June 26, 2005. He has successfully ministered to congregations in the Southern Baptists of Texas Convention (SBTC) and the Baptist Missionary Association of America (B.M.A.A.) While at the BMATS he was recognized for this scholastic achievements placed on the Dean's List.

== Family ==
Chris wed Denise Foster Price on June 26, 1998 in Crockett, Texas with Lynn Stephens officiating. This union was blessed with their only daughter, Remington, born September 2, 1999.

== Ministry ==
- August 2008 – present: Northside Baptist Church, Garland, Texas - Lead Pastor
- July 2006 – August 2008: Pine Grove Baptist Church, Diboll, TX - Pastor
- March 2005 – June 2006: Carlos Missionary Baptist Church, Carlos, TX - Pastor
- August 2004 – March 2005: Pulpit Supply
- 2003–2004: Central Baptist Church, Crockett, TX - Youth Team Leader
- 2001–2002: West Side Baptist Church, Crockett, TX - Youth Pastor
- 1999–2000: North Side Baptist Church, Mineola, Texas - Pastor of Youth & Outreach
