= 1918 Arkansas gubernatorial election =

- November 5, 1918
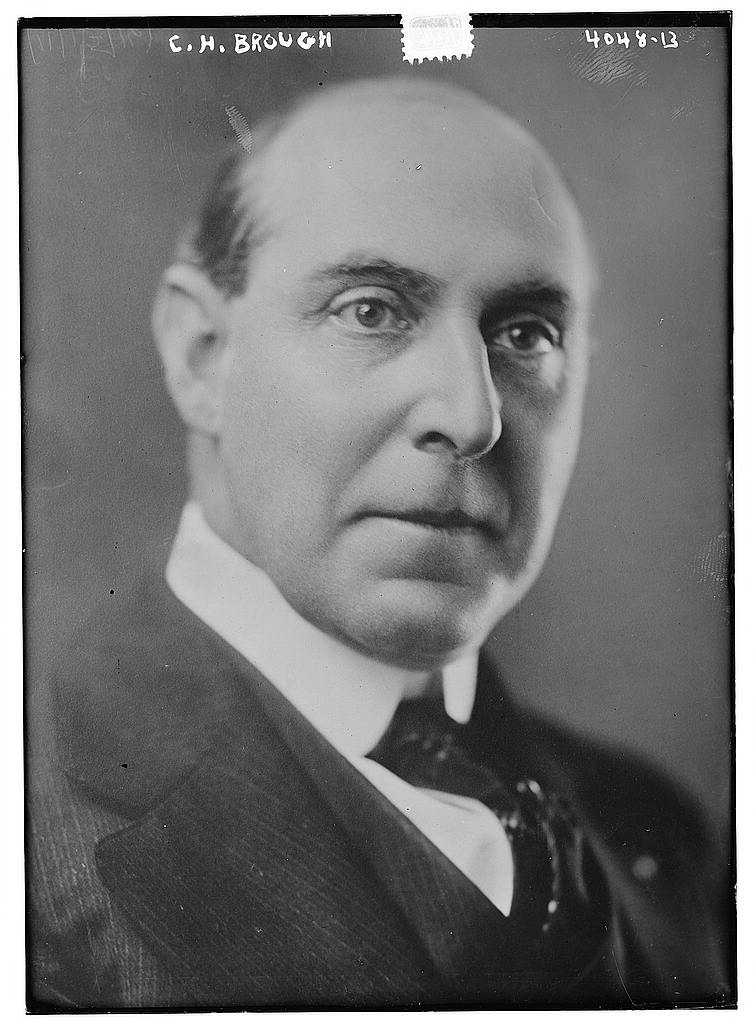

Nominee	Charles Hillman Brough	Clay Fulks
Party	Democratic	Socialist
Popular vote	68,192	4,792
Percentage	93.43%	6.57%
- County results Brough: 80–90% >90%
Governor before election
Charles Hillman Brough
Democratic
Elected Governor
Charles Hillman Brough
Democratic

The 1918 Arkansas gubernatorial election was held on November 5, 1918.

Incumbent Democratic Governor Charles Hillman Brough won re-election to a second term, defeating Socialist nominee Clay Fulks with 93.43% of the vote.

== Democratic primary ==
The Democratic primary election was held on May 28, 1918.

=== Candidates ===
- Charles Hillman Brough, incumbent Governor
- Lewis Cass "Shotgun" Smith, judge

=== Results ===
Democratic primary results
Party	Candidate	Votes	%
Democratic	Charles Hillman Brough (incumbent)	102,383	66.84
Democratic	L. C. Smith	50,791	33.16
Total votes		153,174	100.00

== Socialist nomination ==
=== Candidate ===
- Clay Fulk, of Searcy

=== Withdrew ===
- Dan Hogan, Socialist candidate for Governor in 1906, 1910 and 1914

== General election ==
=== Candidates ===
- Charles Hillman Brough, Democratic
- Clay Fulks, Socialist

The Republican Party did not field a candidate and endorsed Brough.

=== Results ===
1918 Arkansas gubernatorial election
Party	Candidate	Votes	%	±%
Democratic	Charles Hillman Brough (incumbent)	68,192	93.43%	+23.99%
Socialist	Clay Fulks	4,792	6.57%	+1.03%
Majority		63,400	86.86%	
Turnout		72,984	100.00%	
Democratic hold		Swing		

== Bibliography ==
- Gubernatorial Elections, 1787-1997. Washington, D.C.: Congressional Quarterly Inc. 1998. ISBN 1-56802-396-0.
- Glashan, Roy R. (1979). American Governors and Gubernatorial Elections, 1775-1978. Meckler Books. ISBN 0-930466-17-9.

]
