= Governor Brough =

Governor Brough may refer to:

- Charles Hillman Brough (1876–1935), 25th Governor of Arkansas
- John Brough (1811–1865), 26th Governor of Ohio
