= Malta, Texas =

- Unincorporated community
- Location within Texas Location within the United States
- Coordinates: 33°29′17″N 94°31′20″W
- Country: United States
- State: Texas
- County: Bowie
- Elevation: 410 ft (120 m)
- Time zone: UTC-6 (Central (CST))
  - Summer (DST): UTC-5 (CDT)
- Area codes: 903 & 430
- GNIS feature ID: 1362124

Malta is an unincorporated community in Bowie County, Texas, United States. According to the Handbook of Texas, the community had a population of 297 in 1990. It is part of the Texarkana metropolitan area.

== History ==
On April 30, 1954, an F3 tornado struck Malta.

== Geography ==
Malta is located on the Missouri Pacific Railroad line on U.S. Highway 82, 6 mi (9.7 km) west of New Boston and 5 mi (8.0 km) east of DeKalb in northwestern Bowie County.

=== Climate ===
The climate in this area is characterized by hot, humid summers and generally mild to cool winters. According to the Köppen Climate Classification system, Malta has a humid subtropical climate, abbreviated "Cfa" on climate maps.

== Education ==
The Malta Independent School District serves area students.

== Notable person ==
- D. N. Jackson, a Baptist pastor who founded the Baptist Missionary Association of America, ministered in Malta.
