= Interstate and Foreign Landmark Missionary Baptist Association =

Organized in 1951 as the Interstate and Foreign Missionary Baptist Associational Assembly of America, this group is now known as the Interstate and Foreign Landmark Missionary Baptist Association of America. Their purpose is to encourage fellowship among Missionary Baptist churches that practice ministerial support by freewill offerings. Since they do not believe in stipulated salaries for pastors and missionaries, they are also known as "Faithway Baptists".

Churches of this association originally fellowshipped with the American Baptist Association. A split in the American Baptist Association (organized 1924) resulted in the formation of two new national associations - the Baptist Missionary Association of America (then called North American Baptist Association) and the Interstate and Foreign Landmark Missionary Baptist Association. All three of these associations adhere to the Landmark principle of a succession of Baptist churches from the time of Christ to the present.

Doctrinally, the churches of the Interstate and Foreign Landmark Missionary Baptist Association hold that Christ died for all men; salvation is by grace through faith; the saved are eternally secure; the church is local only and was organized by Christ while He was on earth; baptism by immersion and the Lord's supper are church ordinances; foot washing is to be performed in church capacity; ministerial support must be by freewill offerings; and the Great Commission is given to local churches only.

The association work consists of local churches recommending their missionaries to other churches. All decisions to support missionaries are made by the churches in their own business meetings. Local churches sponsor and directly support all missionary, benevolent, and educational work.

In 1951, forty churches were represented at the organization. In 2000, there were 135 churches in the association, with a membership of 14,945. Some fellowshipping churches represent in local and state associations but not in the general association. The total number of Faithway Baptist churches meeting in associations is 168 with over 30,000 members. Most of the churches are concentrated in Alabama, Arkansas, Florida, Louisiana, Mississippi, and Texas; but affiliated churches also are present outside the United States in Mexico, Nicaragua, the Philippines, Quebec, Canada, and South Korea. Twelve foreign, six interstate, and two radio missionaries were recommended by their churches (2000). A paper, "The Voice of Faith", is published by the Pine Missionary Baptist Church, Franklinton, Louisiana. Faith Way Sunday School Literature is printed by Palestine Missionary Baptist Church of Wilmer, Alabama.
