= Ben M. Bogard =

Baptist minister and theologian (1868–1951)

The Reverend Ben M. Bogard
- Born: Benjamin Marcus Bogard; March 9, 1868; Elizabethtown, Kentucky, U.S.
- Died: May 29, 1951 (aged 83); Little Rock, Arkansas, U.S.
- Resting place: Roselawn Memorial Park, Little Rock, Arkansas, U.S.
- Education: Georgetown College; Bethel College
- Occupations: Baptist minister; theologian
- Known for: Landmarkism; Founding the American Baptist Association
- Spouse: Lynn Oneida Meacham Owen (m. 1868, died)
- Children: 2

Benjamin Marcus Bogard (March 9, 1868 – May 29, 1951) was a Baptist minister and theologian from the United States. In 1924, Bogard participated in founding the American Baptist Association. In 1928, Bogard successfully pushed for an Arkansas state law which banned the teaching of the theory of evolution in public schools; the law was overturned by the United States Supreme Court in 1968, seventeen years after Bogard's death. He was a chief proponent of the Landmark Movement, which attributes an unbroken continuity and legitimacy to the Baptist churches since Apostolic times.

== Early life and education ==
Bogard was the only son of six children born to M. L. and Nancy Bogard in Elizabethtown in central Kentucky. The Bogards were tenant farmers who raised tobacco as their cash crop. In 1873, the Bogards moved to Caseyville in Union County in western Kentucky. There he attended school and the nearby Woodland Baptist Church, still in existence in Morganfield, Kentucky. Young Bogard was also a frequent participant in religious camp meetings. In the spring of 1913, Caseyville was destroyed by an Ohio River flood and not rebuilt.

During a church service in February 1885, the teenaged Bogard was baptized in an icy pond, a signal of his faith in Jesus Christ. In 1887 and 1888, he attended Georgetown College in Georgetown, Scott County, north of Lexington, Kentucky. In 1887, he was ordained as a Baptist minister.

After Georgetown, he pursued further studies at Bethel College in Russellville, also formerly known as Russellville Male Academy. Located in Logan County in south Kentucky, the institution closed in 1964. Though he was called "Dr. Bogard", the title was ceremonial.

In 1891, Bogard married Lynn Oneida Meacham Owen (1868–1952), a native of Christian County in southwestern Kentucky, and the widow of Frazier Westley Owen Jr. (1867–1889). Both were twenty-three; she had a three-year-old daughter, Lela Owen, who was born in 1888. The Bogards had a son together, Douglas Bogard.

From 1892 to 1898, Bogard was the pastor of several churches in Kentucky and Missouri.

== Theological debates ==
In 1895, while a pastor in Fulton in far southwestern Kentucky, Bogard edited for two years The Baptist Flag, the first of several denominational papers in his future. In Fulton, he met John Newton Hall, a proponent of the Landmark Baptist movement, which emphasizes a literal interpretation of chapter and verse. Bogard defended Landmarkism in his scholarly writings and in 237 debates between 1908 and 1948, in which he was engaged during his ministerial career. Bogard has been described by his biographer as "the personification of polemics, engaging the political, cultural, and religious issues of his day."

In his 1934 debate with Aimee Semple McPherson, founder of the International Church of the Foursquare Gospel, he proclaimed, "Miracles and divine healing, as taught and manifested in the Word of God, ceased with the closing of the apostolic age" in the year A.D. 70, after which overt miracles were no longer performed on earth. Pentecostals and other charismatic denominations maintain that miracles continue until the Second Coming of Jesus Christ. In 1900, Bogard published through a Baptist press in Louisville, Kentucky, Pillars of Orthodoxy, or Defenders of the Faith, a biographical anthology of important Baptist figures. Bogard was an unyielding critic of ecumenism within the religious community, unwilling to compromise for the sake of unity what he considered unchanging tenets of the faith.

In his debate with Church of Christ theologian Joseph Sale Warlick, from John 10:27-30, Bogard argued that a Christian who falls into sinful behavior still retains eternal security because of the sacrificial death of Jesus Christ on the cross and subsequent Resurrection, which are greater than an individual's imperfection. Bogard's critics countered that his view of eternal security conflicts with Ezekiel 33:13: "if he trust to his righteousness, and commit iniquity, none of his righteous deeds shall be remembered; but in his iniquity that he hath committed, therein shall he die." This verse addresses placing trust in one's individual righteousness instead of sole faith in redemption from Christ. Bogard maintained that the blood of the crucified Christ exonerates the sinner whose salvation is assured at the time of repentance.

In 1938, Bogard debated the Church of Christ theologian Nicholas Brodie Hardeman of Henderson, Tennessee, on the nature of the Holy Spirit as the third part of the Trinity and in regard to baptism and falling from grace, the latter which Bogard-style Baptists consider impossible.

When Clarence Darrow came to Little Rock to defend Darwinism, Bogard criticized the secularism of the Chicago lawyer but was unable to shake Darrow's confidence in acceptance of the theoretical work of Charles Darwin. Clay Fulks, socialist critic of the conservative order, employed ridicule to deride Bogard:

[Bogard] cravenly permitted the Wicked One [Darrow] to come right into the fold among his flock -- and maybe devour some of his little ewe lambs! ... Brother Ben, you cannot hope to escape the consequences of your pusillanimous negligence by hiding behind the times. ... [God] probably sent the ogre Darrow down to Little Rock just to try your faith. Then you had your opportunity. But instead of rising to it nobly, as Calvin rose to his when God sent Servetus to Geneva, you cowered in the background and failed ignominiously. Now you whine about the times."

Though Bogard would presumably have mostly agreed on matters of faith and biblical interpretation with J. Frank Norris, the controversial Baptist fundamentalist figure from Fort Worth, he claimed that Norris was vain and prone to exaggerate his own ministerial success. Though he accused Norris of failing to preach the fundamentals of the faith, the two in time developed a grudging friendship. Bogard said, "When I get to heaven I expect to find Frank Norris there in spite of that wicked streak that runs through him." Norris accepted and publicly defended dispensational premillennialism, an eschatological perspective with which Bogard disagreed even though it found traction in the American Baptist Association, which Bogard had organized. In 1941, Norris faced a $25,000 libel judgment rendered in San Antonio, Texas, payable to another Baptist minister, R. E. White, because of remarks about White in a Detroit, Michigan, denominational paper, The Fundamentalist. The publicity about the suit weakened Norris' hold over his fellow fundamentalists.

Bogard taught that since the time of Jesus on earth there has been a succession of churches teaching the Missionary Baptist view of Scripture even if those churches had been called by other names. Some refer to this teaching as "the faith once delivered unto the saints." Christ spoke of establishing His church and "the gates of hell shall not prevail against it." Missionary Baptists, like other denominations too, believe that their denomination is that original church.

== Arkansas years ==
In 1901, Bogard became the editor and half-owner of the Arkansas Baptist newspaper. Three years later, he secured editorial control of the publication. In 1905, he left the Southern Baptist Convention to become for nineteen years, as it developed, an Independent Baptist. Nearly two decades later, he worked to establish the ABA, or the Missionary Baptist denomination, which dispatches missionaries not through an associational body like the SBC authorizes but through individual churches.

In 1899, Bogard came to Arkansas. For his first four years there, he was the pastor of First Baptist Church in Searcy in White County near the capital city of Little Rock. Between 1903 and 1909, he was the pastor of First Baptist Church in Argenta, now North Little Rock in Pulaski County. Then he preached independently in revivals and crusades in seven states. In 1914, he moved to Texarkana in Miller County, Arkansas, where he founded The Baptist Commoner. In 1917, he merged The Baptist Commoner with the Arkansas Baptist to create The Baptist and Commoner. In 1920, he assumed his final pastorate at Antioch Missionary Baptist Church in Little Rock, where he remained until retirement in 1947. At the time, no Missionary Baptist pastor earned more than the $100 gross monthly salary paid to Bogard by Antioch Church.

During the 1920s, Bogard joined the Ku Klux Klan, which targeted in that phase of its existence foreigners and Roman Catholics. Bogard claimed that the theory of evolution had contributed to the moral decline of the United States. In 1926, Bogard joined with Doss Nathan Jackson to write Evolution: Unscientific and Unscriptural, which claims that Darwin's's theory causes discouraged persons to turn to atheism and Bolshevism. Bogard and Jackson subsequently broke fellowship when Jackson's father-in-law, C. A. Gilbert, the chairman of the Missionary Baptist Sunday School Committee, was blamed for a deficit. For a decade Bogard tried to remove Gilbert as the committee chairman. In 1950, Jackson left the Missionary Baptist denomination and started the Baptist Missionary Association of America, formerly the North American Baptist Association.

In 1927, the Arkansas State Senate tabled an anti-evolution bill. Bogard led a petition drive to place the issue on the ballot as Initiated Act No. 1 in the general election held on November 6, 1928. In the campaign Bogard unexpectedly found himself defending the right of free speech of Charles Lee Smith, the founder and president of the since defunct American Association for the Advancement of Atheism who opposed the initiated act and had been charged with blasphemy while distributing atheist literature in Little Rock. Bogard was convinced that his conservative ideas would prove superior to those of Smith in an honest forum. Arkansas voters defied their state senators and passed the anti-evolution act by a two-to-one margin and also supported the Democratic presidential nominee Al Smith, the governor of New York, though Bogard had been among the southern clergy who opposed this first ever Catholic nominee of a major party despite U.S. Senator Joseph T. Robinson of Arkansas being tapped as Smith's vice-presidential running mate. Even before the term civil rights was widely used, Bogard believed that Al Smith as president would work for equality of African Americans in the still racially segregated American South. Though successful in Arkansas, the Smith-Robinson ticket was defeated by the Republican Hoover-Curtis slate.

== Later life ==
In 1931, Bogard resigned as editor of The Baptist and Commoner. Three years later he launched another denominational newspaper, The Orthodox Baptist Searchlight. Through the Antioch Missionary Baptist Church in Little Rock, Bogard worked to establish the Missionary Baptist Seminary in that city. He became the original dean of the seminary while remaining as the Antioch pastor. Conrad N. Glover (1895–1986) was the first seminary president, with J. Louis Guthrie as vice president.

The seminary observed its eightieth anniversary in 2014; it is housed in current facilities at 5224 Stagecoach Road, which opened in 1979. The seminary filled the void left by the closing of the undergraduate institution, Missionary Baptist College, which had operated from 1919 to 1934 in Sheridan. Glover, a Sheridan native, had also been an administrator at Missionary Baptist College.

== Honors ==
In 1901, he received an honorary Doctor of Divinity from the then Southwest Bible College in Bolivar in Polk County in southwestern Missouri. He subsequently received an honorary degree from the since disbanded Missionary Baptist College in Sheridan in Grant County in southern Arkansas.

Bogard died at his Little Rock home at the age of eighty-three and is interred at Roselawn Memorial Park at 2801 Asher Avenue in Little Rock. He left his estate to Missionary Baptist Seminary and the Bogard Press, named in his honor, operated by the Baptist Bookstore at 4605 North State Line Avenue in Texarkana, Texas. Seminary students took up a collection to buy Bogard a headstone, for he left no funds for that purpose.

In 2006, Luther D. Perdue extracted a large collection of Bogard sermons and lessons between 1915 and 1937.

In addition to Pillars of Orthodoxy, or Defenders of the Faith, Bogard wrote the following books:

- Fifty-two Bible Lesson (1930)
- Smith-Bogard Debate: A Discussion between Eugene S. Smith and Ben M. Bogard (1942)
- The Baptist Way-Book (1946) ISBN 9780892110155
- The Golden Key (1968 reprint)
- Best of Bogard Sermons (1974 reprint)
- W. Curtis Porter and Ben M. Bogard Debate (2013 reprint) ISBN 9781584270430
- The Bible Proved by Science: Refutation of Modernism, Infidelic Skepticism Made Ridiculous (undated)
- The Story of a Sermon with Dan Gilbert (undated)

Bogard was honored by Ripley's Believe It or Not! for having preached for "sixty-one years without missing a single Sunday." His period as an ordained minister extended from 1887 to 1951, or sixty-four years; presumably his sixty-one years without missing a Sunday were from 1890 to 1951 or maybe 1889 to 1950.
