= D. N. Jackson =

Baptist minister and theologian (1895–1968)

The Reverend Doss N. Jackson
- Born: Doss Nathan Jackson; July 14, 1895; Malta, Texas, U.S.
- Died: November 29, 1968 (aged 73); Oklahoma City, Oklahoma, U.S.
- Education: Jacksonville College (BA)
- Occupations: Baptist minister; theologian
- Known for: Landmarkism; Founding the American Baptist Association and the Baptist Missionary Association of America
- Spouse: Erma O. Gilbert (m. 1872, died)
- Children: 3
- Parent(s): James F. Jackson; Josephine Bridges

Doss Nathan Jackson (July 14, 1895 – November 29, 1968) was a Baptist minister and theologian from the United States. He was a chief proponent of the Landmark Movement, which attributes an unbroken continuity and legitimacy to the Baptist churches since Apostolic times.

== Early life and education ==
Jackson was the son of James Ferguson and Josephine (Bridges) Jackson and the youngest of twelve children. In 1918 he was married to Erma Oretus Gilbert, the daughter of Dr. C. A. Gilbert, The Business Manager of the Baptist Sunday School Committee in Texarkana, Arkansas. Dr. and Mrs. Jackson had three children: Dr. Tillman Sherron (T.S.) Jackson, Carroll F. Jackson and Mrs. Ermagene (Jean) S.T. Sullivan. He received a Bachelor of Arts degree from Jacksonville College in 1917.

His denominational work began in 1918 when, as a 23-year-old pastor, the General Association of Baptists in the United States of America elected him editor-in-chief of the Baptist Sunday School Committee. C. A. Gilbert, who became Jackson's father-in-law the same year, was elected business manager at the same meeting. A movement began to unify various state and regional associations of missionary Baptists into a national association – a scope which the General Association apparently never enjoyed. He later had a LLD degree conferred by the Missionary Baptist College in Sheridan, Arkansas. Jackson studied at Moody Bible Institute, Chicago, in 1920–21 and did graduate work at Princeton University in 1925–26. The result of the movement was the forming of the American Baptist Association in 1924. He served on the committee which drafted the constitution for the new Baptist association. He was the ABA president from 1935 to 1937 and held the position of editor-in-chief from 1924 to 1942.

Jackson and his then friend Ben M. Bogard claimed that the Darwinian theory of evolution had contributed to the moral decline of the United States and caused discouraged persons to embrace atheism and Bolshevism. Accordingly, in 1926, Bogard and Jackson joined to pen Evolution: Unscientific and Unscriptural. Bogard and Jackson subsequently broke fellowship when C. A. Gilbert, the chairman of the Missionary Baptist Sunday School Committee, was blamed for a deficit. For a decade Bogard tried to remove Jackson's father-in-law as the committee chairman. In 1950, Jackson left the Missionary Baptist denomination and started the Baptist Missionary Association of America, formerly the North American Baptist Association.

Jackson, however, was never the president of the Baptist Missionary Association of America, but he was elected one of two vice-presidents in 1955, and was given the honor of preaching the annual message on two occasions. In 1951, Jackson preached the annual message for the association meeting in Laurel, Mississippi, while his friend, Gerald D. Kellar presided. Jackson also drafted the original Doctrinal Statement of the association. and served as the first promotional secretary.

== Ministry ==
=== Pastorates ===
Dr. Jackson was ordained on September 2, 1913.

- First Baptist Church, Jefferson, Texas, 1917–18
- County Avenue Baptist Church, Texarkana, 1918-34 (four years on leave of absence for school studies at Princeton and Chicago)*Organized and pastored Central Baptist Church, Texarkana, 1934–40
- Parkview Baptist Church, Laurel, Mississippi in 1940
- Malta, Texas
- Fulton, Arkansas
- Emmanuel Baptist Church, Nashville, Arkansas
- Calvary Baptist Church, Fayetteville, Arkansas.
- Park Place Baptist Church, Little Rock, Arkansas, in the fall of 1949
- Berean Baptist Church, Memphis, Tennessee
- Creston Hills Baptist Church, Jackson, Mississippi
- Walston Springs Baptist Church, Palestine, Texas
- Pine Grove Baptist Church, Diboll, Texas
- His last pastorate was First Baptist Church, Mixon, Texas (now called "First Missionary Baptist Church" after a different Baptist group used the name "First Baptist in the town".)

=== Pedagogy ===
In 1952 Southeastern Baptist College was organized with Dr. Jackson as its first President. In Arkansas he provided the leadership for purchasing the property for Conway Baptist College, now known as the Central Baptist College, Conway. He served the school's first President also. He played a significant role in the organization and development of the North American Theological Seminary (now Baptist Missionary Association Theological Seminary.) Dr. Jackson was offered a life-time professorship at North American (BMA) Theological Seminary. He became Professor of Theology and Church History and remained with the seminary from 1955 to 1967. He also served as President of Midwestern Baptist College, Oklahoma City from 1967 until his death a year later.

=== Publishing ===
He was editor and publisher of the American Baptist, the oldest Baptist paper west of the Mississippi, from 1934 until his death. The paper was founded in St. Louis in 1875 by D. B. Ray, Sr. Jackson later sold the American Baptist to a group of BMAA pastors.

=== Debates ===
Debates between denominational representatives were popular in the late 19th and early 20th centuries. Jackson was widely used as a debater in earlier years, defending the Baptist faith. He is credited with engaging in at least 162 formal debates, mostly with "Christians" (i.e., "Church of Christ"), from 1916 to 1957. Many of them were in Arkansas, Texas and Oklahoma, but he also debated in Mississippi, Missouri, California and Michigan. A partial list includes

- Jesse T. Lashlee (Church of Christ); 1916
- W. Curtis Porter (Church of Christ); Monette, Arkansas; 1916; baptism; Porter's 1st debate
- J. T. Riley (Reorganized Church of Jesus Christ of Latter Day Saints); Tapp school house (near Fisher), Arkansas; January 8-?, 1918; general church; 12 sessions
- Thomas Wiley Croom (Church of Christ); County Line, Arkansas; January 1922; apostasy, Holy Spirit, baptism; Croom's first debate
- John W. Hedge (Church of Christ); Bearden, Arkansas; 1926 and 127 on the topic of salvation
- G. C. Brewer (Church of Christ); Texarkana, _; c 1931
- Glen Earl Green (Church of Christ)
- W. L. Oliphant (Church of Christ); Hollis, Oklahoma; 1933
- J. D. Tant (Church of Christ); 5 times including in Texarkana, Texas; fall 1933
- Charles B. Middleton (Church of Christ); 1938
- Jesse Powell (Church of Christ); Jacksonville, Texas; 1938
- Clyde L. Embrey (Church of Christ); Texarkana, Arkansas; c 1938
- George B. Curtis (Church of Christ); Fayetteville, Arkansas; 1938
- Guy N. Woods (Church of Christ); Wellington, Texas; c 1938
- Thomas L. Conner (Church of Christ); Bald Knob, Arkansas, 1939
- Guy N. Woods (Church of Christ); Independence, Texas; c 1939
- W. Curtis Porter (Church of Christ); Rush Springs, Oklahoma; September 1939; their 2nd debate
- J. Porter Wilhite (Church of Christ); Burnsville, MS
- Leroy Garrett (Church of Christ); 1940 and again in Taylor, Arkansas; 1941
- John O'Dowd (Church of Christ); Sand Flat, Texas; February 11–14, 1941; establishment of Baptist Church
- Coleman Overby (Church of Christ); Bearden, Arkansas; 1941
- Clyde L. Embrey (Church of Christ); 1941
- Eugene S. Smith (Church of Christ); written; 1944; depravity & operation of the Spirit.
- Thomas L. Conner (Church of Christ); Deering, Missouri; 1944
- Eugene S. Smith (Church of Christ); written; 1945; baptism.
- W. Curtis Porter (Church of Christ); Flint, Michigan; September 18–21, 1945; baptism, apostasy; their 3rd debate, and the again in Poplar Bluff, Missouri; May 7-?, 1946 and at St. Louis, Missouri; November 18–21, 1946; baptism, apostasy
- Roy E. Cogdill (Church of Christ) twice including in Lufkin, Texas; December 10–13, 1946.
- J. Porter Wilhite (Church of Christ); 1947 and again in Laurel, MS; March 1949; establishment of church, baptism
- G. C. Brewer (Church of Christ); Fulton, MS; May 9–12, 1950; baptism, apostasy
- J. Porter Wilhite (Church of Christ); Burnsville, MS; 1950; establishment of church, baptism
- Roy E. Cogdill (Church of Christ); Houston, Texas; March 26–29, 1951
- W. Curtis Porter (Church of Christ); Fulton, MS; June 18–20, 1952; establishment of church, apostasy, faith only
- W. Curtis Porter (Church of Christ); Fillmore, Oklahoma; November 4-?, 1952 and in Jonesboro, Arkansas; December 9-?, 1952
- Clyde L. Embrey (Church of Christ); Lucedale, MS; December 6–9, 1955
- John W. Wilson (Church of Christ); Bellflower, California; September 17–20, 1956; baptism, apostasy; Jackson's 161st debate
- Guy N. Woods (Church of Christ); Sikeston, Missouri; late August 1957

Jackson also served as moderator for many debates. Two notable ones include:

- Harold F. Sharp, Sr vs. Dr. J.E. Cobb at Conway, Arkansas (1954).
- Aimee Semple McPherson vs. Dr. Ben M. Bogard at the McPherson Tabernacle in the city of North Little Rock, Pulaski County, Arkansas, on the 22nd day of May, 1934.

=== Preaching ===
through his preaching ministry Dr. Jackson was able to see many lives changed and many professions of faith, but on one Easter morning his ministry produced a new response. The words that flowed from that pulpit on that Resurrection Sunday caused Luther G. Presley to pick up a pen and compose, "I'll Have A New Life" after he heard a sermon by Dr. D.N. Jackson.

=== Theology ===
Perpetuity of the church is a doctrine which is cherished by Missionary Baptists. By perpetuity is meant that there has never been a day since Christ founded His church when there was no scriptural church upon earth. The church shall continue in existence until He shall come again. Church "succession" is another term which denotes perpetuity, implying that churches have succeeded in all ages the one founded by Christ. Baptists believe in a succession of churches---not of the apostles, as taught by the Roman doctrine of ‘apostolic succession.

Baptism is one way of making a confession of faith in Christ. Scriptural baptism is performed by the authority of the triune God (Matthew 28:19-20). No one without baptism is qualified for membership in a church, but baptism does not wholly qualify him. It is the ceremonial qualification he is required to meet. It is the first act of Christian obedience after one's profession, although one may have the opportunity to witness for Christ as Saviour before he is baptized.

== Publications ==
Dr. Jackson was a prolific writer of books, pamphlets, tracts, news articles and study courses.

- The Doctrine of Divine Election: Calvinism and Arminianism Examined
- Jackson-Smith debate: The plan of salvation
- Are We Missionary Baptists? Laurel, Mississippi.: American Baptist Publishing Company, n.d.
- The Lord's Supper: A Sermon Preached at the Race Street Baptist Church, Searcy, Arkansas, February 3, 1935. Texarkana, Texas-Arkansas: D. N. Jackson, n.d.
- Studies in Baptist Church Doctrines and History. Little Rock, Arkansas: Baptist Publications Committee, n.d.
- Ten Reasons Why I Am a Baptist. 2d. Ed. Memphis, Tennessee, and Little Rock, Arkansas: American Baptist Publishing Company, n.d.
- Conventionism Refuted, with Bogard, Ben M.; Ballard, L. S.; Matheny, M.P., Texarkana, Arkansas-Texas: Baptist Sunday School Committee, 1927.
- The Cogdill-Jackson Debate 1949
- The Roger Williams Memorial
- Evolution, Unscientific and Unscriptural. A Short Treatise on the Philosophy of Evolution
- National Danger in Roman Catholicism
- Fifty-two New Testament Lessons
- Speaking in Tongues 1941
- Holy Ghost Baptism 1940
- Are we Missionary Baptists?: The identity of the original Missionary Baptists shown by true facts 1970
- Baptist Searchlight
- Baptist Claims Vindicated
- National Danger in Catholicism 1928
- Woman's Sphere and Function
- Baptist Young People's Manual
- The Lord's Supper
- Our Travels to the Holy Land
- The Lakeland Review: A True Account of What Happened at Lakeland, Florida, April 19, 20, 1950
