= Jacksonville College =

Private junior college in Jacksonville, Texas, US

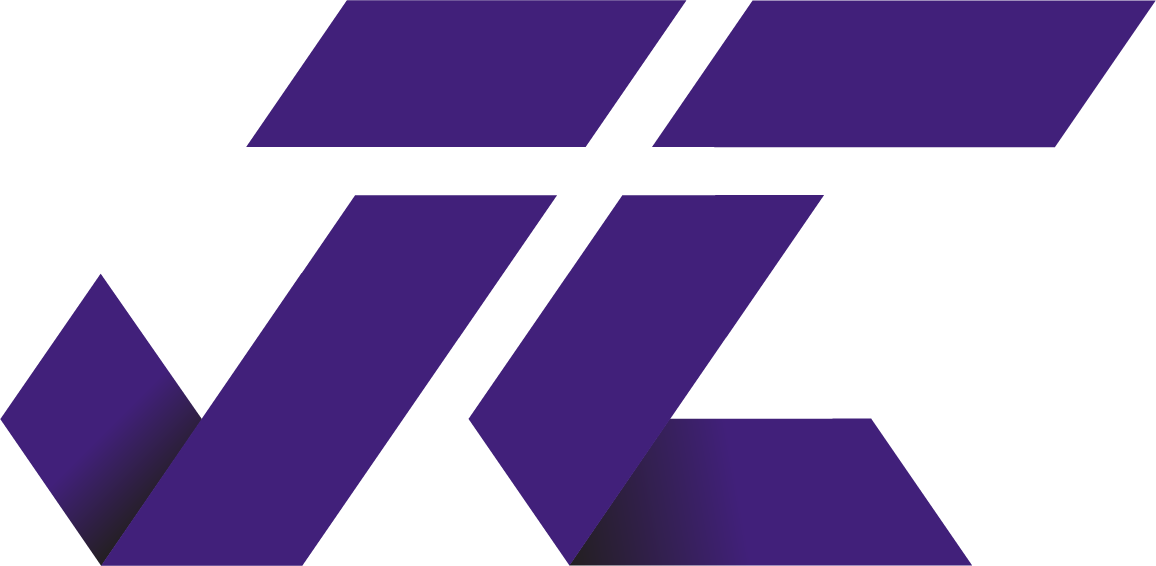
- Type: Private junior college
- Established: 1899
- Accreditation: SACSCOC
- Religious affiliation: Baptist Missionary Association of America
- President: David Erickson
- Students: 575
- Location: Jacksonville, Texas, United States
- Colors: Purple and Gold
- Sporting affiliations: NJCAA Division I
- Mascot: Jaguar
- Website: jacksonvillecollege.edu

Jacksonville College is a private Christian junior college in Jacksonville, Texas, United States. It is the only accredited junior college in Texas that is privately owned and operated, owned by the Baptist Missionary Association of America. The college is accredited by the Southern Association of Colleges and Schools Commission on Colleges. The college's current president is David Erickson, who has served in that capacity since 2023.

The college is known for its choir which consists of a mixed men and women's chorus and a smaller group known as the JC Singers, which lead the worship at the college's chapel services (also known as MLC). The choir travels around the state of Texas promoting the college.

Jacksonville College, the oldest junior college in the state of Texas, opened in 1899 and has operated continuously since that time, though before 1918 it operated as a four-year institution. The college had an enrollment of 575 students as of 2024.

The college believes in the importance of each student making a personal commitment to Christianity, make behavioral changes in Christian applications to 21st century personal, family, community, and global issues, endorse lifelong Christian learning for their vocation, and broaden Biblical literacy.

== History ==
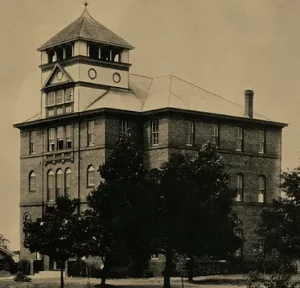
Old Main on the campus of Jacksonville College

In 1899, a group of Baptists in East Texas founded Jacksonville College with the vision of creating a private, Christ-centered educational institution. Supported by the city of Jacksonville, the college opened later that year with 34 students and quickly grew. Initially established as a senior college, it became a junior college in 1918 and currently awards Associate of Arts and Science degrees, along with a junior college diploma. Known for its strong athletic programs, Jacksonville College currently offers men and women sports in cross country, track and field, tennis, golf, and soccer. The college previously competed in basketball, however the program was temporarily suspended in 2024. Over time, the campus expanded to include dorms, classrooms, and athletic facilities, with the original building, Old Main, being replaced by a new chapel in the 1970s.

== Notable alumni ==
Notable alumni of Jacksonville College include:

- Antonio Burks - Professional basketball player
- Johnny Hamilton - Professional basketball player
- Carl Herrera - Professional basketball player
- D. N. Jackson - Theologian
- Eric Kibi - Professional basketball player
- Christopher D. Price - Theologian
