= Billy Martindale =

American professional golfer (1938–2026)

Personal information
- Nationality: United States
- Born: September 10, 1938 Jacksonville, Texas, U.S.
- Died: November 4, 2026 (aged 88)

Career
- Sport: Golf
- College: Southern Methodist University; Texas A&M University
- Status: Professional
- Former tour: PGA Tour

Best results in major championships
- Masters Tournament: DNP
- PGA Championship: T15: 1966
- U.S. Open: T44: 1964
- The Open Championship: DNP

Billy Martindale (September 10, 1938 – November 4, 2026) was an American professional golfer who also had career interests as a white-tailed deer breeder, golf course designer, and oil & gas entrepreneur.

== Early life ==
Martindale was born in Jacksonville, Texas, on September 10, 1938, the son of Margaret (née Pruitt) and William Everett Martindale. He is the older brother of Emmy Award-winning stage, television, and film actress Margo Martindale. He graduated from Jacksonville High School in 1957, where he was an All-State quarterback and All-State golfer.

== Amateur career ==
Prior to his professional golf career, Martindale was an accomplished amateur player. After transferring from Southern Methodist University to Texas A&M University in the middle of his freshman year, he went on to captain the golf team and become an NCAA All-American his junior and senior years, graduating in 1961. After graduation, he served in the Army from 1962 to 1963.

== Professional career ==
After playing a partial season in 1963, Martindale played full-time on the PGA Tour from 1964 to 1968, and was recognized as the PGA's "Sophomore of the Year" in 1965. Late that season, he finished runner-up at the Almaden Open Invitational to South Africa's Bobby Verwey. In his five years on tour, he had three 2nd-place finishes, five 3rd-place finishes, and 35 top-25 finishes. His best finish in a major was a tie for 15th at the 1966 PGA Championship at Firestone Country Club.

After the 1968 season, Martindale left the PGA Tour to partner with Don January to form JanMart Enterprises, a golf course development and design company. Their business partnership lasted until 1979, when January left to join the Senior PGA Tour upon reaching age 50. Concurrently, Martindale also served as the head coach of the Southern Methodist University golf team from 1970 to 1973.

In their 10 years together, Martindale and January developed some 23 courses together, mostly around their home state of Texas. Their most notable course development is Royal Oaks Country Club in Dallas, Texas.

== Death ==
Martindale died from lung disease on November 4, 2026, at the age of 88.
