= Malta Independent School District =

School district in Texas

- Malta, Bowie, Texas

District information
- Grades: PK-8
- Schools: 1

Other information
- Website: http://www.maltaisd.net/

Malta Independent School District is a public school district based in the community of Malta, Texas (USA).

The district has one school that serves students in grades pre-kindergarten through eight.

In 2009, the school district was rated "recognized" by the Texas Education Agency.

The district changed to a four-day school week in fall 2022.
