= Missionary Baptists =

Christian denomination in the United States

- The Christian flag

Regions with significant populations
- American South

Religions
- Christianity

Scriptures
- The Bible

Languages
- English

The Missionary Baptist church is a Christian denomination that emerged in the American South during the late 19th century. Missionary Baptists separated from the Southern Baptist Convention in 1905 due to theological differences. Missionary Baptists believe in the autonomy of local congregations and the view that baptism and church membership are reserved for mature congregants. The defining characteristic remains an insistence on local church autonomy.

In the United States, two sizable Missionary Baptist church associations operate today: the American Baptist Association (ABA), established in 1924, and the Baptist Missionary Association of America (BMAA), established as the North American Baptist Association in 1950. The collective membership totals over a million people.

== History ==
Missionary Baptists grew out of the missionary controversy that divided Southern Baptists in the American South during the late 19th century, with Missionary Baptists (a term used by adherents of the Landmark Movement) following the pro-missions movement position. Those who opposed the innovations became known as "anti-missions" or Primitive Baptists. Since arising in the late 19th-century, the influence of Primitive Baptists waned as "Missionary Baptists became the mainstream".
