= Josiah H. Blount =

American businessman (1860–1938)

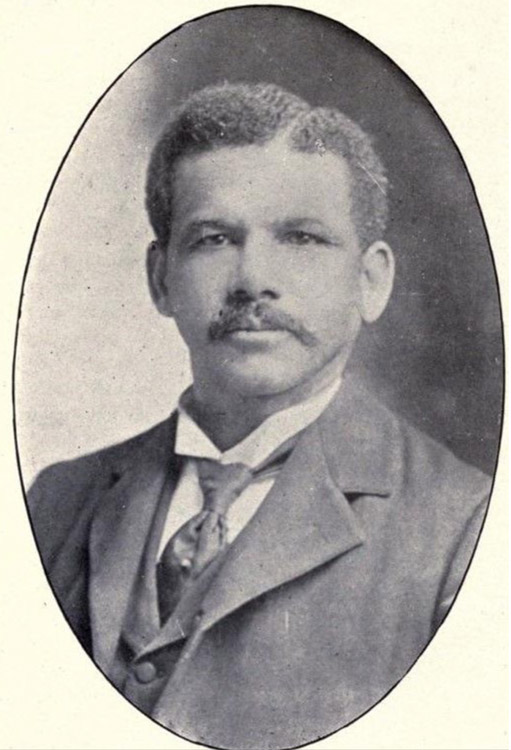
C. 1900-1920

Josiah Homer Blount (September 17, 1860 – December 15, 1938) was an American teacher, farmer, businessman, and fraternal order leader who was the first African-American to run for Governor of Arkansas.

== Early life and education ==
Blount was born into slavery to farmers Madison Blount and Queen Victoria Isabella Lester Blount in Clinton, Georgia. Following Emancipation, Blount was educated in Macon, Georgia, public schools before attending Walden University.

Following his graduation in 1890, Blount relocated to Arkansas where he began a multi-decade career in education as a teacher, principal, and administrator for schools in Texarkana, Hot Springs, Helena, and Forrest City. In addition to being an educator, Blount was a successful farmer and brick maker, eventually managing a brick manufacturing plant in Forrest City.

== Community involvement ==
During World War I, Blount was one of several Black leaders that participated in organizing local chapters of the Arkansas Colored Auxiliary Council of Defense (CACD), a state-level program of the Council of National Defense. Despite resistance and erasure from Arkansas state officials, CACD chapters raised funds, bought war stamps, encouraged food conservation, and sewed clothing for soldiers. The CACD was disbanded following the end of the war in late 1919.

Blount was heavily involved with Mason organizations. He was one of 13 original founding members of the Ancient Egyptian Arabic Order of the Nobles of the Mystic Shrine, a Prince Hall Mason and served as the Deputy Grand Master of the Most Worshipful Sovereign Grand Lodge of Free and Accepted Masons of Arkansas for at least four years, and was a thirty-third-degree Scottish Rite Mason.

== Politics ==
Following service as the chair of the St. Francis County Republican party, Blount put forward his name to run as the Republican nominee for the 1920 Arkansas gubernatorial election. A faction of Republican party politicians who aimed to exclude African Americans from party leadership, known as the "lily whites", prevented this effort by holding the state Republican Convention at the then-segregated Marion Hotel in April 1920. In response, Blount and his supporters (including other respected community leaders like Scipio Africanus Jones) walked out of the event. These men were part of the biracial coalition within the Republican party called the "Black and Tans" that had persisted since Reconstruction. They assembled at the headquarters of the Mosaic Templars of America to hold their own nominating convention and chose Blount as their candidate. The Arkansas secretary of state and later Ku Klux Klan member Thomas Jefferson Terral forced Blount to run as an independent rather than a Republican, and listed him as "negro" on the ballot.

The gubernatorial election was held on November 2, 1920. Democrat Thomas McRae won with 65 percent of the vote. The Republican lily-whites' chosen candidate Wallace Townsend came in second with 24 percent of the vote, and Blount won 15,627 votes, about 8 percent of the vote. Blount outmatched Townsend in fourteen counties, including populous Pulaski County, which contains the state capital of Little Rock.

== Personal life ==
Blount married teacher Justina Almyra Payne in 1892. He died on December 15, 1938, and is buried at Purifoy Cemetery, also known as the Forrest City Cemetery or Forrest City Colored Cemetery.
