= 1922 Arkansas gubernatorial election =

- October 3, 1922
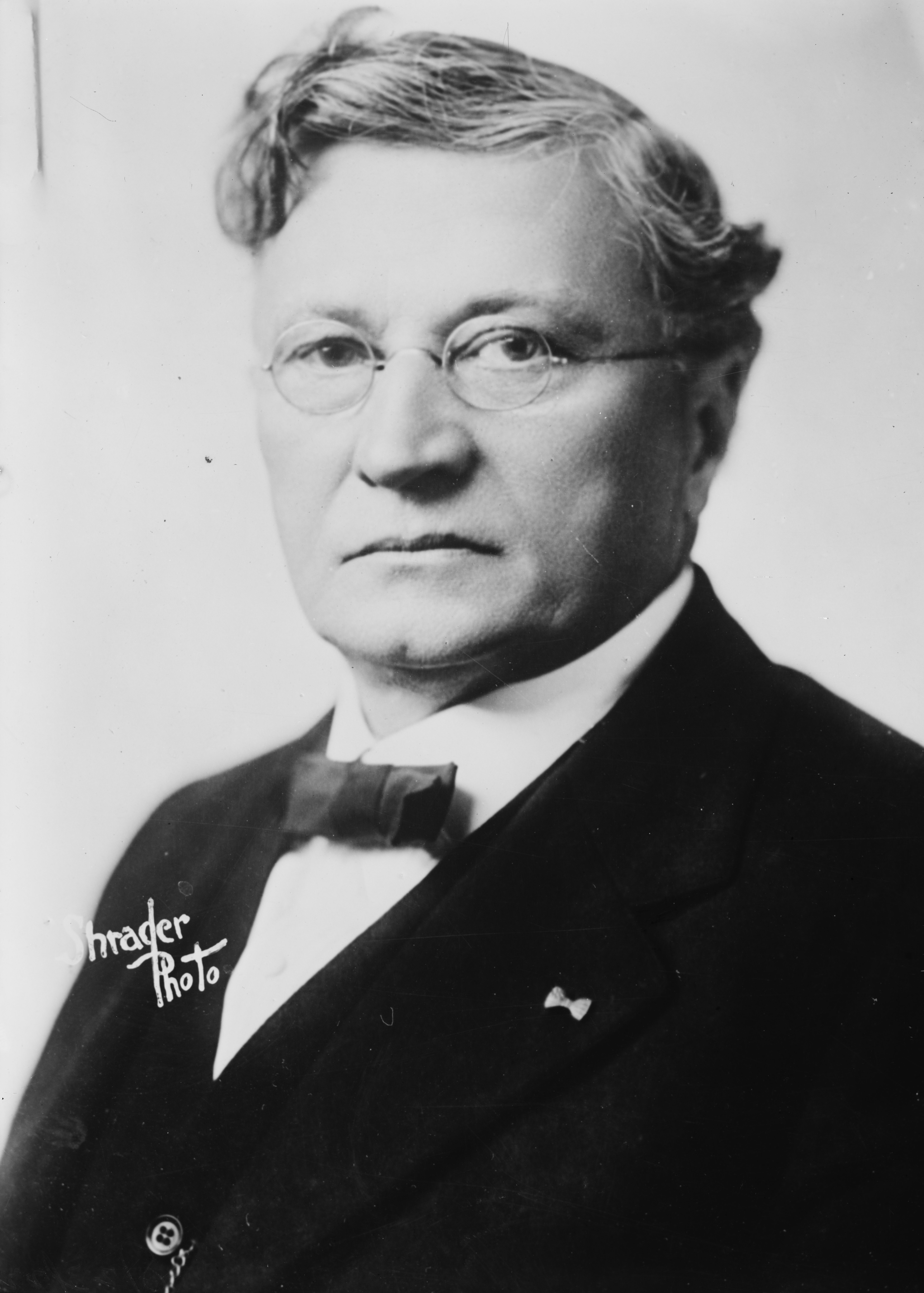

Nominee	Thomas Chipman McRae	John W. Grabiel
Party	Democratic	Republican
Popular vote	99,987	28,055
Percentage	78.09%	21.91%
- County results McRae: 50–60% 60–70% 70–80% 80–90% >90% Grabiel: 50–60%
Governor before election
Thomas Chipman McRae
Democratic
Elected Governor
Thomas Chipman McRae
Democratic

The 1922 Arkansas gubernatorial election was held on October 3, 1922.

Incumbent Democratic Governor Thomas Chipman McRae won re-election to a second term, defeating Republican nominee John W. Grabiel with 78.09% of the vote.

== Democratic primary ==
The Democratic primary election was held on August 8, 1922.

=== Candidates ===
- Thomas Chipman McRae, incumbent Governor
- E. Pink Tony, judge

=== Results ===
Democratic primary results
Party	Candidate	Votes	%
Democratic	Thomas Chipman McRae (incumbent)	127,728	70.45
Democratic	E. Pink Toney	53,572	29.55
Total votes		181,300	100.00

== General election ==
=== Candidates ===
- Thomas Chipman McRae, Democratic
- John W. Grabiel, Republican, lawyer

=== Results ===
1922 Arkansas gubernatorial election (Note: Dubin gives Grabiel's vote as 28,058.)
Party	Candidate	Votes	%	±%
Democratic	Thomas Chipman McRae (incumbent)	99,987	78.09%	
Republican	John W. Grabiel	28,055	21.91%	
Majority		71,932	56.18%	
Turnout		128,042		
Democratic hold		Swing		

== Bibliography ==
- Gubernatorial Elections, 1787–1997. Washington, D.C.: Congressional Quarterly Inc. 1998. ISBN 1-56802-396-0.
- Martin, Mark (2018). Historical Report of the Secretary of State (PDF). Little Rock, Arkansas: Arkansas Secretary of State's Office. ISBN 978-0-692-03553-5.
