= American Baptist Association =

Association of Missionary Baptist churches

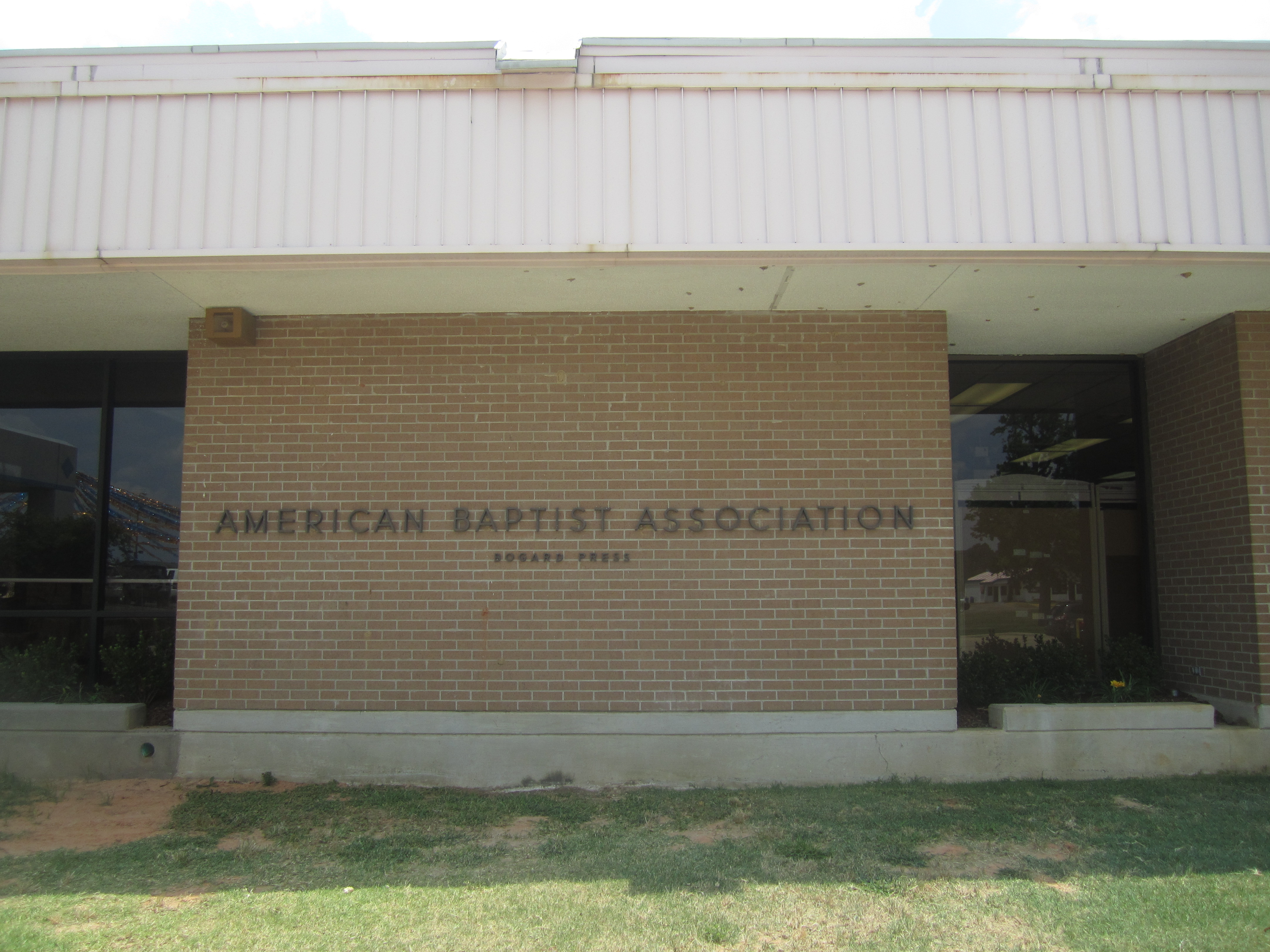
- Baptist Book Store in Texarkana, Texas
- Abbreviation: ABA
- Predecessor: Missionary Baptist General Association
- Established: December 10, 1924 (101 years ago)
- Founders: Eld. Ben M. Bogard; Eld. Doss N. Jackson
- Founded at: Texarkana, Texas
- Type: 501(c)(3), religious organization
- Tax ID no.: 75-6064040
- Headquarters: Texarkana, Texas
- Coordinates: 33.46362°N 94.04427°W
- Region served: Worldwide
- Official language: English
- President: Bro. Micah Carter
- Secessions: Baptist Missionary Association of America
- Website: abaptist.org

The American Baptist Association (ABA), founded in 1924, is a voluntary association of Missionary Baptist churches with its offices and a publishing house located in Texarkana, Texas, United States.

== History ==
=== Background ===
In the 1850s, conservative Baptist preachers spoke out against the tide of progressive, liberal theology and the practice of some Baptist churches in accepting paedobaptism and ecumenism. Missionary T.P. Crawford wrote the booklet Churches to the Front, a call for Baptists to return to scriptural church practices of mission work. J.R. Graves, a prominent Southern Baptist theologian, began writing articles on "returning to the ancient landmarks" in his Tennessee newspaper. It was a call for Southern Baptists to return to what they described as biblical ecclesiology. Graves preached that the ancient view of Baptists was that there was not an invisible, universal church of all the saved. Only local churches had authority to baptize, to administer communion, to send missionaries, and to ordain ministers. The Landmark Baptists called for the convention to give back the authority to local churches in mission work by rejecting the board system and adopting local church sponsored mission work.

At the beginning of the twentieth century, a large portion of Southern Baptists still held to Landmark Movement such as local church autonomy, rejection of alien baptism, and the practice of restricting the ordinance of communion to the members of the local church. These doctrines were debated and argued between fundamental and progressive Baptists. In 1859, there was a push in the Southern Baptist Convention to do away with the SBC Foreign Mission Board. Then, in 1892, T.P. Crawford, a Baptist missionary to China penned the book, Churches to the Front, in which he criticized the board system as an encroachment upon the authority of the local church's commission to carry out mission work.

Gradually separating from the Southern Baptists also due to some Baptist pastors opening their doors to others, accepting baptism from other Protestant churches; some even accepted those who had been baptized as infants. This open-door policy of ecumenicity continued to permeate the Baptist ranks. Methodists, Church of Christ, and preachers from many other denominations were preaching in Baptist pulpits. Landmark Baptist preachers began earnestly speaking out against the practices of ecumenism and the board system of missionary work, stating that these practices violated the sovereignty of church authority and biblical doctrine. They also began to consider themselves the one true church.

=== Formation ===
Pioneers amongst the Landmark Baptists included the Eld. Ben M. Bogard (1868–1951) and Eld. Doss N. Jackson (1895–1968). These two men were instrumental in their state associations of Arkansas and Texas, respectively. The Baptist Missionary Association of Texas was begun in 1900 as a way for sound, Landmark Baptist churches to conduct mission work on a state level away from what was seen as the corruption of the convention board system. This was followed by a departure of the Baptist churches in Arkansas from the convention and founding of the Arkansas Baptist State Association in 1902. In the year 1905, a nationwide association of Landmark Missionary Baptists was formed. It was called the General Association of Baptist Churches. On December 10, 1924, the Baptist Missionary Association of Texas joined this association, and the named was changed to the American Baptist Association.

The first interstate missionaries of the General Association (later the ABA) were sent out in 1905. They were J.A. Scarboro, ministering in Summit, GA, and C.R. Powell who was a missionary in Jacksonville, TX. The first foreign missionaries were I.N. Yohannon, a Jewish missionary to the Jews in Urmia, Persia (present-day Iran); S.M. Jureidini serving in Beirut, Syria; Jennie Edwards serving in Cuba; M.M. Munger, missionary to Mexico, and the following missionaries to the country of China: M.F. Crawford, W.D. King, T.J. League, Charles Tedder, Blanch Rose Walker, D.W. Herring, Alice Herring, L.M. Dawes, J.V. Dawes, G.P. Bostick, T.L. Blalock and Wade Bostick. Po-Chow, An Hwei, Taian Fu and Chining Chow were also supported as national missionaries in China.

According to reported statistics, the American Baptist Association of landmark missionary Baptist churches grew substantially, despite a split with the Baptist Missionary Association of Texas in 1950. In 1935 there were a reported 1,734 preachers, 2,662 churches with a total of 263,484 members. Thirty years later, in 1965 these numbers had grown to 3,150 preachers, 3,227 churches and 726,112 members. The American Baptist Association reached its height of growth in 1980, when they reported an estimated total of 5,700 preachers, 5,000 churches and 1,500,000 total church members. In the 1980s and 1990s these numbers began to drop dramatically, with many churches leaving the association to fellowship with convention churches or independent Baptists. Many other rural churches closed their doors as both population and interest in church declined in the scattered areas where these rural churches existed. By 2009, the American Baptist Association reported that there were 1,700 preachers among 1,600 churches with a total attendance of 100,000 members (Melton). The current numbers represent a remnant of only seven percent of the peak of the association. In 2017, the ABA had 44 interstate missionaries, 36 foreign missionaries, 71 national missionaries, and 10 missionary helpers. In addition, there are many other missionaries sent out by local ABA churches who do not report statistics through the associational mission office.

=== Secessions ===
In 1950, the American Baptist Association annual meeting convened in Lakeland, Florida. That year, a growing rift among the churches concerning church representation by proxy messenger, among other issues, resulted in hundreds of messengers walking out. Those messengers met together in Little Rock, Arkansas and formed the North American Baptist Association, now known as the Baptist Missionary Association of America (BMAA). By 1968, the BMAA reported 3,000 preachers, 1,550 churches with a combined membership of approximately 200,000. According to their website, the association now has 1,300 churches with a membership of 230,000. They support 36 American international missionaries, 29 North American church planters, 680 national missionaries, and 200 support workers. Their main offices are in Conway, Arkansas. Several of the churches that split from the American Baptist Association in 1950 joined to create the Interstate & Foreign Landmark Missionary Baptists Association, commonly referred to as "Faithway Baptists", after the name of their Sunday school literature ministry.

== Doctrine ==
The American Baptist Association hold no official authority over any associating churches. According to their website, "The American Baptist Association is a worldwide group of independent Baptist churches voluntarily associating in their efforts to fulfill the Great Commission. Its organization is designed to be minimal to ensure the complete independence and equal representation of every church in the association." Churches of the American Baptist Association practice a congregational form of church government, with each local church body autonomous and independent of any other ecclesiastical authority.

A key doctrinal position of the churches of the American Baptist Association that sets them apart from many other Baptist groups is the practice of closed communion, also known as "Restricted Lord's Supper," in which the ordinance of communion is restricted to members of the local church body observing the ordinance. This practice precludes both non-believers and non-members from partaking in the ordinance. Closed communion is closely linked with church discipline as found in 1 Corinthians 5:11. The American Baptist Association does not ordain women.

== Membership ==
In 2009, the American Baptist Association reported 1,600 congregations and 100,000 members. The largest number of associated churches are in Arkansas, Florida, Louisiana, Oklahoma, Texas and on the west coast, with churches also in most of the United States. The association also has a presence in several countries outside the United States, most notably Mexico and the Philippine Islands. In 2019, churches from 45 states and 25 countries around the world associated with the American Baptist Association.

== Controversies ==
In the 1960s, the American Baptist Association strongly opposed integration of the races. Described as a hard-core segregationist group, in 1965 church leader James Berry stated "Christian civilization for 1900 years prior to this century held that segregation of the races in social, religious, and marital life is a divine command." Dr. Albert Garner, former president of the association and president of the Florida Baptist Institute and Seminary told president John F. Kennedy that "we have deep moral and religious convictions that integration of the races is morally wrong and should be resisted.

However there continued to be disagreement between churches associating within the ABA over racial integration throughout the years to come. Doctor Joe M. Morell served as the President of the 91st Annual Session of the American Baptist Association. During this session on June 21, 2016, Dr. Morell presented the President's Address titled "Reconcile." Following this address, Dr. Morell offered a hand of reconciliation to the McClung Family and Clark family for historic prejudices in acknowledgement as well as remorse for past convictions. The Messenger Body of the 91st Annual Session of the American Baptist Association stood in agreement of this action. This action intended to acknowledge former hurt while indicating that those in attendance did not hold the same convictions or beliefs as earlier segregationists, welcoming the integration of all ethnicities. Dr. Morell stated "Someone has said, perhaps the most striking insight from Scripture that hits home is this: When Jesus refers to the 'nations' (ethnos), He is not speaking of countries whose borders change with the fickleness of the next war, but rather he is referring to groupings of people which the nation is not determined by political boundaries, but by the language and culture. Jesus says, 'GO to all of them...barring none!'"

== Education ==
There are several seminaries, Bible institutes and colleges associated with the American Baptist Association. Many of these schools are recognized by the American Baptist Association's accrediting body, the American Baptist Association of Theological Schools, (ABATS).
