= 1913 Arkansas gubernatorial special election =

- July 23, 1913
- Turnout: 5.30% ▼5.48
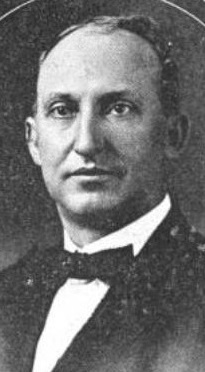

Nominee	George Washington Hays	Harry H. Myers
Party	Democratic	Republican
Popular vote	53,655	17,040
Percentage	64.25%	20.41%
Nominee	George W. Murphy	J. Emil Webber
Party	Progressive	Socialist
Popular vote	8,431	4,378
Percentage	10.10%	5.24%
- County results Hays: 40–50% 50–60% 60–70% 70–80% 80–90% >90% Myers: 40–50% 50–60%
Governor before election
Junius Marion Futrell
Democratic
Elected Governor
George Washington Hays
Democratic

The 1913 Arkansas gubernatorial special election took place on July 23, 1913. Acting governor Junius Marion Futrell chose to not seek a term in his own right, but in 1932 he would win a term as governor of Arkansas. Democratic George W. Hays defeated the Republican, Progressive and Socialist candidates Harry H. Myers, George W. Murphy and J. Emil Webber with 64.25% of the vote.

== Results ==
Arkansas gubernatorial special election, 1913
Party	Candidate	Votes	%
Democratic	George Washington Hays	53,655	64.25%
Republican	Harry H. Myers	17,040	20.41%
Progressive	George W. Murphy	8,431	10.10%
Socialist	J. Emil Webber	4,378	5.24%
Total votes		83,504	100%
