= Cherokee County Airport (Texas) =

Airport in Texas, United States

- IATA: JKV; ICAO: KJSO; FAA LID: JSO

Summary
- Airport type: Public
- Owner: Cherokee County
- Serves: Jacksonville, Texas
- Elevation AMSL: 677 ft (206 m)
- Coordinates: 31°52′10″N 095°13′03″W
- Website: CherokeeCountyAirport.com

Map
- Location within Texas

Runways
Direction	Length		Surface
Direction	ft	m	Surface
14/32	5,011	1,527	Asphalt

Statistics (2008)
- Aircraft operations: 12,350
- Based aircraft: 8
- Source: Federal Aviation Administration

Cherokee County Airport (IATA: JKV, ICAO: KJSO, FAA LID: JSO) is a county-owned public use airport in Cherokee County, Texas, United States. It is located six nautical miles (11 km) southeast of the central business district of Jacksonville, Texas.

Although most U.S. airports use the same three-letter location identifier for the FAA and IATA, this airport is assigned JSO by the FAA and JKV by the IATA (which assigned JSO to a heliport in Södertälje, Sweden).

== Facilities and aircraft ==
Cherokee County Airport covers an area of 224 acres (91 ha) at an elevation of 677 feet (206 m) above mean sea level. It has one asphalt paved runway designated 14/32 which measures 5,011 by 75 feet (1,527 x 23 m).

For the 12-month period ending September 16, 2008, the airport had 12,350 aircraft operations, an average of 33 per day: 99.6% general aviation and 0.4% military. At that time there were 8 aircraft based at this airport: 88% single-engine and 13% multi-engine.

== See also ==
- List of airports in Texas
