= John W. Grabiel =

American lawyer

John Willington Grabiel
- Born: March 17, 1867; Rushsylvania, Logan County; Ohio, USA
- Died: April 13, 1928 (aged 61); Fayetteville; Washington County, Arkansas
- Education: Ohio Northern University Findlay College Ohio State University
- Occupations: Lawyer; Republican gubernatorial nominee, 1922 and 1924
- Spouse(s): (1) Laura Hartman Grabiel (married 1892-1908, her death) (2) Edith Houck Grabiel (married 1912-1928, his death)
- Children: All from first marriage: Florence R. Ellis; Ruth R. Grabiel; John Kent Grabiel Richard H. Grabiel

John Willington Grabiel (March 17, 1867 – April 13, 1928) was an attorney in Fayetteville, Arkansas, who was the Republican gubernatorial nominee in 1922 and 1924.

== Early life ==
Grabiel was one of nine children born to John Grabiel (1815-1900), a farmer, and the Sarah Downs Tharp (1834-1913) in the village of Rushsylvania, or Rushcreek Township, in Logan County, Ohio. His paternal grandfather, Jacob Grabiel, migrated from Pennsylvania to Ohio in 1812. Earlier, Grabiel ancestors settled in 1635 in Virginia. The ancestor of the Virginia Grabiels had lived in Germany and was a Calvinist refugee from Switzerland. The Grabiels were active Presbyterians. The Tharps were a Virginia family too and were related to the Zanes, among the early pioneers of Ohio.

Educated in the common schools and Rushsylvania High School, Grabiel completed the liberal arts curriculum at the private Ohio Northern University in Ada in Hardin County, took a special course at the newly opened Findlay College in Findlay, Ohio, and completed a law course at Ohio State University in the capital city of Columbus. He was admitted to the Ohio bar in 1900 and practiced in Bowling Green, Ohio, until 1912, when he relocated to Fayetteville, Arkansas and started practicing law

== Marriage and family ==
In 1892, Grabiel married the former Laura M. Hartman (1870-1908) of Findlay, Ohio. The couple had four children, Florence R. Ellis (1895-1965), Ruth R. Grabiel (1897-1984), John Kent Grabiel (1900-1970), and Richard H. Grabiel (born 1904). In 1912, four years after Laura's death, Grabiel wed the former Edith Houck (1881-1940) of Rochester, New York.

== Civic and political affairs ==
Active in civic affairs while practicing law in Fayetteville, Grabiel was a member of the Benevolent and Protective Order of Elks and the Knights of Pythias . He was the first president of the Fayetteville Chamber of Commerce. In 1917, he spoke before civic groups on behalf of the U.S. entry into what became World War I.

In 1922 and 1924, Grabiel, a lifelong Republican, carried his party's gubernatorial banner. In the former year, he polled 28,055 votes (21.9 percent), losing to the Democratic incumbent, Thomas Chipman McRae, who received 99,987 votes (78.1 percent).

In the general election, held in October 1924, a month prior to the Coolidge/Davis presidential contest, Grabiel was again defeated, this time by the Democratic nominee, Tom J. Terral. The tabulation was 99,598 votes (79.8 percent) for Terral to 25,152 (20.2 percent) for Grabiel.

Grabiel died in Fayetteville in 1928 at the age of sixty-one. His party did not win the governorship again for another thirty-eight years, with the victory of Winthrop Rockefeller, a native New Yorker, over the Conservative Democrat James D. Johnson.

Party political offices
Preceded by Wallace Townsend	Republican nominee for Governor of Arkansas; 1922, 1924	Succeeded by Drew Bowers
