= Jacksonville, Texas =

- City
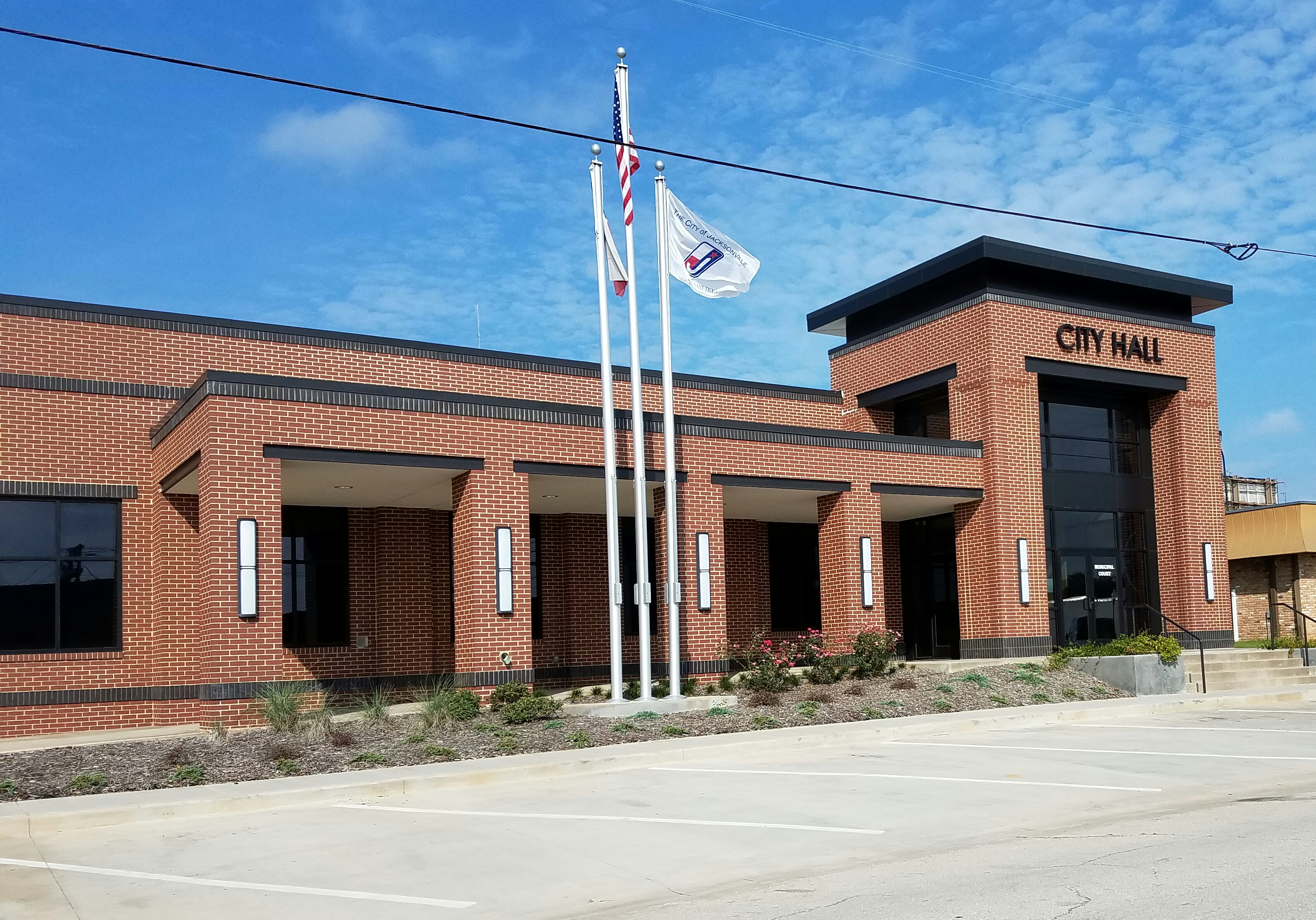
- Jacksonville's City Hall, located downtown on South Ragsdale Street, was completed in November 2016.

- Seal
- Nicknames: The Biggest Small Town in Texas; Tomato Capital of the World
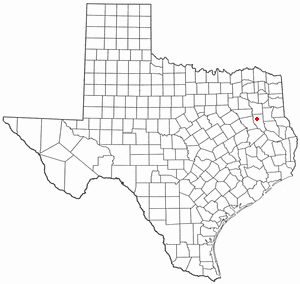
- Location of Jacksonville, Texas

- Coordinates: 31°57′34″N 95°16′00″W
- Country: United States
- State: Texas
- County: Cherokee

Government
  - Type: Council-Manager

Area
  - Total: 14.20 sq mi (36.77 km^{2})
  - Land: 14.19 sq mi (36.75 km^{2})
  - Water: 0.0077 sq mi (0.02 km^{2})
- Elevation: 505 ft (154 m)

Population (2020)
  - Total: 13,997
  - Density: 1,044.0/sq mi (403.09/km^{2})
- Time zone: UTC-6 (Central (CST))
  - Summer (DST): UTC-5 (CDT)
- ZIP code: 75766
- Area codes: 430, 903
- FIPS code: 48-37216
- GNIS feature ID: 2410130
- Website: http://www.jacksonvilletx.org

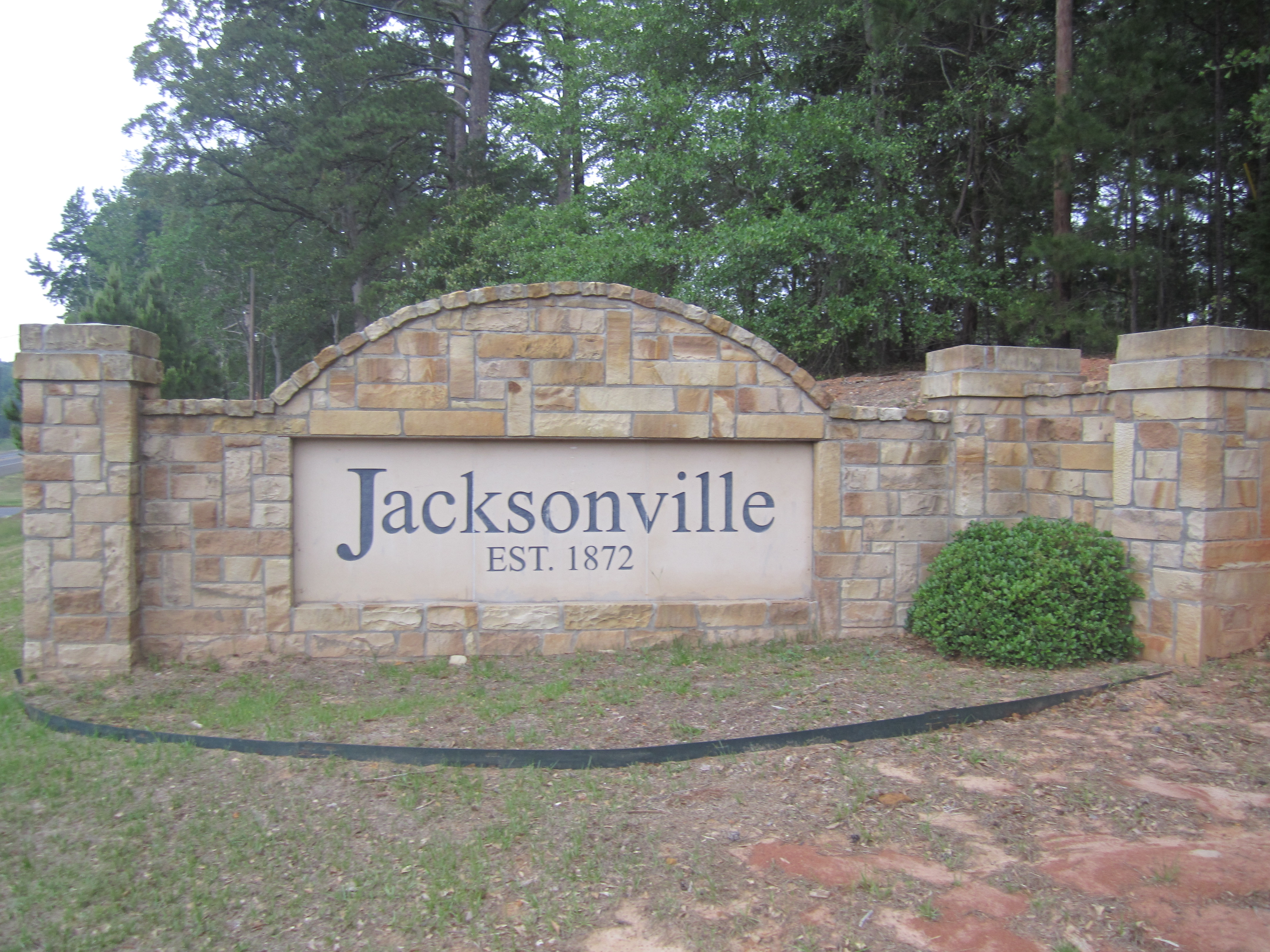
Monument-style welcome sign at U.S. Highway 69's north approach to the city.

Jacksonville is a city located in Cherokee County, Texas, United States. Its population was 13,997 at the 2020 U.S. census. It is the principal city of the Jacksonville micropolitan statistical area, which includes all of Cherokee County.

Jacksonville is located in East Texas, north of the county seat, Rusk, and south of Tyler, in Smith County.

Area production and shipping of tomatoes gained the town the title "Tomato Capital of the World". The impressive red iron ore rock Tomato Bowl, built by Works Progress Administration workers during the Great Depression, is home to the Jacksonville High School "Fightin' Indians" football and soccer teams. Annual events include the "Tops in Texas Rodeo" held in May and the "Tomato Fest" celebration in June.

== History ==
Jacksonville began in 1847 as the town of Gum Creek. Jackson Smith built a home and blacksmith shop in the area and became postmaster in 1848, when a post office was authorized. Shortly afterward, Dr. William Jackson established an office near Smith's shop. When the townsite was laid out in 1850, the name Jacksonville was chosen in honor of these two men. The name of the post office was changed from Gum Creek to Jacksonville in June 1850.

Despite never having organized unions in any Walmart stores before, meatcutters working at the Jacksonville Walmart voted in favor of organizing under the wing of the United Food and Commercial Workers union in February 2000. During a flurry of subsequent legal actions, Walmart discontinued store-level meatcutting and started shipping in packaged meat to their stores. When all the hearings and appeals were exhausted, courts decided that the local meatcutters did not embody the characteristics of a group that could bargain since they were not specialized. Even now, no one is in the Jacksonville meat department to make special cuts of meat, nor is any union presence there.

== Geography ==
According to the United States Census Bureau, the city has a total area of 14.1 square miles (37 km^{2}), of which 0.07% is covered by water.

=== Lake Jacksonville ===
Lake Jacksonville, 3 miles (5 km) southwest of Jacksonville, is the city's primary water source. It is a popular location for recreation and residences. It was created in 1957 and the city expected it to take years to fill with water from the surrounding creeks, but with an unusually rainy season, the lake reached full capacity in a year.

- Lake characteristics

Location: 3 miles southwest of Jacksonville off US 79
Surface area: 1,320 acres
Maximum depth: 62 feet
Impounded: 1957

=== Climate ===
With records only dating to 1953, Jacksonville was one of only a few Texas locations to have its all-time low occur during the 2021 Texas power crisis cold snap in February 2021.

Climate data for Jacksonville, Texas (1991–2020 normals, extremes 1953–present)
| Month | Jan | Feb | Mar | Apr | May | Jun | Jul | Aug | Sep | Oct | Nov | Dec | Year |
|---|---|---|---|---|---|---|---|---|---|---|---|---|---|
| Record high °F (°C) | 85 (29) | 91 (33) | 90 (32) | 95 (35) | 99 (37) | 103 (39) | 110 (43) | 108 (42) | 109 (43) | 100 (38) | 89 (32) | 83 (28) | 109 (43) |
| Mean daily maximum °F (°C) | 58.2 (14.6) | 62.5 (16.9) | 70.1 (21.2) | 77.2 (25.1) | 83.2 (28.4) | 89.9 (32.2) | 93.9 (34.4) | 94.3 (34.6) | 88.9 (31.6) | 79.2 (26.2) | 68.3 (20.2) | 60.7 (15.9) | 77.2 (25.1) |
| Daily mean °F (°C) | 46.0 (7.8) | 49.8 (9.9) | 56.7 (13.7) | 64.1 (17.8) | 72.2 (22.3) | 79.1 (26.2) | 82.8 (28.2) | 82.4 (28.0) | 76.6 (24.8) | 66.4 (19.1) | 55.8 (13.2) | 48.8 (9.3) | 65.1 (18.4) |
| Mean daily minimum °F (°C) | 33.8 (1.0) | 37.1 (2.8) | 43.3 (6.3) | 51.0 (10.6) | 61.2 (16.2) | 68.3 (20.2) | 71.6 (22.0) | 70.5 (21.4) | 64.2 (17.9) | 53.5 (11.9) | 43.2 (6.2) | 36.9 (2.7) | 52.9 (11.6) |
| Record low °F (°C) | 5 (−15) | −6 (−21) | 15 (−9) | 28 (−2) | 39 (4) | 50 (10) | 57 (14) | 54 (12) | 43 (6) | 29 (−2) | 14 (−10) | 5 (−15) | −6 (−21) |
| Average precipitation inches (mm) | 4.54 (115) | 4.24 (108) | 3.80 (97) | 3.38 (86) | 4.26 (108) | 4.04 (103) | 3.40 (86) | 3.07 (78) | 3.55 (90) | 4.75 (121) | 4.24 (108) | 4.23 (107) | 47.50 (1,207) |
| Average snowfall inches (cm) | 0.2 (0.51) | 0.0 (0.0) | 0.0 (0.0) | 0.0 (0.0) | 0.0 (0.0) | 0.0 (0.0) | 0.0 (0.0) | 0.0 (0.0) | 0.0 (0.0) | 0.0 (0.0) | 0.0 (0.0) | 0.0 (0.0) | 0.2 (0.51) |
| Average precipitation days (≥ 0.01 in) | 7.8 | 8.2 | 7.8 | 6.1 | 6.5 | 6.5 | 5.5 | 4.9 | 5.3 | 6.0 | 6.8 | 8.6 | 80.0 |
| Average snowy days (≥ 0.1 in) | 0.2 | 0.1 | 0.0 | 0.0 | 0.0 | 0.0 | 0.0 | 0.0 | 0.0 | 0.0 | 0.0 | 0.0 | 0.3 |
Source: NOAA

== Demographics ==
Historical population
| Census | Pop. | Note | %± |
|---|---|---|---|
| 1880 | 349 | | — |
| 1890 | 970 | | 177.9% |
| 1900 | 1,558 | | 60.6% |
| 1910 | 2,875 | | 84.5% |
| 1920 | 3,723 | | 29.5% |
| 1930 | 6,748 | | 81.3% |
| 1940 | 7,213 | | 6.9% |
| 1950 | 8,607 | | 19.3% |
| 1960 | 9,590 | | 11.4% |
| 1970 | 9,734 | | 1.5% |
| 1980 | 12,264 | | 26.0% |
| 1990 | 12,765 | | 4.1% |
| 2000 | 13,868 | | 8.6% |
| 2010 | 14,544 | | 4.9% |
| 2020 | 13,997 | | −3.8% |
U.S. Decennial Census

=== 2020 census ===
As of the 2020 census, 13,997 people, 4,967 households, and 3,670 families were residing in Jacksonville. The median age was 33.8 years. About 28.8% of residents were under 18 and 15.3% were 65 or older. For every 100 females, there were 90.2 males, and for every 100 females 18 and over there were 86.1 males 18 and over.

About 96.6% of residents lived in urban areas, while 3.4% lived in rural areas.

Of the 4,967 households in Jacksonville, 39.4% had children under 18 living in them, 40.8% were married-couple households, 17.0% were households with a male householder and no spouse or partner present, and 35.5% were households with a female householder and no spouse or partner present. About 28.4% of all households were made up of individuals, and 12.1% had someone living alone who was 65 or older.

The 5,585 housing units were 11.1% vacant. The homeowner vacancy rate was 1.7% and the rental vacancy rate was 8.2%.

Racial composition as of the 2020 census
| Race | Number | Percent |
|---|---|---|
| White | 5,800 | 41.4% |
| Black or African American | 2,777 | 19.8% |
| American Indian and Alaska Native | 228 | 1.6% |
| Asian | 105 | 0.8% |
| Native Hawaiian and other Pacific Islander | 5 | 0.0% |
| Some other race | 3,182 | 22.7% |
| Two or more races | 1,900 | 13.6% |
| Hispanic or Latino (of any race) | 5,749 | 41.1% |

== Government ==
=== Local government ===
According to the city's most recent Adopted Budget (September 2024), the city had a budget of $13.5 million in revenue and $15.0 million in expenditures, leading to a deficit of $1.5 million.

Management of the city and coordination of city services are provided by (as of 2024):

| Department | Director |
|---|---|
| City mayor | Randy Gorham |
| Mayor pro tem | Tim McRae |
| City manager | James Hubbard |
| Director of finance | Roxanna Briley |
| Fire chief | Paul Findley |
| Police chief | Steven Markasky |
| Director of public works | Randall Chandler |
| Director of water and sewer | Randall Chandler |
| Director of development services | Jody Watson |
| Director of streets | James Worley |
| Library director | Trina Stidham |

=== State government ===
Jacksonville is represented in the Texas Senate by Republican Robert Nichols, District 3, and in the Texas House of Representatives by Republican Joanne Shofner, District 11.

=== Federal government ===
At the federal level, the two U.S. senators from Texas are Republicans John Cornyn and Ted Cruz; Jacksonville is part of the Fifth Congressional District, represented by Republican Lance Gooden.

== Recreation ==
The Jacksonville Public Library served the City of Jacksonville and Cherokee County for over 70 years. The library was a member of the Texas Library Association, the Northeast Texas Library System, and the Forest Trails Library Consortium. In September 2020, the lot it sat on was sold to Chick-fil-A, where construction promptly began on a restaurant location. The new Jacksonville Public Library opened in April 2021, in the Norman Activities Center. Until the opening of the new location, Jacksonville residents were allowed to visit the Rusk Public Library with library card fines waived.

The Jacksonville Jax minor league baseball team played at Ragsdale Park between 1934 and 1950.

== Education ==
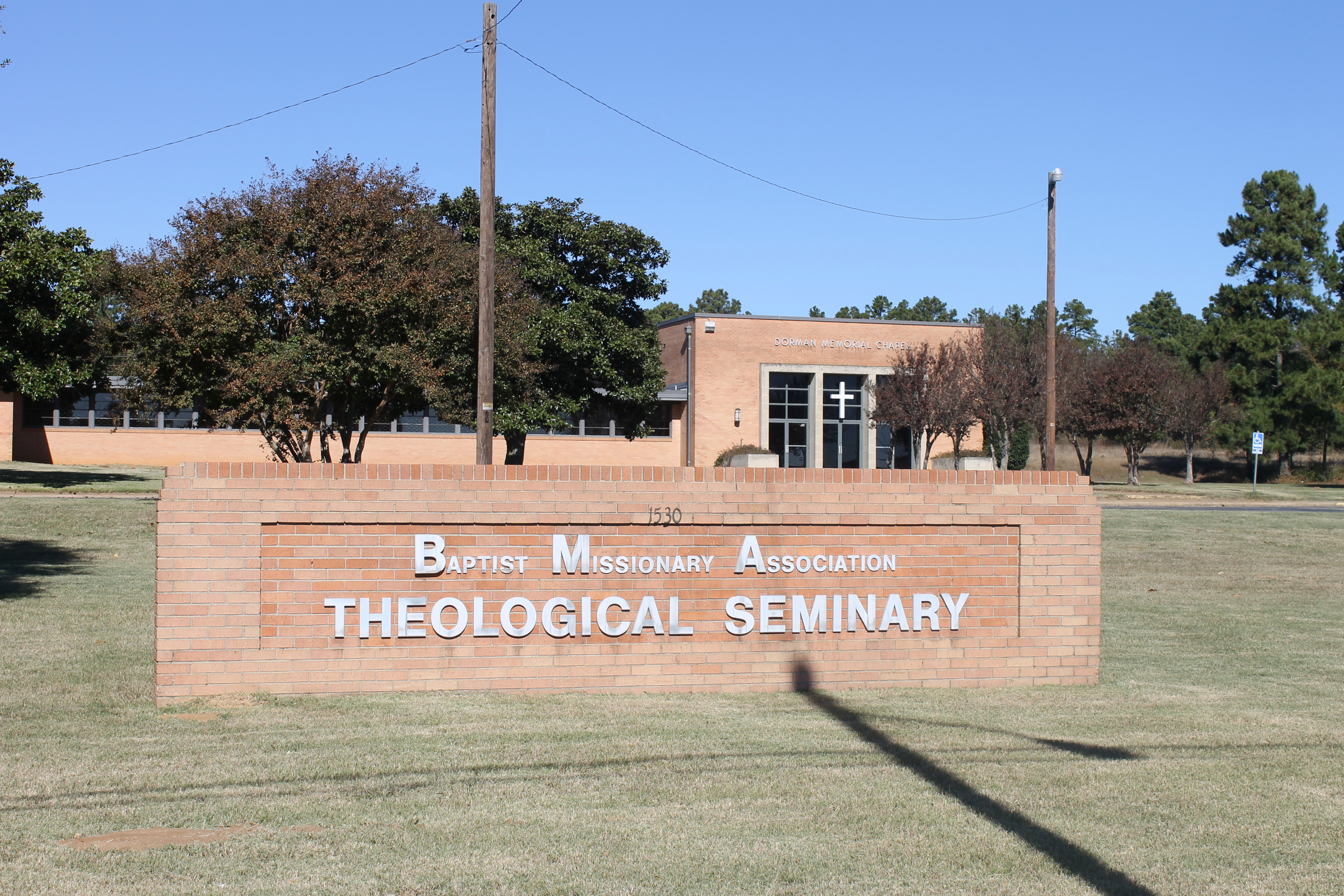
Baptist Missionary Association Theological Seminary, an entity of the Baptist Missionary Association of America, is located off State Highway 135 on the northeast side of the city.

The city of Jacksonville is served by the Jacksonville Independent School District. Jacksonville High School, the district's only high school, has "Fightin' Indians"/"Maidens" as mascots for its team sports.

=== Colleges, universities ===
Jacksonville College and the Baptist Missionary Association Theological Seminary, both of which are owned by the Baptist Missionary Association of America, are located in Jacksonville.

Lon Morris College, a United Methodist Church-operated private junior college, was located in Jacksonville until ceasing operations in 2012.

== Transportation ==
Many highways pass through or intersect in Jacksonville: US 69, US 79, US 175, SH 135, SH 204, FM 347, FM 768, FM 2138, and Loop 456. However, no Interstate highways pass through the city limits

Where three railroads once served the Jacksonville area (Southern Pacific and Cotton Belt abandoned their tracks in the mid-1980s), only one, Union Pacific, remains.

Cherokee County Airport is the sole airport within Jacksonville, but only serves general aviation. Commercial aviation can be accessed by traveling north to Tyler Pounds Regional Airport with an American Eagle flight to Dallas/Fort Worth International Airport or by driving about 132 miles via U.S. Route 175 to that airport or Dallas Love Field.

== Notable people ==
- Kevin Aldridge, former Tennessee Titans defensive lineman
- Ray Benge, baseball pitcher
- Bruce Channel, singer/songwriter
- Travis Clardy, Texas House of Representatives member for District 11
- John Clark, state championship-winning high school football coach and athletic director for Plano ISD in Plano
- Kerry Max Cook, exonerated former death-row inmate and author, former resident of Jacksonville
- Al Dexter, country music singer
- Sandy Duncan, actress, originally from Henderson, graduated from the former Lon Morris College
- Paul Gipson, running back
- Toby Gowin, former NFL punter
- Micah Hoffpauir, former Chicago Cubs first baseman
- Tommy Hollis, actor
- Mark Houston (1946–1995), composer, director, and actor
- Craig James, former professional football player, former ESPN and Fox Sports commentator
- John B. Kendrick, (1857–1933), senator and ninth governor of Wyoming, was born on a ranch near Jacksonville.
- Pete Lammons, former New York Jets tight end and defensive end
- Billy Martindale, former pro golfer, golf course designer
- Margo Martindale, award-winning actress, graduated from the former Lon Morris College
- Josh McCown, New York Jets quarterback
- Luke McCown, former NFL quarterback
- Neal McCoy, country music singer
- Robert Nichols, Texas state senator (2007–present), former Jacksonville mayor and city councilor
- Grady Nutt, (1934–1982), Christian minister and humorist who resided in Jacksonville for several years
- V. O. Stamps (1892–1940) was co-founder of the Stamps-Baxter Music Company.
- Alan Tudyk, actor, originally from El Paso, graduated from the former Lon Morris College
- Travis Ward, (1922–2015), independent Texas oil man
- Lee Ann Womack, country music singer
- Deborah Yates, Tony-nominated broadway actress and former member of the Rockettes
