= 1914 Arkansas gubernatorial election =

- September 14, 1914
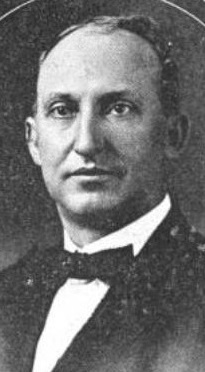

Nominee	George Washington Hays	Andrew L. Kinney	Dan Hogan
Party	Democratic	Republican	Socialist
Popular vote	94,143	30,947	10,434
Percentage	69.47%	22.83%	7.70%
- County results Hays: 40–50% 50–60% 60–70% 70–80% 80–90% >90% Kinney: 50–60%
Governor before election
George Washington Hays
Democratic
Elected Governor
George Washington Hays
Democratic

The 1914 Arkansas gubernatorial election was held on September 14, 1914.

Incumbent Democratic Governor George Washington Hays won re-election to a second term, defeating Republican nominee Andrew L. Kinney and Socialist nominee Dan Hogan with 69.47% of the vote.

== Democratic primary ==
The Democratic primary election was held on March 25, 1914. Hays was unopposed for the nomination.

== General election ==
=== Candidates ===
- George Washington Hays, Democratic
- Andrew L. Kinney, Republican
- Dan Hogan, Socialist, candidate for Governor in 1906 and 1910

=== Results ===
1914 Arkansas gubernatorial election
Party	Candidate	Votes	%	±%
Democratic	George Washington Hays (incumbent)	94,143	69.47%	
Republican	Andrew L. Kinney	30,947	22.83%	
Socialist	Dan Hogan	10,434	7.70%	
Majority		63,196	46.64%	
Turnout		135,524	100.00%	
Democratic hold		Swing		

== Bibliography ==
- Gubernatorial Elections, 1787-1997. Washington, D.C.: Congressional Quarterly Inc. 1998. ISBN 1-56802-396-0.
- Glashan, Roy R. (1979). American Governors and Gubernatorial Elections, 1775-1978. Meckler Books. ISBN 0-930466-17-9.
