= Clay Fulks =

American writer (1880–1964)

Clay Fulks (1880–1964) was a writer on Arkansas lore.

In his articles Fulks was one of those who shared H. L. Mencken's dichotomy between a backward and an enlightened South. This dichotomy Fulks blamed on an infestation of parsons.

In 1918, Fulks was the unsuccessful Socialist Party of America candidate for governor of Arkansas against Charles Hillman Brough.

Fulks wrote Rev. Ben M. Bogard Fails to Halt Devil Darrow, an attack of ridicule on the conservative theologian Ben M. Bogard, of Little Rock, Arkansas, who challenged the secularism of the Chicago attorney Clarence Darrow.

Fulks also wrote The War Between Science and Faith.
