= Wallace Townsend =

American lawyer (1882–1979)

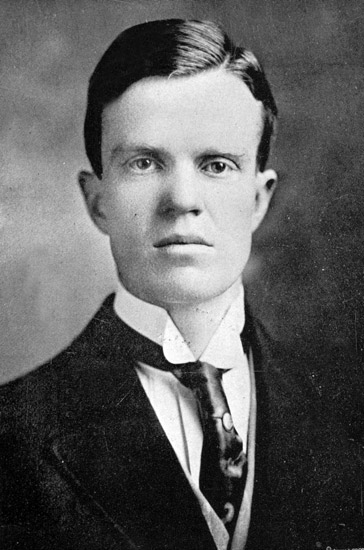
- Townsend in 1910

Republican National Committeeman for Arkansas
- In office 1928–1961
- Preceded by: Harmon L. Remmel
- Succeeded by: Winthrop Rockefeller

Personal details
- Born: August 20, 1882 DeWitt, Iowa, U.S.
- Died: January 7, 1979 (aged 96) Little Rock, Arkansas, U.S.
- Party: Republican
- Spouse(s): (1) Bess Voss Townsend (married 1914-1958, her death) (2) Floy Smith Plunkett Townsend (married 1962)
- Children: 2
- Education: Hendrix College; William H. Bowen School of Law
- Occupation: Schoolteacher, lawyer

Wallace Townsend (August 20, 1882 – January 7, 1979) was an American lawyer who was from 1928 to 1961 the Republican national committeeman for the U.S. state of Arkansas. When he left his party's national committee, he was succeeded by Winthrop Rockefeller, who was elected five years thereafter in 1966 as the state's first Republican governor since the Reconstruction era.

== Early life and education ==
Townsend was born in DeWitt in Clinton County in easternmost Iowa, a son of John R. Townsend and the former Italia James. In 1894, Townsend moved with his family to the capital city of Little Rock, where his brother, A. E. "Jack" Townsend, was the long-term assistant postmaster. In 1902, Wallace Townsend obtained a Bachelor of Arts degree from Hendrix College in Conway, Arkansas, and became an educator for eight years. From 1906 to 1910, he was principal of Little Rock High School, in which capacity he obtained the first accreditation of the institution.

== Legal and political career ==
In 1906, Townsend received his LLB degree from the William H. Bowen School of Law of the University of Arkansas at Little Rock. In 1910, he began a legal practice chiefly concerned with revenue bonds and that same year vacated the principalship in Little Rock and ran unsuccessfully as the Republican nominee for Arkansas superintendent of public instruction. He became an integral part of the GOP legal counsel active in the Lily White faction, which sought to recruit white Conservative Democrats into the Republican Party, then previously the domain of the relatively few African-American voters registered in the state. In 1914, Townsend joined Augustus Caleb Remmel, the chairman of the Pulaski County Republican organization, to take control of the state party for the Lily Whites. A. C. Remmel (1882-1920), known as "Gus" Remmel, was the father of later Republican figure Pratt C. Remmel, who was the mayor of Little Rock from 1951 to 1955, and ran unsuccessfully in 1954 against Orval Faubus for the governorship.

Townsend was the unsuccessful Republican gubernatorial nominee in both 1916 and 1920, having been defeated by the Democrats, Charles Hillman Brough and Thomas Chipman McRae, respectively. In the 1916 race, Townsend polled 43,963 votes (25 percent), compared to Brough's 122,041 (69.5 percent). Another 9,730 votes were cast for the Socialist William Davis.

In the 1920 race, McRae polled 123, 637 votes (66.6 percent) to Townsend's 46,350 (25 percent). An Independent, Josiah H. Blount, the principal of an African-American school in Helena, Arkansas, defected from the Republicans and received the remaining 15,627 (8.4 percent). Blount was formerly affiliated with the former Black-and-Tan faction of the GOP. The gains predicted by Townsend and the Lily Whites never materialized, and the Black and Tans, as they became known in other southern states as well, were reconciled for several more decades with the regular GOP. In time though Arkansas black voters swung solidly Democratic by the 1970s.

Townsend attended each Republican National Convention from 1912 to 1960. From 1916 to 1962, he served on the state party’s executive committee. He was the state party’s vice chairman from 1920 to 1928 and the national committeeman for thirty-three years, 1928 to 1961. During the Warren G. Harding administration, Townsend was named registrar of the U.S. land office at Little Rock from 1922 to 1924. The Hoover administration named him United States Attorney for the Eastern District of Arkansas, a patronage appointment that he held from 1930 to 1934, when he was replaced in the Franklin D. Roosevelt administration. Townsend's career at times paralleled that of another veteran Little Rock attorney, Osro Cobb, a member of the Arkansas House of Representatives from 1927 to 1931 for Montgomery County. Cobb served as the U.S. Attorney for the Eastern District of Arkansas in the Dwight D. Eisenhower administration.

As the trustee of the Little Rock Stave Company, which declared bankruptcy in April 1912, Townsend filed suit over payment of 10 percent dividends to stockholders. The payments were made after the firm had already become insolvent. Townsend was active in many organizations, such as the Little Rock Boys Club and the Chamber of Commerce.

== Personal life ==
Townsend and his wife, Bess Voss, whom he married in 1914, had two daughters. She died in 1958, and four years later, Townsend wed Floy Smith Plunkett. Townsend continued to practice law until 1974, when he retired at the age of ninety-two. He died some five years later in Little Rock.

The Special Collections section of the Ottenheimer Library at the University of Arkansas at Little Rock houses the Townsend papers.

== See also ==
- List of United States attorneys for the Eastern District of Arkansas

Party political offices
Preceded by Audrey L. Kinney	Republican nominee for Governor of Arkansas; 1916	Vacant Title next held by Himself
Vacant Title last held by Himself	Republican nominee for Governor of Arkansas; 1920	Succeeded by John W. Grabiel
