= George Washington Hays =

American politician

George Hays
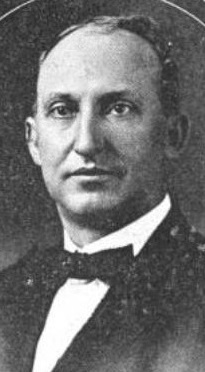
- Dearborn Independent, September 25, 1926

24th Governor of Arkansas
- In office August 6, 1913 – January 10, 1917
- Preceded by: Junius Marion Futrell (acting)
- Succeeded by: Charles Hillman Brough

Personal details
- Born: George Washington Hays; September 23, 1863 Camden, Arkansas, U.S.
- Died: September 15, 1927 (aged 63) Little Rock, Arkansas, U.S.
- Party: Democratic
- Children: 2
- Education: Washington and Lee University

George Washington Hays (September 23, 1863 – September 15, 1927) was an American politician who served as the 24th governor of Arkansas from 1913 to 1917.

== Biography ==
Hays was born in Camden, Arkansas. He attended public schools in Camden and worked as a farmer, store clerk and teacher. Hays studied law at Washington and Lee University Law in Lexington, Virginia, and opened his own law practice in Camden. He was married to Ida Virginia Yarborough and had 2 children.

== Career ==
Hays was probate and county judge for Ouachita County, Arkansas between 1900 and 1905. Hays served as a judge with the Thirteenth Circuit Court from 1906 to 1913.

When Governor Joseph Taylor Robinson resigned in 1913 to serve in the United States Senate, a special election was held and Hays was elected governor. His administration focused on road improvement and enactment of a statewide prohibition law. The Hays administration also enacted various labor laws and completed construction of the new state capitol building. Hays won reelection in a contested election in 1914.

Hays returned to private law practice in Little Rock after his term as governor, and published several articles in national periodicals, including Scribner's.

According to one study, Hays showed “much less interest in the goals of the progressives” than his successor Charles Hillman Brough, with reforms carried out by the legislature during his term “usually accomplished without leadership from the governor’s office,” as one study has argued.

== Death ==
Hays died in Little Rock, Arkansas of influenza and pneumonia and is buried in Camden, Arkansas in Greenwood Cemetery.

== See also ==
- List of governors of Arkansas

Party political offices
Preceded by Joseph Taylor Robinson	Democratic nominee for Governor of Arkansas; 1913, 1914	Succeeded by Charles Hillman Brough
Political offices
Preceded by Junius Marion Futrell; Acting Governor	Governor of Arkansas; 1913–1917	Succeeded by Charles Hillman Brough
