= Baptist Missionary Association Theological Seminary =

- Motto: "Earnestly Contending for the Faith"
- Type: Private, Baptist
- Established: 1955
- Affiliations: Baptist Missionary Association of America
- President: Dr. Philip Attebery
- Dean: Dr. David Hellwig
- Faculty: 10
- Students: 160
- Location: Jacksonville, Texas, United States
- Website: www.bmats.edu

The Baptist Missionary Association Theological Seminary (BMATS or BMA Theological Seminary) is an institution in Jacksonville, Texas, owned and operated by the Baptist Missionary Association of America. It is located off Texas State Highway 135 on the northeast side of Jacksonville.

The BMA Theological Seminary Divisions of Graduate and Undergraduate Studies are accredited by the Commission on Colleges of the Southern Association of Colleges and Schools) to award the Associate of Divinity, Bachelor of Arts in Religion, Master of Arts (Religion), Master of Arts in Church Ministries, and Master of Divinity degrees. The SACS institutional accreditation is used by BMA Seminary to determine institutional eligibility for Federal Student Aid. BMA Seminary (Graduate Studies Division) is accredited by the Association of Theological Schools in the United States and Canada to award the Master of Divinity and the Master of Arts in Church Ministries degrees. BMA Seminary is a member of the Council of Southwestern Theological Schools, the Forest Trail Library Consortium, and the American Theological Library Association.

== Gallery ==
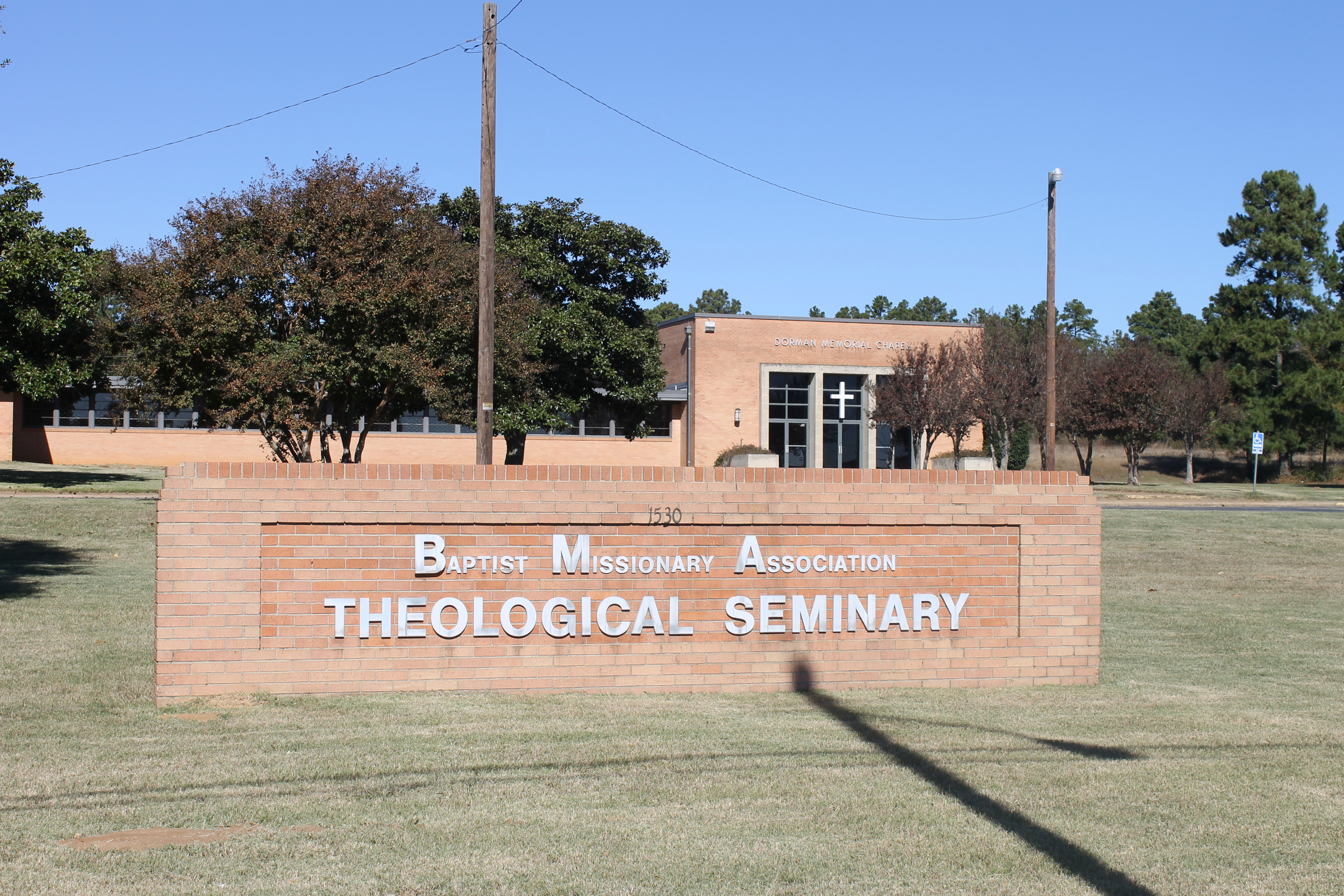
Baptist Missionary Association Theological Seminary monument sign

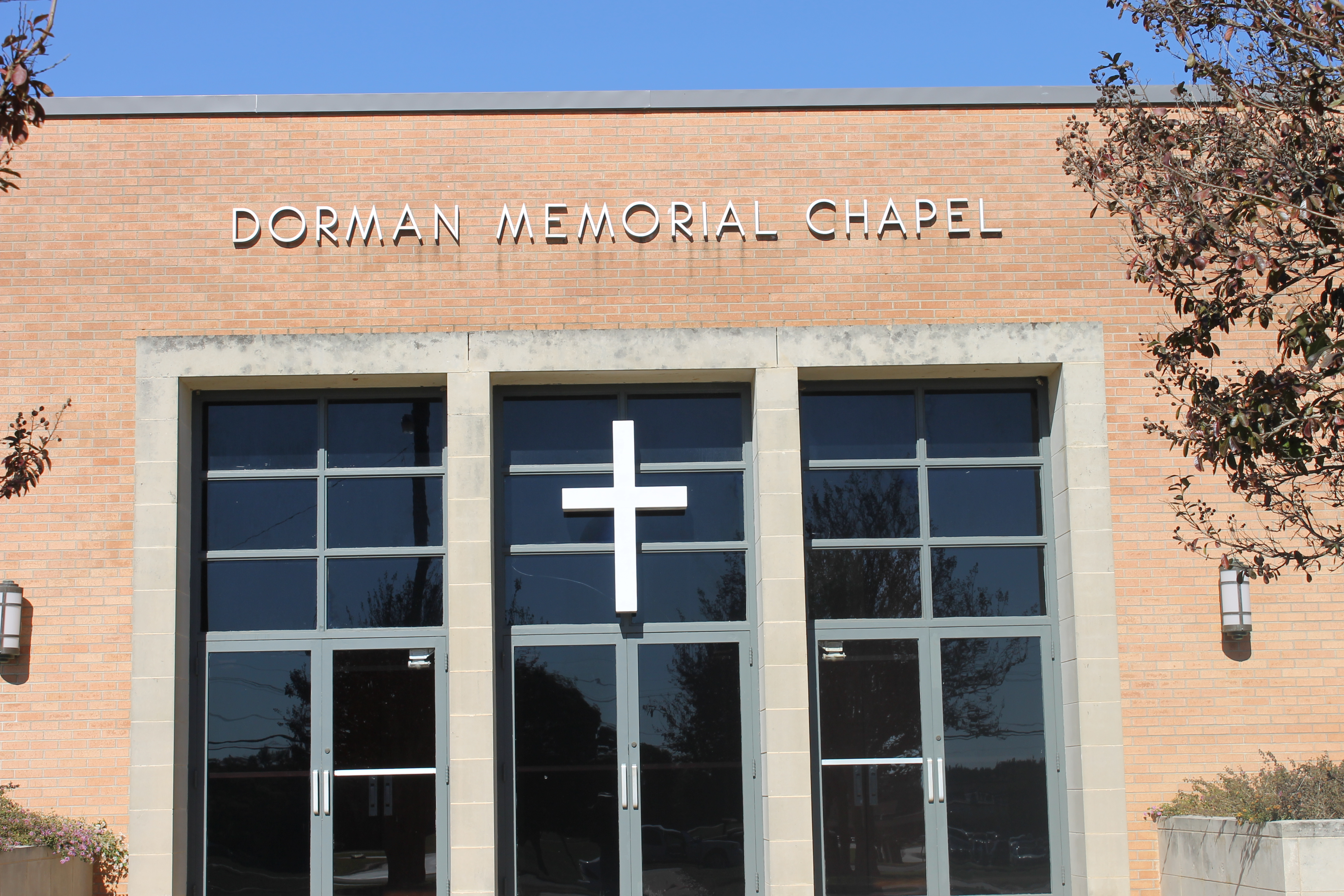
Dorman Memorial Chapel is named for a seminary founding trustee, W. J. Dorman
