= Thomas C. McRae =

American judge (1851–1929)

Thomas Chipman McRae
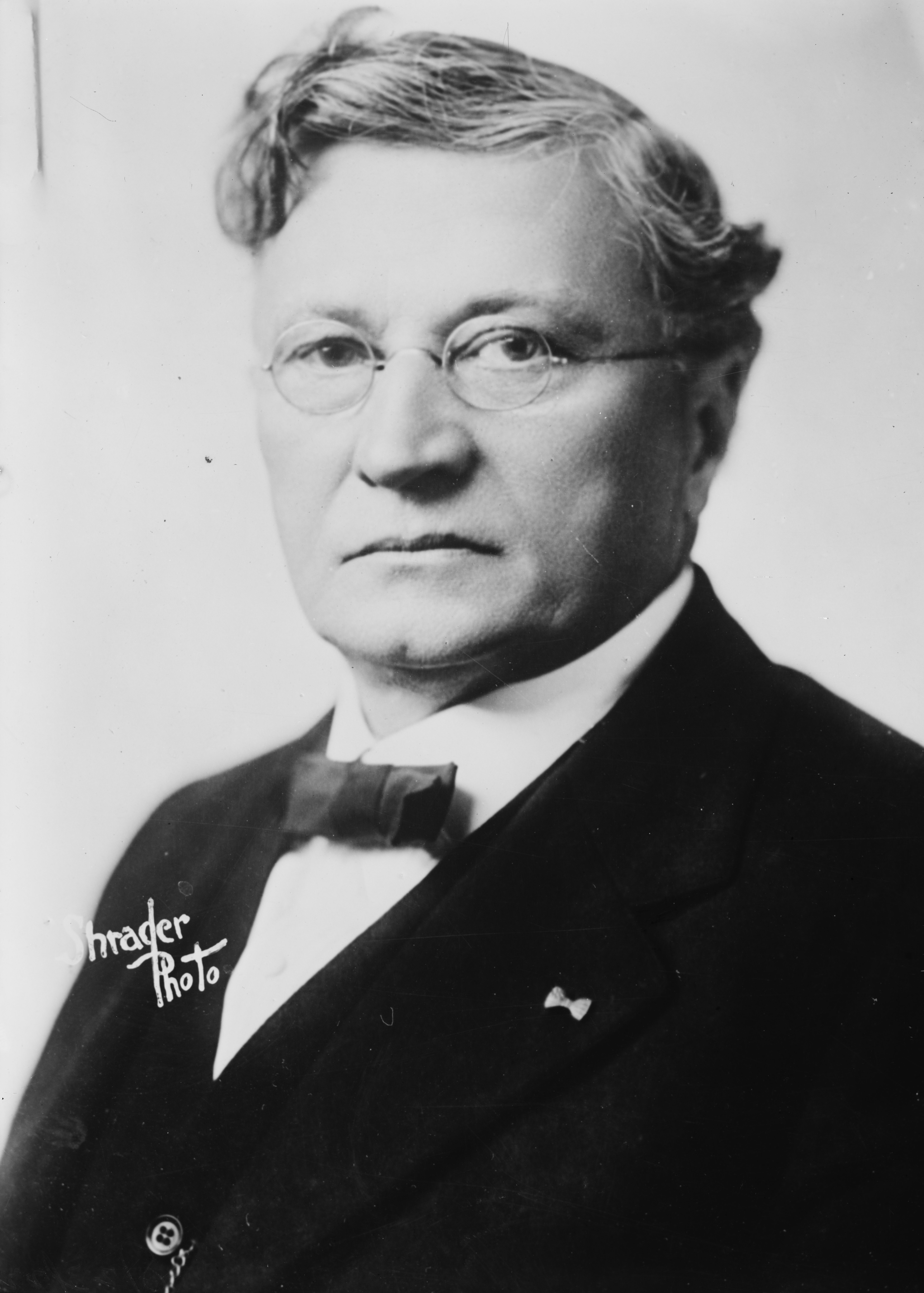

26th Governor of Arkansas
- In office January 11, 1921 – January 13, 1925
- Preceded by: Charles Hillman Brough
- Succeeded by: Tom Jefferson Terral

Member of the U.S. House of Representatives from Arkansas's 3rd district
- In office December 7, 1885 – March 3, 1903
- Preceded by: John H. Rogers
- Succeeded by: Hugh A. Dinsmore

Member of the Arkansas House of Representatives
- In office 1877-1879

Personal details
- Born: December 21, 1851 Mount Holly, Arkansas, US
- Died: June 2, 1929 (aged 77) Prescott, Arkansas, US
- Party: Democratic

Thomas Chipman McRae (December 21, 1851 – June 2, 1929) was an American attorney and politician from Arkansas. Described as a “Woodrow Wilson progressive," he served as a Democratic member of the United States House of Representatives (1885 to 1903) and the 26th governor of Arkansas, from 1921 to 1925.

== Biography ==
Thomas Chipman McRae, the eldest of five siblings, was born to Duncan L. and Mary Ann (Chipman) McRae on December 21, 1851, at Mount Holly in Union County, Arkansas. He attended Soule Business College in New Orleans, Louisiana and graduated with a law degree from the Washington and Lee University School of Law in Lexington, Virginia. He passed the Arkansas bar in 1873, and began his practice at Rosston in Nevada County, Arkansas. He married Amelia Ann White in December 1874, with whom he would go on to have six daughters and three sons. On May 19, 1877, Nevada County voters elected to move the county seat from Rosston, and construct a new courthouse in the newly created railroad town of Prescott. McRae relocated his family there to be closer to his center of business.

In 1874, McRae was appointed to the post of Election Commissioner in Arkansas. From 1877 to 1879, he served in the Arkansas House of Representatives and was a presidential elector in 1880. In 1884, 1896, and 1900, he was a delegate to the Democratic National Convention and served as president of the convention twice. From 1888 to 1902 he was a member of the Democratic Congressional Campaign Committee. From 1885 to 1903, McRae served in the United States House of Representatives.

During his time in Congress, McRae advocated (as noted by one study) “a quasi-populist legislative program that reflected both the needs and aspirations of his rural and poverty-ridden district.”

In 1902, McRae donated land for an African American school in Prescott, Arkansas. McRae's Elementary, Middle, and High School were integrated with the Prescott School District in 1969.

In 1917 and 1918, McRae was president of the Arkansas Bar Association; in the latter year he took part in the Arkansas Constitutional Convention.

In 1920, McRae was elected to his first term as Governor of Arkansas. In the election, McRae represented the Democratic Party, receiving 123,637 votes (66.6 percent). Wallace Townsend represented the Republican Party, receiving 46,350 votes (25 percent), and Josiah H. Blount represented the Independent Party, receiving 15,627 votes (8.4 percent). Blount, an African American school superintendent from Forest City, was the leader of a splinter GOP faction called the "Black-and-Tan Republicans," who protested the "lily-white" stand of its new leaders that included gubernatorial nominee Townsend. Blount was the first of his race to seek election as Arkansas's chief executive.

McRae was elected to his second term in 1922. In that election, McRae received 99,987 votes (78.1 percent), and Republican John W. Grabiel received 28,055 votes (21.9 percent).

During his tenure, the first state funds for child-hygiene work in Arkansas were made available by the legislature, while a child-labor amendment was adopted. The Arkansas Railroad Commission was also re-established, the Arkansas Corporation Commission was abolished, and the Arkansas Tuberculosis Sanitarium for Negroes was established. A severance tax was passed with its revenue funding public schools, the Arkansas Office of State Geologist was created, and a personal income tax law was enacted.

Upon the end of his governorship, McRae was appointed special Chief Justice of the Arkansas Supreme Court. He was elected a life member of the Arkansas Democratic State Convention in 1926. After serving four years as Governor of Arkansas, McRae returned to Prescott to be with his family. He resumed his law practice and he engaged in banking activities until his death on June 2, 1929. McRae is buried in the historic section of the De Ann Cemetery in Prescott.

McRae was a cousin of Thomas Banks Cabaniss, a U.S. Representative from Georgia. He was also the grandfather of Thomas C. "Tom" McRae, III, longtime President of the Winthrop Rockefeller Foundation who challenged Bill Clinton for the Democratic Gubernatorial Nomination in 1990.

Party political offices
Preceded by Charles Hillman Brough	Democratic nominee for Governor of Arkansas; 1920, 1922	Succeeded by Tom Terral
U.S. House of Representatives
Preceded by John H. Rogers	Member of the U.S. House of Representatives from Arkansas's 3rd congressional district 1885 – 1903	Succeeded by Hugh A. Dinsmore
Political offices
Preceded by Charles Hillman Brough	Governor of Arkansas; 1921 – 1925	Succeeded by Tom Jefferson Terral
