= Charles Hillman Brough =

25th Governor of Arkansas

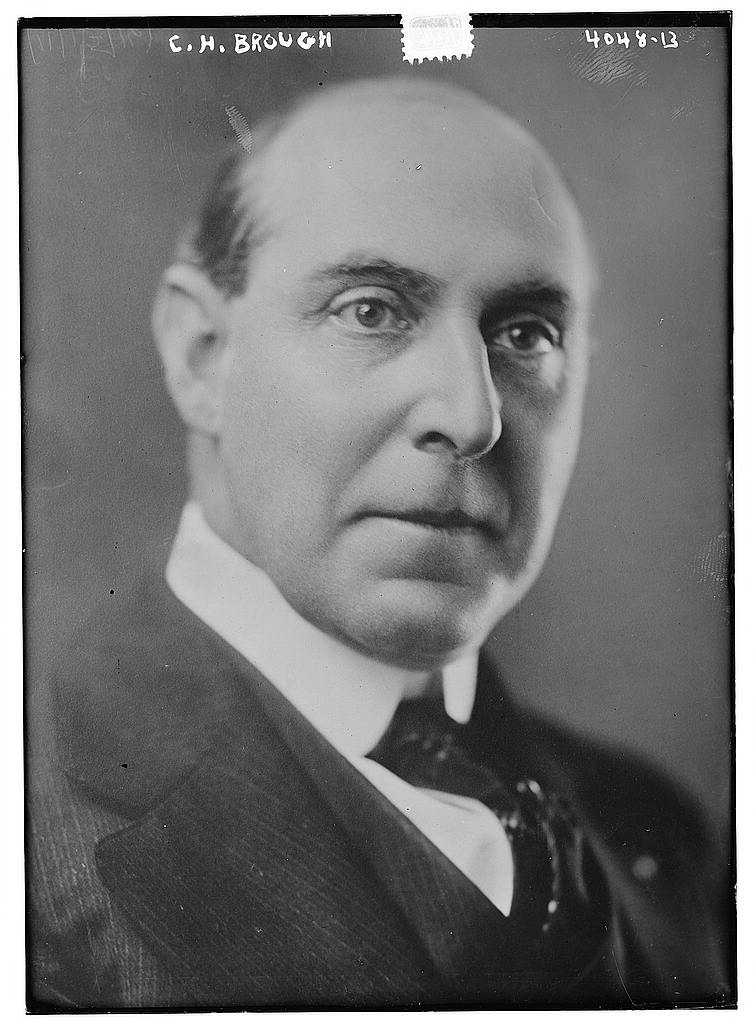
- Hillman Brough in 1916

25th Governor of Arkansas
- In office January 10, 1917 – January 11, 1921
- Preceded by: George Washington Hays
- Succeeded by: Thomas Chipman McRae

Personal details
- Born: July 9, 1876 Clinton, Mississippi, U.S.
- Died: December 26, 1935 (aged 59) Washington, D.C., U.S.
- Resting place: Roselawn Memorial Park in Little Rock, Arkansas
- Party: Democratic
- Education: Mississippi College Johns Hopkins University University of Mississippi School of Law
- Profession: Professor, Lawyer

Charles Hillman Brough (July 9, 1876 – December 26, 1935) was an American politician who served as the 25th governor of Arkansas from 1917 to 1921. He signed a bill for women’s suffrage in Arkansas and supported it nationally.

== Biography ==
Charles Brough was born in Clinton in Hinds County in central Mississippi. In 1894, he graduated from Mississippi College in Clinton. He earned his Ph.D. in 1898 from Johns Hopkins University in Baltimore, Maryland. He graduated from the University of Mississippi Law School in 1902. He taught at Mississippi College and the former women's institution, Hillman College, also in Clinton, Mississippi, and then the University of Arkansas at Fayetteville. He was a deacon in the Baptist Church.

Brough was elected governor in 1916. He defeated attorney Wallace Townsend, an Iowa native who later served as the long-term Republican national committeeman from Arkansas. Townsend made another unsuccessful gubernatorial bid in 1920 against Brough's successor, Thomas Chipman McRae.

During the Brough administration, numerous reforms were introduced such as the founding of the state reformatory for women and a girl's industrial school was opened. He signed into law a bill which allowed women to vote in primary elections. Under Brough, Arkansas became the only southern state to allow women's suffrage prior to the Nineteenth Amendment. Brough, a liberal Democrat, publicly supported anti-lynching laws. He was reelected as governor in 1918, when the Republican Party endorsed Brough against the Socialist Clay Fulks.

In 1919, the Elaine massacre in Elaine, Phillips County, took place in which white residents created false conspiracies about black residents wanting to kill whites although black residents were only trying to form a union to demand better wages as sharecroppers. Brough requested federal troops from the War Department and accompanied the troops to the scene. There, soldiers rounded up black residents and, as the Mississippi vigilantes and local posse were already doing, killed black residents indiscriminately. At least two and possibly more victims were killed by soldiers. Up to 237 black people were killed in the massacre. It was one of the deadliest racial conflicts in all of American history.

Brough was a personal friend of the Woodward family and was an early influence on prominent southern historian C. Vann Woodward.

Brough served as the director of the Public Information Bureau from 1925 to 1928 and in 1929 as president of Central Baptist College in Conway, Arkansas. He chaired the Virginia-District of Columbia Boundary Commission from 1934 to 1935. Brough was also a Civitan. Brough also unsuccessfully ran for the U.S. Senate in 1932 but lost in the Democratic primary to Senator Hattie Caraway.

Brough died in Washington, D.C. Like many other Arkansas governors, he is interred at the Roselawn Memorial Park Cemetery in the capital city of Little Rock.

Asked how to pronounce his surname, he told The Literary Digest: "Pronounced as if it were spelled bruff." (Charles Earle Funk, What's the Name, Please?, Funk & Wagnalls, 1936.)

== See also ==
- Moore v. Dempsey

Party political offices
Preceded by George Washington Hays	Democratic nominee for Governor of Arkansas; 1916, 1918	Succeeded by Thomas Chipman McRae
Political offices
Preceded by George Washington Hays	Governor of Arkansas; 1917–1921	Succeeded by Thomas Chipman McRae
