= Baptist Missionary Association of America =

Association of Missionary Baptist churches

- Abbreviation: BMAA
- Established: 1950 (76 years ago)
- Type: 501(c)(3), religious organization
- Headquarters: Conway, Arkansas
- Region served: Worldwide
- Official language: English
- Website: bmaamerica.org

The Baptist Missionary Association of America (BMAA), founded in 1950, is a voluntary association of Missionary Baptist churches with its offices located in Conway, Arkansas, United States.

It owns the Baptist Missionary Association Theological Seminary located in Conway and Jacksonville, Texas. It also operates Lifeword Media Ministries and DiscipleGuide Church Resources in Conway.

== History ==
The BMAA was formed as the North American Baptist Association in Little Rock, Arkansas, in 1950, when it broke with the American Baptist Association over church representation matters. The Baptist Missionary Association of America adopted its current name in 1969. The majority of BMAA churches are concentrated in the Southern United States, but the association has churches across the United States and supports missions throughout the world. Most churches participate in local and state associations as well as the national/general body. However, each state and local association is autonomous. As of 2026, there were 978 congregations in the United States.

The 2022 BMAA national meeting passed resolutions defining the organization as pro-Christian Zionist, anti-Gay Rights, anti-euthanasia, and called for the election of more born-again Christians to public office.
