= Gerardus D. Bouw =

Gerardus Dingeman Bouw (March 15, 1945 – November 4, 2023) was a Dutch American who was a prominent 20th century advocate of the pseudoscientific geocentric creationist view which advocates for the acceptance of the Tychonic system, the leader of the creationist organization Association for Biblical Astronomy and the author of multiple books in the defence of that view. Gerardus Bouw was also known for being an advocate of the King James only movement, viewing it as the providentially preserved word of God.

Gerardus Bouw was a Baptist, and he defended the Baptist successionism, the claim that Baptists come from an unbroken line of Christians from the days of the apostles.

== Life ==
Gerardus Bouw was born in the Netherlands at the end of World War II, after which his family moved to Canada and then to the United States. Gerardus Bouw had acquired a Ph.D in astronomy from Case-Western Reserve University in Cleveland, and he for a time was an instructor for astronomy at Baldwin Wallace University. Bouw claims to have initially been an Atheist, then a theistic evolutionist, until becoming a young Earth creationist and joining the Creation Research Society. However, he ran into disagreements with the society, and reading the works of Walter van der Kamp, he became convinced of geocentrism and became his successor for the Tychonic Society, which he later renamed.

Bouw was among the many defendants in the second list of witnesses in the Edwards v. Aguillard case, where the Supreme Court of the United States established teaching creationism in public schools to be unconstitutional. However, in this case he argued that public schools in America should be required to teach creationism alongside evolution.

== Theological views ==
=== Geocentricity ===
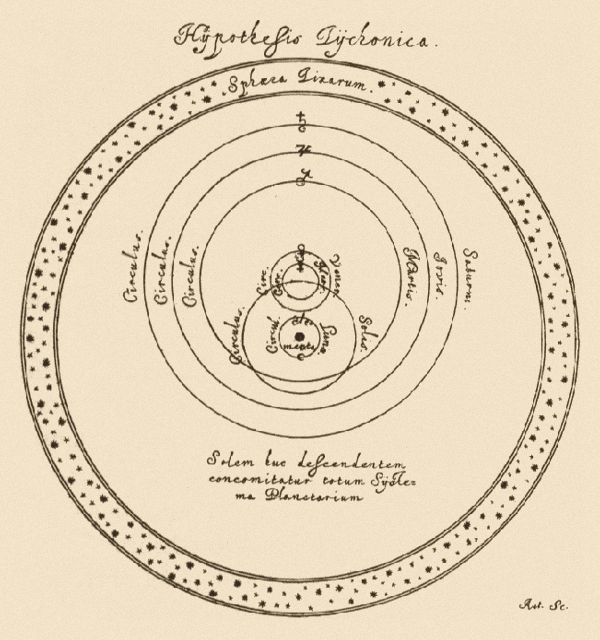
A 17th century illustration of the Hypothesis Tychonica from Hevelius' Selenographia, 1647 page 163, whereby the Sun, Moon, and sphere of stars orbit the Earth, while the five known planets (Mercury, Venus, Mars, Jupiter, and Saturn) orbit the Sun.

Bouw was known for his geocentric views, which the majority of Christians today reject, even those who are opposed to evolution. These views have been criticized by both creationist groups such as Answers in Genesis, and old Earth creationists such as Gavin Ortlund.

Bouw held to a very literal hermeneutic, often taking it much further than most creationists such as John C. Whitcomb. Bouw believed that the theory of heliocentrism is what eventually led into many of the "immoralities" seen today. Due to this, he ended up modifying the cosmology of the 16th century Danish astronomer Tycho Brahe, who offered a modified model of geocentrism that put the planets centered on the motion of the Sun rather than the Earth, while the Sun orbited a stationary Earth. Bouw modified this model further by adjusting the stars also to be centered on the Sun rather than the Earth to explain the aberration of starlight. This way, he believed that his modified geocentric model would be observationally equivalent to heliocentrism, thus leading to the argument that the correct view can be established only outside scientific observation with theological reasoning.

=== King James Onlyism ===
Gerardus Bouw believed in King James Onlyism, he became convinced of the King James Only view due to being convinced by James Nolen Hanson, a creationist professor of computer science at Cleveland State University. He was persuaded by arguments that a denial of such providential preservation would lead to agnosticism and doubt.

=== Baptist Successionism ===
Gerardus Bouw believed that throughout history, there have been multiple grounds of Christians such as the Montanists, Novatians, Jovinianists, Helvidius, Vigilantius, Messalians, Paulicians, Albigenses, Waldensians and the Anabaptists whom he believed to have taught Baptistic doctrine, compromising the true line of Christians.
