= Jovinianism =

Anti-ascetic movement

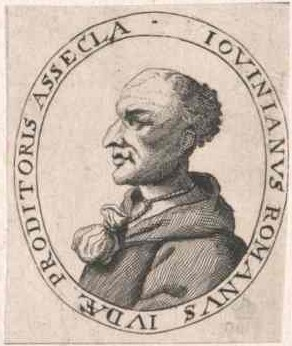
Jovinian

Jovinianism refers to an anti-ascetic movement that has its origins in the 4th-century theologian Jovinian, who criticized the monastic movement and argued for the equality of marriage and celibacy. Jovinianism was criticized by Saint Augustine and Jerome.

== History ==
Jovinianism spread into Rome and Milan and two followers of Jovinian, Sarmatio and Barbatianus, kept preaching his ideas after Jovinian was expelled. Other disciples of Jovinian included Auxentius, Genialis, Germinator, Felix, Prontinus, Martianus, Januarius and Ingeniosus. Because Sarmatio preached anti-ascetic ideas, Ambrose started to write to defend ascetism, calling him a "foolish talker".

Jovinianism was condemned by two synods, one in Rome and one in Milan, afterwards they were banished by Emperor Honorius, however some Jovinianists perhaps survived longer in the Alps. Jovinianism was also condemned by Pope Siricus. He opposed Jovinian, because Siricus was zealously opposed to marriage of clergy.

Later Erasmus was accused of the heresy of Jovinianism. So was Martin Luther, although Luther did not explicitly speak in favour of Jovinian and did not agree with Jerome's defence of ascetism.

== Teachings ==
Jovinian opposed monasticism and denied the perpetual virginity of Mary, Jovinian also taught that every believer will have an equal reward in heaven, argued that there is no difference between fasting and enjoying foods with thanksgiving, perhaps distinguished the church visible from the church invisible and limited the impossibility of relapse to the truly regenerate.
