= Geocentric creationism =

Pseudoscientific religious belief

Geocentric creationism is a religious belief held by a small subgroup of radical Young Earth Creationists who, in addition to asserting that the Earth was created between 6,000 and 10,000 years ago, also endorse the geocentric view of the Earth, which claims that Earth is stationary at the center of the universe. Advocates of Geocentric creationism believe that God placed the Earth at the center of the Universe to symbolize the uniqueness and centrality of humanity. This view is in direct contradiction to established scientific consensus on the movement of the Earth, biology and the age of the Earth and is thus classified as pseudoscientific. It is primarily followed by small segments of Protestant and Catholic fundamentalists alongside a few Orthodox Jews and Salafi Muslims. Geocentric creationism primarily grew out of a minority within the Creationist movement in the 20th century, particularly through the influence of Walter van der Kamp and Gerardus Bouw. The advocates of Geocentric creationism often relied on a variant of the Tychonic model, which attempted to preserve a geocentric framework while attempting to replicate the predictive accuracy of the heliocentric model’s account of celestial motions, however this view is generally rejected by the majority of modern Young Earth Creationists.

Geocentrism differs from modern flat Earth beliefs as they nevertheless affirm the scientific fact of the Earth's spherical shape, however despite being largely insignificant, the view has had a somewhat greater influence within the anti-evolutionist movement than those who believe in a flat Earth. However, like flat Earthers, geocentrists also reject much of modern physics, astronomy, and biology.

Geocentrism is rejected by the vast majority of Christians today, instead understanding the text of scripture to use phenomenological language that they believe was misunderstood to imply geocentrism in the medieval age.

== Background and history ==
=== Historical background ===
The geocentric view of cosmology—especially the Ptolemaic model influenced by Greek thought—remained the dominant framework until the Copernican Revolution of the 16th century. During which multiple Christian theologians such as Martin Luther, John Calvin, Philip Melancthon and the Catholic Robert Bellarmine rejected the implications of heliocentrism due to their understanding of the Bible.

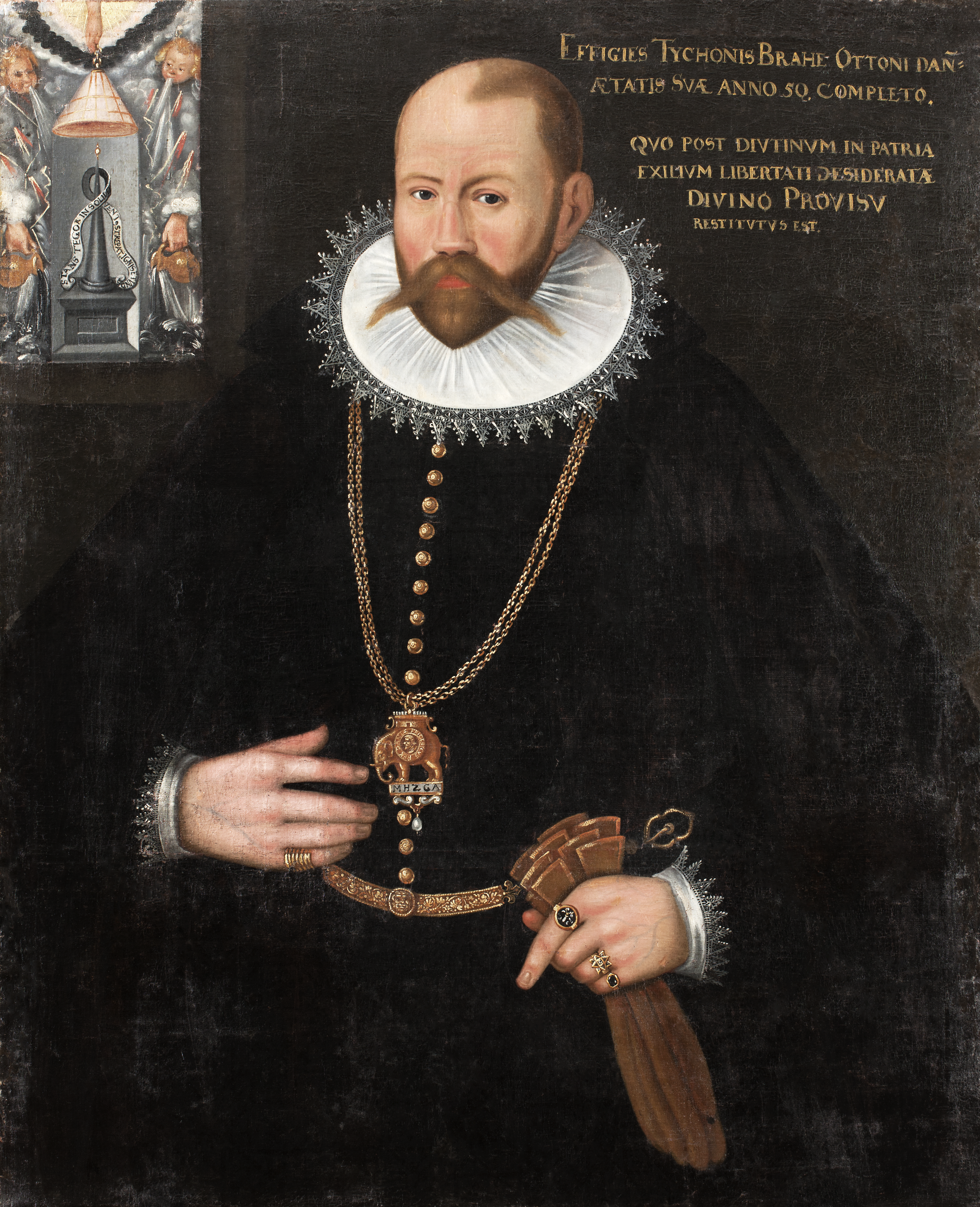
Portrait of Tycho Brahe

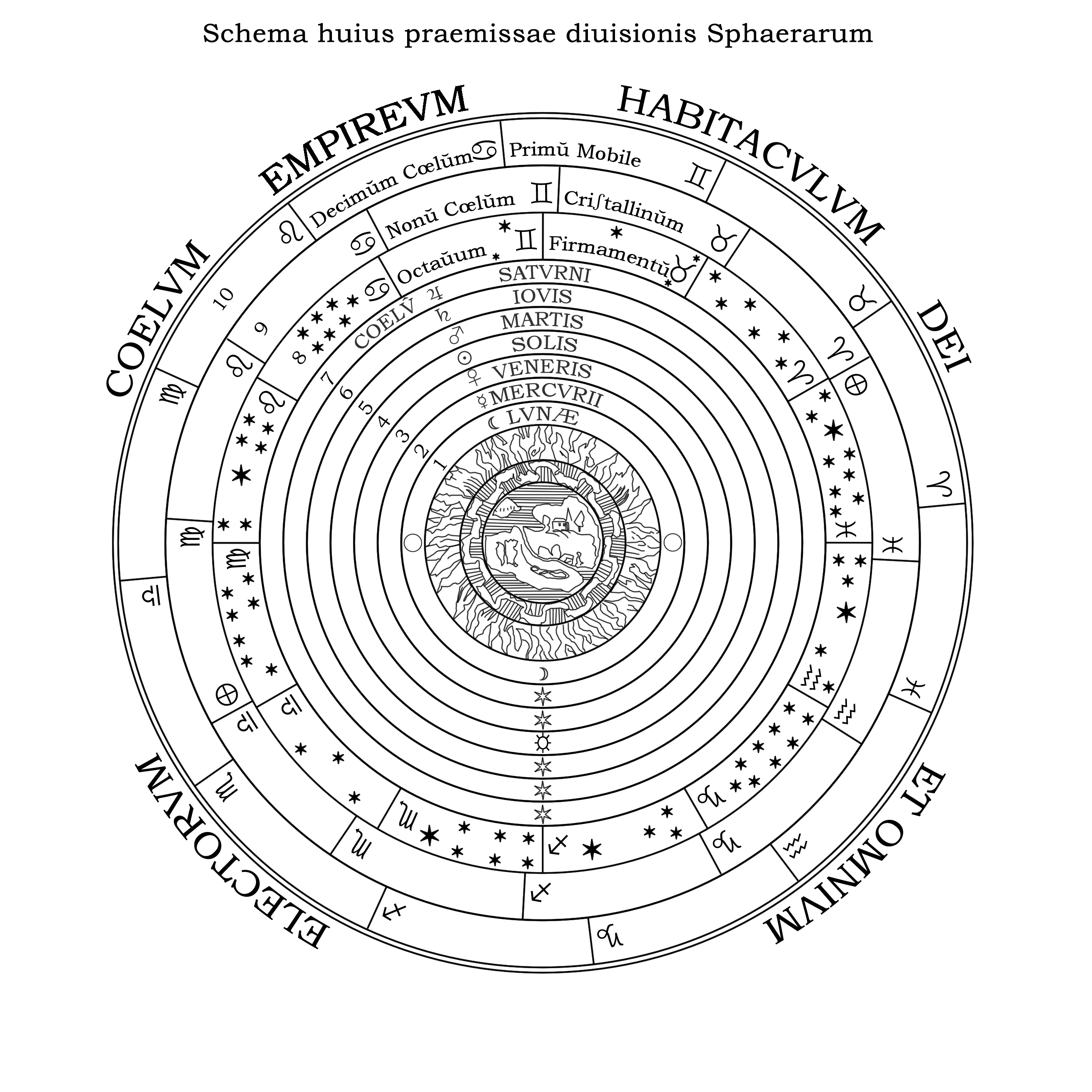
The Ptolemaic model of the Solarsystem, with each planet, the Moon and the Sun orbiting the Earth

Such individuals like Luther often were strong in their critiques of the Heliocentric model, and Luther is famously recorded as saying that Copernicus was a "fool who turned the whole science of astronomy upside down," reflecting his view that the new model contradicted Scripture and centuries of accepted truth.

Resistance to heliocentrism continued beyond theological objections. The Protestant Danish astronomer Tycho Brahe, also rejected the Copernican system. However, Brahe attempted to find scientific explanations for Geocentrism. Aware of the observational advantages of Copernicus's model of the Universe, particularly in explaining planetary motion—Brahe developed a compromised system that attempted to preserve the Geocentric model while attempting to explain the observations of planetary movement. In his model, the Sun and Moon revolved around the Earth, which remained stationary at the center of the universe, while the other planets orbited the Sun. This system was also adopted by many Jesuit astronomers of the 16th and 17th centuries. However, Tycho's successor and a fellow Protestant Johannes Kepler (1571 – 1630) did not follow Tycho's compromised theory, but instead defended the heliocentric view that all the planets orbit the Sun. Nevertheless, according to the Reformed professor R. Scott Clark, some Reformed theologians such as Wilhelmius A Brakel resisted heliocentrism even until the 18th century.

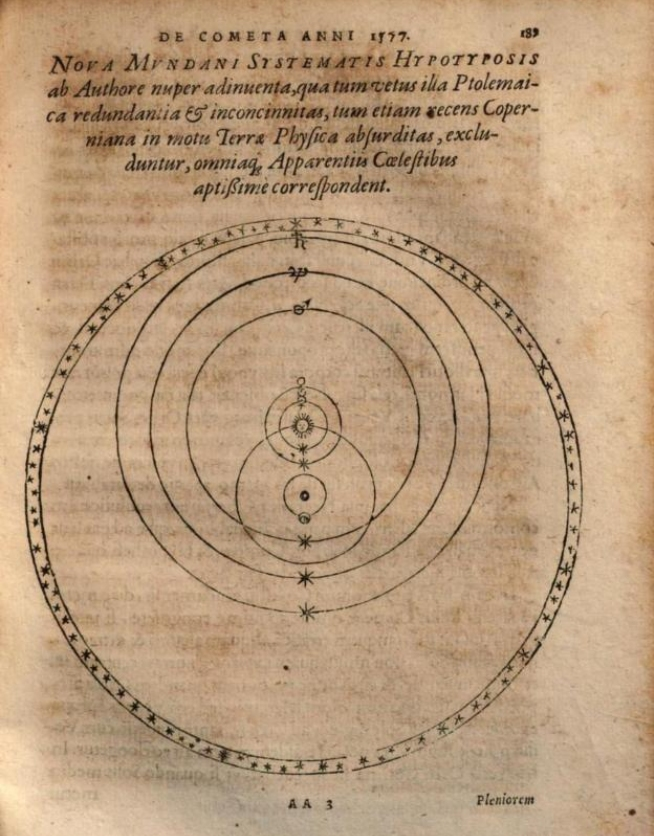
The compromised model of the Cosmos as theorized by Tycho Brahe, having the planets as orbiting the Sun rather than the Earth with the Sun, Moon and the Galaxy moving around the Earth.

==== Eastern Christianity ====
The "Galileo affair" happened in Western Christianity, for which Pope John Paul II later issued a verdict that admitted the condemnation of Galileo to have been an error. However, some Eastern Orthodox writers were also affected. Like in the West, many Eastern Christians had taught geocentrism, although they did not accept the Ptolemaic model of Geocentrism, but rather the system of Cosmas Indicopleustes. The first contacts with Russian Orthodoxy to Copernicus' heliocentrism came around the 17th century through a cosmological book which noted both models of Cosmology. For some time the hybrid model of Tycho Brahe was propagated as a better solution to the debates surrounding Geocentrism, although neither the Russian and Greek Orthodox ever condemned the Heliocentric, as they did not believe different cosmological theories to be dangerous.

=== Modern geocentric creationist movement ===
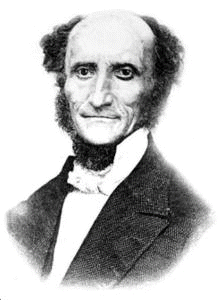
C. F. W. Walther advocated for Geocentric creationism.

Modern Christians generally reject the geocentric model, and the strict understanding of the verses used to defend it in the medieval age. However, despite scientific advances, even today few still try to cling unto the Geocentric model of the past. This has been influenced by the Dutch-Canadian named Walter van der Kamp founded the Tychonic Society around the 1970s, which promoted the geocentric view that Copernicus was mistaken and that the Earth remains stationary at the center of the universe. One of the most prominent geocentric creationists of the 20th century is the Protestant Gerardus Bouw, director of the Association for Biblical Astronomy and author of several books defending geocentrism. And although unlike other Geocentrist advocates, Bouw had a PhD in astronomy, his views are not taken seriously by the scientific community. The Geocentrist view was also defended by some 19th to 20th century Lutherans, including writers such as C. F. W. Walther, who critiqued the Coperincal stance in the publication Der Lutheraner. This stance was followed by Franz Pieper, making Geocentrism widely taught within the Lutheran Church Missouri Synod from 1870 to 1920.

The popular Islamic British Salafi-scholar Abu Iyaad is a staunch modern supporter of Geocentrism. He has published many articles speaking about and defending Geocentrism from a salafi-islamic perspective. He speaks about how the Quran and the hadiths explicitly imply a stationary, unmoving spherical earth. And that mainstream Astronomy is either wrong or completely lying about the existence of the solar system. He claims that institutes like NASA are using space as a way to deceive the public into believing ideas like evolution. He goes as far to say that calling earth a "planet" is a misguidance, and modern Astronomy should not be considered "real" science. He has worked with people like Abu Khadijah and the creator of aboutatheism.net to write articles critiquing NASA, heliocentrism, and Darwinian evolution.

Articles arguing that geocentrism was the biblical perspective appeared in some early creation science newsletters associated with the Creation Research Society pointing to some passages in the Bible which they interpreted as indicating a stationary earth, and the view was also defended in 1991 by Marshall Hall, although his book was received extremely badly by Young Earth Creationist organizations. Such religious beliefs have also been held by the traditionalist Catholic Robert Sungenis, co-author of the self-published Galileo Was Wrong: The Church Was Right (2006). Robert Sungenis attributed his acceptance of the geocentric model to the influence of creationist Gerardus Bouw around 2002. His work is frequently marked by criticism of mainstream scientific theories. One of his most know projects was the 2014 film The Principle, in which he featured interviews with scientists such as Lawrence Krauss. However, these scientists later stated they were unaware that the film was intended to promote geocentrism and publicly disavowed its message. Another known traditionalist Catholic known to have taken Geocentrist stances includes Solange Hertz. Alongside small segments of Christian Fundamentalism, there has also been a movement towards Geocentrism within some anti-evolutionary Orthodox Jewish groups, which is often motivated by the statements of the influential Rabbi Maimonides (1138–1204), who argued that the Earth is stationary.

The two largest modern geocentric creationist organizations include The Biblical Astronomer and Catholic Apologetics International. And there have been some signs of growth for geocentrism within creationism.

=== Creationist reaction ===
Both mainstream creationists and geocentrists agree that while the Bible is the only completely reliable source of information about knowledge on the natural world, they strongly differ on their understanding of scripture. Although some creationists such as Kent Hovind initially had a neutral opinion of geocentrism, the majority of the creationist movement have strongly rejected geocentrism, including the major organizations such as Answers in Genesis, Institute for Creation Research and Creation Ministries International, these organizations avoid association with Geocentric movements, as they believe these movements to be harmful to Christianity.

=== Impact ===
According to a report released in 2014 by the National Science Foundation, 26% of Americans surveyed believe that the Sun revolves around the Earth. Morris Berman quotes a 2006 survey that show currently some 20% of the U.S. population believe that the Sun goes around the Earth (geocentricism) rather than the Earth goes around the Sun (heliocentricism), while a further 9% claimed not to know. According to 2011 VTSIOM poll, 32% of Russians believe that the Sun orbits the Earth. However, these numbers may be influenced by scientific ignorance.

== Characteristics and beliefs ==
The Tychonic system shown in colour, with the objects that rotate around the Earth shown on blue orbits, and the objects that rotate around the Sun shown on orange orbits. Around all is a sphere of stars, which rotates.

The Modern Geocentrist movement form a radical movement within Creationism, arguing that their perceived "scientific assault" on the religion did not begin with Evolution, but with Heliocentrism. This view was explicitly held by Gerardus Bouw, who argued that the Copernican Revolution set the stage for the development of Biblical Criticism, and attacked the doctrine of Biblical literalism. He argued that the anthropocentric view of creation logically leads to a geocentric view of the Cosmos.

These proponents advocate for adopting the Tychonic system, which gets its name from the 16th-century Danish astronomer Tycho Brahe, which places the Earth at the center of the universe while allowing the planets to orbit the Sun. This model serves as a deliberate compromise between the strict geocentrism of the Ptolemaic system and the heliocentrism of Copernicus. At the heart of the modern Geocentric view is that the Earth and his creatures are special to God, and the status of the Earth at the center of the universe symbolizes this belief. They also believe that passages such as Joshua 10:12-13 in which God stops the sun over the valley of Ajalon are evidences of the earth being at the center of the solar system. Geocentrism has relied upon multiple verses in the Bible which seem to talk about the Earth not being moved, such as Psalm 93:1. However, due the shift from the strict interpretation of such passages, even the majority of creationists reject the strict geocentric interpretations of such passages, and instead view them phenomelogically.

=== Theological presuppositions ===
Geocentric creationism is based on a rejection of the mainstream scientific method in favour of supernatural explanations of the Universe, arguing that God created everything that exists within 6 days around 6000 years ago and created the Universe with the Earth at its very center. People such as Gerardus Bouw have argued that observation must be interpreted in harmony with the text of scripture, which he believed to be teaching a Geocentric model and that it needs to be the starting point in scientific inquiry. However, contrary to the views of Kepler and Galileo who although being Christians, believed that the scripture never speak of the inner workings of the solar system. Bouw criticized modern Christians, including the majority of Christian fundamentalists who agree with the claim that Bible does not speak on cosmological models. Instead, he favoured supernatural explanations of the movement of the universe and the solar system that he believed to better reflect his geocentric understanding of scripture, including claims such as the existence of aether, which he identified as the "firmanent" of Genesis 1. Due to this, he ended up modifying the cosmology of Tycho Brahe's model further by adjusting the stars also to be centered on the Sun rather than the Earth to explain the aberration of starlight. This way, he believed that his modified geocentric model would be observationally equivalent to heliocentrism, concluding that one needed theological rather than purely scientific reasoning to establish the correct position.

== Criticism ==
=== Theological criticism ===
Modern Young Earth creationists who reject Geocentrism have argued that the debate over Geocentrism and Heliocentrism in the 16th century arose not from a proper understanding of the Bible, but from the influence of Greek philosophy, critiquing the usage of verses from poetic books such as the Psalms to build a cosmological doctrine, rather arguing that such passages employ phenomenological language, not what happens literally in nature. Thus, they believe that while every claim of the Bible about the natural world is true, it should not be viewed as teaching geocentrism, as it only describes the rising of the Sun from our perspective as how it appears. Additionally, creationist critics have argued that the physical location of the Earth has no bearing on the theological idea that God's center of focus is the Earth.

From a Roman Catholic perspective, more mainstream Catholics have criticized those more radical traditional Catholics such as Sungenis and Solange Hertz for assuming that the Church ever made definitive statements in defense of geocentrism, additionally arguing that the early Christian theologians who held to a Geocentric view of the universe did not teach it as doctrine or as a part of the faith but merely assumed it as a part of the science of their day, additionally criticizing modern geocentrists for using passages mainly from books like the Psalms, which are written in poetic style.

Old Earth Creationists, including R. Scott Clark, contend that the Scriptures are written by God in a way that accommodates human understanding, meaning that Scripture should not be read like a scientific textbook. In this perspective, the Bible communicates to us in terms people of the time could understand, rather than providing a detailed scientific account of the Universe and the natural world.

=== Scientific criticisms ===
The fact that stellar parallax was so small that it was unobservable at the time was used as the main scientific argument against heliocentrism during the early modern age. It is clear from Euclid's geometry that the effect would be undetectable if the stars were far enough away, but for various reasons such gigantic distances involved seemed entirely implausible: it was one of Tycho's principal objections to Copernican heliocentrism that for it to be compatible with the lack of observable stellar parallax, there would have to be an enormous and unlikely void between the orbit of Saturn (then the most distant known planet) and the eighth sphere (the fixed stars).

Other methods of determine distance to stars have been developed and are consistent. One example was the New Horisons space probe.

Geocentric creationism stands in contradiction to modern physics, particularly in its mechanics of motion: the model requires the entire universe, including distant stars and galaxies, to revolve around a stationary Earth—implying speeds far exceeding that of light. The precise measurement of the daily rotation of the Earth is known as the Earth orientation parameters. One demonstration of the daily rotation of the Earth is the Foucault pendulum.

That the Earth orbits the Sun has long been established by scientific consensus, despite being rejected by geocentrists. This thus places Geocentrism into the category of pseudoscience.

Moreover there is the nutation of the Earth.

The long term Axial precession, also called “precession of the equinoxes” was known to the ancients and does not trouble geocentrists.
