= Robert Sungenis =

American traditionalist Catholic advocate (born c. 1955)

- Born: c. 1955 (age 70–71)

Academic background
- Education: George Washington University (BA); Westminster Theological Seminary (MA)

Academic work
- Discipline: Religious studies
- Sub-discipline: Catholic apologetics Geocentric creationism

Robert A. Sungenis (born c. 1955) is an American traditionalist Catholic apologist and advocate of geocentrism, the pseudoscientific belief that the Earth is the center of the universe. He has made statements about Jews and Judaism which have been criticized as being antisemitic, which he denies. Sungenis is a member of the Kolbe Center for the Study of Creation, a Catholic Young Earth creationist group.

== Early life and education ==
Sungenis was brought up in a Roman Catholic household and converted to Protestantism as a young man. He earned a Bachelor of Arts degree in religion from George Washington University in 1979 and a Master of Arts in theology from Westminster Theological Seminary in 1982. He reverted to Roman Catholicism in 1992.

In 2006 he received a Ph.D. in religious studies from the Calamus International University, an unaccredited distance-learning institution incorporated in the Republic of Vanuatu.

== Career ==
=== Harold Camping controversy ===
A former Family Radio employee, Sungenis was quoted in the media in 1994 as being critical of Harold Camping's prediction that the world would soon end, although Sungenis also claimed that Camping was a "very intelligent and thoughtful person" and a "moral and upstanding citizen." Sungenis later published a book, Shockwave 2000!: The Harold Camping 1994 Debacle, about the lead-up and aftermath of Camping's prophecy.

=== Apologetics ===
After his conversion back to Roman Catholicism, Sungenis became a traditionalist Catholic. He wrote Not By Faith Alone, a book of apologetics, explaining his view of the Catholic Church's doctrine of justification and his critique of the Protestant doctrine of salvation by faith alone.

His group Catholic Apologetics International has been designated a hate group by the Southern Poverty Law Center.

=== Jews and Judaism ===
Sungenis' writings include antisemitic ideas, sources, and claims about the Jews and Judaism and have been criticized by fellow Catholics and by the Southern Poverty Law Center, as has the publishing company he founded and uses to publish his books, Catholic Apologetics International. In 2002, he said it was a fact that no one had ever proven that 6 million Jews were murdered during the Holocaust and that demographic statistics show no real difference in the number of Jews living before and after World War II (see Historical Jewish population comparisons). According to the Southern Poverty Law Center, he also "repeated a series of ancient anti-Semitic canards" and later wrote about the involvement of Jews and Israel in a Zionist Satanic conspiracy aimed at Satan ruling the world.

In 2006 Sungenis campaigned against a sentence in the United States Catholic Catechism for Adults (USCCA) which at that time read, "Thus the covenant that God made with the Jewish people through Moses remains eternally valid for them." Sungenis believed it implied that the Jews can be saved without believing in Jesus, and people who read the forum began repeating his complaint to Catholic authorities. In the summer of 2008, the United States Conference of Catholic Bishops (USCCB) voted to remove the sentence and replace it with a quote from the Epistle to the Romans: "To the Jewish people, whom God first chose to hear his word, belong the sonship, the glory, the covenants, the giving of the law, the worship, and the promises; to them belong the patriarchs, and of their race, according to the flesh, is the Christ." Monsignor Daniel Kutys said that the sentence was not changed because of what Sungenis said, but because of the misunderstanding that Sungenis' blog had generated.

By 2008 his local bishop had instructed him to stop writing about Jews and to remove the name "Catholic" from his blog.

In 2014 Sungenis stated that he would no longer write about Jewish issues that are political in nature and that he would remove content about Jews and Judaism, but he still maintained that the Jews as an ethnic group do not have a covenant with God. In 2014, during an interview on the Christian Broadcasting Network about his geocentrism movie, he was asked about people describing him as denying the holocaust and being antisemitic. He said: "I had to make a public statement, and I made two separate statements -- 'I believe in the holocaust (you know), I love the Jewish people, I’m not an anti-semite.'"

=== Geocentrism ===
According to Sungenis, he became interested in geocentrism around 2002 after he read the book, Geocentricity by Gerardus D. Bouw. Sungenis became an advocate for the idea by 2006. He believes that the earth does not rotate and has offered $1,000 via his group, Catholic Apologetics International, to anyone who could prove that the Earth moves around the Sun.

By 2011, he was the leader of a small group that was advocating for the Church to condemn Galileo and which viewed the heliocentric model as part of a conspiracy to undermine the authority of the church in society more generally. He self-published a three-volume book called Galileo Was Wrong and runs a blog called Galileo Was Wrong in which he promotes these ideas.

In 2014, Sungenis, along with Rick Delano, was an executive producer of The Principle, a documentary which advocates for his ideas about geocentrism. The movie features interviews with Lawrence Krauss, Michio Kaku, Max Tegmark, Julian Barbour, and George F. R. Ellis, and was narrated by Kate Mulgrew, and was briefly in the news in 2014 when Mulgrew and the physicists said that the filmmakers did not honestly explain the purpose of their film to them. The release date of the film was October 24, 2014, when it was screened at the Marcus Addison Cinema in Addison, Illinois, according to the distributor Rocky Mountain Pictures. As of April 30, 2015, the film had grossed $89,543.

== See also ==
- K. C. Paul, an Indian man who also promotes geocentrism
