= Jovinian =

4th century opponent of Christian asceticism

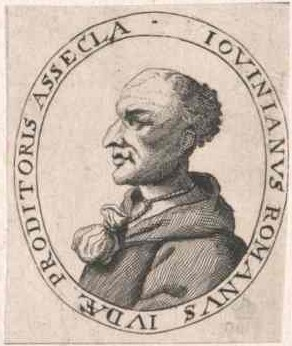
- Imaginary portrait, c. 1700
- Born: 4th century AD; Corduene
- Died: 405
- Theological work
- Era: Patristic Age
- Tradition or movement: Jovinianism
- Main interests: Asceticism
- Notable ideas: Opposition to Monasticism; Equality in heaven; Opposition to ascetism; Denial of the perpetual virginity of Mary

Jovinian (Latin: Iovinianus; died c. 405) was an opponent of Christian asceticism in the 4th century and was condemned as a heretic at synods convened in Rome under Pope Siricius and in Milan by Ambrose in 393 because of his views. Our information about him is derived principally from the work of Jerome in two books, Adversus Jovinianum. Jerome referred to him as the "Epicurus of Christianity". He was a native of Corduene, in present day Turkey. John Henry Newman called Aerius of Sebaste, Jovinian and Vigilantius the forerunners of Protestantism, likening them to the "Luther, Calvin, and Zwingli of the fourth century". Other Protestants also praise Jovinian as an early reformer or even credit him as the "first Protestant". Jovinian's teachings received much popular support in Rome and Milan and his followers Sarmatio and Barbatianus kept preaching his ideas after Jovinian was expelled.

== Life ==
Jovinian was a monk at one time in his life, but subsequently turned against monastic asceticism—though without giving up his status as monk. Jovinian was apparently broadly read and adduced examples from secular literature, which did not sit well at the synods. He became the leader of a group of disciples: Auxentius, Genialis, Germinator, Felix, Prontinus, Martianus, Januarius and Ingeniosus are identified in the act of 390 condemning him. His writings praising the excellence of marriage, which he published from Rome, were condemned at a synod held in Rome under Pope Siricius and subsequently at the Milan synod.

Jovinian, in the polemical view of his chief opponent, Jerome, has some of the style of an "Epicurus of Christianity." The following is a passage attributed to Jovinian by Jerome in his "Against Jovinian":

I respond to your invitation, not that I may go through life with a high reputation, but may live free from idle rumour. I beseech the ground, the young shoots of our plantations, the plants and trees of tenderness snatched from the whirlpool of vice, to grant me audience and the support of many listeners. We know that the Church through hope, faith, charity, is inaccessible and impregnable. In it no one is immature: all are apt to learn: none can force a way into it by violence, or deceive it by craft.

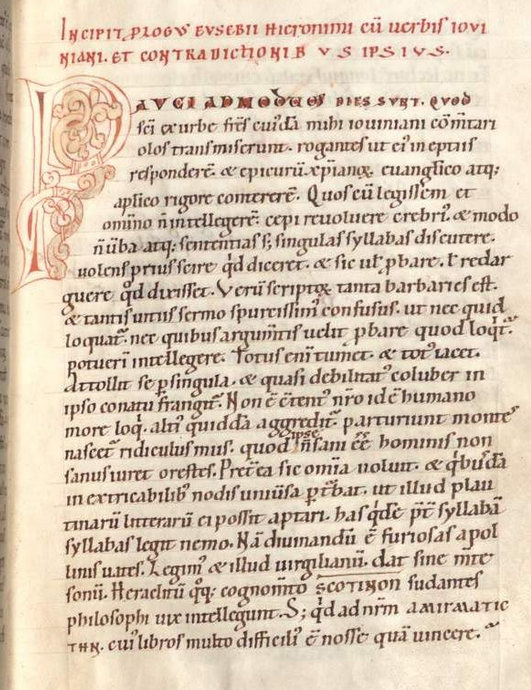
Against Jovinian (12th century manuscript)

Little is known of the later career of Jovinian. In 398 he was sentenced by the emperor to be flogged and exiled to the island of Boa in the Adriatic sea. From a remark in Jerome's work Against Vigilantius, written in 409, that he "amidst pheasants and pork rather belched out than breathed out his life", it is inferred by some that he was then dead.

Despite seeing marriage as an honorable state, Jovinian himself did not marry, so that he was not kept busy by the state of marriage.

== Teachings ==
The writings of Jovinian were sent to Jerome by his friend Pammachius. Jerome replied to them in a long treatise in two books, written in 393. Many of Jovinian's views could be considered contrary to ascetic ideals that were gaining prominence in the era, and would ultimately influence what constitutes Roman Catholic orthodoxy today.

He felt that virgins, widows and married women, even remarried widows, are of equal merit in the Christian community. Jovinian addressed his virginal reader:

I do you no wrong, Virgin: you have chosen a life of chastity on account of the present distress: you determined on the course in order to be holy in body and spirit: be not proud: you and your married sisters are members of the same Church…Now concerning virgins I have no commandment of the Lord: but I give my judgement, as one that hath obtained mercy of the Lord to be faithful. I think therefore that this is good by reason of the present distress, namely, that it is good for a man to be as he is… See, the Apostle confesses that as regards virgins he has no commandment of the Lord, and he who had with authority laid down the law respecting husbands and wives, does not dare to command what the Lord has not enjoined. And rightly too. For what is enjoined is commanded, what is commanded must be done, and that which must be done implies punishment if it be not done. For it is useless to order a thing to be done and yet leave the individual free to do it or not do it. If the Lord had commanded virginity He would have seemed to condemn marriage, and to do away with the seed-plot of mankind, of which virginity itself is a growth. If He had cut off the root, how was He to expect fruit If the foundations were not first laid, how was He to build the edifice, and put on the roof to cover all! Excavators toil hard to remove mountains; the bowels of the earth are pierced in the search for gold. And, when the tiny particles, first by the blast of the furnace, then by the hand of the cunning workman have been fashioned into an ornament, men do not call him blessed who has separated the gold from the dross but him who wears the beautiful gold. Do not marvel then if, placed as we are, amid temptations of the flesh and incentives to vice, the angelic life be not exacted of us, but merely recommended. If advice be given, a man is free to proffer obedience; if there be a command, he is a servant bound to compliance.

Jovinian also maintained that abstinence is no better than the partaking of food in the right disposition. Looking back into the creation, Jovinian stated that God gave dominion to humanity over the creation. After the great flood, God allowed humanity to take food not only from plants, but also from animals. St. Paul in the New Testament also teaches that all food is clean if they are eaten with thankfulness (Romans 14:20). Another point that Jovinian argues is, "they who with full assurance of faith have been born again in baptism, cannot be overthrown by the devil." As Jerome critiques in his treatise, Jerome alters the word "overthrown" with "tempted". This may show that either Jerome missed a point that Jovinian was making, as his argument on this point was much shorter. The word "overthrow" may have indicated much more significance than a believer committing sin since Jovinian believed that a believer was able to sin after the baptism. He wrote that if they do sin, they must repent. Rather, Jovinian seems to have been arguing that something significant occurs in the life of the believer when he or she is baptized, something that goes beyond peccability. This quote reveals a concern not simply over the presence of sin, but over the future state of believers. Jovinian evidently argued that baptism, administered “with full assurance of faith”, places believers in a state in which the blessings they experience as a result are not diminished by the presence of sin.

In other words, Jovinian argued for what historian David Hunter called the final indefectibility of believers rather than their personal impeccability. Those who are baptized into the Church are in a permanent state of grace. Jovinian limited the impossibility of relapse to the truly regenerate, thus his teaching on perseverance has affinities with Augustine's gift of perseverance and the Calvinist doctrine of perseverance of the saints. However Jovinian did not derive his view of eternal security from a doctrine of predestination, but instead from his denial of works having merit.

The fourth proposition stated is, "there is one reward in the kingdom of heaven for all who have kept their baptismal vow." Referencing Matthew 25:31-46 about sheep and goats, the judgment of humanity through the flood, and the destruction of Sodom and Gomorrah, Jovinian stated, “There is one salvation for those who are released, one destruction for those who stay behind”. Jovinian rejected the idea that believers should be divided into classes, some more spiritual than others, because the New Testament repeatedly emphasizes that all believers partake of the body and blood of Christ (John 6:56), that the Holy Spirit indwells all believers (1 Cor 6:19), and that the Church itself is one. For these reasons, the common teaching that an ascetic lifestyle produces greater reward should be rejected. All believers possess the presence of Christ and are part of the same body. Therefore, all experience the same reward.

Many scholars have argued that for Jovinian, works did not justify a man, thus holding to a Protestant view of justification, which is by faith alone. It has been argued that Jovinian believed in a distinction between the visible and invisible churches, based on his statement that the Church is founded on faith, and that all in the Church are taught by God and that no "unripe" members exist within the Church and no one can enter the church "by fraud".

Jovinian distinguished physical baptism and baptism of the Holy Spirit, which confers grace to the believer.

From a letter of the synod at Milan to Pope Siricius (Ambrose, Epistle xlii) and from Augustine's book Contra Julian ii, it is clear that Jovinian also denied the perpetual virginity of Mary.

The counter of Jerome to this "Epicurus of Christianity" took a whole book to praise virginity and disparage the state of marriage, based upon Paul's remarks in 1 Corinthians 7. The work was couched in abusive and intemperate language that appalled Pammachius, who found it excessive in its praise of virginity and in depreciation of marriage. Jerome did not approve of democratic distribution of bliss in the life to come:

Perhaps those who have been married twice or thrice ought not to complain, for the same whoremonger if penitent is made equal in the kingdom of heaven even to virgins.

Efforts to suppress it failed, however, and Jerome's work obtained a wide circulation.

Geoffrey Chaucer mentions Jovinian with scorn in the "Summoner's Tale" of his Canterbury Tales, lines 221-3:

...lyke Iouinian
Fat as a whale and walkynge as a swan
As vinolent as botel in the spence

== Reaction ==
In addition to Jerome, Jovinian was also opposed by Ambrose and Augustine, though Augustine was moved by the controversy to write his own work praising marriage, De bono coniugali, despite disagreeing with some views of Jovinian. Pope Siricius later excommunicated Jovinian and his followers, because he was zealously opposed to any marriage of clergy.

Later in the Protestant reformation, Jovinian has been seen as a "witness of truth", while he is most often seen as a heretic by Catholics.

== See also ==
- Proto-Protestantism
- Antidicomarianites
- Bonosians
- Helvidius
- Vigilantius
- Aerius
- Sarmatio
- Barbatinus
