= Aerius =

Aerius may refer to:

- Aerius of Sebaste, a presbyter of Sebaste in Pontus in the 4th century
- Desloratadine, a drug used to treat allergies
