= Dimoerites =

Dimoerites may refer to either of two early Christian sects:

- Apollinarism
- Antidicomarism
