= Solange Hertz =

American Catholic writer (1920–2015)

- Solange Hertz in 1965
- Born: Nellie Solange Strong; January 1, 1920; Washington D.C., U.S.
- Died: October 3, 2015 (aged 95); Leesburg, Virginia, U.S.
- Education: American University (BA)
- Occupations: Author; theological commentator
- Known for: Traditionalist Catholicism
- Spouse: Gustav Crane Hertz (m. 1938; died 1967)
- Children: 5

Nellie Solange Strong Hertz (née Strong; January 1, 1920 – October 3, 2015) was an American traditionalist Catholic author, who published almost two dozen books on Catholicism, and wrote for magazines The Remnant and America. Her writings were strongly conservative and defended topics such as capital punishment, monarchy, and gender roles. She was also the first woman to ever be offered a scholarship to Georgetown University, though she instead elected to attend the American University, at the age of 15.

In 1965, she received national media and federal attention during the Vietnam War when her husband, Gustav Crane Hertz, was kidnapped by Viet Cong guerrillas in Saigon. The highest ranking prisoner ever captured by the Viet Cong, Gustav's kidnapping spurred several failed government negotiations to rescue him, including a proposed prisoner swap that was rejected by the White House. Political figures including Robert F. Kennedy, Cherif Guellal, Abba P. Schwartz, Nguyễn Hữu Thọ, and Norodom Sihanouk were all directly involved with the case, with several of them having directly communicated with Solange. In 1967, following two years of negotiations, all attempts at rescue ultimately failed when Gustav perished from malaria in captivity. Gustav's body was finally returned to Solange and buried in their hometown after three decades.

== Early life and education ==
Nellie Solange Strong was born in Washington, D.C., on January 1, 1920, the only child to John Logan Strong and Andree Laurans Strong. At age 15, Solange graduated from Western High School in Washington, D.C., as the class valedictorian. She was the first female recipient of the school's scholarship to the (at that time) all-male Georgetown University. Solange had unexpectedly won the scholarship with an essay about the U.S. Constitution, that she had written in 1935 as a senior at Western High School. Since Georgetown was all-male, the scholarship was transferred to American University, where she attended instead. At American University, Solange graduated summa cum laude with a BA in Classical Language on June 5, 1939, at the age of 19.

== Life and career ==
=== Family ===
Solange married her classmate, Gustav Crane Hertz, in 1938. The two fell in love in her senior year there, with her remarking that, "I was supposed to be a teacher, for which I had no aptitude, so I got married". The couple settled in Leesburg, Virginia, where they bought their home, an old historic farmhouse (which would serve as the motivation for her first book, Old Stone Houses of Loudoun County, Virginia). Solange and Gustav went on to have a total of five children together: Lydia Logan Hertz, Gustav Jr., Stephen, Christina (Tina), and Crane. At the time of her death in 2015, she was survived by four of her five children (with Lydia having died in 1997), as well as 19 grandchildren, and 50 great-grandchildren.

=== Vietnam war ===
Solange Hertz's husband, Gustav, was the chief public administrator for the U.S. Agency for International Development’s mission in Vietnam. Having been assigned the position in 1963, he traveled all over South Vietnam, teaching civil administration across the war-torn country. The Hertz family resided for some time in Vietnam, enjoying the local Vietnamese way of life. Solange initially preferred living among the Vietnamese to American life, despite occasional Viet Cong terrorism. On this, she explained that "I'm not the nervous type."

On the afternoon of Tuesday, Feb. 2, 1965, at about 2:30 P.M., Gustav went out for a leisurely motorcycle ride in Saigon and disappeared. At the time of his kidnapping, Gustav was the highest-ranking prisoner to be taken captive by the Viet Cong. By early that evening, Solange Hertz reported her husband missing, but any attempt to search for him was initially delayed. With it being the Lunar New Year, the Viet Cong had previously observed a truce over the holidays. Additionally, no other U.S. civilian advisor had been kidnapped by the Viet Cong before Gustav, leading authorities to doubt that he had actually been captured.

Hertz's frantic calls to U.S. military authorities eventually lead to the opening of an investigation. It took two days after his disappearance before U.S. authorities had even bothered to travel up the street to look for him. The pace of the search for Gustav was forcibly sped up 40 hours after his disappearance, when Presidential Assistant McGeorge Bundy had arrived in Saigon for an inspection visit. Bundy was informed that "our Public Administration guy has been kidnapped", which accelerated the search for Gustav. State Department officials had acknowledged at the time that any further investigation into Gustav's disappearance would likely be a waste, as too much time had passed before they started searching for him. One official stated that "Within four minutes after the V.C. got Hertz, they had hidden him where we never could have found him."

10 days after his disappearance, on February 12, Hertz received an envelope in the mail, containing two letters. The first was a handwritten letter from Gustav, stating he would be returning home within a week. The handwriting matched her husband's, but the letter addressed her "Solange", rather than "Nellie", which he had always called her. The second letter was written in Vietnamese, and was signed by a man who revealed himself as a representative of the Viet Cong in the village of Thu Duc, which was located five miles north of Saigon. The letter gave Hertz instructions on what to do to discuss the conditions of her husband's release, but gave a date set for a meeting four days before she received the letter in the mail. With the letter having taken too long to reach her, Hertz was unable to follow the Viet Cong's instructions, with the first letter marking the last time Hertz ever heard from her husband.

Given that kidnapping of a civilian prisoner by the Viet Cong was unprecedented, the U.S. government had no real conduct to follow. Hertz also tried enlisting the help of Catholic clergy (which held contacts in the Vietnamese countryside) as well as the French (having been informed that the French mission in Hanoi could possibly get word to the Viet Cong). Ultimately though, all attempts at negotiation failed. Hertz returned to Leesburg, Virginia with her children in March, so that closer proximity to Washington D.C. would allow her to apply pressure to the State Department and White House for Gustav's release. Here, her brother-in-law, Burke Hertz, assisted her in pressuring the state department to rescue Gustav. Soon after, the Saigon government arrested and condemned a terrorist, Nguyen Van Thai, to death for the March 30 bombing of the U.S. embassy. The Viet Cong then used Gutav's life as a threat of retaliatory execution if Thai was killed. Thai's execution was postponed to spare Gustav's life, though this ran counter to the South Vietnamese desire to see Thai executed for his crimes. In 1965, Prime Minister Nguyễn Cao Kỳ came into office and vowed to carry out all death sentences against those on death row, including Thai. U.S. administrative officials managed to convince Ky to exempt Thai, for the sake of Gustav. Meanwhile, several U.S. government attempts were made for the release of her husband, and an unsuccessful prisoner exchange led by then-Senator Robert F. Kennedy. Kennedy attempted to help the Hertz family after members of Congress were approached by Solange for help. Kennedy, through an Algerian ambassador, came into contact with a one time guerilla fighter named Huynh Van Tam.

Tam informed the Algerian ambassador, who informed Kennedy in turn, that the Viet Cong would agree to a prisoner swap: Gustav Hertz for Nguyen Van Thai. Kennedy referred the prisoner swap proposal to the White House, who rejected it on the grounds that a civilian was not of equal value as a convicted terrorist and that the U.S. should not negotiate with the Viet Cong in such a fashion, among other reasons. The Hertz family was bewildered and angered at the White House's rejection of the deal, with Solange stating that her husband was being sacrificed to "maintain the fake image that the U.S. had absolutely nothing to do with the politics and government of South Vietnam." Cambodian Chief of State Norodom Sihanouk, also provided some contact to the Hertz family. In July 1966, Sihanouk provided a letter to Abba Scwartz, a lawyer working on the case, stating that Hertz was being treated "humanely" and was in "rather good health." Later unsuccessful attempts were made, including a rejected ransom of about $20,000 (U.S. dollars at that time) in 1966, though all efforts ultimately fell through. Sihanouk later told Solange that the Viet Cong informed him that Gustav had died in captivity, from malaria on September 24, 1967, at the age of 49.

Initially, Gustav's kidnapping drew only a small amount of media attention. However, in June 1967, the Viet Cong Liberation Radio announced Gustav had been executed; drawing far more attention to the case. Some of the Hertz family clutched at hope for a short time after this radio message, as the surname 'Hertz' had been incorrectly pronounced, leading them to believe he may still be alive. However, Gustav's brother, Burke Hertz, admitted that the broadcast "may be their way of finally telling us." Shortly after the radio broadcast, Solange Hertz was informed through intermediaries that Gustav had not been executed, but actually had died of malaria in a North Vietnamese prison.

In 1973, Gustav's name appeared on a list delivered to the U.S. government of Americans who had perished in Vietnamese captivity.

Three decades later, a long search for his remains by the State Department concluded following a successful DNA match, due in part to the lobbying of Burke Hertz. Solange Hertz later buried her husband in 2002 (Note: Solange Hertz's obituary states Gustav Hertz was buried in 2002, whereas Scheel's article reports that he was buried on February 18, 2001.) in the cemetery of the family church, St. John the Apostle in Leesburg, Virginia.

=== Writer ===
Hertz was a prolific writer, supporting her five children in part with the publication of almost two dozen books on Catholicism and spirituality. Her work was featured in several local publications, including the Loudoun Times-Mirror, the Washington Evening Star, the Antiques and others. She also wrote for numerous Catholic periodicals and magazines such as America, Immaculata, The Remnant, Triumph, and others.

== Views ==
Hertz's work defended traditional Catholic views on family and the Tridentine Mass; often attacking Feminism, Americanism, Scientism, and Freemasonry. Hertz described herself as a "counter-revolutionary."

=== Capital punishment ===
In 2001, Hertz argued in favor of capital punishment, writing that to argue against it was "to contend with constituted reality. Ever since Adam and Eve committed the Original Sin, every living creature is subject to it. Every one of us is born on Death Row and lives out his allotted lifespan in its shadow without hope of reprieve...there has always been a death penalty. God instituted it, and He was the first to impose it, embedding it in the very fabric of natural law."

=== Contraception ===
Hertz was opposed to both artificial contraception, which the Catholic Church considers "intrinsically evil", and Natural Family Planning, which it deems permissible in limited circumstances. Hertz wrote that "the abomination of desolation is contraception…particularly as practiced by His own people in the guise of so-called "natural family planning"... Standing poised in the holy place to destroy souls and bodies at the very source of life in the Christian family, contraception is proving to be the apex and consummation of that old Master heresy from which all Christian heresies have derived."

Hertz also asserted that Jesus and the Virgin Mary did not ever possess nocturnal emissions or menstruation, respectively, due to the fact that both are a result of Original Sin. She argues that had humanity remained in "perfect harmony with God's designs", then people "would not require the physical relief of periodic discharges to correct imbalances."

=== Gender roles ===
Hertz was a critic of feminism, often writing that gender distinction was divinely ordered. Hertz's view was that a woman's role as a housewife and mother did not make her inferior to men, but significant and equal in her own unique right. In her article The Housewife as Guerilla, she wrote that women's liberationists were cowardly and that "A real woman wants man’s role in society as she wants hair on her face."

Hertz also wrote that there was no "confusion about woman’s role in the world. God clearly defined it when He created mankind male and female, and it has never changed... The whole vocation of woman rests in being God’s help to man, to whom she is united indissolubly in one human nature." She also discussed the relationship between sexual intercourse between husband and wife, with the man's role as that of a gardener in the marriage bed, "'to till and to keep' when he promises to love, cherish, and protect his wife" and the woman's as a gardener, for "In all literatures and mythologies the earth is the figure of a woman."

=== Monarchy ===
Herz wrote that monarchy was "the only form of government formally and positively sanctioned in Scripture and Tradition” and consonant with the "very order of Persons in the Most Blessed Trinity, where God the Father is Source of both the Son and the Holy Spirit.”

Hertz was critical towards the French Revolution, stating its effect must not be minimized. She described King Louis XVI as "Christ's constituted vicar in the temporal order" and that had "his throne endured, the collapse of Christian law and order which eventually left the Church everywhere at the mercy of the State would not have been possible." She wrote that the King of France was "constituted a quasi-bishop in the temporal order" and defended the practice of the royal touch as "miraculously effective, provided only that the monarch was in the state of grace", citing Charles X's miraculous healing of eleven victims of scrofula who presented themselves before him. Hertz likewise considered Charles X to be the last true King of France, on the basis that the other four French monarchs after Louis XVI's execution (Napoleon I, Louis XVIII, Louis Philippe I, & Napoleon III) were never "anointed or consecrated by any prelate of the Holy Catholic Church". She also distinguished Napoleon I's ceremonial coronation from that of an anointed one, and stated that Napoleon came to power due to the French people's "natural craving for monarchy".

=== Sin ===
Hertz's writings developed deep into the topic of sin and how to resist it. On the topic of gluttony, she wrote that the "control of gluttony is therefore the key to the whole spiritual life", and emphasized the importance of moderation in eating and fasting. Hertz, following the advice of the early Christian Fathers, recommended conquering gluttony by "anchoring the mind in the contemplation of divine things" and following three rules, which include only eating at designated times, only eating what is set before you, and always finishing the meal with "room for more".

She also identified gluttony as closely related to sexual lust, observing that both possess "a specific, intense pleasure attached to it which is ordered to the preservation of life." As such, Hertz argues that gluttony, like lust, "therefore consists in seeking, either mentally or physically, the pleasure apart from the purpose God ordained it to serve, or seeking it primarily."

== Public reception ==
Writer Stefanie Nicholas gave a positive review to Hertz's work Women, Words, and Wisdom. Historian Charles A. Coulombe has spoken positively of Hertz's work. Supreme Court Justice Antonin Scalia defended Hertz's views on capital punishment.

Catholic apologist Karl Keating criticized Hertz for her geocentrist beliefs.

== Death ==
Hertz died at age 95 on October 3, 2015, at a nursing home in Leesburg, Virginia. She had previously been admitted to hospice in 2014 due to severe respiratory distress, which she faced with her "sense of humor" intact. The cause of death was cancer and complication from strokes, according to her granddaughter, Elizabeth Puglise.

== Selected bibliography ==
=== Books ===
- Old Stone Houses of Loudoun County, Virginia, (1950) [as Solange Strong]
- Women, Words, & Wisdom, (1959) [as Solange Hertz]
- Come Down, Zacchaeus, (1961)
- Searcher of Majesty, (1963)
- Feast for a Week, (1964)
- The Occult Franklin, (1983)
- The Star-Spangled Heresy: Americanism, (1992, 2012) ISBN 9780988353701
- Utopia Nowhere, (1993, 2016) ISBN 9780984236596
- The Thought of Their Heart: On Devotion to the Sacred Heart and the Holy Rosary (1994, 2015) ISBN 9780988353770
- Beyond Politics, (1995)
- Sin Revisited (1996, 2015) ISBN 9780988353763
- On the Contrary (1997, 2011) ISBN 9780984236534
- Apostasy in America (1998, 2012) ISBN 9780988353718
- The Battle for Amerindia (2000) ISBN 9781890740078
- The Sixth Trumpet (2002)
- The Passion of the Church (2005)
- Come Down, Zacchaeus: Adventures in Scripture (2016) ISBN 9781944339029

=== Articles ===
- "Tomorrow's Wife and Mother", America (13 May 1967)
- "Among Women", (April 1972)
- "The Woman and Her Home: 1. The Home as Divine Mystery", (May 1972)
- "The Woman and her Home: 2. The Housewife's Vocation According to Saint Paul", (June 1972)
- "The Crack in the Board", (July 1972)
- "Thoughts on the Working Mother: Housewife as Martyr", (October 1972)
- "Walls, Roof and Door: The Home as Sanctuary", (January, 1973)
- "The Housewife as Guerrilla", (April 1973)
- "D'abord, The Home: Mama's Manifesto", Triumph (July 1973)
- "Discovering the Real Christopher Columbus", The Remnant (October 1992)
- "Will He Find Faith...in the third millennium?", (November 1993)
- "Horses and Mules", (January 1997)
- "Out of the Murk", The Remnant (15 January 1998)
- "Quo Vadis, Petre?", The Remnant (16 July 1999)
- "The Death Penalty, Instituted by God Himself (The Biblical Basis for Catholic Teaching on Capital Punishment)", (March 2001)
- "The Real World", (28 February 2002)
- "A Revelation for America and for Our Times", The Remnant (31 March 2002)
- "The Scientific Illusion", The Remnant (February 2003)
- "Is the Black Mass Valid", (2006)
- "Joan of Arc: Scourge of Modern Feminists", The Remnant (31 July 2008)
- "The Housewife as Martyr", (29 August 2011)
- "The Home as Divine Mystery", (15 January 2012)
- "Russia and the Mother of God", (2 April 2014)
- "Will Rome Lose the Faith? (La Salette Revisited)", (26 August 2014)
