= Bonosus of Sardica =

Bishop and friend of St. Jerome

Bonosus was a Bishop of Sardica in the latter part of the fourth century, who taught against the doctrine of the perpetual virginity of Mary. His followers were later labelled "Bonosians" and considered heretical.

The council of Capua (391) condemned Bonosus and tried to excommunicate him, but Bonosus did not stop using his episcopal functions. The Bonosians rebaptized converts.

After the condemnation of Bonosus, he started his own sect.

== See also ==
- Antidicomarianites, Christians who denied the perpetual virginity of Mary
- Helvidius
- Jovinian
