= Against Jovinianus =

Apologetic work by Saint Jerome

Against Jovinianus (Latin: Adversus Jovinianum) is a two-volume treatise by the Church Father Saint Jerome.

== Jovinian's propositions ==
Jovinian, about whom little more is known than what is to be found in Jerome's treatise, published a Latin treatise outlining several opinions:

1. That a virgin is no better, as such, than a wife in the sight of God.
2. Abstinence from food is no better than a thankful partaking of food.
3. A person baptized with the Spirit as well as with water cannot sin (as interpreted by Jerome; other commentators argue that Jovinian was actually referring to the impossibility of lapsing from Christianity)
4. All sins are equal.
5. There is but one grade of punishment and one of reward in the future state.

In addition to this, he held the birth of Jesus Christ to have been by a "true parturition"; that is, he disagreed with the common belief of his time, according to which the infant Jesus passed through the walls of the womb, as his resurrected body afterwards did out of the tomb or through closed doors.

== Response to Jovinian ==
Pammachius, Jerome's friend, brought Jovinian's book to the notice of Pope Siricius and it was shortly afterwards condemned in synods at that city and at Milan about 390 CE.

He subsequently sent Jovinian's books to Jerome, who answered them in the present treatise in 393. Little is known of Jovinian, but it has been conjectured from Jerome's remark in the treatise against Vigilantius, where Jovinian is said to have "amidst pheasants and pork rather belched out than breathed out his life," and by a kind of transmigration to have transmitted his opinions into Vigilantius, that he had died before 409, the date of that work.

== Outline of Against Jovinian ==
The first book is wholly on the first proposition of Jovinian, that relating to marriage and virginity. The first three chapters are introductory. The rest may be divided into three parts:

- Chapters 4–13 - An exposition, in Jerome's sense, of St. Paul's teaching in I Cor. 7.
- Chapters 14–39 - A statement of the teaching which Jerome derives from the various books of both the Old and the New Testaments.
- A denunciation of Jovinian (chapter 40), praise of virginity, and critique of marriage as a source of worldly distraction.
