= Sarmatio =

Sarmatio was a 4th-century monk in Milan and a disciple of Jovinian, who disputed the merits of the monastic and unmarried life. Sarmatio first met Jovinian when he travelled to Milan, where Jovinian found two monks of a similar mind, Sarmatio and Barbatianus. After Jovinian was expelled from Milan, Sarmatio kept doing work in Vercellae where he gathered a considerable following and public support; in response, Ambrose, the bishop of Milan, started defending ascetism. The views Sarmatio was preaching were condemned in the Synod of Milan.

Ambrose called Sarmatio and Barbatinus "foolish talkers, who say there is no merit in abstinence".

== See also ==
- Against Jovinianus
- Perpetual virginity of Mary
