= De bono coniugali =

De bono coniugali (The Good of Marriage) is a treatise by Augustine of Hippo, written approximately 401 AD. It was the first systematic treatise on marriage.

== Background ==
Agustine began working on De Bono Coniugali primarily to respond to the ideas of a Roman monk, Jovinian., however the work was also meant to rebut the claims of Jerome and the Manicheans on the same issue.

Jovinian was the most explicit target of the work, written to answer firstly the thesis that marriage and virginity, according to the monk, should be placed on the same level for five fundamental reasons:

- There is no difference, regarding perfection of the soul, between widowhood, marriage, and virginity.
- Once a Christian is baptized, the Evil One cannot overcome him: if the Christian sins, they can repent and restore harmony with God.
- The mortification of the flesh does not render the soul more holy than gratitude to the Lord only does.
- On Judgement Day there will not be any distinction in the rewards given.
- Mary conceived Christ virginally but lost her virginity in giving birth to him.

The writing of Jovinian was branded "reckless writing" (conscriptio temeraria) in 392 or 393 AD and the monk fled to Milan, where his writing was condemned at a council presided over by Ambrose as "horrible writing" (conscriptio horrifica).

Nevertheless, the ideas of Jovinian gained some support, to the extent that a group of prominent Christians in the capital, concerned that the opinion of the monk would catch on further, wrote to Jerome, asking him to weigh in on the matter. This resulted in the treatise Adversus Iovinianum, written in 393/4 AD, in which Jerome stresses the superiority of virginity over marriage and paints a rather negative image of married life, to the point that in Rome his friends were surprised by the tone of the pamphlet, which turned out to be counterproductive. For this reason, in De Bono Coniugali, although it was clear that his direct target was Jovinian, Augustine tried to also implicitly divert the resentment Jerome unleashed by his denigration of marriage in the secular and married spheres, proposing, in fact, an intermediate position between the ideas of Jovinian and Jerome.

De Bono Coniugali is, moreover, also a reaction to the Manichean ideas of marriage. Augustine himself was a Manichean for about 10 years, from 374 AD until his arrival in Milan and his conversion. The Manichean sect held to the dualism of Good and Evil, incarnated respectively as God and Satan. This dualism was reflected, in the sphere of human carnality, in the soul and the body. Sensuality was considered by them to be a weapon forged by Satan to defeat Good, and all believers were therefore required to preserve their virginity and flee fleshly desire. No only this, but also procreation was a work of Evil. For this reason they held very critical positions towards the Patriarchs of the Old Testament, who were examples, according to them, of polygamy and immoderation. Augustine in De Bono Coniugali, forcefully rebutted this last point, justifying the conduct of the Patriarchs as absolutely necessary for the production of the descendants who would lead ultimately to the lineage of Christ and of Christians..

== Influences ==
Augustine, in the writing of De Bono Coniugali, relied primarily on Paul of Tarsus and on exegetes like Cyprian, Tertullian, and Ambrose. Augustine had to rely on these sources, even though many earlier Greek Fathers had already interpreted the scriptures regarding marriage and virginity, because Augustine did not read Greek fluently at the time he wrote the treatise.

=== Paul of Tarsus ===
The passage from Paul that permeates De Bono Coniugali more than any other is the following:

3 The husband should fulfill his marital duty to his wife, and likewise the wife to her husband. 4 The wife does not have authority over her own body, but the husband. Likewise the husband does not have authority over his own body, but the wife.

5 Do not deprive each other, except by mutual consent and for a time, so you may devote yourselves to prayer. Then come together again, so that Satan will not tempt you through your lack of self-control. 6 I say this as a concession, not as a command. 7 I wish that all men were as I am. But each man has his own gift from God; one has this gift, another has that.

8 Now to the unmarried and widows I say this: It is good for them to remain unmarried, as I am. 9 But if they cannot control themselves, let them marry. For it is better to marry than to burn with passion.

10 To the married I give this command (not I, but the Lord): A wife must not separate from her husband. 11 But if she does, she must remain unmarried or else be reconciled to her husband. And a husband must not divorce his wife.

— I Corinthians 7:3 BSB

From this passage, Augustine extrapolates in particular the theory that it is better to marry and commit sins of intemperance than to commit them while unmarried and the idea, further developed by the Cathaginian philosopher, according to which neither the man nor the woman has the right to disown a marriage, because, as long as their respective spouse remains alive, the couple is joined in a way that is indissolvable.

=== Tertullian ===
From Tertullian, Augustine adopts two reflections. The first, that Tertullian, in supporting severe asceticism and vehemently promoting virginity over marriage, which he counsels instead to those who are not able to practice moderation, expressed toward married life, was responding to the criticisms of the heretic Marcion and that he can be summed up in the conceit, present in Adversus Marcionem, that he pursues, exalts, and seeks purity without condemning marriage; that is, as argued in De Bono Coniugali, just because one thing is preferable, it doesn't follow that the rest is condemned.

In fact, although for Augustine a life of abstinence is better than marriage, that institution should not be completely belittled, since it is necessary to transform lust, irrepressible for some of the faithful, into "labor" for procreation, rendering it functional for paternity and not for the sexual act in itself.

The consequence of this is that, according to Augustine, while any sexual act that is not turned towards procreation is evil, nonetheless in marriage immoderation is pardoned, provided that it remains within the confines of marriage, which is good.

The second reflection of Tertullian, present in De Monogamia and discernible in the work of Augustine, is that which concerns the importance of marriage for the propagation of Christian descendants, which is considered by the bishop of Hippo, from a "practical" perspective, the continuation of the Christian lineage.

== Contents ==
Agustine began the treatise by considering marriage from a philosophical point of view, as the natural basis of social bonds and as the perpetuation of the lineage of Christianity. He identified three fundamental benefits of marriage: procreation, faithfulness, and sacrament. Procreation is the first fundamental benefit of the married life, or faithful companionship, if the spouses are unable to have children.

He speculates that Adam and Eve, since they were equipped with physical bodies, could have had offspring while still in Eden, therefore the original divine purpose was probably, in marriage, to allow the generation of offspring. Augustine insists on faithfulness, which limits sexual relations to partners in a couple. He contrasts this with casual and opportunistic relations, adultery, and fornication. Marriage prevents illicit sexual relations, because even licentious acts are pardonable if they occur within the bounds of marriage (in this Augustine implicitly refutes the stance of Jerome that a member of a couple could commit adulterous acts even within a marriage).

Augustine then compares marriage with widowhood and virginity. He insists that an activity can be good even though others are better and that some actions are good not inherently but due to their purpose. Sexual acts, which have the purpose of procreation, are good, while a sexual act as an end in itself is to be condemned. He defends the Patriarchs from the accusations of the Manicheans, asserting that for the Patriarchs intense sexual activity was necessary to give life to the lineage of Christ and of Christianity. Augustine argues that once there is a large community of Christians, only those who are intemperate should marry, so as to make acceptable, within the sacred institution of marriage, their licentious behavior.

Augustine goes on to distinguish between Christian marriage and secular marriage, identifying the first as a sacrament, a bond that transcends human mortality, so sacred that it could not be broken in any way. Also in the case where a marriage is disowned, any subsequent act with another person would be considered adultery, even if a man had disowned an adulteress or if his wife was unable to bear him children, in contrast to what was had been happening in the Roman world.
