= Perpetual virginity of Mary =

Marian dogma

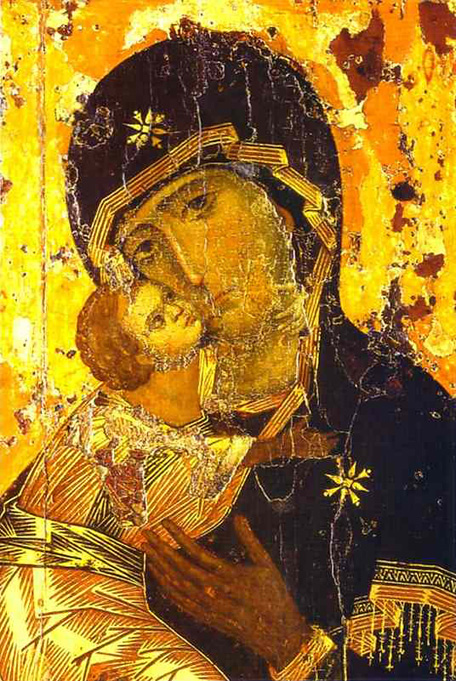
The Vladimir Eleusa icon of the Ever Virgin Mary — the Aeiparthenos (Ever Virgin) title is widely used in Orthodox liturgy, and icons show her with three stars, on her shoulders and forehead, symbolising her threefold virginity (12th century)

The perpetual virginity of Mary is a Christian doctrine that Mary, the mother of Jesus, was a virgin "before, during and after" the birth of Christ. In Western Christianity, the Catholic Church adheres to the doctrine, as do many Anglicans, some Lutherans, Reformed, and other Protestants. In Eastern Christianity, the Oriental Orthodox Churches and the Church of the East both adhere to this doctrine as part of their ongoing tradition, and Eastern Orthodox churches recognize Mary as Aeiparthenos, meaning "ever-virgin". It is one of the four Marian dogmas of the Catholic Church. Most modern nonconformist Protestants, together with many nondenominational Christians, reject the doctrine.

The extant written tradition of the perpetual virginity of Mary first appears in a late 2nd-century text called the Protoevangelium of James. The Second Council of Constantinople in 553 gave her the title "Aeiparthenos", meaning Perpetual Virgin, and at the Lateran Synod of 649 Pope Martin I emphasized the threefold character of the perpetual virginity, before, during, and after the birth of Christ. The Lutheran Smalcald Articles (1537) and the Reformed Second Helvetic Confession (1562) codified the doctrine of perpetual virginity of Mary as well.

The doctrine of Mary's perpetual virginity has been challenged on the basis that the New Testament stipulates that Joseph did not have sexual intercourse with Mary until after the birth of Jesus, and mentions the brothers (adelphoi) of Jesus, who may have been:

- sons of Mary, the mother of Jesus, and Joseph
- sons of Joseph by a former marriage, or
- sons of the Mary named in Mark 15:40 as "mother of James and Joses", who has been identified as either the wife of Clopas and sister of Mary, the mother of Jesus, or a sister-in-law to Joseph (Note: According to Hegesippus, Clopas is Joseph's brother, therefore Mary, wife of Clopas, would be Joseph's sister-in-law.)

== Origin and history ==
=== 1st century ===
Early Christian writings from the late first and early second centuries offer only sparse and sometimes unclear hints about virginity and celibacy, and in the Gospels Mary’s virginity is mentioned only briefly, in a way that keeps the focus on the virginal conception rather than on any later state of her life.

The infancy narratives in Matthew and Luke present Mary as a virgin at the time she conceives Jesus, a conception that does not involve sexual relations with a man, but this fact by itself does not require the further claim that she remained a virgin in childbirth or afterward.

Only in later doctrinal reflection do Christians explicitly describe Mary as virgin before, during, and after the birth of Christ, with the second-century Protevangelium of James providing the earliest surviving text that clearly supports this view. The increasing acceptance of Mary’s perpetual virginity, together with theological formulations shaped by the text, came to serve as a marker of emerging ascetic tendencies in later centuries.

The Odes of Solomon have been interpreted as implying that Mary was a virgin even during childbirth as well as stating that Mary did not have pain during childbirth. Similar statements exist in the Ascension of Isaiah; for example, the passage "And after her astonishment had worn off her womb was found as (it was) at first, before she had conceived" is described by scholars as an "extraordinary process".

=== 2nd century ===
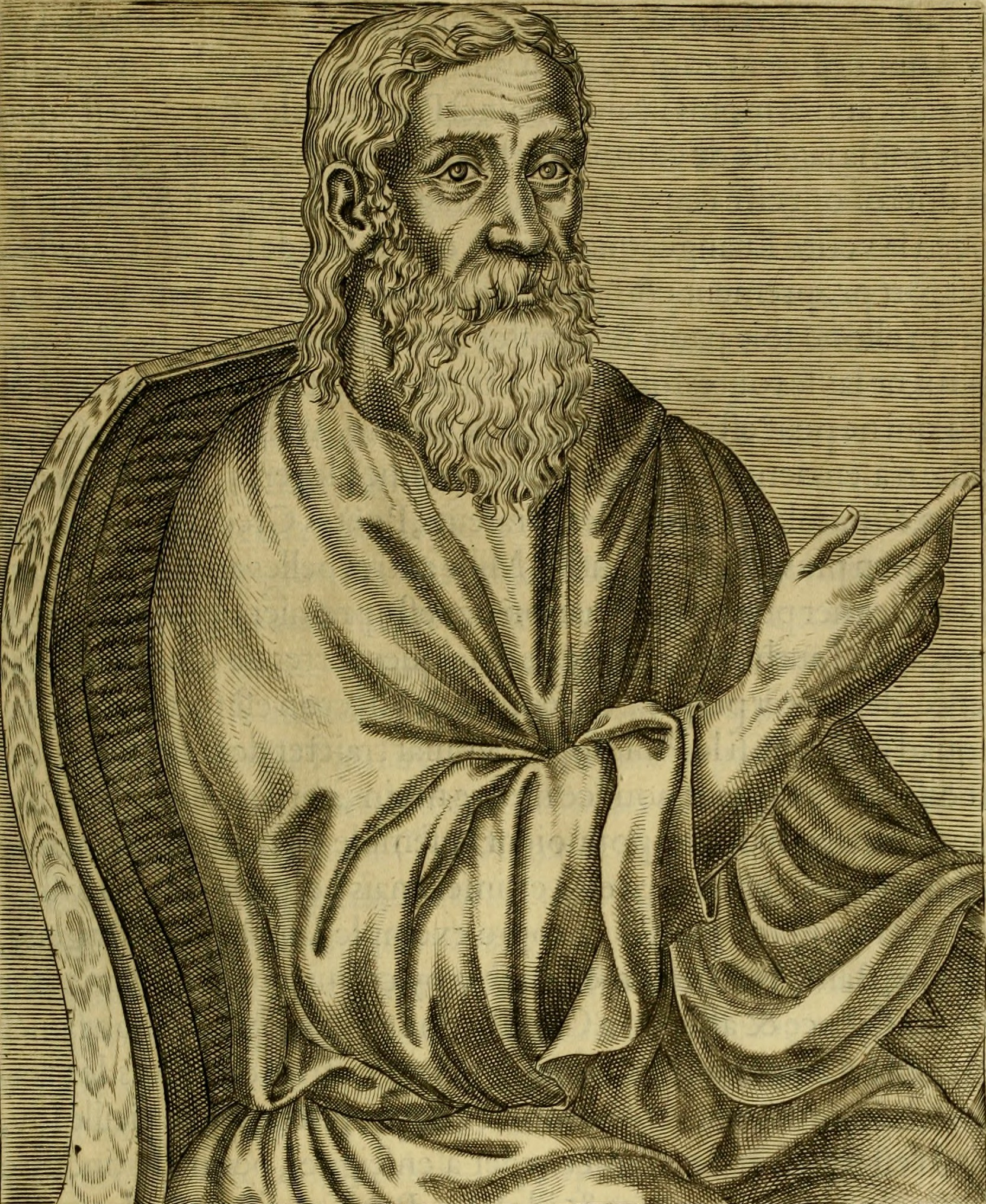
Clement of Alexandria (150–215 AD) was an early proponent of the perpetual virginity of Mary.

The virgin birth of Jesus is found in the Gospel of Matthew and possibly in Luke, but it seems to have little theological importance before the middle of the 2nd century.

Church fathers Irenaeus and Justin Martyr, though mentioning the virgin birth, nowhere affirmed explicitly the view that Mary was a perpetual virgin. This idea, however, appears in at least three works: the Gospel of James, the Gospel of Peter and the Infancy Gospel of Thomas. All of these early sources independently assert that the so-called "brothers of the Lord" were children of Joseph's first marriage.

According to Anglican scholar Richard Bauckham, these works "show no signs of literary relationship" and probably "evidence of a well-established tradition in (probably early) second-century Syrian Christianity that Jesus' brothers and sisters were children of Joseph by a previous marriage". According to Bauckham, Ignatius of Antioch also believed in the doctrine of Mary's virginity during birth.

The Gospel of James states that Mary remained a life-long virgin, because Joseph was an old man who married her without physical desire, and the brothers of Jesus mentioned in the canonical gospels are explained as Joseph's sons by an earlier marriage.

The Gospel of James seems to have been used to create the stories of Mary which are found in the Quran, but while Muslims agree with Christians that Mary was a virgin at the moment of the conception of Jesus, the idea of her perpetual virginity thereafter is contrary to the Islamic ideal of women as wives and mothers.

The Second Apocalypse of James portrays James, not as a child of Joseph but of a certain "Theudas", a relative of Jesus.

The 8th book of the Christian Sibylline Oracles, which may have been composed in the late 2nd or early 3rd century, describe Mary as "always virgin" (αἰεὶ κούρῃ) and that she received God in her "intact bosom" (ἀχράντοισι ... κόλποις).

Hegesippus's writings are not clear on this subject, with some authors arguing that he defended the doctrine, while others arguing that he disputed the perpetual virginity of Mary.

The Ebionites denied the virgin birth and Mary's perpetual virginity.

=== 3rd century ===
Clement of Alexandria is counted among the early Greek Fathers who held that Jesus' brothers were the children of Joseph by a previous marriage, a view Schaff describes as "the general opinion of the early Greek Fathers" and "best attested by ecclesiastical tradition". Luigi Gambero presents Clement as explicitly witnessing to the Church’s faith in Mary’s perpetual virginity, including the report that Mary was examined by a midwife after the birth and found to be a virgin, and he cites Clement’s claim that "These things are attested to by the Scriptures of the Lord." Hunter adds that, although the Protevangelium of James is first mentioned by Clement of Alexandria, Clement "does not pursue any of its themes".

Origen used the Protoevangelium's explanation of the brothers to uphold the perpetual virginity of Mary ("There is no child of Mary except Jesus, according to those who think correctly about her"). Origen also mentioned that the Gospel of Peter affirmed the perpetual virginity of Mary, saying that the "brothers" of Jesus were from a previous marriage of Joseph.

Tertullian, who came between Clement and Origen, denied Mary's virginity during birth to refute the docetist idea that the Son of God could not have assumed a human body, stating: "although she was a virgin when she conceived, she was a wife when she brought forth her son". However, is not entirely clear on the issue of Mary's virginity after childbirth, with some scholars denying his traditional association with Helvidius's position.

Helvidius argued that Victorinus believed that Mary had other children. According to Jerome Helvidius was misinterpreting Victorinus. Epiphanius invented a name "Antidicomarians" for a group of people who denied the perpetual virginity of Mary, which Epiphanius attacked. Their same views were also mentioned earlier by Origen, although he too rejected them as heretical. They were active from the 3rd to the 5th century.

According to Epiphanius the Antidicomarians claimed that Apollinaris of Laodicea or his disciples denied the perpetual virginity of Mary, though Epiphanius doubted the claim.

Eusebius (260/265–339/340) and Epiphanius (c. 310/320–403) defended the perpetual virginity of Mary.

Hippolytus of Rome (170–235) held that Mary was "ever-virgin".

=== 4th century ===
By the early 4th century the spread of monasticism had promoted celibacy as the ideal state, and a moral hierarchy was established with marriage occupying the third rank below life-long virginity and widowhood. Eastern theologians generally accepted Mary as Ever-virgin (Aeiparthenos), but many in the Western church were less convinced.

Helvidius objected to the devaluation of marriage inherent in this view and argued that the two states, of virginity and marriage, were equal. His contemporary Jerome, realising that this would lead to the Mother of God occupying a lower place in heaven than virgins and widows, defended her perpetual virginity in his immensely influential Against Helvidius, issued c.383.

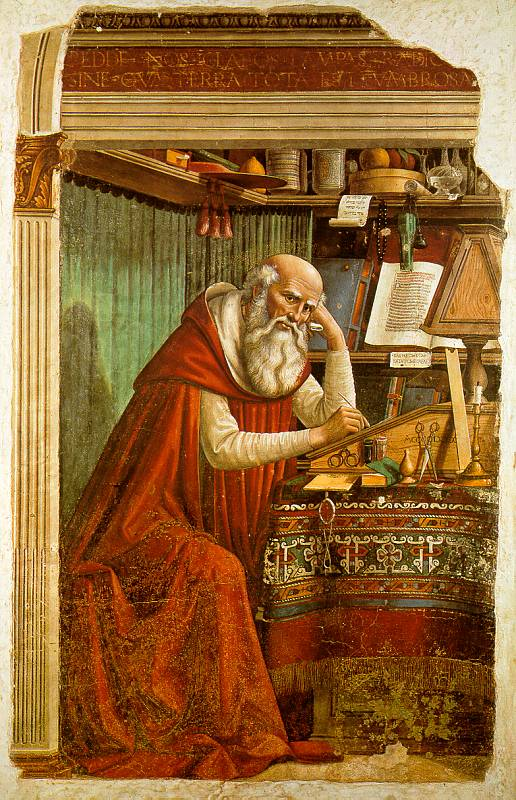
Jerome defended the perpetual virginity of Mary against Helvidius.

In the 380s and 390s the monk Jovinian denied Mary's virginity during childbirth, writing that if Jesus did not undergo a normal human birth, then his body was something other than a truly human one. As reported by Augustine, Jovinian "denied that the virginity of Mary, which existed when she conceived, remained while she gave birth." Augustine goes on to say that the reason for Jovinian's denial of Mary's virginity was that the doctrine was too close to the Manichean view that Christ was simply a phantom. According to Ambrose, Jovinian maintained that Mary had conceived as a virgin, but she had not given birth as a virgin. Jerome wrote against Jovinian but failed to mention this aspect of his teaching, and most commentators believe that he did not find it offensive. Jovinian also found two monks in Milan, Sarmatio and Barbatian, who held similar views as Jovinian.

Ambrose, Archbishop of Milan, was a prominent defender of Mary's virginity in partu and became a principal target of contemporary accusations of Manicheism. In 391, in his treatise Concerning Virginity, he argued that both the physical birth of Jesus from Mary and the baptismal rebirth of Christians from the Church had to be wholly virginal, including during birth, in order to remove the stain of original sin, of which the pains of childbirth were, in his view, the bodily sign. It was due to Ambrose that virginitas in partu came to be included consistently in the thinking of subsequent theologians.

Bonosus of Sardica also denied the perpetual virginity of Mary, for which he was declared a heretic. His followers would survive for many centuries, especially among the Goths. Additionally, the perpetual virginity of Mary was denied by some Arians.

Jovinian was condemned as a heretic at a Synod of Milan under Ambrose's presidency in 390 and Mary's perpetual virginity was established as the only orthodox view. Further developments were to follow when the Second Council of Constantinople in 553 formally gave her the title Aeiparthenos, and at the Lateran Synod of 649 Pope Martin I emphasised the threefold character of the perpetual virginity, before, during, and after the birth of Christ.

Athanasius of Alexandria (d. 393) declared Mary Aeiparthenos, and the liturgy of James the brother of Jesus likewise required a declaration of Mary as ever-virgin. This view was defended by Augustine, Hilary of Poitiers, Didymus the Blind, among others.

The Apostles' Creed taught the doctrine of virginitas in partu.

=== Middle Ages ===
In the Middle Ages the perpetual virginity of Mary was commonly accepted, however the Paulicians denied her perpetual virginity, even saying that Christ denied her to be blessed.

=== Protestant Reformation ===
The Protestant Reformation saw a rejection of the special moral status of lifelong celibacy. As a result, marriage and parenthood were extolled, and Mary and Joseph were seen as a normal married couple. It also affirmed the Bible alone as the fundamental source of authority regarding God's word (sola scriptura).

Mary's perpetual virginity was upheld by Martin Luther (who names her ever-virgin in the Smalcald Articles, a Lutheran confession of faith written in 1537), Huldrych Zwingli, Thomas Cranmer, Wollebius, Bullinger, John Wycliffe and later Protestant leaders including John Wesley, the co-founder of Methodism.

In the Evangelical Lutheran faith, in addition to being taught in the Smalcald Articles, the Formula of Concord upholds the perpetual virginity of Mary. The Lutheran divine Melanchthon lambasted Osiander for his denial of the perpetual virginity of Mary. As such, many Lutheran divines have taught the perpetual virginity of Mary.

With respect to the Reformed tradition (Continental Reformed, Presbyterian, Reformed Anglican and Congregationalist denominations), John Calvin's view was more ambiguous, believing that knowing what happened to Mary after the birth of Jesus is impossible. However John Calvin argued that Matthew 1:25, used by Helvidius to attack the perpetual virginity of Mary does not teach that Mary had other children. Other Calvinists affirmed Mary's perpetual virginity, including within the Second Helvetic Confession—stating that Mary was the "ever virgin Mary"—and in the notes of the Geneva Bible. Theodore Beza, a prominent early Calvinist, included the perpetual virginity of Mary in a list of agreements between Calvinism and the Catholic Church. Some reformers upheld the doctrine to counter more radical reformers who questioned the divinity of Christ; Mary's perpetual virginity guaranteed the Incarnation of Christ despite the challenges to its scriptural foundations. Modern nonconformist Protestants, such as the Plymouth Brethren, have largely rejected the perpetual virginity of Mary on the basis of sola scriptura, and it has rarely appeared explicitly in confessions or doctrinal statements, though the perpetual virginity of Mary remains a common belief in Lutheranism and Anglicanism.

Among the Anabaptists, Hubmaier never abandoned his belief in the perpetual virginity of Mary and continued to esteem Mary as theotokos ("mother of God"). These two doctrinal stances are addressed individually in Articles Nine and Ten, respectively, of Hubmaier's work, Apologia.

== Doctrine ==
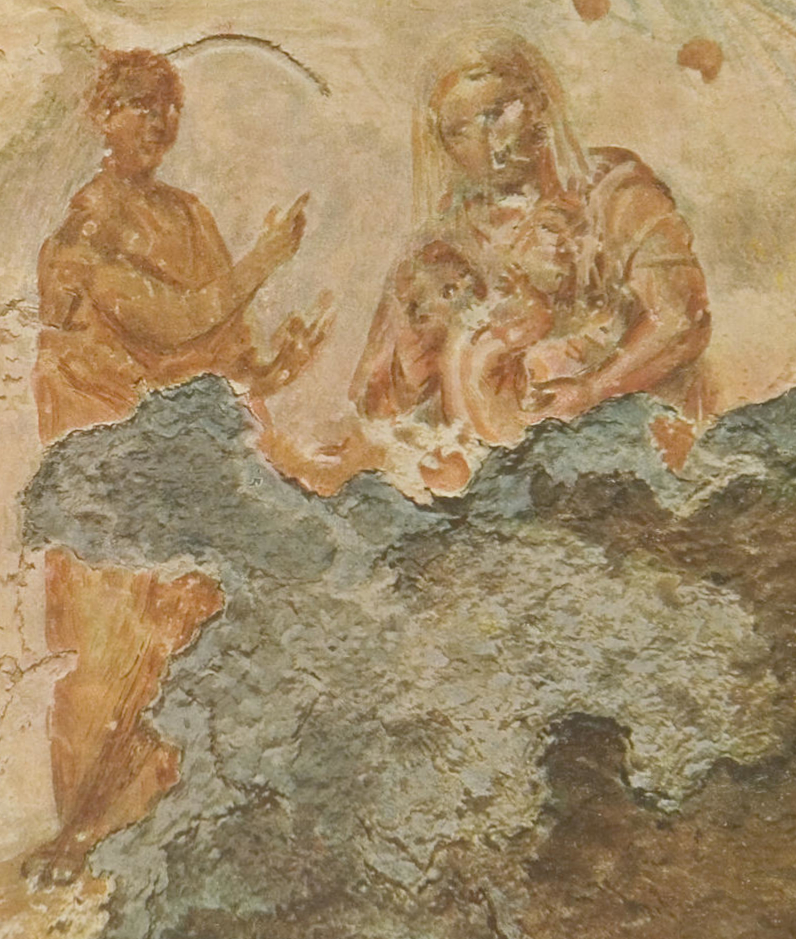
Isaiah (left) predicts the birth of the Messiah from the Virgin. Mary is shown nursing the Infant Jesus. Circa 100-150 A.D., Catacomb of Priscilla, Rome.

The Second Council of Constantinople recognized Mary as Aeiparthenos, meaning "ever-virgin". It remains axiomatic for the Eastern Orthodox Church that she remained virginal throughout her Earthly life, and Orthodoxy therefore understands the New Testament references to the brothers and sisters of Jesus as signifying his kin, but not the biological children of his mother.

The Latin Church, known more commonly today as the Catholic Church, shared the Council of Constantinople with the theologians of the Greek or Orthodox communion, and therefore shares with them the title Aeiparthenos as accorded to Mary. The Catholic Church has gone further than the Orthodox in making the Perpetual Virginity one of the four Marian dogmas, meaning that it is held to be a truth divinely revealed, the denial of which is heresy. It declares her virginity before, during and after the birth of Jesus, or in the definition formulated by Pope Martin I at the Lateran Council of 649:

The blessed ever-virginal and immaculate Mary conceived, without seed, by the Holy Spirit, and without loss of integrity brought him forth, and after his birth preserved her virginity inviolate.

Thomas Aquinas admitted that reason could not prove this, but argued that it must be accepted because it was "fitting", for as Jesus was the only-begotten son of God, so he should also be the only-begotten son of Mary, as a second and purely human conception would disrespect the sacred state of her holy womb. Symbolically, the perpetual virginity of Mary signifies a new creation and a fresh start in salvation history. It has been stated and argued repeatedly, most recently by the Second Vatican Council:

This union of the mother with the Son in the work of salvation is made manifest from the time of Christ's virginal conception [...] then also at the birth of Our Lord, who did not diminish his mother's virginal integrity but sanctified it...

— Lumen Gentium, No.57

== Arguments and evidence ==
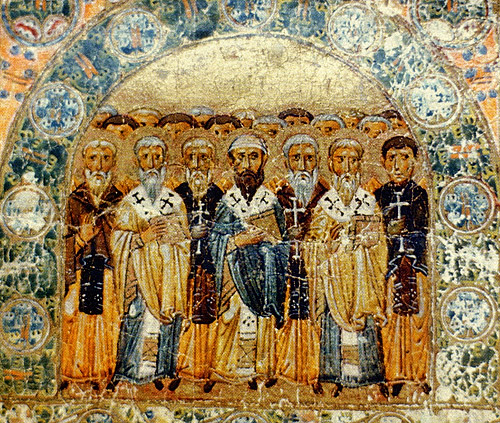
The Church Fathers in an 11th-century depiction from Kiev

A problem facing theologians wishing to maintain Mary's life-long virginity is that the Pauline epistles, the four gospels, and the Acts of the Apostles all mention the brothers (adelphoi) of Jesus; both Matthew and Mark record their names and add unnamed sisters. (Note: Mark 6:3 has James, Joses [an abbreviated form of Joseph], Judas, and Simon, with unnamed sisters; Matthew 13:55–56 has James, Joseph, Simon, and Judas, with unnamed sisters; Matthew 12:46, Luke 8:19, John 7:3–10, and Acts 1:14 all mention brothers also. See Bauckham (2015) in bibliography, pages 6–9.) The Gospel of James, followed a century later by Epiphanius, explained the adelphoi as Joseph's children by an earlier marriage, which is still the view of the Eastern Orthodox Christian churches. Jerome, believing that Joseph, like Mary, must be a life-long virgin, argued that these adelphoi were the sons of "Mary, the mother of James and Joses" (Mark 15:40), who he identified with the wife of Clopas and sister of the virgin Mary (John 19:25), which remains popular in the Western church. A modern proposal considers these adelphoi sons of "Mary, the mother of James and Joses" (not here identified with the Virgin Mary's sister), and Clopas, who according to Hegesippus was Joseph's brother.

Further scriptural difficulties were added by Luke 2:7, which calls Jesus the "first-born" son of Mary, and Matthew 1:25, which adds that Joseph "did not know her until she had brought forth her firstborn son." The phrase "did not know her" is a euphemism for sexual relations. Most scholars argue the grammar of Matthew 1:25 neither confirms nor denies the perpetual virginity of Mary. However, other scholars challenge this claim, especially in light of discoveries in modern linguistics.

Helvidius argued that first-born implies later births, and that the word "until" left open the way to sexual relations after the birth; Jerome, replying that even an only son will be a first-born and that "until" did not have the meaning Helvidius construed for it, told a repulsive word-portrait of Joseph having intercourse with a blood-stained and exhausted Mary immediately after she has given birth—the implication, in his view, of Helvidius's arguments. Opinions on the quality of Jerome's rebuttal range from the view that it was masterful and well-argued to thin, rhetorical and sometimes tasteless.

Two other 4th century Fathers, Gregory of Nyssa, following "a certain apocryphal account", and Augustine, advanced a further argument by reading Luke 1:34 as a vow of perpetual virginity on Mary's part; this idea, first introduced in the Protoevangelium of James, has little scholarly support today, but it and the arguments advanced by Jerome and Ambrose were put forward by Pope John Paul II in his catechesis of August 28, 1996, as the four facts supporting the Catholic Church's ongoing faith in Mary's perpetual virginity.

It has been argued from John 19, where Jesus entrusts Mary to the disciple John instead of his brothers, to support the view that Jesus had no brothers, however Protestants have generally argued in two ways against this passage, one by claiming that the brothers of Jesus were unbelievers or that they were not present during the crucifixion. This interpretation is generally rejected by Catholic and Orthodox writers, emphasising that even if non believers, Jewish customs still required the eldest son to take responsibility for his mother.

Some have argued that Mary and Joseph could not have had a normal marriage if Mary remained a perpetual virgin; however, it has been argued by some Catholics that there is evidence that celibacy within marriage was already practiced by the Qumran community and other Jews at that time.

Catholic priest and New Testament scholar John P. Meier argues that even though the absolute state of the evidence is not conclusive enough to disprove the perpetual virginity of Mary, the preponderance of evidence shows that the authors of the Gospels intended for the siblings of Jesus to be blood relatives.

== See also ==
- Anglican Marian theology
- Antidicomarians
- Assumption of Mary
- Brothers of Jesus
- Catholic Mariology
- Immaculate Conception
- Lutheran Mariology
- New Eve
- Panachranta (icon)
- Virgin birth of Jesus
