= K. C. Paul =

Indian science denier

Kartik Chandra Paul
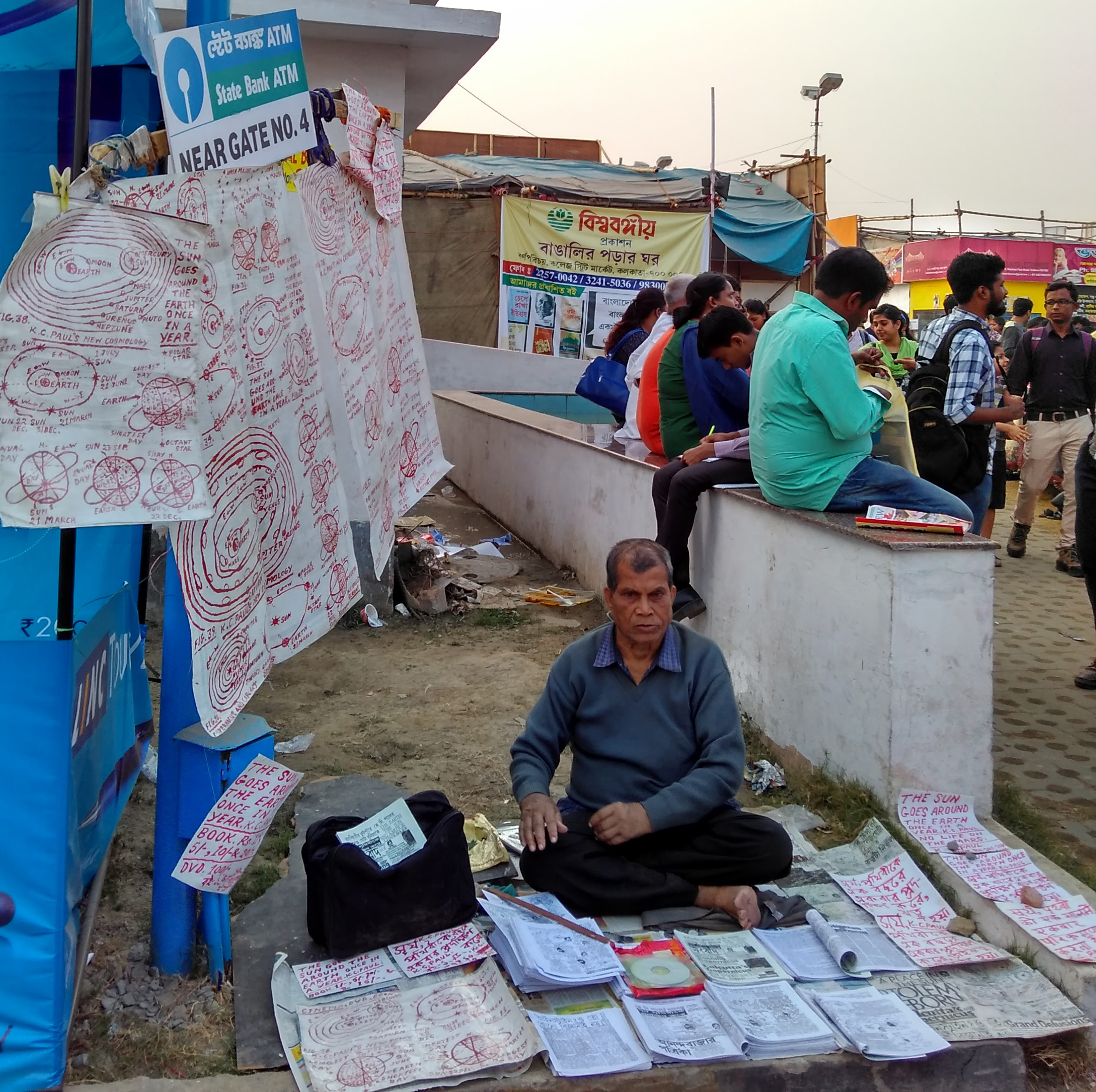
- Paul in 2016 at Kolkata International Book Fair
- Born: Kartik Chandra Paul; 1942 (age 83–84); Anulia, Howrah, Bengal Presidency, British India
- Occupations: Constable in Indian Army; Employee at West Bengal State Electricity Board. WBSEDCL formerly known as West Bengal State Electricity Board
- Known for: Proponent of Geocentric Astronomy

Kartik Chandra Paul (born 1942) is an Indian conspiracy theorist and self-proclaimed scientist and astronomer who has for almost the last forty years, been trying to prove that the Sun revolves around the Earth and not vice versa.

== Early life ==
Paul was born in 1942 in the Anuliya village of Amta of Howrah. Though he was admitted to a local school, he could not continue his studies due to financial trouble.

== Military service ==
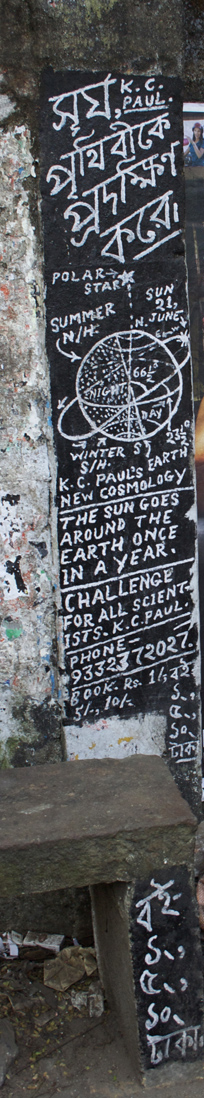
Paul's one graffiti, propagating his theory.

Paul is an exponent of Geocentric model.

During the Sino-Indian War of 1962, he joined the Indian Army as a constable. Initially, he was posted at Fatehgarh of Uttar Pradesh. Then, he was transferred to Rajputana regiment. He served there for 15 years.

During this time, the concept that the Sun revolved around the Earth came to his mind. He started studying and performing experiments. In 1974 he became assured that the conventional Heliocentrism theory is incorrect and in actuality the Sun revolves around the Earth.

He wrote a thesis, self-published it and started publicising his concept. A Hindi newspaper Amar Ujala took his interview and published it. According to Indian Army regulations, one can not give an interview without having prior permission. Paul was show-caused when he gave interviews to few other newspapers. Generally service is automatically terminated if the accused person does not reply within 30 days. Paul did not respond to the show-cause and he was terminated from the Indian Army.

== Life with Geocentric concept ==
Paul returned to his house in 1979 and took up the profession of a book seller. He started selling his own books. In 1980 he got a job in the West Bengal State Electricity Service, which he retired from in 2005. At that time, he received ₹500,000 (US$5,200). He decided to spend a large portion of this money to publicise his geocentric concept.

The 24th KIFF honoured him by making a movie on him, named Surjo Prithibir Chardike Ghore (Sun Goes Around the Earth) directed by Arijit Biswas. According to the news article of Ei Samay Sangbadpatra published of 11 November 2018, the film concentrates more on the strong belief of K.C. Paul and his character rather than his concept. Paul's name in the film is T. C. Paul. K. C. Paul has promised to hand leaflets to all his audience and lecture on his geocentric concept.

== Personal life ==
Paul was married and has four children.

== Current status ==
As of 18 August 2013, according to a news article published in Anandabazar Patrika, Paul has lost possession of his house, and is living on the footpaths of Kolkata. He is also not getting his pensions regularly and his income is hardly ₹500 (US$5.20) per month or ₹17 (18¢ US) per day. As of 11 November 2018, according to a news article published in Ei Samay Sangbadpatra, Paul has shifted back to his house after a stay of 2 and a half years on the footpaths of Kolkata. He is still very interested to publicise his theory and works as he worked when he was on footpaths.

Recently a documentary called The Geocentric Man is said to be launched by Svf Hoichoi based on his life and work.

== See also ==
- Robert Sungenis, an American who also promotes geocentrism
- Modern flat Earth beliefs
