= Barbatianus =

4th-century early Church theologian and Jovinianist

Barbatinus was a 4th-century early Church theologian and a Jovinianist. Barbatianus disputed the merit of the unmarried life and opposed ascetism. Barbatianus along with Sarmatio met Jovinian when he travelled to Milan and found themselves to have similar ideas.

Ambrose wrote about Barbatianus, saying that he came from the monastery of Milan, which was also Ambrose's own monastery. He accused Barbatianus of permitting fornication and asserting it not to be inferior to the state of virginity, calling Sarmatio and Barbatinus "foolish talkers, who say there is no merit in abstinence". He even wrote a letter urging the church at Vercelli to resist the ideas of Barbatianus, to influence the election of the episcopal see in Vercelli.
