= Helvidius =

4th century Roman theologian

Helvidius (sometimes Helvetius) was the author of a work written prior to 383 against the belief in the perpetual virginity of Mary. Helvidius maintained that the biblical mention of "sisters" and "brothers" of the Lord constitutes solid evidence that Mary had normal marital relations with Joseph and additional children after the miraculous conception and birth of Jesus. He supported his opinion by the writings of Tertullian and Victorinus. Helvidius is sometimes seen as an early proto-protestant, along with Vigiliantius, Jovinian and Aerius of Sebaste.

Jerome, in reply, wrote a treatise known under the title The Perpetual Virginity of Blessed Mary, where he vigorously takes the other side, and argues that the "sisters" and "brothers" spoken of were either step-brothers, children of Joseph by a former marriage (cf. Protoevangelium of James), or first cousins, children of Mary's relative/relation/kinswoman Elizabeth and siblings of John the Baptist. When Jerome wrote this treatise both he and Helvidius were in Rome, and Damasus was Bishop of Rome.

Helvidius also accused Jerome of translating the Vulgate from corrupt Greek manuscripts. All the works of Helvidius are lost; we know some things about his tract against the belief in the perpetual virginity of Mary only through Jerome's treatise written in response to it.

Helvidius considered the state of being married as an honor and argued against the high glorification of celibacy, which Jerome attacked. Helvidius is one of the early opponents of the monastic movement.

Jerome often insults Helvidius as a rough, uneducated man.

== See also ==
- Brothers of Jesus
- Antidicomarianites
- Bonosians
- Jovinian
