= Aerius of Sebaste =

4th-century presbyter

Aerius of Pontus (also Aërius, Aëris) was a 4th-century presbyter of Sebaste in Pontus. He taught doctrines that were in opposition to 4th-5th century Christian beliefs. His views are known from St Epiphanius's Panarion in which he was accused of being an Arian. For a short period, he had many followers in Sebaste. He failed to make his teachings widely popular and his sect died out soon after his death. Aerius of Sebaste is sometimes seen as an early proto-protestant, along with Jovinian, Helvidius and Vigiliantius.

== Life and teachings ==
Aerius was a priest and a friend and fellow ascetic of Eustathius of Sebaste. Eustathius became bishop of Sebaste in the year 355 and would later ordain Aerius and put him in charge of the hospital in Sebaste. Aerius fell out with Eustathius, due to the bishop having deserted ascetic practices. Aerius opposed superiority of bishops over priests. Aerius soon began to teach new doctrines, insisting that there was no sacred character distinguishing bishop or priest from laymen, that the observance of the feast of Easter was a Jewish superstition, and that it was wrong to prescribe fasts or abstinences by law, and useless to pray for the dead. His followers, known as Aerians, fasted on Sundays and would not do so on the appointed fast-days, even during Holy Week.

For a time, he had many followers in Sebaste, but he could not make his teachings widely popular. The Aerians, who followed his teachings, may have been Arians as well. Epiphanius of Salamis believed they were. In his best-known book Panarion, he attacked the Aerians and their founder. Written between 374 and 377, the work was a handbook for dealing with heretics. The author listed 80 heretical doctrines, some of which, like the teachings of Aerius, are not described in any other surviving documents from the time.

== Legacy ==
Some sources, including The Oxford Dictionary of the Christian Church, feel that Aerius received more attention than he was due from scholars such as St Robert Bellarmine and 17th century Anglican writers, "seeing how his sect died out soon after his death." His movement is considered important by some Protestants. However, extant evidence shows how strongly some Christians of his day were opposed to the teaching of Aerius.
