= The Principle =

2014 film

- Theatrical release poster
- Directed by: Katheryne Thomas
- Produced by: Rick DeLano; Robert Sungenis
- Narrated by: Kate Mulgrew
- Distributed by: Rocky Mountain Pictures
- Release date: October 24, 2014
- Running time: 90 minutes
- Country: United States
- Language: English
- Box office: $89,543 as of April 30, 2015

The Principle is a 2014 American independent film produced by Rick DeLano and Robert Sungenis. It rejects the Copernican principle and supports the long-superseded notion and pseudoscientific principle that Earth is at the center of the universe. The film is narrated by Kate Mulgrew and features scientists such as Lawrence M. Krauss and Michio Kaku. Mulgrew and scientists who were interviewed in the film have repudiated the ideas advocated in the film and stated that their involvement was the result of being misled by the filmmaker.

== Release ==
The film was released on October 24, 2014, when screened at the Marcus Addison Cinema in Addison, Illinois, according to the distributor Rocky Mountain Pictures. Box office receipts were $86,172.

== Complaints from featured actors and scientists ==
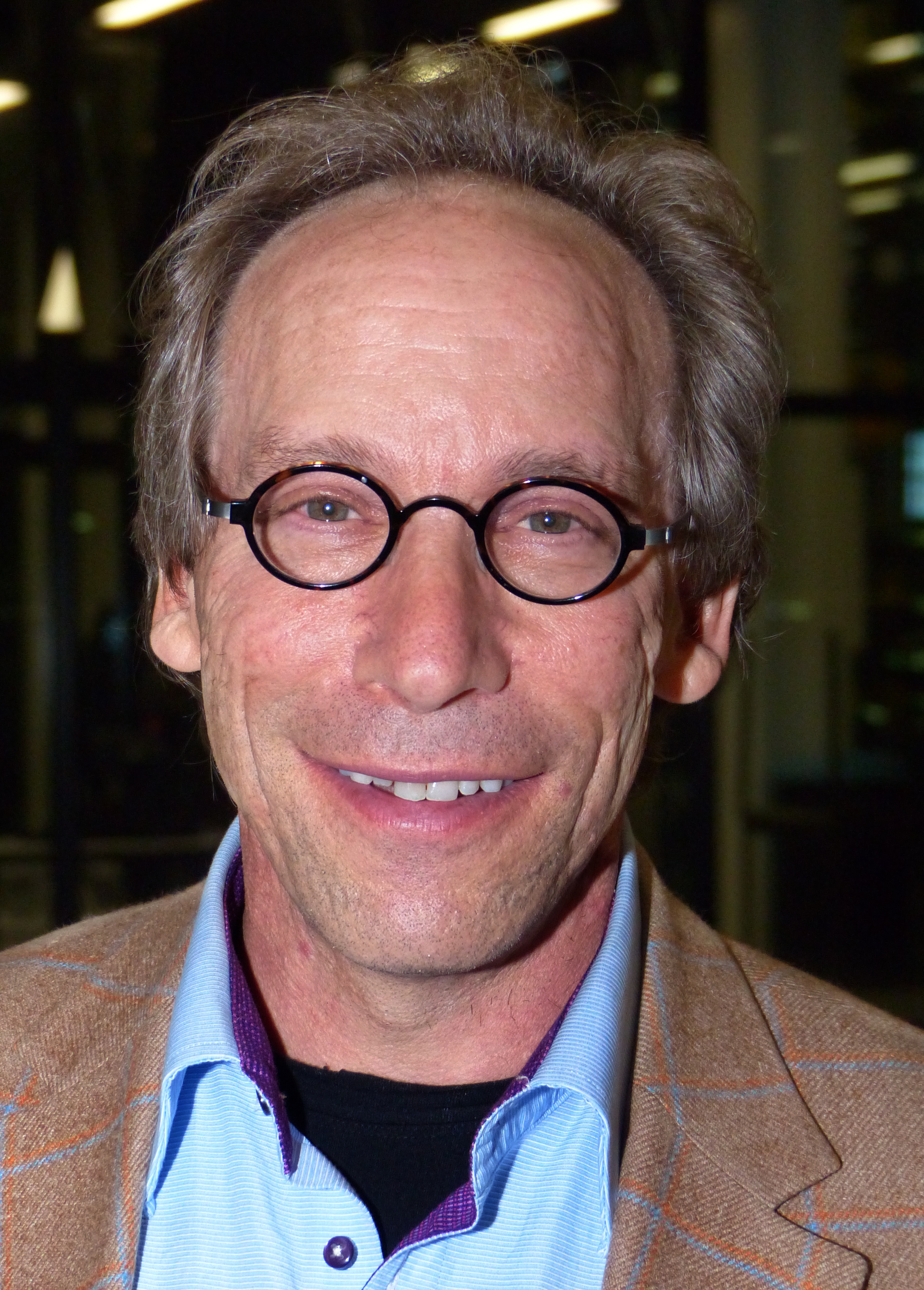
Physicist Lawrence Krauss was one of those interviewed in the film. He later wrote an article titled "I Have No Idea How I Ended Up In That Stupid Geocentrism Documentary."

The film was criticized by some of the interviewed physicists, who say they were misled into appearing in the film, claiming that the documentary makes an invalid philosophical assumption that defining physical relationships among objects in space, one way or another, necessarily must limit what one can say about the relationship between God and humanity in theology, and treats science as a belief system dealing with the same matters as religion. The movie rejects the scientific consensus that the Earth orbits the Sun, and distorts other aspects of the actual Copernican principle.

Following the release of the film's trailer, narrator Kate Mulgrew said that she was misinformed about the purpose of the documentary and that Sungenis' involvement, which would have been a dealbreaker had she been hitherto aware, was not disclosed to her. Max Tegmark explained that DeLano "cleverly tricked a whole bunch of us scientists into thinking that they were independent filmmakers doing an ordinary cosmology documentary, without mentioning anything about their hidden agenda." George Ellis corroborated. "I was interviewed for it but they did not disclose this agenda, which of course is nonsense. I don't think it's worth responding to — it just gives them publicity. To ignore is the best policy. But for the record, I totally disavow that silly agenda."

Michio Kaku said that the film was probably using "clever editing" of his statements and bordered on intellectual dishonesty, and Lawrence Krauss said he had no recollection of being interviewed for the film and would have refused to be in it if he had known more about it. British physicist Julian Barbour said that he never gave permission to be in the film.

The filmmakers responded to these allegations in a short documentary, Thought-Crime: The Conspiracy to Stop "The Principle".
