= Antidicomarians =

Christian sect active from the 3rd to the 5th century

The Antidicomarians or Antidicomarianites, also called Dimoerites, were a Christian sect active from the 3rd to the 5th century. Their name was invented by an opponent, Epiphanius of Salamis, who described them as heretical in his Panarion. The existence of the Antidicomarians as an organized sect may be doubted, as it is attested only in Epiphanius, but the doctrines he attributes to them were certainly matters of live debate in the late 4th century, and were condemned as heresy by prominent Christians such as St. Augustine of Hippo, and St. Ambrose of Milan.

The Antidicomarians refused to accord any special status to Mary, mother of Jesus, and rejected the doctrine of her perpetual virginity. Joseph they considered a widower with six children from a previous marriage. At first, they rejected the virgin birth and considered Joseph the father of Jesus. Later, they came to accept the virgin birth, but held that Joseph and Mary had normal sexual relations after Jesus' birth. They viewed the brothers of Jesus mentioned in the New Testament as Mary and Joseph's other children. The sect can be seen as a reaction to the rise of Marian devotion and celibacy. According to Epiphanius, the Antidicomarians attributed their position to Apollinaris of Laodicea. He wrote a letter defending the majority opinion about Mary to the Christians of Arabia, a copy of which he included in his Panarion.

The view that the brothers of Jesus were the children of Mary and Joseph was held independently of the Antidicomarian sect in the early church: Tertullian and Helvidius held it, while Origen mentions it. The Antidicomarian position on Mary became standard in Protestantism.

== See also ==
- Bonosus of Sardica, 4th-century theologian who rejected the perpetual virginity of Mary
- Collyridianism, a contemporary Arabian sect said to have worshipped Mary
