= Vigilantius =

Early 5th century Christian writer

Vigilantius (fl. c. 400) the Christian presbyter, wrote a work, no longer extant, which opposed a number of common 5th-century practices, and which inspired one of the most violent of the polemical treatises of Jerome (died 420). Vigilantius was born about 370 at Calagurris (current Saint Martory) in Aquitania, where his father kept an inn on the great Roman road from Gallia Aquitania to Spain. While still a youth his talent became known to Sulpicius Severus (c. 363 – c. 425), who had estates in that neighborhood, and in 395 Sulpicius, who probably baptized him, sent him with letters to Paulinus of Nola, where he met with a friendly reception. Some Protestant historians regard Vigilantius, along with Jovinian, Aerius of Sebaste and Helvidius, as 4th-5th century early proto-protestants.

On his return to Severus in Gaul he was ordained; and, having soon afterwards inherited means through the death of his father, he set out for Palestine, where Saint Jerome received him with great respect at Bethlehem. The stay of Vigilantius lasted for some time; but, as was almost inevitable, he became involved in the dispute then raging about Origen of Alexandria (c. 184 – c. 253), in the course of which Vigilantius accused Jerome of Origenism.

On his return to the West Vigilantius bore a letter from Jerome to Paulinus, and at various places where he stopped on the way he appears to have expressed himself about Jerome in a manner that - when reported - gave great offence to that father, and provoked him to write a reply (Ep. 61). Vigilantius now settled for some time in Gaul, and is said by one authority (Gennadius) to have afterwards held a charge in the diocese of Barcelona. About 403, some years after his return from the East, Vigilantius wrote his work against some church practices, in which he argued against the veneration of relics, as also against the vigils in the basilicas of the martyrs, then so common, the sending of alms to Jerusalem, the rejection of earthly goods and the attribution of special virtue to the unmarried state, especially in the case of the clergy. He was especially indignant in the veneration of saints and their relics.

All knowledge of his work comes from Jerome's treatise Contra Vigilantium. In time, the Church accepted Jerome's views as correct, and Vigilantius gradually came to be ranked among heretics, though his influence remained potent for a time in both France and Spain, as is shown by the polemical tract of Faustus of Rhegium (died c. 490).

One school of thought attempts to associate Vigilantius with proto-Waldensians in the European Alps. The doctrines of Vigilantius, at least to the extent that they are understood on the basis of Jerome's letter, feature strongly in the 'Twelve Conclusions' of the English Lollards.

== Beliefs ==
Vigilantius opposed monastic ascetism and superstitions connected with it. Jerome attacked Vigilantius, even calling him a monster; for "believing that the graves of martyrs and saints should not be venerated, opposing virginity and being against fasting for the saints."

Vigilantius also denied the veneration of saints and relics, which he considered superstition and idolatry. Vigilantius said his adversaries "worshipped bones and ash of dead men" and called them idolaters.

Vigilantius also attacked intercession for the dead as useless.
