= Aristotle's views on women =

Bust of Aristotle (c. 330 BC)

Aristotle's views on women are derived from his political theory, psychology, and biology, which together establish a unified hierarchical system. Across the Politics, Rhetoric, Nicomachean Ethics and Generation of Animals, he posits women as possessing deliberative reason but lacking authority, legitimizing their subordination to male rule within the household and polis. He frames women as biologically passive, contributing nutritive material while males provide formative semen, embedding sex hierarchy in a natural order. Some scholars argue women should exercise practical wisdom (phronēsis) in domestic roles, yet Aristotle excludes them from civic deliberation. He also excludes them from discussions on pregnancy and abortion. His views, reflecting ancient Greek patriarchy, justified women's inferiority, influencing medieval and modern gender debates.

== Rational capacity ==
Aristotle groups household relations into master–slave, father–child, and husband–wife, assigning to each a form of rule (archē) proportionate to the ruled party's share in deliberative reason. Women possess that faculty, he says, yet "lack authority," a condition that legitimises the husband's permanent rule while distinguishing wives from slaves, who "wholly lack" reason. Aristotle’s distinction between possessing reason and exercising authority is seen as one of the main ways he justified a gender hierarchy and kept women out of positions of rule.

Modern scholars label this partial rational competence. Smith argues that wives can weigh "ethical particulars" in domestic life but are excluded from the architectonic prudence (phronēsis) needed for civic deliberation. Thereby, women serve as rational agents whose judgement nonetheless remains under male supervision. This means that women were allowed a limited form of rational participation, only in private scenarios, and only male citizens had full authority in the political sphere. This distinction allows Aristotle to maintain that women are capable of reasoning, while still denying them the authority that is needed to fully participate in politics.

The slave is wholly lacking the deliberative element; the female has it but it lacks authority; the child has it but it is incomplete.

— Aristotle, Politics 1.1260a11‑14

Sophia M. Connell (2021) holds that Aristotelian biology "sets women up for intelligence" and "does not curtail [them] either intellectually or morally." The term akuron ("unauthoritative") thus denotes an external lack of legal force: a wife's decisions "cannot make it that her own decision affects others' actions," even though her reasoning is intact. Because the husband "delegates whole domains … to his wife," she must deploy phronēsis in running the household. Male rule, Connell concludes, rests only on women's lesser "spiritedness," not on any deficit of reason.

Several writers emphasise the moral agency Aristotle still grants. Hursthouse uses his account of friendship (philia) to show how wives cultivate virtue inside their allotted sphere, while Baker argues that the household virtues women practise are indispensable to the city's overall moral economy.

Deslauriers links the judgement that women "lack authority" to Aristotle's biology of colder, matter‑providing females and hotter, form‑imparting males.

== Natural hierarchy and household rule ==
Aristotle embeds sexual hierarchy in what he calls the natural order of the polis. Like organs serving one body, differentiated functions enable the community to reach its end (telos). Aristotle’s justification for this hierarchy is based on his teleological view that everything possesses a natural purpose; assigning women supportive roles rather than giving them positions that could direct the goals of the polis. Thus "male rule and female obedience," writes María L. Femenías, appear in Aristotle as "necessary for attaining the aims of the polis." Darrell Dobbs adds that Aristotle wrote that the natural marital community has a monarchic household, with the husband as its leader. In this system, social roles are viewed as a natural result of biological differences, this supports the idea that hierarchy seen in the household should be the same as the hierarchy within the government.

Schematic diagram of Aristotle's household hierarchy. It visualises the three dyads he treats as "natural" to civic order -master‑slave, husband‑wife, and father‑child.

A woman's chief civic contribution, according to Aristotle, lies in reproduction and domestic stewardship, tasks that complement the free male's pursuit of public virtue. Samuel H. Baker argues that Aristotle treats the household virtues women cultivate (temperance, thrift, care) as indispensable to the city's moral economy, even though they remain subordinate to male deliberation. Deslauriers traces this role back to Aristotle's biology: semen supplies the ruling "form," menstrual matter the ruled "material," fixing an ontological basis for domestic hierarchy.

Aristotle insists that marital subordination differs from slavery; within Greek households, wife and slave occupy distinct ranks, whereas "among barbarians the female and the slave have the same status." Rist characterizes this as rendering women as "second-class" citizens in Aristotle's ideal polis.

Prudence Allen identifies Aristotle's theory of sex polarity, rooted in his metaphysics of form and matter, as foundational to a natural hierarchy in which the male is naturally positioned to rule and the female to be ruled, particularly within the household. Francis Sparshott points out, however, that Aristotle also endows women with courage and justice "in serving mode," suggesting a more complex moral valuation than a simple polarity of domination and passivity.

== Civic participation ==
Again, the male is by nature superior, and the female inferior; and the one rules, and the other is ruled; this principle, of necessity, extends to all mankind.

— Aristotle, Politics 1.5, 1254b13–14

Most scholars agree that Aristotle categorically excludes women from politics, despite differing in their broader interpretations of his philosophy.

Connell believes that Aristotle women's civic exclusion is due to temperament, not intellect. She stresses that Aristotelian biology "sets women up for intelligence … [and] does not curtail [them] either intellectually or morally."

Similarly, Dobbs observes that, although wives belong to the household that undergirds the city, Aristotle "denies them any share in decision‑making that directs common affairs." Rist calls their function is reproductive and managerial, not legislative or judicial. Deslauriers stresses that Aristotle withholds phronēsis, the architectonic virtue required for office‑holding, thereby fixing a constitutional boundary that women cannot cross. Sparshott sums up the consensus: Aristotle's political theory "makes no institutional space for female rule."

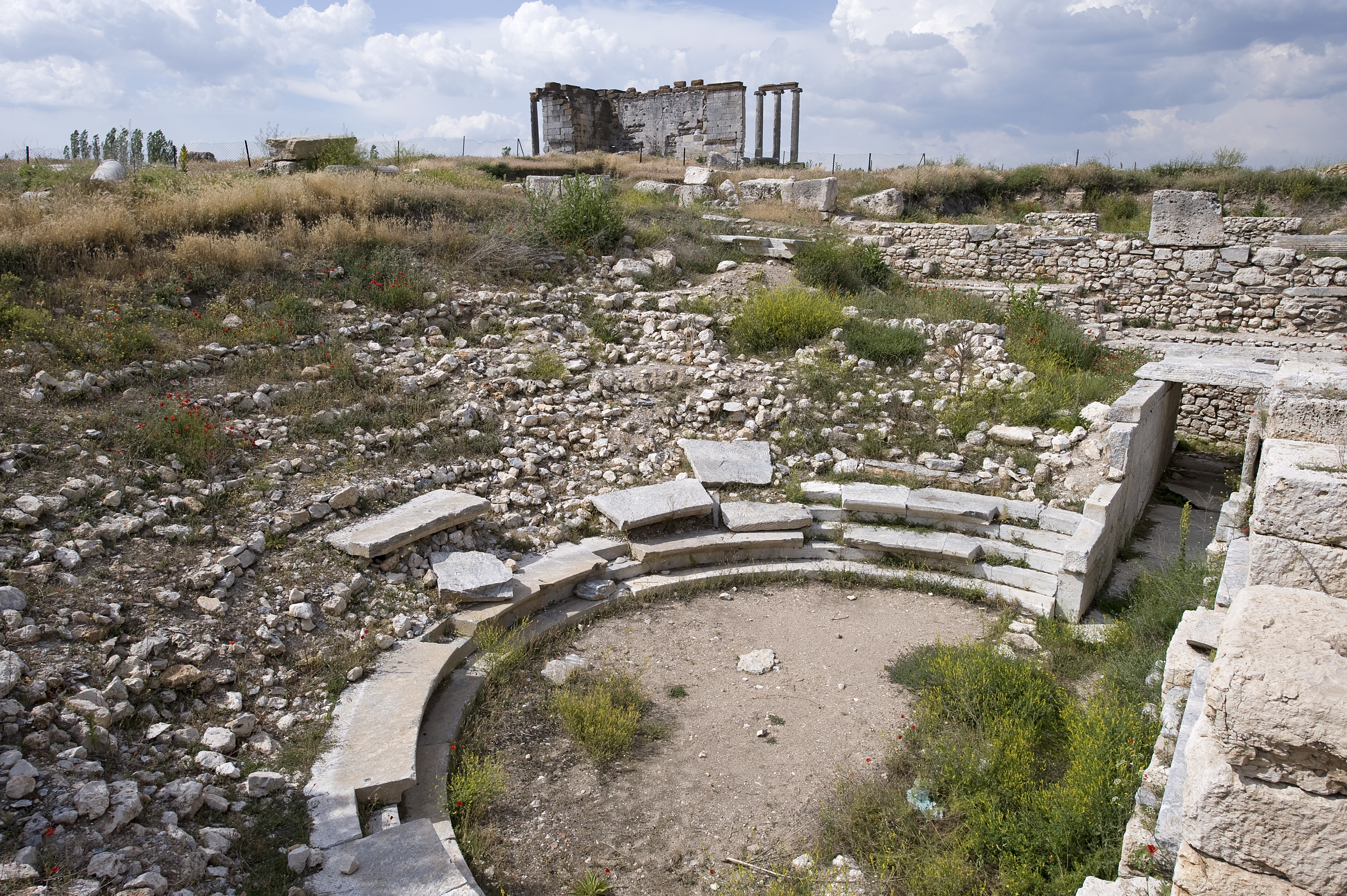
A part of a Greek Polis, this image is to illustrate a place where people can participate in a civic discussion.

A minority view detects a theoretical loophole. Baker notes that Aristotle counts practical household experience as a qualification for good legislation; if merit were the criterion, "women ought to hold office in assemblies" within an aristocratic or mixed regime. Hursthouse adds that Aristotle's account of ethical virtue does not restrict courage, temperance or justice to males. Smith, comparing Aristotle with Plato, argues that Aristotle's sharp distinction between ruling form and subordinate matter ultimately forecloses the Platonic option of female guardians, reinforcing the mainstream reading despite these openings.

== Biological theory ==
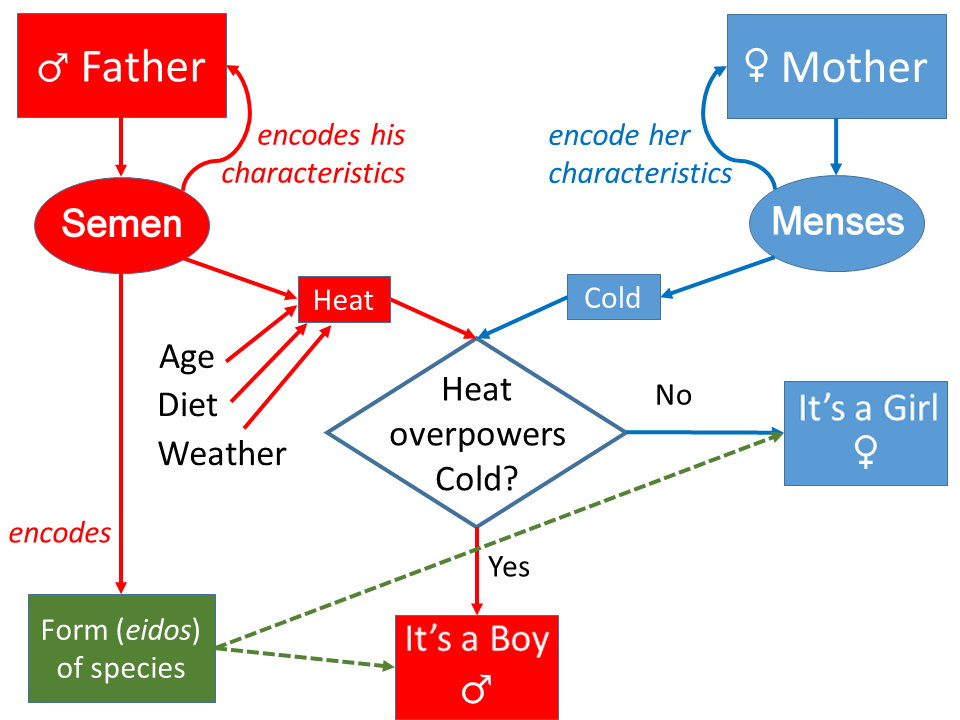
Aristotle's asymmetric model of inheritance

In Generation of Animals Aristotle frames sexual difference through his hylomorphic genetics: the male's semen supplies the "form" (eidos) that organises development, while the female contributes the nutritive material that sustains it, a role he linked to menstrual and other uterine fluids. Because the formative principle resides in semen, he cast the female body as comparatively passive, describing its organs chiefly in terms of gestation and lactation rather than the active shaping of offspring. Aristotle also believed that the female is a "misbegotten male" and that the male represents the standardized form in terms of human development. Some scholars think Aristotle’s theory of reproduction took his philosophical ideas about form and matter and applied them to biology. By doing this, he made the power gap between the male and female roles seem like it is just a part of nature. This model fits into Aristotle’s broader view that everything is composed of form and matter, with males linked to the active part that organizes and females being passive as the material contribution. As a result, biological differences are not treated as neutral, instead, they're used as evidence to support a bigger system of natural hierarchy that carries over into social and political life.

This theoretical asymmetry underpinned his wider physiological observations, such as his inquiries into the purpose of menstruation, vaginal secretions and orgasms, which he treated as functional adaptations geared towards embryonic nutrition and species survival.

Later Alexandrian anatomists, beginning with Herophilus, expanded these descriptions with the first systematic dissections of female genitalia, but did so within the Aristotelian teleological programme that subordinated anatomy to reproductive ends.

Modern commentators note that this model exemplifies Aristotle's broader medical method, integrating observation with causal analysis and folding female biology into his general account of health as a bodily virtue oriented to the good of the organism.

== Abortion ==
Aristotle's ideal world was where the number of children born equaled the resources available. Due to this, Aristotle condoned abortion, seeing it as a means of maintaining a healthy population. He considered a lawful abortion being at the point before the fetus has the ability to live, as to Aristotle a fetus was not yet a person. However, he also allowed the option of infanticide as a way to bring down a high population.

Common Greek opinion was that the mother had no say in a fetus' fate as it was considered only the father's as it was believed that the active role in making offspring was from the father. Aristotle agreed with this, believing that the needs and desires of the mothers were not necessary to the decision of abortion. Aristotle deemed forcing or encouraging women to get an abortion a valid way to keep population proportionate to resources and monitor population growth.

== Reception ==
Aristotle's empirical observations of women in fourth-century B.C. Greece became the cornerstone of medieval and early modern claims about their inferiority and subordination. Despite Maryanne Cline Horowitz's emphasis on the "scientific" basis of his biological and political writings, his brief and vague remarks resist definitive interpretation. This ambiguity fuels ongoing debates over whether his comments should be read as literal philosophical assertions or as literary constructs with hidden meanings akin to Plato's dialogues.

=== Middle Ages ===
During the Middle Ages, the rediscovery of Aristotle's Politics and biological texts provided scholars a "scientific" basis for entrenched beliefs about female inferiority. Vern L. Bullough highlights how medieval authors cited Aristotle's claim that women were "intellectually and morally inferior," treating it as empirical proof of gender hierarchy.

Within universities, Aristotelian logic shaped scholastic debates about women's roles. Thinkers like Ptolemy of Lucca and Giles of Rome echoed Aristotle's idea of women as "incomplete men" to argue against female participation in combat. Albert the Great and Thomas Aquinas reinforced these views, with Aquinas integrating biblical references (e.g., 1 Corinthians 14:34–35) to support women's subordination.

Later thinkers, like Peter of Auvergne and Nicholas of Vaudémont, continued to affirm women's moral inferiority, with Nicholas even equating female prudence with slyness. Literary polemicists amplified these ideas, with R. Howard Bloch noting that Aristotle's name was invoked by nearly every medieval misogynist writer, granting classical authority to anti-women rhetoric.

By the late Middle Ages, a dual tradition emerged: while Christian writers praised female virtue, Aristotelian moral philosophy persisted in upholding gender distinctions.

=== Contemporary scholarship ===
Contemporary scholars assert that Aristotle's views on women were misogynistic and defends a sexist political order, reflecting the patriarchal norms of ancient Greece. His philosophy presents the subordination of women within both society and the household as natural and justified. The Aristotelian framework, shaped by broader patriarchal ideology in ancient Greece, contributed to a longstanding justification for the exclusion of women from citizenship and political participation.

Aristotle's claims about women's nature, especially their so-called deficiency or incompleteness, have significantly influenced later theorizing about gender, but contemporary theorists mostly critique such biological and political conclusions.

While some argue that Aristotle's method reflects his observation of the apparent roles and behaviors of women in his context, these "appearances" have been shown to rest on social conventions rather than immutable natures. Some historians argue that Aristotle’s views made the existing Greek assumptions about gender integrated deeper into the culture rather than challenging them, this gave a philosophical justification to the standards that were already being accepted during his time. Feminist philosophers such as Ikea and Okpokwasili describe Aristotle's views as "vitriolic and fallacious," asserting they are incompatible with principles of gender equality and should be rejected in the present day. Modern feminist scholars interpret Aristotle’s views as an attempt to explain social hierarchies, based on nature, instead of forming a new view based on his observations. They point out that Aristotle’s conclusions were a reflection of the social norms of his time, not some kind of objective biological or philosophical truth. Maryanne Cline Horowitz suggests that Aristotle’s views did not challenge the existing Greek assumptions about gender; instead, he justified them as a system within his philosophies.

Across recent literature, the consensus is that Aristotle's defense of a natural hierarchy in domestic and civic life, founded on his metaphysics and observations, is fundamentally interwoven with ancient and later patriarchal norms, and that his justification for the subordination of women is no longer accepted by contemporary theorists.

== Primary sources ==
- Aristotle's Politics. Aristotle. (1920). Aristotle's Politics (B. Jowett, Trans.; H. W. C. Davis, Ed.). Clarendon Press.
- Rhetoric (Freese). Aristotle. (1926). Rhetoric (J. H. Freese, Trans.). Harvard University Press.
- Nicomachean Ethics (Ross). Aristotle. (1908). Nicomachean Ethics (W. D. Ross, Trans.).
- On the Generation of Animals. Aristotle. (1912). On the generation of animals (A. Platt, Trans.).
