= Theriophily =

Theriophily (or animalitarianism) is "the inversion of human and animal traits and the argument that animals are in some way superior to men".

== Background ==
The term theriophily was coined by George Boas, while the term animalitarianism was coined by Arthur O. Lovejoy in the work A Documentary History of Primitivism and Related Ideas, in which he explained his "belief that animals are happier, more admirable, more 'normal', or 'natural', than human beings" In his work Love for Animals, Dix Harwood wrote "This much is certain. Between 1700 and 1800, the point of view on man's relations to other living creatures changed". Leonardo da Vinci touches upon the subject in Studies on the Life and Habits of Animals.Rochester, in 'A Satyr against Mankind' would rather'be a dog, a monkey or a bear/Or anything but that vain animal/Who is so proud of being rational'. Jonathan Swift wrote about human inferiority in Gulliver's Travels and Mark Twain detailed various ways that humans could be shown to be inferior to other animals in Letters from the Earth.
