= Christian Church =

Ecclesiological concept

In ecclesiology, the Christian Church is what different Christian denominations conceive of as being the true body of Christians or the original institution established by Jesus Christ. "Christian Church" has also been used in academia as a synonym for Christianity, despite the fact that it is composed of multiple churches or denominations, many of which hold a doctrinal claim of being the one true church to the exclusion of the others.

For many Protestant Christians, the Christian Church has two components: the church visible, institutions in which "the Word of God purely preached and listened to, and the sacraments administered according to Christ's institution", as well as the church invisible—all "who are truly saved" (with these beings members of the visible church). In this understanding of the invisible church, "Christian Church" (or catholic Church) does not refer to a particular Christian denomination, but includes all individuals who have been saved. This is in contrast to the one true church applied to a specific concrete Christian institution, a Christian ecclesiological position maintained by the Catholic Church, the Lutheran Churches, the Eastern Orthodox Church, the Oriental Orthodox churches, Assyrian Church of the East, and the Ancient Church of the East. While holding this view, the Lutheran Churches teach that "there are indeed true Christians in other churches" as "other denominations also preach the Word of God, though mixed with error". The branch theory, which is maintained by some Anglicans, holds that those Churches that have preserved apostolic succession are part of the true Church, though the majority of Anglicanism has historically "followed the major continental Reformers in their doctrine of the true church, identifiable by the authentic ministry of word and sacrament, in their rejection of the jurisdiction of the pope, and in their alliance with the civil authority ('the magistrate')".

Most English translations of the New Testament generally use the word church as a translation of the Ancient Greek ἐκκλησία (romanized ecclesia), found in the original Greek texts, which generally meant an "assembly" or "congregation". This term appears in two verses of the Gospel of Matthew, 24 verses of the Acts of the Apostles, 58 verses of the Pauline epistles (including the earliest instances of its use in relation to a Christian body), two verses of the Letter to the Hebrews, one verse of the Epistle of James, three verses of the Third Epistle of John, and 19 verses of the Book of Revelation. In total, ἐκκλησία appears 114 times in the New Testament, although not every instance is a technical reference to the church. As such it is used for local communities as well as in a universal sense to mean all believers. The earliest recorded use of the term Christianity (Greek: Χριστιανισμός) was by Ignatius of Antioch, in around 100 AD.

The Four Marks of the Church first expressed in the Nicene Creed (381) are that the Church is one, holy, catholic (universal), and apostolic (originating from the apostles).

== Etymology ==
The Greek word ekklēsia, literally "called out" or "called forth" and commonly used to indicate a group of individuals called to gather for some function, in particular an assembly of the citizens of a city, as in Acts 19:32–41, is the New Testament term referring to the Christian Church (either a particular local group or the whole body of the faithful). In the Septuagint, the Greek word "ἐκκλησία" is used to translate the Hebrew "קהל" (qahal). Most Romance and Celtic languages use derivations of this word, either inherited or borrowed from the Latin form ecclesia.

The English language word "church" is from the Old English word cirice or Circe, derived from West Germanic *kirika, which in turn comes from the Greek κυριακή kuriakē, meaning "of the Lord" (possessive form of κύριος kurios "ruler" or "lord"). Kuriakē in the sense of "church" is most likely a shortening of κυριακὴ οἰκία kuriakē oikia ("house of the Lord") or ἐκκλησία κυριακή ekklēsia kuriakē ("congregation of the Lord"). Christian churches were sometimes called κυριακόν kuriakon (adjective meaning "of the Lord") in Greek starting in the 4th century, but ekklēsia and βασιλική basilikē were more common.

The word is one of many direct Greek-to-Germanic loans of Christian terminology, via the Goths. The Slavic terms for "church" (Old Church Slavonic црькꙑ [crĭky], Bulgarian църква [carkva], Russian церковь [cerkov'], Slovenian cerkev) are via the Old High German cognate chirihha.

== History ==
An Eastern icon depicting the Descent of the Holy Spirit. The date of Pentecost is considered the "Birthday of the Church".

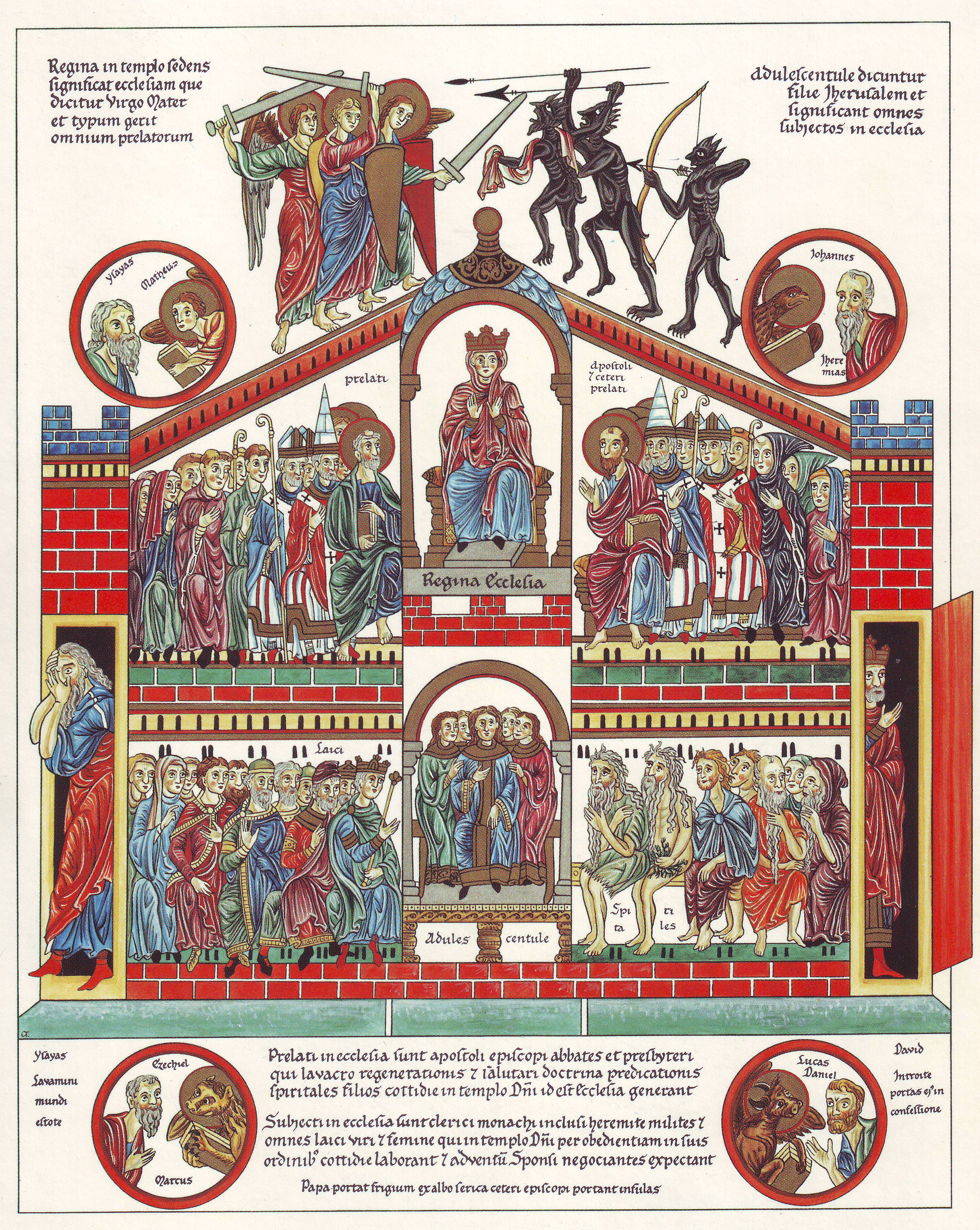
Medieval illustration of the ecclesia from the Hortus deliciarum of Herrad of Landsberg (12th century)

The Christian Church originated in Roman Judea in the first century AD/CE, founded on the teachings of Jesus of Nazareth, who first gathered disciples. Those disciples later became known as "Christians"; according to Scripture, Jesus commanded them to spread his teachings to all the world. For most Christians, the holiday of Pentecost (an event that occurred after Jesus' ascension to Heaven) represents the birthday of the Church, signified by the descent of the Holy Spirit on gathered disciples.

Springing out of Second Temple Judaism, from Christianity's earliest days, Christians accepted non-Jews (Gentiles) without requiring full adoption of Jewish customs (such as circumcision). The parallels in the Jewish faith are the Proselytes, Godfearers, and Noahide Law; see also Biblical law in Christianity. Some think that conflict with Jewish religious authorities quickly led to the expulsion of Christians from the synagogues in Jerusalem.

The Church gradually spread throughout the Roman Empire and beyond, gaining major establishments in cities such as Jerusalem, Antioch, and Edessa. The Roman authorities persecuted it because Christians refused to make sacrifice to the Roman gods, and challenged the imperial cult. The Church was legalized in the Roman empire, and then promoted by Emperors Constantine I and Theodosius I in the 4th century as the State Church of the Roman Empire.

Already in the 2nd century, Christians denounced teachings that they saw as heresies, especially Gnosticism but also Montanism. Ignatius of Antioch at the beginning of that century and Irenaeus at the end saw union with the bishops as the test of correct Christian faith. After legalization of the Church in the 4th century, the debate between Arianism and Trinitarianism, with the emperors favouring now one side now the other, was a major controversy.

=== Use by early Christians ===
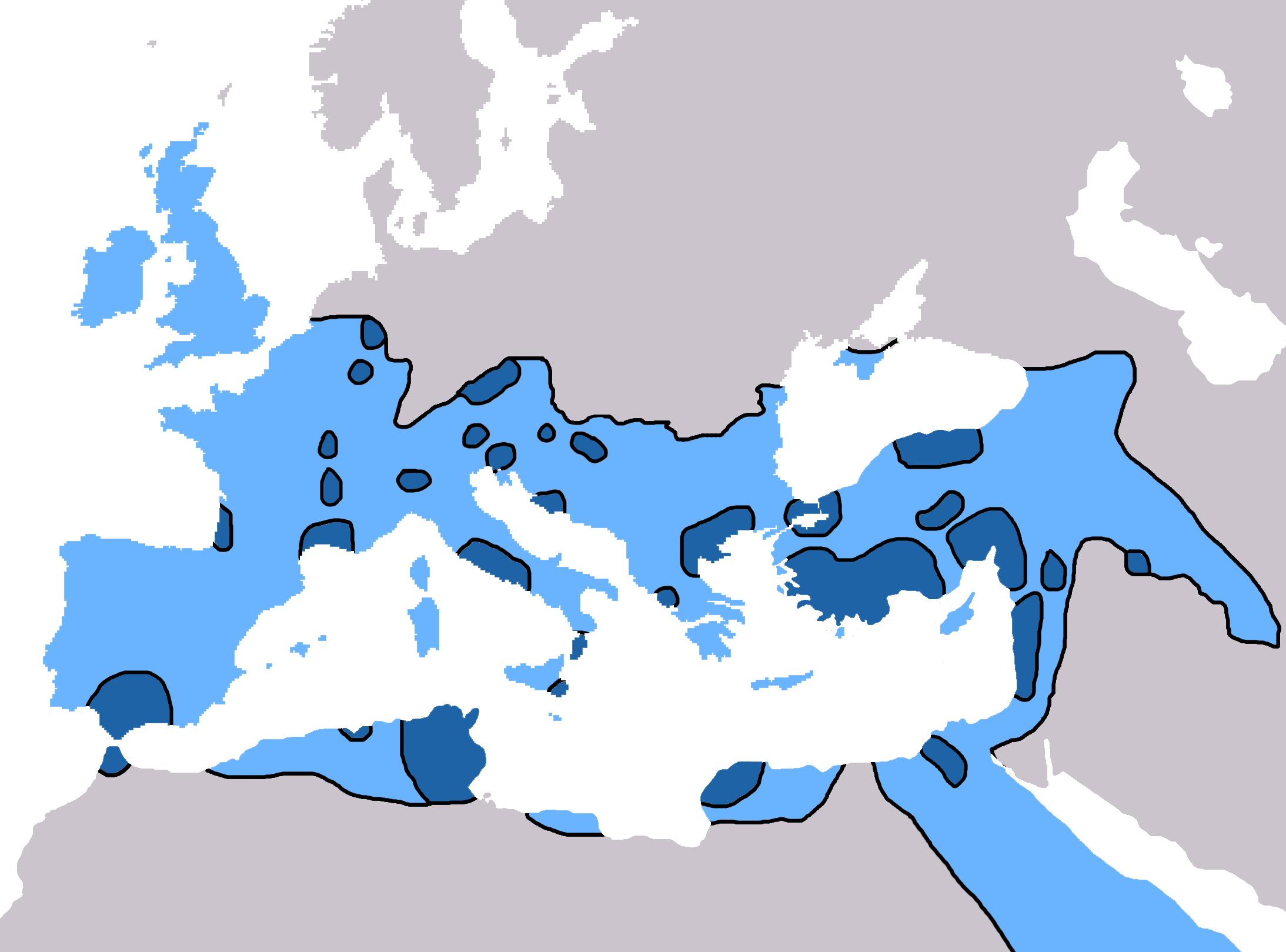
Predominantly Christian region by AD 325 Predominantly Christian region by AD 600

In using the word ἐκκλησία (ekklēsia), early Christians were employing a term that, while it designated the assembly of a Greek city-state, in which only citizens could participate, was traditionally used by Greek-speaking Jews to speak of Israel, the people of God, and that appeared in the Septuagint in the sense of an assembly gathered for religious reasons, often for a liturgy; in that translation ἐκκλησία stood for the Hebrew word קהל (qahal), which however it also rendered as συναγωγή (synagōgē, "synagogue"), the two Greek words being largely synonymous until Christians distinguished them more clearly.

The term ἐκκλησία appears in only two verses of the Gospels, in both cases in the Gospel of Matthew. When Jesus says to Simon Peter, "You are Peter, and on this rock I will build my church", the church is the community instituted by Christ; in the second passage, concerning the correction of a believer's errors, the church is the local community to which one belongs: "If he refuses to listen to them, tell it to the church."

The term is used much more frequently in other parts of the New Testament, designating, as in the Gospel of Matthew, either an individual local community or all of them collectively. Even passages that do not use the term ἐκκλησία may refer to the church with other expressions, as in the first 14 chapters of the Epistle to the Romans, in which ἐκκλησία is totally absent but which repeatedly uses the cognate word κλήτοι (klētoi, "called"). The church may be referred to also through images traditionally employed in the Bible to speak of the people of God, such as the image of the vineyard used particularly in the Gospel of John.

The New Testament never uses the adjectives "catholic" or "universal" with reference to the Christian Church, but does indicate that the local communities are one church, collectively, that Christians must always seek to be in concord, as the Congregation of God, that the Gospel must extend to the ends of the earth and to all nations, that the church is open to all peoples and must not be divided, etc.

The first recorded application of "catholic" or "universal" to the church is by Ignatius of Antioch in about 107 in his Epistle to the Smyrnaeans, chapter VIII: "Wherever the bishop appears, there let the people be; as wherever Jesus Christ is, there is the Catholic Church."

=== Christianity as Roman state religion ===
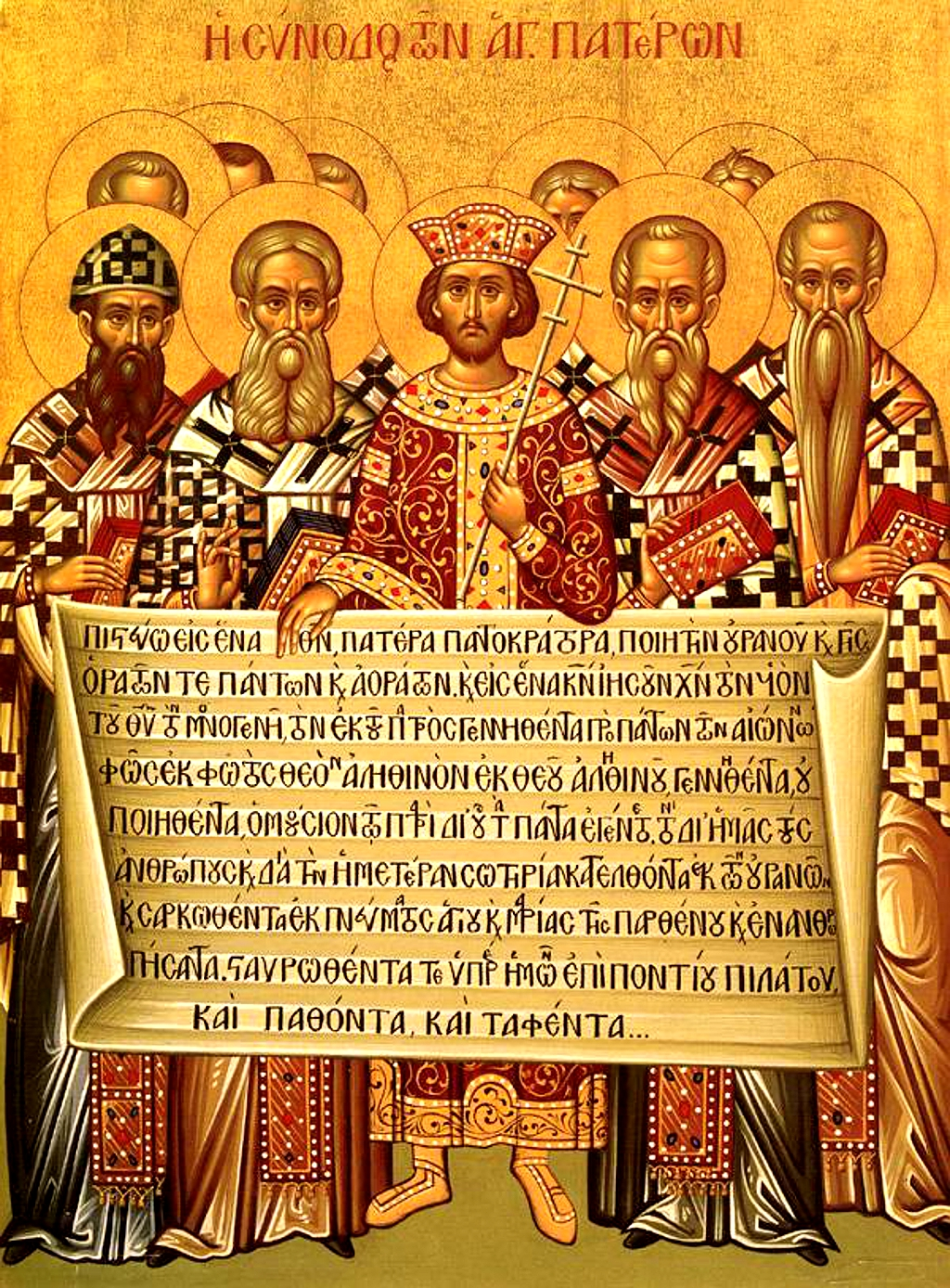
An icon depicting Constantine I, accompanied by the bishops of the First Council of Nicaea (325), holding the Niceno–Constantinopolitan Creed of 381.

On 27 February 380, the Roman Empire officially adopted the Nicene version of Christianity as its state religion. Prior to this date, Constantius II (337–361) and Valens (364–378) had personally favored Arian or Semi-Arian forms of Christianity, but Valens' successor Theodosius I supported the more Athanasian or Trinitarian doctrine as expounded in the Nicene Creed from the 1st Council of Nicaea.

On this date, Theodosius I decreed that only the followers of Trinitarian Christianity were entitled to be referred to as Catholic Christians, while all others were to be considered to be heretics, which was considered illegal. In 385, this new legal situation resulted, in the first case of many to come, in the capital punishment of a heretic, namely Priscillian, condemned to death, with several of his followers, by a civil tribunal for the crime of magic. In the centuries of state-sponsored Christianity that followed, pagans and heretical Christians were routinely persecuted by the Empire and the many kingdoms and countries that later occupied its place, but some Germanic tribes remained Arian well into the Middle Ages (see also Christendom).

The Church within the Roman Empire was organized under metropolitan sees, with five rising to particular prominence and forming the basis for the Pentarchy proposed by Justinian I. Of these five, one was in the West (Rome) and the rest in the East (Constantinople, Jerusalem, Antioch, and Alexandria).

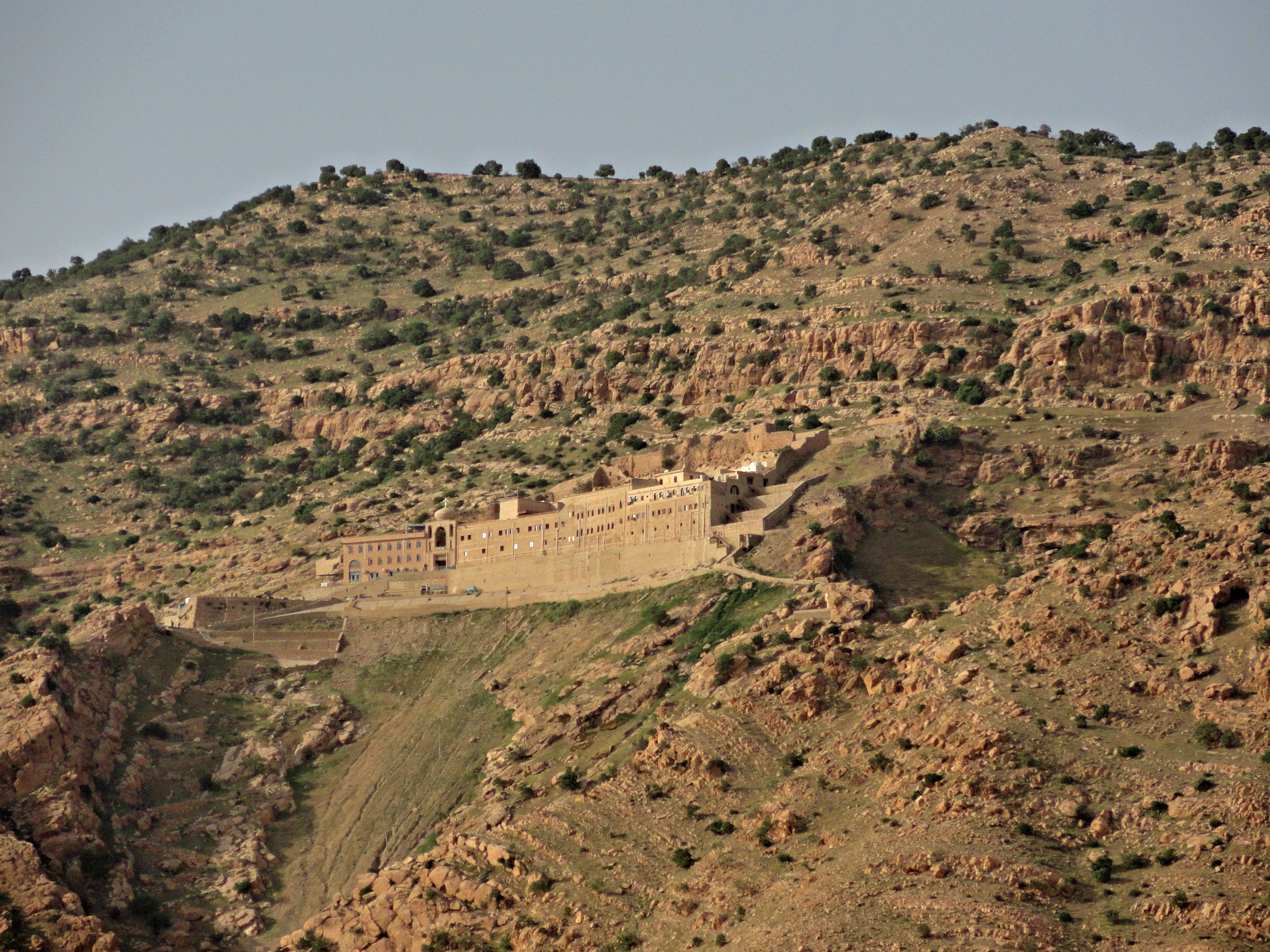
Founded in AD 363, Mar Mattai Monastery, a Nestorian Church, is recognized as one of the oldest Christian monasteries in existence.

Even after the split of the Roman Empire the Church remained a relatively united institution (apart from Oriental Orthodoxy and some other groups which separated from the rest of the state-sanctioned Church earlier). The Church came to be a central and defining institution of the Empire, especially in the East or Byzantine Empire, where Constantinople came to be seen as the center of the Christian world, owing in great part to its economic and political power.

Once the Western Empire fell to Germanic incursions in the 5th century, the (Roman) Church became for centuries the primary link to Roman civilization for medieval Western Europe and an important channel of influence in the West for the Eastern Roman, or Byzantine, emperors. While, in the West, the so-called orthodox Church competed against the Arian Christian and pagan faiths of the Germanic rulers and spread outside what had been the Empire to Ireland, Germany, Scandinavia, and the western Slavs, in the East Christianity spread to the Slavs in what is now Russia, south-central and eastern Europe.

Starting in the 7th century, the Islamic Caliphates rose and gradually began to conquer larger and larger areas of the Christian world. Excepting North Africa and most of Spain, northern and western Europe escaped largely unscathed by Islamic expansion, in great part because richer Constantinople and its empire acted as a magnet for the onslaught. The challenge presented by the Muslims would help to solidify the religious identity of eastern Christians even as it gradually weakened the Eastern Empire. Even in the Muslim World, the Church survived (e.g., the modern Copts, Maronites, and others) albeit at times with great difficulty.

=== Great Schism of 1054 ===
Although there had long been frictions between the Bishop of Rome (i.e., the patriarch of the Catholic Church proper) and the eastern patriarchs within the Byzantine Empire, Rome's changing allegiance from Constantinople to the Frankish king Charlemagne set the Church on a course towards separation. The political and theological divisions would grow until Rome and the East excommunicated each other in the 11th century, ultimately leading to the division of the Church into the Western (Catholic) and Eastern (Orthodox) churches. In 1448, not long before the Byzantine Empire collapsed, the Russian Orthodox Church gained independence from the Patriarch of Constantinople.

As a result of the redevelopment of Western Europe, and the gradual fall of the Eastern Roman Empire to the Arabs and Turks (helped by warfare against Eastern Christians), the final Fall of Constantinople in 1453 resulted in Eastern scholars fleeing to the West bringing ancient manuscripts, which was a factor in the beginning of the period of the Western Renaissance there. Rome was seen by the Western Church as Christianity's heartland. Some Eastern churches even broke with Eastern Orthodoxy and entered into communion with Rome (the "Uniate" Eastern Catholic Churches).

=== Protestant Reformation ===
The changes brought on by the Renaissance eventually led to the Protestant Reformation during which the Protestant Lutheran and the Reformed followers of Calvin, Hus, Zwingli, Melancthon, Knox, and others split from the Catholic Church. At this time, a series of non-theological disputes also led to the English Reformation which led to the independence of the Church of England. Then, during the Age of Exploration and the Age of Imperialism, Western Europe spread the Catholic Church and the Protestant churches around the world, especially in the Americas. These developments in turn have led to Christianity being the largest religion in the world today.

== Catholic tradition ==
The Catholic Church teaches in its doctrine that it is the original church founded by Christ on the Apostles in the 1st century AD.

The encyclical of Pope Pius IX, Singulari Quidem, states: "There is only one true, holy, Catholic Church, which is the Apostolic Roman Church. There is only one See founded on Peter by the word of the Lord [...] Outside of the Church, no one can hope for life or salvation unless he is excused through ignorance beyond his control."

The papal encyclical Mystici corporis (Pope Pius XII, 1943), expresses the dogmatic ecclesiology of the Catholic Church thus: "If we would define and describe this true Church of Jesus Christ—which is the One, Holy, Catholic, Apostolic, Roman Church–we shall find no expression more noble, more sublime, or more divine, than the phrase which calls it 'the Mystical Body of Jesus Christ'." The Second Vatican Council's dogmatic constitution, Lumen gentium (1964), further declares that "the one Church of Christ which in the Creed is professed as one, holy, catholic and apostolic, [...] constituted and organized in the world as a society, subsists in the Catholic Church, which is governed by the successor of Peter and by the Bishops in communion with him".

A 2007 declaration of the Congregation for the Doctrine of the Faith clarified that, in this passage, "'subsistence' means this perduring, historical continuity and the permanence of all the elements instituted by Christ in the Catholic Church, in which the Church of Christ is concretely found on this earth", and acknowledged that grace can be operative within religious communities separated from the Catholic Church due to some "elements of sanctification and truth" within them, but also added "Nevertheless, the word 'subsists' can only be attributed to the Catholic Church alone precisely because it refers to the mark of unity that we profess in the symbols of the faith (I believe... in the 'one' Church); and this 'one' Church subsists in the Catholic Church."

The Catholic Church teaches that only corporate bodies of Christians led by bishops with valid holy orders can be recognized as "churches" in the proper sense. In Catholic documents, communities without such bishops are formally called ecclesial communities.

== Eastern Orthodox tradition ==
The Eastern Orthodox Church claims to be the original Christian Church. The Eastern Orthodox Church bases its claim primarily on its assertion that it holds to traditions and beliefs of the original Christian Church. It also claims that four out of the five sees of the Pentarchy (excluding Rome) are still a part of it.

== Oriental Orthodox tradition ==
The Oriental Orthodox Churches claims to be the original Christian Church. The Oriental Orthodox churches' bases their claim primarily on its assertion that it holds to traditions and beliefs of the original Christian Church. They never adopted the theory of the Nature of God, which was formulated later than the break that followed the Council of Chalcedon.

== Lutheran tradition ==
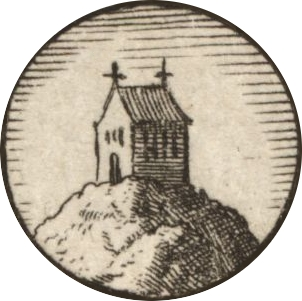
The Church is the congregation of saints, in which the Gospel is rightly taught and the Sacraments are rightly administered. –Augsburg Confession

The Lutheran churches traditionally hold that their tradition represents the true visible Church. The Augsburg Confession found within the Book of Concord, a compendium of belief of the Lutheran Churches, teaches that "the faith as confessed by Luther and his followers is nothing new, but the true catholic faith, and that their churches represent the true catholic or universal church". When the Lutherans presented the Augsburg Confession to Charles V, Holy Roman Emperor in 1530, they believe to have "showed that each article of faith and practice was true first of all to Holy Scripture, and then also to the teaching of the church fathers and the councils".

Nevertheless, the Lutheran churches teach that "there are indeed true Christians in other churches" as "other denominations also preach the Word of God, though mixed with error"; since the proclamation of the Word of God bears fruit, Lutheran theology accepts the appellation "Church" for other Christian denominations.

== Anglican tradition ==
Anglicans generally understand their tradition as a branch of the historical "Catholic Church" and as a via media ("middle way") between traditions, often Lutheranism and Reformed Christianity, or Roman Catholicism and Reformed Christianity.

== Reformed tradition ==
Reformed theology defines the Church as being invisible and visible—the former includes the entire communion of saints and the latter is the "institution that God provides as an agency for God's saving, justifying, and sustaining activity", which John Calvin referred to as "our mother". The Reformed confessions of faith emphasize "the pure teaching of the gospel (pura doctrina evangelii) and the right administration of the sacraments (recta administratio sacramentorum)" as "the two most necessary signs of the true visible church".

== Methodist tradition ==
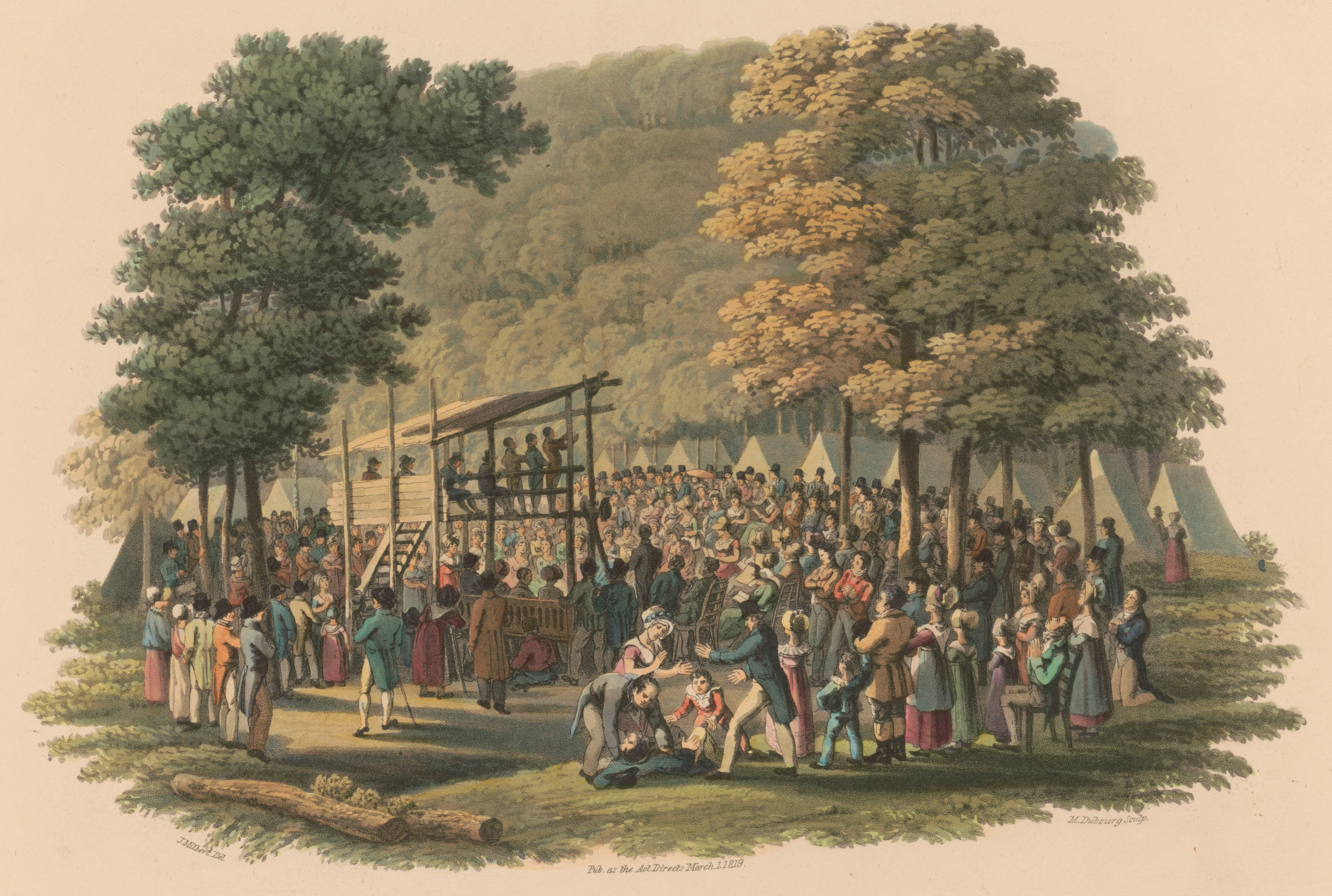
Methodist preachers are known for promulgating the doctrines of the new birth and entire sanctification to the public at events such as tent revivals, brush arbor revivals, and camp meetings, which they believe is the reason that God raised them up into existence.

Methodists affirm belief in "the one true Church, Apostolic and Universal", viewing their churches as constituting a "privileged branch of this true church". With regard to the position of Methodism within Christendom, the founder of the movement "John Wesley once noted that what God had achieved in the development of Methodism was no mere human endeavor but the work of God. As such it would be preserved by God so long as history remained." Calling it "the grand depositum" of the Methodist faith, Wesley specifically taught that the propagation of the doctrine of entire sanctification was the reason that God raised up the Methodists in the world.

== Baptist tradition ==
Many Baptists, who uphold the doctrine of Baptist successionism (also known as Landmarkism), "argue that their history can be traced across the centuries to New Testament times" and "claim that Baptists have represented the true church" that "has been, present in every period of history". Walter B. Shurden, the founding executive director of the Center for Baptist Studies at Mercer University, writes that the theology of Landmarkism, which he states is integral of the history of the Southern Baptist Convention, upholds the ideas that "Only Baptist churches can trace their lineage in uninterrupted fashion back to the New Testament, and only Baptist churches therefore are true churches." In addition Shurden writes that Baptists who uphold successionism believe that "only a true church-that is, a Baptist church-can legitimately celebrate the ordinances of baptism and the Lord's Supper. Any celebration of these ordinances by non-Baptists is invalid."

Other Baptists do not adhere to Landmarkism and thus hold a broader understanding of what constitutes the true Christian Church, e.g. the American Baptist Churches (which are maintain ecumenical relations with other Churches).

== Pentecostal tradition ==
In Pentecostalism, "ecclesiology as seen through his concept of networks, where the Holy Spirit creates an openness in mission which allows for coordinated effort towards church planting and growth."

== Divisions and controversies ==
Today there is a wide diversity of Christian groups, with a variety of different doctrines and traditions. These controversies between the various branches of Christianity naturally include significant differences in their respective ecclesiologies.

=== Christian denominations ===
"Denomination" is a generic term for a distinct Christian body identified by traits such as a common name, structure, leadership, or doctrine. Individual bodies, however, may use alternative terms to describe themselves, such as "church" or "fellowship". Divisions between one group and another are defined by doctrine and church authority; issues such as the nature of Jesus, the authority of apostolic succession, eschatology, and papal primacy often separate one denomination from another. Groups of denominations often sharing broadly similar beliefs, practices, and historical ties are known as branches of Christianity.

Individual Christian denominations vary widely in the degree to which they recognize one another. Several claim to be the direct and sole authentic successor the church founded by Jesus Christ in the 1st century AD. Others, however, believe in denominationalism, where some or all Christian denominations are legitimate churches of the same religion regardless of their distinguishing labels, beliefs, and practices. Because of this concept, some Christian bodies reject the term "denomination" to describe themselves, to avoid implying equivalency with other churches or denominations.

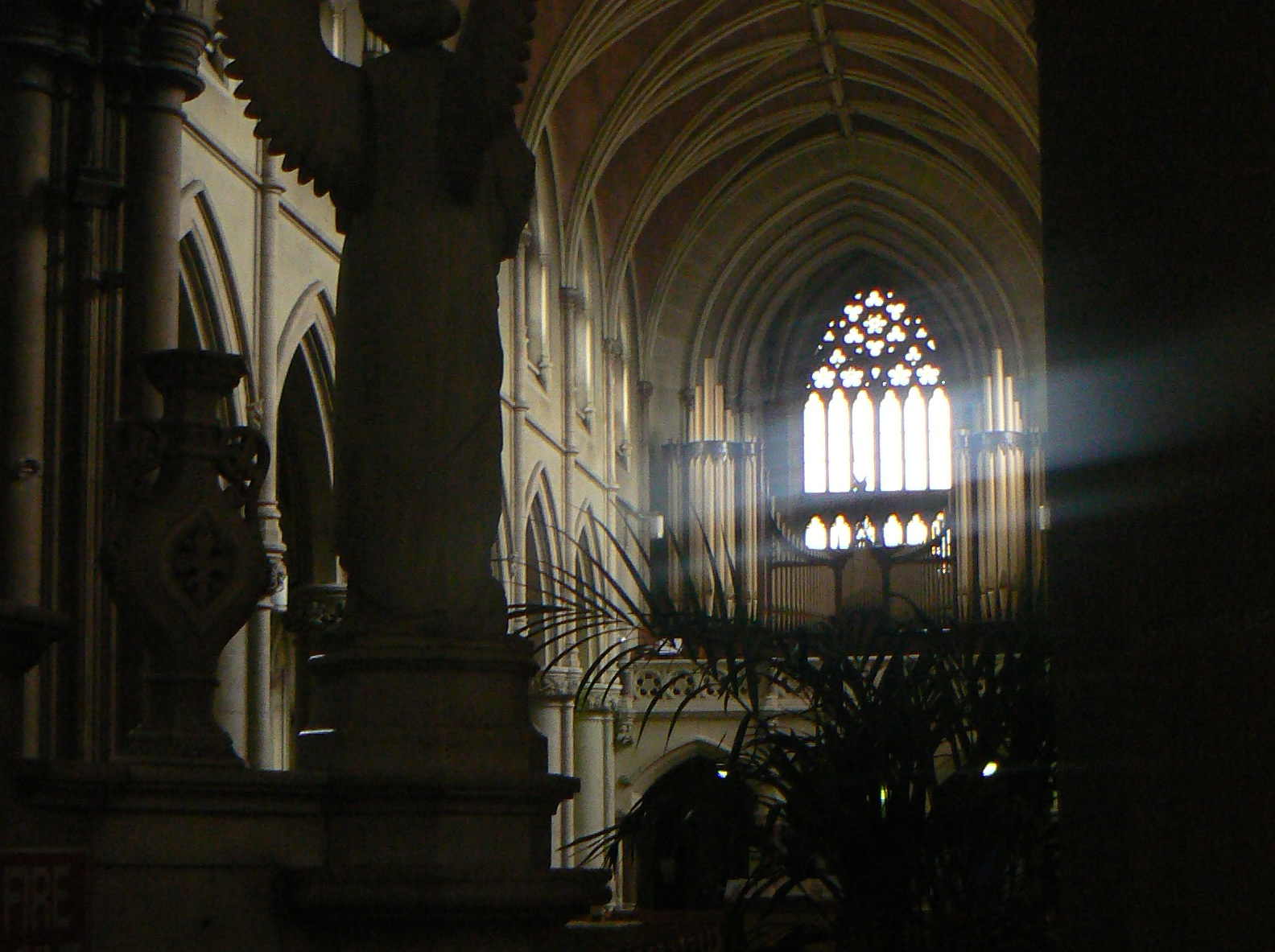
The nave of St. Peter's Church Phibsborough, Dublin, Ireland

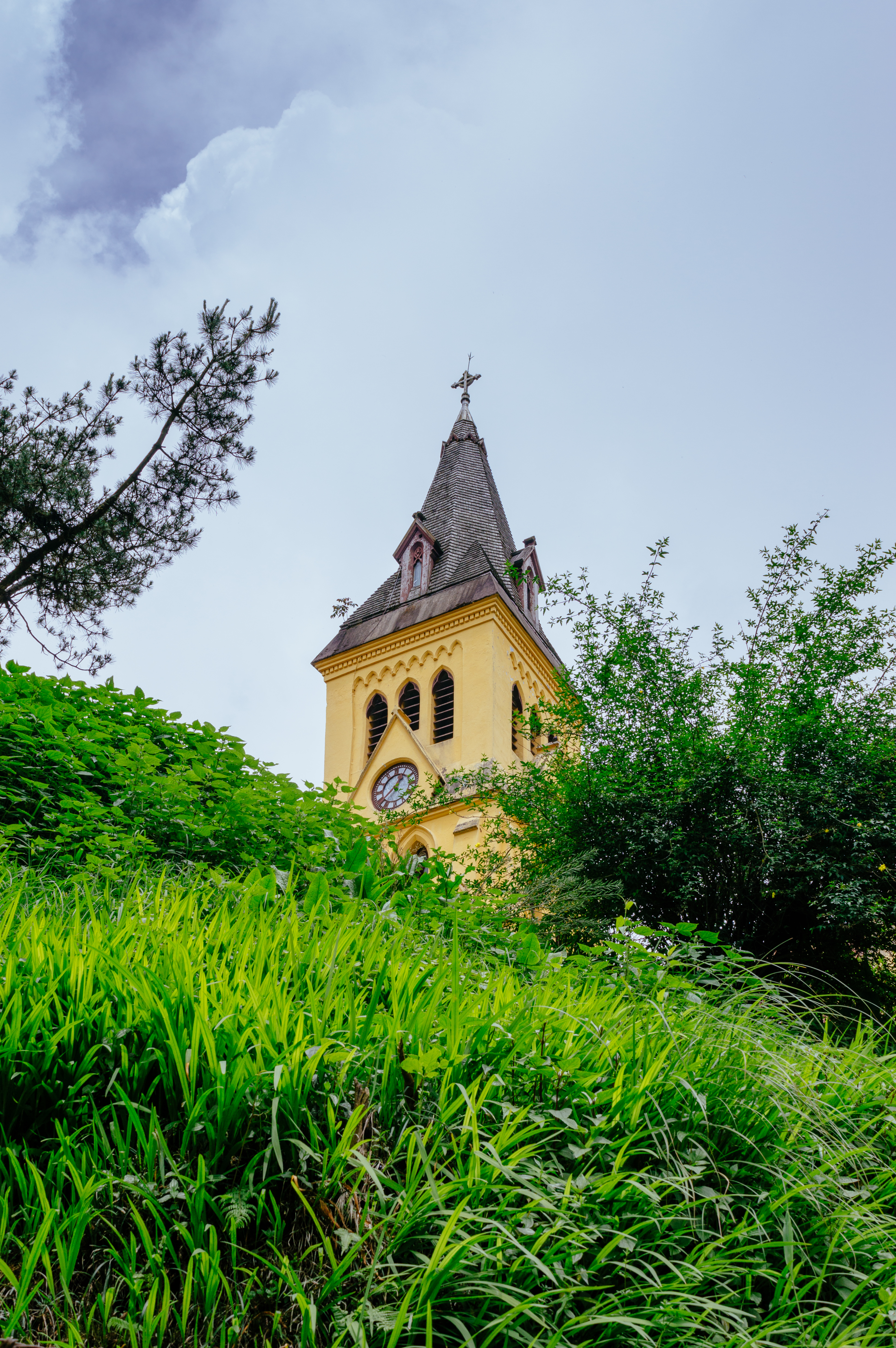
St. Andrew's Church, Darjeeling, India. Built- 1843, Rebuilt- 1873

The Catholic Church and Eastern Orthodox Church believe that the term one in the Nicene Creed describes and prescribes a visible institutional and doctrinal unity, not only geographically throughout the world, but also historically throughout history. They see unity as one of the four marks that the Creed attributes to the genuine Church, and the essence of a mark is to be visible. A church whose identity and belief varied from country to country and from age to age would not be "one" in their estimation. As such they see themselves not as a denomination, but as pre-denominational; not as one of many faith communities, but the original and sole true Church.

Many Baptist and Congregationalist theologians accept the local sense as the only valid application of the term church. They strongly reject the notion of a universal (catholic) church. These denominations argue that all uses of the Greek word ekklesia in the New Testament are speaking of either a particular local group or of the notion of "church" in the abstract, and never of a single, worldwide Church.

Many Anglicans, Lutherans, Old Catholics, and Independent Catholics view unity as a mark of catholicity, but see the institutional unity of the Catholic Church as manifested in the shared apostolic succession of their episcopacies, rather than a shared episcopal hierarchy or rites.

Reformed Christians hold that every person justified by faith in the Gospel committed to the Apostles is a member of "One, holy, catholic, and apostolic Church". From this perspective, the real unity and holiness of the whole church established through the Apostles is yet to be revealed; and meanwhile, the extent and peace of the church on earth is imperfectly realized in a visible way.

The Lutheran Church–Missouri Synod declares that the Christian Church, properly speaking, consists only of those who have faith in the gospel (i.e., the forgiveness of sins which Christ gained for all people), even if they are in church bodies that teach error, but excluding those who do not have such faith, even if they belong to a church or hold a teaching office in it.

=== World Christianity ===
A number of historians have noted a twentieth-century "global shift" in Christianity, from a religion largely found in Europe and the Americas to one which is found in the global south. Described as "World Christianity" or "Global Christianity", this term attempts to convey the global nature of the Christian religion. However, the term often focuses on "non-Western Christianity" which "comprises (usually the exotic) instances of Christian faith in 'the global South', in Asia, Africa and Latin America." It also includes indigenous or diasporic forms in Western Europe and North America.

== See also ==
- Chicago-Lambeth Quadrilateral
- Church architecture
- Church attendance
- Churching of women
- Ecumenism
- Evangelical Catholic
- Germanic Christianity
- Great Church
- High church and Low church
- Inculturation
- Kingdom of God
- List of Christian denominations
- List of Christian denominations by number of members
- List of popes
- Missiology
- Priesthood of all believers
- Restoration Movement
- Role of the Christian Church in civilization
- Unam sanctam

== Bibliography ==
- University of Virginia: Dictionary of the History of Ideas: Christianity in History, retrieved May 10, 2007
- University of Virginia: Dictionary of the History of Ideas: Church as an Institution, retrieved May 10, 2007
- Christianity and the Roman Empire, Ancient History Romans, BBC Home, retrieved May 10, 2007
- Orthodox Church, MSN Encarta, retrieved May 10, 2007Orthodox Church – MSN Encarta. Archived from the original on 2009-10-28.
- Catechism of the Catholic Church
- Balmer, Randall Herbert (2002). Encyclopedia of Evangelicalism. Louisville, KY: Westminster John Knox Press. ISBN 978-0-664-22409-7.
- Elwell, Walter; Comfort, Philip Wesley (2001). Tyndale Bible Dictionary. Tyndale House Publishers. ISBN 0-8423-7089-7.
- Mark Gstohl, Theological Perspectives of the Reformation, The Magisterial Reformation, retrieved May 10, 2007
- J. Faber, The Catholicity of the Belgic Confession, Spindle Works, The Canadian Reformed Magazine 18 (Sept. 20–27, Oct. 4–11, 18, Nov. 1, 8, 1969)-
- Boise State University: History of the Crusades: The Fourth Crusade
- United States Conference of Catholic Bishops: ARTICLE 9 "I BELIEVE IN THE HOLY CATHOLIC CHURCH": 830-831 : Provides Catholic interpretations of the term catholic
- Kenneth D. Whitehead, Four Marks of the Church, EWTN Global Catholic Network
- Herbermann, Charles, ed. (1913). "Unity (as a Mark of the Church)" . Catholic Encyclopedia. New York: Robert Appleton Company.
- "Church History" . Encyclopædia Britannica. Vol. 6 (11th ed.). 1911. pp. 330–345.
- Apostolic Succession, The Columbia Encyclopedia, Sixth Edition. 2001–05.
- Gerd Ludemann, Heretics: The Other Side of Early Christianity, Westminster John Knox Press, 1st American ed edition (August 1996), ISBN 0-664-22085-1, ISBN 978-0-664-22085-3
- From Jesus to Christ: Maps, Archaeology, and Sources: Chronology, PBS, retrieved May 19, 2007
- Bannerman, James, The Church of Christ: A treatise on the nature, powers, ordinances, discipline and government of the Christian Church, Still Waters Revival Books, Edmonton, Reprint Edition May 1991, First Edition 1869.
- Grudem, Wayne, Systematic Theology: An Introduction to Biblical Doctrine, Inter-Varsity Press, Leicester, England, 1994.
- Kuiper, R.B., The Glorious Body of Christ, The Banner of Truth Trust, Edinburgh, 1967
- Mannion, Gerard and Mudge, Lewis (eds.), The Routledge Companion to the Christian Church, 2007
