= Anne Libby =

American sculptor and installation artist

Anne Libby (born 1987, Los Angeles, California) is an American sculptor and installation artist. Her practice reimagines urban and industrial detritus, such as curtain wall glass, circuit boards, venetian blinds, and plywood, into abstract, architectonic sculptures and wall‑works . Her work has been reviewed in Mousse Magazine, Artforum, Art in America, and appeared in Architectural Digest among other publications.

== Early life ==
Libby was born in Los Angeles in 1987 and continues to live and work there. She earned a Bachelor of Fine Arts from the Rhode Island School of Design in 2009 and a Master of Fine Arts in Sculpture from Bard College's Milton Avery Graduate School of the Arts in 2017.

== Exhibitions ==
Libby is represented internationally by some contemporary art galleries. In New York, she is represented by Magenta Plains, where she has held multiple solo exhibitions since 2018, including Inner Green Echo (2023) and The Golden Door (2018). In Los Angeles, she is represented by Night Gallery, which has hosted several of her solo and collaborative exhibitions since 2015, most recently Even Odd (2025) and Rib Erosion (2023). In Europe, she has exhibited with Soft Opening in London and Ribordy Thetaz in Geneva.

== Selected solo and two-person exhibitions ==
- 2025 – Even Odd, Night Gallery, Los Angeles, USA
- 2023 – Inner Green Echo, Magenta Plains, New York, USA
- 2023 – Rib Erosion, with Anna Rosen, Night Gallery, Los Angeles, USA
- 2021 – See Me So, Night Gallery, Los Angeles, USA
- 2020 – Dilated Sky, Soft Opening, London, UK
- 2019 – Form Constant, Ribordy Thetaz, Geneva, Switzerland
- 2018 – The Golden Door, Magenta Plains, New York, USA
- 2016 – Earthflash, Night Gallery, Los Angeles, USA

== Reception ==
Her work has received critical attention. In Artforum, Abraham Adams selected her 2018 exhibition Earthflash at Night Gallery as a Critic's Pick, highlighting its material rigor and formal restraint. In Art in America, reviewer Liz Hirsch reflected on Libby's 2021 presentation at Various Small Fires, describing it as a subtle interplay between architectural form and corporeal presence.

Writing in Mousse Magazine in October 2020, Philipp Hindahl remarked that Libby's work "makes levels of reality meet in a hallucinatory way," drawing visual analogies to late-capitalist architecture through strategies of disruption and mimicry.
