= Dictionary of the History of Ideas =

The Dictionary of the History of Ideas: Studies of Selected Pivotal Ideas is a four-volume reference work on intellectual history published by Charles Scribner's Sons in 1973. Philip P. Wiener was its editor-in-chief. Associate editors included Isaiah Berlin, Salomon Bochner, and Ernest Nagel, It contains more than 300 articles written by 254 contributors, organized into seven categories. Contributors included Berlin, George Boas, Herbert Butterfield, Merle Curti, Mircea Eliade, Joan Kelly Gadol, Sidney Hook, Milton Konvitz, Leonard Kreiger, Judith Shklar, Peter N. Stearns, and René Wellek.

An updated edition (the New Dictionary of the History of Ideas), edited by Maryanne Cline Horowitz, was published in 2004. The 2004 edition has 700 articles across six volumes. Scribner made the 1973 edition available for free online after the new edition was published.

== Reception ==
Writing in the Journal of the History of Ideas, F.E.L. Priestley described the book as "monumental in the sense that it establishes, as a surveyor's monuments do, the boundaries and the main points of reference in a large map of intellectual territory."

Library Journal praised the 2004 edition for having a broader scope than its Eurocentric and male-focused predecessor. A review in Reference & User Services Quarterly concluded, "No other reference work offers the same breadth of coverage and accessibility."
