= Philip P. Wiener =

American philosopher (1905–1992)

- Born: July 8, 1905; New York City, New York, United States
- Died: April 5, 1992 (aged 86); Asheville, North Carolina, United States

Education
- Education: City College of New York BS Columbia University MA University of Southern California PhD

Philosophical work
- Region: Western philosophy
- School: Pragmatism
- Main interests: History of ideas, history and philosophy of science
- Notable ideas: Interdisciplinarity

Philip Paul Wiener (July 8, 1905 – April 5, 1992) was an American philosopher specializing in pragmatism, Charles S. Peirce, Leibniz, the history and philosophy of science, and the history of ideas. He co-founded the Journal of the History of Ideas.

== Early life and education ==
Wiener was born in New York City on July 8, 1905. After graduating with a BS from City College of New York and an MA from Columbia University, he studied philosophy at the University of Southern California, receiving a PhD in 1931.

== Academic career ==
In 1933, Wiener was appointed as a professor of philosophy at City College of New York and in 1968 he moved to Temple University, Philadelphia where he taught philosophy until his retirement in 1972.

Wiener was an authority on Pragmatism and on Charles Sanders Peirce, being present at a 1946 meeting during which the Charles S. Peirce Society was established. He was also greatly interested in the philosophy of Gottfried Wilhelm Leibniz, in Morris Raphael Cohen and in Pierre Duhem, and devoted much attention to the history and philosophy of science and to the developing discipline of the history of ideas.

In collaboration with Arthur Oncken Lovejoy he co-founded the Journal of the History of Ideas in 1940 and edited that journal for many years until a few years before his retirement. The Journal appeared during a period when academic disciplines were "rigidly distinct" from each other and it published "papers that involved more than one field or that presented matters of interest to more than one field". The Journal, which is still published, has promoted the "interdisciplinary" approach since its beginning, an uncommon focus in earlier decades that is now "commonplace".

Wiener was the editor-in-chief of the multi-volume Dictionary of the History of Ideas: Studies of Selected Pivotal Ideas (1972), whose 320 articles ranged from "abstraction" to "zeitgeist". In its preface, Wiener argued that while "specialized departments of learning" were necessary, the historian of ideas had a contribution to make by "tracing the cultural roots and historical ramifications of the major and minor specialized concerns of the mind".

He translated a number of works from French including Nicod's Foundations of Geometry and Induction and Duhem's The Aim and Structure of Physical Theory.

== Personal life ==
Wiener was married to Gertrude Schler Wierner.

In his final year Wiener lived in Asheville, North Carolina.

He died on April 5, 1992, at the age of 86 in the Memorial Mission Hospital in Asheville.

== Bibliography ==
=== Books ===
- Evolution and the Founders of Pragmatism, Harvard University Press, 1949.
- Leibniz. Selections., Philip P. Wiener, ed., Charles Scribner's Sons, 1951 (Modern Students Library).
- Studies in the Philosophy of Charles Sanders Peirce, Frederic H. Young, ed., Cambridge, Mass.: Harvard University Press, 1952.
- Readings in Philosophy of Science: Introduction to the Foundations and Cultural Aspects of the Sciences, Philip P. Wiener, ed., New York: Charles Scribner's Sons, 1953.
- Roots of Scientific Thought: A Cultural Perspective, Philip P. Wiener and Aaron Nolan, eds., New York: Basic Books, 1957.
- Values in a Universe of Chance: Selected Writings of Charles S. Peirce, Philip P. Wiener, ed., Garden City, New York, Doubleday, 1958.
- Ideas in Cultural Perspective, Philip P. Wiener and Aaron Noland, eds., New Brunswick, Rutgers University Press, 1962.
- Charles S. Peirce: Selected Writings (Values in a Universe of Chance), Philip P. Wiener, ed., New York: Dover Publications, 1966.
- Renaissance Essays, Philip P. Wiener and Paul O. Kristeller, eds., New York: Harper & Row, 1968 (Harper Torchbooks).
- Basic Problems of Philosophy, Philip P. Wiener, Daniel J. Bronstein and Yervant Hovhannes Krikorian, eds, New York: Prentice-Hall College Division, 1972.
- Wiener, Philip P.; et al., eds. (1973–1974). Dictionary of the History of Ideas: Studies of Selected Pivotal Ideas. Vol. 5. New York: Scribner's.
- Violence and Aggression in the History of Ideas, Philip P. Wiener and John Fisher, eds., New Brunswick, N.J.: Rutgers University Press, c. 1974.

See also: Writings of Professor Philip P. Wiener.

=== Articles and papers ===
- "Notes on Leibniz’s Conception of Logic and Its Historical Context", in: Philosophical Review, Vol. 48 (1939), pp. 567–86.
- "On Methodology in the Philosophy of History", in: Journal of Philosophy, Vol. 38 (1941). pp. 309–24.
- "Method in Russell’s Work on Leibniz", in: The Philosophy of Bertrand Russell, Paul Schilpp, ed., Evanston, Illinois: Northwestern University Press, 1944, pp. 259–76.
- "G. M. Beard and Freud on 'American Nervousness'", in: Journal of the History of Ideas, Vol. 17, No. 2 (Apr., 1956), pp. 269–274
- "Some Problems and Methods in the History of Ideas", in: Journal of the History of Ideas, Vol. 22, No. 4 (Oct. - Dec., 1961), pp. 531–548

See also: List of further articles and papers on Google Scholar.
