= Simone Brangier Boas =

- Born: Simone Marthe Brangier; February 3, 1895; La Crèche, France
- Died: June 17, 1981 (aged 86); Philadelphia, Pennsylvania, U.S.
- Education: California School of Fine Arts, Académie de la Grande Chaumière
- Known for: Sculpture
- Notable work: Ceres (1926), Mother and Child (1932)
- Movement: Modernism
- Spouse: George Boas (m. 1921; died 1980)
- Children: 2
- Awards: Legion of Honour, Medal of French Gratitude

Simone Marthe Brangier Boas (February 3, 1895 – June 17, 1981) was a French-born American modernist sculptor who spent her career in Baltimore, Maryland.

Simone Marthe Brangier was born on February 3, 1895 in La Crèche, France, the daughter of Pierre Armand Brangier and Marie-Louise Geiser. She arrived in the United States in 1904 and became a naturalized US citizen in 1921. She graduated from the University of California Berkeley in 1917 and studied under Leo Lentelli at the California School of Fine Arts. At Berkeley, she met philosophy PhD student George Boas while attending a seminar on The Self; they married in 1921.

During World War I, Brangier went to France to do relief work with refugees, work for which she was later awarded the Medal of French Gratitude. She and George Boas were able to remain in contact in France as he enlisted as a lieutenant in the US Army and served as aide de camp to General Charles Kilburn. After the war, she studied under Antoine Bourdelle at the Académie de la Grande Chaumière.

In 1921, she and George Boas married and they settled in Baltimore, where he joined the faculty of Johns Hopkins University.

Art historian Charlotte Streifer Rubinstein wrote of Boas' work "Imbued with the "truth to materials" aesthetic, Simone Boas carved massive, stylized heads and figures directly in wood and stone with no openings or penetrations in the forms." These included Ceres (1926), a mahogany figure bearing a cornucopia which was purchased by the Cone sisters and was the only American sculpture in the Cone Collection. Boas' award-winning mahogany Mother and Child (1932) was included in the Museum of Modern Art's exhibit "Painting and Sculpture from 16 American Cities" (1933–34) and is now at the Baltimore Museum of Art. Boas also lectured at the Baltimore Museum and taught other female sculptors.

During World War II, she was again involved in relief work, heading the local branch of the Committee for Franco-British Relief and its successor organization, American Aid to France, from 1939-1948. She was awarded the French Legion of Honour for her work.

Boas published some translations from the French, including one of Alfred Charles Auguste Foucher's biography of Buddha.

Simone Marthe Brangier Boas died on 17 June 1981 at a nursing home in Philadelphia at the age of 86.
