= Maryanne Cline Horowitz =

American historian

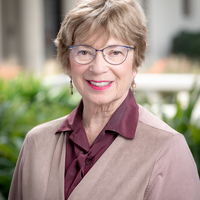
Maryanne Horowitz

Maryanne Cline Horowitz is an American Historian of The Renaissance and of History of ideas. She is Professor of History at Occidental College, Associate of the UCLA CMRS Center for Early Global Studies, and an Affiliate of the USC-Huntington Early Modern Studies Institute. Horowitz is best known as the author of Seeds of Virtue and Knowledge, which won the Jacques Barzun Prize in Cultural History in 1999 from the American Philosophical Society. Dr. Horowitz served as Editor-in-Chief of the New Dictionary of the History of Ideas (6 volumes or E-book) which the American Library Association division RUSA declared an Outstanding Reference Source 2005. She is Co-Editor, Bodies and Maps: Early Modern Personifications of the Continents (Brill Press, 2020). She is an innovator in women's and gender history and was a Research Associate in Women's Studies in Religion at the Harvard Divinity School, 1979-80.

She serves on the Board of Editors of the Journal of the History of ideas, and edited two books in their series Library of the History of Ideas As President of the Renaissance Conference of Southern California, she hosted a national conference for the Renaissance Society of America in 1985 at The Huntington Library, Occidental College, and the J. Paul Getty Museum, commemorated in the co-edited book Renaissance Rereadings: Intertext and Context.

== Education ==
- B.A. with Honors (History) Pembroke College in Brown University.
- M.A.T (Education) Harvard University.
- Ph.D. (History) University of Wisconsin–Madison.

== Selected publications ==
Maryanne Horowitz has published numerous articles and several books, a selection:

- 1997. Seeds of Virtue and Knowledge, Princeton University Press., December 1997 ISBN 0691044635 ACLS e-book.
- 2004. New Dictionary of the History of Ideas. Charles Scribner's Sons, New York, 2004 ISBN 0684313774.
- 2020. Bodies and Maps: Early Modern Personifications of the Continents. Brill Press ISBN 978-90-04-43803-3 e-book and ISBN 978-90-04-38790-4.
