= George Boas =

American professor of philosopher (1891–1980)

- Born: 28 August 1891; Providence, Rhode Island, U.S.
- Died: 17 March 1980 (aged 88); Towson, Maryland, U.S.
- Spouse: Simone Marthe Brangier (m. 1921)
- Children: 2

Education
- Education: Brown University (BA, MA); University of California, Berkeley (PhD)
- Thesis: An Analysis of Certain Theories of Truth (1917)
- Academic advisor: Josiah Royce

Philosophical work
- Era: 20th-century philosophy
- Region: Western philosophy
- Institutions: Johns Hopkins University
- Doctoral students: Norman Kretzmann
- Notable students: Harry Frankfurt
- Main interests: History of philosophy, aesthetics
- Notable ideas: Theriophily

George Boas (/ˈboʊæz/; 28 August 1891 – 17 March 1980) was an American professor of philosophy and professor at Johns Hopkins University.

== Education ==
Boas received his education at Brown University, obtaining both a B.A. and M.A. in philosophy there, after which he studied shortly at Columbia University. He earned his Ph.D. from the University of California, Berkeley, in 1917.

== Career ==
In 1921, Boas was hired at Johns Hopkins by Professor Arthur Oncken Lovejoy as an historian of philosophy. The same year Boas married sculptor Simone Brangier Boas. Boas' tenure at Hopkins was interrupted by the Second World War, in which he served as a Commander in the Naval Reserve. One of his undergraduate students was Alger Hiss, with whom he kept in contact.

Boas was elected to the American Philosophical Society in 1950.

He retired from the school in 1956, continuing his scholarly career with a fellowship at the Center for the Humanities at Wesleyan University and as visiting Andrew W. Mellon chair at the University of Pittsburgh. He was elected to the American Academy of Arts and Sciences in 1957.

His niece was historian of science Marie Boas Hall.

== Major works ==
- The Major Traditions of European Philosophy (1929)
- A Primer for Critics (1937)
- The Hieroglyphics of Horapollo, translation of the original work (1950)
- Dominant Themes in Modern Philosophy (1957)
- The Inquiring Mind (1959)
- Rationalism in Greek Philosophy (1961)
- The Limits of Reason Harper & Brothers (1961)
- The Heaven of Invention (1962)
- The cult of childhood. London, Warburg Institute (1966)
- Vox Populi (1969)
- The History of Ideas: An Introduction (1969)
- Wingless Pegasus A Handbook for Critics (1950)
- What is a Picture, with Harold Wrenn (1964)

== See also ==
- American philosophy
