= Journal of the History of Ideas =

- Discipline: Intellectual history
- Language: English
- Edited by: Joyce Chaplin, Stefanos Geroulanos, Adom Getachew, Ann E. Moyer, Sophie Smith, Don Wyatt

Publication details
- History: 1940–present
- Publisher: University of Pennsylvania Press (United States)
- Frequency: Quarterly

Standard abbreviations
- ISO 4: J. Hist. Ideas

Indexing
- ISSN: 0022-5037 (print); 1086-3222 (web)
- LCCN: 42051802
- JSTOR: 00225037
- OCLC no.: 884607792

Links
- Journal homepage; Online access at Project MUSE

The Journal of the History of Ideas is a quarterly peer-reviewed academic journal covering intellectual history, conceptual history, and the history of ideas, including the histories of philosophy, literature and the arts, natural and social sciences, religion, and political thought.

== History ==
The journal was established in 1940 by Arthur Oncken Lovejoy and Philip P. Wiener and has been published by the University of Pennsylvania Press since 2006. In addition to the print version, current issues are available electronically through Project MUSE, and earlier ones through JSTOR. Since 2015, the Journal is complemented by a blog, which publishes short articles and interviews related to intellectual history.

== Editorial team ==
The editors-in-chief are Joyce Chaplin (Harvard University), Stefanos Geroulanos (New York University), Adom Getachew (University of Chicago), Ann E. Moyer (University of Pennsylvania), Sophie Smith (University of Oxford), and Don Wyatt (Middlebury College). Distinguished former editors include Arthur Lovejoy, John Herman Randall, Paul Oskar Kristeller, Philip P. Wiener, Donald Kelley, Lewis White Beck and Anthony Grafton.

== Abstracting and indexing ==
The journal is abstracted and indexed in:

- America: History and Life
- Annual Bibliography of English Language and Literature
- Arts and Humanities Citation Index
- Bibliography of the History of Art
- CSA Worldwide Political Science Abstracts
- Current Contents/Arts & Humanities
- Historical Abstracts
- International Bibliography of the Social Sciences
- L'Année Philologique
- MLA International Bibliography
- Philosopher's Index
- RILM Abstracts of Music Literature
