= Architectonics =

Philosophical concept

In philosophy, architectonics is used figuratively (after architecture) to mean "foundational" or "fundamental", supporting the structure of a morality, society, or culture. In Kant's architectonic system there is a progression of phases from the most formal to the most empirical C. S. Peirce adapted the Kantian concept as his blueprint for a pragmatic philosophy. Martial Gueroult wrote of "architectonic unities". Michel Foucault adapted the concept in his treatise The Archaeology of Knowledge.

== See also ==
- Aristotelianism, a philosophical tradition inspired by the work of Aristotle
- The Archaeology of Knowledge (L’archéologie du savoir), a 1969 treatise by Michel Foucault
